= 2013–14 C.F. União season =

C.F. União
2013-14 season
- President: Filipe Silva
- Manager: Predrag Jokanović
- 2013–14 Segunda Liga: 13th place
- 2013–14 Taça da Liga: Group stage
- 2013–14 Taça de Portugal: 2nd round

União da Madeira competed in the 2013–14 Segunda Liga, the 2013–14 Taça da Liga, and the 2013-14 Taça de Portugal.

== Roster ==
As of 19 July 2012

Note: Flags indicate national team as defined under FIFA eligibility rules; some limited exceptions apply. Players may hold more than one non-FIFA nationality.

No.	Pos.	Nation	Player
1	GK	POR	Christopher
3	DF	ARG	Fernando Ávalos
4	DF	POR	Calico
5	DF	POR	Ginho
6	MF	POR	Toni
8	DF	POR	Carlos Manuel
9	FW	POR	Miguel Fidalgo
10	MF	POR	Hugo Morais
11	MF	POR	Steve
13	DF	CPV	Delmiro
15	MF	CPV	Jimmy

No.	Pos.	Nation	Player
17	MF	POR	Tiago Costa
18	MF	POR	Babo
19	FW	POR	Ricardo Chíxaro
20	DF	POR	Roberto
22	DF	POR	Gil Barros
23	FW	STP	Silva
30	DF	ALG	Kheireddine Zarabi
36	GK	POR	José Manuel
88	GK	POR	Pedro Trigueira
—	FW	POR	Bocar Djumo

== Match results ==
=== Segunda Liga ===
11 August 2013 Match 1	Desportivo das Aves	0–2	União da Madeira	Vila das Aves
18:00		Summary	Zarabi 60'; Toni (yellow card) 60'; Pedro Trigueira (yellow card) 88'; Hugo Morais (yellow card) 89'; Miguel Fidalgo 90+1'	Stadium: Estádio do CD das Aves; Attendance: 425; Referee: (Portugal) Jorge Ferreira

17 August 2013 Match 2	União da Madeira	1–0	Santa Clara	Funchal
20:00	Hugo Morais (yellow card) 26'; Carlos Manuel (yellow card) 54'; Miguel Fidalgo 77'; Toni (yellow card) 82'; Tiago Costa (yellow card) 88'; Djuma Bocur (yellow card) 90+3'	Summary	Sandro (yellow card) 41'; Pedro Pacheco (yellow card) 57'; Elyes Seddiki (yellow card) 75'	Stadium: Campo do Adelino Rodrigues; Attendance: 159; Referee: (Portugal) Jorge Joaquim Martins de Barros Tavares

21 August 2013 Match 3	Sporting Braga B	2–0	União da Madeira	Braga
17:30	Diogo Sousa Ribeiro 13'; Piqueti Djassi Brito Silva (yellow card) 34'; Tomás Dabó (yellow card) 66'; João Patrão 70'; Núrio Fortuna (yellow card) 73'	Summary	Tiago Costa (yellow card) 75'; Miguel Fidalgo (yellow card) 87'	Stadium: Estádio Primeiro de Maio; Attendance: 534; Referee: (Portugal) José Pedro Morgado Laranjeira

25 August 2013 Match 4	União da Madeira	1–1	Moreirense	Funchal
17:00	Ávalos (yellow card) 32'; Toni (yellow card) 42'; Ginho (yellow card) 47'; Adilson (yellow card) 61'; Ze Vitor 90+2'	Summary	Pires 78' (pen.); Rui Miguel (yellow card) 90+2'	Stadium: Campo do Adelino Rodrigues; Attendance: 502; Referee: (Portugal) Duarte Gomes

1 September 2013 Match 5	Tondela	2–1	União da Madeira	Tondela
17:00	Carlos André (yellow card) 12'; Fausto Lourenco (red card) 24'; Evandro Brandão (yellow card) 24'; Pica 68'; Piojo 83'	Summary	Adilson (yellow card) 5'; Ze Vitor 45+2'; Delmiro (yellow card) 49'; Ginho (yellow card) 76' (yellow-red card)	Stadium: Estádio João Cardoso; Attendance: 578; Referee: (Portugal) Carlos Miguel Taborda Xistra

14 September 2013 Match 6	União da Madeira	0–1	C.S. Marítimo B	Funchal
17:00	Zé Vítor (yellow card) 38'; Miguel Fidalgo (yellow card) 43'; Zarabi (yellow card) 52'; Ávalos (yellow card) 87'; Roberto (yellow card) 90+1'	Summary	Kukula (yellow card) 8'; Ricardo Miguel Martins Alves (red card) 50'; Edivândio 52' (pen.); Armando Freitas (yellow card) 80'; José Tiago (yellow card) 88'	Stadium: Campo do Adelino Rodrigues; Attendance: 546; Referee: (Portugal) Manuel Mota

18 September 2013 Match 7	Sporting Covilhã	1–1	União da Madeira	Covilhã
17:00	Forbes 13'; Mutaro Embalo (yellow card) 40' (yellow-red card); Tiago Martins (yellow card) 65'	Summary	Ávalos (yellow card) 27'; Zé Vítor (yellow card) 53'; Roberto (red card) 55'; Toni (yellow card) 83'; Hugo Morais 84' (pen.)	Stadium: Estádio Municipal José Santos Pinto; Attendance: 303; Referee: (Portugal) Manuel Oliveira

28 September 2013 Match 8	União da Madeira	1–0	Académico de Viseu	Funchal
17:00	Carlos Manuel (yellow card) 25'; Delmiro (yellow card) 39'; Hugo Morais (yellow card) 44'; Lourenço 45+1' (o.g.); Zarabi (yellow card) 48'; Toni (yellow card) 67'	Summary	Bassalia Ouattara (yellow card) 32'; João Paulo Neto Martins (yellow card) 87'	Stadium: Campo do Adelino Rodrigues; Attendance: 246; Referee: (Portugal) Jorge Ferreira

6 October 2013 Match 9	Feirense	1–0	União da Madeira	Santa Maria da Feira Municipality
17:00	Chapinha (yellow card) 27'; Tonel 35'	Summary	Toni (yellow card) 40'; Zarabi (yellow card) 73' (yellow-red card)	Stadium: Estádio Marcolino de Castro; Attendance: 684; Referee: (Portugal) Rui Rodrigues

13 October 2013 Match 10	União da Madeira	2–0	Chaves	Funchal
17:00	Miguel Fidalgo 13' (pen.) 43'; Ginho (yellow card) 81'	Summary	Ricardo Rocha (red card) 11'; Pierre Sagna (yellow card) 64'; João Fernandes (yellow card) 64'	Stadium: Campo do Adelino Rodrigues; Attendance: 313; Referee: (Portugal) Bruno Alexandre Da Silva Esteves

23 October 2013 Match 11	União da Madeira	0–0	Farense	Funchal
16:00	Ávalos (yellow card) 10'; Carlos Manuel (yellow card) 36'; Rúben Andrade (yellow card) 80'; Delmiro (yellow card) 88'; Ludgério Silva (yellow card) 88'	Summary	Hernani (yellow card) 44'	Stadium: Campo do Adelino Rodrigues; Attendance: 213; Referee: (Portugal) Cosme Cunha Machado

27 October 2013 Match 12	Oliveirense	3–2	União da Madeira	Oliveira de Azeméis (parish)
16:00	Alphonse Kodjo Kassé (yellow card) 39'; Rui Lima 54' (pen.) 66', 77'; Hélder Silva (yellow card) 58'; Mamadou Ba (yellow card) 78'; Sérgio Domingos Reis Silva (yellow card) 79'	Summary	Babo (yellow card) 19' (yellow-red card); Rúben Andrade 29' (pen.); Zarabi (yellow card) 53'; Ludgério Silva 64' (yellow card) 69'; Calico (yellow card) 86'	Stadium: Estádio Carlos Osório; Attendance: 552; Referee: (Portugal) Jorge Joaquim Martins de Barros Tavares

3 November 2013 Match 13	União da Madeira	2–3	Sporting Clube de Portugal B	Funchal
16:00	Delmiro 9'; Miguel Fidalgo 62'; Rúben Andrade (yellow card) 69'	Summary	Ricardo Esgaio 46' 70' (pen.); Rúben Semedo (yellow card) 71'; Fokobo (yellow card) 77'; Cristian Ponde 87'; Hugo Sousa (yellow card) 89'	Stadium: Campo do Adelino Rodrigues; Attendance: 1,014; Referee: (Portugal) Vasco Santos

6 November 2013 Match 14	Benfica B	4–4	União da Madeira	Seixal
16:00	Markovic 13'; Victor Lindelöf 15'; André Gomes 18'; João Cancelo 38'	Summary	Zarabi 6'; Miguel Fidalgo 32', 58'; Adilson 40'	Stadium: Caixa Futebol Campus

10 November 2013 Match 15	União da Madeira	1–0	Porto B	Funchal
16:00	Arthuro (yellow card) 67'; Bocar Djumo 81'; Rúben Andrade (yellow card) 83'	Summary	Mikel Agu (yellow card) 26'	Stadium: Campo do Adelino Rodrigues; Attendance: 959; Referee: (Portugal) João Carlos Santos Capela

17 November 2013 Match 16	União da Madeira	4–0	Clube Desportivo Trofense	Funchal
17:00	Ludgério Silva 19'; Fernando Horácio Ávalos 23'; Arthuro 31'; Rúben Andrade 54' (pen.)	Summary	Hélder Sousa (yellow card) 30'; Matheus (yellow card) 46'; Dennis Nieblas (yellow card) 53'	Stadium: Campo do Adelino Rodrigues; Attendance: 692; Referee: (Portugal) Nuno Miguel Serrano Almeida

23 November 2013 Match 17	Atlético CP	2–1	União da Madeira	Alcântara
16:00	Hugo Pina 18'; Bacar Baldé (yellow card) 33'; João Mário (yellow card) 37'; Varela 73' (yellow card) 87'	Summary	Arthuro 48'; Ginho (yellow card) 83'	Stadium: Estádio Tapadinha; Attendance: 312; Referee: (Portugal) José Pedro Morgado Laranjeira

1 December 2013 Match 18	Portimonense	2–1	União da Madeira	Portimão
16:00	Fabrício 9' (yellow card) 83'; Rui Correia 70'; Kanazaki (yellow card) 90+2'; Márcio Ramos (yellow card) 90+3'	Summary	Gil Barros (yellow card) 6'; Arthuro 41' (yellow card) 69'; Tiago Costa (yellow card) 79'; Adilson (yellow card) 90+2'	Stadium: Estádio Municipal de Portimão; Attendance: 776; Referee: (Portugal) Hugo Filipe Ferreira de Campos Moreira Miguel

8 December 2013 Match 19	União da Madeira	2–0	Beira-Mar	Funchal
16:00	Ávalos 42'; Ludgério Silva 51'; Gil Barros (yellow card) 83'	Summary	Dieguinho (yellow card) 59'; Ricardo Dias (yellow card) 62'; Daniel Santos Martins (yellow card) 69'	Stadium: Campo do Adelino Rodrigues; Attendance: 570; Referee: (Portugal) Ricardo Moreira

11 December 2013 Match 20	Penafiel	1–1	União da Madeira	Penafiel, Portugal
16:00	João Pedro 40' (yellow card) 84'; Fábio Ervões (yellow card) 73'; Pedro Ribeiro (red card) 88'	Summary	Ludgério Silva (yellow card) 26'; Carlos Manuel (yellow card) 65'; Ginho (yellow card) 69'; Miguel Fidalgo 74' (pen.); Hugo Morais (yellow card) 90+2'	Stadium: Estádio Municipal 25 de Abril; Attendance: 401; Referee: (Portugal) Jorge Faustino

15 December 2013 Match 21	União da Madeira	4–1	Leixões	Funchal
16:00	Arthuro 21' 30' (pen.) 49' (yellow card) 78'; Delmiro (yellow card) 37'; Rúben Andrade (yellow card) 67' (goal) 86'; Babo (yellow card) 73'	Summary	João Pedro (yellow card) 29'; Materazzi (yellow card) 47'; Moreira 60'	Stadium: Campo do Adelino Rodrigues; Attendance: 613; Referee: (Portugal) Pedro Proença

21 December 2013 Match 22	União da Madeira	1–0	Desportivo das Aves	Funchal
16:00	Hugo Morais 49'; Delmiro (red card) 90'	Summary	Jorge Ribeiro (yellow card) 72'	Stadium: Campo do Adelino Rodrigues; Attendance: 506; Referee: (Portugal) Jorge de Sousa

29 December 2013 Match 23	Santa Clara	1–0	União da Madeira	Ponta Delgada (Azores)
16:00	Minhoca 27' (pen.); Hugo Santos (yellow card) 31' (yellow-red card)	Summary	Zarabi (yellow card) 19'; Ginho (yellow card) 26'; Arthuro (yellow card) 57' (yellow-red card)	Stadium: Estádio de São Miguel; Attendance: 327; Referee: (Portugal) Bruno Miguel Duarte Paixão

12 January 2014 Match 24	União da Madeira	1–2	Sporting Braga B	Funchal
16:00	Babo (yellow card) 26'; Delmiro (yellow card) 27'; Hugo Morais 66' (pen.); Rúben Andrade (yellow card) 74'; Zarabi (yellow card) 90'	Summary	Djibril Zidnaba 49'; Gonçalo Silva (yellow card) 53'; Nuno Valente (yellow card) 65'; Diogo Sousa Ribeiro 67'	Stadium: Campo do Adelino Rodrigues; Attendance: 309; Referee: (Portugal) Carlos Manuel Moedas Narciso Espadinha

18 January 2014 Match 25	Moreirense	3–0	União da Madeira	Moreira de Cónegos
17:00	Elízio (yellow card) 29'; Pires 34' (pen.); Wagner 38'; Rui Miguel 59'	Summary	Ávalos (yellow card) 44'; Adilson (yellow card) 57'	Stadium: Parque de Jogos Comendador Joaquim de Almeida Freitas; Attendance: 1,128; Referee: (Portugal) Rui Manuel Gomes Costa

22 January 2014 Match 26	União da Madeira	0–1	Tondela	Funchal
16:00	Rúben Andrade (yellow card) 39'	Summary	Zarabi 30' (o.g.); Dally Cyrille (yellow card) 81'	Stadium: Campo do Adelino Rodrigues; Attendance: 220; Referee: (Portugal) Manuel Mota

29 January 2014 Match 27	C.S. Marítimo B	0–2	União da Madeira	Funchal
17:00	Fábio Santos (yellow card) 22'	Summary	Zarabi 24'; Ginho (yellow card) 41'; Adilson (yellow card) 54'; Rúben Andrade 86'	Stadium: Campo da Imaculada Conceição; Attendance: 604; Referee: (Portugal) Carlos Miguel Taborda Xistra

2 February 2014 Match 28	União da Madeira	4–1	Sporting Covilhã	Funchal
16:00	Janício 18' (o.g.); Ginho (yellow card) 20'; Arthuro 40', 63' (yellow card) 53'; Silva 78'	Summary	Massaia (yellow card) 16'; Rocha 21'; Forbes (yellow card) 60'	Stadium: Campo do Adelino Rodrigues; Attendance: 456; Referee: (Portugal) José Pedro Morgado Laranjeira

9 February 2014 Match 29	Académico de Viseu	1–0	União da Madeira	Viseu
16:00	João Paulo Neto Martins 38'	Summary	Roberto (yellow card) 53'	Stadium: Estádio do Fontelo; Attendance: 614; Referee: (Portugal) Nuno Miguel Serrano Almeida

16 February 2014 Match 30	Chaves	3–0	União da Madeira	Chaves Municipality, Portugal
16:00	Barry 15', 69' (yellow card) 39'; Luís Pinto 49'	Summary	Zarabi (yellow card) 25'; Adilson (yellow card) 41'; Gil Barros (yellow card) 90+1'	Stadium: Estádio Municipal de Chaves; Attendance: 800; Referee: (Portugal) Hugo Rodrigues Pacheco

23 February 2014 Match 31	União da Madeira	0–2	Feirense	Funchal
16:00	Zarabi (yellow card) 31' (yellow-red card); Babo (yellow card) 37'; Carlos Manuel (yellow card) 70'	Summary	Icaro 26'; Jorge Gonçalves 31' (pen.); Cris (yellow card) 36'	Stadium: Campo do Adelino Rodrigues; Attendance: 311; Referee: (Portugal) Cosme Cunha Machado

2 March 2014 Match 32	Farense	1–1	União da Madeira	Faro, Portugal
16:00	Abraham Adelaja 9'; Zugić (yellow card) 27'; Fábio Felício (yellow card) 48'; Joshua Silva (yellow card) 67'	Summary	Arthuro 50' (yellow card) 50'	Stadium: Estádio de São Luís; Attendance: 779; Referee: (Portugal) Duarte Gomes

9 March 2014 Match 33	União da Madeira	2–0	Oliveirense	Funchal
16:00	Choco (yellow card) 17'; Ludgério Silva 64'; Miguel Fidalgo 77'	Summary	Godinho (yellow card) 42'; Renan (yellow card) 44'; Califo (yellow card) 77'; Capela (yellow card) 83'	Stadium: Campo do Adelino Rodrigues; Attendance: 709; Referee: (Portugal) Jorge Ferreira

16 March 2014 Match 34	Sporting Clube de Portugal B	0–0	União da Madeira	Alcochete
16:00	Shikabala (yellow card) 63'	Summary	Roberto (yellow card) 40'; Toni (yellow card) 70'; Rúben Andrade (yellow card) 70'; Pedro Trigueira (yellow card) 90+3'	Stadium: CGD STADIUM AURÉLIO PEREIRA; Attendance: 331; Referee: (Portugal) Pedro Ferreira

23 March 2014 Match 35	União da Madeira	2–1	Benfica B	Funchal
16:30	Ludgério Silva (yellow card) 11'; Arthuro 21', 31'; Davit Azin (yellow card) 26'; Babo (yellow card) 80'	Summary	Rogelio Funes Mori 9' (yellow card) 78'; Bruno Gaspar (yellow card) 53'	Stadium: Campo do Adelino Rodrigues; Attendance: 1,115; Referee: (Portugal) Nuno Miguel Serrano Almeida

30 March 2014 Match 36	F.C. Porto B	2–1	União da Madeira	Porto
16:00	Tó Zé 48' (pen.) 62'; Zé António (yellow card) 70'; Podstawski (yellow card) 83'; Ivo Tiago Santos Rodrigues (yellow card) 90'	Summary	Calico (yellow card) 47'; Miguel Fidalgo 57'; Robert (yellow card) 59'; David Azin (yellow card) 90+1'	Stadium: Estádio Dr. Jorge Sampaio; Attendance: 279; Referee: (Portugal) Rui Rodrigues

6 April 2014 Match 37	União da Madeira	0–0	Atlético CP	Funchal
17:00	Gil Barros (yellow card) 77'; Calico (yellow card) 88'	Summary	Moreira (yellow card) 35'; Bacar Baldé (yellow card) 48'; Hugo Carreira (red card) 90+1'; Mika (yellow card) 90+3'	Stadium: Campo do Adelino Rodrigues; Attendance: 770; Referee: (Portugal) Rui Manuel Gomes Costa

13 April 2014 Match 38	Trofense	1–0	União da Madeira	Trofa, Portugal
17:00	Luiz Alberto (yellow card) 33'; Hélder Sousa (yellow card) 44'; Preciado 47'; Marcelo (red card) 64'; Tiago Pereira (yellow card) 76'	Summary	Zarabi (yellow card) 5'; Calico (yellow card) 8'; David Azin (yellow card) 67'; Gil Barros (yellow card) 86'	Stadium: Estádio do Clube Desportivo Trofense; Attendance: 843; Referee: (Portugal) João Carlos Santos Capela

19 April 2014 Match 39	União da Madeira	3–0	Portimonense S.C.	Funchal
17:00	Hugo Morais 49' (pen.); Adílson 86', 89'; Choco (yellow card) 87'	Summary	Ivo Nicolau (yellow card) 25'; Pessoa (yellow card) 44'; Lucas Possignolo (yellow card) 47'	Stadium: Campo do Adelino Rodrigues; Attendance: 919; Referee: (Portugal) Luís Guimarães

27 April 2014 Match 40	Beira-Mar	0–0	União da Madeira	Aveiro, Portugal
17:00	Daffara (yellow card) 67'; Luís Gustavo (yellow card) 76'	Summary	Ginho (yellow card) 46'; Hugo Morais (yellow card) 68'	Stadium: Estádio Municipal de Aveiro; Attendance: 584; Referee: (Portugal) Jorge Faustino

4 May 2014 Match 41	União da Madeira	1–2	Penafiel	Funchal
17:00	Arthuro 5'; Zarabi (yellow card) 29'; Pedro Trigueira (yellow card) 31'; Toni (yellow card) 50'	Summary	Hélder Guedes 18', 32'; Pedro Santos (yellow card) 67'; José Coelho (yellow card) 90+1'	Stadium: Campo do Adelino Rodrigues; Attendance: 1,629; Referee: (Portugal) Carlos Miguel Taborda Xistra

11 May 2014 Match 42	Leixões	1–1	União da Madeira	Matosinhos
17:00	Mailó (yellow card) 42'; João Novais 49' (pen.); Cadinha (yellow card) 55'; João Viana (yellow card) 62'; Materazzi (yellow card) 67'	Summary	Rúben Andrade 8'; Calico (yellow card) 31'; Ginho (yellow card) 48'; Hugo Morais (yellow card) 90'	Stadium: Estádio do Mar; Attendance: 1,050; Referee: (Portugal) Cosme Cunha Machado

=== Taça da Liga ===
Group A

Team	Pld	W	D	L	GF	GA	GD	Pts
Portimonense	3	2	1	0	3	0	+3	7
Beira-Mar	3	1	1	1	4	3	+1	4
Trofense	3	1	0	2	2	4	−1	3
União da Madeira	3	0	2	1	2	4	−2	2

27 July 2013 Match 1	Trofense	2–0	União da Madeira	Trofa, Portugal
18:00	Hélder Sousa (yellow card) 40'; Luiz Alberto 67'; Fernando Neves (yellow card) 71'; Matheus (yellow card) 84'; João Jesus 85'	Summary	Ludgério Silva (yellow card) 58'; Toni (yellow card) 60'; Steve (yellow card) 90+1'	Stadium: Estádio do Clube Desportivo Trofense; Attendance: 738; Referee: (Portugal) Ricardo Moreira

31 July 2013 Match 2	União da Madeira	0–0	Portimonense	Machico
19:00	Steve (yellow card) 24'; Carlos Manuel (yellow card) 81'; Miguel Fidalgo (yellow card) 82'	Summary	Zambujo (yellow card) 30'; Rui Correia (yellow card) 74'	Stadium: Estádio Municipal de Machico; Attendance: 109; Referee: (Portugal) Jorge Faustino

4 August 2013 Match 3	Beira-Mar	2–2	União da Madeira	Aveiro, Portugal
18:00	Nildo Petrolina 13', 65'; André Nogueira (yellow card) 22'; Hélder Tavares (yellow card) 38'	Summary	Miguel Fidalgo 23', 34'; Jimmy (yellow card) 40'; Toni (yellow card) 56'; Delmiro (yellow card) 81'	Stadium: Estádio Municipal de Aveiro; Attendance: 725; Referee: (Portugal) Rui Rodrigues

=== Taça de Portugal ===
22 September 2013 Round 2	Benfica Castelo Branco	2–1	União da Madeira	Castelo Branco
16:00		Summary		Stadium: Estádio Municipal Vale do Romeiro
