= List of Portuguese football transfers summer 2009 =

This is a list of Portuguese football transfers for the summer of 2009. The summer transfer window opened on 1 July and closed at midnight on 31 August. Players may have been bought before the transfer windows opens, but may only joined their new club on 1 July. Only moves involving Primeira Liga clubs are listed. Additionally, players without a club may join a club at any time.

== Transfers ==
Date	Name	Moving from	Moving to	Fee
3 March 2009	(Portugal) Silvestre Varela	(Portugal) Estrela da Amadora	(Portugal) Porto	Free
14 April 2009	(Venezuela) Mario Rondón	(Portugal) Pontassolense	(Portugal) Nacional	Free
18 April 2009	(Brazil) Patric	(Brazil) São Caetano	(Portugal) Benfica	Undisclosed
23 April 2009	(Portugal) Orlando Sá	(Portugal) Braga	(Portugal) Porto	Undisclosed
8 May 2009	(United States) Kamani Hill	(Germany) VfL Wolfsburg	(Portugal) Vitória de Guimarães	Free
16 May 2009	(Portugal) Manuel José	(Romania) Cluj	(Portugal) Paços de Ferreira	Free
17 May 2009	(Portugal) Jorge Gonçalves	(Spain) Racing de Santander	(Portugal) Vitória de Guimarães	Loan
22 May 2009	(Brazil) Ramires	(Brazil) Cruzeiro	(Portugal) Benfica	€7,500,000
26 May 2009	(Uruguay) Luis Aguiar	(Portugal) Braga	(Russia) Dynamo Moscow	Undisclosed
26 May 2009	(Mauritius) Jonathan Bru	(Cyprus) AEP Paphos	(Portugal) Académica de Coimbra	Free
29 May 2009	(Brazil) Peterson Peçanha	(Greece) Thrasyvoulos	(Portugal) Marítimo	Free
30 May 2009	(Brazil) Maicon	(Portugal) Nacional	(Portugal) Porto	€2,000,000
31 May 2009	(Paraguay) David Mendieta	(Paraguay) 12 de Octubre	(Portugal) Vitória de Guimarães	Undisclosed
1 June 2009	(Slovakia) Boris Peškovič	(Portugal) Académica de Coimbra	(Romania) Cluj	Free
4 June 2009	(Uruguay) Álvaro Pereira	(Romania) Cluj	(Portugal) Porto	€4,500,000
6 June 2009	(Portugal) Anselmo	(Portugal) Estrela da Amadora	(Portugal) Nacional	Free
9 June 2009	(Argentina) José Shaffer	(Argentina) Racing	(Portugal) Benfica	€1,900,000
11 June 2009	(Portugal) Nuno Piloto	(Portugal) Académica de Coimbra	(Greece) Iraklis	Free
11 June 2009	(Portugal) Paulo Jorge	(Portugal) Braga	(Cyprus) APOEL	Undisclosed
15 June 2009	(Brazil) Gustavo Lazzaretti	(Brazil) Atlético Paranaense	(Portugal) Vitória de Guimarães	Loan
16 June 2009	(Cape Verde) Janício	(Portugal) Vitória de Setúbal	(Cyprus) Anorthosis	Free
17 June 2009	(Portugal) Jorge Gonçalves	(Spain) Racing de Santander	(Portugal) Vitória de Guimarães	Loan
17 June 2009	(Portugal) Beto	(Portugal) Leixões	(Portugal) Porto	Undisclosed
18 June 2009	(Venezuela) Angelo Peña	(Venezuela) Estudiantes de Mérida	(Portugal) Braga	Undisclosed
19 June 2009	(Brazil) Nenê	(Portugal) Nacional	(Italy) Cagliari	€4,500,000
21 June 2009	(Portugal) Filipe Mendes	(Portugal) Estrela da Amadora	(Portugal) Paços de Ferreira	Free
23 June 2009	(Greece) Kostas Katsouranis	(Portugal) Benfica	(Greece) Panathinaikos	€2,500,000
23 June 2009	(France) Grégory	(Portugal) Vitória de Guimarães	(Spain) Sporting Gijón	Free
23 June 2009	(Portugal) João Tomás	(Portugal) Boavista	(Portugal) Rio Ave	Free
23 June 2009	(Portugal) Fernando Alexandre	(Portugal) Estrela da Amadora	(Portugal) Braga	Free
25 June 2009	(Portugal) Alex	(Germany) VfL Wolfsburg	(Portugal) Vitória de Guimarães	Free
25 June 2009	(Brazil) Ney Santos	(Portugal) Estrela da Amadora	(Portugal) Braga	Free
26 June 2009	(Portugal) Chico Silva	(Portugal) Paços de Ferreira	(Portugal) Oliveirense	Free
26 June 2009	(Colombia) Brayan Angulo	(Portugal) Leixões	(Spain) Deportivo La Coruña	€100,000
29 June 2009	(Argentina) Javier Saviola	(Spain) Real Madrid	(Portugal) Benfica	€5,000,000
29 June 2009	(Portugal) Miguel Lopes	(Portugal) Rio Ave	(Portugal) Porto	€600,000
30 June 2009	(Argentina) Lucho González	(Portugal) Porto	(France) Marseille	€18,000,000
1 July 2009	(Slovenia) Nejc Pečnik	(Slovenia) Celje	(Portugal) Nacional	Undisclosed
1 July 2009	(Portugal) Diogo Valente	(Portugal) Porto	(Portugal) Braga	Free
1 July 2009	(Chile) Matías Fernández	(Spain) Villarreal	(Portugal) Sporting CP	€3,635,000
2 July 2009	(Brazil) Rodrigo Possebon	(England) Manchester United	(Portugal) Braga	Loan
2 July 2009	(Morocco) Tarik Sektioui	(Portugal) Porto	(United Arab Emirates) Ajman Club	Free
3 July 2009	(Portugal) Paulo Machado	(Portugal) Porto	(France) Toulouse	€3,500,000
3 July 2009	(Portugal) Emídio Rafael	(Portugal) Portimonense	(Portugal) Académica de Coimbra	Free
3 July 2009	(Portugal) Bruno Amaro	(Portugal) Nacional	(Portugal) Académica de Coimbra	Loan
4 July 2009	(Cameroon) Jean Paul Yontcha	(Romania) Otopeni	(Portugal) Belenenses	Free
4 July 2009	(Nigeria) Kevin Amuneke	(Romania) Politehnica Timișoara	(Portugal) Porto	Free
4 July 2009	(Angola) Stélvio	(Portugal) Braga	(Portugal) União de Leiria	Loan
4 July 2009	(Brazil) Diego Gaúcho	(Portugal) Gil Vicente	(Portugal) União de Leiria	Free
6 July 2009	(Portugal) Kiko	(Portugal) Paços de Ferreira	(Portugal) Gil Vicente	Loan
6 July 2009	(Argentina) Fernando Belluschi	(Greece) Olympiacos	(Portugal) Porto	€5,000,000
7 July 2009	(Brazil) Luiz Carlos	(Portugal) União de Leiria	South China	Loan
7 July 2009	(Senegal) Ladji Keita	(Cyprus) AEP Paphos	(Portugal) Vitória de Setúbal	Free
7 July 2009	(Argentina) Lisandro López	(Portugal) Porto	(France) Lyon	€24,000,000
8 July 2009	(Portugal) Diogo Viana	(Portugal) Porto	(Netherlands) VVV-Venlo	Loan
8 July 2009	(Argentina) Cristian Trombetta	(Argentina) Nueva Chicago	(Portugal) Leixões	Free
8 July 2009	(Brazil) Cauê	(Brazil) Santo André	(Portugal) Leixões	Free
8 July 2009	(Portugal) João Pedro	(Portugal) União de Leiria	(Portugal) Oliveirense	Free
10 July 2009	(Portugal) Filipe da Costa	(Bulgaria) Levski Sofia	(Portugal) Nacional	Free
10 July 2009	(Portugal) Bruno Gama	(Portugal) Porto	(Portugal) Rio Ave	Free
10 July 2009	(Brazil) Saulo	(Portugal) Belenenses	(Spain) Celta Vigo	Free
11 July 2009	(Serbia) Vukašin Dević	(Serbia) Red Star Belgrade	(Portugal) Belenenses	Free
11 July 2009	(Portugal) Vieirinha	(Portugal) Porto	(Greece) PAOK	€1,000,000
12 July 2009	(Brazil) Alan	(Brazil) Comercial	(Portugal) Vitória de Setúbal	Free
12 July 2009	(Portugal) Romeu Ribeiro	(Portugal) Benfica	(Portugal) Trofense	Loan
13 July 2009	(Argentina) Fernando Ávalos	(Portugal) Belenenses	(Cyprus) Nea Salamis	Free
13 July 2009	(Portugal) João Fajardo	(Portugal) Vitória de Guimarães	(Greece) Panthrakikos	Free
14 July 2009	(Portugal) Vítor Vinha	(Portugal) Académica de Coimbra	(Cyprus) Nea Salamis	Loan
14 July 2009	(Portugal) Daniel Candeias	(Portugal) Porto	(Spain) Recreativo Huelva	Loan
14 July 2009	(Brazil) Ibson	(Portugal) Porto	(Russia) Spartak Moscow	Undisclosed
14 July 2009	(Portugal) Tininho	(Portugal) Belenenses	(Romania) Steaua București	Free
14 July 2009	(Brazil) Saulo	(Portugal) Belenenses	(Spain) Celta Vigo	Free
14 July 2013	(Portugal) Pedro Celestino	(Portugal) Sporting CP	(Portugal) Belenenses	Free
15 July 2009	(Colombia) Radamel Falcao	(Argentina) River Plate	(Portugal) Porto	€3,930,000
15 July 2009	(Argentina) Diego Valeri	(Argentina) Lanús	(Portugal) Porto	Undisclosed
17 July 2009	(Portugal) Hélder Barbosa	(Portugal) Porto	(Portugal) Vitória de Setúbal	Loan
17 July 2009	(Portugal) Carlos Carneiro	(Portugal) Paços de Ferreira	(Portugal) Vizela	Free
18 July 2009	(Brazil) Wanderley	(Brazil) Cruzeiro	(Portugal) Marítimo	€750,000
18 July 2009	(Brazil) Aldo	(Brazil) Cruzeiro	(Portugal) Marítimo	Loan
18 July 2009	(Portugal) Ruca	(Portugal) Porto	(Portugal) Marítimo	Free
18 July 2009	(Brazil) Bruno Grassi	(Portugal) Marítimo	(Portugal) Tourizense	Loan
18 July 2009	(Portugal) Ruben Lima	(Portugal) Benfica	(Portugal) Vitória de Setúbal	Loan
18 July 2009	(Brazil) Leandro Lima	(Portugal) Porto	(Brazil) Cruzeiro	Loan
18 July 2009	(France) Aly Cissokho	(Portugal) Porto	(France) Lyon	€15,000,000
19 July 2009	(Portugal) Gonçalo	(Portugal) Nacional	(Portugal) Santa Clara	Loan
19 July 2009	(Argentina) Roberto Tucker	(Argentina) Quilmes	(Portugal) Leixões	Free
24 July 2009	(Brazil) Alberto	(Brazil) Rio Branco	(Portugal) União de Leiria	Free
24 July 2009	(Brazil) Hammes	(Brazil) Rio Branco	(Portugal) União de Leiria	Free
20 July 2009	(Brazil) Maykon	(Portugal) Belenenses	(Portugal) Paços de Ferreira	Free
20 July 2009	(Portugal) Pelé	(Portugal) Porto	(Spain) Real Valladolid	Loan
20 July 2009	(Portugal) Barroca	(Portugal) Tourizense	(Portugal) Académica de Coimbra	Free
21 July 2009	(Spain) Javi García	(Spain) Real Madrid	(Portugal) Benfica	€7,000,000
21 July 2009	(Argentina) Sebastián Prediger	(Argentina) Colón	(Portugal) Porto	€2,000,000
21 July 2009	(Brazil) Weldon	(Brazil) Sport	(Portugal) Benfica	€276,000
22 July 2009	(Poland) Przemysław Kaźmierczak	(Portugal) Porto	(Portugal) Vitória de Setúbal	Free
23 July 2009	(Portugal) Miguel Rosa	(Portugal) Benfica	(Portugal) Carregado	Loan
23 July 2009	(Portugal) Ivan Santos	(Portugal) Benfica	(Portugal) Carregado	Loan
23 July 2009	(Senegal) Abdou Guirassy	(Portugal) Ribeirão	(Portugal) Nacional	Free
23 July 2009	(Ecuador) Felipe Caicedo	(England) Manchester City	(Portugal) Sporting CP	Loan
24 July 2009	(Portugal) Vítor Castanheira	(Portugal) Braga	(Portugal) Chaves	Free
24 July 2009	(Portugal) Barge	(Portugal) Estoril	(Portugal) Belenenses	Free
24 July 2009	(Portugal) Maciel	(Portugal) União de Leiria	(Portugal) Trofense	Loan
27 July 2009	(Serbia) Milan Stepanov	(Portugal) Porto	(Spain) Málaga	Loan
29 July 2009	(Portugal) Miguel Fidalgo	(Portugal) Nacional	(Portugal) Académica de Coimbra	Loan
31 July 2009	(Brazil) Júlio César	(Portugal) Belenenses	(Portugal) Benfica	€500,000
8 August 2009	(Portugal) Igor Pita	(Portugal) Nacional	(Portugal) Beira-Mar	Loan
12 August 2009	(Portugal) Hugo Santos	(Portugal) Naval	(Portugal) Operário	Free
17 August 2009	(Algeria) Kheireddine Zarabi	(Portugal) Belenenses	(Portugal) Vitória de Setúbal	Free
17 August 2009	(Argentina) Nelson Benítez	(Portugal) Porto	(Portugal) Leixões	Loan
21 August 2009	(Portugal) Beto	(Spain) Recreativo Huelva	(Portugal) Belenenses	Free
24 August 2009	(Brazil) Adriano	(Portugal) Porto	(Portugal) Braga	Free
26 August 2009	(Portugal) Amaury Bischoff	(England) Arsenal	(Portugal) Académica de Coimbra	Free
26 August 2009	(Algeria) Mehdi Kerrouche	(France) Gazélec Ajaccio	(Portugal) Naval	Free
28 August 2009	(Brazil) Felipe Menezes	(Brazil) Goiás	(Portugal) Benfica	Undisclosed
29 August 2009	(Portugal) Nuno Coelho	(Portugal) Porto	(Portugal) Académica de Coimbra	Free
29 August 2009	(Portugal) Bruno Vale	(Portugal) Porto	(Portugal) Belenenses	Loan
29 August 2009	(Spain) Miguel Ángel Angulo	(Spain) Valencia	(Portugal) Sporting CP	Free
29 August 2009	(Brazil) Tiago Luís	(Brazil) Santos	(Portugal) União de Leiria	Loan
29 August 2009	(Brazil) Wênio	(Portugal) Vitória de Guimarães	(Portugal) Leixões	Free
29 August 2009	(Brazil) Jorginho	(Portugal) Braga	(Turkey) Gaziantepspor	Free
30 August 2009	(Austria) Roland Linz	(Portugal) Braga	(Turkey) Gaziantepspor	Undisclosed
30 August 2009	(Ivory Coast) Seydou Koné	(Romania) Botoșani	(Portugal) União de Leiria	Free
30 August 2009	(Senegal) El Hadji Diouf	(Greece) AEK Athens	(Portugal) Vitória de Setúbal	Loan
31 August 2009	(Montenegro) Milan Purović	(Portugal) Sporting CP	(Hungary) Videoton	Loan
31 August 2009	(Portugal) Nuno Frechaut	(Portugal) Braga	(France) Metz	Free
31 August 2009	(Portugal) Ivo Pinto	(Portugal) Porto	(Portugal) Vitória de Setúbal	Loan
31 August 2009	(Brazil) Patric	(Portugal) Benfica	(Brazil) Cruzeiro	Loan
31 August 2009	(Portugal) Tiago Pinto	(Portugal) Sporting CP	(Portugal) Braga	Free

- ^1 A player who signed with a club before the opening of the summer transfer window, will officially join his new club on 1 July. While a player who joined a club after 1 July will join his new club following his signature of the contract.
