= List of Portuguese football transfers summer 2014 =

This is a list of Portuguese football transfers for the summer of 2014. The summer transfer window opened on 1 July and closed at midnight on 1 September. Players may be bought before the transfer windows opens, but may only join their new club on 1 July. Only moves involving Primeira Liga clubs are listed. Additionally, players without a club may join a club at any time.

== Transfers ==
Date	Name	Moving from	Moving to	Fee
30 January 2014	(Colombia) Fredy Montero	(United States) Seattle Sounders FC	(Portugal) Sporting CP	€2,500,000
6 February 2014	(Argentina) Nicolás Otamendi	(Portugal) Porto	(Spain) Valencia	€12,000,000
12 February 2014	(Portugal) Hugo Seco	(Portugal) Benfica Castelo Branco	(Portugal) Académica de Coimbra	Free
13 March 2014	(Brazil) Renato Neto	(Portugal) Sporting CP	(Belgium) Gent	Free
25 March 2014	(Portugal) Vasco Rocha	(Portugal) Desportivo das Aves	(Portugal) Paços de Ferreira	Free
7 April 2014	(Brazil) Elias	(Portugal) Sporting CP	(Brazil) Corinthians	€4,000,000
26 April 2014	(Portugal) Daniel Candeias	(Portugal) Nacional	(Portugal) Benfica	Free
3 May 2014	(Portugal) Edgar Costa	(Portugal) Nacional	(Portugal) Marítimo	Free
6 May 2014	(Brazil) Alan Kardec	(Portugal) Benfica	(Brazil) São Paulo FC	€4,500,000
6 May 2014	(Guinea-Bissau) Bata	(Portugal) Sporting da Covilhã	(Portugal) Nacional	Free
8 May 2014	(Portugal) André Castro	(Portugal) Porto	(Turkey) Kasımpaşa	€3,000,000
11 May 2014	(Portugal) Ricardo	(Portugal) Académica de Coimbra	(Portugal) Porto	Free
13 May 2014	(Brazil) Evandro	(Portugal) Estoril	(Portugal) Porto	Undisclosed
14 May 2014	(Portugal) Edinho	(Portugal) Braga	(Turkey) Kayseri Erciyesspor	€500,000
14 May 2014	(Guinea) Boubacar Fofana	(Portugal) Tondela	(Portugal) Nacional	Free
16 May 2014	(Nigeria) Anderson Esiti	(Portugal) Leixões	(Portugal) Estoril	Free
19 May 2014	(Bulgaria) Simeon Slavchev	(Bulgaria) Litex Lovech	(Portugal) Sporting CP	€2,500,000
19 May 2014	(Portugal) Paulo Oliveira	(Portugal) Vitória de Guimarães	(Portugal) Sporting CP	Undisclosed
20 May 2014	(Poland) Paweł Dawidowicz	(Poland) Lechia Gdańsk	(Portugal) Benfica	Undisclosed
20 May 2014	(Paraguay) Derlis González	(Portugal) Benfica	(Switzerland) Basel	Free
22 May 2014	(Ghana) Daniel Opare	(Belgium) Standard Liège	(Portugal) Porto	Free
24 May 2014	(Argentina) Juan Iturbe	(Portugal) Porto	(Italy) Verona	€15,000,000
28 May 2014	(Portugal) Rui Miguel	(Portugal) Moreirense	(Portugal) Penafiel	Free
28 May 2014	(Portugal) Capela	(Portugal) Académico de Viseu	(Portugal) Penafiel	Free
29 May 2014	(Guinea-Bissau) Leocísio Sami	(Portugal) Marítimo	(Portugal) Porto	Free
29 May 2014	(Brazil) Nelsinho	(Portugal) Portimonense	(Portugal) Arouca	Free
29 May 2014	(Portugal) Roberto	(Portugal) Arouca	(Russia) Tosno	Free
31 May 2014	(Uruguay) Mauro Goicoechea	(Romania) Oțelul Galați	(Portugal) Arouca	Free
31 May 2014	(Burkina Faso) Stéphane Dasse	(Portugal) Arouca	(Portugal) União da Madeira	Free
2 June 2014	(Portugal) Pedro Santos	(Portugal) Penafiel	(Portugal) Académico de Viseu	Free
3 June 2014	(Spain) Oriol Rosell	(United States) Sporting Kansas City	(Portugal) Sporting CP	Undisclosed
4 June 2014	(Brazil) Aderlan	(Brazil) Corinthians Alagoano	(Portugal) Académica de Coimbra	Free
4 June 2014	(Brazil) Edimar	(Portugal) Rio Ave	(Italy) Chievo Verona	Free
4 June 2014	(Portugal) Jorge Monteiro	(Cyprus) AEL Limassol	(Portugal) Moreirense	Free
5 June 2014	(Brazil) Djavan	(Brazil) Corinthians Alagoano	(Portugal) Benfica	Undisclosed
5 June 2014	(Portugal) Jorge Santos	(Portugal) Padroense	(Portugal) Sporting CP	Free
6 June 2014	(Cape Verde) Kay	(Portugal) Belenenses	(Romania) Universitatea Craiova	Free
6 June 2014	(Portugal) Afonso Taira	(Spain) Córdoba	(Portugal) Estoril	Free
6 June 2014	(Portugal) Paulo Grilo	(Portugal) Académica de Coimbra	(Portugal) Penafiel	Free
8 June 2014	(Portugal) Bruninho	(Portugal) Vitória de Setúbal	(Portugal) Penafiel	Free
8 June 2014	(Portugal) Luís Pimenta	(Portugal) Limianos	(Portugal) Boavista	Free
8 June 2014	(Portugal) Mário Palmeira	(Portugal) Tondela	(Portugal) Belenenses	Free
9 June 2014	(Portugal) Artur Moreira	(Portugal) Marítimo	(Portugal) Arouca	Free
9 June 2014	(Portugal) Jordão Diogo	(Greece) Panthrakikos	(Portugal) Vitória de Setúbal	Free
9 June 2014	(Portugal) Fábio Lopes	(Portugal) Famalicão	(Portugal) Boavista	Free
9 June 2014	(Cape Verde) Mailó	(Portugal) Leixões	(Portugal) Belenenses	Free
10 June 2014	(Portugal) André Geraldes	(Turkey) İstanbul BB	(Portugal) Sporting CP	Undisclosed
10 June 2014	(Cape Verde) Brito	(Portugal) Gil Vicente	(Portugal) Boavista	Free
11 June 2014	(Brazil) Marcelo Goiano	(Brazil) Grêmio Anápolis	(Portugal) Braga	Undisclosed
12 June 2014	(Portugal) Nuno Santos	(Portugal) Paços de Ferreira	(Portugal) Tondela	Free
12 June 2014	(Portugal) André Leão	(Portugal) Paços de Ferreira	(Spain) Real Valladolid	Free
12 June 2014	(Portugal) David Caiado	(Ukraine) Tavriya Simferopol	(Portugal) Vitória de Guimarães	Free
13 June 2014	(Portugal) João Pedro	(Portugal) Estoril	(Portugal) Penafiel	Free
14 June 2014	(Ivory Coast) Adama Traoré	(Australia) Melbourne Victory	(Portugal) Vitória de Guimarães	Free
14 June 2014	(Portugal) Tomás Dabó	(Portugal) Braga	(Portugal) Arouca	Free
14 June 2014	(Uganda) Alex Kakuba	(Portugal) Sporting da Covilhã	(Portugal) Estoril	Free
15 June 2014	(Portugal) Gonçalo Santos	(Portugal) Estoril	(Croatia) Dinamo Zagreb	€800,000
16 June 2014	(Poland) Pawel Kieszek	(Portugal) Vitória Setúbal	(Portugal) Estoril	Free
16 June 2014	(Brazil) Cássio	(Portugal) Arouca	(Portugal) Rio Ave	Free
16 June 2014	(Portugal) Bruno Moreira	(Portugal) Chaves	(Portugal) Paços de Ferreira	Free
17 June 2014	(Uruguay) Jonathan Rodríguez	(Uruguay) Peñarol	(Portugal) Braga	€5,900,000
17 June 2014	(Portugal) Filipe Nascimento	(Portugal) Benfica	(Portugal) Académico de Viseu	Free
17 June 2014	(Portugal) Bernardo Tengarrinha	(Portugal) Chaves	(Portugal) Boavista	Free
17 June 2014	(Portugal) Nélson	(Portugal) Chaves	(Portugal) Penafiel	Free
17 June 2014	(Portugal) Ricardo Batista	(Portugal) Nacional	(Portugal) Vitória de Setúbal	Free
18 June 2014	(Brazil) Diego Barcelos	(Portugal) Nacional	(Cyprus) AEL Limassol	Free
18 June 2014	(Brazil) Douglas Abner	(Brazil) Corinthians	(Portugal) Boavista	Free
18 June 2014	(Brazil) Alex dos Santos	(Romania) Pandurii Târgu Jiu	(Portugal) Moreirense	Loan
19 June 2014	(Mozambique) Mexer	(Portugal) Nacional	(France) Rennes	Undisclosed
20 June 2014	(Bolivia) Bolívia	(Thailand) Muangthong United	(Portugal) Moreirense	Free
20 June 2014	(Portugal) João Afonso	(Portugal) Benfica Castelo Branco	(Portugal) Vitória de Guimarães	Free
20 June 2014	(Brazil) César	(Brazil) Ponte Preta	(Portugal) Benfica	Undisclosed
22 June 2014	(Guinea-Bissau) Rachide Forbes	(Portugal) Sporting da Covilhã	(Portugal) Vitória de Setúbal	Free
22 June 2014	(Japan) Junya Tanaka	(Japan) Kashiwa Reysol	(Portugal) Sporting CP	€500,000
22 June 2014	(Portugal) Diogo Ribeiro	(Portugal) Braga	(Poland) Lechia Gdańsk	Free
22 June 2014	(Democratic Republic of the Congo) Christopher Oualembo	(Poland) Lechia Gdańsk	(Portugal) Académica de Coimbra	Free
23 June 2014	(Portugal) Nuno Henrique	(Poland) Jagiellonia Białystok	(Portugal) Penafiel	Free
23 June 2014	(Mali) Ulysse Diallo	(Hungary) Ferencváros	(Portugal) Arouca	Free
23 June 2014	(Brazil) Leonel Olímpio	(Portugal) Vitória de Guimarães	(Moldova) Sheriff Tiraspol	Free
23 June 2014	(Brazil) Wallace	(Brazil) Cruzeiro	(Portugal) Braga	Free
23 June 2014	(Switzerland) Loris Benito	(Switzerland) Zürich	(Portugal) Benfica	Undisclosed
24 June 2014	(Cape Verde) Djaniny	(Portugal) Nacional	(Mexico) Santos Laguna	Undisclosed
24 June 2014	(Portugal) Tiago Borges	(Portugal) Moreirense	(Portugal) Académico de Viseu	Free
24 June 2014	(Portugal) Mika	(Portugal) Atlético CP	(Portugal) Boavista	Free
24 June 2014	(Brazil) Diego Lima	(Portugal) Atlético CP	(Portugal) Boavista	Free
25 June 2014	(Argentina) Ezequiel Garay	(Portugal) Benfica	(Russia) Zenit	€6,000,000
25 June 2014	(Brazil) Fernando	(Portugal) Porto	(England) Manchester City	€15,000,000
26 June 2014	(Guinea-Bissau) Abel Camará	(Portugal) Beira-Mar	(Portugal) Belenenses	Free
26 June 2014	(Portugal) Fábio Nunes	(Italy) Latina Calcio	(Portugal) Belenenses	Free
26 June 2014	(Cape Verde) Kuca Alves	(Portugal) Chaves	(Portugal) Estoril	Free
27 June 2014	(Brazil) Lucas	(Hungary) Kaposvár	(Portugal) Boavista	Free
27 June 2014	(Portugal) Jota	(Portugal) Nacional	(Portugal) União da Madeira	Loan
27 June 2014	(Argentina) Matías Degra	(Portugal) Paços de Ferreira	(Moldova) Sheriff Tiraspol	Free
27 June 2014	(Portugal) Tiago Gomes	(Portugal) Estoril	(Portugal) Braga	Free
27 June 2014	(Portugal) Carlitos	(Portugal) Estoril	(Switzerland) Sion	Free
28 June 2014	(Chile) Igor Lichnovsky	Universidad de Chile	(Portugal) Porto	Undisclosed
28 June 2014	(Argentina) Daniel Monllor	(Argentina) Nueva Chicago	(Portugal) Boavista	Free
28 June 2014	(Portugal) Fábio Martins	(Portugal) Desportivo das Aves	(Portugal) Braga	Free
29 June 2014	(South Korea) Suk Hyun-jun	(Saudi Arabia) Al-Ahli	(Portugal) Nacional	Free
29 June 2014	(Senegal) Mamadou Ba	(Portugal) Oliveirense	(Portugal) Boavista	Free
30 June 2014	(Brazil) Sandro Lima	(Portugal) Rio Ave	(Portugal) Académico de Viseu	Loan
1 July 2014	(Uruguay) Franco Acosta	(Uruguay) Fénix	(Portugal) Braga	Free
1 July 2014	(Brazil) Derley	(Portugal) Marítimo	(Portugal) Benfica	Undisclosed
1 July 2014	(Brazil) Luís Felipe	(Portugal) Palmeiras	(Portugal) Benfica	Free
2 July 2014	(Brazil) William Soares	(Portugal) Rio Ave	(Portugal) União da Madeira	Free
2 July 2014	(Brazil) Diego Carlos	(Brazil) Madureira	(Portugal) Estoril	Free
2 July 2014	(Brazil) Fernandinho	(Brazil) Madureira	(Portugal) Estoril	Free
2 July 2014	(Portugal) Tiago Valente	(Portugal) Paços de Ferreira	(Poland) Lechia Gdańsk	Free
2 July 2014	(Cape Verde) Rony Santos	(Portugal) Benfica	(Portugal) Nacional	Free
2 July 2014	(Argentina) Lucas Colitto	(Argentina) Defensores de Belgrano	(Portugal) Arouca	Free
2 July 2014	(Scotland) Ryan Gauld	(Scotland) Dundee United	(Portugal) Sporting CP	Undisclosed
3 July 2014	(France) Frédéric Mendy	(Portugal) Estoril	(Portugal) União da Madeira	Loan
3 July 2014	(Senegal) Idris	(Portugal) Moreirense	(Portugal) Boavista	Free
3 July 2014	(Brazil) Anderson Correia	(Brazil) SC São Paulo	(Portugal) Boavista	Free
3 July 2014	(Portugal) Pedro Tiba	(Portugal) Vitória de Setúbal	(Portugal) Braga	€500,000
3 July 2014	(Egypt) Marwan Mohsen	(Egypt) Petrojet	(Portugal) Gil Vicente	Free
3 July 2014	(Paraguay) Francisco López	(Paraguay) Cerro Porteño PF	(Portugal) Boavista	Free
3 July 2014	(Hungary) Benjamin Balázs	(Hungary) Kaposvár	(Portugal) Vitória de Guimarães	Free
3 July 2014	(Brazil) Tarcísio	(Portugal) Moreirense	(Portugal) Chaves	Free
3 July 2014	(Spain) Óliver Torres	(Spain) Atlético Madrid	(Portugal) Porto	Loan
4 July 2014	(Portugal) Elton Monteiro	(Belgium) Club Brugge	(Portugal) Braga	Free
4 July 2014	(Serbia) Filip Knežević	(Serbia) Partizan	(Portugal) Vitória de Guimarães	Free
4 July 2014	(Uruguay) Jorge Fucile	(Portugal) Porto	(Uruguay) Nacional	Free
4 July 2014	(Portugal) Bruno Moreira	(Portugal) Chaves	(Portugal) Paços de Ferreira	Free
4 July 2014	(Portugal) Tony	(Portugal) Paços de Ferreira	(Portugal) Penafiel	Free
4 July 2014	(Uruguay) Agustín Peña	(Uruguay) Liverpool Montevideo	(Portugal) Boavista	Free
4 July 2014	(Ivory Coast) Kódjo Alphonse	(Portugal) Gil Vicente	(Portugal) Académico de Viseu	Loan
4 July 2014	(Brazil) Danielson	(Portugal) Gil Vicente	(Portugal) Moreirense	Free
4 July 2014	(Brazil) Matheus	(Brazil) América	(Portugal) Braga	Free
4 July 2014	(France) Prince-Désir Gouano	(Italy) Atalanta	(Portugal) Rio Ave	Free
4 July 2014	(Brazil) Evaldo	(Portugal) Sporting CP	(Portugal) Gil Vicente	Free
5 July 2014	(Portugal) Tó Zé	(Portugal) Porto	(Portugal) Estoril	Loan
5 July 2014	(Portugal) Diogo Coelho	(Portugal) Nacional	(Portugal) Sporting da Covilhã	Loan
5 July 2014	(Burkina Faso) Lassina Touré	(Portugal) Vitória de Guimarães	(Portugal) Marítimo	Free
5 July 2014	(Brazil) Victor Golas	(Portugal) Sporting CP	(Portugal) Braga	Free
5 July 2014	(Brazil) Nildo Petrolina	(Hungary) Videoton	(Portugal) Arouca	Free
5 July 2014	(Brazil) Talisca	(Brazil) Bahia	(Portugal) Benfica	€4,000,000
6 July 2014	(Greece) Dimitrios Pelkas	(Greece) PAOK	(Portugal) Vitória de Setúbal	Loan
6 July 2014	(Portugal) Nuno André Coelho	(Portugal) Braga	(Turkey) Balıkesirspor	Free
7 July 2014	(Brazil) Anselmo	(Brazil) São Caetano	(Portugal) Nacional	Free
7 July 2014	(Germany) Lukas Raeder	(Germany) Bayern Munich	(Portugal) Vitória de Setúbal	Free
7 July 2014	(Portugal) Pedro Coronas	(Portugal) Vitória de Setúbal	(Portugal) Moreirense	Free
8 July 2014	(Portugal) Rui Pedro	(Romania) Cluj	(Portugal) Académica de Coimbra	Free
8 July 2014	(Portugal) Rabiola	(Portugal) Braga	(Portugal) Penafiel	Free
9 July 2014	(Paraguay) Jorge Rojas	(Portugal) Benfica	(Argentina) Gimnasia y Esgrima	Loan
9 July 2014	(Egypt) Hossam Hassan	(Egypt) Al-Masry	(Portugal) Gil Vicente	Free
9 July 2014	(Portugal) Arsénio Nunes	(Portugal) Belenenses	(Portugal) Moreirense	Free
10 July 2014	(Brazil) Victor Andrade	(Brazil) Santos	(Portugal) Benfica	Free
11 July 2014	(Portugal) Luís Dias	(Portugal) Arouca	(Portugal) Santa Clara	Free
12 July 2014	(Spain) Adrián López	(Spain) Atlético Madrid	(Portugal) Porto	€11,000,000
12 July 2014	(Portugal) Ricardo Horta	(Portugal) Vitória de Setúbal	(Spain) Málaga	Free
12 July 2014	(Egypt) Mahmoud Ezzat	(Egypt) Arab Contractors	(Portugal) Nacional	Loan
12 July 2014	(Egypt) Ali Fathy	(Egypt) Arab Contractors	(Portugal) Nacional	Loan
12 July 2014	(Cape Verde) Diney	(Portugal) Vitória de Setúbal	(Portugal) Marítimo	Free
14 July 2014	(Brazil) Marcelo Oliveira	(Cyprus) APOEL	(Portugal) Moreirense	Free
14 July 2014	(Portugal) Hélio Cruz	(Portugal) Joane	(Portugal) Moreirense	Free
14 July 2014	(Cape Verde) Patrick Andrade	(Portugal) Ribeirão	(Portugal) Moreirense	Free
14 July 2014	(Algeria) Rafik Halliche	(Portugal) Académica de Coimbra	Qatar SC	Free
15 July 2014	(Serbia) Lazar Marković	(Portugal) Benfica	(England) Liverpool	€25,000,000
15 July 2014	(Portugal) Tiago Ferreira	(Portugal) Porto	(Belgium) Zulte Waregem	Free
15 July 2014	(Brazil) Rodrigo Defendi	(Brazil) Vitória	(Portugal) Vitória de Guimarães	Free
15 July 2014	(Ivory Coast) Gui	(Portugal) Sporting da Covilhã	(Portugal) Vitória de Guimarães	Free
16 July 2014	(Spain) Cristian Tello	(Spain) Barcelona	(Portugal) Porto	Loan
16 July 2014	(Netherlands) Bruno Martins Indi	(Netherlands) Feyenoord	(Portugal) Porto	€7,700,000
16 July 2014	(Portugal) Renato Santos	(Portugal) Rio Ave	(Portugal) Beira-Mar	Loan
16 July 2014	(Peru) William Mimbela	(Peru) Sporting Cristal	(Portugal) Nacional	Free
16 July 2014	(Portugal) Jorge Chula	(Portugal) Marítimo	(Portugal) Desportivo das Aves	Free
16 July 2014	(Slovenia) Jan Oblak	(Portugal) Benfica	(Spain) Atlético Madrid	€16,000,000
16 July 2014	(Russia) Marat Izmailov	(Portugal) Porto	(Russia) Krasnodar	Loan
16 July 2014	(Serbia) Stefan Mitrović	(Portugal) Benfica	(Germany) SC Freiburg	€1,175,000
17 July 2014	(Portugal) André Gomes	(Portugal) Benfica	(Spain) Valencia	Loan
17 July 2014	(Nigeria) Nwankwo Obiora	(Spain) Córdoba	(Portugal) Académica de Coimbra	Free
17 July 2014	(Portugal) João Pedro	(Portugal) Braga	(Portugal) Moreirense	Loan
17 July 2014	(Portugal) André Marques	(Switzerland) Sion	(Portugal) Moreirense	Free
18 July 2014	(France) Alvin Arrondel	(France) Paris Saint-Germain	(Portugal) Vitória de Guimarães	Free
18 July 2014	(Turkey) Sinan Bolat	(Portugal) Porto	(Turkey) Galatasaray	Loan
18 July 2014	(Brazil) Casemiro	(Spain) Real Madrid	(Portugal) Porto	Loan
18 July 2014	(Brazil) Gideão Castro	(Brazil) Náutico	(Portugal) Moreirense	Free
19 July 2014	(Portugal) Marco Matias	(Portugal) Vitória de Guimarães	(Portugal) Nacional	Free
19 July 2014	(Brazil) Rodrigo Dantas	(Brazil) Botafogo	(Portugal) Belenenses	Free
20 July 2014	(Argentina) Fabián Rinaudo	(Portugal) Sporting CP	(Italy) Catania	€3,000,000
20 July 2014	(Portugal) Joãozinho	(Portugal) Braga	(Moldova) Sheriff Tiraspol	Free
20 July 2014	(Portugal) Wilson Eduardo	(Portugal) Sporting CP	(Croatia) Dinamo Zagreb	Loan
21 July 2014	(Portugal) Diogo Salomão	(Portugal) Sporting CP	(Spain) Deportivo La Coruña	Loan
21 July 2014	(Angola) Djalma Campos	(Portugal) Porto	(Turkey) Torku Konyaspor	Loan
22 July 2014	(Portugal) Gonçalo Brandão	(Italy) Parma	(Portugal) Belenenses	Free
22 July 2014	(Guinea-Bissau) Zézinho	(Portugal) Sporting CP	(Cyprus) AEL Limassol	Loan
22 July 2014	(Brazil) João Schmidt	(Brazil) São Paulo FC	(Portugal) Vitória de Setúbal	Loan
22 July 2014	(Portugal) João Coimbra	(Portugal) Estoril	(Portugal) Académico de Viseu	Free
22 July 2014	(Cape Verde) Igor Lopes	(Portugal) Rio Ave	(Portugal) Académico de Viseu	Loan
22 July 2014	(Paraguay) Ramón Cardozo	(Paraguay) Nacional	(Portugal) Vitória de Guimarães	Free
22 July 2014	(Portugal) Duarte Machado	(Portugal) Belenenses	(Portugal) Olhanense	Free
22 July 2014	(Brazil) Marcos Vinicius	(Portugal) Rio Claro	(Portugal) Vitória de Setúbal	Free
23 July 2014	(Algeria) Yacine Brahimi	(Spain) Granada	(Portugal) Porto	€6,500,000
23 July 2014	(Serbia) Filip Đuričić	(Portugal) Benfica	(Germany) 1. FSV Mainz 05	Loan
23 July 2014	(Portugal) Miguelito	(Portugal) Moreirense	(Portugal) Chaves	Loan
23 July 2014	(Portugal) Eliseu	(Spain) Málaga	(Portugal) Benfica	Undisclosed
23 July 2014	(Brazil) Lee Winston	(Brazil) Atlético Mineiro	(Portugal) Académica de Coimbra	Free
23 July 2014	(Spain) Rodrigo	(Portugal) Benfica	(Spain) Valencia	Loan
25 July 2014	(Argentina) Rogelio Funes Mori	(Portugal) Benfica	(Turkey) Eskişehirspor	Loan
25 July 2014	(Brazil) Schumacher	(Brazil) Ferroviária	(Portugal) Académica de Coimbra	Free
25 July 2014	(Portugal) Bebé	(England) Manchester United	(Portugal) Benfica	Undisclosed
25 July 2014	(Brazil) Gladstone	(Brazil) Cabofriense	(Portugal) Gil Vicente	Free
27 July 2014	(France) Mouhamadou-Naby Sarr	(France) Lyon	(Portugal) Sporting CP	€1,000,000
27 July 2014	(Argentina) Luis Fariña	(Portugal) Benfica	(Spain) Deportivo La Coruña	Loan
28 July 2014	(Paraguay) Ramón Cardozo	(Paraguay) Nacional	(Portugal) Moreirense	Free
29 July 2014	(Spain) José Ángel	(Italy) Roma	(Portugal) Porto	Free
30 July 2014	(Guinea-Bissau) Gerso Fernandes	(Portugal) Estoril	(Portugal) Moreirense	Loan
31 July 2014	(England) Eric Dier	(Portugal) Sporting CP	(England) Tottenham Hotspur	€5,000,000
2 August 2014	(Argentina) Valentín Viola	(Portugal) Sporting CP	(Turkey) Karabükspor	Loan
2 August 2014	(Brazil) Djavan	(Portugal) Benfica	(Portugal) Braga	€1,000,000
4 August 2014	(Egypt) Ramy Rabia	(Egypt) Al Ahly	(Portugal) Sporting CP	€750,000
4 August 2014	(Senegal) Abdoulaye Ba	(Portugal) Porto	(Spain) Rayo Vallecano	Loan
4 August 2014	(Portugal) Licá	(Portugal) Porto	(Spain) Rayo Vallecano	Loan
4 August 2014	(Paraguay) Óscar Cardozo	(Portugal) Benfica	(Turkey) Trabzonspor	€5,000,000
7 August 2014	(Portugal) Ivan Cavaleiro	(Portugal) Benfica	(Spain) Deportivo La Coruña	Loan
7 August 2014	(Portugal) Bernardo Silva	(Portugal) Benfica	(France) Monaco	Loan
8 August 2014	(Portugal) Josué	(Portugal) Porto	(Turkey) Bursaspor	Loan
8 August 2014	(Spain) Andrés Fernández	(Spain) Osasuna	(Portugal) Porto	€1,650,000
8 August 2014	(Brazil) Rodrigo Galo	(Portugal) Braga	(Portugal) Paços de Ferreira	Free
9 August 2014	(Argentina) Jonathan Silva	(Argentina) Estudiantes de La Plata	(Portugal) Sporting CP	Undisclosed
11 August 2014	(Spain) Iván Marcano	(Russia) Rubin Kazan	(Portugal) Porto	Undisclosed
14 August 2014	(Belgium) Steven Defour	(Portugal) Porto	(Belgium) Anderlecht	€6,000,000
18 August 2014	(Portugal) Vítor Gomes	(Hungary) Videoton	(Portugal) Moreirense	Free
18 August 2014	(Argentina) Rodrigo Battaglia	(Portugal) Braga	(Portugal) Moreirense	Loan
19 August 2014	(Argentina) Marcos Rojo	(Portugal) Sporting CP	(England) Manchester United	€20,000,000
19 August 2014	(Portugal) Nani	(England) Manchester United	(Portugal) Sporting CP	Loan
19 August 2014	(Brazil) Júlio César	(England) Queens Park Rangers	(Portugal) Benfica	Free
20 August 2014	(Portugal) João Cancelo	(Portugal) Benfica	(Spain) Valencia	Loan
22 August 2014	(Greece) Andreas Samaris	(Greece) Olympiacos	(Portugal) Benfica	€10,000,000
23 August 2014	(Portugal) Daniel Candeias	(Portugal) Benfica	(Germany) 1. FC Nürnberg	Loan
24 August 2014	(Cameroon) Vincent Aboubakar	(France) Lorient	(Portugal) Porto	€3,000,000
24 August 2014	(Portugal) Silvestre Varela	(Portugal) Porto	(England) West Bromwich Albion	Loan
24 August 2014	(Portugal) Rúben Semedo	(Portugal) Sporting CP	(Spain) Reus	Loan
25 August 2014	(Brazil) Edson Farias	(Hungary) Videoton	(Portugal) Paços de Ferreira	Free
25 August 2014	(Austria) Kevin Friesenbichler	(Portugal) Benfica	(Poland) Lechia Gdańsk	Loan
26 August 2014	(Portugal) Vítor Silva	(Portugal) Sporting CP	(Spain) Reus	Free
27 August 2014	(Iran) Alireza Haghighi	(Russia) Rubin Kazan	(Portugal) Penafiel	Loan
28 August 2014	(France) Hadi Sacko	(France) Bordeaux	(Portugal) Sporting CP	€1,400,000
30 August 2014	(Spain) Lolo	(Portugal) Benfica	(Spain) Lugo	Loan
31 August 2014	(Portugal) Mickaël Meira	(Portugal) Sporting CP	(Cyprus) AEL Limassol	Free
31 August 2014	(Brazil) Leandro Souza	(Cyprus) Doxa Katokopias	(Portugal) Moreirense	Free
31 August 2014	(Portugal) Hugo Ventura	(Portugal) Rio Ave	(Portugal) Belenenses	Free
1 September 2014	(Portugal) Betinho	(Portugal) Sporting CP	(England) Brentford	Loan
1 September 2014	(Portugal) Luís Martins	(Portugal) Gil Vicente	(Spain) Granada	Undisclosed
1 September 2014	(Colombia) Héctor Quiñones	(Portugal) Porto	(Portugal) Penafiel	Loan
1 September 2014	(Brazil) Carlos Eduardo	(Portugal) Porto	(France) Nice	Loan
1 September 2014	(Portugal) Hugo Vieira	(Portugal) Braga	(Russia) Torpedo Moscow	€150,000
1 September 2014	(Uruguay) Jonathan Urretaviscaya	(Portugal) Benfica	(Portugal) Paços de Ferreira	Free
1 September 2014	(Brazil) David Batista	(Brazil) Sampaio Corrêa	(Portugal) Gil Vicente	Free
1 September 2014	(Brazil) João Pedro Galvão	(Portugal) Estoril	(Italy) Cagliari	Undisclosed
1 September 2014	(Uruguay) Matías Cabrera	(Italy) Cagliari	(Portugal) Estoril	Free
1 September 2014	(Brazil) Otávio	(Brazil) Internacional	(Portugal) Porto	Undisclosed
1 September 2014	(Algeria) Nabil Ghilas	(Portugal) Porto	(Spain) Córdoba	Loan
1 September 2014	(Guinea-Bissau) Leocísio Sami	(Portugal) Porto	(Portugal) Braga	Loan
1 September 2014	(Portugal) Bruno Gaspar	(Portugal) Benfica	(Portugal) Vitória de Guimarães	Loan
1 September 2014	(Brazil) Kléber	(Portugal) Porto	(Portugal) Estoril	Loan
1 September 2014	(Brazil) Diego Carlos	(Portugal) Estoril	(Portugal) Porto	Loan
1 September 2014	(Italy) Bryan Cristante	(Italy) AC Milan	(Portugal) Benfica	Undisclosed
1 September 2014	(Portugal) Sílvio	(Spain) Atlético Madrid	(Portugal) Benfica	Loan
1 September 2014	(Brazil) Jander	(Portugal) Olhanense	(Portugal) Gil Vicente	Free
1 September 2014	(Brazil) Sidnei	(Portugal) Benfica	(Spain) Deportivo La Coruña	Loan
1 September 2014	(Spain) José Campaña	(Italy) Sampdoria	(Portugal) Porto	Loan

- ^1 A player who signed with a club before the opening of the summer transfer window, will officially join his new club on 1 July. While a player who joined a club after 1 July will join his new club following his signature of the contract.
