= Carlos Manuel (footballer, born 1985) =

Portuguese footballer

Personal information
- Full name: Carlos Manuel Gouveia Silva
- Date of birth: 24 November 1985 (age 40)
- Place of birth: Maracay, Venezuela
- Height: 1.75 m (5 ft 9 in)
- Position: Right-back

Team information
- Current team: Porto da Cruz

Youth career
- 1999–2002: Santana
- 2002–2004: Nacional

Senior career*
Years	Team	Apps	(Gls)
2004–2005	Nacional	0	(0)
2005–2010	Camacha	126	(1)
2010–2017	União Madeira	122	(1)
2017–2018	Camacha	18	(0)
2018–	Porto da Cruz	67	(2)
- * Club domestic league appearances and goals as of 17:39, 12 July 2023 (UTC)

Carlos Manuel Gouveia Silva (born 24 November 1985), known as Carlos Manuel, is a Portuguese professional footballer who plays for Associação Desportiva Porto da Cruz as a right-back.

== Club career ==
Born in Maracay, Venezuela to Portuguese parents, Carlos Manuel returned to the land of his ancestors and settled in the island of Madeira, where he would spend his entire professional career. He started out at U.D. Santana, then signed with C.D. Nacional for his last two formative years.

After five seasons in the lower leagues with A.D. Camacha, Carlos Manuel joined C.F. União in the 2010 off-season. He played only seven games in his first year, as his team won the third division championship; his professional debut came on 21 August 2011, when he featured the full 90 minutes in a 3–2 home win over C.D. Aves in the Segunda Liga.

Another promotion befell at the end of the 2014–15 campaign, and Carlos Manuel contributed 26 matches to this feat with (24 starts). He made his debut in the Primeira Liga on 26 October 2015, coming on as a 64th-minute substitute for Joãozinho in the 1–0 away loss against C.F. Os Belenenses.
