= Gil Barros =

Portuguese footballer

Pedro Gil Barros Silva (4 July 1991, in Lordelo – ? in Paredes) known as Gil Barros, is a Portuguese footballer who plays for C.F. União as a defender.

== Career ==
On 27 July 2013, Barros made his professional debut with União Madeira in a 2013–14 Taça da Liga match against Trofense, when he started and played the full game.
