= Ludgério Silva =

São Tomé and Príncipe footballer

Personal information
- Full name: Ludgério de Almeida Santiago da Silva
- Date of birth: 14 August 1986 (age 40)
- Place of birth: Lobata, São Tomé and Príncipe
- Height: 1.72 m (5 ft 8 in)
- Positions: Right midfielder; striker

Youth career
- –2006: Progresso

Senior career*
Years	Team	Apps	(Gls)
2006–2007	Infesta	16	(3)
2007–2009	Progresso		
2009–2010	União Nogueirense	33	(11)
2010–2011	Padroense	26	(8)
2011–2012	União Madeira	21	(4)
2012–2014	Paços de Ferreira	0	(0)
2012–2014	→ União Madeira (loan)	90	(16)
2014–2015	Bravos do Maquis	12	(1)
2015–2017	Cinfães	36	(1)
2017–2019	Coimbrões	54	(15)
2019–2020	Covilhã	8	(0)

International career^{‡}
2015–2019	São Tomé and Príncipe	6	(1)
- * Club domestic league appearances and goals as of 2020 ‡ National team caps and goals as of 2020

Ludgério de Almeida Santiago da Silva (born 14 August 1986) is a São Tomean retired footballer who played as a midfielder. He also holds Portuguese citizenship.

Silva has previously played for Infesta, Progresso, União Nogueirense, Padroense and Paços de Ferreira.

== International career ==
=== International goals ===
Scores and results list São Tomé and Príncipe's goal tally first.

No.	Date	Venue	Opponent	Score	Result	Competition
1.	9 October 2019	Anjalay Stadium, Belle Vue Harel, Mauritius	Mauritius	3–1	3–1	2021 Africa Cup of Nations qualification
