= Hugo Morais =

Portuguese footballer

Personal information
- Full name: Hugo Eduardo dos Santos Morais
- Date of birth: 12 February 1978 (age 48)
- Place of birth: Lisbon, Portugal
- Height: 1.81 m (5 ft 11 1/2 in)
- Position: Midfielder

Youth career
- 1989–1994: Benfica
- 1994–1996: Estrela Amadora

Senior career*
Years	Team	Apps	(Gls)
1996–1997	Futebol Benfica		
1997–1998	Casa Pia	30	(1)
1998	Sintrense	1	(0)
1999	Estrela Vendas Novas		
1999–2003	Marítimo B	80	(4)
2000–2004	Marítimo	6	(0)
2001–2002	→ Camacha (loan)	37	(11)
2003–2004	→ União Madeira (loan)	29	(2)
2004–2005	Aves	30	(3)
2005–2006	Barreirense	27	(3)
2006–2010	Leixões	115	(14)
2010–2012	Académica	37	(1)
2012–2014	União Madeira	60	(10)
Total		452	(49)
- * Club domestic league appearances and goals

Hugo Eduardo dos Santos Morais (born 12 February 1978) is a Portuguese former professional footballer who played as a central midfielder.

== Club career ==
Morais was born in Lisbon. After finishing his development at local C.F. Estrela da Amadora's youth system, he played for a series of clubs in the lower leagues. In 1999 he joined C.S. Marítimo, but his spell was very unsuccessful as he only appeared in six Primeira Liga games, also being loaned two times and very often demoted to the reserves, finally being released in June 2004.

Subsequently, Morais played one year for C.D. Aves and F.C. Barreirense in the second division, after which he was left out of work, even having to resort to taking an intensive course for unemployed players arranged by the Portuguese Footballers Association. He was then "rescued" by Leixões SC, scoring three goals in 30 matches as the Matosinhos team returned to the top flight after a lengthy absence.

In the 2009–10 season, Morais netted seven times – all through penalty kicks– whilst only missing one league game, but Leixões dropped down to the second level. On 21 June 2010, aged 32, he signed a two-year contract with Académica de Coimbra.

In the summer of 2012, Morais returned to former club C.F. União (he had already played there in 2003–04 on loan from Madeiran neighbours Marítimo), moving to the second tier side on a free transfer.

== Honours ==
Leixões

- Segunda Liga: 2006–07

Académica

- Taça de Portugal: 2011–12
