= Micael Babo =

Portuguese footballer

Personal information
- Full name: Micael Davide Macedo Babo
- Date of birth: 5 June 1993 (age 33)
- Place of birth: Freixo de Cima, Portugal
- Height: 1.84 m (6 ft 0 in)
- Position: Midfielder

Team information
- Current team: Amarante

Youth career
- 2004–2005: Freixo de Cima
- 2005–2007: Académico Amarante
- 2008–2009: Freixo de Cima
- 2009–2011: Freamunde

Senior career*
| Years | Team | Apps | (Gls) |
| 2011–2013 | Freamunde | 44 | (4) |
| 2013–2014 | União Madeira | 29 | (0) |
| 2015 | Trofense | 20 | (0) |
| 2015–2016 | Oliveirense | 31 | (0) |
| 2016–2020 | São Martinho | 101 | (3) |
| 2020– | Amarante | 51 | (2) |

International career
| 2012–2013 | Portugal U20 | 2 | (0) |
- * Club domestic league appearances and goals as of 07:36, 7 November 2022 (UTC)

Micael Davide Macedo Babo (born 5 June 1993 in Freixo de Cima, Amarante) is a Portuguese footballer who plays for Amarante F.C. as a midfielder.
