= Rúben Andrade =

Portuguese footballer

Personal information
- Full name: Rúben Dinarte Martins Andrade
- Date of birth: 7 June 1982 (age 44)
- Place of birth: Funchal, Portugal
- Height: 1.76 m (5 ft 9 in)
- Position: Midfielder

Youth career
- 1994–1999: Juventude Atlântico
- 1999–2001: União Madeira

Senior career*
Years	Team	Apps	(Gls)
2000–2016	União Madeira	407	(60)
2016–2020	Camacha	84	(16)
2021–2022	Ribeira Brava	15	(0)
Total		506	(76)
- * Club domestic league appearances and goals

Rúben Dinarte Martins Andrade (born 7 June 1982) is a Portuguese former professional footballer who played as a central midfielder.

== Club career ==
Born in Funchal, Madeira, Andrade all but played for his local club C.F. União after signing in 1999 to complete his development. On 18 June 2000, whilst still a junior, he made his debut with the senior team, playing 45 minutes in a 2–0 away win against Juventude Sport Clube in the third division.

In the following seasons, Andrade alternated between the second and third tiers of Portuguese football, playing his first game in the former competition on 3 November 2002 by coming on as a 72nd-minute substitute in a 0–0 home draw against Leça FC. He scored a career-best 11 goals (from 33 appearances) in 2009–10, but the side failed to promote from division three.

Andrade contributed six goals in 41 games in the 2014–15 campaign, as União returned to the Primeira Liga after an absence of more than two decades, and on 1 June 2015 he renewed his contract for another year. His maiden appearance in the competition occurred on 16 August at the age of 33 years and two months, as he started and featured 68 minutes in a 2–1 derby home win over C.S. Marítimo.

== Honours ==
União Madeira

- Segunda Divisão: 2001–02, 2010–11
- Madeira FA Cup: 2002–03, 2004–05
