= União da Bola F.C. =

Association football club in Funchal, Madeira, Portugal

Coordinates: 32°41′25.130″N 17°2′56.558″W

União da Bola
- Full name: União da Bola Futebol Clube
- Nicknames: União da Bola (Union of the ball); Unionistas (Unionists)
- Founded: 30 August 2022; 3 years ago
- Ground: Campo do Adelino Rodrigues, Funchal
- Capacity: 2,000
- Chairman: Rómulo Coelho
- Manager: (Portugal) Alexandre Emanuel Marquês Figueira
- League: AF Madeira 1st Division
Home colours	Away colours

União da Bola Futebol Clube, commonly known as União or União da Bola, is a Portuguese football club based in Funchal, Madeira. The club competes in the 6th tier Madeira 1st Division and plays its home games at the Campo do Adelino Rodrigues.

The club was founded in 2022 as a phoenix club of the former C.F. União, which folded in 2021 and were notable for their six appearances in the Portuguese top-flight Primeira Liga, most recently in the 2015–16 season. The new club was formed with the aim of "honouring the legacy" of the demised club.

== History ==
The club was formed in August 2022, as a phoenix club following the demise of the former C.F. União, which was forcibly dissolved and officially closed on 23 November 2021. Uniao da Bola was founded by a committee in the form of Rómulo Soares Coelho, Hugo Valdemar Fernandes, Ruben Andrade, Tânia Abreu, Nuno Barros Sousa, André Gonçalves and Nuno Açafrão with the intention of fielding a senior team in the 1st Division of the Madeira Regional Championship, the sixth-tier level within the Portuguese football league system. On 8 September 2022, the club was officially registered with the Madeira Football Association, as club number 6103, and registered to the Regional Championship.

The club played its first competitive game on 12 November 2022, a 0–1 defeat away to Choupana FC, whilst one week later, on 19 November, União da Bola secured a historic first victory with a 1–0 win against C.F. Carvalheiro at Campo do Adelino Rodrigues; Rodrigo Gama scored the only goal of the game and the first goal in the history of the new club. In the 2022/2023 sports season, the club ended up in the seventh position among the 8 teams that were competing in the same one. That same result lead to the sacking of the technical staff chiefed by main coach Nuno Gomes. Despite the fact that the first season of the club were not good in general, there were some players who ended up show good quality in their performances. This was the case for the goalie Marcelo Cró; the defenders Pedro Gouveia and Rodrigo Gama; the midfielders Pedro Vieira, Suarez; Bruno Franco and Daniel Rodrigues and finally the forward Luis Sargo.

In the 2023/2024 season under the guidance of Alexandre Figueira, the team had a huge improvement of their quality of game. The club finished 3rd place on a 6th national tier that witnessed the appearance of 10 teams. The most influential player of this season was the striker Nélio Macieira who netted the goal 13 times during his 17 matches. Macieira also ended up being the general best scorer of the league with the referred 13 goals. During the 1st fixture of this season ( Santacruzense vs União da Bola), the fans witnessed a historical comeback against a very difficult opponent. The club was losing 3-0 until the 85 minute of the match, but in a matter of circa 8 minutes the club managed o secure the draw. Promotion to the 5th national tier was not guaranteed only by the margin of 2 points.

== Stadium ==
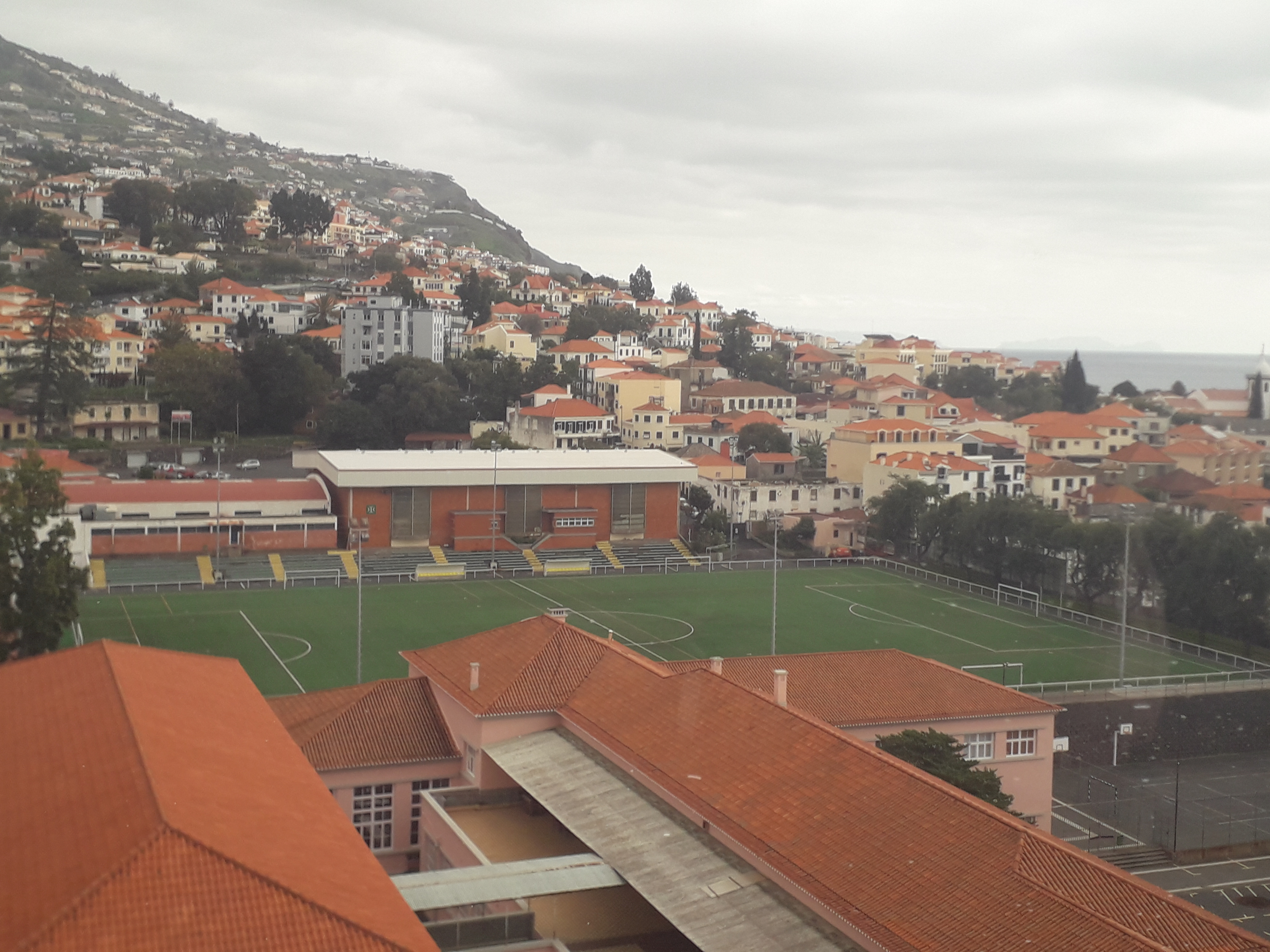
Campo do Adelino Rodrigues

União da Bola adopted the former home stadium of C.F. União, the Campo do Adelino Rodrigues, in the heart of Funchal city centre. União da Bola shares this same stadium with the senior team of Sporting da Madeira and also with the senior team of CF Carvalheiro.

== Managerial history ==
- (Portugal) Nuno Miguel Pinto Gomes (2022– 2023)
- (Portugal) Alexandre Emanuel Marquês Figueira (2023-
