= Bocar Djumo =

Portuguese footballer (born 1994)

Personal information
- Date of birth: 21 August 1994 (age 32)
- Place of birth: Bissau, Guinea-Bissau
- Height: 1.85 m (6 ft 1 in)
- Position: Forward

Youth career
- 2004–2008: Armacenenses
- 2008–2011: Imortal
- 2011–2013: Inter Milan

Senior career*
Years	Team	Apps	(Gls)
2013–2016	Inter Milan	0	(0)
2013	→ União da Madeira (loan)	10	(1)
2014	→ Oțelul Galați (loan)	1	(0)
2014–2015	→ Sliema Wanderers (loan)	18	(6)
2016–2017	Inter Leipzig	29	(25)
2017–2019	Oberlausitz Neugersdorf	79	(17)
2019–2025	Schwarz-Weiß Rehden	134	(36)
2025	Kormákur Hvöt	9	(2)

International career
2012	Portugal U18	3	(0)
2012–2013	Portugal U19	5	(1)
- * Club domestic league appearances and goals as of 16:40, 16 May 2026 (UTC)

Bocar Djumo, (born 21 August 1994), also known as Bocar Oliveira Lopes, is a Portuguese footballer who plays as a forward.

== Career ==
On 17 August 2013, Djumo made his professional debut with União Madeira in a 2013–14 Segunda Liga match against Santa Clara, when he replaced Steve (67th minute).
