= Miguel Fidalgo =

Portuguese footballer

Personal information
- Full name: Nuno Miguel Fidalgo dos Santos
- Date of birth: 19 March 1982 (age 44)
- Place of birth: Caniçal, Portugal
- Height: 1.77 m (5 ft 9 1/2 in)
- Position: Forward

Youth career
- 1993–1995: Caniçal
- 1995–2000: Nacional

Senior career*
Years	Team	Apps	(Gls)
2000–2010	Nacional	65	(6)
2002–2004	→ Camacha (loan)	39	(6)
2006–2007	→ AEK Larnaca (loan)	5	(0)
2007–2008	→ União Madeira (loan)	33	(22)
2009–2010	→ Académica (loan)	12	(4)
2010–2011	Académica	23	(8)
2011–2012	Vitória Setúbal	0	(0)
2013–2016	União Madeira	90	(21)
2016–2018	Camacha	56	(15)
2018–2020	União Madeira	29	(4)
Total		352	(86)
- * Club domestic league appearances and goals

Nuno Miguel Fidalgo dos Santos (born 19 March 1982), known as Fidalgo, is a Portuguese former professional footballer who played as a forward.

== Club career ==
Fidalgo was born in Caniçal. A youth product of C.D. Nacional, he was promoted to the first team in 2000, but only totalled 18 appearances in his first two seasons. Afterwards, he served three consecutive loan stints, two of those with Madeiran neighbours A.D. Camacha and C.F. União in the third division; in between, he spent the 2006–07 campaign with Cypriot First Division club AEK Larnaca FC.

In 2009–10 another loan ensued, now to Académica de Coimbra alongside his teammate Bruno Amaro. The move was made permanent for the following season, and he scored on his league debut on 15 August 2010, helping to defeat title holders S.L. Benfica 2–1 away from home; he finished the campaign as the Students' top scorer, in a narrow escape from relegation from the Primeira Liga.
