= João Martins (footballer, born 1988) =

Portuguese footballer

Personal information
- Full name: João Paulo Neto Martins
- Date of birth: 30 June 1988 (age 38)
- Place of birth: Oliveira do Hospital, Portugal
- Height: 1.78 m (5 ft 10 in)
- Position: Midfielder

Youth career
- 1997–2000: Tourizense
- 2000–2007: Sporting CP

Senior career*
Years	Team	Apps	(Gls)
2007–2009	Sporting CP	0	(0)
2007−2008	→ Olhanense (loan)	1	(0)
2008	→ Olivais Moscavide (loan)	9	(0)
2008−2009	→ Atlético (loan)	29	(9)
2009−2010	Gil Vicente	5	(0)
2010−2011	Vizela	21	(2)
2011−2012	Mafra	22	(1)
2012−2013	Naval	23	(4)
2013−2014	Académico Viseu	34	(3)
2014−2016	Penafiel	53	(7)
2016−2017	Académico Viseu	0	(0)
2017−2018	Mafra	0	(0)
Total		197	(26)

International career
2004	Portugal U16	3	(0)
2004−2005	Portugal U17	14	(0)
2006	Portugal U18	6	(2)
2006−2007	Portugal U19	13	(0)
2007−2008	Portugal U20	10	(1)
2008−2009	Portugal U21	4	(0)
- * Club domestic league appearances and goals

João Paulo Neto Martins (born 30 June 1988) is a Portuguese former professional footballer who played as a midfielder.

== Club career ==
Born in Oliveira do Hospital, Coimbra District, Martins played most of his youth football with Sporting CP, having arrived at the club's academy in 2000 at the age of 12. From 2007 to 2009 he was loaned to three teams, C.D. Olivais e Moscavide and Atlético Clube de Portugal in the third division and S.C. Olhanense in the second (one league match during the entire season for the latter side).

Released by Sporting in summer 2009, Martins resumed his career mainly in the third tier. He returned to division two in 2012–13, signing for Associação Naval 1º de Maio.

Martins joined second-division Académico de Viseu F.C. on 28 July 2013, on a one-year contract. He moved to the Primeira Liga in June 2014, agreeing to a two-year deal at recently-promoted F.C. Penafiel. He scored on his debut in the competition on 17 August, through a penalty, but in a 1−3 home loss against C.F. Os Belenenses; the campaign ended in immediate relegation, as last.

Martins retired in 2018 aged 30, following two injury-riddled seasons at Viseu and C.D. Mafra.

== International career ==
All youth levels comprised, Martins won 50 caps for Portugal and scored three goals. His first for the under-21 team arrived on 18 November 2008, when he played the last 25 minutes of the 4−1 friendly win over Spain in Cartaxo.

== Personal life ==
Martins' older brother, Carlos, was also a footballer and a midfielder. He also graduated from Sporting's youth system but with much more individual success, going on to also represent S.L. Benfica and Portugal.

After retiring, Martins worked in glamping and as a mental coach.
