= Chapinha =

Portuguese footballer

Personal information
- Full name: Paulo Roberto Oliveira Baptista
- Date of birth: 1 July 1992 (age 34)
- Place of birth: Santa Maria da Feira, Portugal
- Height: 1.72 m (5 ft 7 1/2 in)
- Position: Forward

Team information
- Current team: Anadia
- Number: 7

Youth career
- 2007–2011: Feirense

Senior career*
Years	Team	Apps	(Gls)
2011–2014	Feirense	16	(0)
2011–2013	→ São João de Ver (loan)	36	(0)
2014	→ Lusitânia Lourosa (loan)	16	(0)
2014–2015	Quarteirense	18	(2)
2015	União de Leiria	8	(0)
2015–2016	Sanjoanense	27	(6)
2016–	Anadia	25	(5)
- * Club domestic league appearances and goals as of 2 April 2017

Paulo Roberto Oliveira Baptista known as Chapinha (born 1 July 1992) is a Portuguese football player who plays for Anadia.

== Club career ==
He made his professional debut in the Segunda Liga for Feirense on 11 August 2013 in a game against Leixões.
