= Nikola Zugić =

Serbian footballer

Personal information
- Date of birth: 30 January 1990 (age 36)
- Place of birth: Belgrade, SR Serbia, SFR Yugoslavia
- Height: 1.87 m (6 ft 2 in)
- Position: Midfielder

Youth career
- 2001–2008: Quarteirense
- 2008–2009: Louletano

Senior career*
Years	Team	Apps	(Gls)
2009–2011	Louletano		
2011–2013	Quarteirense		
2013–2015	Farense	21	(0)
2015–2016	Santa Clara	7	(0)
2016–2017	Armacenenses	3	(0)
2017	Sant Julià	7	(0)
2017–2020	Engordany	35	(5)
2020–2023	Atlètic d'Escaldes	29	(2)
Total		102	(7)
- * Club domestic league appearances and goals

Nikola Zugić (born 30 January 1990) is a Serbian former professional footballer who played as a midfielder. He also holds Portuguese citizenship.

== Career ==
On 10 August 2013, Zugić made his professional debut with Farense in a 2013–14 Segunda Liga match against Portimonense replacing Neca (84th minute).
