= Barroca =

Portuguese footballer (born 1986)

Personal information
- Full name: João Gabriel Silva Ferreira
- Date of birth: 29 July 1986 (age 40)
- Place of birth: Mealhada, Portugal
- Height: 1.86 m (6 ft 1 in)
- Position: Goalkeeper

Youth career
- 1997–2000: Mealhada
- 2000–2005: Académica

Senior career*
Years	Team	Apps	(Gls)
2005–2006	Vigor Mocidade		
2006–2008	Tocha		
2008–2009	Tourizense	30	(0)
2009–2011	Académica	2	(0)
2009–2011	→ Tourizense (loan)	27	(0)
2011–2015	Servette	40	(0)
2013–2014	→ Lausanne-Sport (loan)	9	(0)
2015–2017	Lancy	38	(0)
2017–2018	Stade Nyonnais	36	(0)
2019	Meyrin	8	(0)
2019–2020	Stade Lausanne Ouchy	27	(0)
Total		217	(0)
- * Club domestic league appearances and goals

João Gabriel Silva Ferreira (born 29 July 1986 in Mealhada, Aveiro District), known as Barroca, is a Portuguese former professional footballer who played as a goalkeeper.
