= Bruno Amaro =

Portuguese footballer

Personal information
- Full name: Bruno Amaro Sousa Barros
- Date of birth: 17 February 1983 (age 43)
- Place of birth: Paço de Sousa, Portugal
- Height: 1.81 m (5 ft 11 in)
- Position: Midfielder

Youth career
- 1992–1993: Cetê
- 1993–1995: Parada Pinhão
- 1995–2002: Penafiel

Senior career*
Years	Team	Apps	(Gls)
2002–2006	Penafiel	76	(3)
2006–2011	Nacional	74	(8)
2009–2010	→ Académica (loan)	3	(1)
2011–2013	Vitória Setúbal	53	(3)
2013–2015	Arouca	44	(3)
2015	Felgueiras 1932	7	(0)
2016	Rebordosa	15	(0)
Total		272	(18)

International career
2002	Portugal U19	2	(0)
2005–2006	Portugal U21	2	(0)
2006	Portugal B	1	(1)
- * Club domestic league appearances and goals

Bruno Amaro Sousa Barros (born 17 February 1983), known as Amaro, is a Portuguese former professional footballer who played mainly as a central midfielder.

He amassed Primeira Liga totals of 216 matches and 18 goals over 11 seasons, representing mainly Nacional (four years).

== Club career ==
A product of hometown F.C. Penafiel's youth system, Amaro was born in the village of Paço de Sousa and spent five professional seasons with the club, three in the Segunda Liga and two in the Primeira Liga. He signed for C.D. Nacional in September 2006, still playing the first game of the campaign with his previous team; his official debut for the Madeirans came on the 9th, in a 0–1 home loss against Sporting CP.

Amaro finished his debut season in the top division with five goals in 25 appearances, but featured less significantly the following years. For 2009–10, he served a season-long loan at Académica de Coimbra; teammate Miguel Fidalgo also joined the side in a loan deal.

At only three goals, Amaro was crowned Vitória de Setúbal's top scorer in the 2011–12 campaign, notably scoring the game's only goal at home against Sporting as the team again narrowly avoided relegation.

On 4 July 2013, the 30-year-old Amaro joined fellow top-flight side F.C. Arouca on a two-year contract. On 18 August, in their first-ever match in the competition, he opened the score at Sporting, but the hosts eventually won 5–1.

== International career ==
On 26 January 2006, Amaro scored once to close a 4–1 win over Georgia in third-place playoff of the Vale do Tejo Tournament.
