= Daniel Materazzi =

Portuguese footballer (born 1985)

Personal information
- Full name: Daniel Jorge Barbosa Ramos
- Date of birth: 22 March 1985 (age 41)
- Place of birth: Gondomar, Portugal
- Height: 1.88 m (6 ft 2 in)
- Position: Centre back

Team information
- Current team: Leça

Youth career
- 1995–1998: Porto
- 2000–2004: Salgueiros

Senior career*
Years	Team	Apps	(Gls)
2004–2005	Rio Tinto		
2005–2006	Freamunde	0	(0)
2006–2007	Rebordosa		
2007–2009	Lusitânia Lourosa	49	(1)
2009–2011	Gondomar	57	(3)
2011–2013	Tondela	44	(3)
2013–2014	Leixões	35	(2)
2014–2015	Santa Clara	24	(1)
2015–2016	Olhanense	44	(1)
2016–2017	Fafe	29	(1)
2017–2018	Olhanense	28	(1)
2018	Lusitânia Lourosa	2	(0)
2018–2019	Leça	22	(2)
2019–2020	Trofense	18	(1)
2020–	Leça	29	(0)
- * Club domestic league appearances and goals as of 24 October 2021

Daniel Jorge Barbosa Ramos, known as Daniel Materazzi (born 22 March 1985) is a Portuguese footballer who plays as a defender for Leça FC.

A journeyman who never spent more than two senior years at the same club, he made 149 LigaPro appearances over five consecutive seasons, each with a different team. He spent most of his career in the third tier, playing over 200 times in service of six teams.

== Career ==
Born in Gondomar, Porto District, Materazzi played as a youth for FC Porto and S.C. Salgueiros. While at the latter, he received his nickname after Marco Materazzi, for his physical resemblance to the Italian international who played in the same position.

Having not broken into Salgueiros' team while the club was in the Segunda Liga, Materazzi dropped to the third tier, where he represented S.C. Freamunde, Rebordosa AC, Lusitânia FC, hometown club Gondomar S.C. and finally C.D. Tondela, whom he joined in 2011. In his first season with them, the club won promotion to the Segunda.

Materazzi remained in the second division, representing Leixões SC, C.D. Santa Clara, S.C. Olhanense and AD Fafe in one-year spells from 2013 to 2017. He left his two-year contract at Olhanense by mutual consent.

After leaving Fafe in 2017, Materazzi returned to Olhanense, now in the third-tier Campeonato de Portugal. He remained in the division, with Lusitânia again, Leça F.C. (two spells) and C.D. Trofense.
