= João Viana =

Portuguese footballer

Personal information
- Full name: João Nuno Duarte Viana
- Date of birth: 13 January 1992 (age 34)
- Place of birth: Maia, Portugal
- Height: 1.83 m (6 ft 0 in)
- Position: Right-back

Team information
- Current team: Stade Nyonnais

Youth career
- 2002–2003: Progresso
- 2003–2010: Boavista
- 2005–2006: → Pasteleira (loan)
- 2007–2008: → Pasteleira (loan)
- 2010–2011: Gondomar

Senior career*
Years	Team	Apps	(Gls)
2011–2013	Trofense	27	(0)
2012	→ Feirense (loan)	1	(0)
2013–2015	Leixões	32	(0)
2015	Trofense	7	(0)
2016–	Stade Nyonnais	10	(0)

International career
2012	Portugal U20	2	(0)
- * Club domestic league appearances and goals as of 15 January 2017

João Nuno Duarte Viana (born 13 January 1992) is a Portuguese professional footballer who plays for Swiss club FC Stade Nyonnais as a right-back.

== Career ==
Born in Maia, Porto District, Viana played for three clubs as a youth, including Boavista F.C. where he had several spells. In 2011–12 he made his senior debuts with C.D. Trofense, in the Segunda Liga.

Viana appeared in his first professional game on 7 August 2011, starting against F.C. Penafiel in the season's League Cup.
