= Fernando Ávalos (footballer) =

Argentine footballer (born 1978)

Personal information
- Full name: Fernando Horacio Ávalos
- Date of birth: 31 March 1978 (age 48)
- Place of birth: Posadas, Argentina
- Height: 1.82 m (6 ft 0 in)
- Position: Centre back

Youth career
- Boca Juniors

Senior career*
Years	Team	Apps	(Gls)
1997–1998	Nueva Chicago	37	(0)
1998–1999	Huracán	28	(0)
1999	Deportivo Español	14	(0)
2000	Corinthians	2	(0)
2001	Basel	0	(0)
2001–2003	Boavista	40	(0)
2003–2007	Nacional	132	(3)
2008	Duisburg	11	(0)
2009	Belenenses	15	(0)
2009–2010	Nea Salamina	22	(1)
2010–2011	Camacha	9	(2)
2011–2014	União Madeira	90	(8)
2014–2016	Bravos Maquis	41	(4)
Total		441	(18)
- * Club domestic league appearances and goals

Fernando Horacio Ávalos (born 31 March 1978) is an Argentine former footballer who played as a central defender.

He spent most of his professional career in Portugal, amassing Primeira Liga totals of 187 matches and three goals over the course of eight seasons, mainly in representation of Nacional (four years). He also had spells in five other countries, his own notwithstanding. Many people knew him as the captain of União da Madeira.

== Club career ==
Born in Posadas, Misiones Province, Ávalos started his professional career with Club Atlético Nueva Chicago then moved, in his country, to Club Atlético Huracán and Club Social, Deportivo y Cultural Español. His first abroad experience arrived in 2000, with Brazil's Sport Club Corinthians Paulista.

After splitting the 2000–01 season with Corinthians and FC Basel, Ávalos found stability in the Portuguese Primeira Liga, playing two years with Boavista F.C. and four and a half at Madeira's C.D. Nacional. He appeared in two UEFA Cup editions with the latter.

In January 2008, Ávalos moved to Germany with MSV Duisburg, not being able to help his new team prevent relegation from the Bundesliga. Released in December he returned to Portugal to sign with C.F. Os Belenenses, where he met the same fate; at the end of the campaign he moved to Cyprus, with Nea Salamis Famagusta FC.

Aged 32, Ávalos returned to Portugal and the Madeira island, signing with lowly A.D. Camacha. For 2011–12 he stayed in the region, joining second level's C.F. União and being a defensive stalwart for several years.

In January 2014, Ávalos moved clubs and countries again, penning a one-year contract with Angola's F.C. Bravos do Maquis.
