= Carlos Califo =

Bissau-Guinean footballer

Personal information
- Full name: Carlos Califo Seidi
- Date of birth: 22 September 1989 (age 37)
- Place of birth: Lisbon, Portugal
- Height: 1.80 m (5 ft 11 in)
- Position: Defender

Team information
- Current team: Sintrense
- Number: 19

Youth career
- 2006–2008: Oeiras

Senior career*
Years	Team	Apps	(Gls)
2008–2011	Oeiras		
2009–2010	→ Operário (loan)		
2011–2012	Penalva Castelo	26	(3)
2012–2013	Mirandela	20	(1)
2013–2014	Gil Vicente	0	(0)
2013–2014	→ UD Oliveirense (loan)	25	(0)
2014–2015	Farense	9	(0)
2015	Loures	5	(0)
2016	Torreense	1	(1)
2017–	Sintrense	2	(0)

International career^{‡}
2014	Guinea-Bissau	1	(0)
- * Club domestic league appearances and goals as of 2 April 2017 ‡ National team caps and goals as of 19 July 2014

Carlos Califo Seidi (born 22 September 1989) simply Califo, is a Portuguese-born Bissau-Guinean footballer who plays for Sintrense as a defender.

== Football career ==
On 4 August 2013, Califo made his professional debut with Oliveirense in a 2013–14 Taça da Liga match against Sporting Covilhã, when he started and played the full game. In the first match of the 2013–14 Segunda Liga season against Penafiel on the 11 August, he made his league debut.

Internationally, Califo made his senior début for Guinea Bissau on 19 July 2014.
