= Márcio Ramos =

Portuguese footballer

Personal information
- Full name: Márcio José Raposo Ramos
- Date of birth: 15 October 1980 (age 46)
- Place of birth: Lisbon, Portugal
- Height: 1.90 m (6 ft 3 in)
- Position: Goalkeeper

Youth career
- 1991–1993: Povoense
- 1993–1999: Sporting CP

Senior career*
Years	Team	Apps	(Gls)
1999–2001	Sporting CP B	30	(0)
1999–2000	→ Lourinhanense (loan)	28	(0)
2001–2003	Vizela	34	(0)
2003–2004	Portimonense	32	(0)
2004–2005	Varzim	2	(0)
2005–2007	Vizela	22	(0)
2007–2009	Estoril	38	(0)
2009–2010	Gil Vicente	30	(0)
2010–2011	Penafiel	29	(0)
2011–2012	Mafra	0	(0)
2012	Aves	0	(0)
2012–2014	Portimonense	60	(0)
Total		305	(0)
- * Club domestic league appearances and goals

Márcio José Raposo Ramos (born 15 October 1980 in Lisbon) is a Portuguese former professional footballer who played as a goalkeeper.
