= Kheireddine Zarabi =

Algerian footballer (born 1984)

Personal information
- Full name: Kheireddine Zarabi
- Date of birth: 18 July 1984 (age 42)
- Place of birth: Hussein Dey, Algeria
- Height: 1.87 m (6 ft 2 in)
- Position: Centre-back

Youth career
- 1994–1997: IRB Ouargla
- 1997–1999: NA Hussein Dey
- 1999–2002: RC Kouba

Senior career*
Years	Team	Apps	(Gls)
2002–2005	RC Kouba		
2005–2006	ES Sétif	13	(0)
2006–2007	CR Belouizdad		
2007–2008	Turun Palloseura	25	(0)
2009	Belenenses	6	(0)
2009–2010	Vitória Setúbal	19	(0)
2011	Leixões	12	(1)
2011–2013	Arouca	25	(2)
2013–2016	União Madeira	74	(4)
2016	Nîmes	2	(0)
2016	Nîmes B	2	(0)
2016–2020	Covilhã	90	(5)
2020–2021	Cova Piedade	13	(1)

International career
2005	Algeria U23	7	(0)
- * Club domestic league appearances and goals as of 8 March 2021

Kheireddine "Kiko" Zarabi (Arabic: خير الدين زرابي; born 18 July 1984) is an Algerian professional footballer who plays as a central defender.

== Club career ==
Born in Hussein Dey District, Algiers, Zarabi started his career at age 10 with IRB Ouargla. When he turned 13 his family returned to live in the capital, and he joined NA Hussein Dey first before leaving to RC Kouba two years later; he made his senior debut with the latter in 2002, remaining three seasons with the club.

In May 2005, Zarabi went on trial with French Ligue 2 side FC Lorient. However, nothing came of it, and he returned to his homeland where he successively represented ES Sétif and CR Belouizdad.

Zarabi signed a two-and-a-half-year contract with Finland's Turun Palloseura in late 2007. On 19 January 2009, he moved to Portugal where he would remain the following years, with C.F. Os Belenenses, Vitória de Setúbal, Leixões S.C. and F.C. Arouca, the first two teams in the Primeira Liga and the other in the second division.

In his second season with Arouca, Zarabi contributed 14 matches and two goals as the Aveiro District club reached the top flight for the first time in its history. A brief spell in the French Ligue 2 with Nîmes Olympique notwithstanding, he continued competing in the Portuguese second tier until his retirement, with C.F. União, S.C. Covilhã and C.D. Cova da Piedade.

== International career ==
During his time at Kouba, Zarabi was a regular member of the Algeria under-23 team and participated in various tournaments, most notably the 2005 Mediterranean Games.

== Personal life ==
Zarabi's father, Abdelaziz, was also a footballer and a full Algerian international. His older brother, Abderraouf, also a defender, also played with Hussein Dey and in Finland.
