= 2010–11 Segunda Divisão =

Segunda Divisão
- Season: 2010–11
- Champions: União da Madeira
- Promoted: União da Madeira; Atlético CP
- Relegated: 14 teams

The 2010–11 Segunda Divisão season was the 77th season of the competition and the 64th season of recognised third-tier football in Portugal.

== Overview ==
The league was contested by 48 teams in 3 divisions with Padroense FC, União da Madeira and Atlético CP winning the respective divisional competitions and the latter two teams gaining promotion to the Liga de Honra. The overall championship was won by União da Madeira.

== League standings ==
=== Segunda Divisão - Zona Norte ===
Pos	Team	Pld	W	D	L	GF	GA	GD	Pts	Qualification or relegation
1	União da Madeira (A)	30	20	7	3	53	18	+35	67	Qualification to championship play-offs
2	FC Tirsense	30	15	10	5	40	26	+14	55	
3	GD Chaves	30	13	12	5	34	21	+13	51	
4	AD Fafe	30	13	7	10	40	33	+7	46	
5	AD Lousada	33	13	7	13	46	40	+6	46	
6	Marítimo B	30	11	11	8	36	25	+11	44	
7	FC Vizela	30	10	13	7	36	29	+7	43	
8	Macedo Cavaleiros	30	11	10	9	34	29	+5	43	
9	AD Camacha	30	11	8	11	34	35	−1	41	
10	AD Oliveirense	30	11	8	11	31	37	−6	41	
11	Merelinense FC	30	11	7	12	31	32	−1	40	
12	GD Ribeirão	30	9	12	9	38	29	+9	39	
13	CF Caniçal (R)	30	9	6	15	32	42	−10	33	Relegation to Terceira Divisão
14	CF Andorinha (R)	30	7	7	16	30	55	−25	28	Relegation to Terceira Divisão
15	GD Bragança (R)	30	4	6	20	24	53	−29	18	Relegation to Terceira Divisão
16	AD Pontassolense (R)	30	2	9	19	20	55	−35	15	Relegation to Terceira Divisão

Rules for classification: 1) points; 2) goal difference; 3) number of goals scored.
(A) Advance to a further round; (R) Relegated

=== Segunda Divisão - Zona Centro ===
Pos	Team	Pld	W	D	L	GF	GA	GD	Pts	Qualification or relegation
1	Padroense FC (A)	30	16	8	6	44	29	+15	56	Qualification to championship play-offs
2	Boavista FC	30	16	8	6	46	25	+21	56	
3	CD Tondela	30	16	7	7	46	28	+18	55	
4	Gondomar SC	30	13	11	6	42	26	+16	50	
5	Sertanense FC	30	14	7	9	29	25	+4	49	
6	GD Tourizense	30	13	6	11	48	32	+16	45	
7	Sporting Espinho	30	11	10	9	33	26	+7	43	
8	SC Esmoriz	30	9	11	10	31	38	−7	38	
9	SC Coimbrões	30	11	7	12	38	40	−2	37 (Note: 3 points deducted?)	
10	Anadia FC	30	10	7	13	32	40	−8	37	
11	Aliados FC Lordelo	30	9	10	11	28	34	−6	37	
12	SC Pombal (R)	30	10	6	14	35	48	−13	36	Relegation to Terceira Divisão
13	FC Pampilhosa (R)	30	10	6	14	31	39	−8	36	Relegation to Terceira Divisão
14	União da Serra (R)	30	8	10	12	33	36	−3	34	Relegation to Terceira Divisão
15	FC Cesarense (R)	30	7	9	14	33	46	−13	30	Relegation to Terceira Divisão
16	Eléctrico FC (R)	30	2	7	21	19	56	−37	13	Relegation to Terceira Divisão

Rules for classification: 1) points; 2) goal difference; 3) number of goals scored.
(A) Advance to a further round; (R) Relegated

=== Segunda Divisão - Zona Sul ===
Pos	Team	Pld	W	D	L	GF	GA	GD	Pts	Qualification or relegation
1	Atlético CP (A)	30	18	10	2	49	25	+24	64	Qualification to championship play-offs
2	CD Mafra	30	15	10	5	60	37	+23	55	
3	SCU Torreense	30	16	6	8	36	27	+9	54	
4	CD Pinhalnovense	30	13	11	6	39	29	+10	50	
5	AD Carregado	30	14	5	11	47	40	+7	47	
6	Oriental Lisboa	30	12	10	8	42	35	+7	46	
7	Louletano DC	30	12	9	9	46	38	+8	45	
8	FC Madalena	30	12	8	10	32	28	+4	44	
9	Operário dos Açores	30	11	9	10	40	40	0	42	
10	Juventude de Évora	30	9	12	9	30	34	−4	39	
11	Atlético SC Reguengos	30	11	5	14	40	47	−7	38	
12	SC Farense (R)	30	8	12	10	28	37	−9	36	Relegation to Terceira Divisão
13	Casa Pia AC (R)	30	7	7	16	37	49	−12	28	Relegation to Terceira Divisão
14	Real SC (R)	30	5	10	15	27	40	−13	25	Relegation to Terceira Divisão
15	GD Lagoa (R)	30	5	5	20	19	38	−19	20	Relegation to Terceira Divisão
16	SC Praiense (R)	30	3	9	18	26	54	−28	18	Relegation to Terceira Divisão

Rules for classification: 1) points; 2) goal difference; 3) number of goals scored.
(A) Advance to a further round; (R) Relegated

== Play-offs ==
=== Play-off table ===
Pos	Team	Pld	W	D	L	GF	GA	GD	Pts	Promotion
1	União da Madeira (C, P)	4	2	1	1	5	2	+3	7	Promotion to Liga de Honra
2	Atlético CP (P)	4	2	0	2	3	6	−3	6	Promotion to Liga de Honra
3	Padroense FC	4	1	1	2	5	5	0	4	

Rules for classification: 1) points; 2) goal difference; 3) number of goals scored.
(C) Champions; (P) Promoted

==== Top goalscorers ====
Rank	Player	Club	Goals
1	(Portugal) Paulo Sérgio	Atlético CP	2
1	(Brazil) Marcão	Padroense FC	2
1	(São Tomé and Príncipe) Santiago Silva	Padroense FC	2
4	(Angola) Rudy	Atlético CP	1
4	(Portugal) André Simões	Padroense FC	1
4	(Senegal) Mbaye Diop	União da Madeira	1
4	(Portugal) Rúben Andrade	União da Madeira	1
4	(Brazil) Gleibson	União da Madeira	1
4	(Portugal) Bertinho	União da Madeira	1
4	(Portugal) Tony Figueira	União da Madeira	1
