= Djibril Zidnaba =

Burkinabé footballer (born 1994)

Personal information
- Full name: Ben Amed Djibril Zidnaba
- Date of birth: 20 February 1994 (age 32)
- Place of birth: Ouagadougou, Burkina Faso
- Height: 1.84 m (6 ft 0 in)
- Position: Defensive midfielder

Team information
- Current team: Benfica e Castelo Branco
- Number: 88

Youth career
- EFO

Senior career*
Years	Team	Apps	(Gls)
2012–2013	EFO		
2013	Naval	18	(1)
2013–2015	Braga B	38	(3)
2015	→ Moreirense (loan)	4	(0)
2015–2017	Penafiel	59	(2)
2017–2018	Sertanense	26	(0)
2018–2019	Trofense	22	(0)
2019–	Benfica e Castelo Branco	9	(0)
- * Club domestic league appearances and goals as of 22:01, 11 November 2019 (UTC)

Ben Amed Djibril Zidnaba (born 20 February 1994 in Ouagadougou) is a Burkinaby footballer who last played for Sport Benfica e Castelo Branco, as a defensive midfielder.

== Career ==
In January 2013, Zidnaba signed for Associação Naval 1º de Maio.
