= Campo Adelino Rodrigues =

Multi-use stadium on the Portuguese island of Madeira

- Campo do Liceu
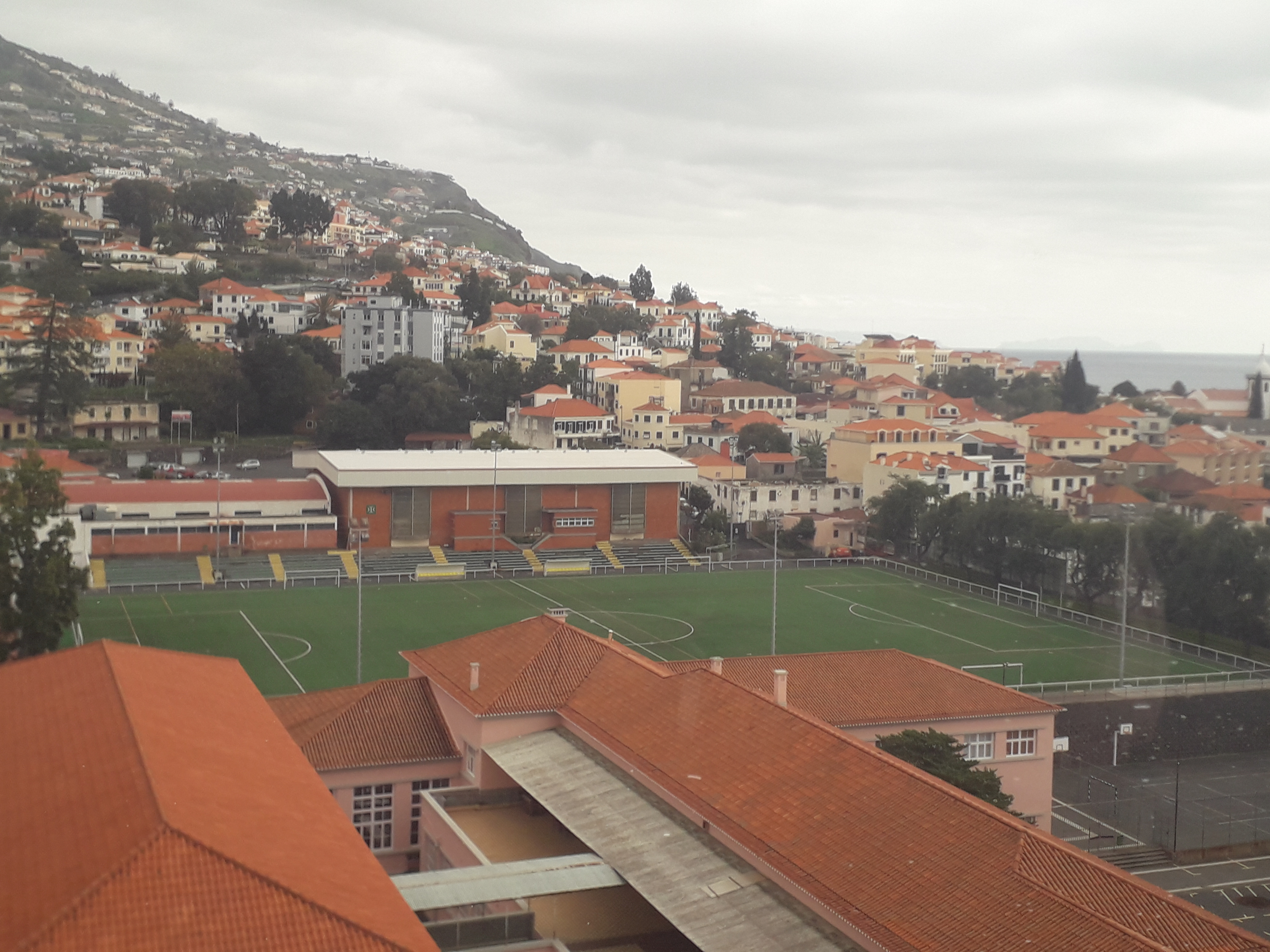
- Interactive map of Campo Adelino Rodrigues
- Location: Funchal, Madeira
- Coordinates: 32.64930315978741°N 16.90026572350384°W
- Capacity: 2,000

Campo de Futebol Adelino Rodrigues, also known as Campo do Liceu, is a multi-use stadium, mainly used for football, which is located in the city centre of Funchal, on the Portuguese island of Madeira. The stadium is the current home of União da Bola.

The stadium, which has a capacity for approximately 2,000 people in stands placed on three sides of the pitch, is mainly used by local football teams such as CS Madeira and by the University of Madeira teams. Until 2003, the pitch was made up of earth and clay, before it was revamped and laid with a synthetic astroturf surface.

From October 2008 to June 2011, the stadium was also used for the home games of C.F. União, having moved from their previous home at the Estádio dos Barreiros. However, after their promotion to the Liga de Honra in 2011, União shared Barreiros once again, as the Campo do Liceu couldn't meet the league's criteria. In December 2019, União returned to Campo do Liceu, as they were relegated from Segunda Liga in 2018.

The ground was the temporary home of Marítimo and Nacional from 1954 until 1957 during the reconstruction of the Estádio dos Barreiros.
