= Pedro Santos (footballer, born 1983) =

Portuguese footballer

Personal information
- Full name: Pedro Miguel Fonte Boa Santos
- Date of birth: 9 July 1983 (age 43)
- Place of birth: Póvoa de Varzim, Portugal
- Height: 1.78 m (5 ft 10 in)
- Position: Centre-back

Youth career
- 1995–2002: Varzim

Senior career*
Years	Team	Apps	(Gls)
2002–2011	Varzim	161	(8)
2002–2003	→ Cerveira (loan)		
2011–2012	Trofense	23	(2)
2012–2014	Penafiel	46	(1)
2014–2015	Académico Viseu	15	(0)
2015–2017	Varzim	31	(1)
2017	Salgueiros	7	(0)
2018	Sanjoanense	9	(1)
2018–2019	Mirandela	14	(0)
2020–2021	Neves	3	(0)
Total		309	(13)
- * Club domestic league appearances and goals

Pedro Miguel Fonte Boa Santos (born 9 July 1983 in Póvoa de Varzim) is a Portuguese former professional footballer who played as a central defender.
