= Diogo Ribeiro (footballer) =

Portuguese footballer (born 1991)

Personal information
- Full name: Diogo de Sousa Ribeiro
- Date of birth: 14 January 1991 (age 35)
- Place of birth: Coimbra, Portugal
- Height: 1.83 m (6 ft 0 in)
- Position: Forward

Team information
- Current team: Beira-Mar
- Number: 66

Youth career
- 1999–2002: Esperança Coimbra
- 2002–2008: Sporting CP
- 2008–2010: Académica

Senior career*
Years	Team	Apps	(Gls)
2010–2011	Académica	0	(0)
2010–2011	→ Tourizense (loan)	28	(6)
2011–2012	Sertanense	30	(14)
2012–2014	Braga B	47	(11)
2013	→ Aves (loan)	14	(3)
2014	Lechia Gdańsk	0	(0)
2014	Melfi	0	(0)
2015–2016	Belenenses	1	(0)
2015	→ Mafra (loan)	12	(1)
2016	→ Covilhã (loan)	21	(4)
2016–2017	Santa Clara	19	(0)
2017–2019	Académica	35	(3)
2019–2021	Vizela	45	(23)
2021–2022	Alverca	18	(2)
2022–2023	Académica	26	(4)
2023–2024	Dumiense	13	(2)
2024	Oliveira do Hospital	13	(2)
2024–	Beira-Mar		

International career
2006–2007	Portugal U16	5	(0)
2008–2009	Portugal U18	6	(1)
2010	Portugal U20	1	(0)
- * Club domestic league appearances and goals as of 6 January 2025

Diogo de Sousa Ribeiro (born 14 January 1991) is a Portuguese professional footballer who plays as a forward for Campeonato de Portugal club Beira-Mar.

== Club career ==
Born in Coimbra, Ribeiro finished his development at local Associação Académica, but did not represent the club officially in his first spell. In the 2011–12 season he shone for Sertanense F.C. in the third division, scoring 16 goals in 32 matches and subsequently securing a contract with S.C. Braga.

Ribeiro only represented the B team during his two-year spell in Minho, also being loaned to Segunda Liga side C.D. Aves in January 2013. On 21 June 2014, he signed a one-year deal with Polish Ekstraklasa club Lechia Gdańsk, and shortly after joined Italian side Melfi, before returning to his country after only a few months to sign with C.F. Os Belenenses. He made his debut in the Primeira Liga on 7 March 2015, coming on as a late substitute in a 1–1 away draw against Vitória de Setúbal.

In the summer of 2015, Ribeiro was loaned for one season to second-tier club C.D. Mafra. The following January, in the same situation, he moved to S.C. Covilhã in the same league.

On 5 January 2024, Ribeiro joined Liga 3 club Oliveira do Hospital.
