= Rachide Forbes =

Bissau-Guinean footballer (born 1989)

Forbes
Personal information
- Full name: Rachide Forbes Vandinho Barreto
- Date of birth: 20 June 1989 (age 37)
- Place of birth: Mansôa, Guinea-Bissau
- Height: 1.84 m (6 ft 0 in)
- Position: Forward

Team information
- Current team: Salgueiros
- Number: 29

Youth career
- 2007–2008: Braga

Senior career*
| Years | Team | Apps | (Gls) |
| 2008–2009 | Braga | 0 | (0) |
| 2008–2009 | → Ribeirão (loan) | 13 | (2) |
| 2009–2011 | Ribeirão | 36 | (11) |
| 2011 | Varzim | 7 | (0) |
| 2011–2012 | Ribeirão | 10 | (0) |
| 2012–2013 | Operário | 38 | (14) |
| 2013–2014 | Covilhã | 31 | (11) |
| 2014–2017 | Vitória Setúbal | 8 | (0) |
| 2015–2016 | → Académico de Viseu (loan) | 27 | (6) |
| 2016–2017 | → Anadia (loan) | 8 | (4) |
| 2017– | Salgueiros | 4 | (0) |
- * Club domestic league appearances and goals as of 2 April 2017

Rachide Forbes Vandinho Barreto (born 20 June 1989), known as Forbes, is a Bissau-Guinean professional footballer who plays for Salgueiros as a forward.

== Career ==
Forbes signed for Sporting de Covilhã on 21 June 2013, and scored his first goal on 14 August 2013 against Feirense.

== Personal life ==
His uncle Forbs played 11 seasons in the Primeira Liga.
