= Jorge Gonçalves =

Portuguese footballer (born 1983)

Personal information
- Full name: Jorge Miguel Dias Gonçalves
- Date of birth: 31 October 1983 (age 42)
- Place of birth: Pedroso, Portugal
- Height: 1.78 m (5 ft 10 in)
- Position: Winger

Youth career
- 1993–1995: AD Pedroso
- 1995–1998: Porto
- 1998–2002: Leixões

Senior career*
Years	Team	Apps	(Gls)
2001	Leixões	2	(0)
2002–2003	Avanca		
2003–2004	Pedras Rubras	36	(12)
2004–2008	Leixões	115	(20)
2008–2010	Racing Santander	10	(0)
2009–2010	→ Vitória Guimarães (loan)	17	(0)
2010–2011	Olhanense	29	(0)
2011–2012	Vitória Setúbal	21	(1)
2012–2014	Feirense	74	(20)
2014–2015	Atlético	28	(2)
2015–2016	Felgueiras 1932	16	(5)
2016	Fafe	16	(6)
2016–2017	Salgueiros	25	(5)
2017–2019	Valadares Gaia	66	(9)
Total		455	(80)
- * Club domestic league appearances and goals

Jorge Miguel Dias Gonçalves (born 31 October 1983) is a Portuguese former professional footballer who played as a right winger.

He appeared in 98 Primeira Liga games over five seasons, scoring a total of eight goals for Leixões, Vitória de Guimarães, Olhanense and Vitória de Setúbal. He added 186 matches and 35 goals in the Segunda Liga, and also competed in Spain.

== Club career ==
Gonçalves was born in Pedroso, Vila Nova de Gaia. After finishing his youth career with Leixões SC, he went on to have stints with modest clubs before returning to Matosinhos in 2004. He would be a very important attacking player from the beginning, helping to promotion from the Segunda Liga into the Primeira Liga at the end of the 2006–07 season by contributing 26 games and five goals.

In 2007–08, Gonçalves scored seven league goals for Leixões – a squad-best – as the team avoided relegation in the last matchday. On 1 September 2008, the last day of the summer transfer window, he signed a four-year contract with La Liga side Racing de Santander for €1 million, being rarely used throughout the campaign.

Gonçalves returned to Portugal in June 2009, being loaned to Vitória S.C. in a season-long move. He was irregularly used as the Minho club finished in sixth position, failing to find the net in 21 competitive matches; he was subsequently released by Racing but stayed in his country, joining S.C. Olhanense.

After one final campaign in the top flight with Vitória de Setúbal, Gonçalves returned to the second tier, where he represented C.D. Feirense and Atlético Clube de Portugal. From 2015 onwards, he competed solely in his country's lower leagues.

== Honours ==
Leixões

- Segunda Liga: 2006–07
