= Mutaro Embalo =

Guinea-Bissauan footballer (born 1992)

Bata
Personal information
- Full name: Mutaro Embaló
- Date of birth: 12 December 1992 (age 33)
- Place of birth: Bissau, Guinea-Bissau
- Height: 1.83 m (6 ft 0 in)
- Position: Forward

Senior career*
| Years | Team | Apps | (Gls) |
| 2012–2013 | Alcanenense | 13 | (1) |
| 2013–2014 | Sporting Covilhã | 37 | (6) |
| 2014–2015 | Nacional | 0 | (0) |
| 2014 | → Portimonense (loan) | 8 | (1) |
| 2015 | → Atlético CP (loan) | 16 | (1) |
| 2015–2016 | Penafiel | 24 | (0) |
| 2016 | UD Oliveirense | 3 | (1) |
| 2016–2017 | Operário | 20 | (4) |
| 2017 | Alcanenense | 12 | (0) |
| 2018 | Sertanense | 8 | (1) |
| 2018–2019 | Oriental | 7 | (0) |
| 2019 | Vitória de Sernache | 11 | (0) |

International career
| 2014 | Guinea-Bissau | 3 | (0) |
- * Club domestic league appearances and goals

Mutaro Embaló (born 12 December 1992), known as Bata, is a Guinea-Bissauan former professional footballer who played as a forward.
