= C.F. União =

Association football club in Madeira, Portugal

Coordinates: 32°41′25.130″N 17°2′56.558″W

União da Madeira
- Full name: Clube de Futebol União
- Nicknames: União da Bola (Union of the ball); Unionistas (Unionists)
- Founded: 1 November 1913; 112 years ago (as União Futebol Clube)
- Dissolved: 23 November 2021; 4 years ago
- Ground: Campo do Adelino Rodrigues, Funchal
- Capacity: 3,000
Home colours	Away colours

Clube de Futebol União, commonly known as União da Madeira, was a Portuguese football club based in Funchal, Madeira, notable for its six seasons in the Portuguese top-flight Primeira Liga, between the 1989–90 and 1991–92 seasons, the 1993–94 and 1994–95 seasons and most recently in the 2015–16 season.

The club was originally founded on 1 November 1913, thus being one of the oldest football clubs in Portugal, and maintained a strong local rivalry with neighbours Marítimo and Nacional da Madeira throughout much of its history. After building mounting debts, and failing to fulfil consecutive matches leading to disqualification from competing in the Campeonato de Portugal – the country's fourth-tier league – União da Madeira were forcibly dissolved on 23 November 2021.

As a sports club, União da Madeira had sports departments for Basketball, Fencing, Football, handball, Roller Hockey, Rugby and Volleyball. The professional football team were notably sponsored by the Museu CR7, the local museum dedicated to Cristiano Ronaldo, who was born in Funchal.

A new phoenix club, União da Bola Futebol Clube was founded in 2022, with the aim of "honouring the legacy" of the demised club. The club entered a senior football team into the 1ª Divisão of the Madeira Football Association.

== History ==
The club was founded on 1 November 1913 initially as União Futebol Clube by, among others, César da Silva, João Fernandes Rosa, Alexandre Vasconcelos, José Anastácio do Nascimento and José Fernandes. The founding members shortly after its establishment decided to change the club's name to Clube de Futebol União in 1916.

Shortly after Ângelo Olim Marote was appointed as the very first chairman of the club. A few years later the club was a founding member of the Madeira Football Association which it is still a part of today as well as competing in its annual AF Madeira Cup.

União won the third-tier championship in 2010–11, thereby returning to the professional leagues after seven years away. In 2014–15, managed by promotion specialist Vítor Oliveira, the club came runners-up in Segunda Liga behind C.D. Tondela and reached the Primeira Liga for the first time in two decades.

The club's spell in the top flight lasted only one season, and União were relegated in 2016. Two years later, they fell into the third tier again, with two games left to play of the season. In 2020–21, the club and fellow Madeirans A.D. Camacha and CSD Câmara de Lobos withdrew at the halfway point due to COVID-19 travel restrictions, but were not relegated. União da Madeira were forcibly dissolved and the club officially closed on 23 November 2021.

== Stadium ==
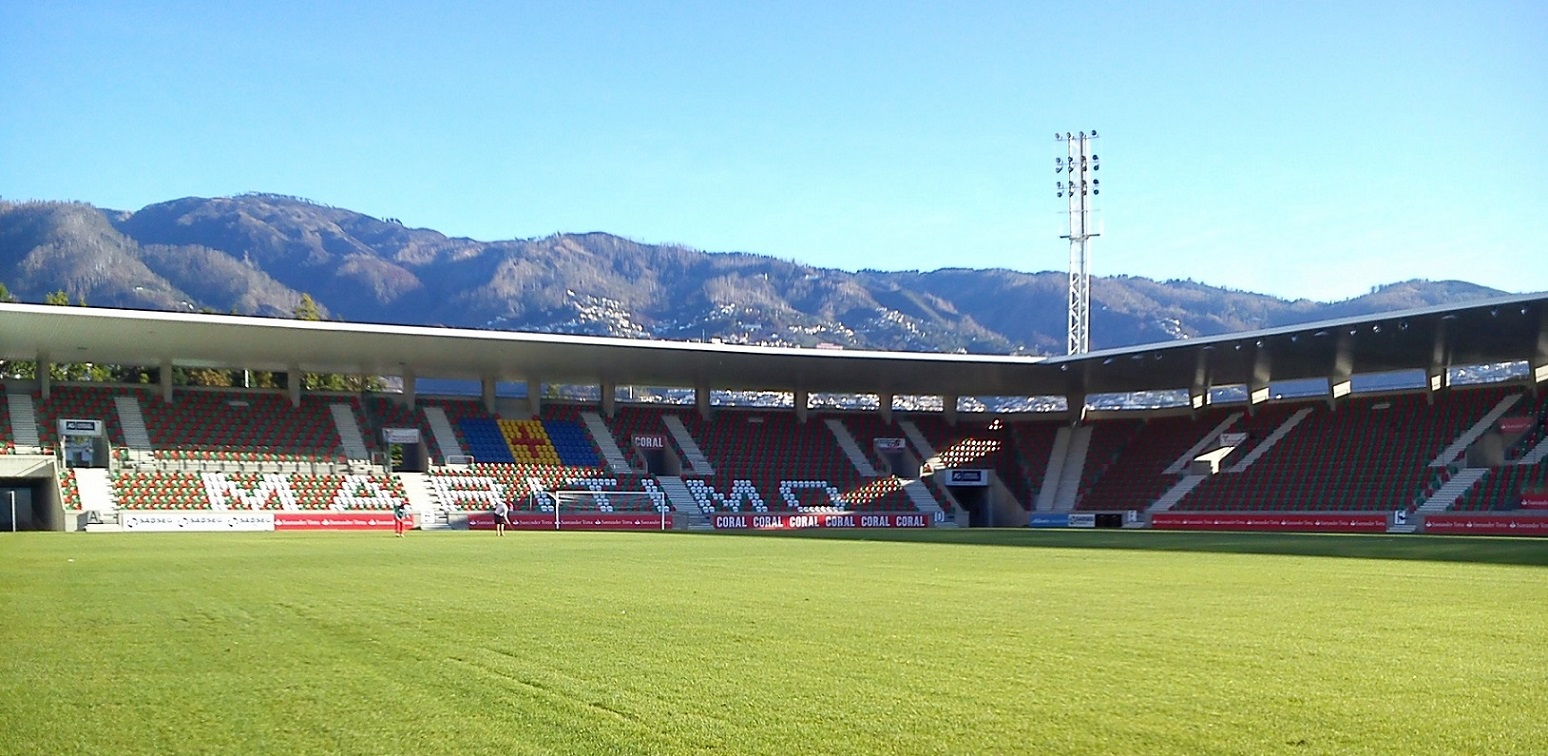
Since leaving the Estádio dos Barreiros in 2008, União played at a variety of home grounds

União's most recent home ground was the Campo do Adelino Rodrigues. The club led a nomadic existence since leaving the Estádio dos Barreiros in 2008 when the stadium was purchased by joint tenants and local rivals Marítimo from the local municipality.

They played at the Campo do Adelino Rodrigues for a short period before winning promotion back to the Segunda Liga in 2011 rendered that stadium as inadequate. União returned to Barreiros for the 2011–12 season before relocating to the 3,300-capacity municipal stadium in Machico for the 2012–13 campaign and then again to the Centro Desportivo da Madeira at Ribeira Brava in 2014. Whilst remaining at the modest 2,500-seat venue after winning promotion to the Primeira Liga in 2015, the club had an agreement with top division rivals Nacional to play its high-profile home games at their larger stadium, the Estádio da Madeira. The stadium previously hosted several cup matches. In 2018, União were relegated from the Segunda Liga and in December 2018, they returned to Campo do Adelino Rodrigues.

== Current squad ==
Updated 27 September 2017

Note: Flags indicate national team as defined under FIFA eligibility rules; some limited exceptions apply. Players may hold more than one non-FIFA nationality.

No.	Pos.	Nation	Player
1	GK	POR	Edgar Mendonça
3	DF	CGO	Dorvel Dibékou
6	MF	BDI	Christophe Nduwarugira (on loan from Chibuto)
7	FW	BRA	Danilo Dias
8	MF	SEN	Pathé Ciss
9	FW	GNB	Flávio
10	MF	POR	Mica
11	FW	POR	Betinho
13	DF	SEN	Alhassane Sylla
15	DF	CIV	Romaric
17	FW	CPV	Júnior
19	MF	SEN	Nestor Mendy
20	DF	POR	Tiago Moreira
22	MF	BRA	Bruno Morais
24	DF	CPV	Tiago Almeida

No.	Pos.	Nation	Player
30	DF	POR	Nuno Lopes
33	DF	POR	Paulo Vasconcelos
44	DF	POR	Miguel Lourenço
52	MF	CPV	Rudy
70	FW	BRA	Moicano
72	FW	BRA	Rodrigo Henrique
77	MF	POR	André Carvalhas
83	DF	BRA	Rafael Donato
91	FW	NGA	Bolaji Oyetii
93	DF	BRA	Laércio
94	GK	BRA	Raví
98	MF	BRA	Peterson
99	GK	VEN	Mário Pellicer

== Honours ==
=== National ===
- Portuguese Second Division: 3
  - 1988–89, 2001–02, 2010–11

=== Regional ===
- AF Madeira Championship (tier 4): 16
  - 1920–21, 1927–28, 1931–32, 1933–34, 1937–38, 1956–57, 1958–59, 1959–60, 1960–61, 1961–62, 1962–63, 1963–64, 1964–65, 1973–74, 1977–78, 1979–80
- AF Madeira Cup: 17
  - 1945–46, 1956–57, 1957–58, 1960–61, 1961–62, 1962–63, 1963–64, 1964–65, 1982–83, 1983–84, 1986–87, 1987–88, 1988–89, 1992–93, 1994–95, 2002–03, 2004–05

== Managerial history ==
- Victor Stansel (1927–28)
- (Portugal) Niculau Rodriguez (1940–41)
- (Portugal) Medina (1950–51)
- (Portugal) Ruperto Garcia (1958–59)
- (Portugal) Serafim Neves (1961–62)
- (Portugal) Lourenço (1973–74)
- (Portugal) Quim Teixeira (1974–75)
- (Portugal) Rosário (1977–78)
- (Portugal) Fernando Casaca (1980–82)
- (Portugal) Miguel Diogo (1982–83)
- (Czechoslovakia) Alexander Horváth (1984–85)
- (Portugal) Mário Morais (1985)
- (Portugal) Mourinho Félix (1985–86)
- (Portugal) Carlos Cardoso (1986–87)
- (Portugal) Rui Mâncio (1987–93)
- (Brazil) Ernesto Paulo (1993–97)
- (Portugal) Vítor Urbano (1997–98)
- (Portugal) Jorge Jesus (1998)
- (Portugal) Fernando Festas (1998–99)
- (Portugal) Rui Mâncio (1999)
- (Portugal) Eduardo Luís (1999)
- (Portugal) Manuel Balela (1999–00)
- (Portugal) Vítor Urbano (2000–01)
- (Portugal) Manuel Balela (2001–02)
- (Portugal) Horácio Gonçalves (2002–03)
- (Portugal) Vitor Manuel (2003–04)
- (Portugal) Bruno Cardoso (2004)
- (Brazil) Ernesto Paulo (2004–06)
- (Portugal) José Rachão (2006)
- (Portugal) Bruno Cardoso (2006–07)
- (Portugal) Carlos Condeço (2007–08)
- (Brazil) Edson Porto (2008–09)
- (Portugal) Daniel Quintal (2009–10)
- (Portugal) Daniel Ramos (2010–11)
- (Portugal) João Abel (2011)
- (Serbia) Predrag Jokanović (2011–13)
- (Portugal) José Barros (2013–14)
- (Portugal) Mário Nunes (2014)
- (Portugal) Rui Mâncio (2014)
- (Portugal) Vítor Oliveira (2014–15)
- (Portugal) Norton de Matos (2015–16)
- (Portugal) Filó (2016)
- (Portugal) José Viterbo (2017)
- (Portugal) Jorge Casquilha (2017)
- (Portugal) Paulo Alves (2017)
- (Portugal) José Viterbo (2017–18)
- (Portugal) Ricardo Chéu (2018)
- (Portugal) Nuno Pinto Gomes (2018–19)
- (Portugal) Marco Camacho (2019)
- (Portugal) Fábio Pereira (2019–)

== Chairmen history ==
- Ângelo Olim Marote (1913–14)
- Simeão Vieira (1914–15)
- Luís Inácio Ferreira (1915–16)
- Luis da Costa (1916–19)
- José Julião de Freitas (1919–21)
- Luís Inácio Ferreira (1921–22)
- Alferes Couto Vaz (1922–24)
- Elmano Augusto Vieira (1924–27)
- Luís Inácio Ferreira (1927–28)
- Alferes Filipe de Freitas (1928–29)
- Ernesto Acciaioly (1929–30)
- Juvenal de Carvalho (1930–31)
- Alvaro Castro Fagundes (1931–32)
- Agostinho Dias (1932–33)
- José da Silva Coelho (1933–35)
- Raul Simões Dias Paquete (1935–36)
- Carlos Passos Pestana (1936–38)
- Luís Sequeira (1938–39)
- César Augusto Pestana (1939–41)
- Leonel Silva (1941–43)
- José da Silva (1943–44)
- Elmano Augusto Vieira (1944–45)
- Luis da Costa (1945–46)
- Francisco Parente (1946–47)
- Abel Correia (1947–52)
- Mateus da Silva (1952–54)
- João Nepomuceno (1954–55)
- Vasco Andrade (1955–56)
- Luis Sotero Gomes (1956–58)
- Mateus da Silva (1958–59)
- Luis Sotero Gomes (1959–61)
- Leonel de Mendonça (1961–63)
- Mateus da Silva (1963–64)
- Mateus da Silva (1965–66)
- Luis Sotero Gomes (1966–67)
- João Edmundo Faria (1967–68)
- Rui Firmino Neponuceno (1972–74)
- Luis Sotero Gomes (1974–75)
- Jaime Ernesto Ramos (1975–76)
- Ramiro dos Santos Lopes (1983–84)
- Jaime Ernesto Ramos (1986–00)
- Roberto Marote (2002–10)
- Jaime Lucas (2010–)

== League and cup history ==
Season	League									Cup	League Cup	Notes
Season	Tier	Pos	Pld	W	D	L	GF	GA	Pts	Cup	League Cup	Notes
1988–89	2	↑ 1	34	20	9	5	54	22	49	Round 1		Promoted
1989–90	1	16	34	5	14	15	24	45	24	Round 6		
1990–91	1	12	38	9	15	14	30	51	33	Round 5		
1991–92	1	↓ 18	34	9	6	19	30	58	24	Round 5		Relegated
1992–93	2	↑ 2	34	18	11	5	60	34	47	Round 5		Promoted
1993–94	1	12	34	11	9	14	36	42	31	Round 5		
1994–95	1	↓ 16	34	7	10	17	30	54	24	Round 4		Relegated
1995–96	2	7	34	14	9	11	43	37	51	Round 4		
1996–97	2	11	34	11	10	13	40	45	43	Round 5		
1997–98	2	12	34	11	8	15	36	48	41	Round 3		
1998–99	2	↓ 17	34	8	9	17	34	50	33	Round 3		Relegated
1999–00	3	3	38	21	9	8	65	37	72	Round 4		
2000–01	3	2	38	18	9	11	46	37	63	Round 2		
2001–02	3	↑ 1	38	24	9	5	69	24	81	Round 3		Promoted
2002–03	2	15	34	10	10	14	31	18	40	Round 4		
2003–04	2	↓ 18	34	4	15	15	39	53	27	Round 4		Relegated
2004–05	3	3	38	18	9	11	46	37	63	Round 3		
2005–06	3	2	26	13	6	7	45	22	45	Round 2		
2006–07	3	1	26	17	3	6	53	21	54	Round 4		^{[A]}
2007–08	3	1	26	15	6	5	43	17	51	Round 2		^{[A]}
2008–09	3	2	22	14	5	3	38	15	47	Round 4		
2009–10	3	1	30	23	5	2	70	25	74	Round 4		^{[A]}
2010–11	3	↑ 1	30	20	7	3	53	18	67	Round 5		Promoted
2011–12	2	10	30	9	10	11	35	40	37	Round 2	Round 2	
2012–13	2	10	42	13	17	12	47	46	56	Round 3	Round 2	
2013–14	2	13	42	14	10	18	50	46	52	Round 2	Round 1	
2014–15	2	↑ 2	46	22	14	10	69	39	80	Round 2	Round 3	Promoted
2015–16	1	↓ 17	34	7	8	19	27	50	29	Round 4	Round 2	Relegated
2016–17	2	3	42	17	13	12	52	43	64	Round 3	Round 2	
2017–18	2	↓ 17	38	12	8	18	44	53	44	Round 5	Round 3	Relegated
2018–19	3	11	34	12	8	14	28	32	44	Round 4		
2019–20	3	-	34	-	-	-	-	-	-	Round 2		

A. ^A Reached the playoffs.

Last updated: 15 January 2020
