= 2013–14 Taça de Portugal =

Tournament details
- Country: Portugal
- Teams: 156

Final positions
- Champions: Benfica (25th title)
- Runners-up: Rio Ave

Tournament statistics
- Matches played: 157
- Goals scored: 490 (3.12 per match)
- Top goal scorer: Júlio Rebelo (5 goals)

The 2013–14 Taça de Portugal was the 74th season of the Taça de Portugal, the premier Portuguese football knockout cup competition organised by the Portuguese Football Federation (FPF). It was contested by 156 teams from the top four tiers of Portuguese football. The competition began with the first-round matches in September 2013 and concluded with the final at the Estádio Nacional in Oeiras, on 18 May 2014.

The title holders were Primeira Liga side Vitória de Guimarães who entered the 2013–14 competition in the third round, together with the Primeira Liga teams, advancing as far as the next round, where they lost 2–0 to Porto.

In the final, Benfica defeated Rio Ave 1–0, courtesy of a first-half goal by Nicolás Gaitán, and won the competition for a record 25th time. In doing so, they also established a new Portuguese record of doubles (10) and became the first club to win the domestic treble of Primeira Liga, Taça de Portugal and Taça da Liga.

As the winners of the Taça de Portugal, Benfica earned the right to play in the 2014–15 UEFA Europa League group stage. However, since they had already qualified for the 2014–15 UEFA Champions League as the 2013–14 Primeira Liga winners, Rio Ave took their place as the cup runners-up. As they did not win the Taça de Portugal, Rio Ave had to enter the competition in the third qualifying round. In addition, Benfica qualified for the 2014 Supertaça Cândido de Oliveira, where they faced again Rio Ave, as a result of having won both league and cup titles.

== Format ==
As in the previous season, the competition format was organized in a knockout system consisting of seven rounds preceding the final match. The 79 teams competing in the newly formed Campeonato Nacional de Seniores (third tier), the 26 best relegated teams from the 2012–13 Third Division (extinct fourth tier) and the 18 champions of the District cups will enter the first round, with 35 of those teams receiving a bye. In the second round, Segunda Liga teams will join the first-round winners and the remaining teams that received a bye in the previous round. The second-round winners will advance to the third round, where they will meet the top tier Primeira Liga teams for the first time. Unlike the previous rounds, which are contested as one-legged fixtures, the semi-finals were played over two legs in a home-and-away basis. The final will be played at a neutral venue, the Estádio Nacional in Oeiras.

Round	Teams remaining	Teams involved	Winners from previous round	New entries this round	Leagues entering this round
First round	156	88	none	88	Campeonato Nacional de Seniores; Portuguese District Football Associations
Second round	112	96	44	52	Segunda Liga
Third round	64	64	48	16	Primeira Liga
Fourth round	32	32	32	none	none
Fifth round	16	16	16	none	none
Quarter-finals	8	8	8	none	none
Semi-finals	4	4	4	none	none
Final	2	2	2	none	none

== Teams ==
A total of 156 teams competing in the top four tiers of the Portuguese football were considered eligible by FPF to participate in the competition:

Primeira Liga (16 teams)

- Académica de Coimbra
- Arouca
- Belenenses
- Benfica
- Estoril
- Gil Vicente
- Marítimo
- Nacional
- Olhanense
- Paços de Ferreira
- Porto
- Rio Ave
- Sporting CP
- Braga
- Vitória de Guimarães
- Vitória de Setúbal

Segunda Liga (17 teams)

- Académico de Viseu
- Atlético
- Beira-Mar
- Chaves
- Desportivo das Aves
- Farense
- Feirense
- Leixões
- Moreirense
- Oliveirense
- Penafiel
- Portimonense
- Santa Clara
- Sporting da Covilhã
- Tondela
- Trofense
- União da Madeira

Campeonato Nacional de Seniores (79 teams)

Series A (10 teams)

- Bragança
- Fafe
- Limianos
- Mirandela
- Ninense
- Pedras Salgadas
- Santa Maria
- Valenciano
- Vianense
- Vilaverdense

Series B (9 teams) (Note: Vitória de Guimarães B, a reserve team which plays in the Series B, is ineligible to play in the competition.)

- Famalicão
- Felgueiras 1932
- Joane
- Lixa
- Oliveirense
- Ribeirão
- Tirsense
- Varzim
- Vizela

Series C (10 teams)

- Amarante
- Boavista
- Camacha
- Coimbrões
- Freamunde
- Gondomar
- Perafita
- Salgueiros 08
- Sousense
- Vila Flor

Series D (10 teams)

- Anadia
- Bustelo
- Cesarense
- Cinfães
- Estarreja
- Grijó
- Lusitânia Lourosa
- Lusitano FCV
- São João de Ver
- Sporting de Espinho

Series E (10 teams)

- Águias do Moradal
- Benfica Castelo Branco
- Carapinheirense
- Manteigas
- Naval
- Nogueirense
- Pampilhosa
- Sertanense
- Sourense
- Tourizense

Series F (10 teams)

- Alcanenense
- Atlético Riachense
- Caldas
- Carregado
- Fátima
- Lourinhanense
- Mafra
- Portomosense
- Torreense
- União de Leiria

Series G (10 teams)

- 1º de Dezembro
- Casa Pia
- Futebol Benfica
- Loures
- O Elvas
- Operário
- Oriental
- Praiense
- Sintrense
- Sporting Ideal

Series H (10 teams)

- Almodôvar
- Barreirense
- Cova da Piedade
- Esperança de Lagos
- Ferreiras
- Louletano
- Moura
- Pinhalnovense
- Quarteirense
- União de Montemor

Portuguese District Football Associations (44 teams)

- Alba
- Aliados de Lordelo
- Aljustrelense
- Amiense
- Amora
- Ansião
- Atalaia do Campo
- Atlético de Reguengos
- Avanca
- Castro Daire
- Castrense
- Cerveira
- Desportivo de Ronfe
- Eirense
- Fabril Barreiro
- Gafetense
- Igreja Nova
- Juventude de Évora
- Lousada
- Lusitano VRSA
- Maria da Fonte
- Marinhas
- Marinhense
- Merelinense
- Nogueirense
- O Grandolense
- Os Oriolenses
- Oliveira do Bairro
- Oliveira do Hospital
- Pedras Rubras
- Pêro Pinheiro
- Piense
- Sacavenense
- Santa Eulália
- Sampedrense
- Sanjoanense
- Santiago
- Torre de Moncorvo
- Torres Novas
- Vieira
- Vila Cortez
- Vila Meã
- Vila Pouca de Aguiar
- Vitória de Sernache

== Schedule ==
All draws were held at the FPF headquarters in Lisbon.

Round	Draw date	Main date(s)	Fixtures	Teams	Prize money
First round	29 July 2013	1 September 2013	44	156 → 112	€2,000
Second round	9 September 2013	21–22 September 2013	48	112 → 64	€3,000
Third round	30 September 2013	19–20 October 2013	32	64 → 32	€4,000
Fourth round	24 October 2013	9–10 November 2013	16	32 → 16	€5,000
Fifth round	22 November 2013	4–5 January 2014	8	16 → 8	€7,500
Quarter-finals	9 January 2014	5–6 February 2014	4	8 → 4	€10,000
Semi-finals	9 January 2014	26 March 2014 (1st leg); 16 April 2014 (2nd leg)	4	4 → 2	€15,000
Final	9 January 2014	18 May 2014	1	2 → 1	€150,000 (runner-up) €300,000 (winner)

== First round ==
A total of 123 teams from the Campeonato Nacional (CN) and District Leagues (D) entered this round. The draw was held on 29 July 2013 and determined the 88 teams contesting this round and the remaining 35 teams receiving a bye. Matches were played on 1 September 2013.

Number of teams per league entering this round
Primeira Liga	Segunda Liga	Campeonato Nacional	District Leagues	Total
16 / 16	17 / 17	79 / 79	44 / 44	156 / 156

Teams receiving a first-round bye

- Alba (D)
- Atlético Riachense (CN)
- Bustelo (CN)
- Caldas (CN)
- Carapinheirense (CN)
- Cerveira (D)
- Cinfães (CN)
- Cova da Piedade (CN)
- Desportivo de Ronfe (D)
- Eirense (D)
- Esperança de Lagos (CN)
- Fafe (CN)
- Famalicão (CN)
- Felgueiras 1932 (CN)
- Gondomar (CN)
- Igreja Nova (D)
- Juventude de Évora (D)
- Limianos (CN)
- Louletano (CN)
- Loures (CN)
- Lusitano FCV (CN)
- Lusitano VRSA (D)
- Marinhense (D)
- Mirandela (CN)
- O Grandolense (D)
- Os Oriolenses (D)
- Pedras Rubras (D)
- Pedras Salgadas (CN)
- Piense (D)
- Praiense (CN)
- Sourense (CN)
- Sporting Ideal (CN)
- União de Montemor (CN)
- Vilaverdense (CN)
- Vitória de Sernache (D)

Fixtures

- Oliveira do Bairro (D) 0 – 2 Fabril Barreiro (D)
- Santiago (D) 0 – 1 Estarreja (CN)
- Fátima (CN) 2 – 0 Castro Daire (D)
- Santa Eulália (D) 2 – 1 (a.e.t.) Portomosense (CN)
- Sousense (CN) 2 – 1 Moura (CN)
- Sintrense (CN) 1 – 2 Mafra (CN)
- Pêro Pinheiro (D) 1 – 1 (4–5p) Torres Novas (D)
- Vila Pouca de Aguiar (D) 0 – 1 Santa Maria (CN)
- Atalaia do Campo (D) 0 – 7 Alcanenense (CN)
- Operário (CN) 1 – 1 (4–3p) Salgueiros 08 (CN)
- Valenciano (CN) 3 – 4 Cesarense (CN)
- Vieira (D) 0 – 3 AD Nogueirense (CN)
- O Elvas (CN) 1 – 2 (a.e.t.) Barreirense (CN)
- Vila Flor (CN) 0 – 0 (0–3p) Merelinense (D)
- Vizela (CN) 2 – 0 Pampilhosa (CN)
- Boavista (CN) 1 – 0 (a.e.t.) 1º de Dezembro (CN)
- Joane (CN) 0 – 1 Maria da Fonte (D)
- Lourinhanense (CN) 0 – 1 Lusitânia Lourosa (CN)
- AD Oliveirense (CN) 0 – 0 (3–2p) Vila Meã (D)
- Ribeirão (CN) 6 – 0 Sanjoanense (D)
- Almodôvar (CN) 0 – 1 Ninense (CN)
- Vila Cortez (D) 2 – 4 Castrense (D)
- Bragança (CN) 0 – 1 Avanca (D)
- Benfica Castelo Branco (CN) 0 – 0 (2–0p) Carregado (CN)
- Sacavenense (D) 3 – 0 Sampedrense (D)
- Camacha (CN) 5 – 0 Ansião (D)
- Amarante (CN) 1 – 3 Freamunde (CN)
- Aljustrelense (D) 2 – 2 (3–0p) Casa Pia (CN)
- Águias do Moradal (CN) 0 – 2 Sporting de Espinho (CN)
- São João de Ver (CN) 3 – 2 Ferreiras (CN)
- Atlético de Reguengos (D) 0 – 1 Varzim (CN)
- Pinhalnovense (CN) 1 – 1 (4–1p) Coimbrões (CN)
- Torre de Moncorvo (D) 1 – 2 Perafita (CN)
- Marinhas (D) 3 – 0 Naval (CN)
- União de Leiria (CN) 2 – 1 (a.e.t.) Torreense (CN)
- Grijó (CN) 2 – 2 (5–4p) Lousada (D)
- Lixa (CN) 1 – 2 Tourizense (CN)
- Gafetense (D) 2 – 1 Vianense (CN)
- Anadia (CN) 0 – 1 Sertanense (CN)
- Oriental (CN) 7 – 0 Nogueirense FC (D)
- Quarteirense (CN) 1 – 2 Amora (D)
- Amiense (D) 0 – 4 Tirsense (CN)
- Futebol Benfica (CN) 1 – 0 Oliveira do Hospital (D)
- Aliados de Lordelo (D) 3 – 2 Manteigas (CN)

== Second round ==
Seventeen teams from the Segunda Liga (II) joined the 44 first-round winners and the 35 teams given a bye into the second round. The draw was made on 9 September 2013 and matches were played on 21 and 22 September.

Number of teams per league entering this round
Primeira Liga	Segunda Liga	Campeonato Nacional	District Leagues	Total
16 / 16	17 / 17	53 / 79	26 / 44	112 / 156

Fixtures

- Fafe (CN) 2 – 1 Perafita (CN)
- Chaves (II) 8 – 0 Avanca (D)
- Farense (II) 2 – 2 (7–6p) Lusitânia Lourosa (CN)
- Marinhense (D) 0 – 6 Caldas (CN)
- Benfica Castelo Branco (CN) 2 – 1 União da Madeira (II)
- Lusitano FCV (CN) 2 – 1 Futebol Benfica (CN)
- São João de Ver (CN) 5 – 0 Lusitano VRSA (D)
- Cerveira (D) 1 – 3 Cova da Piedade (CN)
- Académico de Viseu (II) 2 – 1 AD Nogueirense (CN)
- Beira-Mar (II) 4 – 1 Grijó (CN)
- Santa Eulália (D) 2 – 0 Ninense (CN)
- Felgueiras 1932 (CN) 2 – 0 Bustelo (CN)
- Maria da Fonte (D) 2 – 3 (a.e.t.) O Grandolense (D)
- Fátima (CN) 1 – 1 (1–0p) Sporting Ideal (CN)
- Vilaverdense (CN) 1 – 0 Atlético Riachense (CN)
- Varzim (CN) 3 – 0 Sporting de Espinho (CN)
- Esperança de Lagos (CN) 1 – 0 Pedras Rubras (D)
- Oliveirense (II) 2 – 1 Limianos (CN)
- União de Leiria (CN) 3 – 1 Marinhas (D)
- Sporting da Covilhã (II) 3 – 1 Tourizense (CN)
- Ribeirão (CN) 4 – 0 Juventude de Évora (D)
- Estarreja (CN) 1 – 5 Cinfães (CN)
- Pinhalnovense (CN) 0 – 1 Santa Clara (II)
- Santa Maria (CN) 4 – 1 Cesarense (CN)
- Atlético CP (II) 0 – 0 (1–0p) Mirandela (CN)
- Alba (D) 2 – 1 União de Montemor (CN)
- Loures (CN) 2 – 2 (4–3p) Carapinheirense (CN)
- Tondela (II) 5 – 1 Torres Novas (D)
- Alcanenense (CN) 3 – 1 Barreirense (CN)
- Famalicão (CN) 3 – 0 Eirense (D)
- Leixões (II) 2 – 0 Sacavenense (D)
- Mafra (CN) 3 – 0 Os Oriolenses (D)
- Gafetense (D) 1 – 1 (4–1p) Sourense (CN)
- Fabril Barreiro (D) 0 – 2 Operário (CN)
- Freamunde (CN) 4 – 0 Desportivo de Ronfe (D)
- AD Oliveirense (CN) 1 – 0 Vizela (CN)
- Piense (D) 2 – 2 (4–3p) Vitória de Sernache (D)
- Castrense (D) 2 – 3 Camacha (CN)
- F.C. Penafiel (II) 2 – 1 Tirsense (CN)
- Moreirense (II) 9 – 0 Merelinense (D)
- Boavista (CN) 1 – 2 Portimonense (II)
- Aljustrelense (D) 3 – 1 Igreja Nova (D)
- Trofense (II) 3 – 0 Pedras Salgadas (CN)
- Louletano (CN) 2 – 0 Praiense (CN)
- Sertanense (CN) 4 – 2 Amora (D)
- Feirense (II) 2 – 1 Sousense (CN)
- Oriental (CN) 1 – 0 Aliados de Lordelo (D)
- Gondomar (CN) 1 – 2 Desportivo das Aves (II)

== Third round ==
The 16 teams from the Primeira Liga (I) joined the 48-second-round winners in the third round. The draw was held on 30 September 2013 and matches were played on 19 and 20 October 2013.

Number of teams per league entering this round
Primeira Liga	Segunda Liga	Campeonato Nacional	District Leagues	Total
16 / 16	16 / 17	26 / 79	6 / 44	64 / 156

Fixtures

19 October 2013	Cinfães (CN)	0–1	Benfica (I)	Estádio Municipal Professor Cerveira Pinto, Cinfães
14:30 WEST			John 52'	Attendance: 7,000; Referee: Rui Costa

19 October 2013	Mafra (CN)	0–1	Beira-Mar (II)	Estádio Doutor Mário Silveira, Mafra
14:30 WEST			Dieguinho 56'	Attendance: 500; Referee: Hugo Miguel

19 October 2013	Aljustrelense (D)	0–1	Desportivo das Aves (II)	Estádio Municipal de Aljustrel, Aljustrel
15:00 WEST			Pereira 26'	Referee: Bruno Paixão

19 October 2013	Fátima (CN)	0–3	Vitória de Guimarães (I)	Estádio Municipal de Fátima, Fátima
15:00 WEST			Russi 7', 35'; Barrientos 86'	Referee: Duarte Gomes

19 October 2013	Leixões (II)	1–0	Felgueiras 1932 (CN)	Estádio do Mar, Matosinhos
15:00 WEST	Daniel Materazzi 22'			Referee: Daniel Cardoso

19 October 2013	Oliveirense (II)	1–3	Paços de Ferreira (I)	Estádio Carlos Osório, Oliveira de Azeméis
15:00 WEST	Lima 21' (pen.)		Manuel José 10', 56' (pen.); S. Oliveira 73'	Referee: Luís Ferreira

19 October 2013	Penafiel (II)	4–2	Operário (CN)	Estádio Municipal 25 de Abril, Penafiel
15:00 WEST	João Pedro 18'; H. Ferreira 71'; Dani 77'; Fontes 90'		Carlos Mota 23'; Stehb 80'	Referee: Pedro Ferreira

19 October 2013	Sporting da Covilhã (II)	2–1	Santa Clara (II)	Estádio Municipal José Santos Pinto, Covilhã
15:00 WEST	Castanheira 45+1'; Gui 50'		Moura 81'	Referee: Jorge Tavares

19 October 2013	Gafetense (D)	0–2	Braga (I)	Estádio Doutor Armando Pequito, Crato
15:30 WEST			Edinho 44' (pen.); R. Silva 66'	Referee: Carlos Xistra

19 October 2013	Moreirense (II)	0–2	Estoril (I)	Parque de Jogos Comendador Joaquim de Almeida Freitas, Moreira de Cónegos
16:00 WEST			Sebá 71'; Leal 84'	Referee: Cosme Machado

19 October 2013	Porto (I)	1–0	Trofense (II)	Estádio do Dragão, Porto
19:00 WEST	Varela 25'			Attendance: 21,117; Referee: Manuel Oliveira

20 October 2013	Camacha (CN)	2–1 (a.e.t.)	Vilaverdense (CN)	Complexo Desportivo da Camacha, Santa Cruz
14:30 WEST	João Santos 53'; Júlio 109'		Graça 2'	Referee: Nuno Alvo

20 October 2013	Fafe (CN)	6–0	Piense (D)	Parque Municipal dos Desportos de Fafe, Fafe
14:30 WEST	Tiago 12'; Adul 22', 41', 74'; João Leite 44'; Filipe 57'			Referee: Marco Cruz

20 October 2013	Lusitano FCV (CN)	1–2	Olhanense (I)	Estádio dos Trambelos, Viseu
14:30 WEST	Johnny 63'		Bigazzi 46'; Lucas 52'	Referee: Jorge Ferreira

20 October 2013	Ribeirão (CN)	2–0	São João de Ver (CN)	Estádio do Passal, Vila Nova de Famalicão
14:30 WEST	Diego 37'; Jefferson 41'			Referee: Carlos Dias

20 October 2013	Santa Maria (CN)	1–0	Nacional (I)	Estádio da Devesa, Galegos
14:30 WEST	Telmo 39'			Referee: Jorge Sousa

20 October 2013	Atlético CP (II)	1–0	Santa Eulália (D)	Estádio da Tapadinha, Lisbon
15:00 WEST	Martins 90+3'			Referee: José Laranjeira

20 October 2013	Benfica Castelo Branco (CN)	1–2	Chaves (II)	Estádio Municipal Vale do Romeiro, Castelo Branco
15:00 WEST	Marocas 78'		Barry 9'; Kuca 90+1'	Referee: Carlos Espadinha

20 October 2013	Esperança de Lagos (CN)	0–3	Rio Ave (I)	Estádio Municipal de Lagos, Lagos
15:00 WEST			Tarantini 4'; Vilas Boas 19'; Lopes 44'	Referee: Bruno Esteves

20 October 2013	Gil Vicente (I)	5–0	Caldas (CN)	Estádio Cidade de Barcelos, Barcelos
15:00 WEST	Viana 45+3'; Danielson 73'; Avto 77'; Vilela 82' (pen.), 84' (pen.)			Referee: Vasco Santos

20 October 2013	Louletano (CN)	0–2	Famalicão (CN)	Estádio Municipal de Loulé, Loulé
15:00 WEST			Perdigão 8'; Reguila 45+3'	Referee: Bruno Vieira

20 October 2013	Loures (CN)	0–3	Oliveirense (CN)	Campo José da Silva Faria, Loures
15:00 WEST			Nilson 49', 67', 76'	Referee: Luís Catita

20 October 2013	Marítimo (I)	3–1	Freamunde (CN)	Estádio dos Barreiros, Funchal
15:00 WEST	Soares 4'; Dias 51'; Derley 74'		Joel 9' (pen.)	Referee: Rui Silva

20 October 2013	Oriental (CN)	1–1 (a.e.t.) (3–5 p)	Académico de Viseu (II)	Campo Engenheiro Carlos Salema, Lisbon
15:00 WEST	Nogueira 40'		Cafú 90+4'	Referee: Fábio Veríssimo
	Penalties
	Pedro Alves (penalty missed); Bastos (penalty scored); Lopo (penalty scored); Luís Pedro (penalty scored); Anderson (penalty scored)		(penalty scored) Diogo Alves; (penalty scored) Lança; (penalty scored) Cafú; (penalty scored) Monteiro; (penalty scored) Martins

20 October 2013	Sertanense (CN)	2–0	O Grandolense (D)	Campo de Jogos Doutor Marques dos Santos, Sertã
15:00 WEST	Silveira 38' (pen.); Nilson 56'			Referee: Rui Mendes

20 October 2013	União de Leiria (CN)	1–3 (a.e.t.)	Tondela (II)	Estádio Dr. Magalhães Pessoa, Leiria
15:00 WEST	Vaz 50'		Marreco 62'; Barros 107'; Gbale 113'	Referee: Tiago Martins

20 October 2013	Varzim (CN)	1–4	Arouca (I)	Estádio do Varzim Sport Club, Póvoa de Varzim
15:00 WEST	Tiago Lopes 25' (pen.)		Roberto 11', 28'; Simão 57' (pen.); Bruno Amaro 68'	Referee: Manuel Mota

20 October 2013	Vitória de Setúbal (I)	3–1	Alcanenense (CN)	Estádio do Bonfim, Setúbal
15:00 WEST	Cohene 33', 45+1'; Pedro 74'		Zilio 11'	Referee: João Capela

20 October 2013	Belenenses (I)	2–2 (a.e.t.) (2–4 p)	Académica de Coimbra (I)	Estádio do Restelo, Lisbon
15:30	Fredy 39', 70' (pen.)		Diakité 51' (o.g.); Alexandre 62'	Attendance: 2,900; Referee: Marco Ferreira
	Penalties
	F. Ferreira (penalty scored); Fredy (penalty scored); Afonso (penalty missed); Diawara (penalty missed)		(penalty scored) Cleyton; (penalty scored) Alexandre; (penalty scored) Marcelo Goiano; (penalty scored) Abdi

20 October 2013	Feirense (II)	2–2 (a.e.t.) (5–3 p)	Farense (II)	Estádio Marcolino de Castro, Santa Maria da Feira
16:00	Gonçalves 34' (pen.), 77' (pen.)		Adelaja 55'; Luzardo 79'	Referee: António Moreira
	Penalties
	Barge (penalty scored); Marcelo (penalty scored); Icaro (penalty scored); Gonçalves (penalty scored); Pocellis (penalty scored)		(penalty missed) San Martín; (penalty scored) Luzardo; (penalty scored) Ibukun; (penalty scored) Adelaja

20 October 2013	Portimonense (II)	0–0 (a.e.t.) (3–4 p)	Cova da Piedade (CN)	Estádio Municipal de Portimão, Portimão
16:00				Referee: Rui Rodrigues
	Penalties
	Quinaz (penalty scored); Anderson Galdino (penalty scored); Moreno (penalty missed); Luís Pedro (penalty scored); Kanazaki (penalty missed)		(penalty scored) Rúben Nunes; (penalty scored) Hugo Rosa; (penalty scored) Aires; (penalty scored) Chiquinho

20 October 2013	Sporting CP (I)	8–1	Alba (D)	Estádio José Alvalade, Lisbon
18:00	Eduardo 16'; Rojo 20'; Montero 31', 57', 89'; Capel 59'; Vítor 67'; Slimani 86'		Pesquina 73'	Attendance: 20,498; Referee: Nuno Almeida

== Fourth round ==
The draw for the fourth round took place on 24 October 2013 and matches were played on 16, 17 and 24 November and 4 December 2013.

Number of teams per league entering this round
Primeira Liga	Segunda Liga	Campeonato Nacional	District Leagues	Total
14 / 16	10 / 17	8 / 79	0 / 44	32 / 156

Fixtures

9 November 2013	Cova da Piedade (CN)	0–0 (a.e.t.) (3–4 p)	Gil Vicente (I)	Estádio Municipal José Martins Vieira, Cova da Piedade
14:00 WET				Referee: Rui Silva
	Penalties
	Chiquinho (penalty missed); Rúben Nunes (penalty scored); Serginho (penalty scored); França (penalty scored); Márcio Dieb (penalty missed)		(penalty scored) Paulinho; (penalty scored) Halisson; (penalty scored) Éder; (penalty scored) Pimenta

9 November 2013	Ribeirão (CN)	0–2	Penafiel (II)	Estádio do Passal, Vila Nova de Famalicão
14:00 WET			Lopes 38'; Mbala 55'	Referee: Hélder Malheiro

9 November 2013	Arouca (I)	2–0	Chaves (II)	Estádio Municipal de Arouca, Arouca
15:00 WET	Mika 77'; Roberto 82'			Attendance: 1,486; Referee: Olegário Benquerença

9 November 2013	Benfica (I)	4–3 (a.e.t.)	Sporting CP (I)	Estádio da Luz, Lisbon
19:45 WET	Cardozo 12', 42', 45'; Luisão 97'		Capel 37'; Maurício 62'; Slimani 90+2'	Attendance: 47,156; Referee: Duarte Gomes

10 November 2013	Camacha (CN)	1–2 (a.e.t.)	Atlético CP (II)	Complexo Desportivo da Camacha, Madeira
14:00 WET	Freitas 52'		Caipiro 89'; Varela 116' (pen.)	Referee: Jorge Faustino

10 November 2013	Rio Ave (I)	4–2	Sertanense (CN)	Estádio do Rio Ave FC, Vila do Conde
14:00 WET	Tarantini 12'; Braga 30'; Hassan 34'; Del Valle 41'		Traquina 48'; Renato Silva 58'	Referee: Hugo Pacheco

10 November 2013	Académica de Coimbra (I)	1–1 (a.e.t.) (4–3 p)	Académico de Viseu (II)	Estádio Cidade de Coimbra, Coimbra
15:00 WET	Valente 93'		Zé Rui 113'	Attendance: 1,486; Referee: Paulo Baptista
	Penalties
	Cleyton (penalty missed); Alexandre (penalty scored); Valente (penalty scored); Ivanildo (penalty scored); Magique (penalty scored)		(penalty missed) Diogo Alves; (penalty scored) Lança; (penalty missed) Luisinho; (penalty scored) Monteiro; (penalty scored) Martins

10 November 2013	Famalicão (CN)	0–1 (a.e.t.)	Estoril (I)	Estádio Municipal 22 de Junho, Vila Nova de Famalicão
16:00 WET			Sebá 117'	Attendance: 3,000; Referee: Manuel Oliveira

10 November 2013	Marítimo (I)	3–0	Oliveirense (CN)	Estádio dos Barreiros, Funchal
16:00 WET	Olim 5'; Héldon 44'; Derley 90+1'			Referee: Jorge Ferreira

10 November 2013	Olhanense (I)	1–3	Braga (I)	Estádio José Arcanjo, Olhão
17:00 WET	Regula 50'		Eder 1'; R. Silva 87', 90+3'	Referee: Vasco Santos

10 November 2013	Vitória de Setúbal (I)	2–1	Santa Maria (CN)	Estádio do Bonfim, Setúbal
16:00 WET	Cohene 18'; Cardozo 45'	Report	Alex 84'	Attendance: 1,600; Referee: Nuno Almeida

10 November 2013	Vitória de Guimarães (I)	0–2	Porto (I)	Estádio D. Afonso Henriques, Guimarães
19:30 WET		Report	Fernando 15'; Martínez 41'	Attendance: 11,500; Referee: Jorge Sousa

17 November 2013	Fafe (CN)	1–2	Desportivo das Aves (II)	Parque Municipal dos Desportos de Fafe, Fafe
14:00 WET	João Carneiro 90+2'		Rocha 68'; João Paulo 76'	Referee: Tiago Martins

17 November 2013	Tondela (II)	0–1	Paços de Ferreira (I)	Estádio João Cardoso, Tondela
15:00 WET			Irobiso 90+1'	Referee: Cosme Machado

4 December 2013	Sporting da Covilhã (II)	1–2	Leixões (II)	Estádio Municipal José Santos Pinto, Covilhã
14:00 WET	Silva 37'		Araújo 11' (o.g.); Mailó 35'	Attendance: 700; Referee: Manuel Mota

4 December 2013	Beira-Mar (II)	3–2	Feirense (II)	Estádio Municipal de Aveiro, Aveiro
15:00 WET	Luís Gustavo 18'; Willyan 8', 24'		Porcellis 5' (pen.); Cris 39'	Attendance: 350; Referee: Jorge Tavares

== Fifth round ==
The draw for the fifth round took place on 22 November 2013 and matches were played on 4 and 5 January 2014.

Number of teams per league entering this round
Primeira Liga	Segunda Liga	Campeonato Nacional	District Leagues	Total
11 / 16	5 / 17	0 / 79	0 / 44	16 / 156

Fixtures

4 January 2014	Leixões (II)	1–5	Estoril (I)	Estádio do Mar, Matosinhos
15:00 WET	Mailó 76'		Lopes 11', 23', 28', 31'; Gerso 90+2'	Referee: Carlos Xistra

4 January 2014	Rio Ave (I)	1–0	Vitória de Setúbal (I)	Estádio do Rio Ave FC, Vila do Conde
17:00 WET	Ukra 90' (pen.)			Referee: Luís Ferreira

4 January 2014	Porto (I)	6–0	Atlético CP (II)	Estádio do Dragão, Porto
18:00 WET	Varela 24', 73'; Defour 37'; Marinheiro 47' (o.g.); Otamendi 75'; Kelvin 90'			Attendance: 20,117; Referee: Jorge Tavares

4 January 2014	Benfica (I)	5–0	Gil Vicente (I)	Estádio da Luz, Lisbon
20:15 WET	Rodrigo 3', 38'; Marković 16'; Lima 58' (pen.), 90+2'			Attendance: 15,504; Referee: Nuno Almeida

5 January 2014	Paços de Ferreira (I)	1–2	Desportivo das Aves (II)	Estádio Capital do Móvel, Paços de Ferreira
15:00 WET	Bebé 43'		Poulson 72', 83'	Referee: Bruno Esteves

5 January 2014	Marítimo (I)	2–3	Penafiel (II)	Estádio dos Barreiros, Funchal
15:00 WET	Ervões 12' (o.g.); Héldon 68'		Lopes 26', 56'; Aldair 36'	Referee: João Capela

5 January 2014	Beira-Mar (II)	0–1	Académica de Coimbra (I)	Estádio Municipal de Aveiro, Aveiro
15:00 WET			Magique 25'	Attendance: 1,043; Referee: Pedro Proença

5 January 2014	Braga (I)	2–0	Arouca (I)	Estádio AXA, Braga
19:15 WET	Pardo 5'; R. Silva 78'			Referee: Jorge Sousa

== Quarter-finals ==
The draw for the quarter-finals took place on 9 January 2014, and matches were played on 5 and 6 February 2014.

Number of teams per league entering this round
Primeira Liga	Segunda Liga	Campeonato Nacional	District Leagues	Total
6 / 16	2 / 17	0 / 79	0 / 44	8 / 156

Fixtures

5 February 2014	Penafiel (II)	0–1	Benfica (I)	Estádio Municipal 25 de Abril, Penafiel
19:00 WET			Sulejmani 84'	Attendance: 5,000; Referee: João Capela

5 February 2014	Porto (I)	2–1	Estoril (I)	Estádio do Dragão, Porto
21:00 WET	Quaresma 43'; Ghilas 87'		Babanco 27'	Attendance: 10,507; Referee: Rui Costa

6 February 2014	Rio Ave (I)	1–0	Académica de Coimbra (I)	Estádio do Rio Ave FC, Vila do Conde
19:00 WET	Braga 77'

6 February 2014	Braga (I)	3–1 (a.e.t.)	Desportivo das Aves (II)	Estádio AXA, Braga
21:00 WET	Alan 3' (pen.); Rusescu 94'; Santos 103'		Pereira 32' (pen.)	Referee: Bruno Paixão

== Semi-finals ==
The semi-final pairings were determined on 9 January 2014, following the draw for the quarter-finals. This round was played over two legs, with the first leg played on 26 March and the second leg played on 16 April 2014.

Number of teams per league entering this round
Primeira Liga	Segunda Liga	Campeonato Nacional	District Leagues	Total
4 / 16	0 / 17	0 / 79	0 / 44	4 / 156

=== First leg ===
26 March 2014	Braga (I)	0–0	Rio Ave (I)	Estádio AXA, Braga
19:00 WET				Attendance: 5,115; Referee: Carlos Xistra

26 March 2014	Porto (I)	1–0	Benfica (I)	Estádio do Dragão, Porto
21:00 WET	Martínez 6'			Attendance: 34,499; Referee: Marco Ferreira

=== Second leg ===
16 April 2014	Benfica (I)	3–1 (3–2 agg.)	Porto (I)	Estádio da Luz, Lisbon
21:45 WET	Salvio 17'; Pérez 59' (pen.); Gomes 80'		Varela 52'	Attendance: 45,380; Referee: Pedro Proença

16 April 2014	Rio Ave (I)	2–0 (2–0 agg.)	Braga (I)	Estádio dos Arcos, Vila do Conde
22:15 WET	Ukra 27'; Ribeiro 69'			Attendance: 7,000; Referee: Artur Soares Dias

== Final ==
18 May 2014
17:00 WEST

Benfica	1–0	Rio Ave
Gaitán 20'

Estádio Nacional, Oeiras
Attendance: 37,150
Referee: Carlos Xistra (Castelo Branco)
