= Adelaja =

Adélàjà is a surname of Yoruba origin, meaning "the crown or royalty settles the battle, or has calmed the fight".

Notable people with the surname include:

- Abraham Adelaja (born 1988), Nigerian footballer
- Adesoji Adelaja (born 1956), Nigerian academic
- Sunday Adelaja (born 1967), Nigerian-born evangelist
