= 2013–14 Campeonato Nacional de Seniores =

1st season of the Campeonato Nacional de Seniores football league

Campeonato Nacional de Seniores
- Season: 2013–14
- Champions: Freamunde
- Promoted: Freamunde; Oriental; V. Guimarães "B"; Boavista (administrative promotion to Primeira Liga)

The 2013–14 Campeonato Nacional de Seniores was the first season of the newly created third-tier football league in Portugal after the merging of the Segunda Divisão and Terceira Divisão, and the 67th season of recognised third-tier football in Portugal. It began on 25 August 2013 and finished on 10 June 2014.

This first edition consisted of 19 clubs from the District Championships, 39 from the Segunda Divisão, 19 from the Terceira Divisão and the three teams relegated from the Segunda Liga during the 2012–13 season, making 80 clubs.

S.C. Freamunde won the overall competition, defeating Clube Oriental de Lisboa 3–2 in the final.

== Overview ==
The league was divided into eight series of 10 clubs placed geographically, with the exception of teams from the Madeira Islands (divided through the first series) and from the Azores Islands (divided through the last series).

After a First Stage in a home-and-away system, the first two best placed teams of each league played in two groups of 8 teams in a Second Stage with each league winner earning a promotion to the Segunda Liga, plus a two-round play-off winner between the two second placed teams. The two group winners then played a Grand Final on neutral ground for the overall Campeonato Nacional title.

The remaining 8 clubs from each league from the First Stage played in 8 different groups with the last two placed teams being relegated to the District Championships. The 6th placed teams from those leagues then played a two-round play-off between themselves to decide the remaining four clubs to be relegated.

== Teams ==
Qualified teams:

Relegated from Segunda Liga:

- Naval (Note: Naval didn't register in the Segunda Liga due to debts, switching its place with relegated Sporting da Covilhã.)
- V. Guimarães "B"
- Freamunde

From the Second Division (3rd level until 2012–13):

North Zone

- Amarante
- Boavista
- Fafe
- Famalicão
- Gondomar
- Joane
- Limianos
- Mirandela
- Ribeirão
- Tirsense
- Vizela
- Varzim
- Vilaverdense

Center Zone

- Anadia
- Benfica Castelo Branco
- Bustelo
- Cesarense
- Cinfães
- Coimbrões
- Nogueirense
- Operário
- Sporting de Espinho
- Pampilhosa
- São João de Ver
- Sousense
- Tourizense

South Zone

- 1.º de Dezembro
- Carregado
- Casa Pia
- Fátima
- Futebol Benfica
- Louletano
- Mafra
- Oriental
- Pinhalnovense
- Quarteirense
- Sertanense
- Torreense
- União de Leiria

Promoted from the Third Division (4th level until 2012–13):

Series A

- Bragança
- Santa Maria
- Vianense

Series B

- Felgueiras 1932
- AD Oliveirense

Series C

- Estarreja
- Grijó
- Salgueiros 08

Series D

- Alcanenense
- Caldas
- Sourense

Series E

- Barreirense
- Lourinhanense
- Sintrense

Series F

- Esperança Lagos
- Moura
- União de Montemor

Series Azores

- Praiense
- Sporting Ideal

Promoted from the District Championships (5th level until 2012–13):

- Algarve FA: Ferreiras
- Aveiro FA: Lusitânia Lourosa
- Beja FA: Almodôvar
- Braga FA: Ninense
- Bragança FA: Vila Flor
- Castelo Branco FA: Águias do Moradal
- Coimbra FA: Carapinheirense
- Évora FA: no team (Note: The Évora FA District Champion, Os Oriolenses, relinquished their place in the league, being replaced by Perafita from the Porto AF (the most represented FA in the national leagues), as no team from the Évora FA wanted to replace Os Oriolenses and third division team Atlético de Reguengos (from the Évora FA) wasn't accepted by the FPF.)
- Guarda FA: Manteigas
- Leiria FA: Portomosense
- Lisboa FA: Loures
- Madeira FA: Camacha (Note: The Madeira FA District Champion, Câmara de Lobos, relinquished their place in the league. Cruzado Canicense, the championship runner-up was invited to take their place but also declined. Thus Camacha was invited and accepted.)
- Portalegre FA: O Elvas
- Porto FA: Lixa and Perafita
- Santarém FA: Atlético Riachense
- Setúbal FA: Cova da Piedade
- Viana do Castelo FA: Valenciano
- Vila Real FA: Pedras Salgadas
- Viseu FA: Lusitano Vildemoinhos

== First stage ==
=== Serie A ===
Pos	Team	Pld	W	D	L	GF	GA	GD	Pts	Qualification	LIM	BRG	FAF	MIR	VIA	STM	VIV	VLC	PDS	NIN
1	Limianos	18	10	4	4	27	16	+11	34	Promotion Zone		2–1	0–0	0–1	1–0	2–0	2–0	1–2	1–0	3–1
2	Bragança	18	9	6	3	25	17	+8	33	Promotion Zone	2–2		0–0	1–0	2–1	1–1	3–2	3–0	1–1	1–0
3	Fafe	18	8	9	1	21	9	+12	33	Relegation Zone	1–1	1–2		1–1	0–0	3–1	1–0	2–1	2–0	3–0
4	Mirandela	18	7	8	3	21	13	+8	29	Relegation Zone	2–0	2–0	1–1		1–0	2–0	0–1	2–1	1–1	1–1
5	Vianense	18	7	5	6	15	12	+3	26	Relegation Zone	2–1	1–1	0–0	0–0		0–0	1–0	0–1	3–1	1–0
6	Santa Maria	18	6	4	8	17	21	−4	22	Relegation Zone	1–2	0–2	0–2	1–3	1–0		0–0	0–2	3–2	2–0
7	Vilaverdense	18	5	6	7	12	15	−3	21	Relegation Zone	0–0	1–1	0–1	1–0	1–0	0–0		0–1	1–3	1–1
8	Valenciano	18	6	3	9	16	23	−7	21	Relegation Zone	1–4	0–1	1–1	1–1	1–2	0–2	0–1		2–1	2–1
9	Pedras Salgadas	18	3	6	9	17	27	−10	15	Relegation Zone	1–2	2–1	1–1	2–2	0–2	0–2	0–2	0–0		1–0
10	Ninense	18	1	5	12	11	29	−18	8	Relegation Zone	1–3	1–2	0–1	1–1	1–2	0–3	1–1	1–0	1–1	

Updated to match(es) played on 26 January 2014. Source:
Rules for classification: 1) points; 2) goal difference; 3) number of goals scored.

=== Serie B ===
Pos	Team	Pld	W	D	L	GF	GA	GD	Pts	Qualification	VGU	VIZ	F32	VAR	JOA	ADO	RIB	FAM	TIR	LIX
1	Vitória de Guimarães B	18	11	2	5	32	19	+13	35	Promotion Zone		4–0	2–2	3–0	1–0	1–0	5–5	2–1	1–0	4–0
2	Vizela	18	9	5	4	23	16	+7	32	Promotion Zone	0–1		0–0	2–1	2–0	2–0	1–0	1–1	2–0	2–0
3	Felgueiras 1932	18	8	6	4	28	17	+11	30	Relegation Zone	0–1	1–0		3–0	2–0	4–0	1–1	3–2	5–1	2–2
4	Varzim	18	9	3	6	25	21	+4	30	Relegation Zone	2–0	1–3	3–0		1–1	2–1	1–0	2–1	1–1	2–0
5	Joane	18	7	4	7	19	20	−1	25	Relegation Zone	3–1	3–1	1–0	1–1		2–1	1–2	1–0	1–1	1–0
6	AD Oliveirense	18	6	5	7	16	21	−5	23	Relegation Zone	0–3	0–1	1–0	2–0	3–1		1–1	2–1	1–1	0–0
7	Ribeirão	18	5	6	7	25	26	−1	21	Relegation Zone	2–1	1–1	1–2	1–2	0–1	2–3		1–2	2–2	2–0
8	Famalicão	18	5	5	8	20	20	0	20	Relegation Zone	2–0	1–1	1–1	2–1	0–0	0–1	0–1		0–0	4–1
9	Tirsense	18	3	10	5	16	25	−9	19	Relegation Zone	1–2	0–0	1–1	0–4	2–1	0–0	0–0	1–0		2–2
10	Lixa	18	2	4	12	15	34	−19	10	Relegation Zone	1–0	2–3	0–1	0–1	2–1	0–0	2–3	1–2	2–3	

Updated to match(es) played on 26 January 2014. Source:
Rules for classification: 1) points; 2) goal difference; 3) number of goals scored.

=== Serie C ===
Pos	Team	Pld	W	D	L	GF	GA	GD	Pts	Qualification	BOA	FRM	GND	AMR	S08	CAM	COI	SOU	PER	VLF
1	Boavista	18	14	3	1	40	12	+28	45	Promotion Zone		1–1	1–0	2–1	3–0	1–0	3–0	2–0	4–1	7–1
2	Freamunde	18	11	5	2	39	18	+21	38	Promotion Zone	0–2		2–3	1–1	3–0	5–3	4–0	1–0	2–0	4–0
3	Gondomar	18	9	7	2	25	14	+11	34	Relegation Zone	2–1	1–1		1–1	2–0	2–0	1–1	3–0	2–2	1–1
4	Amarante	18	7	6	5	29	21	+8	27	Relegation Zone	2–2	1–2	0–0		1–2	1–1	2–0	4–0	4–1	5–0
5	Salgueiros	18	7	4	7	21	22	−1	25	Relegation Zone	1–1	1–2	1–0	0–1		1–3	3–1	0–0	2–0	2–2
6	Camacha	18	6	3	9	23	25	−2	21	Relegation Zone	0–1	1–3	1–2	0–1	0–1		1–0	1–1	3–0	2–0
7	Coimbrões	18	4	6	8	22	29	−7	18	Relegation Zone	0–1	1–1	0–1	0–1	2–1	3–0		4–1	2–2	5–4
8	Sousense	18	4	6	8	18	25	−7	18	Relegation Zone	1–3	1–1	0–1	3–0	1–1	1–3	0–0		4–0	2–1
9	Perafita	18	2	6	10	16	38	−22	12	Relegation Zone	0–2	1–2	1–1	4–1	0–3	1–1	2–2	0–0		1–0
10	Vila Flor	18	1	4	13	20	49	−29	7	Relegation Zone	2–3	1–4	1–2	2–2	0–2	1–3	1–1	0–3	3–0	

Updated to match(es) played on 26 January 2014. Source:
Rules for classification: 1) points; 2) goal difference; 3) number of goals scored.

=== Serie D ===
Pos	Team	Pld	W	D	L	GF	GA	GD	Pts	Qualification	SJV	CSA	BUS	AND	LSL	CIN	GRI	LVD	SCE	EST
1	São João Ver	18	9	5	4	33	28	+5	32	Promotion Zone		0–2	2–2	2–2	2–1	1–3	1–0	4–4	1–0	2–0
2	Cesarense	18	8	6	4	26	18	+8	30	Promotion Zone	3–1		1–1	4–2	0–0	2–2	4–0	1–1	2–1	2–1
3	Bustelo	18	6	8	4	23	17	+6	26	Relegation Zone	1–0	1–1		1–0	2–0	0–0	1–2	5–0	1–1	2–1
4	Anadia	18	6	7	5	31	30	+1	25	Relegation Zone	3–3	2–1	1–0		2–1	0–0	3–2	3–1	0–0	4–4
5	Lusitânia Lourosa	18	6	5	7	19	17	+2	23	Relegation Zone	1–2	0–1	0–0	4–2		1–0	3–3	2–0	0–0	1–0
6	Cinfães	18	5	8	5	18	18	0	23	Relegation Zone	1–2	2–0	1–2	1–1	0–2		1–1	1–0	1–0	0–0
7	Grijó	18	4	9	5	29	30	−1	21	Relegation Zone	3–3	0–0	1–1	1–1	2–0	1–3		4–1	1–1	3–1
8	Lusitano Vildemoinhos	18	5	5	8	22	34	−12	20	Relegation Zone	0–2	0–1	3–1	3–2	1–0	2–0	2–2		1–1	2–1
9	Sporting de Espinho	18	4	6	8	17	20	−3	18	Relegation Zone	1–2	1–0	2–1	2–3	0–1	1–1	2–1	3–0		0–2
10	Estarreja	18	3	7	8	20	26	−6	16	Relegation Zone	1–3	3–1	0–0	1–2	1–1	0–0	1–1	1–1	2–1	

Updated to match(es) played on 26 January 2014. Source:
Rules for classification: 1) points; 2) goal difference; 3) number of goals scored.

=== Serie E ===
Pos	Team	Pld	W	D	L	GF	GA	GD	Pts	Qualification	BCC	STN	PAM	TOU	NOG	AGM	CRP	NAV	SRS	MTG
1	Benfica Castelo Branco	18	12	4	2	44	19	+25	40	Promotion Zone		1–1	3–3	1–0	4–1	2–1	4–0	3–1	3–2	4–1
2	Sertanense	18	11	3	4	31	21	+10	36	Promotion Zone	1–2		1–0	0–2	2–1	3–2	2–1	2–1	2–1	4–1
3	Pampilhosa	18	7	6	5	30	21	+9	27	Relegation Zone	1–4	0–2		1–0	0–1	4–1	0–0	1–1	2–4	2–0
4	Tourizense	18	7	4	7	18	16	+2	25	Relegation Zone	3–1	0–1	1–2		0–1	0–2	3–1	1–0	1–0	0–0
5	Nogueirense	18	6	6	6	19	23	−4	24	Relegation Zone	1–1	1–2	0–3	0–2		1–1	1–0	2–0	2–3	2–2
6	Águias do Moradal	18	5	6	7	25	26	−1	21	Relegation Zone	2–3	0–0	1–1	1–2	1–1		1–0	0–0	2–1	1–0
7	Carapinheirense	18	4	7	7	19	23	−4	19	Relegation Zone	0–0	2–0	0–0	2–2	0–0	4–3		2–0	1–1	2–3
8	Naval 1º de Maio	18	4	7	7	18	29	−11	19	Relegation Zone	1–0	2–2	1–1	2–0	1–1	0–5	3–2		2–2	0–3
9	Sourense	18	4	6	8	25	34	−9	18	Relegation Zone	0–5	4–3	1–6	0–0	1–2	3–0	0–0	1–2		1–1
10	Manteigas	18	2	7	9	14	31	−17	13	Relegation Zone	0–3	0–3	0–2	1–1	0–1	1–1	0–2	1–1	0–0	

Updated to match(es) played on 26 January 2014. Source:
Rules for classification: 1) points; 2) goal difference; 3) number of goals scored.

=== Serie F ===
Pos	Team	Pld	W	D	L	GF	GA	GD	Pts	Qualification	MAF	ULE	ALC	FAT	LRN	CAL	SCT	CAR	PMS	ATR
1	Mafra	18	12	6	0	37	14	+23	42	Promotion Zone		1–1	3–3	1–0	2–0	1–0	2–1	2–1	7–2	5–0
2	União de Leiria	18	10	5	3	28	17	+11	35	Promotion Zone	3–3		1–2	0–0	4–0	1–0	2–1	1–0	0–1	3–2
3	Alcanenense	18	8	6	4	22	13	+9	30	Relegation Zone	0–1	0–1		1–0	2–1	1–0	0–0	1–1	1–0	4–0
4	Fátima	18	7	6	5	29	14	+15	27	Relegation Zone	0–0	1–1	1–0		0–0	1–0	2–3	4–0	4–1	4–0
5	Lourinhanense	18	7	5	6	24	23	+1	26	Relegation Zone	1–2	2–2	1–0	2–0		1–0	2–0	2–1	4–0	4–1
6	Caldas	18	6	5	7	17	16	+1	23	Relegation Zone	1–1	0–2	0–1	1–1	2–0		0–0	1–1	2–0	2–1
7	Torreense	18	5	7	6	25	26	−1	22	Relegation Zone	1–1	0–1	2–2	0–5	1–1	1–2		2–1	3–2	5–1
8	Carregado	18	4	6	8	24	28	−4	18	Relegation Zone	0–2	0–1	1–1	2–1	3–0	3–3	1–1		2–3	3–1
9	Portomosense	18	2	5	11	19	42	−23	11	Relegation Zone	0–1	2–3	0–3	2–2	2–2	0–1	0–3	2–2		0–0
10	Atlético Riachense	18	1	5	12	12	44	−32	8	Relegation Zone	0–2	2–1	0–0	0–3	1–1	0–2	1–1	0–2	2–2	

Updated to match(es) played on 26 January 2014. Source:
Rules for classification: 1) points; 2) goal difference; 3) number of goals scored.

=== Serie G ===
Pos	Team	Pld	W	D	L	GF	GA	GD	Pts	Qualification	GSL	ORI	OPE	CPI	SNT	1ºD	PRA	SCI	SCE	CFB
1	Loures	18	10	6	2	30	16	+14	36	Promotion Zone		3–1	1–1	1–0	1–1	1–1	3–0	3–0	3–0	1–0
2	Oriental	18	11	2	5	37	17	+20	35	Promotion Zone	1–4		2–0	1–0	1–2	3–0	3–1	0–0	3–0	2–0
3	Operário	18	10	5	3	34	14	+20	35	Relegation Zone	2–2	3–1		3–1	1–0	2–0	4–1	0–0	1–0	5–0
4	Casa Pia	18	11	1	6	25	14	+11	34	Relegation Zone	1–2	0–2	1–0		1–0	3–1	1–0	1–0	7–0	0–0
5	Sintrense	18	10	4	4	25	13	+12	34	Relegation Zone	4–0	0–2	2–1	1–0		0–0	1–0	2–0	2–3	3–1
6	1º de Dezembro	18	7	6	5	32	25	+7	27	Relegation Zone	0–1	1–0	2–2	1–2	1–1		4–4	3–1	3–1	4–0
7	Praiense	18	5	2	11	26	34	−8	17	Relegation Zone	2–1	0–1	0–3	0–1	0–0	1–3		3–0	2–0	3–2
8	Sporting Ideal	18	4	5	9	25	30	−5	17	Relegation Zone	0–1	3–3	1–2	1–2	0–2	1–1	2–1		4–0	4–4
9	O Elvas	18	3	1	14	11	49	−38	10	Relegation Zone	1–1	0–6	0–4	0–1	0–1	1–3	2–1	0–4		2–1
10	Futebol Benfica	18	1	4	13	19	51	−32	7	Relegation Zone	1–1	0–5	0–0	1–3	1–3	1–4	3–7	2–4	2–1	

Updated to match(es) played on 26 January 2014. Source:
Rules for classification: 1) points; 2) goal difference; 3) number of goals scored.

=== Serie H ===
Pos	Team	Pld	W	D	L	GF	GA	GD	Pts	Qualification	CDP	FER	MAC	CVP	UNM	QUA	LOU	BAR	ALM	EPL
1	Pinhalnovense	18	10	6	2	28	11	+17	36	Promotion Zone		3–0	1–1	2–2	0–0	1–2	2–0	1–1	4–0	1–0
2	Ferreiras	18	9	7	2	25	15	+10	34	Promotion Zone	0–0		3–2	1–2	0–0	3–0	0–0	2–1	0–1	0–0
3	Moura	18	9	5	4	35	22	+13	32	Relegation Zone	2–1	1–1		4–0	0–3	3–1	1–3	2–1	3–0	3–1
4	Cova da Piedade	18	6	8	4	22	21	+1	26	Relegation Zone	1–1	2–2	1–3		0–0	0–0	1–0	3–0	2–1	1–0
5	União de Montemor	18	5	9	4	27	19	+8	24	Relegation Zone	0–1	0–1	3–3	1–0		1–2	2–1	1–1	5–1	1–1
6	Quarteirense	18	6	5	7	23	27	−4	23	Relegation Zone	1–2	1–1	0–3	1–1	1–1		1–0	0–1	4–2	3–0
7	Louletano	18	6	3	9	22	22	0	21	Relegation Zone	0–1	0–1	3–1	1–3	3–2	0–0		1–0	4–0	2–3
8	Barreirense	18	5	5	8	18	21	−3	20	Relegation Zone	0–1	1–2	0–0	1–0	1–1	3–1	1–0		5–0	1–0
9	Almodôvar	18	3	4	11	17	46	−29	13	Relegation Zone	0–2	1–2	0–0	2–2	1–4	3–1	2–1	2–0		1–1
10	Esperança de Lagos	18	2	6	10	14	27	−13	12	Relegation Zone	1–2	0–2	0–3	1–1	2–2	1–3	0–1	3–0	0–0	

Updated to match(es) played on 26 January 2014. Source:
Rules for classification: 1) points; 2) goal difference; 3) number of goals scored.

== Second stage ==
=== Promotion groups ===
==== North Zone ====
Pos	Team	Pld	W	D	L	GF	GA	GD	Pts	Promotion
1	Freamunde (P)	14	10	3	1	24	5	+19	33	Promotion to 2014–15 Segunda Liga
2	Vitória de Guimarães B (P)	14	8	4	2	29	13	+16	28	Third Place Playoff
3	Vizela	14	8	3	3	25	12	+13	27	
4	Boavista (P)	14	7	2	5	19	14	+5	23 (Note: Boavista promoted to Primeira Liga by invitation of LPFP.)	Promotion to 2014–15 Primeira Liga
5	Bragança	14	4	3	7	20	20	0	15	
6	São João de Ver	14	4	2	8	15	31	−16	14	
7	Cesarense	14	3	2	9	10	27	−17	11	
8	Limianos	14	1	3	10	8	28	−20	6	

Updated to match(es) played on 24 May 2014. Source:
Rules for classification: 1) points; 2) goal difference; 3) number of goals scored.
(P) Promoted
Notes:

Home \ Away	BOA	BRG	CSA	FRM	LIM	SJV	VGU	VIZ
Boavista		0–0	3–0	0–1	2–0	5–1	0–0	1–4
Bragança	0–2		2–0	1–1	3–0	5–1	1–2	1–1
Cesarense	1–0	1–0		0–3	0–2	5–2	1–5	0–1
Freamunde	3–0	2–1	1–0		3–1	3–0	0–0	1–0
Limianos	0–1	0–2	0–0	0–3		0–2	2–2	2–3
São João Ver	2–4	2–1	2–1	0–2	0–0		0–1	2–1
Guimarães	0–1	3–2	6–1	1–1	4–1	2–0		2–1
Vizela	2–0	5–1	0–0	1–0	3–0	1–1	2–1	

Updated to match(es) played on 24 May 2014. Source:
Legend: Blue = home team win; Yellow = draw; Red = away team win.

==== South Zone ====
Pos	Team	Pld	W	D	L	GF	GA	GD	Pts	Promotion
1	Oriental (P)	14	8	3	3	23	13	+10	27	Promotion to 2014–15 Segunda Liga
2	Benfica Castelo Branco	14	8	2	4	27	11	+16	26	Third Place Playoff
3	União de Leiria	14	7	3	4	15	16	−1	24	
4	Ferreiras	14	6	3	5	24	21	+3	21	
5	Sertanense	14	5	6	3	20	18	+2	21	
6	Mafra	14	4	4	6	12	14	−2	16	
7	Pinhalnovense	14	3	2	9	19	27	−8	11	
8	Loures	14	3	1	10	15	35	−20	10	

Updated to match(es) played on 24 May 2014. Source:
Rules for classification: 1) points; 2) goal difference; 3) number of goals scored.
(P) Promoted

Home \ Away	BCB	FER	LOU	MAF	ORI	PIN	SER	LEI
B.C. Branco		7–2	0–1	1–1	1–0	3–0	2–1	5–0
Ferreiras	1–2		5–1	0–2	1–1	1–0	1–1	2–0
Loures	1–0	0–3		0–3	0–4	2–3	1–2	0–2
Mafra	1–3	2–1	1–2		0–1	1–0	0–0	0–1
Oriental	1–0	0–2	4–2	0–0		2–1	2–1	1–2
Pinhalnovense	1–3	2–3	4–3	3–0	1–1		3–3	1–2
Sertanense	1–3	1–1	3–1	2–1	1–4	2–0		2–1
Leiria	1–0	2–1	1–1	0–0	1–2	1–0	1–1	

Updated to match(es) played on 24 May 2014. Source:
Legend: Blue = home team win; Yellow = draw; Red = away team win.

=== Third place playoff ===
==== First leg ====
1 June 2014

Benfica e Castelo Branco	0 – 0	Vitória de Guimarães B

Estádio Municipal Vale do Romeiro, Castelo Branco

==== Second leg ====
8 June 2014

Vitória de Guimarães B	2 – 0	Benfica e Castelo Branco

Vitória de Guimarães B is promoted to 2014–15 Segunda Liga.

=== Grand final ===
10 June 2014

Freamunde	3 – 2	Oriental

Estádio do Fontelo, Viseu

=== Relegation Groups ===
==== Serie A ====
Pos	Team	Pld	W	D	L	GF	GA	GD	Pts	Relegation
1	Fafe	14	6	4	4	20	14	+6	39 (Note: FAF 2–0 VIV; VIV 1–2 FAF)	
2	Vilaverdense	14	8	4	2	20	9	+11	39	
3	Vianense	14	6	6	2	19	13	+6	37	
4	Mirandela	14	4	7	3	18	13	+5	34	
5	Santa Maria	14	5	5	4	15	15	0	31	
6	Pedras Salgadas	14	3	6	5	12	15	−3	23	Play-out
7	Ninense (R)	14	3	5	6	12	18	−6	18	Relegation to Distritais
8	Valenciano (R)	14	1	3	10	11	29	−18	17	Relegation to Distritais

Updated to match(es) played on 24 May 2014. Source:
Rules for classification: 1) points; 2) goal difference; 3) number of goals scored.
(R) Relegated
Notes:

Home \ Away	FAF	MIR	NIN	PDS	STM	VLC	VIA	VIV
Fafe		3–1	1–1	2–1	0–2	3–0	1–1	2–0
Mirandela	3–2		3–1	3–0	1–1	4–1	0–1	2–2
Ninense	2–1	1–0		0–1	1–0	1–1	1–1	0–1
P. Salgadas	1–1	0–0	1–1		0–0	2–0	1–2	1–1
Santa Maria	1–0	1–1	1–1	2–1		3–1	0–2	0–2
Valenciano	0–2	0–0	5–1	0–2	1–3		2–2	0–3
Vianense	0–0	0–0	2–1	3–1	1–1	2–0		2–3
Vilaverdense	1–2	0–0	1–0	0–0	3–0	1–0	2–0	

Updated to match(es) played on 24 May 2014. Source:
Legend: Blue = home team win; Yellow = draw; Red = away team win.

==== Serie B ====
Pos	Team	Pld	W	D	L	GF	GA	GD	Pts	Relegation
1	Tirsense	14	6	7	1	17	10	+7	35	
2	AD Oliveirense	14	6	4	4	17	11	+6	34	
3	Famalicão	14	6	5	3	18	16	+2	33	
4	Varzim	14	4	5	5	15	15	0	32 (Note: F32 3–2 VAR; VAR 1–0 F32)	
5	Felgueiras 1932	14	5	2	7	21	21	0	32	
6	Ribeirão	14	5	5	4	22	19	+3	31 (Note: RIB 3–2 JOA; JOA 4–4 RIB)	Play-out
7	Joane (R)	14	5	3	6	25	27	−2	31	Relegation to Distritais
8	Lixa (R)	14	3	1	10	13	30	−17	15	Relegation to Distritais

Updated to match(es) played on 24 May 2014. Source:
Rules for classification: 1) points; 2) goal difference; 3) number of goals scored.
(R) Relegated
Notes:

Home \ Away	ADO	FAM	F32	JOA	LIX	RIB	TIR	VAR
Oliveirense		2–1	2–1	1–2	1–0	3–0	0–0	0–0
Famalicão	0–3		3–2	2–1	3–1	1–1	1–1	2–1
Felgueiras	2–1	0–1		3–0	2–1	0–2	2–2	3–2
Joane	1–0	2–1	3–2		4–1	4–4	1–2	2–2
Lixa	0–1	2–2	1–4	2–1		1–4	0–2	1–4
Ribeirão	1–1	0–1	2–0	3–2	1–2		1–2	1–1
Tirsense	2–2	0–0	0–0	1–1	1–0	1–2		2–0
Varzim	1–0	0–0	1–0	3–1	0–2	0–0	0–1	

Updated to match(es) played on 24 May 2014. Source:
Legend: Blue = home team win; Yellow = draw; Red = away team win.

==== Serie C ====
Pos	Team	Pld	W	D	L	GF	GA	GD	Pts	Relegation
1	Salgueiros 08	14	8	2	4	22	17	+5	39	
2	Gondomar	14	6	2	6	18	19	−1	37	
3	Amarante	14	6	3	5	19	15	+4	35	
4	Sousense	14	6	3	5	16	16	0	30	
5	Coimbrões	14	6	4	4	20	17	+3	31	
6	Camacha	14	3	6	5	17	18	−1	26	Play-out
7	Vila Flor (R)	14	5	4	5	18	18	0	23	Relegation to Distritais
8	Perafita (R)	14	2	4	8	13	23	−10	17	Relegation to Distritais

Updated to match(es) played on 24 May 2014. Source:
Rules for classification: 1) points; 2) goal difference; 3) number of goals scored.
(R) Relegated

Home \ Away	AMR	CAM	COI	GND	PER	S08	SOU	VLF
Amarante		1–1	2–1	1–2	3–0	3–2	3–0	0–1
Camacha	1–1		1–1	3–2	3–1	1–1	3–1	1–2
Coimbrões	2–0	0–0		1–3	2–1	2–0	3–0	1–1
Gondomar	1–2	1–0	1–2		2–2	1–0	0–0	2–1
Perafita	2–1	2–1	2–2	1–2		0–1	0–2	1–1
Salgueiros	0–0	2–1	2–1	2–1	2–0		3–1	4–1
Sousense	0–1	1–1	4–1	1–0	1–0	3–0		2–1
Vila Flor	2–1	2–1	0–1	3–0	1–1	2–3	0–0	

Updated to match(es) played on 24 May 2014. Source:
Legend: Blue = home team win; Yellow = draw; Red = away team win.

==== Serie D ====
Pos	Team	Pld	W	D	L	GF	GA	GD	Pts	Relegation
1	Cinfães	14	8	2	4	19	11	+8	38	
2	Anadia	14	6	4	4	17	14	+3	35	
3	Lusitano Vildemoinhos	14	7	3	4	16	11	+5	34	
4	Lusitânia Lourosa	14	5	4	5	11	10	+1	31	
5	Sporting de Espinho	14	5	4	5	18	17	+1	28 (Note: SCE 0–0 EST; EST 2–2 SCE)	
6	Estarreja	14	6	2	6	12	19	−7	28	Play-out
7	Grijó (R)	14	4	3	7	19	23	−4	26	Relegation to Distritais
8	Bustelo (R)	14	2	4	8	10	17	−7	23	Relegation to Distritais

Updated to match(es) played on 24 May 2014. Source:
Rules for classification: 1) points; 2) goal difference; 3) number of goals scored.
(R) Relegated
Notes:

Home \ Away	AND	BUS	CIN	EST	GRI	LSL	LVD	SCE
Anadia		3–1	0–0	1–2	1–1	0–0	2–0	1–3
Bustelo	0–1		1–3	2–0	0–2	0–0	1–1	0–0
Cinfães	2–0	1–0		1–2	1–2	1–0	2–1	4–1
Estarreja	0–1	0–3	1–0		1–3	2–1	1–0	2–2
Grijó	2–2	3–1	1–2	0–1		0–2	1–2	3–3
Lusitânia Lourosa	0–3	1–0	0–0	2–0	2–1		0–0	2–0
Lusitano Vildemoinhos	3–1	1–1	1–0	3–0	2–0	1–0		1–0
Sporting de Espinho	0–1	1–0	1–2	0–0	3–0	2–1	2–0	

Updated to match(es) played on 24 May 2014. Source:
Legend: Blue = home team win; Yellow = draw; Red = away team win.

==== Serie E ====
Pos	Team	Pld	W	D	L	GF	GA	GD	Pts	Relegation
1	Pampilhosa	14	9	1	4	29	19	+10	42	
2	Sourense	14	10	1	3	26	11	+15	40	
3	Nogueirense	14	5	5	4	22	11	+11	32 (Note: NOG 3–1 TOU; TOU 1–1 NOG)	
4	Tourizense	14	5	4	5	18	15	+3	32	
5	Naval 1º de Maio	14	6	4	4	21	22	−1	30	
6	Águias do Moradal (R)	14	5	4	5	26	30	−4	30 (Note: AGM 3–4 NAV; NAV 3–3 AGM)	Play-out
7	Carapinheirense (R)	14	2	5	7	10	21	−11	21	Relegation to Distritais
8	Manteigas (R)	14	1	2	11	10	33	−23	12	Relegation to Distritais

Updated to match(es) played on 24 May 2014. Source:
Rules for classification: 1) points; 2) goal difference; 3) number of goals scored.
(R) Relegated
Notes:

Home \ Away	AGM	CRP	MTG	NAV	NOG	PAM	SRS	TOU
Águias do Moradal		2–2	3–2	3–4	2–1	0–3	3–1	3–2
Carapinheirense	2–2		3–0	1–1	1–0	1–3	0–3	0–1
Manteigas	1–3	1–0		1–2	0–4	1–2	0–1	0–0
Naval 1º de Maio	3–3	0–0	1–0		1–1	3–1	1–0	0–2
Nogueirense	0–0	4–0	1–1	4–0		0–0	2–0	3–1
Pampilhosa	3–1	3–0	5–2	3–1	3–1		1–3	1–0
Sourense	3–0	1–0	5–1	3–2	1–0	2–0		2–0
Tourizense	3–1	0–0	2–0	0–2	1–1	3–1	1–1	

Updated to match(es) played on 24 May 2014. Source:
Legend: Blue = home team win; Yellow = draw; Red = away team win.

==== Serie F ====
Pos	Team	Pld	W	D	L	GF	GA	GD	Pts	Relegation
1	Caldas	14	7	4	3	17	11	+6	37	
2	Alcanenense	14	5	6	3	16	13	+3	36 (Note: SCT 2–2 ALC; ALC 1–1 SCT)	
3	Torreense	14	7	4	3	22	14	+8	36	
4	Fátima	14	5	4	5	12	11	+1	33	
5	Atlético Riachense	14	7	4	3	22	14	+8	29	
6	Lourinhanense (R)	14	3	6	5	11	16	−5	28	Play-out
7	Carregado (R)	14	4	3	7	16	21	−5	24	Relegation to Distritais
8	Portomosense (R)	14	1	3	10	5	21	−16	12	Relegation to Distritais

Updated to match(es) played on 24 May 2014. Source:
Rules for classification: 1) points; 2) goal difference; 3) number of goals scored.
(R) Relegated
Notes:

Home \ Away	ALC	ATR	CAL	CAR	FAT	LRN	PMS	SCT
Alcanenense		1–2	1–1	2–1	1–0	2–0	1–0	1–1
Atlético Riachense	0–0		1–2	6–2	0–0	1–0	3–0	1–3
Caldas	2–1	0–1		0–2	2–0	2–2	1–0	2–1
Carregado	1–0	1–2	0–1		0–2	1–1	2–2	2–2
Fátima	0–0	2–0	1–1	1–3		2–0	2–0	1–0
Lourinhanense	2–2	1–1	0–0	1–0	1–0		1–1	1–2
Portomosense	1–2	0–2	0–3	1–0	0–0	0–1		0–2
Torreense	2–2	2–2	1–0	0–1	3–1	2–0	1–0	

Updated to match(es) played on 24 May 2014. Source:
Legend: Blue = home team win; Yellow = draw; Red = away team win.

==== Serie G ====
Pos	Team	Pld	W	D	L	GF	GA	GD	Pts	Relegation
1	Casa Pia	14	7	6	1	20	6	+14	44	
2	Sintrense	14	5	7	2	23	15	+8	39 (Note: SNT 1–1 1ºD; 1ºD 2–2 SNT)	
3	1º de Dezembro	14	7	4	3	24	14	+10	39	
4	Operário	14	5	4	5	18	17	+1	37	
5	Praiense	14	6	4	4	27	21	+6	31	
6	Sporting Ideal (R)	14	5	4	5	17	19	−2	28	Play-out
7	O Elvas (R)	14	4	3	7	12	22	−10	20	Relegation to Distritais
8	Futebol Benfica (R)	14	1	0	13	15	42	−27	7	Relegation to Distritais

Updated to match(es) played on 24 May 2014. Source:
Rules for classification: 1) points; 2) goal difference; 3) number of goals scored.
(R) Relegated
Notes:

Home \ Away	1ºD	CPI	CFB	SCE	OPE	PRA	SNT	SCI
1º de Dezembro		0–0	3–0	2–1	3–0	3–0	2–2	2–0
Casa Pia	4–0		5–0	0–1	2–1	2–0	0–0	3–1
Futebol Benfica	2–5	0–1		1–2	1–4	2–5	2–4	3–1
O Elvas	0–1	1–1	2–1		0–1	2–0	1–1	1–1
Operário	3–1	1–1	3–1	3–0		1–1	0–0	0–0
Praiense	0–0	0–0	4–1	6–0	2–0		3–1	3–1
Sintrense	1–1	0–1	2–0	2–0	2–0	3–3		3–0
Sporting Ideal	1–0	0–0	1–0	2–1	2–1	5–0	2–2	

Updated to match(es) played on 24 May 2014. Source:
Legend: Blue = home team win; Yellow = draw; Red = away team win.

==== Serie H ====
Pos	Team	Pld	W	D	L	GF	GA	GD	Pts	Relegation
1	Moura	14	8	4	2	26	11	+15	44	
2	União de Montemor	14	6	7	1	21	14	+7	37 (Note: LOU 1–2 UNM; UNM 2–0 LOU)	
3	Louletano	14	7	5	2	22	12	+10	37	
4	Quarteirense	14	6	5	3	25	16	+9	35	
5	Cova da Piedade	14	5	3	6	23	25	−2	31	
6	Barreirense (R)	14	4	6	4	16	17	−1	28	Play-out
7	Esperança de Lagos (R)	14	2	3	9	10	30	−20	15	Relegation to Distritais
8	Almodôvar (R)	14	0	3	11	9	29	−20	10	Relegation to Distritais

Updated to match(es) played on 24 May 2014. Source:
Rules for classification: 1) points; 2) goal difference; 3) number of goals scored.
(R) Relegated
Notes:

Home \ Away	ALM	BAR	CVP	EPL	LOU	MAC	QUA	UNM
Almodôvar		1–2	0–0	3–3	0–2	0–2	0–1	0–1
Barreirense	3–0		2–1	0–0	1–1	1–2	1–0	2–2
Cova da Piedade	2–1	2–1		3–1	2–3	2–3	2–1	0–0
Esperança de Lagos	1–0	0–0	2–1		1–3	0–2	1–6	0–1
Louletano	2–0	0–0	3–0	3–1		1–0	2–2	1–2
Moura	5–0	5–1	1–2	1–0	0–0		1–1	3–2
Quarteirense	2–1	2–1	3–2	4–0	1–1	1–1		0–2
União de Montemor	3–3	1–1	3–3	1–0	2–0	0–0	1–1	

Updated to match(es) played on 24 May 2014. Source:
Legend: Blue = home team win; Yellow = draw; Red = away team win.

==== 6th places playouts ====
Team 1	Agg.	Team 2	1st leg	2nd leg
Camacha (C)	4–0	(F) Lourinhanense	1–0	3–0
Pedras Salgadas (A)	3–0	(H) Barreirense	2–0	1–0
Ribeirão (B)	4–1	(G) Sporting Ideal	3–0	1–1
Estarreja (D)	4–1	(E) Águias do Moradal	2–0	2–1
