= Luís Pedro =

Luís Pedro may refer to:

- Luís Pedro (footballer, born 1989), Portuguese footballer
- Luís Pedro (footballer, born 1990), Dutch footballer
- Luis Pedro (footballer, born 1992), Angolan footballer
- Luis Pedro (footballer, born 2002), Brazilian footballer
