= Emerson da Luz =

Cape Verdean footballer

Emerson
Personal information
- Full name: Emerson dos Santos da Luz
- Date of birth: 11 July 1982 (age 44)
- Place of birth: Mindelo, Cape Verde
- Height: 1.78 m (5 ft 10 in)
- Position: Midfielder

Youth career
- 2000: Portimonense
- 2001: Alvorense

Senior career*
Years	Team	Apps	(Gls)
2001–2002	Portimonense	6	(0)
2002–2003	Olhanense	24	(0)
2003–2005	Maia	48	(3)
2005–2006	Estrela da Amadora	22	(0)
2006–2008	Beira-Mar	41	(3)
2008	Gloria Bistriţa	3	(0)
2009	Beira-Mar	4	(0)
2009–2010	Arouca	17	(1)
2010–2012	Boavista	43	(2)
2012–2013	Vilaverdense	27	(1)
2013–2014	Ninense	19	(0)
2014–2015	Pasteleira		
2016	Ninense	9	(1)
2016–2017	Valadares Gaia	28	(1)
2017–2021	Canelas 2010		

International career
2002–2008	Cape Verde	27	(1)
- * Club domestic league appearances and goals

Emerson dos Santos da Luz (born 11 July 1982) is a Cape Verdean former professional footballer who played as a midfielder.

== Career ==
Emerson was born in Mindelo. He played a total of 37 games and scored 3 goals in the Portugal top division Primeira Liga while playing for Estrela da Amadora and Beira-Mar. His only experience outside Portugal is in the Romanian top division Liga I at Gloria Bistriţa.
