= Boscaini =

Boscaini is a surname, and may refer to:

- Diego Boscaini Zílio (born 1989), Brazilian footballer
- Paola Boscaini
- Pietro Boscaini (1947–1973), Italian swimmer
