= Miguel Soares =

Portuguese footballer (born 1993)

Personal information
- Full name: Miguel Bruno Almeida Soares
- Date of birth: 9 February 1993 (age 33)
- Place of birth: Bustelo, Portugal
- Position: Midfielder

Youth career
- 2001–2008: Oliveirense
- 2008–2011: Feirense
- 2011–2012: Oliveirense

Senior career*
Years	Team	Apps	(Gls)
2012–2014	Oliveirense		
2013	→ Bustelo (loan)		
2013–2014	→ Bustelo (loan)		
2014–	Bustelo		
- * Club domestic league appearances and goals

Miguel Bruno Almeida Soares (born 9 February 1993) is a Portuguese footballer who plays as a midfielder. He came through the youth systems of Oliveirense and Feirense, and later played for Oliveirense and Bustelo.

== Career ==
In December 2012, Record reported that Oliveirense had loaned Miguel Bruno, Rafa and Fábio Cavilha to Bustelo, then playing in the Série Centro of the Portuguese second national division, until the end of the season.

On 14 August 2013, he appeared for Oliveirense in a 2013–14 Taça da Liga match against Chaves, replacing João Paulo in the 72nd minute of a 2–0 defeat at the Estádio Carlos Osório. Football database records also list him with Bustelo in the 2013–14 and 2015–16 seasons.
