= Chidi Onyemah =

Nigerian footballer

Personal information
- Full name: Philip Chidi Onyemah
- Date of birth: 20 February 1984 (age 42)
- Place of birth: Lagos, Nigeria
- Height: 1.82 m (6 ft 0 in)
- Position: Forward

Team information
- Current team: Brito

Youth career
- 1997–2000: Delta United
- 2000–2002: Fornos Algodres
- 2002–2003: Porto

Senior career*
| Years | Team | Apps | (Gls) |
| 2003–2005 | Famalicão | | |
| 2005–2010 | Rio Ave | 140 | (18) |
| 2010–2013 | Olympiakos Nicosia | 79 | (20) |
| 2013 | Platanias | 4 | (0) |
| 2013–2014 | Ethnikos Achna | 35 | (12) |
| 2014 | Nea Salamina | 12 | (1) |
| 2015 | Famalicão | 12 | (1) |
| 2015–2016 | ENAD | 22 | (9) |
| 2016–2018 | Brito | 14 | (3) |
| 2018– | Ninense | 21 | (2) |
- * Club domestic league appearances and goals as of 24 May 2015

Philip Chidi Onyemah (born 20 February 1984) is a Nigerian professional footballer who plays for Portuguese club Ninense as a forward.

== Club career ==
Born in Lagos, Onyemah moved to Portugal still in his early teens, beginning his career with amateurs Associação Desportiva Fornos de Algodres. In 2002 he signed with FC Porto, where he finished his formation.

In the 2003 summer, Onyemah joined F.C. Famalicão, appearing in two fourth division seasons with the team and impressing enough to earn a move straight into the Primeira Liga with Rio Ave FC. He played 33 games in his first year (four goals), with the Vila do Conde side eventually being relegated.

Onyemah scored another four goals in 2007–08 to help Rio Ave return to the top level. In November 2008 he was on trial with Romania's FC Timişoara, but nothing came of it.

Onyemah appeared regularly for Rio Ave in the following two seasons – 28 starts combined – helping the club consecutive maintain its league status whilst contributing with three goals combined. In early July 2010 he moved to Olympiakos Nicosia of Cyprus, freshly promoted to the First Division.
