= André Vilas Boas =

Portuguese footballer (born 1983)

Personal information
- Full name: André Filipe Monteiro Vilas Boas
- Date of birth: 4 June 1983 (age 43)
- Place of birth: Vila do Conde, Portugal
- Height: 1.85 m (6 ft 1 in)
- Position: Defensive midfielder

Youth career
- 1992–2002: Rio Ave

Senior career*
Years	Team	Apps	(Gls)
2002–2010	Rio Ave	120	(1)
2003–2005	→ Porto B (loan)	41	(1)
2004	→ Porto (loan)	1	(0)
2010–2011	Marítimo	0	(0)
2010	Marítimo B	2	(0)
2011	→ Portimonense (loan)	4	(0)
2011–2017	Rio Ave	65	(1)
Total		233	(3)

International career
2003–2004	Portugal U20	5	(0)
- * Club domestic league appearances and goals

André Filipe Monteiro Vilas Boas (born 4 June 1983) is a Portuguese former professional footballer who played mainly as a defensive midfielder.

He spent 13 senior seasons with Rio Ave, having joined the club at the age of 9. He totalled 132 Primeira Liga matches, including one for Porto and four for Portimonense.

== Club career ==
Born in Vila do Conde, Vilas Boas spent his entire youth career with hometown club Rio Ave FC. He made his professional debut on 10 March 2002, playing the first 49 minutes of a 1–0 home loss against C.D. Nacional in the Segunda Liga.

On 29 July 2003, Vilas Boas joined FC Porto, being assigned to their reserves. He joined on a season-long loan with the option of a three-year permanent move at the end, and his one first-team appearance came on 10 January 2004 in a 2–0 Primeira Liga away victory over F.C. Paços de Ferreira, as a last-minute substitute for Maniche.

Vilas Boas returned to Rio Ave in 2005, with the side now in the top division. On 20 May 2010, he left on a free transfer to C.S. Marítimo, signing a two-year deal. He arrived injured, and his input was limited to the second team before he was loaned to Portimonense S.C. of the same league on 14 January 2011, for the rest of the campaign.

On 31 August 2011, Vilas Boas secured a deadline-day switch to his hometown club. He was part of the side in 2013–14 that lost the Taça de Portugal and Taça da Liga finals to S.L. Benfica, though he only played in the former and for two minutes. In the third round of that competition, away to C.F. Esperança de Lagos, he scored in a 3–0 win.

Vilas Boas scored his only top-tier goal on 29 August 2015, a last-minute equaliser in a 2–2 draw at Vitória de Setúbal. The following 21 June, he was awarded a one-year contract extension.

After retiring in June 2017 at the age of 34, Vilas Boas spent a year scouting for Rio Ave before becoming their sporting director. He resigned four years later following their relegation, and took up the same post at F.C. Famalicão in June 2021.

== Honours ==
Porto

- Primeira Liga: 2003–04

Rio Ave

- Taça de Portugal runner-up: 2013–14
- Taça da Liga runner-up: 2013–14
