= 2014 Taça de Portugal final =

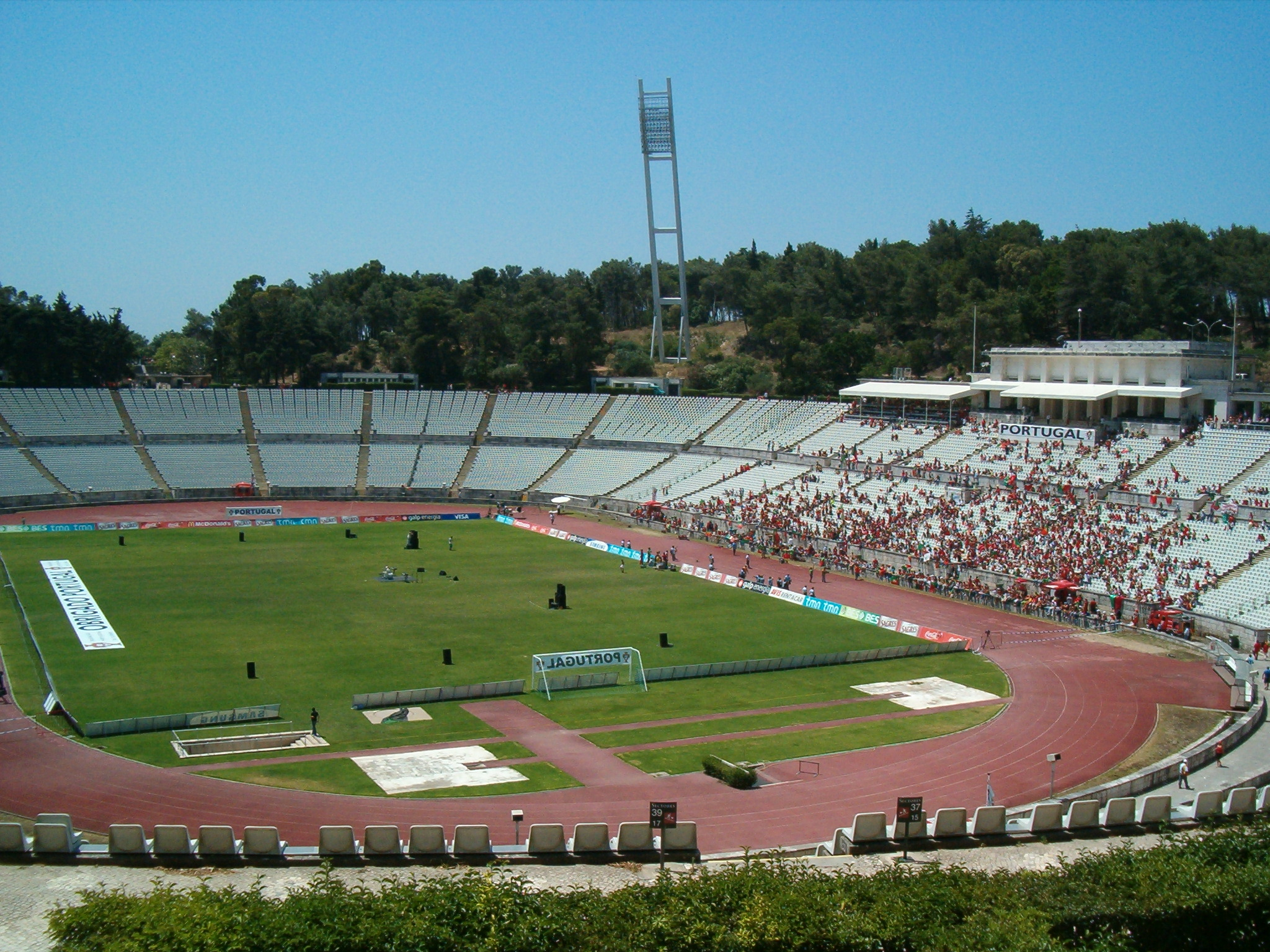
- Estádio Nacional
- Event: 2013–14 Taça de Portugal
Benfica	Rio Ave
1	0
- Date: 18 May 2014
- Venue: Estádio Nacional, Oeiras
- Man of the Match: Nicolás Gaitán (Benfica)
- Referee: Carlos Xistra (Castelo Branco)
- Attendance: 37,150
- Weather: Partly cloudy 25 °C (77 °F)

The 2014 Taça de Portugal final was the final match of the 2013–14 Taça de Portugal, the 74th season of the Taça de Portugal, the premier Portuguese football cup competition organized by the Portuguese Football Federation (FPF).

The final took place on 18 May 2014 at the Estádio Nacional in Oeiras. It was played between Benfica and Rio Ave, the two teams who also contested the 2014 Taça da Liga Final. Benfica won the Taça de Portugal for a record 25th time and made its 10th double (a record) and also an unprecedented treble by winning the Primeira Liga, Taça da Liga and Taça de Portugal.

Rio Ave qualified for the 2014–15 UEFA Europa League by reaching the final, as Benfica had already qualified for the Champions League via their Primeira Liga result. This was the last season in which cup runners-up qualify for the Europa League if the winner had already qualified for the Champions League. As Benfica won the 2013–14 Primeira Liga, Rio Ave played against them in the 2014 Supertaça Cândido de Oliveira as the Taça de Portugal representative.

== Match ==
=== Details ===
18 May 2014
17:00 WEST

Benfica	1–0	Rio Ave
Gaitán 20'

Estádio Nacional, Oeiras
Attendance: 37,150
Referee: Carlos Xistra (Castelo Branco)

Benfica	Rio Ave

GK	1	(Slovenia) Jan Oblak
RB	14	(Uruguay) Maxi Pereira
CB	4	(Brazil) Luisão (c)
CB	24	(Argentina) Ezequiel Garay
LB	34	(Portugal) André Almeida
RM	18	(Argentina) Eduardo Salvio
CM	6	(Portugal) Ruben Amorim		(substituted off) 55'
CM	35	(Argentina) Enzo Pérez
LM	20	(Argentina) Nicolás Gaitán		(substituted off) 87'
CF	11	(Brazil) Lima	(yellow card) 54'
CF	19	(Spain) Rodrigo		(substituted off) 66'
Substitutes:
GK	1	(Brazil) Artur
DF	33	(Brazil) Jardel
MF	30	(Portugal) André Gomes		(substituted on) 55'
MF	50	(Serbia) Lazar Marković		(substituted on) 66'
FW	90	(Portugal) Ivan Cavaleiro
FW	7	(Paraguay) Óscar Cardozo		(substituted on) 87'
FW	9	(Argentina) Rogelio Funes Mori
Manager:
(Portugal) Jorge Jesus

GK	93	(Brazil) Ederson
RB	12	(Brazil) Lionn	(red card) 90+4'
CB	46	(Brazil) Marcelo
CB	2	(Peru) Alberto Rodríguez
LB	26	(Brazil) Edimar	(yellow card) 90+4'
CM	8	(Portugal) Tarantini (c)
CM	7	(Brazil) Filipe Augusto
RM	17	(Portugal) Ukra
AM	77	(Portugal) Rúben Ribeiro	(yellow card) 45'	(substituted off) 78'
LM	23	(Portugal) Pedro Santos		(substituted off) 80'
CF	11	(Portugal) Bruno Braga	(yellow card) 57'	(substituted off) 89'
Substitutes:
GK	1	(Portugal) Hugo Ventura
DF	25	(Portugal) Roderick
DF	16	(Portugal) Nuno Lopes
MF	15	(Portugal) Tiago Pinto
MF	14	(Portugal) André Vilas Boas		(substituted on) 89'
MF	10	(Brazil) Diego Lopes		(substituted on) 78'
FW	9	(Egypt) Ahmed Hassan		(substituted on) 80'
Manager:
(Portugal) Nuno Espírito Santo

Man of the match

- (Argentina) Nicolás Gaitán (Benfica)

Match officials

- Assistant referees:
  - Jorge Cruz (Leiria)
  - Nélson Moniz (Madeira)
- Fourth official: Nuno Almeida (Algarve)

Match rules

- 90 minutes
- 30 minutes of extra-time if necessary
- Seven named substitutes
- Maximum of three substitutions

== See also ==
- 2013–14 S.L. Benfica season
- 2014 Taça da Liga final
