= Raúl Martins =

Portuguese footballer

Personal information
- Full name: Raúl André Freitas Martins
- Date of birth: 3 February 1987 (age 39)
- Place of birth: Porto, Portugal
- Height: 1.81 m (5 ft 11 1/2 in)
- Position: Defender

Team information
- Current team: UD Oliveirense
- Number: 70

Youth career
- 2000–2005: Salgueiros
- 2005–2006: Leixões

Senior career*
Years	Team	Apps	(Gls)
2006–2007	Praiense		
2007–2008	Oliveira do Hospital		
2008	Portosantense		
2009	Vila Meã		
2009–2010	Vizela		
2011	Gondomar		
2011	Kabuscorp		
2012–2013	Naval	13	(0)
2013	Académico de Viseu		
2013–2014	Atlético CP	7	(0)
2014–2016	Varzim	59	(0)
2016–	UD Oliveirense	9	(0)
- * Club domestic league appearances and goals as of 29 January 2017

Raúl André Freitas Martins (born 3 February 1987) is a Portuguese football player who plays for UD Oliveirense.

== Club career ==
He made his professional debut in the Segunda Liga for Naval on 23 September 2012 in a game against Tondela.
