= David Mbala =

Congolese professional footballer (born 1993)

Personal information
- Full name: David Nkumu Mbala
- Date of birth: 19 April 1993 (age 33)
- Place of birth: Kinshasa, Zaire
- Height: 1.75 m (5 ft 9 in)
- Position: Forward

Youth career
- 2011−2012: Penafiel

Senior career*
Years	Team	Apps	(Gls)
2012–2016	Penafiel	57	(7)
2016–2017	Boavista	3	(0)
2017–2018	Zaria Bălți	9	(1)

International career
2015–	DR Congo	1	(0)
- * Club domestic league appearances and goals as of 13 August 2018

David Nkumu Mbala (born 19 April 1993) is a Congolese professional footballer who plays as a forward.

== Football career ==
On 29 July 2012, Mbala made his professional debut with Penafiel in a 2012–13 Taça da Liga match against Feirense—when he started and played the full game. In the first match of the 2012–13 Segunda Liga season against Atlético on 12 August 2012, he scored his first professional goal (93rd minute) in his league debut. On 27 December 2016, Primeira Liga side Boavista announced the signing of the Congolese international player, reuniting him with Miguel Leal, his former coach at Penafiel who guided the team in their successful 2013-14 Segunda Liga campaign, which ended with the Penafiel side achieving promotion to Primeira Liga. He was there for 6 months and signed for Moldovan side Zaria Bălți, for whom he was with for 1 season.
