= Fábio Ervões =

Portuguese footballer (born 1987)

Personal information
- Full name: Fábio Miguel Amendoeira Ervões
- Date of birth: 26 February 1987 (age 39)
- Place of birth: Valpaços, Portugal
- Height: 1.88 m (6 ft 2 in)
- Position: Centre back

Youth career
- 1999–2000: Valpaços
- 2000–2002: Chaves
- 2002–2003: Padroense
- 2003–2006: Porto

Senior career*
Years	Team	Apps	(Gls)
2006–2008	Esmoriz	41	(1)
2008–2010	Covilhã	14	(0)
2010–2012	União Madeira	70	(1)
2012–2014	Penafiel	66	(1)
2014–2017	Boavista	7	(0)
2016–2017	→ Vizela (loan)	8	(0)
Total		206	(3)

International career
2003	Portugal U16	3	(0)
2005–2006	Portugal U19	7	(0)
- * Club domestic league appearances and goals

Fábio Miguel Amendoeira Ervões (born 26 February 1987) is a Portuguese former professional footballer who played as a centre back.

== Club career ==
Born in Valpaços, Vila Real District, Ervões played youth football for four clubs, including FC Porto from ages 16–19. He alternated between the second and third divisions in his first years as a senior, starting out at S.C. Esmoriz.

Ervões made his debut as a professional on 21 September 2008, coming on as a late substitute to help S.C. Covilhã to a 2–1 away win against U.D. Oliveirense. In summer 2012, he signed for fellow league club F.C. Penafiel. He was sent off in his first official appearance of the 2013–14 season, a 2–0 victory over Leixões S.C. in the domestic League Cup, but ended up contributing 30 league matches and one goal as the team returned to the Primeira Liga after a lengthy absence.
