= Piense S.C. =

Portuguese sports club

- Full name: Piense Sport Clube
- Founded: 1944
- League: I AF Beja
- 2020–21: league interrupted

Piense Sport Clube is a Portuguese sports club from Pias, Serpa.

The men's football team plays in the I league of AF Beja. The team previously played in the 1990–91 Terceira Divisão, as well as several editions of the Taça de Portugal in the 2010s.
