= Adesoji Adelaja =

Nigerian professor

Adesoji O. Adelaja (born February 20, 1956) is an economist and John A. Hannah Distinguished Professor in Land Policy at Michigan State University.

Born in Lagos in 1956, Adelaja attended Pennsylvania State University in the United States, where he received his B.S. and pursued graduate study at West Virginia University, receiving two M.S. degrees and his Ph.D. Upon completing his doctorate, Adelaja taught at Idaho State University for a year, then joined the faculty of Rutgers University in 1986, later becoming department chair of Agricultural, Food and Resource Economics, Director of the Ecopolicy Center, Director of the Food Policy Institute, Founder of the Food Innovation Center, Cook College Dean of Research, Dean of Cook College, and Executive Dean of Agriculture and Natural Resources. He became John A. Hannah Distinguished Professor in Land Policy at Michigan State University in 2004. In 2002, he was inducted into the Roll of Outstanding Alumnus at the College of Agriculture at the Pennsylvania State University. In 2018, the West Virginia University School of Business inducted Adelaja into its Roll of Distinguished Alumni.

== Early life and education ==
=== Education ===
==== Pennsylvania State University ====
Adelaja received his B.S. in Agricultural Mechanization in the class of 1978 at Pennsylvania State University.

==== West Virginia University ====
In 1980, Adelaja received his M.S. in Agricultural Economics from the Davis College of WVU. In 1981, he received his M.A. in Economics from the College of Business of WVU. In 1985, he received his PH.D. in Economics from the College of Business of WVU.

== Academic career ==
=== Idaho State University ===
In 1985, Adelaja joined the faculty at Idaho State University as an Assistant Professor in Economics. He served as an economic adviser to the Shoshone Bannock Native American tribe at the Fort Hall reservation. As an economic adviser he played a large part in increasing grazing revenues, defining their water rights and developing tribal enterprises and tax ordinances.

=== Rutgers University ===
In 1986, Adelaja joined the faculty as an Assistant Professor in the Department of Agricultural, Food and Resource Economics (AFRE) at Rutgers University. In 1993, he founded and served as the Director for the Rutgers Ecopolicy Center (ECOPOL). By 1996, he had been appointed Chair of AFRE. In 1997, he served as the Director for and founded the Rutgers Food Policy Institute. In 1999, he founded the Rutgers Food Innovation Center, a center that still serves the Southern New Jersey economy. He was appointed to many state boards and commissions as well as serving as an adviser to the offices of Governors McGreevey and Whitman. In 1999, Soji was appointed as the Dean of Research of the New Jersey Agricultural Experiment Station (NJAES). "After, he quickly rose to Dean of Cook College, Executive Director of the New Jersey Experiment Station (NJAES), and Executive Dean of Agriculture and Natural Resources." As the Executive Dean of Agriculture and Natural Resources, Soji oversaw Rutgers University's largest research unit and a massive college that included 21 extension offices, 18 centers and institutes, 14 departments and 10 research stations. He retired from Rutgers in 2004.

=== Michigan State University ===
In 2004, Adelaja joined the faculty at Michigan State University. In Michigan, he founded and served as Director of the Land Policy Institute and the Michigan Higher Education Land Policy Consortium.

== Personal life ==
Adelaja lives in West Palm Beach, Florida with his wife Frances Adelaja. He has three children.

== Awards and honors ==
"In recognition of his service at Rutgers, Soji received several Excellence in Research awards, an Excellence in Outreach awards, two Team Awards for Excellence, the Presidential Award for Distinguished Public Service, an Award from the New Jersey Legislature for outstanding contributions to the Garden State and a special recognition from Governor James McGreevey for his contribution to the development of the State of New Jersey. In 2004, Soji was honored as the George Hammell Cook Emeritus Executive Dean and Professor in recognition of his service to the university and the state.". At Michigan State University, he has received several awards, including the Distinguished Faculty Award in 2010. Adelaja is listed in Who's Who in America and among America's top educators by Marquis Who's Who.

== Corporate Governance ==
Soji has been on several corporate and philanthropic boards. He chairs the boards of Chapel Hill Denham Management Ltd (a leading investment bank in West Africa), Student Accomod8 Ltd (a real estate development company in Nigeria), and the Beneva Foundation (a Florida-based family foundation established in memory of his parents). He also chairs the Advisory Board of the Alliance for Modernizing African Agri-food Systems and the Africa Advisory Council of United Way Worldwide. He is on the board of directors of Trustfund Pensions Ltd, and on the Advisory Board of the Alliance for African Partnerships at Michigan State University. He served as a Global Fellow of the Woodrow Wilson International Center for Scholars in Washington, DC from 2018 to 2020.

== Recent Publications - 2018 to 2024 journal articles ==
1. R. Mukhopadhyay and A. Adelaja. “Predicting Acquirers of US Food and Agribusiness Firms” Agribusiness: An International Journal, November 29, 2023. https://doi.org/10.1002/agr.21876

2. A. Adelaja, J. George, T. Jayne, M. Muyanga, T. Awokuse, S. Liverpool-Tasie and A. Aromolaran. “Stepping-Up: Impacts of armed conflicts on land expansion”, Journal of Agricultural and Applied Economics, vol. 39, November 3, 2023, https://doi.org/10.1017/aae.2023.39.

3. S. Hiablie, D. Uyeh, A. Adelaja, K. Gebremedhin, A. Srivastava, K. Ileleji, M. Gitau, Y. Ha, T. Park. “An outlook on harnessing technological innovative competence in sustainably transforming African agriculture”, Global Challenges, Perspective, No. gch2.202300033R1, August 8, 2023, https://doi.org/10.1002/gch2.202300033.

4. T. Guedegbe, A. Adelaja and J. George. “Endogenous policy responses to COVID-19, resilience factors, and the impacts of the pandemic on farm performance”, World Development, vol. 158, April 6, 2023, 106254, https://doi.org/10.1016/j.worlddev.2023.106254

5. *L. S. Liverpool-Tasie, A. S. Nuhu, T. Awokuse, T. Jayne, M. Muyanga, A. Aromolaran and A. Adelaja. “Can medium-scale farms support smallholder commercialisation and improve welfare? Evidence from Nigeria”, Journal of Agricultural Economics, vol74, Issue 1, 48-74, Feb 2023, https://doi.org/10.1111/1477-9552.12487

6. *N. Sunday, R. Kahunde, B. Atwine, A. Adelaja & J. Kappiaruparampil. “How Specific Resilience Pillars Mitigate the Impact of Drought on Food Security: Evidence from Uganda”, Food Security, vol 15, issue 1, February 2023. https://doi.org/10.1007/s12571-022-01313-9

7. A. Aromolaran, A. Obayelu, M. Muyanga, T. Jayne, A. Adelaja, T. Awokuse, O. Ogunmola, and O. Osinowo. “Determinants of farmer’s decision to transit to medium/larger farm through expansion of land area under commercial tree crop plantation in Nigeria”. Forests, Trees, and Livelihoods”, vol. 31, Issue 4, 230-245, October 2, 2022, https://doi.org/10.1080/14728028.2022.2132541.

8. J. George and A. Adelaja. “Armed Conflicts, Forced Displacement and Food Security in Host Communities”, World Development, vol 158, October 2022, 105991. https://doi.org/10.1016/j.worlddev.2022.105991 https://doi.org/10.1016/j.worlddev.2022.105991.

9. M. Olabisi, R. Richardson and A. Adelaja. "The Next Global Crisis: Africa's Renewable Energy Financing Gap", Climate and Development. September 11, 2022. https://doi.org/10.1080/17565529.2022.2113022.

10. A. Adelaja and R. Mukhopadhyay. “Time-to-Completion for Mergers and Acquisitions in the Food and Agri-Business Industry” Agribusiness, An International Journal, Vol 38, Issue 3, January 2022, https://doi.org/10.1002/agr.21734.

11. J. George, A. Adelaja, O. Vaughan and T. Awokuse. “Explaining Transhumance-Related Violence: Fulani Ethnic Militia in Rural Nigeria”, Journal of Rural Studies, vol 89, 2022, January 2022, Pages 275-286, ISSN 0743-0167, https://doi.org/10.1016/j.jrurstud.2021.12.003.

12. A. Adelaja, J. George, L. Fox, K. Fuglie, and T. Jayne. “Shocks, Resilience and Structural Transformation in Sub-Saharan Africa” Sustainability, vol 13, issue 24, 13620, December 2021, https://doi.org/10.3390/su132413620.

13. A. Adelaja and J. George. “Food and Agricultural Security: An Introduction to the Special Issue”, Sustainability, vol 13, no (21), 12129; November 2021, https://doi.org/10.3390/su132112129.

14. J. George, A. Adelaja & T. Awokuse. “The agricultural impacts of armed conflicts: The case of Fulani Militia”, European Review of Agricultural Economics, Volume 48, Issue 3, July 2021, Pages 538–572, https://doi.org/10.1093/erae/jbaa022.

15. J. George and A. Adelaja. “Forced Displacement and Agriculture: Implications for Host Communities”, Sustainability, vol 13, no 5728, May 2021. https://doi.org/10.3390/su13105728

16. J. George, A. Adelaja, T. Awokuse and O. Vaughan. “Terrorist Attacks, Land Resource Competition and Violent Farmer-Herder Conflicts”, Land Use Policy, Vol 102, 10524, March 2021. https://doi.org/10.1016/j.landusepol.2020.105241

17. T. Miyahara and A. Adelaja. “Aging and Economic Growth in Japan: Differential Effects of Multiple Generations”, Journal of Population and Ageing, 2020, September 2020. https://doi.org/10.1007/s12062-020-09307-1.

18. T. Jayne, A. Adelaja & R. Mkandawire. “Africa’s Rapid Economic Transformation”, Welt Ohne Hunger, Vol 20, No. 30, One World, No Hunger, https://www.weltohnehunger.org/full-article/africas-transformation.html., December 2020.

19. A. Adelaja & J. George. “Is Youth Unemployment Related to Domestic Terrorism?”, Perspectives on Terrorism, Vol 14, Issue 5, October 2020.

20. A. Adelaja. “Barriers to National Renewable Energy Policy Adoption: Insights from a Case Study of Nigeria”, Energy Strategy Reviews, Vol 30, July 2020, https://doi.org/10.1016/j.esr.2020.100519

21. T. Jayne, A. Adelaja & R. Mkandawire. “Africa’s Rapid Economic Transformation”, Rural 21: The International Journal of Rural Development, Vol 54, No. 2/2020, May 2020, pp 14–17. https://www.rural21.com/english/archive/2020/02.html.

22. J. George, A. Adelaja & D. Weatherspoon. “Armed Conflict and Food Insecurity: Evidence from Boko Haram’s Attacks”, American Journal of Agricultural Economics, Vol 102, No. 1, January 2020, Published online, August 19. 2019, aaz039, https://doi.org/10.1093/ajae/aaz039.

23. A. Adelaja & J. George. “Terrorism and Land Use in Agriculture”, Land Use Policy, Volume 88, pp 104–116, November 2019, https://doi.org/10.1016/j.landusepol.2019.104116

24. A. Adelaja & J. George. “Grievances, Latent Anger and Unrest in Africa, African Security, Volume 12, Issue 1, 111-140, April 2019.

25. Adelaja & J. George. “Effects of Conflict on Agriculture: Evidence from the Boko Haram Insurgency”, World Development. Volume 117, 184-195, March 2019.

26. Adelaja, J. George, T. Miyahara & E. Tetteh. “Food Insecurity and Terrorism” Applied Economic Perspectives and Policy. 2018, Volume 45, pp 1–19, August 2018.

27. Adelaja & H. Akaeze. “Supply Response, Economic Diversification and Recovery Strategy in the Oil Sector”, Energy Strategy Reviews, Volume 21, pp 111–120, August 2018.

28. Adelaja, A. Labo & E. Penar. “Public Opinion on the Root Causes of Terrorism and Objectives of Terrorists: A Boko Haram Case Study” Perspectives on Terrorism, Vol 12, Issue 3, June 2018.
