= S.C. Alba =

Portuguese football club

Sport Clube Alba
- Nickname: Alba
- League: Terceira Divisão – Serie C
- Founded: 1941; 84 years ago
- Arena: Estádio Municipal, Portugal
- Capacity: N/A
- Team manager: N/A
- Website: http://www.scalba.pt/

Sport Clube Alba (aka Alba) is a Portuguese football team founded on 1 January 1941, located in Albergaria-a-Velha, district of Aveiro, and currently competing in the Terceira Divisão – Serie C. Sport Clube Alba won the Aveiro Football Association (AFA) Secondary Championship in 1961–1962, moving up to the Distrial 1st Division. The team hosts games at the Estádio Martins Pereira.

== History ==
Sport Clube Alba is a Portuguese sports club founded on 1 January 1941.

The club was the winner of the AFA Secondary Championship (football) in 1961–62, going up to the Distrital 1st Division. In the 1964–5 season it competed in the fourth series of the 3rd Division championship that was won by Águeda. In 1968/69 it won the distrital championship of the 1st division of Aveiro.

In the 1970s it competed 5 times (1971–72, 1974–75, 1975–76, 1976–77 and 1978–79) in the old Portuguese 2nd Division.

== Stadium ==
Estádio Municipal Doutor Mário Martins Pereira.

== Season to season ==
Season	Level	Division	Section	Place	Movements
1961–62	Tier 6	Distritais	AF Aveiro – 2ª Divisão	1st	Promoted
1962–63	Tier 5	Distritais	AF Aveiro – 1ª Divisão		
1968–69	Tier 5	Distritais	AF Aveiro – 1ª Divisão	1st	Promoted
1969–70	Tier 4	Terceira Divisão			
1979–80	Tier 4	Terceira Divisão			
1984–85	Tier 4	Terceira Divisão			
1992–93	Tier 4	Terceira Divisão	Série B	10th	
1994–95	Tier 5	Distritais	AF Aveiro – 1ª Divisão		
2006–07	Tier 5	Distritais	AF Aveiro – Honra	3rd	
2009–10	Tier 6	Distritais	AF Aveiro – 1ª Divisão		Promoted

== Honours ==
- Campeão 1ª Distrital de Aveiro:
  - 1968/69
- Campeão 1ª Distrital de Aveiro; Supertaça distrital (District Supercup):
  - 2009/10
- Campeão 2ª Distrital Associação de Futebol de Aveiro:
  - 1961/62

== Presidents ==
- Augusto Martins Pereira (1941–59)
- António Augusto Martins Pereira (1959–76)
- Lutero Letra da Costa (1976–80, 1st term)
- Mário Vidal da Silva (1980–81)
- António Rodrigues Parente (1981–84)
- João António Ferreira Resende Alves (1984–87)
- Rui Arvins Pereira Pinto (1987–89)
- Lutero Letra da Costa (1991–92, 2nd term)
- Fernando Pereira Pinto (1992–95)
- Manuel Conceição Neves (1995–2001)
- Abílio Costa (2001–07)
- Conceição Araújo (unknown)
- Carlos Coelho (since 2007)
- João Alves (aka "luvas pretas"), was born in Albergaria-a-Velha, on 5 December of 195. He was one of the most famous football players of his generation. He was also one of the presidents of the club during the 90s.

== Managers ==
- Couceiro Figueira
- Carlos Alves (coach)
- Valongo (Joaquim Freire)
- Virgílio Pereira
- Augusto Semedo
- Joaquim Queirós
- Quitó (Joaquim António Sousa)
- Óscar Mendes
