= A.D. Grijó =

Portuguese football club

Grijó
- Full name: Associação Desportiva de Grijó
- Founded: 1960; 65 years ago
- Ground: Estádio Municipal de Grijó; Grijó, Vila Nova de Gaia; Portugal
- Capacity: 500
- Chairman: Manuel Gomes
- League: Terceira Divisão Série B
Home colours

Associação Desportiva de Grijó (abbreviated as AD Grijó) is a Portuguese football club based in Grijó, Vila Nova de Gaia in the district of Porto.

== Background ==
AD Grijó currently plays in the Terceira Divisão Série B which is the fourth tier of Portuguese football. The club was founded in 1960 and they play their home matches at the Estádio Municipal de Grijó in Grijó, Vila Nova de Gaia. The stadium is able to accommodate 500 spectators.

The club is affiliated to Associação de Futebol do Porto and has competed in the AF Porto Taça. The club has also entered the national cup competition known as Taça de Portugal on a few occasions.

== Season to season ==
Season	Level	Division	Section	Place	Movements
1990–91	Tier 5	Distritais	AF Porto – 1ª Divisão 1		
1991–92	Tier 5	Distritais	AF Porto – 1ª Divisão 1		
1992–93	Tier 5	Distritais	AF Porto – Honra		Relegated
1993–94	Tier 6	Distritais	AF Porto – 1ª Divisão 1		Promoted
1994–95	Tier 5	Distritais	AF Porto – Honra		
1995–96	Tier 5	Distritais	AF Porto – Honra		Relegated
1996–97	Tier 6	Distritais	AF Porto – 1ª Divisão 2		
1997–98	Tier 6	Distritais	AF Porto – 1ª Divisão 2		
1998–99	Tier 6	Distritais	AF Porto – 1ª Divisão B		
1999–2000	Tier 6	Distritais	AF Porto – 1ª Divisão B		
2000–01	Tier 6	Distritais	AF Porto – 1ª Divisão B		
2001–02	Tier 6	Distritais	AF Porto – 1ª Divisão B		
2002–03	Tier 6	Distritais	AF Porto – 1ª Divisão 1		
2003–04	Tier 6	Distritais	AF Porto – 1ª Divisão 1	6th	
2004–05	Tier 6	Distritais	AF Porto – 1ª Divisão 1	2nd	Promoted
2005–06	Tier 5	Distritais	AF Porto – Honra	10th	
2006–07	Tier 5	Distritais	AF Porto – Honra	16th	Relegated
2007–08	Tier 6	Distritais	AF Porto – 1ª Divisão 1	1st	Promoted
2008–09	Tier 5	Distritais	AF Porto – Honra	6th	
2009–10	Tier 5	Distritais	AF Porto – Honra	5th	
2010–11	Tier 5	Distritais	AF Porto – Honra	2nd	Promoted
2011–12	Tier 4	Terceira Divisão	Série B – 1ª Fase	4th	Promotion Group
	Tier 4	Terceira Divisão	Série B Fase Final	6th	

== Honours ==
- AF Porto 1ª Divisão: 2007/08
