= Abraham Adelaja =

Nigerian footballer (born 1988)

Personal information
- Full name: Abraham Adelaja
- Date of birth: 31 January 1988 (age 38)
- Place of birth: Abuja, Nigeria
- Height: 1.97 m (6 ft 6 in)
- Position: Striker

Senior career*
Years	Team	Apps	(Gls)
2006–2008	Damash Gilan		
2008–2009	Esteghlal Jonub		
2009–2010	Mes Sarcheshme		
2010–2011	Machine Sazi		
2011–2012	Khánh Hòa	8	(4)
2013–2015	Farense	43	(9)
2015–2016	Mafra	26	(4)
2016–2017	Korabi	5	(0)
2017	Felgueiras 1932	5	(0)
2017–2018	Lusitano VRSA	14	(3)
2018–2019	União Madeira	13	(3)
2019	Fátima	12	(4)
2019–2020	Marinhense	8	(2)
- * Club domestic league appearances and goals as of 20:40, 30 August 2020 (UTC)

Abraham Adelaja (born 31 January 1988, Abuja) is a Nigerian professional footballer who plays as a striker.

== Club career ==
In July 2013, Adelaja arrived in Portugal to represent Farense. On 6 July 2015, he moved to fellow Segunda Liga club Mafra.

On 29 August 2016, Adelaja signed a contract with Albanian Superliga side Korabi Peshkopi as a free transfer. He was presented on the same day along with Nderim Nexhipi where he was allocated squad number 88.
