= Diego Zílio =

Brazilian footballer (born 1989)

Personal information
- Full name: Diego Boscaini Zílio
- Date of birth: 23 July 1989 (age 37)
- Place of birth: Garibaldi, Brazil
- Height: 1.81 m (5 ft 11 in)
- Position: Midfielder

Senior career*
| Years | Team | Apps | (Gls) |
| 2007–2010 | Alcanenense | | |
| 2010–2011 | Marítimo B | | |
| 2012–2013 | TSV Ottersberg | | |
| 2013–2014 | Alcanenense | 32 | (15) |
| 2014 | Santa Clara | 2 | (0) |
| 2015 | União de Leiria | 9 | (1) |
| 2015–2016 | Loures | 9 | (1) |
| 2016–2018 | Torreense | 70 | (11) |
| 2018–2019 | Peniche | 21 | (2) |
- * Club domestic league appearances and goals

Diego Boscaini Zílio (born 23 July 1989) is a Brazilian former professional footballer who played as a midfielder. He also holds Italian citizenship.

== Club career ==
Zílio made his professional debut in the Segunda Liga for Santa Clara on 9 August 2014 in a game against Oriental.
