= Luís Pedro (footballer, born 1989) =

Portuguese footballer

Personal information
- Full name: Luís Pedro Gomes Martins
- Date of birth: 23 June 1989 (age 37)
- Place of birth: Freamunde, Portugal
- Height: 1.88 m (6 ft 2 in)
- Position: Centre-back

Youth career
- 1997–2008: Freamunde

Senior career*
Years	Team	Apps	(Gls)
2008–2013	Freamunde	124	(2)
2013–2014	Portimonense	10	(1)
2014–2017	Freamunde	122	(5)
2017–2019	Penafiel	61	(4)
2019–2022	Varzim	50	(6)
2022–2023	Vitória Setúbal	5	(0)
2023	Anadia	13	(1)
2023–2024	Marco 09	8	(0)
2024	Pevidém	8	(0)
Total		401	(19)

International career
2009	Portugal U21	1	(1)
- * Club domestic league appearances and goals

Luís Pedro Gomes Martins (born 23 June 1989), known as Luís Pedro, is a Portuguese former professional footballer who played as a central defender.

He spent the vast majority of his 16-year senior career in the Segunda Liga, making over 350 appearances mainly in two spells with Freamunde, and also with Portimonense, Penafiel and Varzim.

== Club career ==
Born in Freamunde, Porto District, Luís Pedro started his career with local S.C. Freamunde. He spent six seasons with the club in the Segunda Liga, making his debut in the competition on 4 May 2008 in 2–4 home loss against C.D. Aves (21 minutes played).

In the summer of 2013, Luís Pedro was due to sign for C.D. Nacional of the Primeira Liga. His contract was terminated shortly after being told by manager Manuel Machado he was not part of his plans, and he stayed in the second division by joining Portimonense S.C. on a one-year deal. He totalled 13 games in his time on the Algarve, and scored to open a 1–1 home draw with C.D. Feirense on 29 December to keep his team in first place.

Luís Pedro went back to his hometown club in June 2014, on a one-year contract. He was an undisputed started during his second spell, then moved to F.C. Penafiel for the next two years.

After becoming a free agent in June 2019, the 30-year-old Luís Pedro switched to Varzim S.C. again in the second tier for the upcoming season. In late October, he was reported to be the active player with most overall appearances in the competition ahead of Jorge Pires.

== International career ==
Luís Pedro scored in his only appearance for the Portugal under-21 side, opening a 2–0 victory over Mozambique on 14 July 2009 in the Lusophony Games held in Amadora.
