= S.C. Bustelo =

Portuguese football club

Bustelo
- Full name: Sporting Clube de Bustelo
- Founded: 1922
- Ground: Quinta do Côvo; São Roque, Oliveira de Azeméis, Portugal
- Capacity: 600
- League: Terceira Divisão Série C
- Website: scbustelo.blogspot.co.uk
Home colours

Sporting Clube de Bustelo (abbreviated as SC Bustelo) is a Portuguese football club based in São Roque, Oliveira de Azeméis in the district of Aveiro.

== Background ==
SC Bustelo currently plays in the Terceira Divisão Série C which is the fourth tier of Portuguese football. The club was founded in 1922 and they play their home matches at the Quinta do Côvo in São Roque, Oliveira de Azeméis. The stadium is able to accommodate 600 spectators.

The club is affiliated to Associação de Futebol de Aveiro and has competed in the AF Aveiro Taça. The club has also entered the national cup competition known as Taça de Portugal on a few occasions.

== Season to season ==
Season	Level	Division	Section	Place	Movements
1990–91	Tier 6	Distritais	AF Aveiro – 1ª Divisão B Norte		Promoted
1991–92	Tier 5	Distritais	AF Aveiro – 1ª Divisão Norte		
1992–93	Tier 5	Distritais	AF Aveiro – Honra Norte		
1993–94	Tier 5	Distritais	AF Aveiro – Honra Norte		
1994–95	Tier 5	Distritais	AF Aveiro – Honra Norte		
1995–96	Tier 5	Distritais	AF Aveiro – Honra Norte		Relegated
1996–97	Tier 6	Distritais	AF Aveiro – 1ª Divisão B Norte		Promoted
1997–98	Tier 5	Distritais	AF Aveiro – Honra Norte	7th	
1998–99	Tier 5	Distritais	AF Aveiro – Honra Norte	12th	
1999–2000	Tier 5	Distritais	AF Aveiro – Honra Norte	8th	
2000–01	Tier 5	Distritais	AF Aveiro – Honra Norte	7th	
2001–02	Tier 5	Distritais	AF Aveiro – 1ª Divisão	13th	
2002–03	Tier 5	Distritais	AF Aveiro – 1ª Divisão	11th	
2003–04	Tier 5	Distritais	AF Aveiro – 1ª Divisão	8th	
2004–05	Tier 5	Distritais	AF Aveiro – 1ª Divisão	10th	
2005–06	Tier 5	Distritais	AF Aveiro – 1ª Divisão	16th	Relegated
2006–07	Tier 6	Distritais	AF Aveiro – 2ª Divisão Norte	3rd	
2007–08	Tier 6	Distritais	AF Aveiro – 2ª Divisão Norte	1st	Promoted
2008–09	Tier 5	Distritais	AF Aveiro – 1ª Divisão	5th	
2009–10	Tier 5	Distritais	AF Aveiro – 1ª Divisão	2nd	Promoted
2010–11	Tier 4	Terceira Divisão	Série C – 1ª Fase	6th	Promotion Group
2010–11	Tier 4	Terceira Divisão	Série C Fase Final	6th	
2011–12	Tier 4	Terceira Divisão	Série C – 1ª Fase	1st	Promotion Group
2011–12	Tier 4	Terceira Divisão	Série B Fase Final	2nd	Promoted
2012–13	Tier 3	Segunda Divisão	Zona Centro	14th	
2013–14	Tier 3	Camp. Portugal	Série D	10th	Relegated
2014–15	Tier 4	Distritais	AF Aveiro – 1ª Divisão	1st	Promoted
2015–16	Tier 3	Camp. Portugal	Série D		

== Honours ==
- AF Aveiro 1ª Divisão: 1976/77, 2014/15
- AF Aveiro 2ª Divisão: 1966/67, 2007/08
- AF Aveiro Taça: 2006/07, 2008/09
- AF Aveiro Supertaça: 2008/09
