= A.D. Ninense =

Portuguese football club

Ninense
- Full name: Associação Desportiva Ninense
- Founded: 1970
- Ground: Complexo Desportivo de Nine; Nine; Portugal
- Capacity: 1,500
- League: Campeonato Nacional de Seniores Série A

Associação Desportiva Ninense Futebol Clube (abbreviated as AD Ninense) is a Portuguese football club based in Nine in the district of Vila Nova de Famalicão.

== Background ==
Vilaverdense FC currently plays in the Campeonato Nacional de Seniores Série A which is the third tier of Portuguese football. The club was founded in 1970 and they play their home matches at the Complexo Desportivo de Nine in Nine. The stadium has a capacity to accommodate 1,500 spectators.

The club is affiliated to Associação de Futebol de Braga and has competed in the AF Braga Taça. The club entered the national cup competition known as Taça de Portugal for the first time in the 2013–14.

== Season to season ==
Season	Level	Division	Section	Place	Movements
2005–06	Tier 5	Distritais	AF Braga – Honra	3rd	
2006–07	Tier 5	Distritais	AF Braga – Honra	8th	Relegated
2007–08	Tier 6	Distritais	AF Braga – 1st Division	4th	
2008–09	Tier 6	Distritais	AF Braga – 1st Division	3rd	
2009–10	Tier 6	Distritais	AF Braga – 1st Division	2nd	Promoted
2010–11	Tier 5	Distritais	AF Braga – Honra	13th	Relegated
2011–12	Tier 6	Distritais	AF Braga – 1st Division	1st	Promoted
2012–13	Tier 5	Distritais	AF Braga – Honra	1st	Promoted
2013–14	Tier 3	Campeonato Nacional	Série A – 1st Phase		

== Current squad ==
Goalkeepers :

- (Portugal) João Rodrigues
- (Portugal) André Ferreira

Defense :

- (Portugal) André Correia
- (Portugal) Nuno Araújo
- (Portugal) China
- (Portugal) David
- (Portugal) Rui Torres
- (Portugal) Tiago Fernandes
- (Portugal) João Duarte
- (Portugal) Fábio Carvalho

Middle :

- (Portugal) César Marques
- (Portugal) Arturinho
- (Portugal) Cesário
- (Portugal) Hélder Guimarães
- (Portugal) Salgueiro

Forward :

- (Portugal) Luís Tiago
- (Portugal) Bruno Silva
- (Portugal) João Cruz
- (Portugal) Ruizinho
- (Portugal) Canetas
- (Portugal) Pedrinho

== Honours ==
- AF Braga Divisão de Honra: 2012–13
- AF Braga 1st Division: 2011–12
