= 2009–10 C.D. Nacional season =

Nacional
2009–10 season
- President: Rui Alves
- Manager: Manuel Machado (until 29 November); Predrag Jokanović (caretaker, from 29 November to 26 January); Manuel Machado (from 26 January)
- Stadium: Estádio da Madeira
- Primeira Liga: 7th
- Taça de Portugal: Fifth round
- Taça da Liga: Third round
- UEFA Europa League: Group stage
Home colours

The 2009–10 season was Clube Desportivo Nacional's 8th consecutive season in the Primeira Liga and 99th year in existence as a football club. In addition to the domestic league, Nacional participated in this season's editions of the Taça de Portugal, Taça da Liga and UEFA Europa League.

== Squad ==
Note: Flags indicate national team as defined under FIFA eligibility rules; some limited exceptions apply. Players may hold more than one non-FIFA nationality.

No.	Pos.	Nation	Player
1	GK	BRA	Rafael Bracali
2	DF	POR	Bruno Patacas
3	DF	BRA	Felipe Lopes
4	DF	ALG	Rafik Halliche
6	MF	POR	Cléber
8	MF	POR	Luís Alberto
10	MF	SLO	Nejc Pečnik
11	FW	NGR	Kevin Amuneke
12	GK	CMR	Douglas Pajetat
16	FW	CRO	Kristijan Pavlović
17	FW	POR	Edgar Costa
19	FW	BRA	Diego Barcelos
20	MF	SEN	Abdou Guirassy

No.	Pos.	Nation	Player
22	DF	ANG	Marco Airosa
23	MF	POR	João Aurélio
24	GK	BRA	Elisson Aparecido Rosa
25	MF	SRB	Ivan Todorović
27	MF	POR	Pedro Pacheco
29	FW	BRA	Rodrigo Silva
30	MF	BRA	Leandro Salino
31	FW	ANG	Mateus
33	DF	MNE	Žarko Tomašević
34	DF	BRA	Alex Bruno
55	DF	POR	Nuno Pinto
77	FW	BRA	Thiago Gentil
99	FW	BRA	Pedro Oldoni

== Competitions ==
=== Overview ===
Competition	First match	Last match	Starting round	Final position	Record							
Competition	First match	Last match	Starting round	Final position	Pld	W	D	L	GF	GA	GD	Win %
Primeira Liga	15 August 2009	9 May 2010	Matchday 1	7th	30	10	9	11	36	46	−10	33.33
Taça de Portugal	17 October 2009	20 January 2010	Third round	Fifth round	3	1	1	1	3	3	+0	33.33
Taça da Liga	3 January 2010	24 January 2010	Third round	Third round	3	1	1	1	2	2	+0	33.33
UEFA Europa League	20 August 2009	16 December 2009	Play-off round	Group stage	8	2	3	3	16	16	+0	25.00
Total					44	14	14	16	57	67	−10	31.82

Source: Competitions

=== Primeira Liga ===
==== League table ====
Pos	Team	Pld	W	D	L	GF	GA	GD	Pts	Qualification or relegation
5	Marítimo	30	11	8	11	42	43	−1	41 (Note: Marítimo ahead of Vitória de Guimarães on head-to-head record; Vitória de Guimarães–Marítimo 1–2, Marítimo–Vitória de Guimarães 0–1.)	Qualification to Europa League second qualifying round
6	Vitória de Guimarães	30	11	8	11	31	34	−3	41	
7	Nacional	30	10	9	11	36	46	−10	39	
8	Naval 1º de Maio	30	10	6	14	20	35	−15	36	
9	União de Leiria	30	9	8	13	35	41	−6	35 (Note: União de Leiria ahead of Paços de Ferreira on head-to-head record; Paços de Ferreira–União de Leiria 0–1, União de Leiria–Paços de Ferreira 2–1.)	

Source: LPFP
Rules for classification: 1) points; 2) head-to-head points; 3) head-to-head goal difference; 4) head-to-head goals scored; 5) goal difference; 6) number of goals scored.

==== Results summary ====
Overall								Home						Away					
Pld	W	D	L	GF	GA	GD	Pts	W	D	L	GF	GA	GD	W	D	L	GF	GA	GD
30	10	9	11	36	46	−10	39	7	6	2	20	16	+4	3	3	9	16	30	−14

Source: Competitions

==== Matches ====
15 August 2009 1	Nacional	1–1	Sporting CP	Funchal
19:15 WEST (UTC+1)	Aurélio 27'	Report	Aurélio 75' (o.g.)	Stadium: Estádio da Madeira; Referee: Pedro Proença

23 August 2009 2	Porto	3–0	Nacional	Porto
20:15 WEST (UTC+1)	Meireles (yellow card) 21'; Falcao 68' (pen.); Rolando 78'; Rodríguez 86'	Report	Cléber (yellow card) 40' (yellow-red card) 64'; Cléber Monteiro (red card) 64'; Patacas (yellow card) 65'	Stadium: Estádio do Dragão; Referee: João Lopes Ferreira

31 August 2009 3	Nacional	1–1	Olhanense	Funchal
19:00 WEST (UTC+1)	Aurélio 58'	Report	Fernandes 78'	Stadium: Estádio da Madeira; Referee: Hugo Miguel

12 September 2009 4	Rio Ave	2–0	Nacional	Vila do Conde
18:00 WEST (UTC+1)	Tomás 33'; V. Gomes 63'	Report		Stadium: Estádio dos Arcos; Referee: Pedro Proença

20 September 2009 5	Nacional	2–1	Marítimo	Funchal
18:00 WEST (UTC+1)	Edgar 36', 77'; Micael (yellow card) 41'; Alberto (red card) 45'; Bracali (yellow card) 88'	Report	Djalma 56'; Roberto (yellow card) 90'	Stadium: Estádio da Madeira; Referee: Paolo Costa (Italy)

5 October 2009 7	Nacional	2–0	Vitória de Guimarães	Funchal
18:00 WEST (UTC+1)	Edgar 8', 24'	Report		Stadium: Estádio da Madeira; Referee: Bruno Paixão

12 October 2009 6	Belenenses	0–1	Nacional	Lisbon
20:15 WEST (UTC+1)		Report	Anselmo 28'	Stadium: Estádio do Restelo; Referee: Cosme Cunha Machado

26 October 2009 8	Benfica	6–1	Nacional	Lisbon
20:15 WET (UTC)	Cardozo 17', 48' (pen.), 90' (pen.); Saviola 40', 64'; N. Gomes 86'	Report	Costa 27'	Stadium: Estádio da Luz; Referee: Vasco Santos

1 November 2009 9	Nacional	2–1	Vitória de Setúbal	Funchal
18:00 WET (UTC)	Pečnik 45'; Anselmo 85'	Report	Keita 11'	Stadium: Estádio da Madeira; Referee: Rui Costa

8 November 2009 10	Leixões	2–4	Nacional	Matosinhos
16:00 WET (UTC)	Pouga 17'; Morais 85' (pen.)	Report	Edgar 19' (pen.), 30' (pen.), 75'; Anselmo 90'	Stadium: Estádio do Mar; Referee: João Capela

28 November 2009 11	Nacional	1–1	Naval 1º de Maio	Funchal
17:00 WET (UTC)	Mateus 90'	Report	Camora 45'	Stadium: Estádio da Madeira; Referee: Jorge Joaquim Martins de Barros Tavares

7 December 2009 12	União de Leiria	1–2	Nacional	Leiria
20:15 WET (UTC)	Pateiro 47'	Report	Edgar 17'; Lopes 81'	Stadium: Estádio Dr. Magalhães Pessoa; Referee: Bruno Paixão

11 December 2009 13	Paços de Ferreira	2–1	Nacional	Paços de Ferreira
20:15 WET (UTC)	William 41', 61'	Report	Amuneke 53'	Stadium: Estádio da Mata Real; Referee: João Francisco Lopes

20 December 2009 14	Nacional	4–3	Académica	Funchal
16:30 WET (UTC)	Mateus 4'; Micael 35'; Edgar 51'; Amuneke 64'	Report	Tiero 9'; Sougou 57'; Fidalgo 76'	Stadium: Estádio da Madeira; Referee: Paulo Manuel Gomes Costa

8 January 2010 15	Braga	2–0	Nacional	Braga
20:15 WET (UTC)	Vandinho 3'; Leone 55'	Report		Stadium: Estádio Municipal de Braga; Referee: Artur Soares Dias

16 January 2010 16	Sporting CP	3–2	Nacional	Lisbon
21:15 WET (UTC)	Veloso 25'; Liédson 59', 72'	Report	Micael 24'; Edgar 83'	Stadium: Estádio José Alvalade; Referee: Bruno Paixão

30 January 2010 17	Nacional	0–4	Porto	Funchal
17:00 WET (UTC)	Alex Bruno (yellow card) 9' (yellow-red card) 28'; Pinto (yellow card) 52'; Luís Alberto (yellow card) 76'; Patacas (yellow card) 77'	Report	Varela 31' (pen.), 86'; Falcao 45', 62'; González (yellow card) 54'; Fernando (yellow card) 68'	Stadium: Estádio da Madeira; Referee: Carlos Xistra

7 February 2010 18	Olhanense	1–0	Nacional	Olhão
15:00 WET (UTC)	Toy 90'	Report		Stadium: Estádio José Arcanjo; Referee: Duarte Gomes

14 February 2010 19	Nacional	1–1	Rio Ave	Funchal
16:00 WET (UTC)	Oldoni 56'	Report	Wíres 60'	Stadium: Estádio da Madeira; Referee: Hugo Pacheco

19 February 2010 20	Marítimo	1–1	Nacional	Funchal
20:15 WET (UTC)	Pitbull (yellow card) 28'; Jorge (yellow card) 30'; Kléber 34'; Guilherme (yellow card) 72'	Report	Salino (yellow card) 27'; Lopes 74'; Aurélio (yellow card) 81'; Oldoni (yellow card) 90'	Stadium: Estádio do Marítimo; Referee: Artur Soares Dias

2 March 2010 21	Nacional	1–0	Belenenses	Funchal
15:00 WET (UTC)	Aurélio 26'	Report		Stadium: Estádio da Madeira; Referee: Luís Reforço

8 March 2010 22	Vitória de Guimarães	2–0	Nacional	Guimarães
20:15 WET (UTC)	Roberto 7'; Desmarets 36'	Report		Stadium: Estádio D. Afonso Henriques; Referee: Paulo Manuel Gomes Costa

14 March 2010 23	Nacional	0–1	Benfica	Funchal
18:00 WET (UTC)		Report	Cardozo 64'	Stadium: Estádio da Madeira; Referee: Paulo Baptista

28 March 2010 24	Vitória de Setúbal	2–1	Nacional	Setúbal
16:00 WEST (UTC+1)	Neca 53'; Keita 90' (pen.)	Report	Pečnik 9'	Stadium: Estádio do Bonfim; Referee: Olegário Benquerença

2 April 2010 25	Nacional	1–0	Leixões	Funchal
19:00 WEST (UTC+1)	Costa 46'	Report		Stadium: Estádio da Madeira; Referee: Pedro Jorge Carvalheiro Henriques

9 April 2010 26	Naval 1º de Maio	0–0	Nacional	Figueira da Foz
20:15 WEST (UTC+1)	Godemèche (yellow card) 25'; Marinho (yellow card) 34'	Report	Cléber (yellow card) 40'	Stadium: Estádio Municipal José Bento Pessoa; Referee: Lucílio Cardoso Cortez Batista

18 April 2010 27	Nacional	2–0	União de Leiria	Funchal
16:00 WEST (UTC+1)	Oldoni 20'; Barcelos 57'	Report		Stadium: Estádio da Madeira; Referee: Rui Costa

25 April 2010 28	Nacional	1–1	Paços de Ferreira	Funchal
16:00 WEST (UTC+1)	Barcelos 29'	Report	Maykon 88'	Stadium: Estádio da Madeira; Referee: Bruno Esteves

2 May 2010 29	Académica	3–3	Nacional	Coimbra
20:15 WEST (UTC+1)	Cabral 7'; Fidalgo 74'; Eder 76'	Report	Barcelos 1'; Edgar 41'; Aurélio 90'	Stadium: Estádio Cidade de Coimbra; Referee: João Capela

9 May 2010 30	Nacional	1–1	Braga	Funchal
18:00 WEST (UTC+1)	Edgar 50'; Gentil (yellow card) 80'	Report	Rentería 56'; Moura (yellow card) 80'	Stadium: Estádio da Madeira; Referee: Carlos Xistra

=== Taça de Portugal ===
17 October 2009 Third round	Varzim	1–2	Nacional	Póvoa de Varzim
18:00 WEST (UTC+1)		Report		Stadium: Estádio do Varzim SC

22 November 2009 Fourth round	Nacional	0–0 (a.e.t.) (4–3 p)	Fátima	Funchal
16:00 WET (UTC)		Report		Stadium: Estádio da Madeira
Note: Nacional won 4–3 on penalties.

20 January 2010 Fifth round	Nacional	1–2	Paços de Ferreira	Funchal
16:00 WET (UTC)	Salino 81'	Report	Maykon 47'; Pizzi 86'	Stadium: Estádio da Madeira; Referee: Paulo Baptista

=== Taça de Liga ===
==== Third round ====
Pos	Team	Pld	W	D	L	GF	GA	GD	Pts	Qualification
1	Benfica	3	2	1	0	4	2	+2	7	Advance to knockout phase
2	Rio Ave	3	1	1	1	4	4	0	4	
3	Nacional	3	1	1	1	2	2	0	4	
4	Vitória de Guimarães	3	0	1	2	2	4	−2	1	

3 January 2010 1	Benfica	1–0	Nacional	Lisbon
18:15 WET (UTC)	Saviola 79'	Report		Stadium: Estádio da Luz

13 January 2010 2	Rio Ave	1–1	Nacional	Vila do Conde
17:30 WET (UTC)	Tomás 21' (pen.)	Report	Da Costa 15'	Stadium: Estádio dos Arcos

24 January 2010 3	Nacional	1–0	Vitória de Guimarães	Funchal
20:15 WET (UTC)	Mineiro 54'	Report		Stadium: Estádio da Madeira

=== UEFA Europa League ===
==== Play-off round ====
20 August 2009 First leg	Nacional (Portugal)	4–3	(Russia) Zenit Saint Petersburg	Funchal, Portugal
20:30 WEST (UTC+1)	Alberto 30', (yellow card) 66'; Cléber (yellow card) 35'; Aurélio 37', (yellow card) 38'; Silva 53'; Patacas (yellow card) 55'; Micael 73'	Report	Anyukov (yellow card) 21'; Shirokov (yellow card) 35'; Semshov 43', 55'; Meira (yellow card) 79'; Tekke 90+3'	Stadium: Estádio da Madeira; Attendance: 3,000; Referee: Cüneyt Çakır (Turkey)

27 August 2009 Second leg	Zenit Saint Petersburg (Russia)	1–1 (4–5 agg.)	(Portugal) Nacional	Saint Petersburg, Russia
20:30 MSK (UTC+4)	Tekke 34'; Huszti (yellow card) 66'; Zyryanov (yellow card) 77'; Križanac (yellow card) 80'; Kim (yellow card) 90+4'	Report	Micael (yellow card) 14', (goal) 89'; Pinto (yellow card) 63'; Lopes (yellow card) 66'; Patacas (yellow card) 76'	Stadium: Petrovsky Stadium; Attendance: 19,500; Referee: Ivan Bebek (Croatia)
Note: Nacional won 5–4 on aggregate.

==== Group stage ====
Pos	Team	Pld	W	D	L	GF	GA	GD	Pts	Qualification	BRM	ATH	NCL	AUS
1	(Germany) Werder Bremen	6	5	1	0	17	6	+11	16	Advance to knockout phase	—	3–1	4–1	2–0
2	(Spain) Athletic Bilbao	6	3	1	2	10	8	+2	10	Advance to knockout phase	0–3	—	2–1	3–0
3	(Portugal) Nacional	6	1	2	3	11	12	−1	5		2–3	1–1	—	5–1
4	Austria Wien	6	0	2	4	4	16	−12	2		2–2	0–3	1–1	—

Source: Soccerway

17 September 2009 1	Nacional (Portugal)	2–3	(Germany) Werder Bremen	Funchal, Portugal
20:05 WEST (UTC+1)	Lopes 68'; Halliche 75'	Report	Boenisch (yellow card) 8'; Frings 39' (pen.); Pizarro 55', 85'; Bargfrede (yellow card) 80'	Stadium: Estádio da Madeira; Attendance: 3,082; Referee: Svein Oddvar Moen (Norway)

1 October 2009 2	Austria Wien	1–1	(Portugal) Nacional	Vienna, Austria
19:00 CEST (UTC+2)	Diabang (yellow card) 2'; Ačimovič (penalty missed) 10'; Standfest (yellow card) 50'; Schumacher 76'; Sulimani (yellow card) 84'	Report	Mateus (yellow card) 6'; Micael 35'; Edgar (yellow card) 35'; Halliche (yellow card) 45+1'; Lopes (yellow card) 53'; Salino (yellow card) 87'	Stadium: Franz Horr Stadium; Attendance: 11,000; Referee: Tony Chapron (France)

22 October 2009 3	Athletic Bilbao (Spain)	2–1	(Portugal) Nacional	Bilbao, Spain
19:00 CEST (UTC+2)	Ustaritz (yellow card) 55'; Etxeberria 67'; Llorente 86'	Report	Patacas (yellow card) 38'; Micael 42'; Alberto (yellow card) 65'; Cléber (yellow card) 69'	Stadium: San Mamés Stadium; Attendance: 24,569; Referee: István Vad (Hungary)

5 November 2009 4	Nacional (Portugal)	1–1	(Spain) Athletic Bilbao	Funchal, Portugal
20:05 WET (UTC)	Pečnik (yellow card) 30'; Pinto (yellow card) 39' (yellow-red card) 79'; Edgar (yellow card) 45', (goal) 64' (pen.); Cléber (yellow card) 77'	Report	Martínez (yellow card) 58'; Iraizoz (yellow card) 62'; Gurpegui (yellow card) 78'; Etxeberria 85' (pen.), (yellow card) 90+2'	Stadium: Estádio da Madeira; Attendance: 2,945; Referee: William Collum (Scotland)

3 December 2009 5	Werder Bremen (Germany)	4–1	(Portugal) Nacional	Bremen, Germany
19:00 CET (UTC+1)	Rosenberg 31', 34'; Mielitz (yellow card) 60'; Jensen (yellow card) 79'; Moreno 84'; Marin 90+2'	Report	Tomašević (yellow card) 28'; Micael (yellow card) 61'; Cléber (yellow card) 83'	Stadium: Weserstadion; Attendance: 23,784; Referee: Alon Yefet (Israel)

16 December 2009 6	Nacional (Portugal)	5–1	Austria Wien	Funchal, Portugal
20:05 WET (UTC)	Micael 23', 57'; Mateus 32'; Tomašević 61'; Lopes 66'	Report	Schumacher 21'; Baumgartlinger (yellow card) 65'; Bąk (yellow card) 77'	Stadium: Estádio da Madeira; Attendance: 1,368; Referee: Costas Kapitanis (Cyprus)
