= List of C.R. Caála players =

Clube Recreativo da Caála is an Angolan football (soccer) club based in Caála, Huambo, Angola and plays at Estádio Mártires da Canhala. The club was established in 1944.

== 2020–2021 ==
C.R. Caála players 2020–2021

Nat	#	Nick	Name	A	P	Dudú Leite			Total Apps & Gls		
Nat	#	Nick	Name	A	P	2020–21			Total Apps & Gls		
Nat	#	Nick	Name	A	P	^{#}	^{A}	^{G}	^{S}	^{A}	^{G}
(Angola)	4	Adilson Manuel	Adilson Joaquim Manuel	31	DF	4	^{25(1)}	^{0}			
(Angola)	30	Anselmo Mweni	Anselmo Mbala Mweni	22	GK	30	^{2}	^{0}			
(Angola)	26	Ayson	Arilson de Ceita Pereira Jorge	21	MF	26	^{22(3)}	^{1}			
(Angola)	12	Beny Tchissingui	Teodoro Edvaldo Rita Tchissingui	20	GK	12	^{24}	^{0}			
(Angola)	24	Careca	Nanizawo Jacques António	31	FW	24	^{1(3)}	^{1}			
(Angola)	16	Chitanga	Francisco Vieira Chitanga	23	DF	16	^{18(6)}	^{0}			
(Angola)	9	Deco Calepi	Moisés Alberto Calepi	24	FW	9	^{15(2)}	^{6}			
(Angola)	29	Depú	Laurindo Dilson Maria Aurélio	20	FW	29	^{25(1)}	^{11}			
(Angola)	27	Filipe Tchitungo	Filipe Tomás João Tchitungo	23	DF	27	^{26(2)}	^{1}			
(Angola)	1	Geovani Carvalho	Geovani Raimundo de Carvalho	18	GK	1	^{5}	^{0}			
(Angola)	3	Gervinho	Gervinho M. Mateus	23	DF	3	^{13}	^{0}			
(Angola)	10	Gildo Seteco	Hermenegildo João Seteco	31	FW	10	^{11(3)}	^{1}			
(Angola)	5	Jó Simão	João Milagre Chiva Simão	22	DF	5	^{30}	^{4}			
(Angola)	11	Joca Cassicote	João Baptista Cassicote	24	FW	11	^{4(7)}	^{0}			
(Angola)	25	Lúcio Capoco	Ediberto Lúcio Capoco	21	MF	25	^{7(5)}	^{0}			
(Angola)	19	Malamba Sahandas	António Malamba Sahandas	21	FW	19	^{7(22)}	^{1}			
(Angola)	8	Manelito	Manuel Paulo			8	^{0}	^{0}			
(Angola)	20	Maninho António	Adelino Wima Calunhi António	24	FW	20	^{21(1)}	^{0}			
(Angola)	23	Miguel, Pedro	Pedro Miguel	29	MF	23	^{1(8)}	^{0}			
(Angola)	13	Milambo Mendes	Ndanda Ricardo Mendes	25	DF	13	^{16(1)}	^{0}			
(Angola)	28	Moco	Bruno Baptista Tolombua Fernando	29	FW	28	^{8(6)}	^{3}			
(Angola)	35	Ngola	Sebastião Ngola	16	MF	35	^{2(3)}	^{0}			
(Angola)	7	Nilton Monteiro	Domingos Nílton Monteiro	25	MF	7	^{16(4)}	^{2}			
(Angola)	15	Pedro Djuma	Mundayi Pedro	26	FW	15	^{4(7)}	^{1}			
(Angola)	6	Pedro Kiaku	Pedro Kiaku	21	FW	6	^{1(4)}	^{0}			
(Angola)	21	Putchú	Gonçalves Manico	24	MF	21	^{1(2)}	^{0}			
(Angola)	14	Rafa	Rafael José	22	FW	14	^{(5)}	^{0}			
(Angola)	32	Salvador, José	José Salvador		DF	32	^{13}	^{0}			
(Angola)	2	Tavares Carvalho	Tavares Carvalho	20	DF	2	^{4(1)}	^{0}			
(Angola)	17	Tchitchi	Cláudio Segunda Adão	34	MF	17	^{13(8)}	^{0}			
(Angola)	–	Vanilson			MF	–	^{1}	^{0}			
(Angola)	18	Vitinho	Daniel Xavier	24	FW	18	^{2}	^{0}			
Years						2020–21					

== 2011–2020 ==
C.R. Caála players 2011–2020

Nat	Nick	Name	A	P	–	F.P.	V.P.	F.P.	J.A.	A.C.	David Dias			David Dias						David Dias			Total Apps & Gls			
Nat	Nick	Name	A	P	2011	2012	2013	2014	2015	2016	2017 (8th)			2018 (12th)			2018–19			2019–20			Total Apps & Gls			
Nat	Nick	Name	A	P	5	10	11	7	11	11	^{#}	^{A}	^{G}	^{#}	^{A}	^{G}	^{#}	^{A}	^{G}	^{#}	^{A}	^{G}	^{S}	^{A}	^{G}	
(Angola)	Adilson Manuel	Adilson Joaquim Manuel	–	DF			→	4	4	4	4	^{22}	^{0}	4	^{24}	^{0}	4	^{24(2)}	^{0}	4	^{13(1)}	^{0}	↑			
(Angola)	Aires	Ludgero Aires Cachicote da Rocha	25	DF			→	16																		
(Senegal)	Alioune Gueye	Alioune Gueye	28	MF	7	7	7	7	7																	
(Democratic Republic of the Congo)	Amuri	Amuri Kasali	26	GK				→	30																	
(Brazil)	André Jesus	Carlos André Santos de Jesus	27	DF				5	→																	
(Angola)	Anselmo	Anselmo Mbala Mweni	–	GK																30	^{6}	^{0}	↑			
(Democratic Republic of the Congo)	Apataki	Patrick Kifu Apataki	29	FW					21																	
(Angola)	Ayson	Arilson de Ceita Pereira Jorge	–	MF													→			26	^{19(1)}	^{0}	↑			
(Senegal)	Badará	Alioune Badará Samb	23	FW		–																				
(Democratic Republic of the Congo)	Bakongolia	Daniel Bakongolia Bosenge Zibangwana	26	FW			–																			
(Angola)	Balacai	Evaristo Maurício Pascoal	25	MF													→			14	^{10(3)}	^{0}				→
(Senegal)	Baptiste Faye	Jen Baptiste Faye	27	FW			→	18																		
(Angola)	Beny Tchissingui	Teodoro Edvaldo Rita Tchissingui	–	GK						6	25	^{0}	^{0}	12	^{15}	^{0}	12	^{10}	^{0}	12	^{10}	^{0}	↑			
(Angola)	Boka	Boka Nelson Filho	29	DF	26	26	26	→		17																
(Angola)	Boneco	Manuel Pilartes Sambambi		GK						→	1	^{3}	^{0}	1	^{8(1)}	^{0}	1	^{6}	^{0}	→						
(Niger)	Boubacar	Boubacar Djibou Talatou	29	MF					→	7																
(Angola)	Brazuca	Walter Inácio Furtado Vieira	31	MF										→			14	^{19(1)}	^{0}	→						
(Cameroon)	Buba	Yohanna Buba	30	DF	3	3	→																			
(Angola)	Campos Calei	António Campos Calei	28	DF	29	29	29	29	29	→	2	^{2(3)}	^{0}	2	^{8}	^{0}	→									
(Angola)	Capessa	Severino Ulombe Capessa	36	GK	1	1	1	1		12																
(Angola)	Capita	Evanilson de Jesus Pedro	26	MF				2	2	→																
(Angola)	Caranga	Jorge Mendes Corte-Real Carneiro	22	MF			18	18	→																	
(Angola)	Careca	Nanizawo Jacques António	–	MF		–	–			→	21	^{13(6)}	^{4}	21	^{12(2)}	^{5}				2	^{5(1)}	^{1}	↑			
(Angola)	Carlos Fernandes	Carlos Alberto Fernandes	37	GK					13	13	→															
(Angola)	Cassoma	António Hélder Miranda Cassoma	31	DF				13	13																	
(Angola)	Celson Barros	Celson João Barros Costa	28	MF	6	→	→	27	6																	
(Portugal)	Chevela	José Manuel Chevela de Sousa	32	FW	21																					
(Angola)	Chiló Orlando	Francisco Ananias Orlando	25	FW				10	10	→																
(Angola)	Chitanga	Francisco Vieira Chitanga	–	MF							→			16	^{3(6)}	^{0}	16	^{3(1)}	^{0}	16	^{2}	^{0}	↑			
(Cameroon)	Christian	Christian Heumi Kabon	27	MF					→	11	→															
(Angola)	Dadão Pedro	Manuel Nzagi Pedro	24	GK					→	1	→															
(Angola)	Dário Cardoso	Dário de Sousa Borges Cardoso	29	MF	20	→																				
(Angola)	David Magalhães	David Dinis Magalhães	32	FW			→	23	→																	
(Angola)	Day Day	Zaldivar Doval Augusto Cambinda	26	DF						→	8	^{4(2)}	^{0}	→												
(Angola)	Deco	Moisés Alberto Calepi	–	FW							→			9	^{17(4)}	^{3}	9	^{10(7)}	^{1}	9	^{14(4)}	^{5}	↑			
(Angola)	Diangi	Diangi Reagan Kisiavo Matusiwa	29	MF				25	→																	
(Angola)	Didí Gonga	Paulo Vitor Gonga	24	MF	→	18																				
(Angola)	Domingos Nzolamesso	Domingos Nzolamesso		MF						21				13	^{6(4)}	^{2}	28	^{(1)}	^{0}							
(Angola)	Dudú Leite	Eduardo da Cruz Leite	34	MF	19	19	19	19	19	19	19	^{22}	^{4}	19	^{16}	^{0}										
(Angola)	Efemberg	José Manuel Catendi		MF					→		22	^{0}	^{0}													
(Cameroon)	Edoah										23	^{3(1)}	^{0}													
(Angola)	Edson Silva	Edson Jesus Silva	23	DF		6	6	6	6																	
(Angola)	Elias Pires	Elias Ticiano Araújo Pires	30	DF	2	2																				
(Angola)	Elizur	Yamba Elizur António João		MF		–				→	10	^{1(2)}	^{0}	→												
(Angola)	Estévão Chicambi	Estévão Chissingui Chicambi	28	GK	24	24	24	30																		
(Angola)	Estória	Sérgio António Luís	27	DF						→	15	^{16}	^{0}	→												
(Portugal)	Fábio Gomes	Fábio Ilídio Furtado Gomes	27	FW					–																	
(Brazil)	Fabrício Simões	Fabrício Santos Simões	30	FW			–	3	→																	
(Angola)	Feliciano Catumbela	Feliciano Catumbela		DF										18	^{2(5)}	^{0}	18	^{1(1)}	^{0}							
(Nigeria)	Femi	Joseph Femi Olatubosun	25	MF	11	11	11	11	11																	
(Angola)	Filhão	João Gomes de Oliveira	22	FW						→	11	^{9(10)}	^{2}	→												
(Angola)	Finidi	Luís Domingos Canganjo	26	DF			–	→	22	22	→															
(Cape Verde)	Fock	Fredson Jorge Ramos Tavares	33	GK			→	–	12																	
(Angola)	França	Leandro França Cerqueira	25	MF													24	^{3(1)}	^{0}							
(Cameroon)	Francky	Francky Essombo	25	DF						8	→															
(Angola)	Freddy Santos	Frederico Castro Roque dos Santos	35	FW			→	9																		
(Cape Verde)	Fufuco	António Paiva Tavares	29	FW				–	21																	
(Angola)	Fula	Garcia Fula	20	MF		→	–																			
(Angola)	Garcia, Luwamo	Luwamo Garcia	27	FW	→	20																				
(Angola)	Gaúcho	Jorge Alexandre Boaz	26	DF						18																
(Angola)	Gervinho	Gervinho M. Mateus	–	DF													→			3	^{5(1)}	^{0}	↑			
(Democratic Republic of the Congo)	Gilberto Namata	Gilberto Namata	22	DF						10																
(Angola)	Gildo	Hermenegildo João Seteco	–	FW			→	26	26	26	26	^{18(5)}	^{0}	26	^{12(4)}	^{0}	10	^{13(5)}	^{1}	10	^{6(3)}	^{0}	↑			
(Angola)	Gudes	Gudes Felisberto Catumbela		MF							→			8	^{6(5)}	^{0}	8	^{2(3)}	^{0}	8	^{(1)}	^{0}				→
(Angola)	Henrique			DF	–																					
(Portugal)	Hugo Costa	Hugo Miguel Gonçalves Costa	24	DF				15	→																	
(Portugal)	Hugo Firmino	Hugo Filipe Pinto Servulo Firmino	25	DF			27	→																		
(Angola)	Igor Nascimento	Mbanino Igor Samu Nascimento	30	FW	→	10	10	→																		
(Brazil)	Índio	João Luís da Silva	29	FW													→			2	^{2(1)}	^{0}				
(Angola)	Jeremias													24	^{(1)}	^{0}										
(Angola)	Jó Simão	João Milagre Chiva Simão	–	MF						23	7	^{1}	^{0}	7	^{12(1)}	^{1}	7	^{18(2)}	^{1}	7	^{(1)}	^{0}	↑			
(Portugal)	João Manuel	João Leitão Gonçalves Manuel	21	GK					–																	
(Angola)	Joca Cassicote	João Baptista Cassicote	–	FW							→			11	^{6(4)}	^{0}	11	^{2(3)}	^{0}	11	^{5(3)}	^{0}	↑			
(Angola)	Julião Pucusso	Justo Mateus Pucusso	27	GK													30	^{13}	^{0}							
(Angola)	Kapú	Guilherme Mafuta Kapu		MF													13	^{2(2)}	^{0}							
(Angola)	Kialunda	João Vienga Kialenda	25	DF	4																					
(Angola)	Kikas Assis	Francisco Caetano Monteiro de Assis	32	DF		–	–																			
(Ghana)	Kissi	Kingslei Kofi Kissi	25	GK										→						1	^{7}	^{0}				→
(Angola)	Kongolo	Emilio Kongolo		FW													29	^{5(1)}	^{0}	→						
(Democratic Republic of the Congo)	Kuba Kuba	David Kuba Kuba	25	MF																24	^{1(2)}	^{0}				→
(Cameroon)	Landry	Landry Tchatchet Ntakeu	25	FW					9	9	9	^{4(2)}	^{0}	→												
(Angola)	Langanga	Landu Langanga	21	GK					→		30	^{7}	^{0}	→												
(Angola)	Lara Domingos	Manuel Jacinto Domingos	28	DF													→			28	^{18}	^{0}				→
(Cameroon)	Latifou	Latifou Badarou	21	FW					5		3	^{12(4)}	^{1}	→												
(Angola)	Lelé Pengui	Fabiano Miguel Pengui	29	DF				–	28	28	28	^{21}	^{0}	→			–	^{2}	^{0}	→						
(Angola)	Leonardo Lutonadio	Leonardo Lutonadio	21	MF						6																
(Angola)	Leya			GK					17																	
(Democratic Republic of the Congo)	Lokwa	Lokwa Mbo Blanchard	29	GK	12	12	12	→		→	12	^{18}	^{0}	→												
(Angola)	Loló Cassule	Jorge Miguel Gonçalves Cassule	27	DF						→	17	^{8}	^{0}	→												
(Angola)	Love, João	João Love		FW						→	24	^{8(11)}	^{5}	→												
(Angola)	Love Cabungula	Arsénio Sebastião Cabungula	36	FW					9																	
(Angola)	Lucas Dongala	Lucas Dongala															28	^{6}	^{1}	→						
(Angola)	Lúcio Capoco	Ediberto Lúcio Capoco	–	MF						25				15	^{1}	^{0}	25	^{3(2)}	^{1}	25	^{9(3)}	^{1}	↑			
(Angola)	Makusa	Makusa Nzembe Lemi José	27	FW										15	^{9}	^{1}	15	^{11(8)}	^{4}	15	^{9(6)}	^{3}				→
(Angola)	Malamba Sahandas	António Malamba Sahandas	–								23	^{(1)}	^{0}	23	^{1(3)}	^{0}	23	^{14(8)}	^{1}	23	^{5(3)}	^{0}	↑			
(Portugal)	Mangualde	Ricardo Jorge Marques Duarte	32	DF		8	8	8	→																	
(Angola)	Maninho António	Adelino Wima Calunhi António	–	FW						2	20	^{4(1)}	^{0}	20	^{17(3)}	^{1}	20	^{17(3)}	^{0}	20	^{10(1)}	^{1}	↑			
(Portugal)	Marinho	Mário Jorge Ferreira da Silva	30	DF	30	30	30	→																		
(Angola)	Massinga	Moisés Armando Yango	24	FW	10	→																				
(Angola)	Maurito	Norberto Mauro da Costa Mulenessa	31	FW		–																				
(Angola)	Mendinho Tavares	Walter Moura Mendes Tavares	29	MF										21	^{4(5)}	^{1}										
(Angola)	Miguel Pedro	Miguel Bengi Pedro	22	FW							→			24	^{3(6)}	^{0}										
(Angola)	Mona Mudile	Nelson Miango Mudile	23	DF										6	^{19}	^{1}	6	^{14}	^{0}	6	^{11}	^{0}				→
(Angola)	Moyo			GK										30	^{5}	^{0}	30	^{DNP}								
(Angola)	Nanayo	Nelson Candumbo Moma	28	DF							→			28	^{6}	^{0}	→									
(Democratic Republic of the Congo)	Ngaki	Francisco Lambote Ngaki	25	DF			–																			
(Angola)	Nilton Monteiro	Domingos Nílton Monteiro	–	MF													2	^{6(7)}	^{0}	27	^{2(3)}	^{1}	↑			
(Angola)	Nuno Neto	Nuno Miguel de Menezes Neto	36	MF				→	18	→	18	^{18(3)}	^{1}	→			26	^{14(1)}	^{0}							
(Portugal)	Nuno Rodrigues	Nuno Filipe Martins Rodrigues	34	DF	→	13	13	→																		
(Angola)	Nuno Silva	Nuno Miguel Moreira da Cunha Ribeiro e Silva	28	FW			→	21																		
(Angola)	Nzinga Delgado	Pedro N. Delgado															24	^{3}	^{0}							
(Angola)	Osório	Osório Smith de Freitas Carvalho	34	DF	5	→			5																	
(Angola)	Ossiki	Ricardo João da Silva	22	DF					3	3	→															
(Angola)	Padre	Carlos Rúben Cardoso Padre	26	DF	8																					
(Angola)	Paixão		19	MF				28																		
(Angola)	Paizinho Calenga	Hercânio Chitaca Calenga	37	FW	15	15		→	20	20	→			→			19	^{23(1)}	^{7}	19	^{12(5)}	^{2}				→
(Angola)	Palhares	João Carlos Barreto Palhares	27	DF	23																					
(Democratic Republic of the Congo)	Patrick Anfumu	Patrick Lembo Anfumu	32	FW										25	^{4(1)}	^{0}										
(Angola)	Patrick Ferreira	Patrick de Sousa Ferreira									→			10	^{7(3)}	^{0}	→									
(Democratic Republic of the Congo)	Pedro, Munday	Munday Pedro	26	FW						27	27	^{3(3)}	^{0}	27	^{5(3)}	^{1}	27	^{5(6)}	^{1}							
(Angola)	Pedro Gael	Kakandio Tikina Pedro Gael	21	DF						5																
(Angola)	Pedro Júnior	Pedro Videira Júnior	26	FW		→	–																			
(Angola)	Pilola	José Olívio Andrade Pereira	28	MF		→	15	→																		
(Angola)	Projecto	Jaime Cotingo Martinho	27	DF	→	4	24	24	24	24	→															
(Angola)	Putchú	Gonçalves Manico	–	MF													21	^{1}	^{0}	21			↑			
(Brazil)	Reginaldo Cavalcante	Reginaldo Chagas Cavalcante	30	FW	9	→																				
(Portugal)	Ricardo Silva	Nuno Ricardo da Nova Silva	35	GK				12	→																	
(Angola)	Rodrigo																			–	^{DNP}					→
(Portugal)	Rossano	Rossano Valdir Conceição Rodera	27	DF				–																		
(Angola)	Rúben Gouveia	Rúben Sílvio Lino Gouveia	29	MF			→	17	→																	
(Angola)	Rúben Nathis	Rúben de Sousa Nathis	29	FW	17	→																				
(Angola)	Rui Maurício	Rui Carlos Tavares Maurício	26	DF	27																					
(Democratic Republic of the Congo)	Shayi	Mukengeshayi Tumba	25	FW	–	→	23	→																		
(Angola)	Silva Cussanda	Domingos Silvano Cussanda	36	DF						→	5	^{18}	^{0}	5	^{19(1)}	^{0}	5	^{22}	^{4}	5	^{14(4)}	^{0}				→
(Angola)	Simão Veya	Rosalino Veya	24	MF					3																	
(Angola)	Simba Nguala	Simba Carlos Nguala	23	DF				→	–																	
(Angola)	Soki	Soki N'Zinga	28	FW		21																				
(Angola)	Stélvio Cruz	Stélvio Rosa da Cruz	23	MF	→	5	→																			
(Angola)	Sukuma	Sukuma Tomás	23	MF						21																
(Angola)	Tavares Carvalho	Tavares Rodrigo de Carvalho		DF							→			3	^{4}	^{0}	3	^{6}	^{0}							
(Angola)	Tchitchi	Cláudio Segunda Adão	–	MF							→			17	^{22(3)}	^{5}	17	^{23(6)}	^{3}	17	^{16(4)}	^{0}	↑			
(Democratic Republic of the Congo)	Thierry										13	^{15(1)}	^{1}													
(Cameroon)	Tigui	Tigui Hervé	19	MF						23																
(Angola)	Tito, Paulo	Paulo Ukumbua Tito	21	FW					23																	
(Angola)	Tobias Domingos	Bartolomeu de Sousa Domingos	31	DF							→			22	^{16(4)}	^{0}	22	^{16(3)}	^{1}	22	^{18}	^{0}				→
(Angola)	Tombé	David António Kivuma		MF							6	^{14(2)}	^{1}	→												
(Democratic Republic of the Congo)	Tusevo	Iyomi Mboyo Tusevo	28	FW		9																				
(Angola)	Vadinho Luana	Vasco Tchacama Luana	23	MF						29	29	^{(3)}	^{0}	29	^{3}	^{0}	→									
(Angola)	Vado Alves	Artur Carvalho Baptista Alves	23	DF	25	25																				
(Angola)	Valdo	Valdo Gonçalves Alhinho	25	MF		→	–																			
(Angola)	Vidigal	Jorge Filipe da Cruz Vidigal	34	DF	22	22																				
(Angola)	Vitinho	Daniel Xavier	21	FW						30																
(Angola)	Viví Cigarro	David Kachimongo Faria Cigarro	25	MF	→	23																				
(Angola)	Vovó	Joaquim Candimba António Luhaco	29	MF	14	14	14	14	14	14	14	^{23(1)}	^{3}	14	^{10(1)}	^{0}										
(Brazil)	Weverton	Weverton Kleyton Manicoba Honório	30	DF													→			13	^{15}	^{0}				→
(Cape Verde)	Wilson Gonçalves	Wilson Monteiro Gaio Gonçalves	28	FW	16	→																				
(Angola)	Wuta	João Kisota Wuta																		18	^{3(2)}	^{0}				→
(Angola)	Yamba Asha	João Osvaldo Yamba Asha	40	DF					15	15																
(Angola)	Yanick Landu	Yanick Landu		FW				–																		
(Angola)	Yong			DF										13	^{3}	^{0}	13	^{2}	^{0}							
(Angola)	Zé Augusto Gomes	José Augusto de Oliveira e Gomes	32	MF		→	28	→																		
(Angola)	Zeca Macosso	Maurício Dembe Macosso	29	FW						16	16	^{15(9)}	^{1}	→												
Years					2011	2012	2013	2014	2015	2016	2017			2018			2018-19		25	2019–20		17				

== 2001–2010 ==
C.R. Caála players 2001–2010

Nat	Nick	Name	A	P	–f	–	–	–	M.A.	J.K.	J.P.	L.A.	
Nat	Nick	Name	A	P	2003	2004	2005	2006	2007	2008	2009	2010	
Nat	Nick	Name	A	P	3b	4b	3b	4b	3b	1b	9	2	
(Angola)	Benvindo Regresso	Benvindo Regresso Pontes Garcia	23	MF						→	2009	→	
(Angola)	Bobista	Alcídio Francisco da Conceição		DF						2008	2009	→	
(Angola)	Bobó, Dauda	Dauda Diantela Bobo							2007				
(Cameroon)	Buba	Buba Yohanna	–	DF							→	2010	→
(Angola)	Campos Calei	António Campos Calei	–	DF								2010	↑
(Angola)	Capessa, Severino	Severino Ulombe Capessa	–	GK						→	2009	2010	↑
(Angola)	Casspira			FW						2008			
(Angola)	Castigo	Eduardo de Andrade Cancelinhas	26	MF							2009	→	
(Angola)	Celson Barros	Celson João Barros Costa	–	DF							2009	2010	↑
(Angola)	Concon								2007				
(Angola)	Dário Cardoso	Dário de Sousa Borges Cardoso	–	MF							2009	2010	↑
(Angola)	Diló									2008			
(Angola)	Drogba								2007				
(Angola)	Dudú Leite	Eduardo da Cruz Leite	–	MF						→	2009	2010	↑
(Angola)	Elias Pires	Elias Ticiano Araújo Pires	–	DF					2007	2008	2009	2010	↑
(Angola)	Eliseu Campos	Eliseu José Campos Cahombo	30								→	2010	
(Angola)	Estevão Chicambi	Estévão Chissingui Chicambi	–	GK						2008	2009	2010	↑
(Nigeria)	Femi	Joseph Femi Olatubosun	–	FW						→	2009	2010	↑
(Angola)	Fuxito	Afonso Ramilde Sampaio Henriques	29	FW							→	2010	→
(Angola)	Gilex									2008	→		
(Brazil)	Glauco	Glauco André Ferreira	33	FW								2010	
(Angola)	Gonçalo	Gonçalo Santana António									2009		
(Brazil)	Jaco	João Gonçalves de Almeida	22	MF								2010	
(Angola)	Jandir			MF						2008			
(Brazil)	Kemerson	Kemerson Freitas da Costa	26	MF						→	2009	→	
(Angola)	Kialunda	João Vienga Kialenda	–	DF						→	2009	2010	↑
(Angola)	Maizer									2008	→		
(Angola)	Maquemba	Eldon Martins Maquemba	25	FW							2009	→	
(Angola)	Mauro Bastos	Mauro Alexandre Rodrigues Sousa Carvalho Bastos	31	FW							2009	2010	
(Angola)	Mbiyavanga								2007				
(Angola)	Mendes									2008			
(Angola)	Mendonça	António Manuel Viana Mendonça	28	MF								2010	
(Zambia)	Milanzi	Harry Milanzi	31	FW							2009		
(Angola)	Miranda Carlos	António Miranda Carlos		DF							2009		
(Angola)	Ndjusse								2007				
(Angola)	Osório	Osório Smith de Freitas Carvalho	–	DF								2010	↑
(Angola)	Paíto									2008			
(Angola)	Paizinho Calenga	Hercânio Chitaca Calenga	–	FW					2007	→	2009	2010	↑
(Angola)	Passi								2007				
(Angola)	Paulo									2008			
(Angola)	Pick	Fernando Katito Chivanga		DF						2008	→		
(Angola)	Plaston									2008			
(Angola)	Quinzinho Silva	Joaquim Alberto Silva	36	FW								2010	→
(Angola)	Rui Maurício	Rui Carlos Tavares Maurício	–	DF							2009	2010	↑
(Angola)	Salgado	Silvestre Kangundo Ngamba Salgado							2007	2008	→		
(Democratic Republic of the Congo)	Saki	Saki Ndaka Amisi	24	DF								2010	
(Angola)	Tainho	Joaquim Catanha Lázaro							2007				
(Zambia)	Tana	Elijah Tana	35	DF						→	2009	2010	
(Angola)	Tidi								2007				
(Angola)	Tito Samba	Tito Paulino Samba		FW						2008	→		
(Angola)	Trezeguet								2007				
(Angola)	Valódia	Josefino Valódia João								2008			
(Angola)	Vidigal	Jorge Filipe da Cruz Vidigal	–	DF							2009	2010	↑
(Angola)	Vovó	Joaquim Candimba António Luhaco	–	MF					2007	2008	2009	2010	↑
(Angola)	Walter								2007				
(Angola)	Wilson Alegre	Wilson Edgar Pereira Alegre	25	GK							2009	→	
(Angola)	Yuta									2008	→		
(Angola)	Zico			MF					2007	2008	2009	2010	
Years					2003	2004	2005	2006	2007	2008	2009	2010	

== See also ==
- Category:C.R. Caála players
