= List of Portuguese football transfers summer 2011 =

This is a list of Portuguese football transfers for the 2011 summer transfer window. The summer transfer window opened on 1 July and closed at midnight on 31 August.

== Transfers ==
Date	Name	Moving from	Moving to	Fee
28 January 2011	(Uruguay) Rodrigo Mora	(Uruguay) Defensor Sporting	(Portugal) Benfica	Free
29 January 2011	(Serbia) Vladimir Stojković	(Portugal) Sporting C.P.	(Serbia) Partizan	Undisclosed
31 January 2011	(Serbia) Nemanja Matić	(England) Chelsea	(Portugal) Benfica	Free
29 March 2011	(Brazil) Bruno César	(Brazil) Corinthians	(Portugal) Benfica	€5,000,000
3 May 2011	(Peru) André Carrillo	(Peru) Alianza Lima	(Portugal) Sporting C.P.	€1,500,000
16 May 2011	(Brazil) Artur Moraes	(Portugal) S.C. Braga	(Portugal) Benfica	Free
18 May 2011	(Portugal) Sílvio	(Portugal) S.C. Braga	(Spain) Atlético Madrid	€8,000,000
18 May 2011	(Brazil) Rodrigo Defendi	(Brazil) Paraná	(Portugal) Vitória Guimarães	Free
18 May 2011	(Brazil) Leonel Olímpio	(Portugal) F.C. Paços Ferreira	(Portugal) Vitória Guimarães	Free
20 May 2011	(Benin) Emmanuel Imorou	(France) LB Châteauroux	(Portugal) S.C. Braga	Undisclosed
20 May 2011	(Brazil) Rodrigo Galo	(Portugal) Gil Vicente F.C.	(Portugal) S.C. Braga	€200,000
20 May 2011	(Cape Verde) Zé Luís	(Portugal) Gil Vicente F.C.	(Portugal) S.C. Braga	Undisclosed
20 May 2011	(Brazil) Douglas	(Portugal) Vitória Guimarães	(Portugal) S.C. Braga	Free
20 May 2011	(Libya) Djamal	(Portugal) S.C. Beira-Mar	(Portugal) SC Braga	Undisclosed
20 May 2011	(Denmark) Daniel Wass	(Denmark) Brøndby	(Portugal) Benfica	Undisclosed
23 May 2011	(Senegal) Modou Sougou	(Portugal) Académica Coimbra	(Romania) CFR Cluj	Undisclosed
23 May 2011	(Brazil) Renan	(Portugal) Vitória Guimarães	(Romania) CFR Cluj	Undisclosed
23 May 2011	(Brazil) Lionn	(Portugal) Vitória Guimarães	(Romania) CFR Cluj	Undisclosed
23 May 2011	(Brazil) Leandro Tatu	(Portugal) S.C. Beira-Mar	(Romania) Steaua București	Undisclosed
27 May 2011	(Peru) Alberto Rodríguez	(Portugal) S.C. Braga	(Portugal) Sporting C.P.	Free
28 May 2011	(Argentina) Juan Manuel Iturbe	(Paraguay) Cerro Porteño	(Portugal) F.C. Porto	Undisclosed
28 May 2011	(Brazil) Kelvin	(Brazil) Paraná	(Portugal) F.C. Porto	Undisclosed
28 May 2011	(Portugal) Nuno Coelho	(Portugal) Académica Coimbra	(Portugal) Benfica	Undisclosed
29 May 2011	(Spain) Nolito	(Spain) F.C. Barcelona	(Portugal) Benfica	Bosman
30 May 2011	(Netherlands) Ricky van Wolfswinkel	(Netherlands) FC Utrecht	(Portugal) Sporting C.P.	€5,400,000
1 June 2011	(Brazil) Marcelo Valverde	(Brazil) Angra dos Reis	(Portugal) C.D. Nacional	Free
2 June 2011	(Brazil) Sidnei	(Portugal) Benfica	(Turkey) Besiktas	Loan
3 June 2011	(Brazil) Rafael Bracalli	(Portugal) C.D. Nacional	(Portugal) F.C. Porto	Free
5 June 2011	(Morocco) Issam El Adoua	(Kuwait) Qadsia SC	(Portugal) Vitória Guimarães	Free
7 June 2011	(Portugal) Jorginho	(Portugal) F.C. Paços Ferreira	(Portugal) F.C. Arouca	Free
7 June 2011	(Portugal) Nuno André Coelho	(Portugal) Sporting C.P.	(Portugal) S.C. Braga	Undisclosed
8 June 2011	(Ivory Coast) Siaka Bamba	(Portugal) C.D. Feirense	(Portugal) Vitória Guimarães	Undisclosed
8 June 2011	(Uruguay) Jean Barrientos	(Uruguay) Racing Montevideo	(Portugal) Vitória Guimarães	Undisclosed
8 June 2011	(Brazil) Airton	(Portugal) Benfica	(Brazil) Flamengo	Loan
8 June 2011	(Portugal) Nuno Henrique	(Portugal) C.D. Feirense	(Portugal) S.C. Braga	€125,000
8 June 2011	(Argentina) Enzo Pérez	(Argentina) Estudiantes	(Portugal) Benfica	€2,400,000
8 June 2011	(Portugal) João Real	(Portugal) Naval	(Portugal) Académica Coimbra	Free
9 June 2011	(Colombia) Santiago Arias	(Colombia) La Equidad	(Portugal) Sporting C.P.	Free
9 June 2011	(Paraguay) Lorenzo Melgarejo	(Paraguay) Independiente	(Portugal) Benfica	Undisclosed
13 June 2011	(Portugal) Mário Felgueiras	(Portugal) S.C. Braga	(Romania) FC Brașov	Loan
14 June 2011	(Portugal) Miguel Garcia	(Portugal) S.C. Braga	(Turkey) Orduspor	Free
14 June 2011	(Brazil) Leandrinho	(Brazil) Volta Redonda	(Portugal) Gil Vicente F.C.	Free
15 June 2011	(Portugal) Bruno Amaro	(Portugal) C.D. Nacional	(Portugal) Vitória Setúbal	Free
15 June 2011	(Portugal) Miguel Fidalgo	(Portugal) C.D. Nacional	(Portugal) Vitória Setúbal	Free
15 June 2011	(Portugal) Josué	(Portugal) F.C. Porto	(Portugal) F.C. Paços Ferreira	Free
16 June 2011	(Netherlands) Stijn Schaars	(Netherlands) AZ Alkmaar	(Portugal) Sporting C.P.	€850,000
16 June 2011	(Brazil) Marcelo Tchê	(Brazil) Santa Helena	(Portugal) F.C. Paços Ferreira	Free
17 June 2011	(Portugal) Cédric Soares	(Portugal) Sporting C.P.	(Portugal) Académica Coimbra	Loan
17 June 2011	(Cameroon) Douglas Pajetat	(Portugal) S.C. Freamunde	(Portugal) C.D. Feirense	Free
17 June 2011	(Mozambique) Mexer	(Portugal) Sporting C.P.	(Portugal) S.C. Olhanense	Loan
17 June 2011	(Portugal) Ricardo Batista	(Portugal) Sporting C.P.	(Portugal) S.C. Olhanense	Loan
17 June 2011	(São Tomé and Príncipe) Luís Leal	(Portugal) G.D. Estoril Praia	(Portugal) União de Leiria	Loan
17 June 2011	(Portugal) Jorge Chula	(Portugal) F.C. Porto	(Portugal) União de Leiria	Free
17 June 2011	(Portugal) Rui Miguel	(Scotland) Kilmarnock	(Portugal) Académica Coimbra	Free
18 June 2011	(Brazil) Baiano	(Portugal) F.C. Paços Ferreira	(Portugal) S.C. Braga	€400,000
19 June 2011	(Brazil) André Recife	(Brazil) Serrano	(Portugal) C.D. Nacional	Free
19 June 2011	(Brazil) Douglas Pará	(Brazil) Angra dos Reis	(Portugal) C.D. Nacional	Free
21 June 2011	(Brazil) Jorginho	(Turkey) Gaziantepspor	(Portugal) Rio Ave F.C.	Free
21 June 2011	(Brazil) Dinei	(Brazil) Grêmio Anápolis	(Portugal) Rio Ave F.C.	Free
21 June 2011	(Portugal) Marinho	(Portugal) Naval	(Portugal) Académica Coimbra	Free
21 June 2011	(Portugal) Ruben Lima	(Portugal) S.C. Beira-Mar	(Croatia) Hajduk Split	Free
21 June 2011	(Brazil) Felipe Menezes	(Portugal) Benfica	(Brazil) Botafogo	Loan
21 June 2011	(Senegal) Ladji Keita	(Portugal) S.C. Braga	(China) Beijing Guoan	Loan
22 June 2011	(Portugal) Luís Neto	(Portugal) Varzim S.C.	(Portugal) C.D. Nacional	Free
22 June 2011	(Brazil) Cléber	(Portugal) Vitória Guimarães	(Spain) Cartagena	Free
23 June 2011	(Portugal) Feliz	(Portugal) G.D. Ribeirão	(Portugal) Rio Ave F.C.	Free
23 June 2011	(Portugal) Marcelo	(Portugal) G.D. Ribeirão	(Portugal) Rio Ave F.C.	Free
24 June 2011	(Brazil) Ivan Filho	(Brazil) Olaria	(Portugal) C.D. Feirense	Free
24 June 2011	(Brazil) Willian Alves	(Brazil) Rio Branco	(Portugal) C.D. Feirense	Free
24 June 2011	(France) Florent Sinama Pongolle	(Portugal) Sporting C.P.	(France) AS Saint-Étienne	Loan
24 June 2011	(Angola) Stélvio	(Portugal) S.C. Braga	(Germany) Dynamo Dresden	Loan
24 June 2011	(Portugal) Ricardo Pateiro	(Portugal) União de Leiria	(Portugal) Rio Ave F.C.	Free
25 June 2011	(France) Atila Turan	(France) Grenoble Foot 38	(Portugal) Sporting C.P.	Undisclosed
25 June 2011	(France) Alexandre Hauw	(Portugal) Naval	(Portugal) S.C. Beira-Mar	Free
25 June 2011	(Guinea-Bissau) Ivanildo	(Portugal) Portimonense S.C.	(Portugal) S.C. Olhanense	Free
26 June 2011	(Brazil) Célio Santos	(Portugal) Belenenses	(Portugal) Vitória de Setúbal	Free
26 June 2011	(Portugal) André Dias	(Portugal) Rio Ave F.C.	(Portugal) G.D. Ribeirão	Loan
27 June 2011	(Portugal) Diogo Salomão	(Portugal) Sporting C.P.	(Spain) Deportivo de La Coruña	Loan
27 June 2011	(Portugal) Joãozinho	(Portugal) Mafra F.C.	(Portugal) S.C. Beira-Mar	Free
28 June 2011	(Senegal) Abdoulaye Ba	(Portugal) F.C. Porto	(Portugal) Académica Coimbra	Loan
28 June 2011	(Italy) Tommaso Berni	(Italy) S.S. Lazio	(Portugal) S.C. Braga	Free
28 June 2011	(Brazil) Ewerton	(Brazil) Corinthians Alagoano	(Portugal) S.C. Braga	Free
28 June 2011	(Portugal) Bruno Pereirinha	(Portugal) Sporting C.P.	(Portugal) S.C. Olhanense	Loan
28 June 2011	(Portugal) Wilson Eduardo	(Portugal) Sporting C.P.	(Portugal) S.C. Olhanense	Loan
28 June 2011	(United States) Oguchi Onyewu	(Italy) A.C. Milan	(Portugal) Sporting C.P.	Undisclosed
29 June 2011	(Guinea-Bissau) Cícero Semedo	(Portugal) Rio Ave F.C.	(Portugal) F.C. Paços de Ferreira	Free
29 June 2011	(Argentina) Anibal Domeneghini	(Chile) Cobreloa	(Portugal) C.S. Marítimo	Free
29 June 2011	(Portugal) Pedro Queirós	(Portugal) F.C. Paços de Ferreira	(Portugal) C.D. Feirense	Free
29 June 2011	(Brazil) Luíz Carlos	(Portugal) S.C. Freamunde	(Portugal) F.C. Paços de Ferreira	Free
29 June 2011	(Portugal) Diogo Valente	(Portugal) S.C. Braga	(Portugal) Académica Coimbra	Free
30 June 2011	(Brazil) Cauê	(Portugal) Leixões S.C.	(Portugal) S.C. Olhanense	Free
30 June 2011	(Brazil) Marcelo Boeck	(Portugal) C.S. Marítimo	(Portugal) Sporting C.P.	Undisclosed
30 June 2011	(Benin) Djiman Koukou	(France) US Créteil-Lusitanos	(Portugal) S.C. Beira-Mar	Free
30 June 2011	(Portugal) Nuno Gomes	(Portugal) Benfica	(Portugal) S.C. Braga	Free
1 July 2011	(Brazil) Éder Sciola	(Brazil) Ituano	(Portugal) Gil Vicente F.C.	Free
1 July 2011	(Brazil) Fábio Luís	(Brazil) Porto Alegre	(Portugal) Académica Coimbra	Free
1 July 2011	(Argentina) Fabián Rinaudo	(Argentina) Gimnasia La Plata	(Portugal) Sporting C.P.	€525,000
2 July 2011	(Brazil) Guilherme	(Portugal) S.C. Braga	(Portugal) Gil Vicente F.C.	Loan
2 July 2011	(Portugal) Hugo Costa	(Portugal) Varzim S.C.	(Portugal) C.D. Feirense	Free
3 July 2011	(Portugal) André Marques	(Portugal) Sporting C.P.	(Portugal) S.C. Beira-Mar	Loan
3 July 2011	(Uruguay) Luis Aguiar	(Russia) FC Dynamo Moscow	(Portugal) Sporting C.P.	Free
4 July 2011	(Brazil) Kléber	(Portugal) C.S. Marítimo	(Portugal) F.C. Porto	€2,300,000
4 July 2011	(Brazil) Weldon	(Portugal) Benfica	(Romania) CFR Cluj	€1,000,000
5 July 2011	(Portugal) Fábio Coentrão	(Portugal) Benfica	(Spain) Real Madrid C.F.	€30,000,000
5 July 2011	(Portugal) Adrien Silva	(Portugal) Sporting C.P.	(Portugal) Académica Coimbra	Loan
5 July 2011	(Chile) Diego Rubio	(Chile) Colo-Colo	(Portugal) Sporting C.P.	€1,000,000
5 July 2011	(Brazil) Cristiano	(Portugal) Sporting C.P.	(Portugal) S.C. Beira-Mar	Free
5 July 2011	(Cameroon) Christian Pouga	(Romania) FC Vaslui	(Portugal) C.S. Marítimo	Free
6 July 2011	(Brazil) Paulão	(Portugal) S.C. Braga	(France) Saint-Étienne	Free
6 July 2011	(Argentina) Ezequiel Garay	(Spain) Real Madrid C.F.	(Portugal) Benfica	€5,000,000
8 July 2011	(Portugal) Mika	(Portugal) União de Leiria	(Portugal) Benfica	€500,000
6 July 2011	(Bulgaria) Valeri Bojinov	(Italy) Parma F.C.	(Portugal) Sporting C.P.	€2,600,000
6 July 2011	(Chile) Jaime Valdés	(Portugal) Sporting C.P.	(Italy) Parma F.C.	Loan
8 July 2011	(Portugal) Mika	(Portugal) União de Leiria	(Portugal) Benfica	€500,000
8 July 2011	(Portugal) José Moreira	(Portugal) Benfica	(England) Swansea City	€850,000
9 July 2011	(Paraguay) Lorenzo Melgarejo	(Portugal) Benfica	(Portugal) F.C. Paços de Ferreira	Loan
9 July 2011	(Bolivia) Mauricio Saucedo	(Bolivia) Oriente Petrolero	(Portugal) Vitória Guimarães	Free
9 July 2011	(Brazil) Alan Kardec	(Portugal) Benfica	(Brazil) Santos FC	Loan
11 July 2011	(Brazil) Valdomiro	(Portugal) Vitória de Setúbal	(Turkey) Samsunspor	Free
11 July 2011	(Brazil) Hugo Alcântara	(Brazil) Paranaense	(Portugal) União Leiria	Free
11 July 2011	(Portugal) Miguel Rosa	(Portugal) Benfica	(Portugal) Belenenses	Loan
11 July 2011	(Brazil) Laionel	(Brazil) Grêmio Inhumense	(Portugal) Gil Vicente F.C.	Free
12 July 2011	(China) Zhang Chengdong	(Portugal) União de Leiria	(Portugal) S.C. Beira-Mar	Free
12 July 2011	(Portugal) Diogo Rosado	(Portugal) Sporting C.P.	(Portugal) C.D. Feirense	Loan
13 July 2011	(Argentina) Marco Torsiglieri	(Portugal) Sporting C.P.	(Ukraine) Metalist Kharkiv	Loan
13 July 2011	(Belgium) Axel Witsel	(Belgium) Standard Liège	(Portugal) Benfica	€8,000,000
14 July 2011	(Brazil) Bruno Moraes	(Portugal) Naval	(Portugal) União de Leiria	Free
14 July 2011	(Venezuela) Mario Rondón	(Portugal) F.C. Paços de Ferreira	(Portugal) C.D. Nacional	Undisclosed
14 July 2011	(Portugal) Rui Fonte	(Portugal) Sporting C.P.	(Spain) RCD Espanyol	Undisclosed
14 July 2011	(Germany) Dominic Reinold	(United States) New Jersey Rangers	(Portugal) S.C. Beira-Mar	Free
15 July 2011	(France) Romain Salin	(Portugal) Naval	(Portugal) C.S. Marítimo	Free
15 July 2011	(Portugal) Pedro Mendes	(Portugal) Sporting C.P.	(Portugal) Vitória de Guimarães	Free
18 July 2011	(Portugal) Eduardo	(Italy) Genoa C.F.C.	(Portugal) Benfica	Loan
18 July 2011	(Brazil) Emerson	(France) Lille OSC	(Portugal) Benfica	€2,000,000
18 July 2011	(Tunisia) Khalil Chemmam	(Tunisia) Espérance	(Portugal) F.C. Paços de Ferreira	Free
18 July 2011	(Portugal) Vítor Bastos	(Portugal) Vitória Guimarães	(Portugal) Atlético C.P.	Loan
19 July 2011	(Spain) Diego Capel	(Spain) Sevilla FC	(Portugal) Sporting C.P.	€3,500,000
19 July 2011	(Nigeria) Ekele Udojoh	(Thailand) BEC Tero Sasana F.C.	(Portugal) C.S. Marítimo	Free
20 July 2011	(Brazil) Jô	(Brazil) Atlético Clube Juventus	(Portugal) União de Leiria	Free
20 July 2011	(Portugal) Ivo Pinto	(Portugal) FC Porto	(Portugal) União de Leiria	Loan
20 July 2011	(Brazil) Danilo	(Brazil) Santos FC	(Portugal) F.C. Porto	€13,000,000
20 July 2011	(Ivory Coast) Siaka Bamba	(Portugal) Vitória Guimarães	(Portugal) S.C. Beira-Mar	Loan
20 July 2011	(Cape Verde) Fernando Varela	(Portugal) C.D. Trofense	(Portugal) C.D. Feirense	Free
21 July 2011	(Spain) Joan Capdevila	(Spain) Villarreal CF	(Portugal) Benfica	Free
22 July 2011	(Portugal) Carlos Saleiro	(Portugal) Sporting C.P.	(Switzerland) Servette	Free
22 July 2011	(Brazil) Edmar Figueira	(India) Pune FC	(Portugal) C.D. Feirense	Free
22 July 2011	(Denmark) Daniel Wass	(Portugal) Benfica	(France) Evian	Loan
23 July 2011	(Brazil) Alex Sandro	(Brazil) Santos FC	(Portugal) F.C. Porto	€9,600,000
23 July 2011	(Portugal) João Ribeiro	(Portugal) Vitória de Guimarães	(Turkey) Orduspor	Loan
23 July 2011	(Portugal) Luís Filipe	(Portugal) Benfica	(Portugal) S.C. Olhanense	Free
26 July 2011	(Portugal) Rui Miguel	(Portugal) Vitória Guimarães	(Russia) FC Kuban Krasnodar	€1,000,000
28 July 2011	(Portugal) Fernando Alexandre	(Portugal) S.C. Braga	(Portugal) S.C. Olhanense	Loan
28 July 2011	(Portugal) Yazalde	(Portugal) S.C. Braga	(Portugal) Rio Ave F.C.	Loan
29 July 2011	(Portugal) Zeca	(Portugal) Vitória Setúbal	(Greece) Panathinaikos	Undisclosed
1 August 2011	(Spain) Roberto	(Portugal) Benfica	(Spain) Real Zaragoza	€8,600,000
2 August 2011	(Argentina) José Shaffer	(Portugal) Benfica	(Portugal) União Leiria	Loan
3 August 2011	(Spain) Alberto Zapater	(Portugal) Sporting C.P.	(Russia) Lokomotiv Moscow	Free
3 August 2011	(Spain) Jeffrén Suárez	(Spain) F.C. Barcelona	(Portugal) Sporting C.P.	€3,750,000
4 August 2011	(Brazil) Maykon	(Portugal) F.C. Paços de Ferreira	(Portugal) União de Leiria	Undisclosed
6 August 2011	(Brazil) Douglas	(Portugal) S.C. Braga	(Portugal) S.C. Beira-Mar	Loan
10 August 2011	(Brazil) Kelvin	(Portugal) F.C. Porto	(Portugal) Rio Ave F.C.	Loan
12 August 2011	(Portugal) Carlos Martins	(Portugal) Benfica	(Spain) Granada CF	Loan
15 August 2011	(Equatorial Guinea) Javier Balboa	(Portugal) Benfica	(Portugal) S.C. Beira-Mar	Free
16 August 2011	(Slovenia) Jan Oblak	(Portugal) Benfica	(Portugal) União de Leiria	Loan
16 August 2011	(Portugal) Jorge Ribeiro	(Portugal) Benfica	(Spain) Granada CF	Free
16 August 2011	(Portugal) Ricardo	(England) Leicester City	(Portugal) Vitória Setúbal	Free
16 August 2011	(France) Eliaquim Mangala	(Belgium) Standard Liège	(Portugal) F.C. Porto	€6,500,000
16 August 2011	(Belgium) Steven Defour	(Belgium) Standard Liège	(Portugal) F.C. Porto	€6,000,000
16 August 2011	(Portugal) André Castro	(Portugal) F.C. Porto	(Spain) Sporting de Gijón	Loan
17 August 2011	(Portugal) Henrique Sereno	(Portugal) F.C. Porto	(Germany) 1. FC Köln	Loan
17 August 2011	(Brazil) Júlio César	(Portugal) Benfica	(Spain) Granada CF	Loan
17 August 2011	(Portugal) Nuno Coelho	(Portugal) Benfica	(Portugal) S.C. Beira-Mar	Loan
18 August 2011	(Colombia) Radamel Falcao	(Portugal) F.C. Porto	(Spain) Atlético Madrid	€40,000,000
18 August 2011	(Portugal) Rúben Micael	(Portugal) F.C. Porto	(Spain) Atlético Madrid	€5,000,000
19 August 2011	(Nigeria) Samson Kayode	(Spain) Atlético Madrid	(Portugal) S.C. Braga	Loan
19 August 2011	(Brazil) Carlão	(Japan) Kashima Antlers	(Portugal) S.C. Braga	Loan
22 August 2011	(Brazil) Roberto	(China) Beijing Guoan	(Portugal) Gil Vicente F.C.	Free
22 August 2011	(Brazil) Douglão	(Greece) Kavala F.C.	(Portugal) S.C. Braga	Free
26 August 2011	(Portugal) Fábio Faria	(Portugal) Benfica	(Portugal) F.C. Paços de Ferreira	Loan
27 August 2011	(Portugal) Pizzi	(Portugal) S.C. Braga	(Spain) Atlético Madrid	Loan
27 August 2011	(Spain) Fran Mérida	(Spain) Atlético Madrid	(Portugal) S.C. Braga	Loan
27 August 2011	(Mexico) Édson Rivera	(Mexico) Club Atlas	(Portugal) S.C. Braga	Undisclosed
29 August 2011	(France) Lionel Carole	(Portugal) Benfica	(France) Sedan	Loan
30 August 2011	(Senegal) Baba Diawara	(Portugal) C.S. Marítimo	(Scotland) Celtic F.C.	€2,500,000
30 August 2011	(Portugal) Marco Caneira	(Portugal) Sporting C.P.	(Hungary) Videoton	Free
30 August 2011	(Argentina) Franco Jara	(Portugal) Benfica	(Spain) Granada	Loan
30 August 2011	(Portugal) João Pereira	(Portugal) S.C. Beira-Mar	(Portugal) C.D. Trofense	Loan
30 August 2011	(Portugal) Tinoco	(Portugal) S.C. Beira-Mar	(Portugal) G.D. Estoril Praia	Loan
30 August 2011	(Brazil) Elias	(Spain) Atlético Madrid	(Portugal) Sporting C.P.	€8,850,000
31 August 2011	(Portugal) Roderick Miranda	(Portugal) Benfica	(Switzerland) Servette	Loan
31 August 2011	(Portugal) Yannick Djaló	(Portugal) Sporting C.P.	(France) Nice	€4,500,000
31 August 2011	(France) Atila Turan	(Portugal) Sporting C.P.	(Portugal) S.C. Beira-Mar	Loan
31 August 2011	(Portugal) Rui Sampaio	(Portugal) S.C. Beira-Mar	(Italy) Cagliari Calcio	€600,000
31 August 2011	(Portugal) Rui Pedro	(Portugal) F.C. Porto	(Romania) CFR Cluj	Free
31 August 2011	(Brazil) Guilherme	(Portugal) S.C. Braga	(Portugal) Gil Vicente F.C.	Loan
31 August 2011	(Poland) Paweł Kieszek	(Portugal) F.C. Porto	(Netherlands) Roda	Loan
31 August 2011	(Portugal) Hélder Postiga	(Portugal) Sporting C.P.	(Spain) Real Zaragoza	€1,000,000
31 August 2011	(Guinea-Bissau) Zézinho	(Portugal) Sporting C.P.	(Portugal) Atlético	Loan
31 August 2011	(Haiti) Jean Sony	(Portugal) Leixões S.C.	(Portugal) Rio Ave F.C.	Free
31 August 2011	(Uruguay) Jonathan Urretaviscaya	(Portugal) Benfica	(Portugal) Vitória Guimarães	Loan
31 August 2011	(Portugal) Orlando Sá	(Portugal) F.C. Porto	(England) Fulham F.C.	Free
31 August 2011	(Portugal) Zequinha	(Portugal) S.C. Olhanense	(Greece) AEL	Loan
31 August 2011	(Argentina) Leandro Grimi	(Portugal) Sporting C.P.	(Belgium) K.R.C. Genk	Loan
31 August 2011	(Ghana) David Addy	(Portugal) F.C. Porto	(Greece) Panetolikos	Loan
31 August 2011	(Portugal) Beto	(Portugal) F.C. Porto	(Romania) CFR Cluj	Loan

- ^1 Player who signs with his new club before the 1 July 2011 will officially join his club on 1 July 2011.
