= List of Portuguese football transfers winter 2011–12 =

This is a List of Portuguese football transfers winter 2012. The winter transfer window opened on 1 January 2012 and closed at midnight on 31 January 2012. Transfers for players may happen after the deadline due to other international leagues having different transfer window systems of when they close. Only moves involving Primeira Liga clubs are listed. Players without a club may join a club at any time, either during or in between transfer windows.

== Transfers ==
| Date | Name | Moving from | Moving to | Fee |
|---|---|---|---|---|
| 15 November 2011 | (Nigeria) John Ogu | (Spain) Almería B | (Portugal) União de Leiria | Free |
| 6 December 2011 | (Saudi Arabia) Abdullah Al-Hafith | (Saudi Arabia) Al-Ettifaq Club | (Portugal) União de Leiria | Undisclosed |
| 7 December 2011 | (Portugal) João Pereira | (Portugal) Beira-Mar | (Moldova) FC Sheriff Tiraspol | Free |
| 14 December 2011 | (Brazil) Henrique | (Portugal) Vitória de Setúbal | (Brazil) Náutico | Free |
| 15 December 2011 | (Brazil) Maranhão | (Portugal) Vitória de Guimarães | (Brazil) Vila Nova | Free |
| 22 December 2011 | (Brazil) Júlio César | (Portugal) Académica de Coimbra | (Portugal) Moreirense | Free |
| 24 December 2011 | (Cape Verde) Sidnei | (Portugal) Gil Vicente | (Angola) Libolo | Loan |
| 26 December 2011 | (Brazil) Rafael Copetti | (Brazil) Internacional | (Portugal) Benfica | Free |
| 28 December 2011 | (Brazil) Diego Alemão | (Brazil) Paraná | (Portugal) União de Leiria | Free |
| 29 December 2011 | (Montenegro) Žarko Tomašević | (Portugal) Nacional | (Portugal) União da Madeira | Loan |
| 29 December 2011 | (Portugal) Nuno Pinto | (Portugal) Nacional | (Bulgaria) Levski Sofia | Free |
| 29 December 2011 | (Brazil) Rodrigo Galo | (Portugal) SC Braga | (Portugal) Gil Vicente | Loan |
| 29 December 2011 | (Mali) Alphousseyni Keita | (France) Nîmes | (Portugal) União de Leiria | Free |
| 30 December 2011 | (Brazil) Ozéia | (Romania) Vaslui | (Portugal) Paços de Ferreira | Free |
| 31 December 2011 | (Austria) Markus Berger | (Portugal) Académica de Coimbra | (Ukraine) Chornomorets Odesa | €200,000 |
| 1 January 2012 | (Argentina) Marco Torsiglieri | (Portugal) Sporting CP | (Ukraine) Metalist Kharkiv | €1,700,000 |
| 2 January 2012 | (Brazil) Luís Alberto | (Portugal) Nacional | (Portugal) SC Braga | Undisclosed |
| 2 January 2012 | (Portugal) Vasco Fernandes | (Portugal) Beira-Mar | (Portugal) Olhanense | Free |
| 2 January 2012 | (Brazil) Diego Gaúcho | (Portugal) União de Leiria | (Brazil) Santa Cruz | Free |
| 3 January 2012 | (Brazil) Xandão | (Brazil) Desportivo Brasil | (Portugal) Sporting CP | Loan |
| 3 January 2012 | (Portugal) Tony | (Portugal) Vitória de Guimarães | (Portugal) Paços de Ferreira | Free |
| 4 January 2012 | (Brazil) Walter | (Portugal) FC Porto | (Brazil) Cruzeiro | Loan |
| 4 January 2012 | (Ivory Coast) Ibrahim Sissoko | (Portugal) Académica de Coimbra | (Germany) Wolfsburg | Undisclosed |
| 4 January 2012 | (Uruguay) Sebastián Ribas | (Italy) Genoa | (Portugal) Sporting CP | Loan |
| 5 January 2012 | (Portugal) William Carvalho | (Portugal) Sporting CP | (Belgium) Cercle Brugge | Loan |
| 5 January 2012 | (Brazil) Felipe Lopes | (Portugal) Nacional | (Germany) Wolfsburg | Undisclosed |
| 5 January 2012 | (Cape Verde) Ricardo | (China) Shandong Luneng | (Portugal) Paços de Ferreira | Free |
| 5 January 2012 | (Uruguay) Luis Aguiar | (Portugal) Sporting CP | (Uruguay) Peñarol | Loan |
| 6 January 2012 | (Senegal) Ladji Keita | (Portugal) SC Braga | (Portugal) Nacional | Free |
| 6 January 2012 | (Guinea-Bissau) Cícero | (Portugal) Paços de Ferreira | (Portugal) Moreirense | Loan |
| 6 January 2012 | (Brazil) Jaílson | (Portugal) Vitória de Setúbal | (Brazil) Boa Esporte | Free |
| 6 January 2012 | (Bolivia) Mauricio Saucedo | (Portugal) Vitória de Guimarães | (Brazil) Bragantino | Free |
| 6 January 2012 | (Portugal) Miguel Lopes | (Portugal) FC Porto | (Portugal) SC Braga | Loan |
| 7 January 2012 | (Brazil) Samuel | (Belgium) Anderlecht | (Portugal) SC Braga | Free |
| 10 January 2012 | (Brazil) Marçal | (Portugal) Torreense | (Portugal) Nacional | Free |
| 12 January 2012 | (Portugal) Moreno | (England) Leicester City | (Portugal) Nacional | Free |
| 13 January 2012 | (Cameroon) Albert Meyong | (Portugal) SC Braga | (Portugal) Vitória de Setúbal | Free |
| 13 January 2012 | (Brazil) André Recife | (Portugal) Nacional | (Portugal) União da Madeira | Loan |
| 14 January 2012 | (Brazil) Vinícius | (South Africa) Moroka Swallows | (Portugal) União de Leiria | Free |
| 14 January 2012 | (Uruguay) Rodrigo Mora | (Portugal) Benfica | (Uruguay) Peñarol | Loan |
| 14 January 2012 | (Portugal) David Simão | (Portugal) Benfica | (Portugal) Académica de Coimbra | Loan |
| 14 January 2012 | (Uruguay) Jorge Fucile | (Portugal) FC Porto | (Brazil) Santos | Loan |
| 17 January 2012 | (Brazil) Edson Sitta | (Portugal) Vitória de Guimarães | (Portugal) Beira-Mar | Free |
| 17 January 2012 | (Guinea-Bissau) Bacar Baldé | (Portugal) Paços de Ferreira | (Portugal) Arouca | Loan |
| 17 January 2012 | (Senegal) Baba Diawara | (Portugal) Marítimo | (Spain) Sevilla | €3,000,000 |
| 20 January 2012 | (Brazil) Diego Alemão | (Portugal) União de Leiria | (Brazil) Coritiba | Free |
| 20 January 2012 | (Portugal) Serginho | (Portugal) Vitória de Guimarães | (Portugal) Portimonense | Free |
| 23 January 2012 | (Argentina) Jorge Molina | (Colombia) Real Cartagena | (Portugal) Vitória de Guimarães | Free |
| 23 January 2012 | (Brazil) Rafael Copetti | (Portugal) Benfica | (Portugal) União de Leiria | Loan |
| 23 January 2012 | (Portugal) Sérgio Oliveira | (Portugal) FC Porto | (Portugal) Penafiel | Loan |
| 23 January 2012 | (Cameroon) Ghislain Mvom | (Cameroon) Astres | (Portugal) Académica de Coimbra | Free |
| 24 January 2012 | (Portugal) Diogo Figueiras | (Portugal) Paços de Ferreira | (Portugal) Moreirense | Loan |
| 24 January 2012 | (Spain) José Collado | (Portugal) SC Braga | (Spain) CD Guadalajara | Loan |
| 27 January 2012 | (Brazil) Cássio | (Romania) Rapid București | (Portugal) Beira-Mar | Loan |
| 27 January 2012 | (Senegal) Babacar Gueye | (Germany) Alemannia Aachen | (Portugal) União de Leiria | Free |
| 27 January 2012 | (Mozambique) Jerry Sitoe | (Portugal) Académica de Coimbra | (Portugal) Trofense | Free |
| 28 January 2012 | (Portugal) Edinho | (Spain) Málaga | (Portugal) Académica de Coimbra | Loan |
| 29 January 2012 | (Argentina) Meza | (Portugal) Olhanense | (Portugal) Portimonense | Loan |
| 29 January 2012 | (Guinea-Bissau) Abel Camará | (Portugal) Belenenses | (Portugal) Beira-Mar | €60,000 |
| 29 January 2012 | (Brazil) Ferreira | (Brazil) Corinthians Alagoano | (Portugal) Académica de Coimbra | Loan |
| 29 January 2012 | (Brazil) Willian Araújo | (Brazil) Corinthians Alagoano | (Portugal) Académica de Coimbra | Loan |
| 30 January 2012 | (Portugal) Ruben Amorim | (Portugal) Benfica | (Portugal) SC Braga | Loan |
| 30 January 2012 | (Ivory Coast) Marc Zoro | (Portugal) Benfica | (France) Angers | Free |
| 30 January 2012 | (Portugal) Nuno Lopes | (Portugal) Oliveirense | (Portugal) Beira-Mar | Free |
| 30 January 2012 | (Portugal) Tiago Cintra | (Portugal) Leixões | (Portugal) Beira-Mar | Free |
| 30 January 2012 | (Brazil) Cristiano | (Portugal) Beira-Mar | (Romania) Rapid București | Free |
| 30 January 2012 | (Portugal) Anselmo | (Portugal) Nacional | (Portugal) Rio Ave | Loan |
| 30 January 2012 | (El Salvador) Arturo Alvarez | (United States) Real Salt Lake | (Portugal) Paços de Ferreira | Free |
| 31 January 2012 | (Portugal) Yannick Djaló | (Portugal) Sporting CP | (Portugal) Benfica | Free |
| 31 January 2012 | (Morocco) Faouzi Abdelghni | (Portugal) Vitória de Guimarães | (Saudi Arabia) Al-Ittihad | Loan |
| 31 January 2012 | (Portugal) Jorge Chula | (Portugal) União de Leiria | (Portugal) SC Covilhã | Loan |
| 31 January 2012 | (Brazil) Cláudio Pitbull | (Portugal) Vitória de Setúbal | (Turkey) Manisaspor | Free |
| 31 January 2012 | (Cape Verde) Zé Luís | (Portugal) SC Braga | (Portugal) Gil Vicente | Loan |
| 31 January 2012 | (Bulgaria) Valeri Bojinov | (Portugal) Sporting CP | (Italy) Lecce | Loan |
| 31 January 2012 | (Colombia) Fredy Guarín | (Portugal) FC Porto | (Italy) Inter Milan | Loan |
| 31 January 2012 | (Argentina) Fernando Belluschi | (Portugal) FC Porto | (Italy) Genoa | Loan |
| 31 January 2012 | (Sweden) Niklas Bärkroth | (Sweden) Göteborg | (Portugal) Benfica | Undisclosed |
| 31 January 2012 | (Portugal) César Peixoto | (Portugal) Benfica | (Portugal) Gil Vicente | Free |
| 31 January 2012 | (Portugal) Tiago Targino | (Portugal) Vitória de Guimarães | (Portugal) Vitória de Setúbal | Loan |
| 31 January 2012 | (Brazil) Mayko | (Brazil) Palmeiras | (Portugal) CD Nacional | Free |
| 31 January 2012 | (Brazil) Saulo | (Portugal) Rio Ave | (Portugal) Académica de Coimbra | Free |
| 31 January 2012 | (Portugal) Jorge Lopes | (Moldova) Dacia Chişinău | (Portugal) Olhanense | Free |
| 31 January 2012 | (Portugal) Fábio Faria | (Portugal) Benfica | (Portugal) Rio Ave | Loan |
| 31 January 2012 | (Argentina) Lucho González | (France) Marseille | (Portugal) FC Porto | Free |
| 31 January 2012 | (Austria) Marc Janko | (Netherlands) Twente | (Portugal) FC Porto | €3,000,000 |
| 31 January 2012 | (Paraguay) Julio Aguilar | (Paraguay) Independiente | (Portugal) Paços de Ferreira | Free |
| 31 January 2012 | (Portugal) Tiago Barros | (Portugal) Beira-Mar | (Portugal) Tondela | Loan |
| 31 January 2012 | (Guinea-Bissau) Édson | (Portugal) Beira-Mar | (Portugal) Santa Clara | Loan |
| 31 January 2012 | (Brazil) Laionel | (Portugal) Gil Vicente | (Romania) Astra Ploiești | Free |
| 31 January 2012 | (Sweden) Niklas Bärkroth | (Portugal) Benfica | (Portugal) União de Leiria | Loan |
| 9 February 2012 | (Argentina) Enzo Pérez | (Portugal) Benfica | (Argentina) Estudiantes | Loan |
| 9 February 2012 | (Brazil) Souza | (Portugal) FC Porto | (Brazil) Grêmio | Loan |

- ^1 Player who signed with club before 1 January officially joined his new club on 1 January 2012, while player who joined after 1 January joined his new club following his signature of the contract.
