= Juan Manuel (disambiguation) =

Juan Manuel (1282–1349) was a nephew of King Alfonso X el Sabio

Juan Manuel may also refer to:

- Juan Manuel Rodríguez (1771–1847), Salvadoran revolutionary
- Juan Manuel de Rosas (1793–1877), Argentine governor
- Juan Manuel Fangio (1911–1995), Argentine racing driver
- Juan Manuel Santos (born 1951), Former president of Colombia
- Juan Manuel Fangio II (born 1956), Argentine racecar driver
- Juan Manuel Márquez (born 1973), Mexican professional boxer
- Juan Manuel Mendoza (born 1980), Colombian television actor
- Juan Manuel Correa (born 1999), Ecuadorian racing driver
- Juan Manuel (album), the second album by Plastilina Mosh

== See also ==
- João Manuel (disambiguation)
