= João Manuel =

João Manuel may refer to:

- João Manuel (bishop of Guarda) (1416–1476)
- João Manuel, Prince of Portugal (1537–1554)
- João Manuel (footballer, born 1967) (1967-2005), Portuguese footballer
- João Manuel (footballer, born 1994), Portuguese footballer
