= Pedro Oldoni =

Brazilian footballer

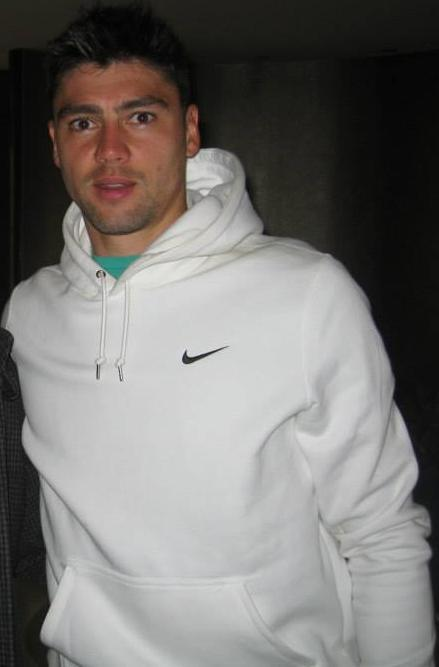
- Pedro Oldoni playing for Sivasspor in 2014

Personal information
- Full name: Pedro Henrique Oldoni do Nascimento
- Date of birth: 26 September 1985 (age 41)
- Place of birth: Pato Branco, Paraná, Brazil
- Height: 1.91 m (6 ft 3 in)
- Position: Striker

Youth career
- 2003–2004: Cianorte

Senior career*
Years	Team	Apps	(Gls)
2004–2005	Cianorte		
2005–2013	Atlético Paranaense	60	(21)
2009	→ Valladolid (loan)	6	(1)
2009	→ Atlético Mineiro (loan)	4	(0)
2010–2011	→ Nacional (loan)	12	(2)
2013–2014	Vitória	5	(1)
2014	Sivasspor	7	(0)
2014	Portuguesa	2	(0)
2015	Macaé	0	(0)
2015	Anapolina	8	(1)
2015	Caxias	7	(1)
2016	Atlético Paranaense	0	(0)
2016	→ Al-Dhaid (loan)	?	(?)
2016–2017	Itabaiana	4	(1)
2017	El Ejido 2012	2	(0)
2018	Anapolina	0	(0)
2018–	Sertãozinho	0	(0)
- * Club domestic league appearances and goals as of 21 December 2017

Pedro Henrique Oldoni do Nascimento (born 26 September 1985), known as Pedro Oldoni, is a Brazilian former footballer who played for Sertãozinho as a striker.

== Club career ==
Oldoni was born in Pato Branco, Paraná. He made his senior debuts with local Cianorte, before moving to state giants Atlético Paranaense in 2005.

After failing to establish himself into the starting XI, Oldoni moved to La Liga side Real Valladolid on loan on 31 January 2009. He made his debut on 15 February, coming on as a late substitute in a 2–3 loss at UD Almería. He was sparingly used during the campaign, as the Castile and León side narrowly avoided relegation.

On 27 July, Oldoni joined Atlético Mineiro also in a temporary deal. In January of the following year he changed teams and countries again, joining C.D. Nacional also in a loan deal. He returned to Furacão in August 2011, and spent almost a year nursing a knee injury.

Oldoni returned to the fields only in the 2012 summer, and was assigned to Atlético's B-team. In January 2013 he moved to Vitória in a permanent deal, but left the club a year later, joining Turkish Süper Lig side Sivasspor.

On 18 June 2014 Oldoni returned to Brazil, signing a short-term deal with Portuguesa. On 16 December, after appearing rarely, he joined Macaé Esporte, which had been recently promoted from Série C.
