= Bruno Patacas =

Portuguese footballer

Personal information
- Full name: Bruno Alexandre dos Santos Patacas
- Date of birth: 30 November 1977 (age 48)
- Place of birth: Vila Franca de Xira, Portugal
- Height: 1.76 m (5 ft 9 in)
- Position: Right-back

Youth career
- 1988–1996: Sporting CP

Senior career*
Years	Team	Apps	(Gls)
1996–2000	Sporting CP	7	(0)
1996–1997	→ Lourinhanense (loan)	15	(0)
1999	→ Lourinhanense (loan)	17	(1)
1999–2000	→ Santa Clara (loan)	23	(1)
2000–2002	Campomaiorense	52	(0)
2002–2011	Nacional	229	(4)
Total		343	(6)

International career
1997–1998	Portugal U20	14	(0)
1998–1999	Portugal U21	17	(0)
- * Club domestic league appearances and goals

Bruno Alexandre dos Santos Patacas (born 30 November 1977) is a Portuguese retired professional footballer who played as a right-back.

After starting his career with Sporting CP, he went on to represent other clubs before settling with Nacional, where he remained for nearly one decade whilst appearing in almost 300 competitive matches.

== Club career ==
A Sporting CP youth graduate, Patacas was born in Vila Franca de Xira, Lisbon. He spent his first professional season with farm team S.C. Lourinhanense, not being very successful upon his return to the alma mater (three games during parts of 1997–98 and four more in the following, while also spending time at Lourinhanense).

Patacas was released after one more loan stint, with C.D. Santa Clara, moving on to S.C. Campomaiorense – both these sides were also in the Primeira Liga– and then C.D. Nacional in the 2002–03 campaign, being an undisputed starter and often the only Portuguese player in the latter's starting XI, in a squad filled with Brazilians. He was also eventually awarded club captaincy.

In 2007, a transfer was almost arranged with PFC CSKA Sofia, but Patacas ultimately stayed at the Estádio da Madeira. He totalled a further 55 league appearances over the following two seasons for the Madeirans, and qualified for the UEFA Europa League in the second.

At the end of 2010–11, Patacas announced his retirement due to injuries, at the age of 33. He was immediately appointed Nacional's director of football, leaving his position on 12 September 2015.
