= Femi Joseph =

Nigerian footballer

Personal information
- Full name: Joseph Femi Olatubosun
- Date of birth: December 21, 1990 (age 35)
- Place of birth: Kawo, Nigeria
- Height: 1.84 m (6 ft 1/2 in)
- Position: Midfielder

Team information
- Current team: Academica Petroleos do Lobito
- Number: 11

Youth career
- 2000–2007: Pepsi Football Academy

Senior career*
Years	Team	Apps	(Gls)
2000–2007	Pepsi Football Academy		
2008–2010	Liberty Professionals F.C.		(8)
2009	→ Caála		
2010–2015	Caála		
2015	Ayia Napa	9	(1)

International career
2005–2007	Nigeria U-17	21	(9)
- * Club domestic league appearances and goals as of 16:14, 29 December 2015 (UTC)

Joseph Femi Olatubosun (born December 21, 1990, in Kawo, Kaduna State) is a Nigerian footballer.

== Career ==
Olatubosun began his career with the Pepsi Football Academy and joined on 6 November 2008. Liberty Professionals F.C. He left Liberty Professionals F.C. on 21 February 2009 and signed with Girabola Club Caála. In January 2010 he was sold by Liberty Professionals.

== International career ==
He is a former member of the Nigeria national under-17 football team and represented the team in an 8 Nations Tournament in South Korea.
