= Rui Maurício =

Portuguese footballer (born 1985)

Personal information
- Full name: Rui Carlos Tavares Maurício
- Date of birth: 4 July 1985 (age 41)
- Place of birth: Almada, Portugal
- Height: 1.84 m (6 ft 1/2 in)
- Position: Defender

Team information
- Current team: Pinhalnovense
- Number: 99

Youth career
- 2002–2004: Pescadores Caparica

Senior career*
| Years | Team | Apps | (Gls) |
| 2004–2006 | Pescadores Caparica | | |
| 2006–2008 | Cova da Piedade | | |
| 2009 | Eléctrico | | |
| 2009 | Atlético CP | | |
| 2009–2012 | Recreativo da Caála | | |
| 2013 | Recreativo do Libolo | 3 | (0) |
| 2015 | Cova da Piedade | 12 | (0) |
| 2015–2016 | Atlético CP | 10 | (0) |
| 2016 | Académica do Lobito | 4 | (0) |
| 2016– | Pinhalnovense | 19 | (0) |
- * Club domestic league appearances and goals as of 2 April 2017

Rui Carlos Tavares Maurício (born 4 July 1985) is a Portuguese football player who plays for Pinhalnovense. He also holds Angolan citizenship.

== Club career ==
He made his professional debut in the Segunda Liga for Atlético CP on 8 August 2015 in a game against Freamunde.
