= Buba Yohanna =

Cameroonian footballer (born 1982)

Personal information
- Date of birth: 12 June 1982 (age 44)
- Place of birth: Balong, Cameroon
- Height: 1.85 m (6 ft 1 in)
- Position: Defender

Senior career*
Years	Team	Apps	(Gls)
1999–2001	Canon Yaoundé	36	(0)
2001–2002	Fenerbahçe Yaoundé	27	(4)
2002–2003	Altay S.K.	6	(0)
2003–2005	GD Estoril-Praia	61	(7)
2006–2008	S.C. Beira-Mar	14	(4)
2008–2009	Gondomar S.C.	24	(0)
2010–2012	Caála		
2012–2013	Sporting Covilhã		
- * Club domestic league appearances and goals

Buba Yohanna (born 12 June 1982 in Balong) is a Cameroonian professional footballer.

== Club career ==
Buba has played for several clubs in Europe, including Altay S.K. in the Turkish Super Lig and S.C. Beira-Mar in the Portuguese Liga. He also played for Clube Recreativo da Caála in the Angolan league.
