= Cléber (footballer, born 1980) =

Brazilian footballer

Personal information
- Full name: Cléber Monteiro de Oliveira
- Date of birth: 23 May 1980 (age 46)
- Place of birth: Belo Horizonte, Brazil
- Height: 1.80 m (5 ft 11 in)
- Position: Midfielder

Youth career
- Cruzeiro

Senior career*
Years	Team	Apps	(Gls)
1999–2003	Cruzeiro	32	(1)
2002	→ Criciúma (loan)		
2003–2010	Nacional	183	(4)
2010–2011	Vitória Guimarães	24	(0)
2011–2012	Cartagena	11	(0)
2012	Juventude	0	(0)
2013	Villa Nova-MG	8	(0)
Total		258	(5)
- * Club domestic league appearances and goals

Cléber Monteiro de Oliveira (born 23 May 1980 in Belo Horizonte, Minas Gerais), known simply as Cléber, is a Brazilian former professional footballer who played mainly as a defensive midfielder. He also held Portuguese citizenship, due to the many years spent in that country.
