= Felipe Lopes =

Brazilian footballer (born 1987)

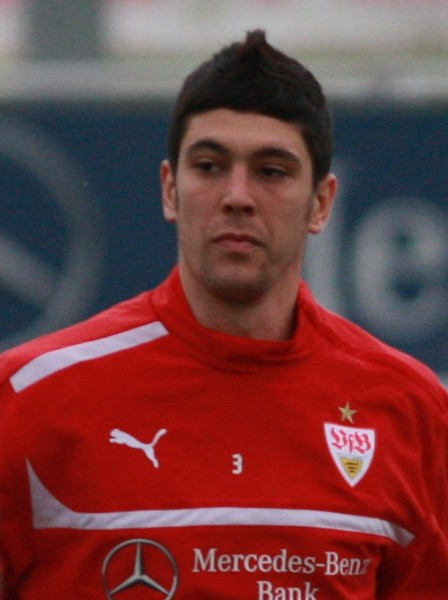
- Lopes as a VfB Stuttgart player

Personal information
- Full name: Felipe Aliste Lopes
- Date of birth: 7 August 1987 (age 39)
- Place of birth: Osasco, Brazil
- Height: 1.89 m (6 ft 2 in)
- Position: Centre-back

Youth career
- Guarani

Senior career*
Years	Team	Apps	(Gls)
2005–2006	Guarani	24	(0)
2006–2007	Anderlecht	0	(0)
2007–2012	Nacional	98	(4)
2012–2016	VfL Wolfsburg	14	(0)
2013	→ VfB Stuttgart (loan)	3	(0)
2016–2017	Chaves	6	(0)
2017–2020	Nacional	33	(2)
Total		178	(6)
- * Club domestic league appearances and goals

Felipe Aliste Lopes (born 7 August 1987) is a Brazilian former professional footballer who played as a centre-back.

He also possessed Portuguese nationality due to the many years spent in the country with Nacional, with which he appeared in 181 official matches and scored nine goals.

== Club career ==
Born in Osasco, São Paulo, Lopes started playing professionally with Guarani FC, competing with the club in the Série B. In 2006, aged only 19, he moved abroad and joined R.S.C. Anderlecht, being part of the squad that won the Belgian Pro League but failing to make an appearance.

In the summer of 2007, Lopes signed for C.D. Nacional in Portugal, making his Primeira Liga debut on 21 December that year, starting in a 1–0 home win against FC Porto and being sent off in the 87th minute. He finished his first season, however, with only seven league games (eight in all competitions).

Lopes became first-choice for the Madeirans subsequently, in a roster filled with compatriots. He appeared in 25 matches in the 2008–09 campaign as the team finished in a best-ever fourth position with the subsequent qualification for the UEFA Europa League, and bettered those totals in the following years.

On 5 January 2012, Lopes agreed to a three-and-a-half-year contract at VfL Wolfsburg for an undisclosed fee. He made his Bundesliga debut on 21 January in a 1–0 home victory over 1. FC Köln, playing the full 90 minutes.

On 22 January 2013, Lopes was loaned out to fellow top-division side VfB Stuttgart until the end of the season, with the club securing an option to sign him permanently in June, but finally not activating the clause. Returned to the Volkswagen Arena, he did not make a single competitive appearance in two years after suffering a stroke while he watched the third-place play-off of the 2014 FIFA World Cup (he also did not collect one single minute in 2013–14).

Lopes returned to Portugal and its top division in summer 2016, agreeing to a one-year deal with newly promoted G.D. Chaves. He rejoined Nacional ahead of the 2017–18 season, achieving promotion from the LigaPro.
