= Douglas Pajetat =

Cameroonian footballer

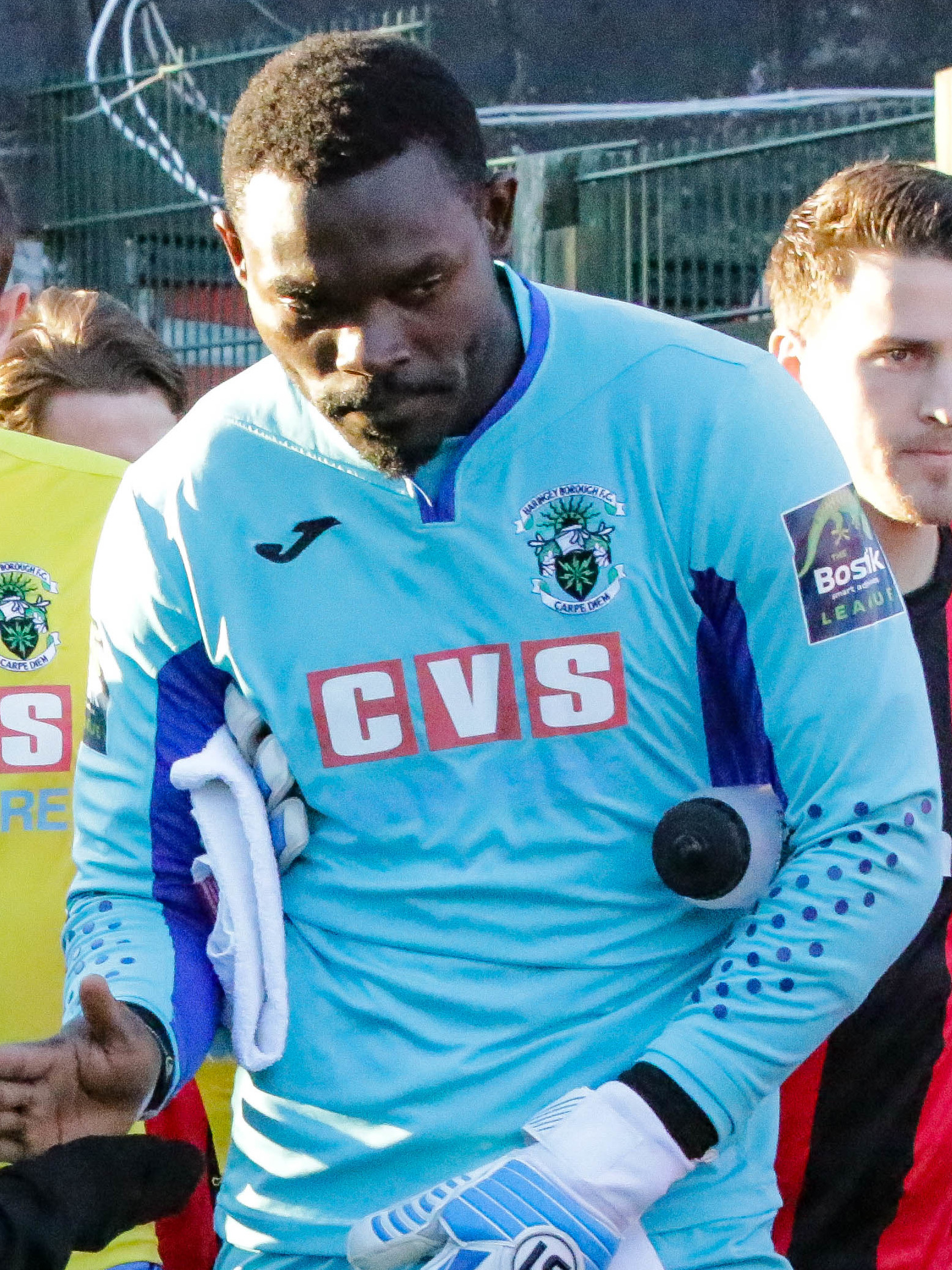
- Pajetat in November 2018

Personal information
- Full name: Valery Douglas Pajetat
- Date of birth: 17 February 1986 (age 40)
- Place of birth: Yaoundé, Cameroon
- Height: 1.90 m (6 ft 3 in)
- Position: Goalkeeper

Senior career*
Years	Team	Apps	(Gls)
2004–2005	Renaissance		
2005–2006	Impôts		
2006–2008	Sporting Pombal	3	(0)
2008–2010	Nacional	0	(0)
2010–2011	Freamunde	4	(0)
2011–2012	Feirense	4	(0)
2013	Espinho	1	(0)
2013–2014	Famalicão	9	(0)
2016–2017	Margate		
2017–2021	Haringey Borough		
- * Club domestic league appearances and goals as of 19 November 2017

Valery Douglas Pajetat (born 17 February 1986) is a Cameroonian footballer who played as a goalkeeper for English club Haringey Borough.

On 19 October 2019, an FA Cup qualifying match between Haringey Borough and Yeovil Town was abandoned after Pajetat said that Yeovil fans racially abused him. including spitting and bottle throwing. Haringey's defender Coby Rowe also made accusations. Both teams walked off the pitch.
