= Luís Alberto (footballer, born 1983) =

Brazilian footballer

Personal information
- Full name: Luís Alberto Silva dos Santos
- Date of birth: 17 November 1983 (age 42)
- Place of birth: Salvador, Brazil
- Height: 1.84 m (6 ft 0 in)
- Position: Midfielder

Youth career
- 2001–2002: Bahia

Senior career*
Years	Team	Apps	(Gls)
2003–2006	Bahia	48	(4)
2005–2006	→ Ettifaq (loan)		
2007	São Caetano	16	(1)
2007–2008	Cruzeiro	8	(0)
2008–2012	Nacional	81	(5)
2012–2014	Braga	2	(0)
2012–2013	→ CFR Cluj (loan)	8	(2)
2013	→ Vitória (loan)	9	(0)
2014	Kashima Antlers	16	(2)
2015–2016	Tondela	22	(3)
2016	Chaves	1	(0)
2017	Aves	11	(1)
2017–2018	Académico Viseu	1	(0)
2018	Varzim	8	(0)
Total		231	(18)
- * Club domestic league appearances and goals

Luís Alberto Silva dos Santos (born 17 November 1983), known as Luís Alberto, is a Brazilian former professional footballer who played as a midfielder.

He spent the better part of his 15-year senior career in Portugal, representing seven clubs.

== Club career ==
Luís Alberto was born in Salvador, Bahia. In his country, he first played for Esporte Clube Bahia, Associação Desportiva São Caetano and Cruzeiro Esporte Clube, being part of Série A rosters with the first and last clubs, where he was often criticised for his propensity to be sent off. Additionally, he served a loan at Saudi Professional League club Ettifaq FC.

In late July 2008, Luís Alberto signed a five-year contract with C.D. Nacional of the Portuguese Primeira Liga, who acquired 50% of his sporting rights. He played his first game in the competition on 24 August, in a 3–1 away win against Leixões S.C. where he earned praise. His first goal came on 23 November in the 1–0 home victory over C.D. Trofense, and in his first year he also helped his team reach the semi-finals of the Taça de Portugal and qualify for the play-off round of the UEFA Europa League after a best-ever fourth-place finish.

Luis Alberto made his continental debut on 20 August 2009, opening the 4–3 home defeat of FC Zenit Saint Petersburg (eventually 5–4 on aggregate). In January 2012, he joined S.C. Braga of the same country and league on a three-and-a-half-year deal, being then consecutively loaned by that side to Romania's CFR Cluj and Esporte Clube Vitória in his country's top division. Whilst at Cluj, he memorably scored the only goal at Old Trafford against Manchester United in the group stage of the UEFA Champions League.

Following a brief spell in the Japanese J1 League, Luís Alberto returned to the Portuguese top division in July 2015, with C.D. Tondela. One year later, he moved to fellow league club G.D. Chaves.

Luís Alberto competed in the LigaPro until his retirement at the age of 35, representing in quick succession C.D. Aves, Académico de Viseu F.C. and Varzim SC.

== Honours ==
Cruzeiro

- Campeonato Mineiro: 2008

Vitória

- Campeonato Baiano: 2013
