= João Manuel (footballer, born 1994) =

Portuguese footballer

Personal information
- Full name: João Leitão Gonçalves Manuel
- Date of birth: 28 May 1994 (age 32)
- Place of birth: Oeiras, Portugal
- Height: 1.82 m (6 ft 0 in)
- Position: Goalkeeper

Team information
- Current team: 1º Dezembro
- Number: 1

Youth career
- 2006–2007: Sporting CP
- 2007–2011: Belenenses
- 2011–2012: SC Linda-a-Velha
- 2012–2013: Estoril

Senior career*
| Years | Team | Apps | (Gls) |
| 2011–2012 | SC Linda-a-Velha | 2 | (0) |
| 2013−2015 | Estoril | 1 | (0) |
| 2014–2015 | → Atlético CP (loan) | 3 | (0) |
| 2015 | Recreativo da Caála | | |
| 2016 | Sertanense | 0 | (0) |
| 2016– | 1º Dezembro | 20 | (0) |
- * Club domestic league appearances and goals as of 9 April 2017

João Leitão Gonçalves Manuel (born 28 May 1994) is a Portuguese footballer who plays for 1º Dezembro as a goalkeeper.

== Career ==
On 4 May 2014, Manuel made his professional debut with Estoril Praia in a 2013–14 Primeira Liga match against Belenenses.
