= Anselmo Cardoso =

Portuguese footballer

Anselmo
Personal information
- Full name: Anselmo Gonçalves Cardoso
- Date of birth: 6 January 1984 (age 42)
- Place of birth: Freiria, Portugal
- Height: 1.82 m (5 ft 11 1/2 in)
- Position: Striker

Youth career
- 1995–2000: Torreense
- 2000–2001: Freiria

Senior career*
Years	Team	Apps	(Gls)
2001–2002	Freiria	5	(5)
2002–2005	Torreense	83	(26)
2005–2009	Estrela Amadora	81	(15)
2009–2012	Nacional	36	(4)
2012	→ Rio Ave (loan)	6	(0)
2012–2013	Tractor Sazi	6	(1)
2013–2014	Portimonense	32	(7)
2014–2015	Al-Mesaimeer	18	(19)
2016–2017	Alta de Lisboa		
Total		267	(77)
- * Club domestic league appearances and goals

Anselmo Gonçalves Cardoso (born 6 January 1984 in Freiria, Torres Vedras), known simply as Anselmo, is a Portuguese former professional footballer who played as a striker.
