= Hugo Costa (footballer, born 1990) =

Portuguese footballer

Personal information
- Full name: Hugo Miguel Gonçalves Costa
- Date of birth: 20 February 1990 (age 36)
- Place of birth: Póvoa de Varzim, Portugal
- Height: 1.80 m (5 ft 11 in)
- Position: Left back

Team information
- Current team: Cerveira
- Number: 55

Youth career
- 2000–2009: Varzim

Senior career*
Years	Team	Apps	(Gls)
2009–2011	Varzim	16	(0)
2011–2013	Feirense	0	(0)
2011–2012	→ Tondela (loan)	7	(0)
2013–2014	Freamunde	6	(0)
2013–2014	→ Boavista (loan)	7	(1)
2014	Caála		
2014–2016	Mafra	7	(0)
2016–2017	Lusitano Vildemoinhos	40	(1)
2017	Salgueiros	14	(0)
2018	Felgueiras 1932	0	(0)
2018	Canelas 2010	9	(1)
2018	Cinfães	12	(0)
2019	Vilaverdense	14	(0)
2019–	Cerveira	29	(0)

International career
2011	Portugal U21	3	(0)
- * Club domestic league appearances and goals as of 17:25, 26 January 2021 (UTC)

Hugo Miguel Gonçalves Costa (born 20 February 1990) is a Portuguese professional footballer who plays for C.D. Cerveira as a left back.

== Career ==
Born in Póvoa de Varzim, Costa came through the ranks of hometown club Varzim SC. He was an unused substitute for several Liga de Honra games in 2009–10, and played 16 games as they were relegated a year later.

Costa then signed for Primeira Liga club C.D. Feirense in 2011, who immediately loaned him to C.D. Tondela in the third tier. He made his only appearances for the parent club in 2012–13, two games in the Taça da Liga.

In January 2013, Costa signed for S.C. Freamunde of the second division, before then joining Boavista F.C. in the third. On 24 August, he scored on his debut to open a 3–1 win at U.D. Sousense.

Halfway through the 2014–15 season, Costa joined C.D. Mafra, and helped the club win the third division title. Having only played a game in each cup the following season, he joined Lusitano FCV in February 2016. He remained in that tier for the following years, with quick spells at S.C. Salgueiros, F.C. Felgueiras 1932, C.F. Canelas 2010, C.D. Cinfães, Vilaverdense F.C. and C.D. Cerveira.
