= Maykon =

Brazilian footballer (born 1984)

Personal information
- Full name: Maykon Daniel Elias Araújo
- Date of birth: 20 April 1984 (age 42)
- Place of birth: Araranguá, Brazil
- Height: 1.79 m (5 ft 10 1/2 in)
- Position: Midfielder

Senior career*
Years	Team	Apps	(Gls)
2003–2007	Paulista		
2007	→ América (loan)		
2008	Goianiense		
2008	Gama	0	(0)
2008–2009	Belenenses	10	(0)
2009–2011	Paços Ferreira	46	(6)
2011	União Leiria	11	(1)
2012–2013	AEL Limassol	15	(4)
2014	Ottawa Fury	12	(0)
Total		94	(11)
- * Club domestic league appearances and goals

Maykon Daniel Elias Araújo (born 20 April 1984), known simply as Maykon, is a Brazilian former professional footballer who played as a left midfielder.
