= 2012–13 Taça de Portugal =

Tournament details
- Country: Portugal
- Teams: 165

Final positions
- Champions: Vitória de Guimarães (1st title)
- Runners-up: Benfica

Tournament statistics
- Matches played: 163
- Goals scored: 484 (2.97 per match)
- Top goal scorer(s): Óscar Cardozo; Ricardo (6 goals each)

The 2012–13 Taça de Portugal was the 73rd season of the Taça de Portugal, the premier Portuguese football knockout cup competition organized by the Portuguese Football Federation (FPF). It was contested by a total of 162 teams competing in the top four tiers of Portuguese football. The competition began with the first round matches in August 2012 and concluded with the final on 26 May 2013, at the Estádio Nacional in Oeiras.

Vitória de Guimarães were the winners, following their 2–1 defeat of Benfica. They secured their first title in the competition after five previous failed attempts and became the twelfth team to win the Taça de Portugal – the first first-time winners since Beira-Mar in 1999. With this victory, Vitória de Guimarães qualified for the 2013–14 UEFA Europa League group stage.

Académica de Coimbra were the defending champions after defeating Sporting CP 1–0 in the previous season's final, but were eliminated in the quarter-finals by Benfica.

== Format ==
As in the previous season, the competition format was organized in a knockout system consisting of seven rounds, which preceded the final match. Teams competing in the Segunda Divisão and Terceira Divisão, respectively the third and fourth tiers of Portuguese football, entered the competition in the first round. In the second round, Segunda Liga teams were joined by the first round winners and the remaining Second and/or Third Division teams that received a bye in the previous round. The second round winners advanced to the third round, where they met the top tier Primeira Liga teams for the first time. Unlike the previous rounds, which were contested in one-legged fixtures, the semi-finals were played over two legs in a home-and-away basis. The final was played at a neutral venue, the Estádio Nacional in Oeiras.

Round	Teams remaining	Teams involved	Winners from previous round	New entries this round	Leagues entering this round
First Round	162	100	none	100	Segunda Divisão; Terceira Divisão
Second Round	112	96	50	46	Segunda Liga
Third Round	64	64	48	16	Primeira Liga
Fourth Round	32	32	32	none	none
Fifth Round	16	16	16	none	none
Quarterfinals	8	8	8	none	none
Semifinals	4	4	4	none	none
Final	2	2	2	none	none

== Teams ==
A total of 162 teams from the top four tiers of the national football system from were considered eligible by FPF to participate in the competition:

Primeira Liga (16 teams)
- Académica de Coimbra
- Beira-Mar
- Benfica
- Gil Vicente
- Estoril
- Marítimo
- Moreirense
- Nacional
- Olhanense
- Paços de Ferreira
- Porto
- Rio Ave
- Sporting CP
- Braga
- Vitória de Guimarães
- Vitória de Setúbal
Segunda Liga (16 teams)
- Arouca
- Atlético CP
- Belenenses
- Desportivo das Aves
- Feirense
- Freamunde
- Leixões
- Naval
- Oliveirense
- Penafiel
- Portimonense
- Santa Clara
- Sporting da Covilhã
- Tondela
- Trofense
- União da Madeira
Second Division (48 teams)

North (16 teams)

- Amarante
- Boavista
- Chaves
- Fafe
- Famalicão
- Gondomar
- Infesta
- Joane
- Limianos
- Mirandela
- Padroense
- Ribeirão
- Tirsense
- Varzim
- Vilaverdense
- Vizela

Centre (16 teams)

- Académico de Viseu
- Anadia
- Benfica Castelo Branco
- Bustelo
- Cesarense
- Cinfães
- Coimbrões
- Lusitânia
- Nogueirense
- Operário
- Pampilhosa
- São João de Ver
- Sousense
- Sporting de Espinho
- Tocha
- Tourizense

South (16 teams)

- 1º de Dezembro
- Carregado
- Casa Pia
- Farense
- Fátima
- Futebol Benfica
- Louletano
- Mafra
- Oeiras
- Oriental
- Pinhalnovense
- Quarteirense
- Ribeira Brava
- Sertanense
- Torreense
- União de Leiria
Third Division (82 teams)

Series A (12 teams)

- Bragança
- Caçadores das Taipas
- Desportivo de Ronfe
- Esposende
- Monção
- Maria da Fonte
- Santa Maria
- Marinhas
- Melgacense
- Merelinense
- Ponte da Barca
- Vianense

Series B (12 teams)

- Aliados de Lordelo
- Felgueiras 1932
- Leça
- Lousada
- Oliveirense
- Paredes
- Pedras Rubras
- Rebordosa
- Santa Eulália
- Serzedelo
- Vila Meã
- Vila Real

Series C (12 teams)

- Aguiar da Beira
- Alba
- Avanca
- Estarreja
- Grijó
- Oliveira do Bairro
- Oliveira de Frades
- Parada
- Penalva do Castelo
- Salgueiros 08
- Sampedrense
- União de Lamas

Series D (12 teams)

- Alcanenense
- Alcobaça
- Beneditense
- Caldas
- Marinhense
- Mortágua
- Oliveira do Hospital
- Penelense
- Sourense
- Sporting de Pombal
- Torres Novas
- Vitória de Sernache

Series E (12 teams)

- Amora
- Barreirense
- Cartaxo
- Eléctrico
- Fabril Barreiro
- Lourinhanense
- Peniche
- Pêro Pinheiro
- Real
- Sacavenense
- Sintrense
- União de Tires

Series F (12 teams)

- Aljustrelense
- Atlético de Reguengos
- Castrense
- Esperança de Lagos
- Lagoa
- Juventude de Évora
- Lusitano VRSA
- Monte do Trigo
- União de Montemor
- Moura
- Sesimbra
- Vasco da Gama

Azores Series (10 teams)

- Angrense
- Barreiro
- Flamengos
- Marítimo da Graciosa
- Praiense
- Prainha
- Rabo de Peixe
- Santiago
- Sporting Ideal
- Vitória do Pico

== Schedule ==
All draws were held at the FPF headquarters in Lisbon.

Round	Draw date	Main date	Fixtures	Teams	Prize money
First Round	2 August 2012	26 August 2012	50	162 → 112	€2,000
Second Round	31 August 2012	16 September 2012	48	112 → 64	€3,000
Third Round	25 September 2012	21 October 2012	32	64 → 32	€4,000
Fourth Round	29 October 2012	18 November 2012	16	32 → 16	€5,000
Fifth Round	20 November 2012	2 December 2012	8	16 → 8	€7,500
Quarterfinals	18 December 2012	16–17 January 2013	4	8 → 4	€10,000
Semifinals	18 December 2012	30 January 2013 (first leg); 17 April 2013 (second leg)	4	4 → 2	€15,000
Final	18 December 2012	26 May 2013	1	2 → 1	€150,000 (runner-up) €300,000 (winner)

== First round ==
Teams from the Segunda Divisão (II) and Terceira Divisão (III) entered in this initial round. The draw was made on 2 August 2012 and determined the 100 teams contesting this round and the remaining 30 teams with a bye into the second round. Matches were played mainly on 26 August, with a few taking place the day before and later on 9 September 2012.

The following 30 teams were given a bye into the second round:

- 1º de Dezembro (II)
- Aguiar da Beira (III)
- Amarante (II)
- Amora (III)
- Anadia (II)
- Benfica Castelo Branco (II)
- Cartaxo (III)
- Casa Pia (II)
- Coimbrões (II)
- Estarreja (III)
- Fafe (II)
- Lagoa (III)
- Leça (III)
- Marítimo da Graciosa (III)
- Monção (III)
- Oliveirense (III)
- Padroense (II)
- Pampilhosa (II)
- Paredes (III)
- Penalva do Castelo (III)
- Peniche (III)
- Ponte da Barca (III)
- Quarteirense (II)
- Sampedrense (III)
- Sourense (III)
- Sporting de Pombal (III)
- Tocha (II)
- União de Lamas (III)
- Vila Meã (III)
- Vitória do Pico (III)

Number of teams per league in competition before this round
Primeira Liga	Segunda Liga	Second Division	Third Division	Total
16 / 16	16 / 16	48 / 48	82 / 82	162 / 162

Lourinhanense, Melgacense, Santa Maria and Limianos were the only Third Division teams to eliminate opponents from the upper Second Division tier.

25 August 2012	Sousense (II)	2–0	Beneditense (III)	Estádio 1º de Dezembro, Gondomar
16:00	Chico 60'; Salvador 78'			Referee: Rui Amaral

25 August 2012	Santiago (III)	0–2	Bustelo (II)	Campo de Jogos José Mestre Leste, Lagoa, Azores
16:00			Dani Alves 77'; Gonzaga 82' (pen.)	Referee: Filipe Reis

25 August 2012	Barreiro (III)	1–0	Moura (III)	Campo do SC Barreiro, Angra do Heroísmo, Azores
16:00	Lhuka 75'			Referee: Duarte Cerveira

25 August 2012	Académico de Viseu (II)	6–0	Prainha (III)	Estádio do Fontelo, Viseu
17:00	Luisinho 26', 60'; Luís Cardoso 6', 29', 43'; Bruno Loureiro 88'			Referee: Sérgio Soares

26 August 2012	Operário (II)	3–1	Vila Real (III)	João Gualberto Borges Arruda, Lagoa, Azores
11:30	Hélder Arruda 54'; Evandro 66' (pen.); Daniel Sousa 85'		Abreu 30'	Referee: José Almeida

26 August 2012	Flamengos (III)	0–4	Sertanense (II)	Estádio do Vale, Horta, Azores
15:00			João Góis 13'; Mauro Bastos 7' (pen.), 82'; Alex 85'	Referee: João Pinto

26 August 2012	Oriental (II)	2–1	Juventude de Évora (III)	Campo Engenheiro Carlos Salema, Lisbon
16:00	Hyantony 28'; Tiago Mota 85'		Rúben Freire 9'	Referee: Hélder Malheiro

26 August 2012	Sintrense (III)	2–1	Lusitano VRSA (III)	Estádio do Sport União Sintrense, Sintra
16:00	André Cacito 10'; Emanuel 22'		Edgar Rosa 48'	Referee: João Luciano Cabral

26 August 2012	União de Montemor (III)	1–0	Oliveira de Frades (III)	Estádio 1º de Maio, Montemor-o-Novo
16:00				Referee: José Carlos Rodrigues

26 August 2012	Alba (III)	3–4	Vilaverdense (II)	Estádio Municipal António Augusto Martins Pereira, Albergaria-a-Velha
16:00	Zé Bastos 40'; Paulo Simões 70'; Sousa 90+4'		Ribeirinho 4'; Beré 17' (pen.), 24'; Nené 51' (o.g.)	Referee: Albano Correia

26 August 2012	Gondomar (II)	2–1	Cesarense (II)	Estádio de S. Miguel, Gondomar
16:00	Luís Neves 78' (pen.); Júlio César 90+3' (pen.)		Manuel Pinto 84' (pen.)	Referee: Pedro Vilaça

26 August 2012	Marinhense (III)	0–6	Alcanenense (III)	Estádio Municipal da Marinha Grande, Marinha Grande
16:00			João Magalhães 29', 78'; Enoh 54'	Referee: Raúl Sousa

26 August 2012	Sporting de Espinho (II)	1–0	União de Tires (III)	Comendador Manuel Violas, Espinho
16:00	Capela 56'			Referee: João Santos

26 August 2012	São João de Ver (II)	0–1	Ribeirão (II)	Estádio Sport Clube São João de Ver, Santa Maria da Feira
16:00			Rogger 66'	Referee: Pedro Maia

26 August 2012	Real (III)	0–1	Cinfães (II)	Complexo Desportivo do Real Sport Clube, Queluz
16:00			Rúben 45'	Referee: Hugo Serafim Silva

26 August 2012	Farense (II)	1–0 (a.e.t.)	Mafra (II)	Estádio de São Luís, Faro
16:00	Ibrahima Aka 96'			Referee: Luís Catita

26 August 2012	Serzedelo (III)	0–1	Caldas (III)	Campo das Oliveiras, Serzedelo (Guimarães)
16:00			Fábio Sabino 82'	Referee: Joel Miranda

26 August 2012	Parada (III)	2–3	Nogueirense (II)	Campo Nossa Senhora de Fátima, Castro Daire
16:00	Manú 61' (pen.); Reuss 90+1'		João Pedro 30'; Chano 75'; Zé Francisco 85'	Referee: António Costa

26 August 2012	Lourinhanense (III)	1–1 (a.e.t.) (4–3 p)	Carregado (II)	Estádio Municipal da Lourinhã, Lourinhã
16:00	Pedro Fonseca 118' (pen.)		Marmelo 102'	Referee: Tiago Martins

26 August 2012	Louletano (II)	4–2	Bragança (III)	Estádio do Algarve, Faro
16:00	Norberto 18', 45'; Bruno Mestre 84'; Chiquinho 90+6'		Tamsir Kane 51' (pen.), 63' (pen.)	Referee: Luís Reforço

26 August 2012	Aljustrelense (III)	0–1	Atlético de Reguengos (III)	Estádio Municipal de Aljustrel, Aljustrel
16:00			Diogo Oliveira 21'	Referee: Pedro Sancho

26 August 2012	Sacavenense (III)	3–0	Monte do Trigo (III)	Campo do Sacavenense, Sacavém
16:00				Referee: André Moreira

26 August 2012	Barreirense (III)	2–2 (a.e.t.) (4–5 p)	Oeiras (III)	Campo da Verderena, Barreiro
16:00	João Nuno 21'; China 52'		Leonel Filipe 5', 78'	Referee: Fábio Veríssimo

26 August 2012	Melgacense (III)	2–1 (a.e.t.)	Famalicão (II)	Centro de Estágios de Melgaço, Melgaço
16:00	Marcos 40'; Jorge Humberto 108' (pen.)		Rody 88'	Referee: António Ricardo Moreira

26 August 2012	Desportivo de Ronfe (III)	1–2	Pinhalnovense (II)	Estádio do Desportivo de Ronfe, Ronfe (Guimarães)
16:00	Vítor Vaz 40'		Pedro Neves 11'; Jony 15'	Referee: Pedro Campos

26 August 2012	Oliveira do Bairro (III)	2–2 (a.e.t.) (4–5 p)	Aliados de Lordelo (III)	Estádio Municipal de Oliveira do Bairro, Oliveira do Bairro
16:00	Alexis 51'; Luís Barreto 83'		Bezu 6'; Festas 10'	Referee: Nuno Silva

26 August 2012	Vianense (III)	0–1	Felgueiras 1932 (III)	Estádio Dr. José de Matos, Viana do Castelo
16:00			Ricardinho 15' (o.g.)	Referee: João Ricardo Silva

26 August 2012	Torreense (II)	2–2 (a.e.t.) (4–5 p)	Futebol Benfica (II)	Parque de Jogos Manuel Marques, Torres Vedras
16:00	Marco Neves 10'; Semedo 72'		Naia 19'; Lamas 90'	Referee: Rui Rodrigues

26 August 2012	Fátima (II)	2–0	Vitória de Sernache (III)	Estádio Municipal de Fátima, Fátima
16:00	Marocas 13', 50'			Referee: José Rodrigues

26 August 2012	Praiense (III)	2–0	Penelense (III)	Estádio Municipal da Praia da Vitória, Praia da Vitória, Azores
16:00	Marco Aurélio 2'; João Borges 23'			Referee: Paulo Martins

26 August 2012	Oliveira do Hospital (III)	3–2	Sporting Ideal (III)	Estádio Municipal de Oliveira do Hospital, Oliveira do Hospital
16:00				Referee: André Baltasar

26 August 2012	Esperança de Lagos (III)	1–1 (a.e.t.) (2–4 p)	Grijó (III)	Estádio Municipal de Lagos, Lagos
16:00	André Lourenço 90'		João Magalhães 88' (pen.)

26 August 2012	Mortágua (III)	0–1	Fabril Barreiro (III)	Campo da Gandarada, Mortágua
16:00			Danilo Serrano 79'	Referee: Bruno Costa

26 August 2012	Pêro Pinheiro (III)	2–1	Maria da Fonte (III)	Parque de Jogos Pardal Monteiro, Sintra
16:00				Referee: André Almeida

26 August 2012	Vasco da Gama (III)	3–2	Caçadores das Taipas (III)	Estádio Municipal de Vidigueira, Vidigueira
16:00			Miguel 55'; Nélson 78'	Referee: Fábio Varanda

26 August 2012	Angrense (III)	1–2	Vizela (II)	Estadio Municipal de Angra do Heroismo, Angra do Heroísmo, Azores
16:00	Rúben Rodrigues 90+3'		Ferraz 57', 80'	Referee: Paulo Barradas

26 August 2012	Avanca (III)	5–0	Esposende (III)	Parque Desportivo da Associação Atlética de Avanca, Avanca
16:00	Tiago Amaral 4'; João Couras 11'; Veiros 26'; Luís Bornes 28'; Cassamá 90+2'			Referee: João Pedro Calado

26 August 2012	Castrense (III)	0–2	Eléctrico (III)	Estádio Municipal 25 de Abril, Castro Verde
16:00			Yoruba 31'; André Dias 45'	Referee: Nuno Croino

26 August 2012	Infesta (II)	2–2 (a.e.t.) (3–5 p)	Chaves (II)	Parque de Jogos Manuel Ramos, Senhora da Hora
16:00	Vitinha I 90+2'; Digas 100'		Gustavo Souza 85'; Rui Raínho 112'	Referee: Daniel Cardoso

26 August 2012	Merelinense (III)	2–3	Mirandela (II)	Estádio João Soares Vieira, Merelim (Braga)
16:00	Afonso 78'; Rondinele 90' (o.g.)		Rui Lopes 60'; Leandro 71' (pen.); Nuno Corunha 90+2'	Referee: Rui Patrício

26 August 2012	Santa Eulália (III)	3–1 (a.e.t.)	Rebordosa (III)	Campo Municipal de Santa Eulália, Vizela
16:00	Élio 54'; Zézé 95'; André Cunha 103'		Bessa 21'	Referee: Nelson Cunha

26 August 2012	Lusitânia (II)	0–1	Santa Maria (III)	Estádio João Paulo II, Angra do Heroísmo, Azores
16:00			Rui Gomes 32'	Referee: Sílvio Gouveia

26 August 2012	Joane (II)	0–1	Limianos (III)	Estádio de Barreiros, Joane, Vila Nova de Famalicão
16:00			Vasco 10'	Referee: Pedro Ferreira

26 August 2012	Tirsense (II)	5–1	Sesimbra (II)	Estádio Abel Alves de Figueiredo, Santo Tirso
16:00	Pedro Maurício 17'; Pedro Tiba 6' (pen.), 60'; Rui Luís 80'; André Soares 90'		Hugo Graça 25'	Referee: Rui Fernandes

26 August 2012	Pedras Rubras (III)	4–1	Alcobaça (III)	Estádio Municipal de Pedras Rubras, Pedras Rubras (Matosinhos)
16:00	Ricardinho 7'; Biscoito 50'; André Oliveira 52'; João Paulo 88'		Fábio Félix 34' (pen.)	Referee: Vítor Silva

26 August 2012	Rabo de Peixe (III)	0–2	Tourizense (II)	Estádio do Bom Jesus, Rabo de Peixe, Azores
17:00			Alemão 23'; Kané 79'	Referee: Carlos Dias

26 August 2012	Lousada (III)	1–1 (a.e.t.) (2–4 p)	Salgueiros 08 (III)	Estádio Municipal de Lousada, Lousada
17:00	João Carvalho 89'		Quim Ferraz 18'	Referee: Tiago Costa

9 September 2012	Varzim (II)	5–1	Marinhas (III)	Estádio do Varzim, Póvoa do Varzim
15:00	Zé Diogo 20'; Tiago Lopes 54'; Nani 65'; Nelsinho 8' (pen.), 60'		Sobrinho 31' (pen.)	Referee: José Laranjeiro

9 September 2012	União de Leiria (II)	2–1	Marinhas (III)	Campo da Portela, Santa Catarina da Serra
15:00	Serginho 12'; Fellipe Silva 41'		Paulo Campos 65'	Referee: André Gralha

9 September 2012	Torres Novas (III)	1–2	Ribeira Brava (II)	Estádio Municipal Dr. Alves Vieira, Torres Novas
16:00	Major 30'		Anderson 45' (pen.); Abel Vieira 62'	Referee: Carlos Espadinha

== Second round ==
The 50 winners from the first round joined the 30 teams awarded with a second round bye and the 16 teams competing in the Segunda Liga (SL), the second tier league. The draw took place on 31 August 2012 and matches were played mainly on 16 September 2012, with a few games taking place the day before.

Number of teams per league in competition before this round
Primeira Liga	Segunda Liga	Second Division	Third Division	Total
16 / 16	16 / 16	38 / 48	42 / 82	112 / 162

Third Division teams Aliados de Lordelo, Caldas, Lourinhanense, Oliveira do Hospital and Santa Eulália were the only teams to eliminate opponents from better ranked leagues. Lourinhanense defeated a Second Division team for the second consecutive time.

15 September 2012	União da Madeira (SL)	3–1	Benfica Castelo Branco (II)	Estádio Municipal de Machico, Machico, Madeira
15:00	Rúben Andrade 2'; Ricardo Chíxaro 63'; Silva 89'		Ronan 89'	Referee: Hugo Miguel

15 September 2012	Barreiro (III)	2–3	União de Lamas (III)	Campo do Sport Clube Barreiro, Angra do Heroísmo, Azores
15:00	Marco André 8'; Lhuka 79'		Xavi 2', 42'; Castro 45+1'	Referee: Ricardo Oliveira

15 September 2012	Avanca (III)	0–3	Sporting de Espinho (II)	Parque Desportivo da Associação Atlética de Avanca, Avanca
15:00			Jónatas 46'; Fábio Vieira 66'; Caetano 90+2'	Referee: Rui Patrício

15 September 2012	Atlético CP (SL)	0–2	Naval (SL)	Estádio da Tapadinha, Lisbon
15:00			Paulo Regula 27', 30'	Referee: Paulo Baptista

15 September 2012	Feirense (SL)	2–0	Padroense (II)	Estádio Marcolino de Castro, Santa Maria da Feira
16:00			Pires 15'; Jorge Gonçalves 15'	Referee: Renato Gonçalves

15 September 2012	Lagoa (III)	0–5	Tondela (SL)	Campo Capitão Josino da Costa, Lagoa
16:00			Jô 9'; Diogo Fonseca 29', 59', 90+2'; Backar Baldé 85'	Referee: Bruno Esteves

15 September 2012	Varzim (II)	3–0	Bustelo (II)	Estádio do Varzim, Póvoa de Varzim
17:00			Nelsinho 16' (pen.); Nelson Campos 80', 88'	Referee: Paulo Brás

16 September 2012	Operário (II)	0–3 (Note: Operário won the match 3–1 but were eventually excluded from the competition because they fielded irregularly their goalkeeper. This situation was protested by Caldas and the FPF board of justice ruled in their favour, imposing Operário with a 3–0 administrative defeat.)	Caldas (III)	Campo João Gualberto Borges Arruda, Lagoa, Azores
11:00				Referee: Rui Amaral

16 September 2012	Aliados de Lordelo (III)	2–1 (a.e.t.)	Sertanense (II)	Estádio Cidade de Lordelo, Lordelo (Paredes)
15:00	Bezu 90' (pen.), 121'		Janu 1'	Referee: Leonardo Marques

16 September 2012	Fátima (II)	4–1	Sporting de Pombal (III)	Estádio Municipal de Fátima, Fátima
15:00	João Fonseca 7'; Diogo Alves 22'; Luís Sousa 86'; Pedro Caipiro 90+1'		Miguel Xavier 52'	Referee: Hugo Serafim Silva

16 September 2012	Atlético de Reguengos (III)	1–0	Grijó (III)	Campo Virgilio Durão, Reguengos de Monsaraz
15:00	Jorge Balixa 33'			Referee: Nuno Campos

16 September 2012	Pedras Rubras (III)	4–0	Marítimo da Graciosa (III)	Estádio Municipal de Pedras Rubras, Pedras Rubras
15:00	Carlitos Almeida 9'; João Paulo 15'; Fábio Fonseca 39'; Kisley 48'			Referee: Arnaldo Araújo

16 September 2012	Monção (III)	0–1 (a.e.t.)	Eléctrico (III)	Estádio Manuel Lima, Monção
15:00			Yoruba 118'	Referee: António Resende

16 September 2012	Santa Maria (III)	1–1 (a.e.t.) (4–5 p)	Pinhalnovense (II)	Estádio da Devesa, Barcelos
15:00	Paulinho Lopes 25'		Aylton Boa Morte 82'	Referee: João Santos

16 September 2012	Mirandela (II)	1–0	Cartaxo (III)	Estádio São Sebastião, Mirandela
15:00	Leandro 45'			Referee: Sílvio Gouveia

16 September 2012	Lourinhanense (III)	2–1 (a.e.t.)	Louletano (II)	Estádio Municipal da Lourinhã, Lourinhã
15:00	Pedro Fonseca 22', 120' (pen.)		Chiquinho 90'	Referee: Hélder Malheiro

16 September 2012	Vila Meã (III)	2–3	Aguiar da Beira (III)	Estádio Municipal de Vila Meã, Vila Meã (Amarante)
15:00	Mirandinha 38'; André 45'		Vitor Pinto 6'; Marco Aurélio 59'; Renan 63'	Referee: João Henriques

16 September 2012	Freamunde (SL)	1–0	Salgueiros 08 (III)	Complexo Desportivo do Sport Clube Freamunde, Freamunde
15:00	Pedro 83'			Referee: Hugo Pacheco

16 September 2012	Sourense (III)	0–0 (a.e.t.) (10–11 p)	Pampilhosa (II)	Campo Dr. António Coelho Rodrigues, Soure
15:00	Pedro 83'			Referee: José Laranjeira

16 September 2012	Futebol Benfica (II)	1–2	Fafe (II)	Estádio Francisco Lázaro, Lisbon
15:00	Frutuoso 88' (pen.)		Traquina 30'; Ricardo Valente 79'	Referee: Fábio Veríssimo

16 September 2012	Chaves (II)	0–2	Tirsense (II)	Estádio Municipal Eng. Manuel Branco Teixeira, Chaves
15:00			Pedro Tiba 41'; Filipe Babo 51'	Referee: Sérgio Soares

16 September 2012	Pêro Pinheiro (III)	0–1	1º de Dezembro (II)	Parque de Jogos Pardal Monteiro, Sintra
15:00			Luisinho 90+3'	Referee: João Pinto

16 September 2012	Vilaverdense (II)	2–1	Felgueiras 1932 (III)	Campo Cruz do Reguengo, Vila Verde
15:00	João Ribeiro 40'; Beré 90+2'		Fábio Freitas 5'	Referee: Carlos Dias

16 September 2012	Alcanenense (III)	0–1	Oliveirense (III)	Estádio Joaquim Maria Batista, Alcanena
15:00			João Cruz 17'	Referee: José Gomes

16 September 2012	Fabril Barreiro (III)	2–1 (a.e.t.)	Paredes (III)	Estádio Alfredo da Silva, Barreiro
15:00	Rúben Guerreiro 7'; Rui Martinho 112'		Nogueira 35'	Referee: Jorge Maia

16 September 2012	Amarante (II)	0–3	Santa Eulália (III)	Estádio Dr. Machado de Matos, Felgueiras
15:00	Nelson 44'; Zézé 46'; Benicio 86'			Referee: Daniel Cardoso

16 September 2012	Quarteirense (II)	2–3	Farense (II)	Estádio Municipal de Quarteira, Quarteira
15:00	Matthew 28'; Diamantino Conceição 37'		Fábio Marques 33'; Fajardo 55' (pen.); Diop 68'	Referee: José Almeida

16 September 2012	Melgacense (III)	1–1 (a.e.t.) (2–3 p)	Ponte da Barca (III)	Centro de Estágios de Melgaço, Melgaço
15:00	Luis Coentrão 45'		Peixoto 22'	Referee: Joaquim Gayo

16 September 2012	União de Leiria (II)	1–0	Ribeira Brava (II)	Campo da Portela, Santa Catarina da Serra (Leiria)
15:00	Sérgio 46'			Referee: João Mendes

16 September 2012	Tocha (II)	1–2	Nogueirense (II)	Complexo Desportivo da Tocha, Tocha (Cantanhede)
15:00	Fernando 66'		Chano 3'; Xano 41'	Referee: José Rodrigues

16 September 2012	Sousense (II)	0–2	Coimbrões (II)	Estádio 1º de Dezembro, Gondomar
15:00			Nuno Pinto 10'; Nando 80'	Referee: Filipe Reis

16 September 2012	Belenenses (SL)	4–0	Vizela (II)	Estádio do Restelo, Lisbon
15:00	Mamadou Diawara (?); João Meira 30'; Fredy 70'			Referee: Duarte Gomes

16 September 2012	Leixões (SL)	4–1	Leça (III)	Estádio do Mar, Matosinhos
15:00	Pedras 8' (pen.), 55'; Kizito 48'; José Pedro 80'		Diogo Pedras 76'	Referee: Vasco Santos

16 September 2012	Oliveirense (SL)	5–1	Sintrense (III)	Estádio Carlos Osório, Oliveira de Azeméis
15:00	Hélder Silva 82'; Carlitos 90+2', 115'; Diego 103'; Avto 108'		Milton 60'	Referee: Manuel Oliveira

16 September 2012	Penalva do Castelo (III)	1–0	Peniche (III)	Parque Desportivo de Sant´Ana, Penalva do Castelo
15:00	Joe Júnior 69'			Referee: João Roque

16 September 2012	Sampedrense (III)	0–1	Sacavenense (III)	Estádio Municipal da Pedreira, São Pedro do Sul
15:00			Soca 80'	Referee: Ângelo Correia

16 September 2012	Oeiras (II)	1–4 (a.e.t.)	Oliveira do Hospital (III)	Estádio Municipal de Oeiras, Oeiras
15:00	Fábio 48'		Carlos Almeida 62'; Ivan 97'	Referee: Rui Rodrigues

16 September 2012	Ribeirão (II)	6–0	União de Montemor (III)	Estádio do Passal, Vila Nova de Famalicão
15:00	Tiago Silva 5', 56', 75'; Ansumane 36'; Roger 70'; Hugo Cruz 76'			Referee: Pedro Campos

16 September 2012	Sporting da Covilhã (SL)	4–0	Cinfães (II)	Complexo Desportivo da Covilhã, Covilhã
15:00	Joel 3' (o.g.); Fabricio 21' (pen.); Edgar 55'; Moreira 88'			Referee: Luís Ferreira

16 September 2012	Vitória do Pico (III)	0–3	Anadia (II)	Campo do Vitória Futebol Clube, São Roque do Pico, Azores
15:00	Moacir 52', 69'; Marito 58'			Referee: Tiago Martins

16 September 2012	Desportivo das Aves (SL)	2–0	Estarreja (III)	Estádio do Clube Desportivo das Aves, Vila das Aves
15:00	Djibril Sarr 88'; André 90+3' (o.g.)			Referee: Manuel Mota

16 September 2012	Tourizense (II)	1–1 (a.e.t.) (4–1 p)	Oriental (II)	Estádio Visconde do Vinhal, Tábua
15:00				Referee: Pedro Maia

16 September 2012	Limianos (II)	4–0	Amora (III)	Campo do Cruzeiro, Ponte de Lima
15:00	Diego 20', 51'; Tanela 5', 35'			Referee: Pedro Vilaça

16 September 2012	Vasco da Gama (III)	0–3	Santa Clara (SL)	Estádio Municipal de Vidigueira, Vidigueira
15:00			Monteiro 8'; Porcellis 30', 90+2'	Referee: João Ferreira

16 September 2012	Praiense (III)	0–1	Gondomar (II)	Estádio Municipal da Praia da Vitória, Praia da Vitória, Azores
16:00			Júlio César 82'	Referee: António Costa

16 September 2012	Académico de Viseu (II)	0–2	Portimonense (SL)	Estádio do Fontelo, Viseu
16:00			Simmy 32'; Márcio Madeira 45'	Referee: Artur Soares Dias

16 September 2012	Casa Pia (II)	0–1	Penafiel (SL)	Estádio Pina Manique, Lisbon
16:00			Robson 40'	Referee: Nuno Almeida

14 October 2012	Arouca (SL)	1–0	Trofense (SL)	Estádio Municipal de Arouca, Arouca
15:00	Clemente 33'			Referee: Cosme Machado

== Third round ==
The 16 teams competing in the top tier Primeira Liga enter the tournament at this stage, where they are joined by the 48 winners of the previous round. The draw for this round took place on 25 September 2012, and matches were played mostly during the weekend of 20–21 October 2012. The matches involving Benfica and Braga were played respectively on the 18 and 19 October, due to broadcasting purposes, whereas the match between Caldas and Coimbrões was postponed to 2 December 2012, due to logistical difficulties by the latter club.

Number of teams per league in competition before this round
Primeira Liga	Segunda Liga	Second Division	Third Division	Total
16 / 16	14 / 16	19 / 48	15 / 82	64 / 162

Estoril and Sporting CP were the only Primeira Liga teams to fall in this round, both against teams from the same league. For the third and second consecutive round, respectively, Lourinhanense (III) and Oliveira do Hospital (III) reassured their maintenance in the competition at the expense of opponents from a higher league. Similar achievements were made by Pampilhosa (II), Pedras Rubras (III) and Penalva do Castelo (III).

18 October 2012	Freamunde (SL)	0–4	Benfica (PL)	Complexo Desportivo do Sport Clube Freamunde, Freamunde
20:15			Lima 16'; Cardozo 45'; Salvio 62'; Gomes 74'	Referee: Manuel Mota

19 October 2012	Braga (PL)	3–0 (a.e.t.)	Leixões (SL)	Estádio AXA, Braga
20:15	Viana 98'; Rúben Micael 103'; Éder 115'			Referee: Jorge Sousa

20 October 2012	Santa Eulália (III)	0–1	Porto (PL)	Campo Municipal de Santa Eulália, Vizela
14:30			Danilo 31'	Referee: Rui Costa

20 October 2012	Gondomar (II)	0–2 (a.e.t.)	Gil Vicente (PL)	Estádio de S. Miguel, Gondomar
15:00			Ramazotti 104'; Luís Carlos 112'	Referee: Carlos Xistra

20 October 2012	Naval (SL)	1–3 (a.e.t.)	Arouca (SL)	Estádio Municipal José Bento Pessoa, Figueira da Foz
16:00	João Pedro 9'		Paulo Clemente 87'; Joeano 98'; Monteiro 117'	Referee: Paulo Baptista

20 October 2012	Olhanense (PL)	3–0	1º de Dezembro (II)	Estádio do Algarve, Faro
16:00	Duarte 45'; Jander 64'; Yontcha 76'			Referee: João Capela

20 October 2012	Beira-Mar (PL)	0–0 (a.e.t.) (4–2 p)	Penafiel (SL)	Estádio Municipal de Aveiro, Aveiro
16:00				Referee: Olegário Benquerença

20 October 2012	Vitória de Setúbal (PL)	1–0	Tondela (SL)	Estádio do Bonfim, Setúbal
17:00	Meyong 78'			Referee: Pedro Proença

21 October 2012	Ponte da Barca (III)	1–3	Académica de Coimbra (PL)	Estádio Municipal Ponte da Barca, Ponte da Barca
14:00	Arnaud 40'		Cleyton 17'; Ogu 32'; Cissé 78'	Referee: Artur Soares Dias

21 October 2012	Oliveira do Hospital (III)	1–1 (a.e.t.) (4–2 p)	Ribeirão (II)	Estádio Municipal de Oliveira do Hospital, Oliveira do Hospital
14:00	Amadu Turé 68'		Paulo Rola 62'	Referee: Paulo Brás

21 October 2012	Limianos (II)	0–1	Tourizense (II)	Campo do Cruzeiro, Ponte de Lima
14:00			Paulo Roberto 90+2'	Referee: Paulo Rodrigues

21 October 2012	Pampilhosa (II)	5–5 (a.e.t.) (4–2 p)	Sporting da Covilhã (SL)	Estádio Germano Godinho, Pampilhosa (Mealhada)
14:00	Sarmento 5'; Bebé 57' (pen.), 102' (pen.); Paulo Ribeiro 105', 120'		Moreira 72', 93'; Tarcísio 94' (pen.); Wilson 113' (o.g.); João Rodrigues 117'	Referee: Hugo Miguel

21 October 2012	Fabril Barreiro (III)	3–1	Eléctrico (III)	Estádio Alfredo da Silva, Barreiro
14:00	Rui Correia 66' (pen.); Fábio Marinheiro 79'; Miguel Pimenta 81'		Billy 59'	Referee: José Gomes

21 October 2012	Pinhalnovense (II)	0–3	Lourinhanense (III)	Campo de Jogos Santos Jorge, Pinhal Novo
14:00			Paulinho 45'; Fábio Portela 62'; Marinho 81'

21 October 2012	Aguiar da Beira (III)	1–0 (a.e.t.)	União de Lamas (III)	Estádio Municipal de Aguiar da Beira, Aguiar da Beira
15:00	Tiago Gomes 104'

21 October 2012	Atlético de Reguengos (III)	0–1	Farense (II)	Campo Virgilio Durão, Reguengos de Monsaraz
15:00			Bruno Bernardo 54'

21 October 2012	Vitória de Guimarães (PL)	6–1	Vilaverdense (II)	Estádio D. Afonso Henriques, Guimarães
15:00	Toscano 2', 18'; Ricardo 22', 23'; Soudani 25', 49'		Beré 55'	Referee: Manuel Oliveira

21 October 2012	Desportivo das Aves (SL)	3–1 (a.e.t.)	Tirsense (II)	Estádio do Desportivo das Aves, Vila das Aves
15:00	Santos 9'; Reis 114'; Rabiola 119'		Tiba 90'	Referee: Renato Gonçalves

21 October 2012	Sacavenense (III)	2–2 (a.e.t.) (2–3 p)	União de Leiria (II)	Campo do Sacavenense, Sacavém
15:00	Leandro 22'; Fábio Zacarias 70'		Fufuco 52'; Martins 61'

21 October 2012	Fátima (II)	0–0 (a.e.t.) (3–4 p)	Penalva do Castelo (III)	Estádio Municipal de Fátima, Fátima
15:00				Referee: André Gralha

21 October 2012	Varzim (II)	1–1 (a.e.t.) (2–3 p)	Mirandela (II)	Estádio do Varzim, Póvoa de Varzim
15:00	Pato 74'		Rondinele 49'	Referee: Jorge Faustino

21 October 2012	Nacional (PL)	4–0	Mirandela (II)	Estádio da Madeira, Funchal, Madeira
15:00	Rondón 29'; Claudemir 47'; Mateus 50'; Keita 86'			Referee: Bruno Esteves

21 October 2012	Nogueirense (II)	1–3	Santa Clara (SL)	Estádio Santo António, Oliveira do Hospital
15:00	Daniel Gonçalves 8'		Reguilha 15'; Porcellis 76'; Minhoca 83'	Referee: Vasco Santos

21 October 2012	Anadia (II)	2–5 (a.e.t.)	Belenenses (SL)	Estádio Municipal Eng. Sílvio Henriques Cerveira, Anadia
15:00	Moacir 66'; Marito 83'		Kay 9'; Silva 33' (pen.); Alves 105'; Caeiro 112'; Fredy 118'	Referee: Luís Ferreira

21 October 2012	Pedras Rubras (III)	3–2 (a.e.t.)	União da Madeira (SL)	Estádio Municipal de Pedras Rubras, Pedras Rubras
15:00	Kisley 84'; André Oliveira 90+2'; Alex 114'		Bruno 72' (pen.); Fernandes 77'

21 October 2012	Feirense (SL)	3–0	Fafe (II)	Estádio Marcolino de Castro, Santa Maria da Feira
15:00	Marcelo Goiano 3'; Cunha 58'; Fonseca 68'

21 October 2012	Aliados de Lordelo (III)	0–2	Oliveirense (SL)	Estádio Cidade de Lordelo, Lordelo (Paredes)
16:00			Laranjeira 5'; Barry 88'	Referee: Jorge Ferreira

21 October 2012	Marítimo (PL)	2–1 (a.e.t.)	Oliveirense (III)	Estádio dos Barreiros, Funchal, Madeira
16:00	Rodrigo António 22'; Olim 102'		Correia 79'	Referee: Jorge Tavares

21 October 2012	Rio Ave (PL)	2–1	Portimonense (SL)	Estádio dos Arcos, Vila do Conde
16:00	Tomás 7', 77'		Fernandes 66'

21 October 2012	Estoril (PL)	1–2	Paços de Ferreira (PL)	Estádio António Coimbra da Mota, Estoril
16:00	Nascimento 18'		Manuel José 43'; Vítor 85'	Referee: Duarte Gomes

21 October 2012	Moreirense (PL)	3–2 (a.e.t.)	Sporting CP (PL)	Parque de Jogos Comendador Joaquim de Almeida Freitas, Moreira de Cónegos
20:15	Olivera 46', 62'; Wágner 97'		Rinaudo 7'; Van Wolfswinkel 79'

2 December 2012	Caldas (III)	0–0 (a.e.t.) (2–4 p)	Coimbrões (II)	Campo da Mata, Caldas da Rainha
15:00				Referee: João Mendes

== Fourth round ==
The draw for the fourth round took place on 29 October 2012, and matches were played mostly on 18 November 2012, with a few being held earlier on 16 and 17 November. The match between Desportivo das Aves and Coimbrões was played later, on 12 December, because of the delays resulting from the FPF evaluation of irregularities that occurred in the second round fixture between Operário (II) and Caldas (III).

Number of teams per league in competition before this round
Primeira Liga	Segunda Liga	Second Division	Third Division	Total
14 / 16	6 / 16	6 / 48	6 / 82	32 / 162

In this round, three teams eliminated opponents from upper tier leagues: Arouca (SL), Tourizense (II), which advanced to fifth round as the last remaining Second Division team in competition; and giant-killers Lourinhanense (III), who have consecutively beaten teams from stronger leagues since the first round.

16 November 2012	Pampilhosa (II)	1–3	Braga (PL)	Estádio Municipal Dr. Américo Couto, Mealhada
16:46	Leitão 38'		Viana 12'; Alan 20' (pen.); Zé Luís 90+1'	Referee: Vasco Santos

16 November 2012	Moreirense (PL)	0–2	Benfica (PL)	Parque de Jogos Comendador Joaquim de Almeida Freitas, Moreira de Cónegos
21:00			Matić 59'; Cardozo 90+2'	Referee: Duarte Gomes

17 November 2012	Aguiar da Beira (III)	0–3	Marítimo (PL)	Estádio Municipal de Aguiar da Beira, Aguiar da Beira
15:00			Rossi 9'; Olim 80'; Adilson 90'	Referee: Artur Soares Dias

17 November 2012	Farense (II)	1–1 (a.e.t.) (4–5 p)	Beira-Mar (PL)	Estádio de São Luís, Faro
17:00	Lourenço 34'		Nildo Petrolina 20'	Referee: Marco Ferreira

17 November 2012	Nacional (PL)	0–3	Porto (PL)	Estádio da Madeira, Funchal, Madeira
20:15			González 27'; Mangala 71'; Kléber 89'	Referee: Paulo Baptista

18 November 2012	Mirandela (II)	1–2 (a.e.t.)	Gil Vicente (PL)	Estádio São Sebastião, Mirandela
14:00	Inzaghi 90'		Pecks 65'; Cláudio 118' (pen.)	Referee: Jorge Tavares

18 November 2012	Oliveira do Hospital (III)	0–2	Fabril Barreiro (III)	Estádio Municipal de Oliveira do Hospital, Oliveira do Hospital
14:00			Correia 26'; Rúben Guerreiro 54'	Referee: Arnaldo Araújo

18 November 2012	Tourizense (II)	1–0 (a.e.t.)	Santa Clara (SL)	Estádio Visconde do Vinhal, Tábua
14:00	Paná 94'			Referee: Rui Silva

18 November 2012	Arouca (SL)	2–1 (a.e.t.)	Rio Ave (PL)	Estádio Municipal de Arouca, Arouca
14:00	Paulo Clemente 28'; Kovačević 98'		Tomás 85'	Referee: Hugo Pacheco

18 November 2012	Oliveirense (SL)	1–0	União de Leiria (II)	Estádio Carlos Osório, Oliveira de Azeméis
14:00	Santos 44'			Referee: Jorge Sousa

18 November 2012	Lourinhanense (III)	3–2	Feirense (SL)	Estádio Municipal da Lourinhã, Lourinhã
14:00	Pedro Fonseca 59' (pen.); Ricardinho 70', 75'		Platiny 7'; Silva 26'	Referee: Nuno Almeida

18 November 2012	Paços de Ferreira (PL)	2–1	Olhanense (PL)	Estádio da Mata Real, Paços de Ferreira
15:00	Cícero 79', 80'		Abdi 13'

18 November 2012	Belenenses (SL)	3–0	Pedras Rubras (III)	Estádio do Restelo, Lisbon
15:00	Rambé 70', 72'; Zambujo 90'			Referee: Carlos Xistra

18 November 2012	Académica de Coimbra (PL)	1–0 (a.e.t.)	Penalva do Castelo (III)	Estádio Cidade de Coimbra, Coimbra
16:00	Edinho 108' (pen.)			Referee: João Ferreira

18 November 2012	Vitória de Setúbal (PL)	2–2 (a.e.t.) (3–5 p)	Vitória de Guimarães (PL)	Estádio do Bonfim, Setúbal
20:15	Meyong 13' (pen.); Jorginho 115'		Ribeiro 50' (pen.); Freire 114'

12 December 2012	Desportivo das Aves (SL)	2–1	Coimbrões (II)	Estádio do Clube Desportivo das Aves, Vila das Aves
20:00	Ivo 12' (o.g.); Dally Cyrille 85'		Joel 14'	Referee: Ricardo Gonçalves

== Fifth round ==
The draw for the fifth round took place on the 20 November 2012, and matches were to be played between 30 November and 2 December 2012. The match opposing Benfica (PL) and Desportivo das Aves (SL) was due to be played on 1 December but was rescheduled to 2 January 2013.

Number of teams per league in competition before this round
Primeira Liga	Segunda Liga	Second Division	Third Division	Total
9 / 16	4 / 16	1 / 48	2 / 82	16 / 162

Primeira Liga champions Porto were defeated by league opponents Braga, becoming the second "Big Three" club to be eliminated, after Sporting CP in the third round. None of the last remaining teams from the Second and Third Division survived this round: Tourizense (II) was defeated by title-holders Académica de Coimbra, while Fabril Barreiro (III) lost to Belenenses (SL) and underdogs Lourinhanense (III) were finally halted at home by Paços de Ferreira (PL).

30 November 2012	Braga (PL)	2–1	Porto (PL)	Estádio Municipal de Braga, Braga
20:15	Danilo 75' (o.g.); Eder 80'		Mangala 13'	Attendance: 9,070; Referee: Olegário Benquerença

1 December 2012	Académica de Coimbra (PL)	3–0	Tourizense (II)	Estádio Cidade de Coimbra, Coimbra
17:00	Edinho 37'; Eduardo 80' (pen.); Nivaldo 90+4'			Attendance: 1,239; Referee: Rui Costa

2 December 2012	Arouca (SL)	2–1	Beira-Mar (PL)	Estádio Municipal de Arouca, Arouca
14:00	Bijou 10'; Paulo Clemente 21'		Serginho 22'	Attendance: 1,300; Referee: Rui Silva

2 December 2012	Lourinhanense (III)	0–6	Paços de Ferreira (PL)	Estádio Municipal da Lourinhã, Lourinhã
14:00			Vítor 8' (pen.), 25'; Josué 24'; Álvarez 53'; Cícero 58'; Angulo 65'	Attendance: 3,000; Referee: Jorge Ferreira

2 December 2012	Belenenses (SL)	4–0	Fabril Barreiro (III)	Estádio do Restelo, Lisbon
15:00	Rambé 50', 73'; Paulo Roberto 77'; Arsénio 83'			Attendance: 800; Referee: Hugo Miguel

2 December 2012	Gil Vicente (PL)	1–0	Oliveirense (SL)	Estádio Cidade de Barcelos, Barcelos
15:00	Yero 30'			Attendance: 1,000; Referee: Pedro Proença

2 December 2012	Marítimo (PL)	1–1 (a.e.t.) (4–5 p)	Vitória de Guimarães (PL)	Estádio dos Barreiros, Funchal, Madeira
19:15	Fidélis 9'		Ricardo 64'	Attendance: 2,500; Referee: Bruno Paixão
	Penalties
	Rosário (penalty scored); Simão (penalty scored); Rodrigo António (penalty scored); Fidélis (penalty missed); Miranda (penalty missed); Adilson (penalty scored); João Diogo (penalty missed)		(penalty missed) Ribeiro; (penalty scored) Toscano; (penalty scored) Olímpio; (penalty scored) André; (penalty missed) Lalkovič; (penalty scored) Addy; (penalty scored) Baldé

2 January 2013	Benfica (PL)	6–0	Desportivo das Aves (SL)	Estádio da Luz, Lisbon
20:15	Rodrigo 5', 57'; Cardozo 18', 22', 32'; Lima 73' (pen.)			Attendance: 15,713; Referee: Hugo Miguel

== Quarterfinals ==
The draw for the quarterfinals – which also determined the pairings for the semifinals – took place on 18 December 2012, and the matches were played on 16–17 January 2013.

Number of teams per league in competition before this round
Primeira Liga	Segunda Liga	Second Division	Third Division	Total
6 / 16	2 / 16	0 / 48	0 / 82	8 / 162

Belenenses defeated Arouca in the match between the last surviving Segunda Liga teams, whereas Benfica ended the reign of defending champions Académica de Coimbra with a crushing 4–0 away win.

16 January 2013	Paços de Ferreira (PL)	2–1	Gil Vicente (PL)	Estádio da Mata Real, Paços de Ferreira
18:45	Yero 18' (o.g.); Caetano 90+3'		Vilela 72'	Attendance: 500; Referee: Carlos Xistra

16 January 2013	Vitória de Guimarães (PL)	2–1 (a.e.t.)	Braga (PL)	Estádio D. Afonso Henriques, Guimarães
20:45	Barrientos 1', 93'		Eder 85'	Attendance: 7,870; Referee: João Capela

17 January 2013	Arouca (SL)	1–4	Belenenses (SL)	Estádio Municipal de Arouca, Arouca
18:45	André Claro 7'		Silva 56'; Diakité 65'; Kay 77'; Ferreira 90+1'	Referee: Artur Soares Dias

17 January 2013	Académica de Coimbra (PL)	0–4	Benfica (PL)	Estádio Cidade de Coimbra, Coimbra
20:45			John 5'; Lima 9', 27'; Salvio 71'	Referee: Jorge Sousa

== Semifinals ==
The semifinal pairings were previously determined during the draw for the quarterfinals, held on 18 December 2012. This round is contested over two legs, with the first leg taking place on 30 January 2013 and the second leg on 17 April 2013.

Number of teams per league in competition before this round
Primeira Liga	Segunda Liga	Second Division	Third Division	Total
3 / 16	1 / 16	0 / 48	0 / 82	4 / 162

=== First leg ===
30 January 2013	Paços de Ferreira (PL)	0–2	Benfica (PL)	Estádio da Mata Real, Paços de Ferreira
20:00			Lima 58'; John 75'	Attendance: 4,500; Referee: Cosme Machado

27 March 2013	Belenenses (SL)	0–2	Vitória de Guimarães (PL)	Estádio do Restelo, Lisbon
20:00			Ricardo 29', 76'	Attendance: 27,909; Referee: Hugo Pacheco

=== Second leg ===
15 April 2013	Benfica (PL)	1–1 (3–1 agg.)	Paços de Ferreira (PL)	Estádio da Luz, Lisbon
20:00	Cardozo 53'		Cícero 79'	Attendance: 17,118; Referee: Bruno Esteves

17 April 2013	Vitória de Guimarães (PL)	1–0 (3–0 agg.)	Belenenses (SL)	Estádio D. Afonso Henriques, Guimarães
20:00	Matias 14'			Referee: Carlos Xistra

== Final ==
26 May 2013
17:15 WEST

Benfica	1–2	Vitória de Guimarães
Gaitán 30'	Report	Soudani 80'; Pereira 82'

Estádio Nacional, Oeiras
Attendance: 36,850
Referee: Jorge Sousa

== Top goalscorers ==
Rank	Player	Team	Goals	Games
1	(Paraguay) Óscar Cardozo	Benfica	6	6
1	(Portugal) Ricardo	Vitória de Guimarães	6	6
3	(Brazil) Lima	Benfica	5	7
4	(Cape Verde) Rambé	Belenenses	4	2
5	(Brazil) Beré	Vilaverdense	4	3
5	(Portugal) Tiba	Tirsense	4	3
7	(Portugal) Paulo Clemente	Arouca	4	5
7	(Portugal) Pedro Fonseca	Lourinhanense	4	5

Last update: 26 May 2013
