= 2012–13 C.F. Os Belenenses season =

Belenenses
2012–13 season
- President: António Soares
- Manager: Mitchell van der Gaag
- Stadium: Estádio do Restelo
- Segunda Liga: 1st (promoted)
- Taça de Portugal: Semi-finals
- Taça da Liga: First round
- Top goalscorer: League: Tiago Caeiro (13); All: Tiago Caeiro (14)

The 2012–13 Belenenses season was the club's 95th competitive season, 5th in the Segunda Liga, and 95th year in existence as a football club.

Along with the club's participation in the Segunda Liga, the club also competed in the Taça de Portugal and Taça da Liga. On 30 March 2013, Belenenses won promotion back to the Primeira Liga, following a defeat over Penafiel. Belenenses' campaign was also most notable for several records, namely, most points accumulated during a single season (94).

== Club ==
=== Coaching staff ===
Position	Staff
Manager	(Netherlands) Mitchell van der Gaag
Assistant manager	(Portugal) Jorge Simão
Technical director	(Portugal) Rui Gregório
Goalkeeper Coach	(Portugal) Luís Ferreira
Fitness Coach	(Portugal) José Manuel Almeida
Scout	(Portugal) João Janeiro
Scout	(Portugal) Rui Correia
Director of scouting	(Portugal) Gonçalo Monteiro

=== Other information ===
Chairman	(Portugal) António Soares
Chairman of the SAD	(Portugal) António Soares (Portugal) Rui Pedro Soares
Ground (capacity and dimensions)	Estádio do Restelo (19,856 / 110 x 70 metres)
Training Ground	Estádio do Restelo

== First-team squad ==
Stats as of the end of the 2012–13 season. Games played and goals scored only refers to appearances and goals in domestic league campaigns.

No.	Name	Nationality	Position(s)	Since	Date of birth (age)	Signed from	Games	Goals
Goalkeepers
1	Matt Jones	(England)	GK	2012	11 May 1986 (aged 27)	(Portugal) União da Madeira	41	0
12	Ricardo Fernandes	(Portugal)	GK	2013	28 October 1994 (aged 18)	(Portugal) Youth System	0	0
76	Rafael Veloso	(Portugal)	GK	2012	3 November 1993 (aged 19)	(Portugal) Sporting CP	1	0
77	Filipe Mendes	(Portugal)	GK	2012	17 June 1985 (aged 27)	(Portugal) Lousada	1	0
Defenders
2	André Teixeira	(Portugal)	RB	2012	14 August 1993 (aged 19)	(Portugal) Porto	4	0
3	Kay	(Cape Verde)	CB	2012	5 January 1988 (aged 25)	(Portugal) Operário	35	5
4	Duarte Machado	(Portugal)	LB / RB	2010	12 February 1983 (aged 30)	(Portugal) Fátima	74	0
6	João Meira	(Portugal)	CB / DM	2012	30 April 1987 (aged 26)	(Portugal) Atlético CP	34	2
13	João Afonso	(Portugal)	CB	2012	11 February 1982 (aged 31)	(Portugal) Mafra	16	2
20	Filipe Ferreira	(Portugal)	LB / LM	2012	27 September 1990 (aged 22)	(Portugal) Atlético CP	14	0
21	Nélson Lenho	(Portugal)	LB	2012	22 March 1984 (aged 29)	(Portugal) Santa Clara	35	0
24	Eridson	(Guinea-Bissau)	CB	2012	25 June 1990 (aged 22)	(Portugal) Portimonense	4	0
55	Daniel Martins	(Portugal)	LB	2013	23 June 1993 (aged 19)	(Portugal) Benfica B	1	0
Midfielders
5	Ricardo Alves	(Portugal)	CB / DM	2012	25 March 1993 (aged 20)	(Portugal) Porto	13	1
8	Ruizinho	(Portugal)	CM	2012	13 March 1989 (aged 24)	(Portugal) Operário	7	0
14	Fernando Ferreira	(Portugal)	CM / DM	2011	20 November 1986 (aged 26)	(Portugal) Tondela	63	11
18	Yacine Si Salem	(Algeria)	AM	2012	10 January 1988 (aged 25)	Free agent	21	2
26	Zazá	(Senegal)	CM / RB	2009	9 January 1990 (aged 23)	(Portugal) Youth System	22	3
28	Tiago Silva	(Portugal)	AM	2012	2 June 1993 (aged 19)	(Portugal) Youth System	37	4
80	Mourtala Diakité	(Mali)	CB / DM	2012	10 October 1980 (aged 32)	(China) Guangdong Sunray Cave	35	5
94	Fábio Sturgeon	(Portugal)	AM / RM	2012	4 February 1994 (aged 19)	(Portugal) Youth System	4	0
Forwards
7	Arsénio Nunes	(Portugal)	LW / RW	2012	30 August 1989 (aged 23)	(Portugal) Ribeirão	42	5
9	Tiago Caeiro	(Portugal)	CF	2012	29 March 1984 (aged 29)	(Portugal) Atlético CP	30	13
10	Yves Desmarets	(Haiti)	LM / LW	2012	19 July 1979 (aged 33)	(Greece) Kerkyra	28	8
11	Fredy	(Portugal)	LW / RW	2009	27 March 1990 (aged 23)	(Portugal) Youth System	92	12
17	Jordan Botaka	(Democratic Republic of the Congo)	RW	2012	24 June 1993 (aged 19)	(Belgium) Club Brugge	0	0
19	Rambé	(Cape Verde)	CF	2012	4 October 1989 (aged 23)	(Portugal) Pinhalnovense	15	2
23	Luís Zambujo	(Portugal)	LW / RW	2012	29 September 1986 (aged 26)	(Portugal) Portimonense	9	0
25	Paulo Roberto	(Brazil)	CF	2012	4 July 1985 (aged 27)	(Portugal) Mirandela	15	0
39	Mamadou Diawara	(France)	CF	2012	26 July 1989 (aged 23)	(Cyprus) Akritas Chlorakas	31	5
70	Rodrigo Parreira	(Portugal)	LW	2012	16 March 1993 (aged 20)	(Portugal) Youth System	0	0

== Awards ==
No.	Pos	Name	Award	Month	Ref
1	GK	(England) Matt Jones	LPFP Segunda Liga Goalkeeper of the Year	—	
		(Netherlands) Mitchell van der Gaag	LPFP Segunda Liga Manager of the Year	—	

== Competitions ==
=== Legend ===
Win Draw Loss

=== Overall ===
Competition	Started round	Final position / round	First match	Last match
Segunda Liga		1st	22 August 2012	18 May 2013
Taça de Portugal	2nd round	Semi-finals	16 September 2012	17 April 2013
Taça da Liga	1st round		29 July 2012	5 August 2012

=== Competition record ===
Competition	Record							
Competition	G	W	D	L	GF	GA	GD	Win %
Segunda Liga	42	29	7	6	75	41	+34	69.05
Taça de Portugal	7	5	0	2	20	6	+14	71.43
Taça da Liga	3	1	1	1	2	2	+0	33.33
Total	52	35	8	9	97	49	+48	67.31

=== Taça de Portugal ===
==== Matches ====
16 September 2012 2	Belenenses	4 – 0	Vizela	Estádio do Restelo, Lisbon
15:00 WEST	Diawara 5', 65'; Meira 13'; Fredy 71' (pen.)			Referee: Duarte Gomes

21 October 2012 3	Anadia	2 – 5 (a.e.t.)	Belenenses	Estádio Municipal Engenheiro Sílvio Henriques Cerveira, Anadia
15:00 WEST	Moacir 66'; Marito 83'		Kay 9'; T. Silva 33'; R. Alves 105' (pen.); Caeiro 112'; Fredy 118'	Referee: Luís Ferreira

18 November 2012 4	Belenenses	3 – 0	Pedras Rubras	Estádio do Restelo, Lisbon
15:00 WET	Rambé 70', 72'; Zambujo 90'			Referee: Carlos Xistra

2 December 2012 5	Belenenses	4 – 0	Fabril Barreiro	Estádio do Restelo, Lisbon
15:00 WET	Rambé 50', 73'; Arsénio 77'; Roberto 83'			Attendance: 800; Referee: Hugo Miguel

17 January 2013 QF	Arouca	1 – 4	Belenenses	Estádio Municipal de Arouca, Arouca
18:45 WET	Claro 7'		T. Silva 56'; Diakité 65'; Kay 77'; F. Ferreira 90'	Attendance: 550; Referee: Artur Soares Dias

27 March 2013 SF (1st leg)	Belenenses	0 – 2	Vitória de Guimarães	Estádio do Restelo, Lisbon
20:00 WEST			Ricardo 29', 76'	Attendance: 4,500; Referee: Hugo Pacheco

17 April 2013 SF (2nd leg)	Vitória de Guimarães	1 – 0	Belenenses	Estádio D. Afonso Henriques, Guimarães
20:00 WEST	Matias 13'			Referee: Carlos Xistra

== Statistics ==
=== Appearances ===
No.	Pos.	Name	League		Cup		League Cup		Total		Discipline	
No.	Pos.	Name	Apps	Goals	Apps	Goals	Apps	Goals	Apps	Goals	Yellow card	Red card
1	GK	(England) Matt Jones	41	0	1	0	3	0	45	0	0	0
2	DF	(Portugal) André Teixeira	4	0	0	0	3	0	7	0	1	0
3	DF	(Cape Verde) Kay	35	5	5	2	2	0	42	7	14	0
4	DF	(Portugal) Duarte Machado	38(1)	1	4	0	3	0	45(1)	1	10	0
5	MF	(Portugal) Ricardo Alves	9(4)	1	2(2)	1	0(1)	0	11(7)	2	3	0
6	DF	(Portugal) João Meira	33(1)	2	4	1	0	0	37(1)	3	13	2
7	FW	(Portugal) Arsénio Nunes	27(15)	5	4(3)	1	3	0	34(18)	6	5	0
8	MF	(Portugal) Ruizinho	2(5)	0	0(2)	0	0(3)	0	2(10)	0	2	0
9	FW	(Portugal) Tiago Caeiro	23(7)	13	1(2)	1	0(2)	0	24(11)	14	4	0
10	MF	(Haiti) Yves Desmarets	17(11)	8	4	0	0	0	21(11)	8	3	0
