= Estádio Carlos Osório =

Stadium in Oliveira de Azeméis, Portugal

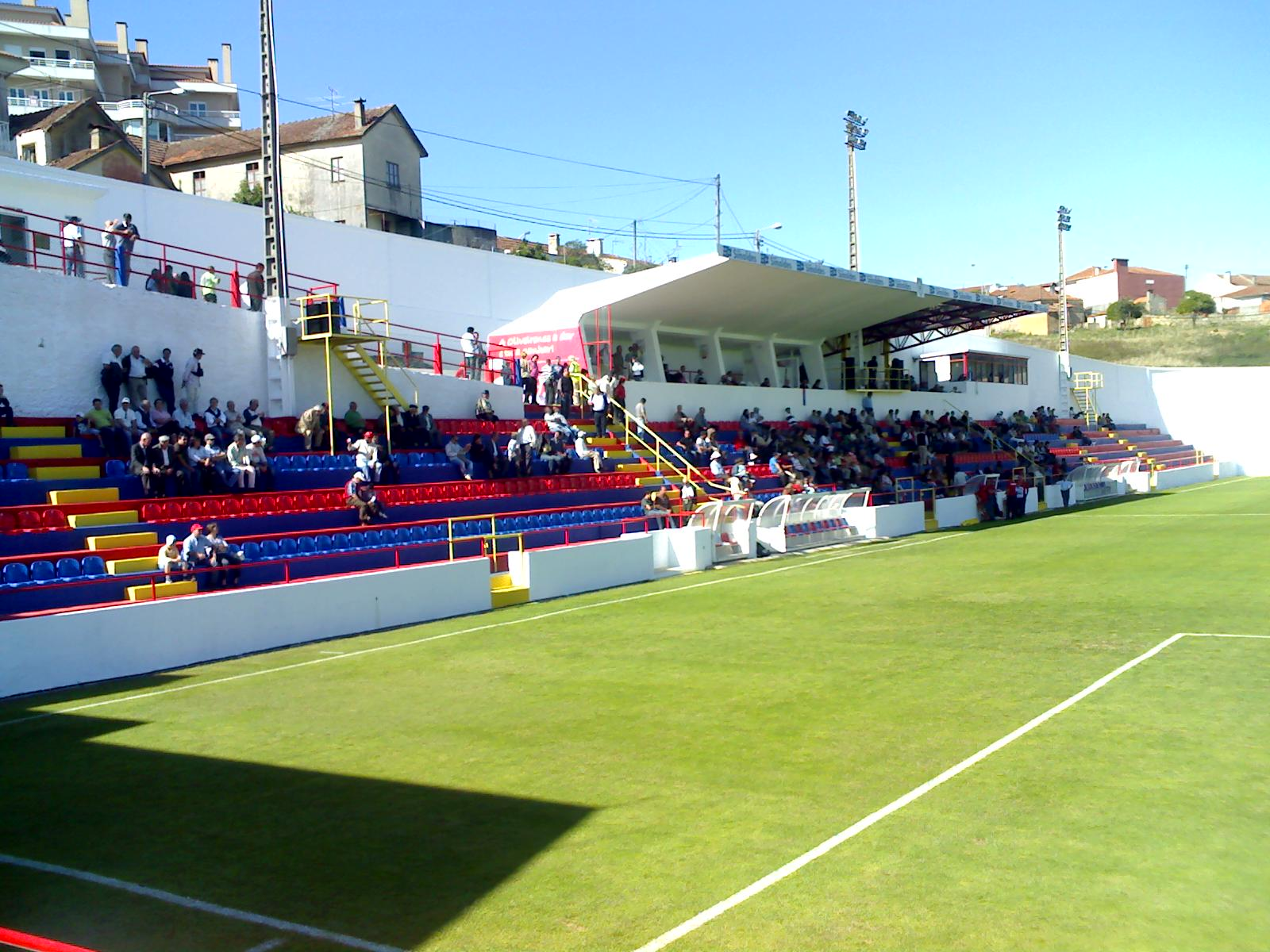
- Interactive map of Estádio Carlos Osório
- Full name: Estádio Carlos Osório
- Location: Oliveira de Azeméis, Aveiro, Portugal
- Coordinates: 40.8419°N 8.4703°W
- Owner: Oliveirense
- Capacity: 1,750
- Surface: Grass
- Field size: 100 x 65 metres

Construction
- Built: 1932
- Opened: 1932
- Renovated: 2008–2010

Tenant
- Oliveirense

Estádio Carlos Osório is a stadium in Oliveira de Azeméis, Aveiro, Portugal. It is currently used for football matches and is the home ground of Liga de Honra side U.D. Oliveirense. The ground holds a seating capacity of 1,750. The stadium is named after a local villager called Carlos Osório who gave permission to the club to construct the stadium on his piece of land.

Following Oliveirense's promotion from the Portuguese Second Division to the Liga de Honra in the 2007–08 season, the LPFP instructed the club to remodel the stadium as well as renovate it due to the professional league criteria requiring better pitch conditions.
