= Abilio =

Abilio may refer to:

- Abilio James Acosta (born 1971), American journalist
- Abílio Brandão (fl. 1948), Portuguese sports shooter
- Abílio Cabral (born 1960), Angolan boxer
- Abílio Cossa (1922–2003), Mozambican journalist and writer
- Abílio Duarte (1931–1996), Cape Verdean nationalist and politician
- Abilio Diniz (1936–2024), Brazilian businessman
- Abilio Estévez (born 1954), Cuban novelist and playwright
- Abílio Fernandes (1906–1994), Portuguese botanist and taxonomist
- Abilio Manuel Guerra Junqueiro (1850–1923), Portuguese civil servant
- Abílio Novais (born 1967), Portuguese footballer
- Abílio (footballer) (Abílio Neves dos Reis, born 1975), Brazilian football forward
- Tanela (Abílio Filipe Antunes Teixeira, born 1988), Portuguese footballer
