= Ricardo Fernandes =

Ricardo Fernandes may refer to:

- Ricardo Fernandes (badminton) (born 1972), Portuguese badminton player
- Ricardo Fernandes (footballer, born January 1978), Portuguese football defender
- Ricardo Fernandes (footballer, born April 1978), Portuguese football midfielder
- Ricardo Fernandes (footballer, born 1991), Portuguese football midfielder
- Ricardo Fernandes (footballer, born 1994), Portuguese football goalkeeper
- Ricardo Fernandes (futsal player) (born 1986), Portuguese futsal player
- Ricardo Fernandes (footballer, born 2002), Santomean football left-back

== See also ==
- Ricardinho (footballer, born November 1982), Ricardo Alves Fernandes, Brazilian football defender
