= Rafael Veloso =

Portuguese footballer

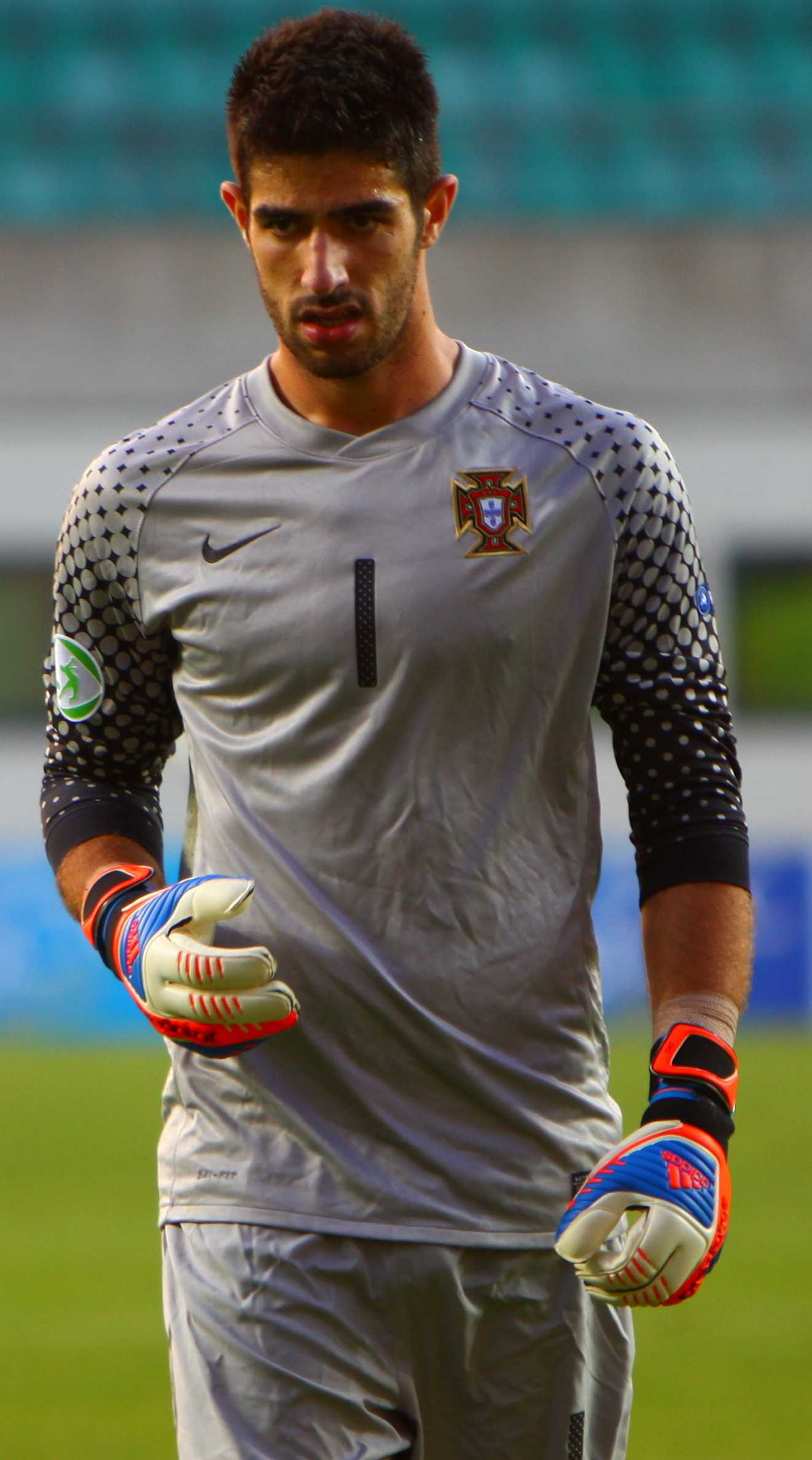
- Veloso playing for Portugal U19 in 2012

Personal information
- Full name: Rafael Henriques Vasquez Veloso
- Date of birth: 3 November 1993 (age 32)
- Place of birth: Lourinhã, Portugal
- Height: 1.92 m (6 ft 4 in)
- Position: Goalkeeper

Team information
- Current team: Gjøvik-Lyn
- Number: 1

Youth career
- 2004−2005: Lourinhanense
- 2005−2006: Torreense
- 2006−2012: Sporting CP

Senior career*
Years	Team	Apps	(Gls)
2012−2016	Belenenses	3	(0)
2014–2015	→ Deportivo La Coruña B (loan)	10	(0)
2015−2016	→ Oriental (loan)	21	(0)
2017–2018	Valdres	51	(0)
2019	ÍBV	7	(0)
2020	07 Vestur	26	(0)
2021–	Gjøvik-Lyn	131	(0)

International career
2009	Portugal U17	2	(0)
2010−2011	Portugal U18	4	(0)
2012−2013	Portugal U19	14	(0)
2013	Portugal U20	3	(0)
- * Club domestic league appearances and goals as of 10:44, 6 August 2026 (UTC)

Rafael Henriques Vasquez Veloso (born 3 November 1993) is a Portuguese professional footballer who plays as a goalkeeper for Norwegian club FK Gjøvik-Lyn.

== Club career ==
Born in Lourinhã, Lisbon District, Veloso graduated from Sporting CP's youth system, and joined C.F. Os Belenenses for his first year as a senior after a trial in England with Blackburn Rovers. He acted as a backup to Matt Jones during his first season in a promotion to the Primeira Liga, his only appearance coming on 18 May 2013 in a 2−1 home win against S.C. Freamunde where he came on as a late substitute for Filipe Mendes. He added a further two league matches in the top flight, one after replacing sent off Jones early into an eventual 2−3 home loss to C.D. Nacional also at the Estádio do Restelo.

On 25 August 2014, Veloso was loaned to Deportivo de La Coruña's reserves in a season-long deal. He returned to his homeland the following summer, signing with Clube Oriental de Lisboa also on loan.

Veloso left Belenenses in December 2016, after terminating his contract. Afterwards, he competed in Norway with Valdres FK and in Iceland with Íþróttabandalag Vestmannaeyja, on both occasions agreeing to two-year deals.

In January 2020, Veloso moved to 07 Vestur in the Faroese second tier. He returned to Norway one year later, joining third 3. divisjon club FK Gjøvik-Lyn.

== Match fixing scandal ==
On 26 May 2016, Veloso was arrested on suspicion of match fixing whilst at Oriental, which led to him being banned from playing professional football in Portugal.
