= Vasco Martins de Sousa =

Portuguese Lord

- Lord
- Born: 1320s Portugal
- Died: 24 January 1387; Portugal

Vasco Martins de Sousa Chichorro (1320s–1387) was Lord of Mortágua, and Chancellor mor under King Peter I of Portugal.

== Biography ==
His parents were Martim Afonso Chichorro II and Aldonça Anes de Briteiros. Vasco Martins was married several times, one of his wives was Inês Dias Manuel, granddaughter of Manuel of Castile and descendant of Ferdinand III of Castile and Elisabeth of Swabia.
