= Pedro Correia (footballer, born 1988) =

Portuguese footballer

Personal information
- Full name: Pedro Miguel Oliveira Correia
- Date of birth: 3 November 1988 (age 38)
- Place of birth: Vila Nova de Famalicão, Portugal
- Height: 1.90 m (6 ft 3 in)
- Position: Forward

Team information
- Current team: Paredes

Youth career
- 2001–2005: Ruivanense AC
- 2005–2007: Tirsense

Senior career*
Years	Team	Apps	(Gls)
2007–2012	Tirsense		
2010–2011	→ Rebordosa (loan)		
2012–2014	AD Oliveirense	62	(21)
2014–2017	Famalicão	76	(19)
2017–2019	Vizela	51	(15)
2019–2020	Felgueira	20	(7)
2020	Fafe	2	(0)
2021–	Paredes	40	(7)
- * Club domestic league appearances and goals as of 8 January 2023

Pedro Miguel Oliveira Correia (born 3 November 1988) is a Portuguese footballer who plays for Paredes as a forward.

== Football career ==
On 9 August 2015, Correia made his professional debut with Famalicão in a 2015–16 Segunda Liga match against Varzim.
