= Adilson (footballer, born 1982) =

Brazilian footballer

Personal information
- Full name: Adilson Tibes Granemann
- Date of birth: 1 January 1982 (age 44)
- Place of birth: Rio Campo, Santa Catarina (state), Brazil
- Height: 1.92 m (6 ft 4 in)
- Position: Forward

Senior career*
Years	Team	Apps	(Gls)
2002	Toledo Work		
2003	União São João		
2004	América		
2005	União de Rondonópolis		
2006–2007	FC Vilnius	32	(2)
2008	Botafogo-SP		
2008–2010	Feirense	50	(13)
2010–2013	Maritimo	13	(2)
2010–2011	→ Olhanense (loan)	13	(1)
2011–2012	→ Estoril Praia (loan)	23	(5)
2012–2013	→ Maritimo B (loan)	2	(0)
2013–2015	Al-Hisn	2	(0)
- * Club domestic league appearances and goals

Adilson Tibes Granemann (born 1 January 1982), known as Adilson, is a former Brazilian footballer who played as a center forward.
