= Renato Reis =

Portuguese footballer

Personal information
- Full name: Renato Hipólito Castro Reis
- Date of birth: 16 November 1990 (age 36)
- Place of birth: Aguiar, Portugal
- Height: 1.75 m (5 ft 9 in)
- Positions: Right back; right winger

Team information
- Current team: Sporting Covilhã (on loan from Aves)
- Number: 11

Youth career
- 2003–2009: Gil Vicente

Senior career*
Years	Team	Apps	(Gls)
2009–2010	Ribeirão	19	(0)
2010−2011	Santa Maria	20	(3)
2011–	Aves	154	(4)
2017–	→ Sporting Covilhã (loan)	1	(0)
- * Club domestic league appearances and goals as of 12 August 2017

Renato Hipólito Castro Reis (born 16 November 1990) is a Portuguese footballer who plays for Sporting Covilhã on loan from C.D. Aves, as a forward.
