= Mortágua =

- Municipality
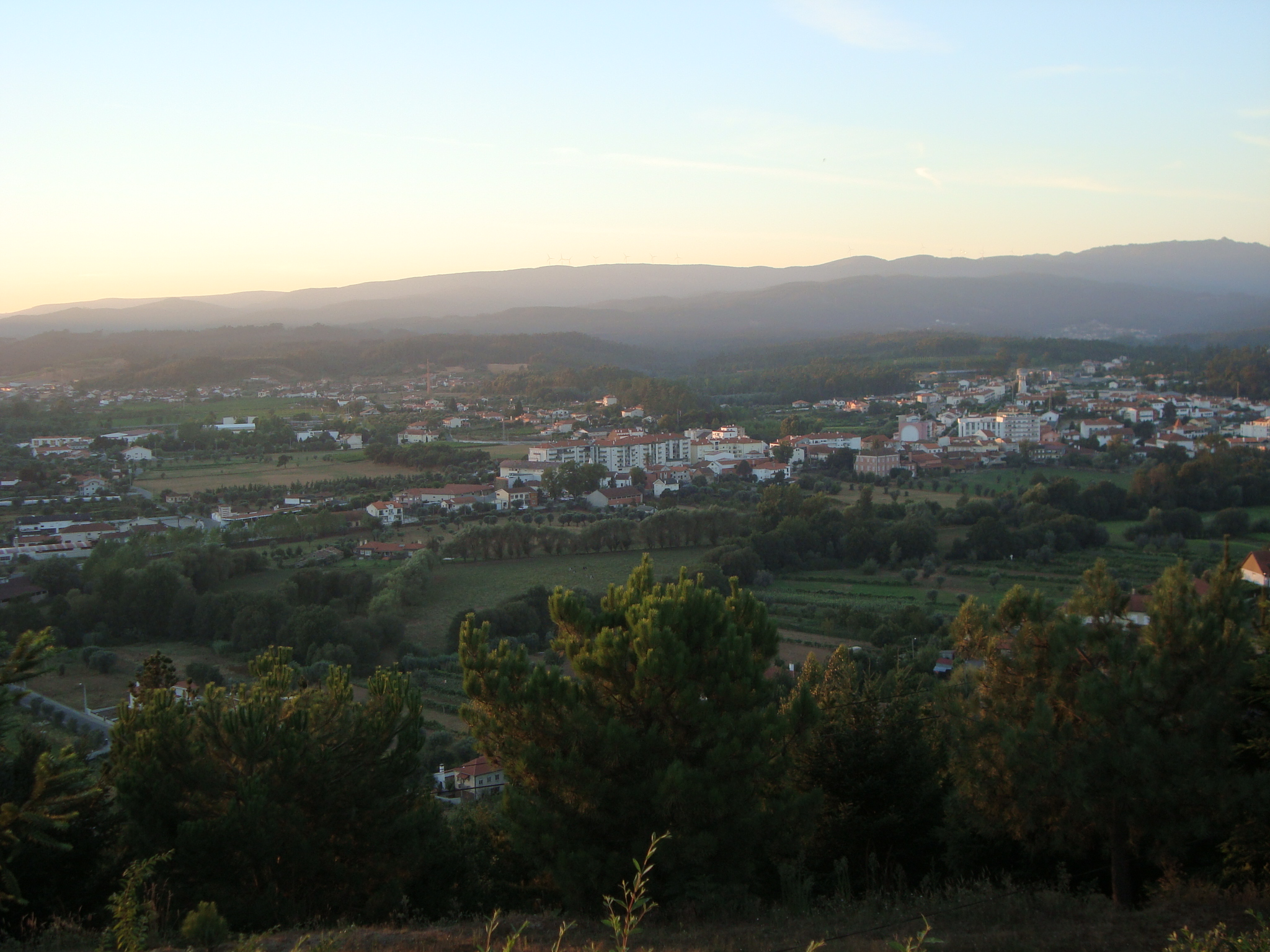
- View of Mortágua valley

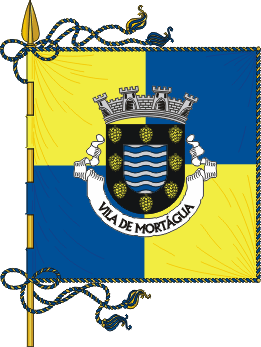
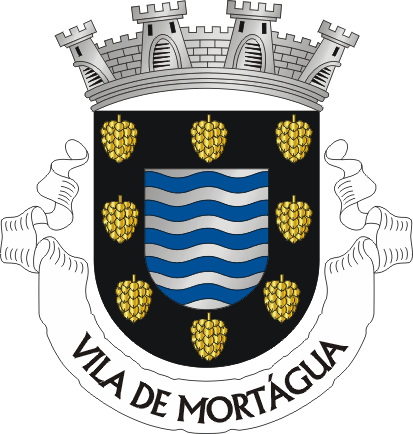
- Flag Coat of arms
- Interactive map of Mortágua
- Coordinates: 40°26′N 8°14′W
- Country: Portugal
- Region: Centro
- Intermunic. comm.: Região de Coimbra
- District: Viseu
- Parishes: 7

Government
  - President: Ricardo Pardal ([[Socialist Party (Portugal)])

Area
  - Total: 251.18 km^{2} (96.98 sq mi)

Population (2011)
  - Total: 9,607
  - Density: 38.25/km^{2} (99.06/sq mi)
- Time zone: UTC+00:00 (WET)
  - Summer (DST): UTC+01:00 (WEST)
- Local holiday: Holy Thursday
- Website: www.cm-mortagua.pt

Mortágua (European Portuguese: [muɾˈtaɣwɐ] or [mɔɾˈtaɣwɐ]) is a municipality in the district of Viseu, Portugal. The population in 2011 was 9,607, in an area of 251.18 square kilometres (96.98 sq mi).

The present mayor is Ricardo Sérgio Pardal, elected in 2021 by the Socialist Party.

== History ==
Legend suggests that that village was formed on a lake; settlers recalled that Água Morta (dead water) existed here, but no physiological evidence remains of the body of water. Over time, the name stayed and evolved, becoming the variant today of the local municipality.

About 1 kilometre (0.62 mi) from the main village is a hill, covered in vegetation, but whose lateral flank was occupied by a Moorish settlement known as Crasto. Over a cliff archeologists discovered several homes including a building that was defined as a kitchen, on its edge.

By 1895, several chapels were situated on this hilltop, which had become known as Cabeça da Senhora do Mundo (owing to the existence of an image to that invocation).

== Geography ==
Administratively, the municipality is divided into 7 civil parishes (freguesias):

- Cercosa
- Espinho
- Marmeleira
- Mortágua, Vale de Remígio, Cortegaça e Almaça
- Pala
- Sobral
- Trezói

== Notable people ==
- Vasco Martins de Sousa (1320s-1387) Lord of Mortágua
- Fernanda de Paiva Tomás (1928–1984) a member of the Portuguese Communist Party, a political prisoner from 1961 to 1970, under the authoritarian Estado Novo regime.

=== Sport ===
- Francisco Neto (born 1981) a football manager, currently the head coach of the Portugal women's national football team
- Filipe Sarmento (born 1985 in Mortágua) a Portuguese footballer with over 220 club caps
