= Fábio Marinheiro =

Portuguese footballer (born 1988)

Personal information
- Full name: Fábio André Cruz Marinheiro
- Date of birth: 11 November 1988 (age 38)
- Place of birth: Montijo, Portugal
- Height: 1.85 m (6 ft 1 in)
- Position: Defender

Team information
- Current team: Os Belenenses

Youth career
- 2000–2007: Montijo

Senior career*
Years	Team	Apps	(Gls)
2006–2007	Montijo		
2007–2008	União de Montemor		
2008–2010	Alcochetense		
2010–2011	Casa Pia		
2011–2012	Estrela de Vendas Novas	28	(1)
2012–2013	Fabril Barreiro	26	(0)
2013–2014	Atlético CP	33	(1)
2014–2015	Benfica e Castelo Branco	30	(0)
2015–2016	Olhanense	39	(0)
2016–2017	Mafra	14	(0)
2017–2018	Sintrense	28	(0)
2018–2019	Loures	32	(2)
2019–2020	Torreense	23	(0)
2020–2021	Oriental	14	(0)
2021–	Os Belenenses	4	(0)
- * Club domestic league appearances and goals as of 29 October 2021

Fábio André Cruz Marinheiro (born 11 November 1988) is a Portuguese footballer who plays for Os Belenenses as a defender.

== Football career ==
On 27 July 2013, Marinheiro made his professional debut with Atlético CP in a 2013–14 Taça da Liga match against Académico Viseu.
