= Paulo Roberto (footballer, born 1985) =

Brazilian footballer

Personal information
- Full name: Paulo Roberto Cardoso Rodrigues
- Date of birth: 4 July 1985 (age 41)
- Place of birth: Rio de Janeiro, Brazil
- Height: 1.84 m (6 ft 1/2 in)
- Position: Forward

Senior career*
| Years | Team | Apps | (Gls) |
| 2007 | Condor | | |
| 2008 | São Pedro da Cova | | |
| 2008–2009 | Sanjoanense | 14 | (1) |
| 2009–2010 | Régua | | |
| 2010–2012 | Mirandela | 61 | (17) |
| 2012–2013 | Belenenses | 15 | (0) |
| 2013 | → Penafiel (loan) | 13 | (2) |
| 2013–2014 | Penafiel | 22 | (2) |
| 2014 | Académico de Viseu | 13 | (0) |
| 2015 | Freamunde | 10 | (0) |
| 2015–2016 | Mirandela | 28 | (11) |
| 2016–2019 | Montalegre | 84 | (20) |
| 2019–2020 | Bragança | 22 | (8) |
| 2020–2021 | Macedo de Cavaleiros | 5 | (2) |
- * Club domestic league appearances and goals as of 1 August 2021

Paulo Roberto Cardoso Rodrigues, known as Paulo Roberto (born 4 July 1985) is a Brazilian football player.

== Club career ==
He made his professional debut in the Segunda Liga for Belenenses on 22 August 2012 in a game against Braga B.
