= Bruno Sapo =

Portuguese footballer

Personal information
- Full name: Bruno Tiago Conceição Bernardo
- Date of birth: 3 March 1986 (age 40)
- Place of birth: Lisbon, Portugal
- Height: 1.83 m (6 ft 0 in)
- Position: Defender

Team information
- Current team: Vitória Setúbal

Youth career
- 1997–2001: Benfica
- 2001–2002: SL Olivais
- 2003–2005: Belenenses

Senior career*
Years	Team	Apps	(Gls)
2005–2008	Atlético do Cacém		
2008	Madalena		
2009	Portosantense		
2009	Sintrense		
2010	Vitória do Pico		
2010–2011	Moura		
2011–2013	Farense	37	(3)
2013	Quarteirense	4	(0)
2014	Moura	16	(4)
2014–2015	Louletano	27	(2)
2015	Loures	16	(2)
2016–2017	Cova da Piedade	42	(3)
2017–2019	Farense	51	(2)
2019–2020	Loures	19	(4)
2020–2021	Cova da Piedade	21	(0)
2021–	Vitória Setúbal	4	(0)
- * Club domestic league appearances and goals as of 31 October 2021

Bruno Tiago Conceição Bernardo, known as Bruno Sapo (born 3 March 1986) is a Portuguese footballer who plays as a defender for Vitória Setúbal.

== Career ==
Bruno Sapo made his professional debut in the Segunda Liga for Cova da Piedade on 14 August 2016 in a game against Leixoes.
