= Pedro Caipiro =

Portuguese footballer (born 1987)

Personal information
- Full name: Pedro Henrique Parreira Alves Caipiro
- Date of birth: 14 January 1987 (age 39)
- Place of birth: Loures, Portugal
- Height: 1.75 m (5 ft 9 in)
- Position: Defender

Youth career
- 1997–1998: Zambujalense
- 1998–2001: Loures
- 2001–2002: Alverca
- 2002–2003: Loures
- 2003–2005: Alverca
- 2005–2006: Loures

Senior career*
| Years | Team | Apps | (Gls) |
| 2006–2007 | Loures | | |
| 2007–2009 | Oriental | | |
| 2009–2011 | Pinhalnovense | 38 | (0) |
| 2011 | Operário | 1 | (0) |
| 2012 | Pêro Pinheiro | 18 | (1) |
| 2012–2013 | Fátima | 30 | (1) |
| 2013–2014 | Atlético CP | 32 | (0) |
| 2014–2015 | Loures | 26 | (2) |
| 2015–2016 | Sintrense | 17 | (0) |
| 2016 | Mafra | 14 | (0) |
| 2016–2017 | Sintrense | 27 | (1) |
| 2018–2020 | Malveira | 38 | (2) |
| 2020–2021 | Atlético CP | 0 | (0) |
- * Club domestic league appearances and goals as of 1 August 2021

Pedro Henrique Parreira Alves Caipiro (born 14 January 1987) is a Portuguese football player.

== Club career ==
He made his professional debut in the Segunda Liga for Atlético CP on 11 August 2013 in a game against Sporting B.
