= Filipe Sarmento =

Portuguese footballer (born 1985)

Personal information
- Full name: Filipe Sucena Morais Sarmento
- Date of birth: 16 March 1985 (age 41)
- Place of birth: Mortágua, Portugal
- Height: 1.81 m (5 ft 11 in)
- Position: Wingback

Team information
- Current team: Marinhense

Youth career
- 1993–2001: Taboeira
- 2001–2004: Académica

Senior career*
Years	Team	Apps	(Gls)
2003–2004	Académica B	13	(0)
2004–2010	Académica	33	(1)
2006–2007	→ Tourizense (loan)	3	(0)
2008	→ Varzim (loan)	8	(1)
2009	→ Covilhã (loan)	7	(0)
2009–2010	→ Tourizense (loan)	21	(1)
2010–2013	Pampilhosa	76	(4)
2013–2014	Fátima	25	(3)
2014–2016	Lusitanos Saint-Maur	22	(0)
2016–2017	Pampilhosa	13	(0)
2017–	Marinhense	21	(1)

International career
2006	Portugal U20	2	(0)
- * Club domestic league appearances and goals as of 6 May 2018

Filipe Sucena Morais Sarmento (born 16 March 1985 in Mortágua, Viseu District) is a Portuguese footballer who plays for A.C. Marinhense as a right back or a right midfielder.
