= Dally Gbale =

Ivorian footballer

Personal information
- Full name: Dally Cyrille Innocent Gbale
- Date of birth: 1 January 1987 (age 39)
- Place of birth: Abidjan, Ivory Coast
- Height: 1.77 m (5 ft 10 in)
- Position: Forward

Senior career*
Years	Team	Apps	(Gls)
2007–2009	Camacha	41	(12)
2009	Beira-Mar	1	(0)
2009–2010	Camacha	22	(10)
2010–2011	Mirandela	27	(13)
2011–2013	Aves	43	(11)
2013–2014	Tondela	29	(3)
2014–2015	Freamunde	36	(5)
2015–2016	Trikala	17	(2)
2016–2017	Jeunesse Canach	12	(2)
- * Club domestic league appearances and goals as of 27 August 2017

Dally Cyrille Innocent Gbale (born 1 January 1987 in Abidjan) is an Ivorian professional footballer who plays as a forward.
