= Ruizinho (footballer, born 1989) =

Portuguese footballer

Personal information
- Full name: Rui Miguel Cabral Furtado
- Date of birth: 13 March 1989 (age 37)
- Place of birth: Ponta Delgada, Portugal
- Height: 1.79 m (5 ft 10 1/2 in)
- Position: Midfielder

Team information
- Current team: Oriental
- Number: 88

Youth career
- 1999–2008: CU Micaelense

Senior career*
Years	Team	Apps	(Gls)
2008–2009	CU Micaelense	11	(0)
2009–2012	Operário	74	(8)
2012–2016	Belenenses	7	(0)
2013–2015	→ Santa Clara (loan)	42	(2)
2015–2016	→ Casa Pia (loan)	3	(0)
2016–2018	Operário	48	(8)
2018–2019	Oriental	26	(4)
2019–2020	Real	19	(3)
2020–	Oriental	-	(-)
- * Club domestic league appearances and goals as of 18:10, 15 May 2020 (UTC)

Rui Miguel Cabral Furtado (born 13 March 1989) known as Ruizinho, is a Portuguese footballer who plays for Oriental as a midfielder.
