= Luís Olim =

Portuguese footballer

Personal information
- Full name: Luís Miguel de Olim Andrade
- Date of birth: 27 August 1981 (age 45)
- Place of birth: Funchal, Portugal
- Height: 1.68 m (5 ft 6 in)
- Position: Defender

Youth career
- 1990–1999: Marítimo

Senior career*
Years	Team	Apps	(Gls)
1999–2015	Marítimo B	248	(20)
2001–2015	Marítimo	89	(0)
Total		337	(20)

International career
2001–2002	Portugal U20	8	(1)

Managerial career
- 2015–2018: Marítimo B (assistant)
- 2018–2020: Marítimo (assistant)
- 2021: Panevėžys (assistant)
- * Club domestic league appearances and goals

Luís Miguel de Olim Andrade (born 27 August 1981), known as Olim, is a Portuguese former professional footballer. A versatile defender, he could play on either flank or in the middle.

== Club career ==
After graduating from the youth academy at hometown's C.S. Marítimo in 2000, Funchal-born Olim spent his entire career with the Madeira club, but never managed to hold down a regular starting place. He made his Primeira Liga debut on 28 January 2001, playing 90 minutes in a 2–0 away loss against Gil Vicente FC, and finished his first season with the main squad with only three league appearances.

For the duration of his spell, Olim also featured regularly for the B team in both the second and third divisions. He retired in June 2015, two months shy of his 34th birthday, being appointed assistant coach at precisely the reserves.

== International career ==
Olim participated with the Portugal under-20 side at the 2001 Toulon Tournament, scoring in the 4–1 group-stage win over Japan for the eventual champions.

== See also ==
- List of one-club men
