= Duarte Machado =

Portuguese footballer (born 1983)

Personal information
- Full name: Duarte Brás Carneiro Costa Taveiro Machado
- Date of birth: 12 February 1983 (age 43)
- Place of birth: Lisbon, Portugal
- Height: 1.77 m (5 ft 10 in)
- Position: Defender

Youth career
- 1996–1998: Luso Barreiro
- 1998–2002: Sporting CP

Senior career*
Years	Team	Apps	(Gls)
2002–2003	União Santiago		
2003–2005	Casa Pia	36	(0)
2005–2007	Olivais Moscavide	49	(0)
2007–2010	Fátima	64	(3)
2010–2014	Belenenses	91	(0)
2014−2015	Olhanense	38	(0)
2015−2016	Atlético	36	(0)
Total		314	(3)
- * Club domestic league appearances and goals

Duarte Brás Carneiro Costa Taveiro Machado (born 12 February 1983) is a Portuguese retired footballer who played mainly as right-back.

== Playing career ==
Born in Lisbon, Machado played youth football at Sporting CP from ages 15 to 19. He made his senior debut with amateurs União Sport Clube, and went on to compete in the lower leagues until 2006, also representing Casa Pia A.C. and C.D. Olivais e Moscavide and achieving promotion to the Segunda Liga in the latter season.

Until 2013, Machado played almost exclusively in the second tier or Portuguese football, with C.D. Fátima and C.F. Os Belenenses. Whilst with the latter club, he contributed 39 games in the 2012–13 campaign – 38 starts – as it returned to the Primeira Liga after a three-year absence.

Machado made his debut in the top flight on 15 September 2013, playing the full 90 minutes in a 2–1 away loss against Académica de Coimbra. The previous month, still during preseason, he suffered a thigh injury that ruled him out for four weeks.

Machado retired in 2016 at the age of 34, after one season apiece in the second division with S.C. Olhanense and Atlético Clube de Portugal.

== Coaching career ==
Machado started working as a manager shortly after retiring, going on to be in charge of several teams in the lower leagues.

== Career statistics ==
Appearances and goals by club, season and competition
Season	Club	League			National Cup		League Cup		Other		Total	
Season	Club	Division	Apps	Goals	Apps	Goals	Apps	Goals	Apps	Goals	Apps	Goals
Casa Pia	2003–04	Terceira Divisão	0	0	1	0	—		—		1	0
Casa Pia	2004–05	Segunda Divisão	36	0	1	0	—		—		37	0
Casa Pia	Total		36	0	2	0	0	0	0	0	38	0
Olivais Moscavide	2005–06	Segunda Divisão	24	0	0	0	—		—		24	0
Olivais Moscavide	2006–07	Segunda Liga	25	0	1	0	—		—		26	0
Olivais Moscavide	Total		49	0	1	0	0	0	0	0	50	0
Fátima	2007–08	Segunda Liga	24	0	2	0	5	0	—		31	0
Fátima	2008–09	Segunda Divisão	25	2	1	0	0	0	3 (Note: Appearances in Segunda Divisão playoffs)	0	29	2
Fátima	2009–10	Segunda Liga	15	1	0	0	4	0	—		19	1
Fátima	Total		64	3	3	0	9	0	3	0	79	3
Belenenses	2010–11	Segunda Liga	10	0	0	0	2	0	—		12	0
Belenenses	2011–12	Segunda Liga	25	0	4	0	4	0	—		33	0
Belenenses	2012–13	Segunda Liga	39	0	4	0	3	0	—		46	0
Belenenses	2013–14	Primeira Liga	17	0	1	0	4	0	—		22	0
Belenenses	Total		91	0	9	0	13	0	0	0	113	0
Olhanense	2014–15	Segunda Liga	38	0	2	0	2	0	—		42	0
Atlético	2015–16	Segunda Liga	36	0	0	0	2	0	—		38	0
Career total			314	3	17	0	26	0	3	0	360	3
