= Tiago Caeiro =

Portuguese footballer (born 1984)

Personal information
- Full name: Tiago David Janeiro Caeiro
- Date of birth: 29 March 1984 (age 42)
- Place of birth: Vila Franca de Xira, Portugal
- Height: 1.92 m (6 ft 4 in)
- Position: Forward

Team information
- Current team: União Santarém (assistant)

Youth career
- 1993–1995: Vilafranquense
- 1995–1998: Benfica
- 1998–2002: Vilafranquense

Senior career*
Years	Team	Apps	(Gls)
2002–2004	Villafranquense	57	(8)
2004–2005	Carregado		
2005–2006	Estrela Vendas Novas		
2006	Atlético Cacém		
2006–2009	Operário	44	(9)
2009–2010	Juventude Évora	21	(6)
2010–2012	Atlético	49	(17)
2012–2018	Belenenses	122	(28)
2019–2020	Fátima	20	(2)
2020–2021	Oriental Dragon	12	(1)

Managerial career
- 2021: B-SAD U23 (assistant)
- 2022: B-SAD (assistant)
- 2022–2023: Amora (assistant)
- 2023–: União Santarém (assistant)
- * Club domestic league appearances and goals

Tiago David Janeiro Caeiro (born 29 March 1984) is a Portuguese former professional footballer who played as a forward, currently assistant manager of União de Santarém.

== Playing career ==
=== Early years ===
Born in Vila Franca de Xira, Lisbon District, Caeiro played in the lower leagues until the age of 27. In the 2010–11 season, he scored 11 goals for Atlético Clube de Portugal to help the club return to the Segunda Liga after a lengthy absence (13 in all competitions), then proceeded to net a further six in ten games to kickstart the following campaign.

=== Belenenses ===
Caeiro signed for neighbouring C.F. Os Belenenses in the summer of 2012, contributing 13 goals in 30 matches as his team returned to the Primeira Liga after three years. He made his debut in the Portuguese top flight on 21 September 2013, aged 29, playing 60 minutes in a 1–0 home win against C.S. Marítimo.

During a league fixture at Gil Vicente F.C. in April 2014, Caeiro suffered a thigh injury that nearly ended his career, but eventually recovered fully. On 17 May 2015 he scored his first goal of the season, the 1–1 home draw against FC Porto meaning that S.L. Benfica were automatically crowned champions after a goalless tie at Vitória de Guimarães.

Caeiro was used as a substitute during the better part of his spell at the Estádio do Restelo. He scored his only goal in the UEFA Europa League on 20 August 2015, in a 1–0 away victory over SC Rheindorf Altach in the play-off round.

=== Fátima ===
On 8 August 2019, the 35-year-old Caeiro joined C.D. Fátima of the Portuguese third division.

== Coaching career ==
After retiring, Caeiro worked as assistant manager at B-SAD (under-23 and senior teams), Amora F.C. and União de Santarém.

== Honours ==
Belenenses

- Segunda Liga: 2012–13
