= Luís Zambujo =

Portuguese footballer

Personal information
- Full name: Luís Rafael Margaça Garcia Zambujo
- Date of birth: 29 September 1986 (age 40)
- Place of birth: Portel, Portugal
- Height: 1.83 m (6 ft 0 in)
- Position: Winger

Youth career
- 1996–2005: Benfica

Senior career*
Years	Team	Apps	(Gls)
2005–2006	Benfica B	25	(3)
2006–2007	Olivais Moscavide	3	(0)
2007–2008	Aves	13	(0)
2008–2009	Atlético	15	(0)
2009	Oriental	8	(2)
2010	Igreja Nova	14	(2)
2010–2011	Farense	30	(9)
2011–2012	Portimonense	19	(3)
2012	Belenenses	9	(0)
2013–2017	Portimonense	147	(21)
2017–2018	Farense	19	(0)
2018–2019	Louletano	9	(0)
Total		311	(40)

International career
2002	Portugal U16	6	(0)
2003	Portugal U17	2	(0)
2004	Portugal U18	3	(0)
2005	Portugal U19	2	(0)
- * Club domestic league appearances and goals

Luís Rafael Margaça Garcia Zambujo (born 29 September 1986) is a Portuguese former professional footballer who played as a winger.

== Club career ==
Born in Portel, Évora District, Zambujo played youth football with S.L. Benfica. He made his debut as a professional in 2006 with C.D. Olivais e Moscavide in the Segunda Liga, and alternated between that tier and the third in the following years.

In the summer of 2011, Zambujo signed with Portimonense S.C. of the second division. In January 2013, after a brief spell with C.F. Os Belenenses in the same league, he returned to his previous club, scoring his first two goals in the competition to help to a 4–0 home win against C.D. Tondela.
