= Oliveira de Azeméis, Santiago de Riba-Ul, Ul, Macinhata da Seixa e Madail =

- Civil parish
- Location in Portugal
- Coordinates: 40.840°N 8.475°W
- Country: Portugal
- Region: Norte
- Metropolitan area: Porto
- District: Aveiro
- Municipality: Oliveira de Azeméis

Area
  - Total: 25.94 km^{2} (10.02 sq mi)

Population (2011)
  - Total: 20,760
  - Density: 800/km^{2} (2,100/sq mi)
- Time zone: UTC+00:00 (WET)
  - Summer (DST): UTC+01:00 (WEST)

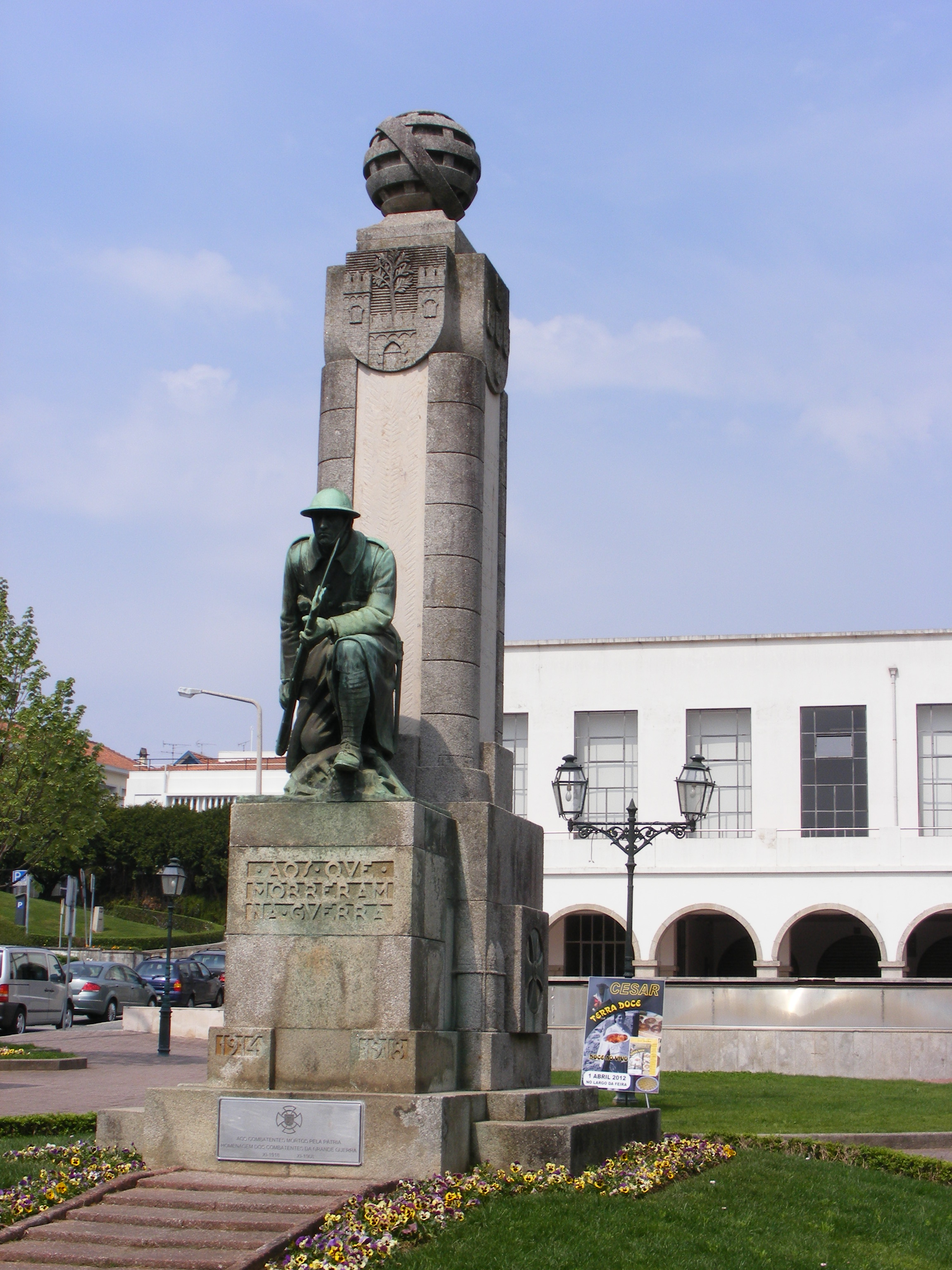
Monument in Oliveira de Azeméis to soldiers killed in World War I

Oliveira de Azeméis, Santiago de Riba-Ul, Ul, Macinhata da Seixa e Madail is a civil parish in the municipality of Oliveira de Azeméis in Porto Metropolitan Area, Portugal. It was formed in 2013 by the merger of the former parishes Oliveira de Azeméis, Santiago de Riba-Ul, Ul, Macinhata da Seixa and Madail. The population in 2011 was 20,760, in an area of 25.94 km^{2}.

== Sports ==
Its most important sports club is the U.D.O. União Desportiva Oliveirense which fields teams in football, basketball and ring hockey. One other club is Futebol Clube Pinheirense (FCP), a club dedicated mostly to football. They have a kids school in partnership with Benfica.
