= Filipe Mendes =

Portuguese footballer (born 1985)

Personal information
- Full name: Filipe José Lima Mendes
- Date of birth: 17 June 1985 (age 41)
- Place of birth: Lisbon, Portugal
- Height: 1.93 m (6 ft 4 in)
- Position: Goalkeeper

Youth career
- 1993–1997: Pescadores
- 1997–1998: Benfica
- 1998–1999: Pescadores
- 1999–2000: Académica
- 2000–2004: Estrela Amadora

Senior career*
Years	Team	Apps	(Gls)
2004–2009	Estrela Amadora	5	(0)
2005–2007	→ Tourizense (loan)	25	(0)
2009–2010	Paços Ferreira	0	(0)
2010–2011	Santa Clara	6	(0)
2011–2012	Lousada	14	(0)
2012–2018	Belenenses	9	(0)
2016	→ Real Massamá (loan)	12	(0)
2018–2020	B-SAD	0	(0)
2018–2019	→ Real Massamá (loan)	33	(0)
2019–2020	→ Casa Pia (loan)	1	(0)
2020–2021	Real Massamá	16	(0)
Total		121	(0)

International career
2001	Portugal U15	1	(0)
2004	Portugal U19	2	(0)
- * Club domestic league appearances and goals

Filipe José Lima Mendes (born 17 June 1985) is a Portuguese former professional footballer who played as a goalkeeper.
