= Tanela =

Portuguese footballer

Personal information
- Full name: Abílio Filipe Antunes Teixeira
- Date of birth: 15 October 1988 (age 38)
- Place of birth: Braga, Portugal
- Height: 1.85 m (6 ft 1 in)
- Position: Forward

Team information
- Current team: Dumiense/CJP II
- Number: 99

Youth career
- 2001–2014: Lago
- 2004–2007: Merelinense

Senior career*
Years	Team	Apps	(Gls)
2007–2008	Merelinense	12	(3)
2008–2010	Limianos	57	(20)
2010–2011	Merelinense	14	(1)
2011–2013	Limianos	53	(16)
2013–2015	Varzim	52	(6)
2016	Limianos	11	(2)
2016–2017	Merelinense	25	(5)
2017–2018	Vilaverdense	5	(0)
2018	Aliança de Gandra	6	(0)
2018–2020	Maria da Fonte	41	(11)
2020–	Dumiense/CJP II		
- * Club domestic league appearances and goals as of 20:16, 25 January 2021 (UTC)

Abílio Filipe Antunes Teixeira, known as Tanela (born 15 October 1988) is a Portuguese football player who plays for Dumiense/CJP II.

== Club career ==
He made his professional debut in the Segunda Liga for Varzim on 9 December 2015 in a game against Santa Clara.
