= Ricardo Fernandes (footballer, born 1991) =

Portuguese footballer

Personal information
- Full name: Ricardo Miguel Coelho Fernandes
- Date of birth: 29 September 1991 (age 35)
- Place of birth: Funchal, Portugal
- Height: 1.82 m (5 ft 11 1/2 in)
- Position: Midfielder

Team information
- Current team: Câmara Lobos

Youth career
- 1999–2007: Câmara Lobos
- 2007–2010: Nacional

Senior career*
Years	Team	Apps	(Gls)
2010–2012	Nacional	1	(0)
2011–2012	→ Camacha (loan)	29	(2)
2012–2013	União Madeira	10	(1)
2013–2015	Marítimo B	7	(0)
2015–2017	Camacha	43	(1)
2017–2018	Câmara Lobos	29	(5)
2018–2019	União Madeira	4	(0)
2018–2019	→ Câmara Lobos (loan)	15	(1)
2019	Camacha	11	(0)
2020–	Câmara Lobos	0	(0)
- * Club domestic league appearances and goals as of 18:34, 23 August 2020 (UTC)

Ricardo Miguel Coelho Fernandes (born 29 September 1991 in Funchal, Madeira) is a Portuguese footballer who plays for C.S.D. Câmara de Lobos as a midfielder.
