= Martins (surname) =

Martins is a Portuguese surname. Origin: Germanic patronymic for son of Martin. Cognates of this surname occur in many other European languages (Martinsson, Mortensson, Mortensen, Martini, Martinez, Martinov, Martinenko, Maartens, Martinsky, Martinescu, etc). Notable people with the surname include:

== A ==
- Abraão Lincoln Martins (born 1983), Brazilian striker
- Adriano Martins (born 1982), Brazilian mixed martial artist
- Adriano Martins (footballer) (born 1997), Brazilian footballer
- Adriano Ferreira Martins (born 1982), Brazilian footballer
- Alberto Martins (born 1945), Portuguese lawyer and politician
- Aldemir Martins (1922–2006), Brazilian artist
- Alex Martins (basketball) (born 1964), American sports executive
- Alex Martins (futsal player) (born 1980), Brazilian futsal player
- Alvaro Martins (footballer) (1901–?), Brazilian footballer
- Ana Martins (born 1972), Angolan swimmer
- Ana Filipa Martins (born 1996), Portuguese female artistic gymnast
- Ana Maria Guerra Martins (born 1963), Portuguese jurist and judge
- Ana Paula Martins (born 1965), Portuguese politician
- Anderson Martins (born 1987), Brazilian footballer
- André Martins (footballer, born 1987) (born 1987), Portuguese footballer
- André Martins (footballer, born 1989) (born 1989), Portuguese footballer
- André Martins (footballer, born 1990) (born 1990), Portuguese footballer
- Ângelo Martins (1930–2020), Portuguese footballer
- António Martins (footballer) (1913–?), Portuguese footballer
- António Martins (sport shooter, born 1892) (1892–1930), Portuguese sports shooter
- António Martins (sport shooter, born 1930) (born 1930), Portuguese sports shooter
- António Alves Martins (1808–1882), Portuguese bishop
- Armando Martins (1905–?), Portuguese footballer
- Aurélio Martins (born 1966), São Toméan journalist, businessman and politician
- Avelino Martins (1905–1982), Portuguese footballer

== B ==
- Bayo Martins (1932–2003), Nigerian jazz musician
- Beatriz Martins (born 1994), Portuguese trampoline gymnast
- Ben Martins (born 1956), South African politician
- Bernarda Gonçalves Martins, Angolan politician
- Bernardo Martins (born 1997), Portuguese footballer
- Bruno Martins Indi (born 1992), Portuguese-born Dutch footballer

== C ==
- Caio Vianna Martins (1923–1938), Brazilian Scout
- Carlos Martins (musician) (born 1961), Portuguese saxophonist, jazz musician and composer
- Carlos Martins (footballer) (born 1982), Portuguese footballer
- Carlos Wizard Martins (born 1956), Brazilian entrepreneur and founder of Gurpo Multi
- Caroline Martins (born 1992), Brazilian handball player
- Catarina Martins (born 1973), member of the Parliament of Portugal
- César Henrique Martins (born 1992), Brazilian footballer
- Charles Frédéric Martins (1806–1889), French physician, botanist, geologist and translator
- Chineme Martins (1997–2020), Nigerian footballer
- Christopher Martins (born 1997), Luxembourgish footballer
- Claudiano Martins Filho (born 1989), Brazilian politician
- Corentin Martins (born 1969), French footballer
- Cristina Martins, Portuguese-Canadian politician

== D ==
- Dan Martins (born 1951), American Anglican bishop
- Daniel Martins (athlete), Brazilian Paralympic athlete
- Daniel Martins (Portuguese footballer) (born 1993), Portuguese footballer
- Daniel Martins (footballer, born 1972) (born 1972), Brazilian footballer
- David Martins, Brazilian footballer
- David Martins (cricketer) (born 1930), Guyanese cricketer
- Danilo Monteiro Martins (born 1998), Brazilian basketball player
- Dênio Martins (born 1977), Brazilian footballer
- Dénis Martins (born 1997), Portuguese footballer
- Dhiego Martins (born 1988), Brazilian footballer
- Diego Martins (born 1983), Brazilian footballer
- Diego Jota Martins (born 1987), Brazilian footballer

== E ==
- Edgar Martins (born 1977), Portuguese photographer and author
- Edgar Martins (swimmer), Mozambican swimmer
- Edson Martins (born 1989), Brazilian bobsledder
- Édson Campos Martins (1930–1991), Brazilian footballer
- Eduardo Ramos Martins (born 1986), Brazilian footballer
- Edward Martins (born 1933), Liberian sprinter
- Eliane Martins (born 1986), Brazilian long jumper
- Élio Martins (born 1985), Portuguese footballer
- Eric Martins (born 1972), American baseball coach
- Erivelto Martins (born 1954), Brazilian footballer

== F ==
- Fabinho Martins (born 1996), Portuguese footballer
- Fábio Martins (born 1993), Portuguese footballer
- Felipe Martins (footballer, born November 1990) (born 1990), Brazilian footballer
- Felipe Martins (footballer, born September 1990) (born 1990), Brazilian footballer
- Felipe Campanholi Martins (born 1990), Brazilian footballer
- Felipe Trevizan Martins (born 1987), Brazilian footballer
- Fernanda Martins (born 1988), Brazilian athlete
- Fernando Martins (born 1952), Brazilian boxer
- Fernando Lucas Martins (born 1992), Brazilian footballer
- Filipa Martins (athlete) (born 1992), Portuguese sprinter
- Filipe Martins (born 1978), Portuguese footballer
- Franklin Martins (born 1948), Brazilian journalist
- Fred Martins (born 1988), Nigerian artist
- Funmi Martins (1963–2002), Nigerian actress

== G ==
- Gabi Martins (born 1996), Brazilian singer
- Gaspar Martins (born 1940), Angolan ambassador
- Gaspar da Silveira Martins (1835–1901), Brazilian politician
- Gelson Martins (born 1995), Portuguese footballer
- Geraldo Martins, Bissau-Guinean economist and politician
- Geraldo Antônio Martins (1940–2018), Brazilian footballer
- Glan Martins (born 1996), Indian footballer
- Guilherme d'Oliveira Martins (born 1952), Portuguese lawyer and politician

== H ==
- Helvécio Martins (1930–2005), first person of Black African descent to be called as a general authority of LDS Church
- Henrique Martins (born 1991), Brazilian swimmer
- Henrique Wilsons Da Cruz Martins (born 1997), Timor-Leste footballer
- Herivelto Martins (1912–1992), Brazilian composer, singer and music player
- Humberto Martins (born 1961), Brazilian actor

== I ==
- Ibiapaba Martins (1917–1985), Brazilian lawyer
- Ingrid Gamarra Martins (born 1996), Brazilian tennis player
- Isabel Martins, Mozambican politician
- Ismael Martins (born 1940), Angolan diplomat and political figure
- Ives Gandra Martins (born 1935), Brazilian lawyer

== J ==
- Jack Martins (born 1967), American attorney and New York state senator
- Janício Martins (born 1979), Cape Verdean footballer
- Jean-Pierre Martins (born 1971), French actor and musician
- Jennifer Martins (born 1989), Canadian rower
- João Martins (footballer, born 1927) (1927–1993), Portuguese footballer
- João Martins (footballer, born 1982) (born 1982), Angolan footballer
- João Martins (footballer, born 1988) (born 1988), Portuguese footballer
- João Carlos Martins (born 1940), Brazilian pianist
- João Cleófas Martins (1901–1970), Cape Verdean photographer and humorist
- João Luís Martins (born 1967), Portuguese football coach and footballer
- Joaquim Martins, aerospace engineer
- Joaquim Pedro de Oliveira Martins (1845–1894), Portuguese writer
- Joel Antônio Martins (1931–2003), Brazilian footballer
- Johan Martins, Galician clergyman
- John Martins (boxer) (born 1950), Nigerian boxer
- Jorge Luiz Thais Martins (born 1954), Brazilian serial killer
- José Eduardo Martins (pianist) (born 1938), Brazilian concert pianist
- José Eduardo Martins (politician) (born 1969), Portuguese lawyer and politician
- José Freitas Martins (born 1951), Portuguese cyclist
- José Maria da Cruz Martins (born 1973), São Toméan football manager
- José Martins (footballer, born 1906) (1906–1994), Portuguese footballer
- José Martins (boxer) (born 1931), Brazilian boxer
- José Gouveia Martins (1930–2015), Portuguese footballer
- José Saraiva Martins (born 1932), Portuguese Cardinal of the Roman Catholic Church
- José Tomás de Sousa Martins (1843–1897), Portuguese doctor
- Josimar da Silva Martins (born 1984), Brazilian footballer
- Jovel Martins (born 1990), Indian footballer
- Juliana Martins (model) (born 1984), Brazilian model
- Juliana Martins (actress) (born 1974), Brazilian actress
- Juliano Pescarolo Martins (born 1974), Brazilian footballer
- Júlio César Martins (born 1978), Brazilian footballer
- Júlio César Oliveira Martins (born 1983), Brazilian footballer
- Júlio Oliveira Martins (born 1983), Brazilian footballer

== K ==
- Kaio Magno Bacelar Martins (born 1999), Brazilian footballer
- Kathleen Martins, American politician
- Kunle Martins (born 1980), American artist

== L ==
- Lasier Martins (born 1942), Brazilian politician and journalist
- Lauriela Martins (born 1998), Angolan model and beauty pageant titleholder
- Lavina Martins (born 1993), Kenyan badminton player
- Leandro Barreiro Martins (born 2000), Luxembourgish footballer
- Li Martins (born 1984), Brazilian singer
- Lima Duarte (born 1930), Brazilian actor
- Lorraine Martins (born 2000), Brazilian sprinter
- Lourenço Martins (born 1997), Portuguese volleyball player
- Lucas Martins (born 1988), Brazilian mixed martial artist
- Luciano Martins (born 1963), Brazilian footballer
- Luís Martins (footballer, born 1963) (born 1963), Portuguese football coach
- Luís Martins (footballer, born June 1992) (born 1992), Portuguese footballer
- Luís Martins (footballer, born October 1992) (born 1992), Portuguese footballer
- Luís Carlos Martins (born 1955), Brazilian football manager
- Luis Felipe Hungria Martins (born 2001), Brazilian footballer
- Luís Miguel Fontes Martins (born 1972), Portuguese footballer
- Luís Paixão Martins (born 1954), Portuguese communication and public relations consultant
- Luiz Martins (1914–1998), Brazilian sports shooter

== M ==
- Márcio Martins (born 1980), Brazilian footballer
- Manuel Martins (1911–1979), Brazilian artist
- Manuel António Martins (1772–1845), Portuguese businessman and colonial governor of Cape Verde and Portuguese Guinea
- Manuel da Silva Martins (1927–2017), Portuguese Catholic bishop
- Mariana Martins (born 1983), Brazilian judoka
- Marco Martins (born 1972), Portuguese Film and Theatre director
- Marco Martins (fencer) (born 1973), Brazilian fencer
- Margarida Martins (born 1953), Portuguese social activist and politician
- Maria Martins (athlete) (born 1974), French middle distance runner
- Maria Martins (artist) (1894–1973), Brazilian sculptor, designer, writer, painter, writer and musician
- Maria Martins (cyclist) (born 1999), Portuguese cyclist
- Mark S. Martins (born 1960), Brigadier General in the United States Army Judge Advocate General's Corps
- Mateus Cardoso Lemos Martins (born 2000), Brazilian footballer
- Mateus Gonçalves Martins (born 1994), Brazilian footballer
- Mide Martins, Nigerian actress
- Morgane Martins (born 1998), Portuguese footballer

== N ==
- Nathalia Pinheiro Felipe Martins (born 1990), Brazilian model and actress
- Nelia Martins (born 1998), East Timorese middle-distance runner
- Nicolas Martins (born 1999), Portuguese rugby union player
- Nilas Martins (born 1967), Danish ballet dancer

== O ==
- Obafemi Martins (born 1984), Nigerian footballer
- Oladipupo Martins (1983–2011), Nigerian footballer
- Olly Martins (born 1969), British politician
- Orlando Martins (1899–1985), Nigerian film and stage actor
- Ovídio Martins (1928–1999), Cape Verdean poet

== P ==
- Paulo Martins (footballer, born 1960), Brazilian footballer
- Paulo Martins (footballer, born 1991), Brazilian footballer
- Paulo Martins (wrestler) (born 1970), Portuguese wrestler
- Paulo Eduardo Martins (born 1981), Brazilian politician and journalist
- Paulo Egydio Martins (1928–2021), Brazilian politician
- Pedro Henrique Martins (born 1985), Brazilian footballer
- Pedro Martins (Portuguese footballer) (born 1970), Portuguese football manager and footballer
- Pedro Martins (badminton) (born 1990), Portuguese badminton player
- Pedro Martins (racewalker) (born 1968), Portuguese race walker
- Pedro Martins, Lord of the Tower of Vasconcelos (1160–?), Portuguese noble knight
- Peter Martins (born 1946), Danish New York City Ballet's balletmaster in chief
- Priscilla Martins (born 1990), Miss Earth Brazil 2013

== R ==
- Ramiro Martins (born 1941), Portuguese cyclist
- Raul Martins, Portuguese rugby union player and coach
- Raúl Martins (born 1987), Portuguese footballer
- Renê Rodrigues Martins (born 1992), Brazilian footballer
- Ricardo Martins (born 1990), Venezuelan footballer
- Robert Martins (1822–1904), British world checkers/draughts champion
- Robson José Brilhante Martins (born 1998), Brazilian footballer
- Rodinei Martins (born 1969), Brazilian footballer
- Rodrigo Martins (born 1998), Portuguese footballer
- Rogério Gonçalves Martins (born 1984), Brazilian footballer
- Ronald Pereira Martins (born 2001), Brazilian footballer
- Rui Cardoso Martins (born 1967), Portuguese writer

== S ==
- Sara Martins (born 1977), French-Portuguese actress
- Sébastien Martins (born 1985), French rugby league footballer
- Sidmar Antônio Martins (born 1962), Brazilian footballer
- Silvia Martins, Brazilian epidemiologist
- Steve Martins (born 1972), Canadian ice hockey player
- Sylvia Martins (born 1956), Brazilian painter

== T ==
- Talles Magno Bacelar Martins (born 2002), Brazilian footballer
- Tânia Martins (1957–2021), Brazilian poet
- Thiago Martins (born 1976), Brazilian footballer
- Theo Martins (born 1987), American actor and singer
- Tiago Luís Martins (born 1989), Brazilian footballer
- Tiago Martins (footballer, born 1987) (born 1987), Portuguese footballer
- Tiago Martins (footballer, born 1998) (born 1998), Portuguese footballer
- Tiago Martins (referee) (born 1980), Portuguese football referee
- Tommy Joe Martins (born 1986), American stock car racing driver

== V ==
- Valdemar Rodrigues Martins (Oreco) (1932–1985), Brazilian footballer
- Valdiléia Martins (born 1989), Brazilian athlete
- Vânia Cristina Martins (born 1980), Brazilian footballer
- Vasco Martins (1956–2025), Cape Verdean musician and composer
- Victor Martins (born 2001), French racing driver
- Vítor Martins (born 1944), Brazilian songwriter
- Vítor Martins (footballer) (born 1950), Portuguese footballer

== W ==
- Wagner da Conceicao Martins (born 1978), Brazilian mixed martial artist
- Wallace Martins (born 1983), Brazilian volleyball player
- Wellington Martins (born 1991), Brazilian footballer
- Wilson Martins (literary critic) (1921–2010), Brazilian literary critic
- Wilson Barbosa Martins (1917–2018), Brazilian politician
- Wilson Nunes Martins (born 1953), Brazilian politician

== Z ==
- Zeferino Martins (born 1985), East Timorese footballer
- Zita Martins (born 1979), Portuguese astrobiologist
