= Isabel Martin =

Isabel Martin(s) can refer to:

- Isabel Martín (born 1999), Spanish professional racing cyclist
- Isabel Martin (wheelchair basketball) (born 1999), Australian wheelchair basketball player
- Isabel Martin Lewis (1881–1966), American astronomer born Isabel Eleanor Martin
- Isabel Martins (fl. 1977), Mozambican politician
