= Luís Martins =

Luís Martins may refer to:

- Luís Martins (footballer, born 1963), Portuguese football manager
- Luís Martins (footballer, born June 1992), Portuguese footballer
- Luís Martins (footballer, born October 1992), Portuguese footballer
- Luís Carlos Martins (born 1955), Brazilian professional football manager
- Luís Paixão Martins (born 1954), Portuguese communication and public relations consultant
