= Paula Teixeira da Cruz =

Portuguese lawyer and politician

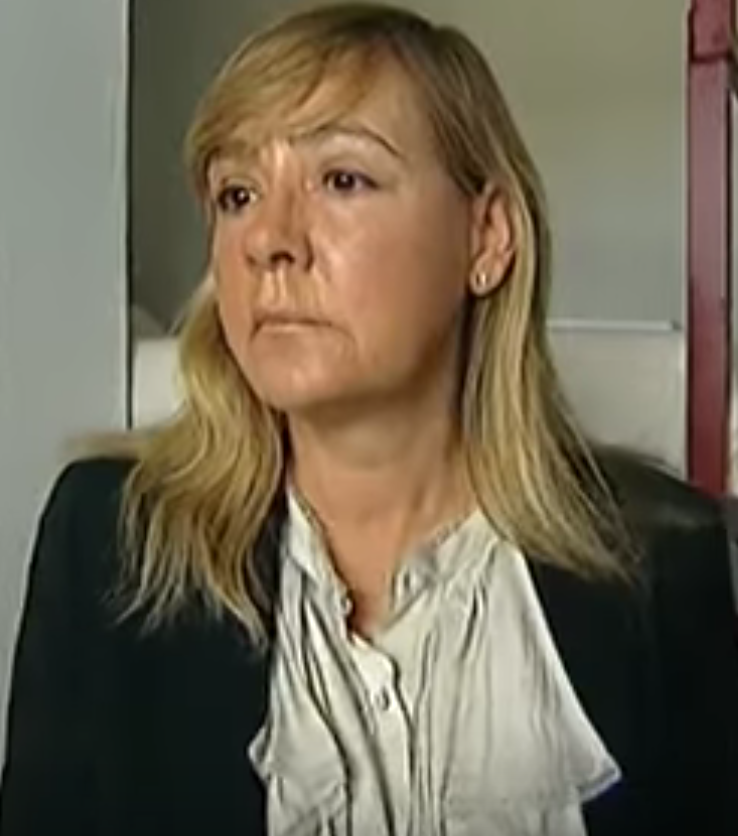
- Teixeira da Cruz in 2015

Minister of Justice
- In office 21 June 2011 – 30 October 2015
- Prime Minister: Pedro Passos Coelho
- Preceded by: Alberto Martins
- Succeeded by: Fernando Negrão

Member of the Assembly of the Republic
- In office 20 June 2011 – 24 October 2019
- Constituency: Lisbon

President of the Municipal Assembly of Lisbon
- In office 9 October 2005 – 11 October 2009
- Mayor: Carmona Rodrigues; António Costa
- Preceded by: António Modesto Navarro
- Succeeded by: Simonetta Luz Afonso

Member of the Lisbon City Council
- In office 1 January 1998 – 1 January 2002

Personal details
- Born: Paula Maria von Hafe Teixeira da Cruz; 1 June 1960 (age 66) Luanda, Portuguese Angola
- Party: Social Democratic Party (1995–present)
- Spouse: Paulo Teixeira Pinto (m. 1984; div. 2008)
- Children: 2
- Education: Universidade Livre de Lisboa
- Occupation: Lawyer • Politician

Paula Maria von Hafe Teixeira da Cruz (born 1 June 1960) is a Portuguese lawyer and politician. She served as Minister of Justice in the government led by Pedro Passos Coelho from 2011 to 2015.

== Early life ==
She was born in Luanda, Portuguese Angola in 1960. Her father was Augusto Teixeira da Cruz and her mother was Maria Susana Casanho von Hafe, whose father was a German.

Leaving Angola in 1975 due to the events of the Carnation Revolution (1974) she attended Liceu Padre António Vieira, in Lisbon, Portugal and graduated in law at the Universidade Livre de Lisboa in 1983. Until 1987, she taught at the same university, as well in the Faculdade de Direito da Universidade de Lisboa, as assistant of Administrative law. She ministered the same course at Instituto de Estudos Superiores Financeiros e Fiscais, between 1991 and 1992.

A lawyer since 1992, she had an office in Garrett Street, in Lisbon. In 2006 she joined F. Castelo Branco & Associados, where she coordinated the Department of Public, Administrative and Environmental Law. She's also arbiter at Centro de Mediação, Peritagens e Arbitragens Voluntárias do Conselho Nacional de Profissões Liberais. She was a member of Conselho Superior da Magistratura (Superior Council of Magistracy, 2003–2005), of General Council of the Portuguese Bar Association (2002–2005) and of Superior Council of the Public Ministry (1999–2003). She's a member of the Association for the Advancement of Law and the Abraço Association (association of support to people with HIV/AIDS) along with Paula Policarpo, José Amaral Lopes and Margarida Martins.

== Political career ==
Paula Teixeira da Cruz is a member of Social Democratic Party since 1995. She was as councilwoman in Lisbon (1998–2002) and President of the Municipal Assembly of Lisbon (2005–2009).

She is vice-president of the National Committee of the Social Democratic Party under the leadership of Pedro Passos Coelho, position she also held between 2005 and 2006, under the leadership of Luís Marques Mendes.

After 2011 elections she was appointed Minister of Justice in the new coalition government.

== Personal life ==
Paula Teixeira da Cruz is divorced since October 1, 2008, from the businessman and former CEO of Banco Comercial Português Paulo Teixeira Pinto, whom she married in 1984 and with whom she had a daughter, Catarina, born in 1984, and a son, Paulo Guilherme, born in 1986, who died on November 1, 2008.

She is a supporter of drug liberalization, same-sex marriage and same-sex adoption.
