= LPM Comunicação =

- Company type: Private
- Industry: Public Relations; Advertising; Digital Marketing; Marketing
- Founded: 1986
- Founder: Luís Paixão Martins
- Headquarters: Lisbon, Portugal
- Website: lpmcom.pt/en

LPM Comunicação is a Portuguese Public Relations and Communication Consultancy firm. It was founded in 1986 by Luís Paixão Martins, who introduced the concept of Communication Consultancy in Portugal. The firm has been leading the industry over the years.

== Activity ==
Under the firm's management are about 100 communication projects and more than 80 clients. Some of LPM clients are Coca-Cola Company, McDonald's, Nike Inc, Abbott Laboratories, Pfizer Consumer Healthcare, Banco Espírito Santo, ZON, Unicer, Futebol Clube do Porto, Lisbon Tourism Board, Unitel, Auchan.

It's an independent firm with Portuguese capital and based in Lisbon, that through the relocation of teams or partnerships with other PR Consultancy firms also operates internationally, particularly in Spain, France, Italy, United Kingdom, Germany, Switzerland, Belgium, Brazil, Angola, Mozambique and Cape Verde.

Its founder is Luís Paixão Martins and the managing director is Catarina Vasconcelos. In total, LPM has in its team 75 consultants, managers, press officers, designers, producers and Communication analysts. It is the largest employer in the Portuguese industry.

LPM is part of Flat Marketing, the Portuguese group in the Public Relations industry with the highest turnover – 10 million Euros, 6 million Euros fee income – which owns 25 percent of the national market share.

In 2013, The Holmes Report, a global publication for the PR market, selected LPM Comunicação for the group of the best Iberian PR Consultancy firms.
