= Joaquim Martins =

Aerospace engineer, academic, and author

Joaquim R. R. A. Martins
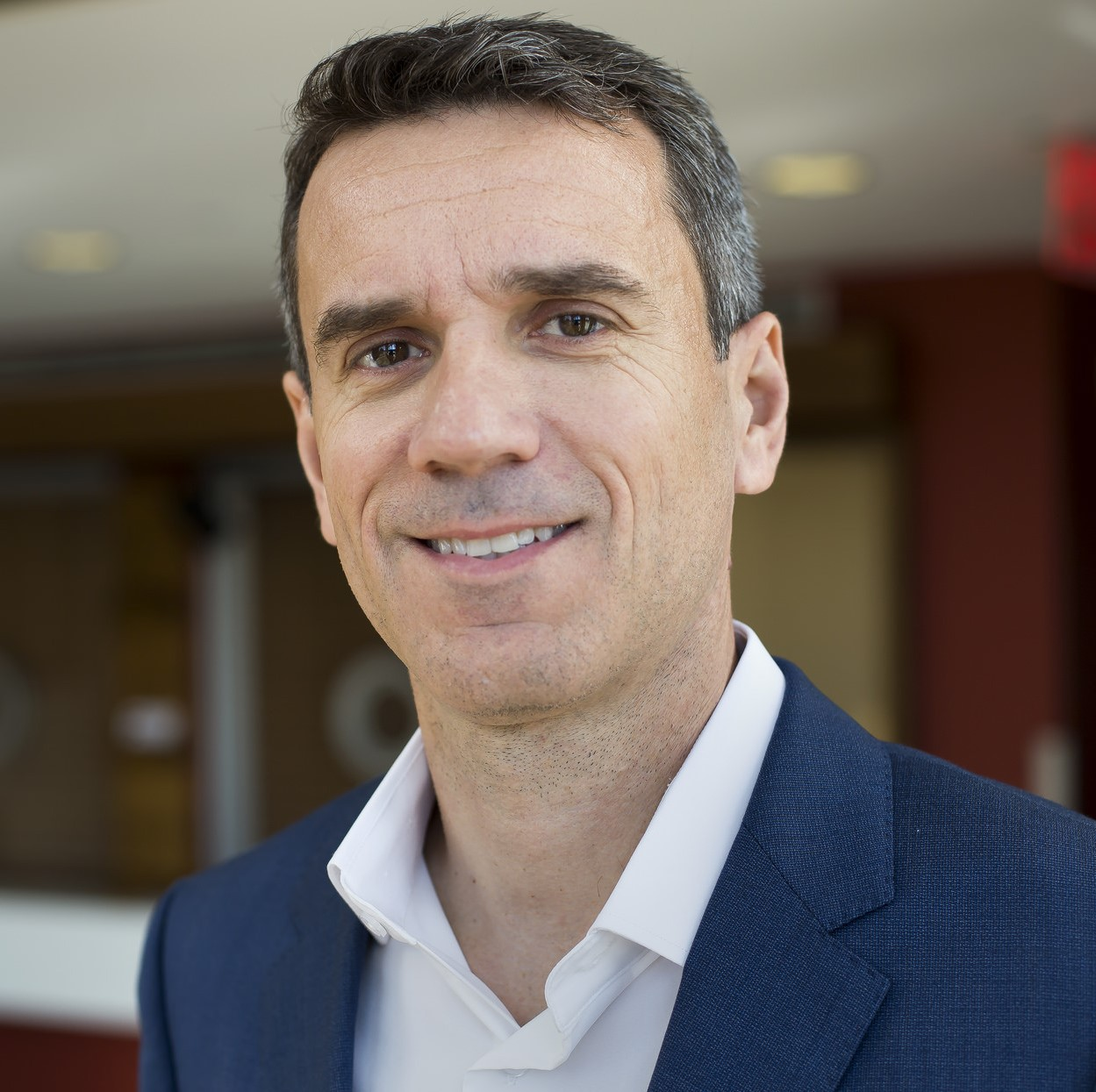
- Born: Porto, Portugal
- Occupations: Aerospace engineer, academic and author

Academic background
- Education: M.Eng. Aeronautics; M.Sc. Aeronautics and Astronautics; Ph.D. Aeronautics and Astronautics
- Alma mater: Stanford University; Imperial College London
- Thesis: A coupled-adjoint method for high-fidelity aero-structural optimization (2002)

Joaquim R. R. A. Martins is an aerospace engineer, academic, and author. He is the Pauline M. Sherman Collegiate Professor in the Department of Aerospace Engineering at the University of Michigan, where he directs the Multidisciplinary Design Optimization Laboratory (MDO Lab). He also has a courtesy appointment in the Department of Naval Architecture and Marine Engineering.

Martins is known for his research in methods for multidisciplinary design optimization (MDO) and its applications to the design of aircraft and other engineering systems. He is the author of the textbook Engineering Design Optimization.

Martins is a Fellow of the Royal Aeronautical Society and the American Institute of Aeronautics and Astronautics. He is the recipient of the Ballhaus Prize, the British Aerospace Award, and a Marie Skłodowska–Curie Fellowship. He has been a member of the AIAA Multidisciplinary Design Optimization Technical Committee. Additionally, he is a member of the International Organizing Committee for the Aircraft Structural Design Conference and AIAA Aerodynamic Design Optimization Discussion Group.

== Early life and education ==
Martins was born in Porto, Portugal, and grew up in the Azores, in the city of Horta. He earned his Master of Engineering in Aeronautics from Imperial College, London in 1995. Before moving to London, he completed one year at the University of Oslo. For his final Master of Engineering project, he was a Visiting Researcher at the Israel Institute of Technology. He then obtained a Master of Science in Aeronautics and Astronautics at Stanford University in 1997, where he became a Research Assistant and completed his Ph.D. in 2002.

== Career ==
Martins started his academic career at the University of Toronto Institute for Aerospace Studies, where he was an assistant professor from 2002 to 2008 and associate professor until 2009. Throughout his tenure at the University of Toronto, he held the Canada Research Chair in Multidisciplinary Design Optimization. He then took the role of associate professor in the Department of Aerospace Engineering at the University of Michigan, where he was promoted to Full Professor in 2015. He held a Visiting Professorship at the ISAE–SUPAERO Institut Supérieur de l'Aéronautique et de l'Espace in Toulouse from 2015 to 2016, where he was a Marie Skłodowska–Curie Fellow. Since 2021, he has been the Pauline M. Sherman Collegiate Professor in the Department of Aerospace Engineering at the University of Michigan, concurrently holding a courtesy appointment as a professor in the Department of Naval Architecture and Marine Engineering.

In 2016, Martins founded Supercritical Research LLC (restructured as Supercritical Inc. in 2025), a company that applies multidisciplinary design optimization methods from his research group to industrial aerospace applications.

Martins was the Technical Co-chair for the 12th AIAA/ISSMO Multidisciplinary Analysis and Optimization Conference in 2008. He was a co-organizer for the Fields Industrial Optimization Seminars and NSF Workshop titled "The Future of Multidisciplinary Design Optimization: Advancing the Design of Complex Systems". Moreover, he co-organized the UTIAS–MITACS International Workshop on Aviation and Climate Change in Toronto.

== Research ==
Martins' studies have contributed to the understanding of the architectures and practical applications of MDO. He, with Andrew B. Lambe, introduced the extended design structure matrix to show data dependencies and process flows in MDO. They also described and classified MDO architectures based on problem formulation, discussing their benefits and drawbacks from both theoretical and practical perspectives.

Martins developed methodologies and software for aerodynamic shape optimization based on computational fluid dynamics (CFD) for aircraft design as well as other applications, including the shape optimization of cars, wind turbines, and hydrofoils. He addressed the absence of a standard benchmark problem in aerodynamic shape optimization by tackling problems based on the Common Research Model wing.

Martins is best known for pioneering high-fidelity MDO where CFD is coupled to structural finite-element analysis, propulsion thermal cycle analysis, and conjugate heat transfer. The key contribution of his work is the coupled-adjoint method, which computes derivatives of coupled systems efficiently to inform gradient-based optimization algorithms such as SNOPT. Applications have included the aerostructural optimization of airliner wings, wind turbine blades, and hydrofoils.

In collaboration with his students and NASA Glenn Research Center, Martins generalized the coupled-adjoint method and implemented it in OpenMDAO framework. Much of the theory behind OpenMDAO is explained in his book, Engineering Design Optimization.

Martins has also co-developed the Python optimization interface pyOptSparse, the surrogate modeling toolbox (SMT), and the high-fidelity multiphysics MDO framework MPhys.

== Awards and honors ==
- 1995 – British Aerospace Award, Imperial College London
- 2002 – Best Paper Award, AIAA/ISSMO Symposium on Multidisciplinary Analysis and Optimization
- 2003 – Ballhaus Prize for Best Thesis, Stanford University
- 2006 – Best Paper Award, AIAA/ISSMO Multidisciplinary Analysis and Optimization Conference
- 2012 – Best Paper Award, AIAA/ISSMO Multidisciplinary Analysis and Optimization Conference
- 2014 – Best Paper Award, AIAA/ISSMO Multidisciplinary Analysis and Optimization Conference
- 2015 – Marie Skłodowska–Curie Fellowship
- 2019 – Best Paper Award in Applied Aerodynamics, AIAA SciTech Forum
- 2019 – Fellow, Royal Aeronautical Society
- 2020 – Fellow, American Institute of Aeronautics and Astronautics
- 2023 – Best Paper in Multidisciplinary Design Optimization, AIAA Aviation and Aeronautics Forum and Exposition

== Bibliography ==
=== Books ===
- Martins, Joaquim R. R. A.; Ning, Andrew (2022). Engineering Design Optimization. Cambridge: Cambridge University Press. ISBN 978-1-108-83341-7.

=== Selected articles ===
- Martins, J. R. R. A., Sturdza, P., and Alonso, J. J. (2003). The complex-step derivative approximation. ACM Transactions on Mathematical Software (TOMS), 29(3), 245–262. doi: 10.1145/838250.838251
- Martins, J. R. R. A., and Lambe, A. B. (2013). Multidisciplinary design optimization: a survey of architectures. AIAA journal, 51(9), 2049–2075. doi: 10.2514/1.J051895
- Gray, J. S., Hwang, J. T., Martins, J. R. R. A., Moore, K. T., and Naylor, B. A. (2019). OpenMDAO: An open-source framework for multidisciplinary design, analysis, and optimization. Structural and Multidisciplinary Optimization, 59, 1075–1104. doi: 10.1007/s00158-019-02211-z
- Brelje, B. J., & Martins, J. R. R. A. (2019). Electric, hybrid, and turboelectric fixed-wing aircraft: A review of concepts, models, and design approaches. Progress in Aerospace Sciences, 104, 1–19. doi: 10.1016/j.paerosci.2018.06.004
- Martins, J. R. (2022). Aerodynamic design optimization: Challenges and perspectives. Computers & Fluids, 239, 105391. doi: 10.1016/j.compfluid.2022.105391
- Adler, E. J., & Martins, J. R. (2023). Hydrogen-powered aircraft: fundamental concepts, key technologies, and environmental impacts. Progress in Aerospace Sciences, 141, 100922. doi: 10.1016/j.paerosci.2023.100922
