= NewsMuseum =

Coordinates: 38°47′47″N 9°23′24″W

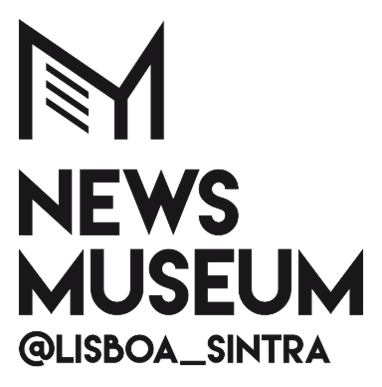
- Established: 2016; 10 years ago
- Location: Sintra, Portugal
- Type: News and Media Museum
- Visitors: 80.000 (expected)
- President: Luís Paixão Martins
- Owner: Acta Diurna

The NewsMuseum is a museum dedicated to news, media and communication located in Sintra, Portugal. Inspired by the Washington’s Newseum (USA), it was inaugurated in the first minutes of 25 April 2016, in an event attended by the President of the Portuguese Republic, Marcelo Rebelo de Sousa.

It occupies the former facilities of the Museu do Brinquedo (Toy Museum) and presents a history of the media and journalism evolution.

The Acta Diurna association, which promotes the project and is presided by Luís Paixão Martins, has invested approximately 1.8 million euros in the museum. The project also has the support of Sintra’s city council, which lent the property in the center to the association, for 20 years.

== Features ==
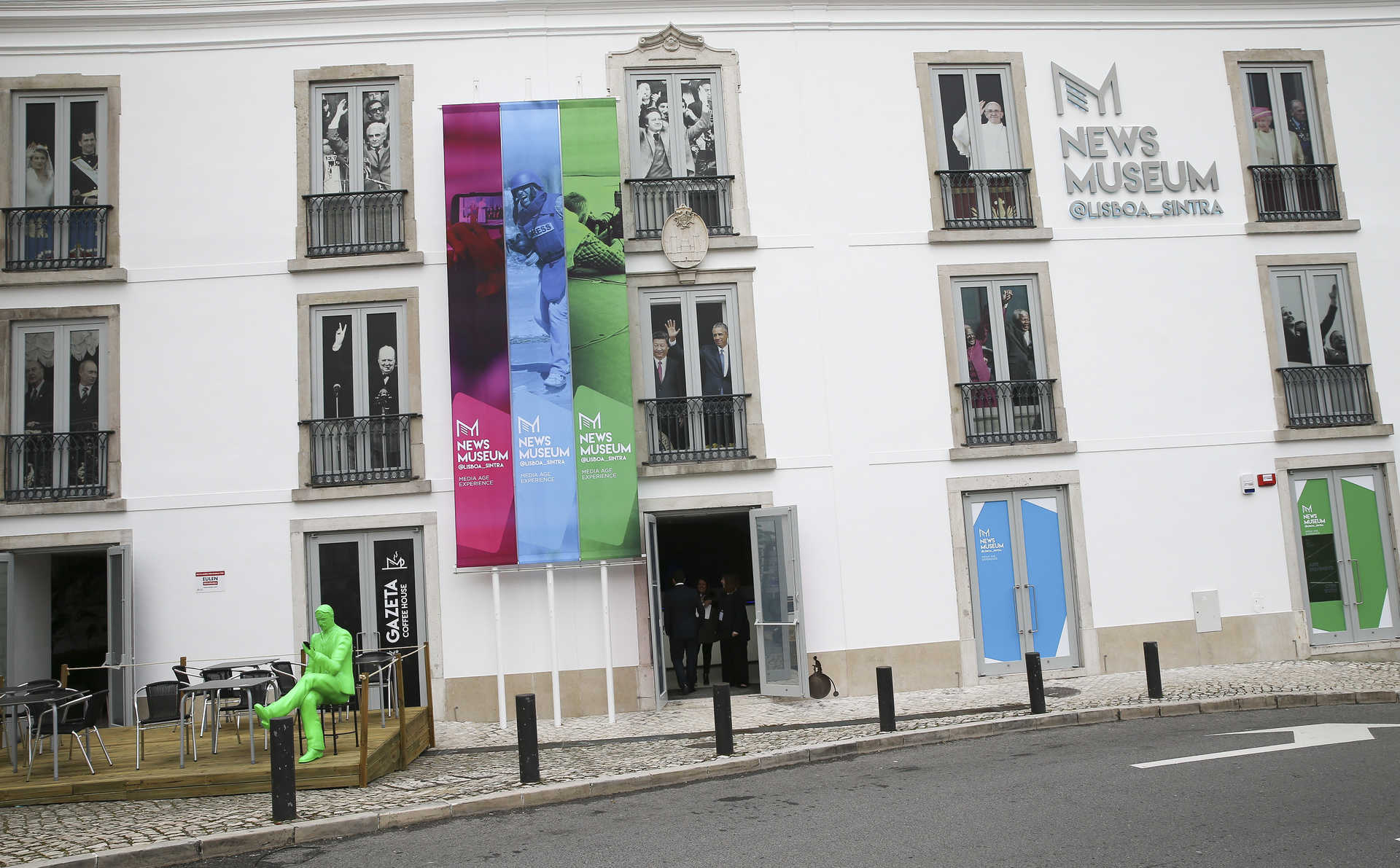
NewsMuseum

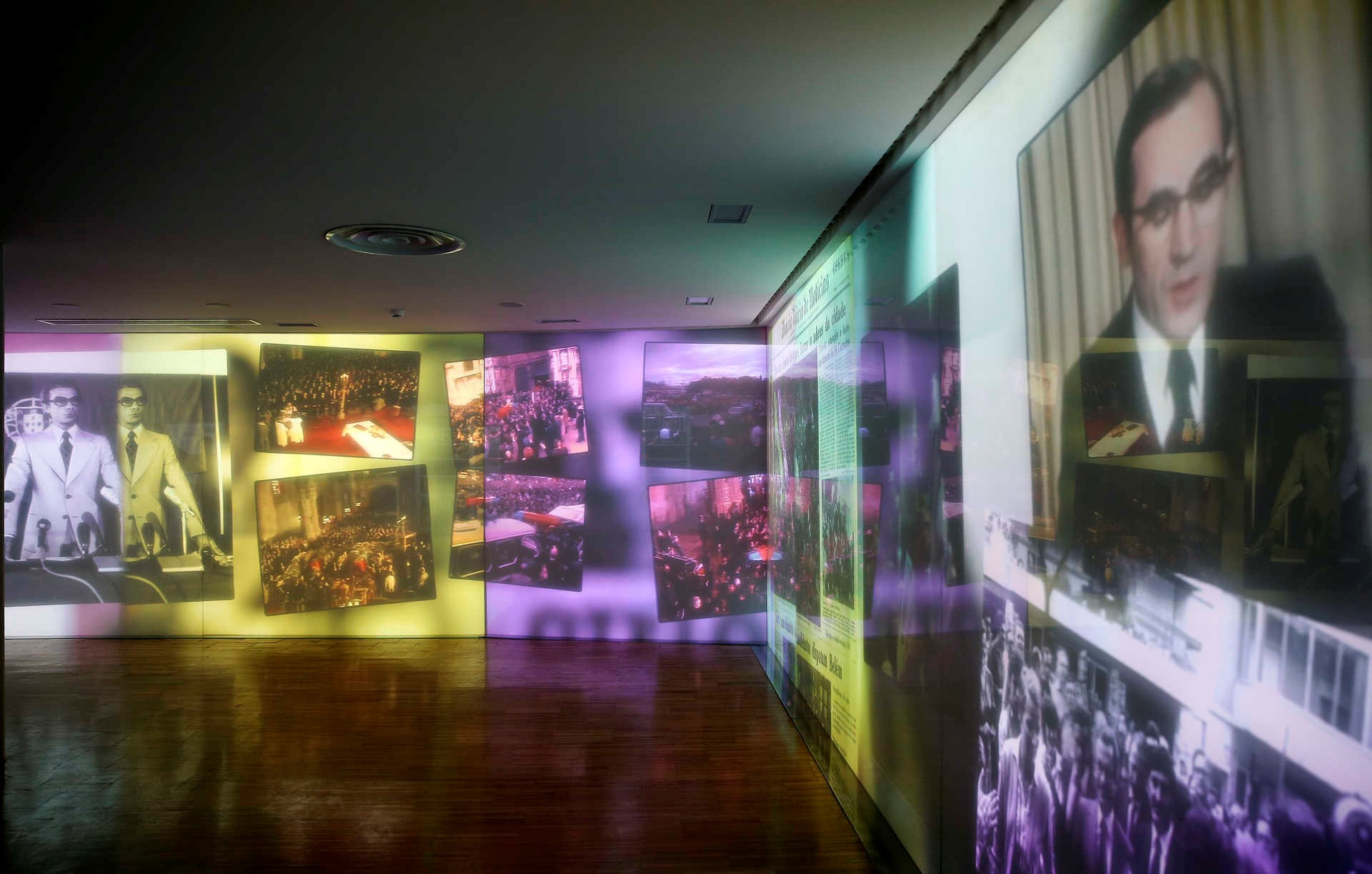
360º vision at the Lounge

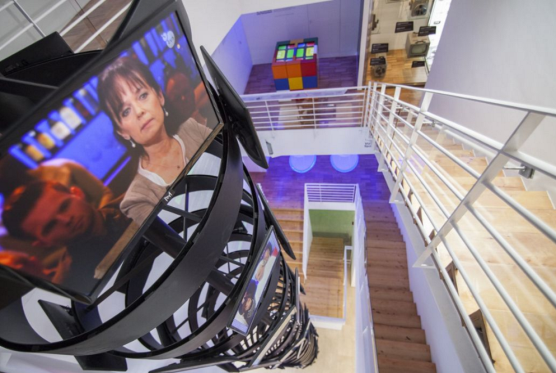
The "Pyramid of Babel" tv screens

The experience begins outside, where visitors can find a statue of the journalist and writer Eça de Queiroz, staring at his smartphone.

In more than 25 thematic areas, spread across the building´s three floors, episodes of the history of Portugal and the World are remembered through their media coverage.

There are more than 300 consultation articles and a total of 16 hours of information/entertainment and multimedia, always in an interactive approach that allows the visitor not only to see, but also to take part in the stories.

NewsMuseum aims to be a Media Age Experience, an open window into the world of media and communication, and their impact on society, using a strong digital and technological component.

All of the content is available in Portuguese and English, making the project truly bilingual.

== Thematic areas ==
The Lounge, one of NewsMuseum's rooms, tells stories through a touch screen of 67m^{2}and features a 360° view for an innovative experience while watching vídeos.

The War Journalism's area, curated by the journalist José Rodrigues dos Santos, recreates the balcony where reporters covered the first night of the Gulf War, and reviews the close connection of different media with the most significant conflicts in contemporary world history.

In the room dedicated to Duels, visitors can remember great media duels, in an area about the rivalries that the media portrayed, such as the famous debate between Mário Soares and Álvaro Cunhal after the Hot Summer of 1975.

In the thematic area regarding Propaganda, it is possible to remember the most emblematic propagandists, including António Ferro, and the critics of this communication tool. Visitors can also see iconic political posters and even post some of them on the NewsMuseum wall.

In the Sports room, the highlight goes to the media careers of Eusébio and Cristiano Ronaldo, as well as for the exhibition "8 Best of: Best Sports Moments", dedicated to great Portuguese sports moments, like Eder's goal at Euro 2016, Rosa Mota and Carlos Lopes's victories at the 1988 and 1984 Olympic Games or Rui Costa's 2013 World Cycling Champion title. The choice resulted from an online vote conducted by the Portuguese newspaper Record, partner in the project, and the opening of the exhibition on 19 November 2019, was attended by Portugal’s Minister of Education, Tiago Brandão Rodrigues.

The thematic area dedicated to the Radio allows visitors to enter a radio booth and read a MFA [military movement] statement on the microphone, reproducing the atmosphere lived in the early hours of April 25, 1974.

Through the "Pyramid of Babel", a metallic tower with 69 television screens, one can watch the main news channels from around the globe. News from national and international media are projected in real time on one of the walls.

An interactive globe allows NewsMuseum visitors to discover the press freedom index throughout the world.

Some of the most notable personalities of the Portuguese journalism are remembered through multimedia content, in a thematic area that includes testimonials from various professionals in the field.

There are also areas dedicated to photojournalism, "bad news", marketing and public relations. As well as an "objects from the past" exhibit: 1950s camcorders, professional record players, telexes, and replicas of clothes worn by newscasters, provided by RTP, LUSA, and EFE.

Along the three floors there are several Fun Zones, including a Rubik's cube where visitors can make the front page of a newspaper, according to their answers on questions about journalistic ethics. Manuela Moura Guedes tests the visitors’ media culture, in a contest about the world of communication. NewsMuseum also proposes a journey to the future through virtual reality glasses, an 8-minute experience that transports the visitor through current and future journalism.

The media experience extends to all NewsMuseum spaces, including the elevator, where visitors can hear, among others, the speech of Robot Sofia, in which she communicates the attribution of her nationality to Saudi Arabia. Also the "most famous journalists on the planet" - Tintin and Clark Kent (Superman) - compose a panel with illustrations and vídeos.

== Temporary exhibitions ==
On 25 April 2017, NewsMuseum inaugurated the exhibition "Macho Media", an interactive multimedia show around the main milestones and media episodes of the fight against machismo and female emancipation.

== Education services ==
The museum also has a small auditorium and a space for "live" television broadcasts, areas dedicated to schools, with the aim of making media literacy among the younger ones. The visit also includes a short "class" with one of the curators, such as Manuel Falcão, José Rodrigues dos Santos and Paula Cordeiro, on a previously selected theme, such as War Journalism, Social Networks, The Radio, The Future of the Media, Towards Danger (September 11 Documentary), The Digital World: Wikileaks, The Berlin Wall and the Press.

== NewsMuseum Library ==
NewsMuseum also promotes the NewsMuseum Library, an initiative with the support of Chiado Editora, that gathers books related to journalism, media and communication.

On 15 October 2015, the first two books of the NewsMuseum Library were presented at Escola Superior de Comunicação Social, in Lisbon: Novo Dicionário da Comunicação, an encyclopaedia of several generations of journalism and media terms, as well as Tinha tudo para correr mal, Luís Paixão Martins professional memoirs.
