= Bernarda Gonçalves Martins =

Angolan politician

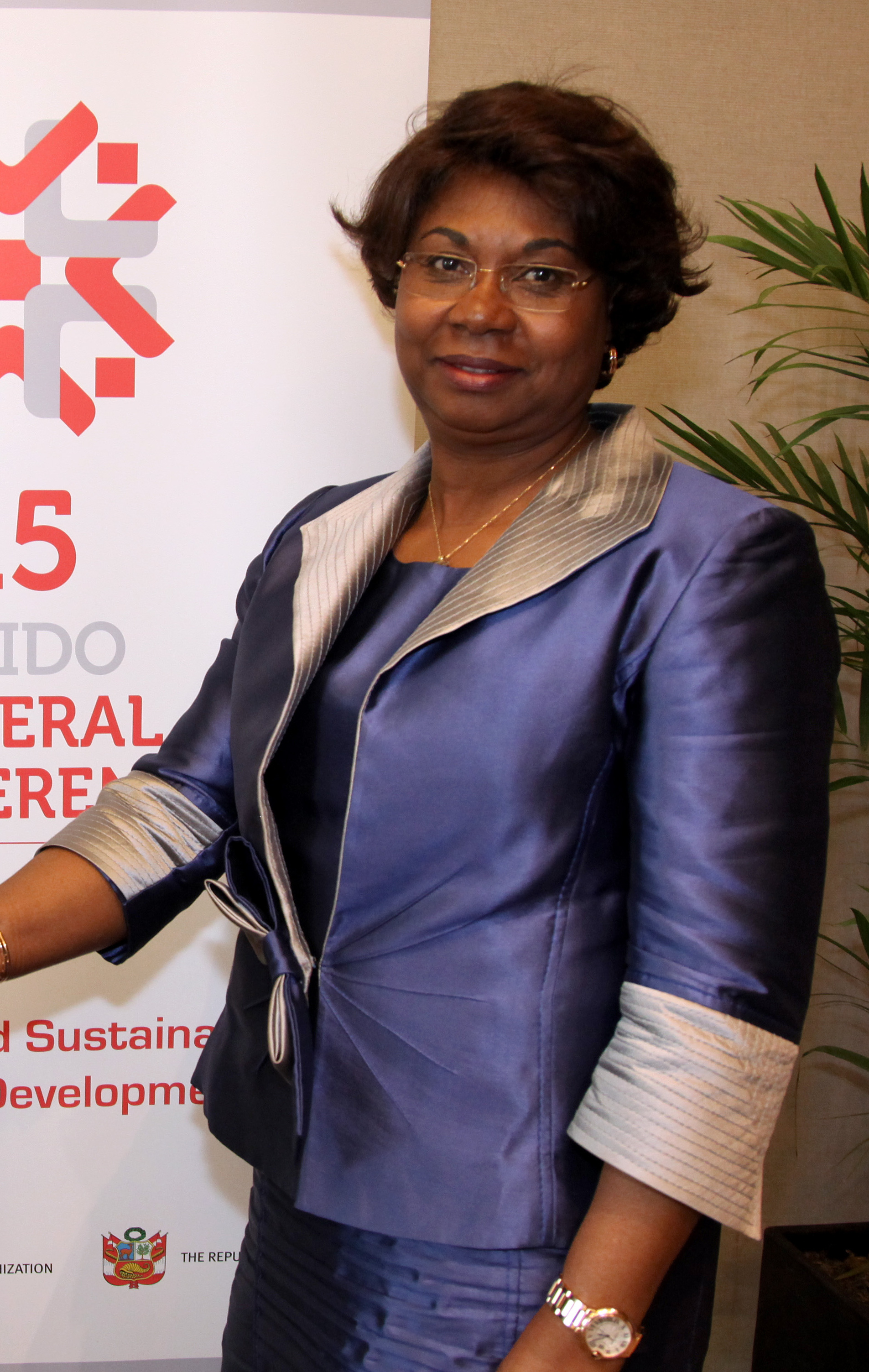
- Born: Angola
- Occupation: Politician

Bernarda Gonçalves Martins is an Angolan politician. She is the current Minister of Industry of Angola, as well as a member of parliament. She is a member of MPLA.
