= Pauline Sherman =

American aerospace engineer and academic

Pauline Mont Sherman
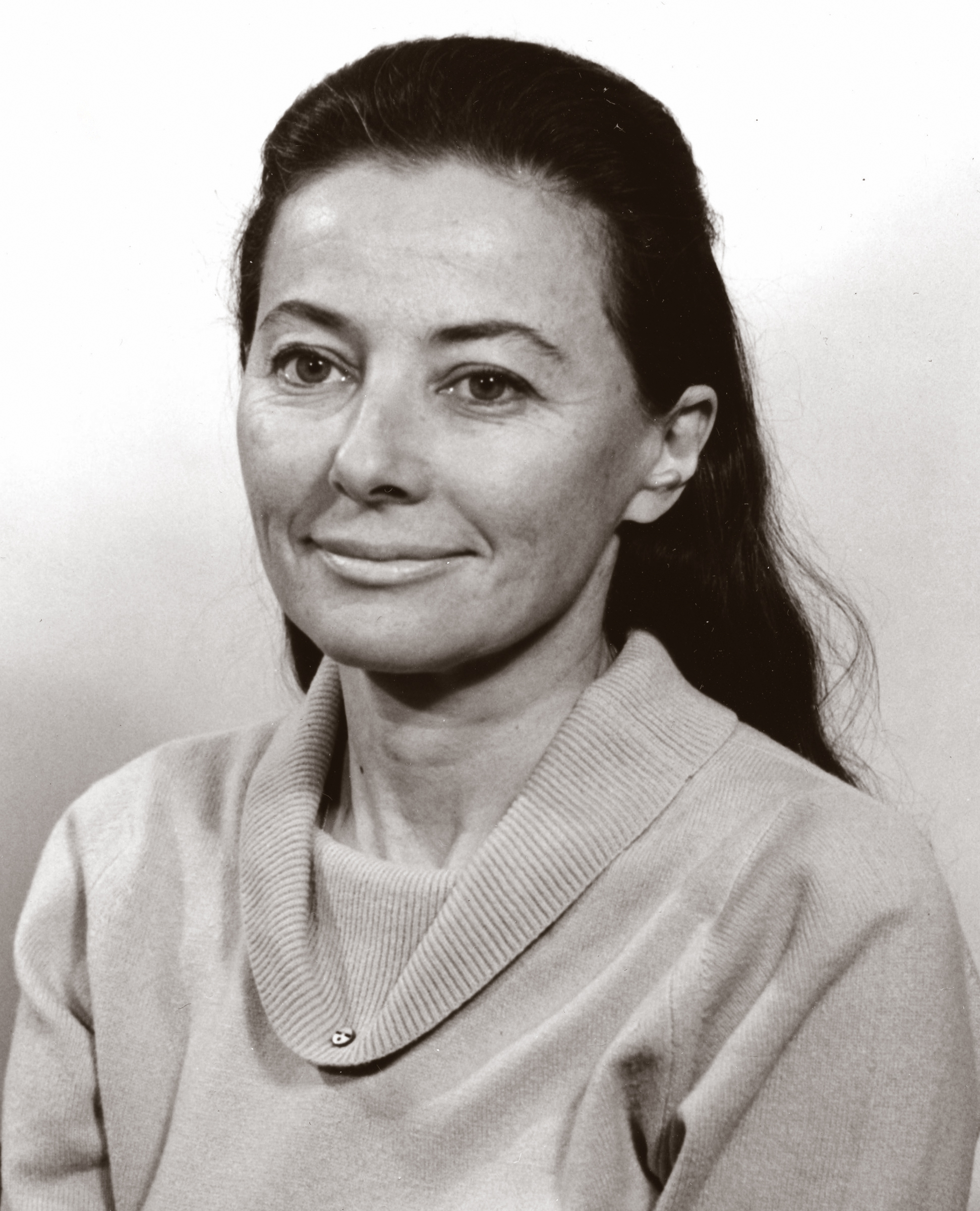
- Pauline Sherman
- Born: August 27, 1921; New York City, New York
- Died: August 17, 2007 (aged 85); Berkeley, California
- Occupations: Aerospace engineer and academic

Academic background
- Education: BS., Engineering Mechanics; MS., Mechanical Engineering
- Alma mater: University of Michigan; University of California, Berkeley

Academic work
- Institutions: University of California, Berkeley; University of Michigan

Pauline Mont Sherman was an American aerospace engineer and academic. She was the first female Professor in the College of Engineering at the University of Michigan and also the first woman to become Professor of Aerospace Engineering at the University of Michigan. Her research focuses on jet noise, low-density flows, two-phase flows, and especially hypersonic flows.

== Early life and education ==
Sherman was born in New York in 1921 to Polish immigrants. In 1942, she began working as an Expediter and Clerk for Eugene Scherman and later joined Babcock and Wilcox as a Contract Engineer in 1950. She earned a bachelor of science degree in Engineering Mechanics from the University of Michigan in 1952, where she participated in research on aircraft icing. At that time, pursuing an engineering degree was considered unconventional for women, as they were barred from City College liberal arts classes. In 1953, she went on to receive a master's degree in Mechanical Engineering from the University of California, Berkeley, where she concurrently served as a Research Engineer.

== Career ==
Sherman began her academic career by returning to the University of Michigan as an Associate Research Engineer in 1956. She assumed the position of Assistant Professor of Aerospace Engineering in 1960, becoming the first woman appointed to the engineering faculty, and was subsequently promoted to the role of Associate Professor in 1963 and later to full Professor in 1971, from which she retired in 1987. The University of Michigan created the Pauline M. Sherman Collegiate Professorship to honor her legacy.

Sherman joined Sigma XI in 1955 and worked as a Consultant for the Advisory Group for Aerospace Research (AGARD) and Development of NATO in 1962. She also provided consultancy services for the Environmental Protection Agency and the Lawrence Berkeley National Laboratory and advocated for women in science. Following her retirement in 1987, she became a volunteer for the American Civil Liberties Union.

== Research ==
Sherman has contributed to the field of aerospace engineering with her research focused on hypersonic flows, jet noise, electrical circuitry, two-phase flows and low-density flows. During the early 1960s, she held a supervisory role in overseeing the construction of a high-energy hypersonic wind tunnel. She highlighted its capability to provide high temperatures and pressures for extended periods, crucial for analyzing chemical non-equilibrium in nozzle expansion. She also proposed a design for a timed externally triggered quick exhaust valve, employing a double diaphragm system.

=== Hypersonic flows ===
Sherman researched hypersonic flows throughout her career. She demonstrated that the diameter of a Pitot tube affects the measurement of Pitot pressure, with calculations and measurements revealing variations in pressure depending on tube size, particularly showcasing a decrease in pressure for smaller tube diameters, suggesting potential solutions for reducing transducer lag time. She also showed that pressures on 3° cones matched findings for 5° cones, both showing correlation with the viscous interaction parameter, and a newly proposed calculation method closely aligned with measured pressures.

Working alongside L. Talbot and T. Koga, Sherman examined the condensation of zinc vapor in a helium carrier gas through nozzle acceleration, with particle size measurements revealing most particles were under 70 A in diameter, and pressure measurements indicating significant supercooling at Mach 3.

=== Two-phase flows ===
Another prominent focus in her research was the investigation of two-phase flows and low-density flows. In a large supersonic nozzle, she found that particle sizes ranged from 200 to 700 Å, correlating with initial vapor pressure, and that particle numbers decreased with increased mass fraction, while static pressure showed a linear increase with initial mass fraction. Additionally, she examined the condensation of superheated zinc vapor in an inert carrier gas, and observed an onset of condensation with approximately 430 K of supercooling and compared the findings with a classical liquid drop model of nucleation, which showed reasonable agreement with the measurements.

In a collaborative study, Sherman developed a dispenser that consistently feeds small particles into a laboratory burner using positive displacement and a sonic ejector, meeting the criteria for accurate chemical measurements and laser-Doppler anemometry. She also designed and implemented a low inductance circuit for evaporating metal wires and condensing metal vapor into submicron-sized spherical particles with a log normal distribution, showing a decreasing mean diameter as expansion length increased, while the impact of ambient gas type on particle size was limited in the absence of chemical reactions.

=== Jet noise ===
Focusing on jet noise, Sherman revealed that the jet's oscillation frequency matched the dominant sound frequency with a reflecting surface, while an insulated surface shifted sound frequencies above the audible range, and screech frequency was inversely related to the first shock cell length and decreased with higher stagnation pressure.

=== Electrical circuitry ===
In her work on electrical circuitry, Sherman presented an empirical method for predicting the parameters required to achieve a single pulse discharge with no oscillation or residual energy, utilizing an LRC circuit with a 14.7-μF capacitor charged to different voltages and discharging through various metal wires.

== Selected articles ==
- Talbot, L., Koga, T., & Sherman, P. M. (1959). Hypersonic viscous flow over slender cones. Journal of the Aerospace Sciences, 26(11), 723–730.
- Griffin, J. L., & Sherman, P. M. (1965). Computer analysis of condensation in highly expanded flows. AIAA Journal, 3(10), 1813–1818.
- McBride, D. D., & Sherman, P. M. (1972). Condensed zinc particle size determined by a time discrete sampling apparatus. AIAA Journal, 10(8), 1058–1063.
- Sherman, P. M. (1975). Generation of submicron metal particles. Journal of Colloid and Interface Science, 51(1), 87–93.
- Sherman, P. M., Glass, D. R., & Duleep, K. G. (1976). Jet flow field during screech. Applied Scientific Research, 32, 283–303.
