= Fred Martins =

Nigerian artist (b. 1988)

- Ekele
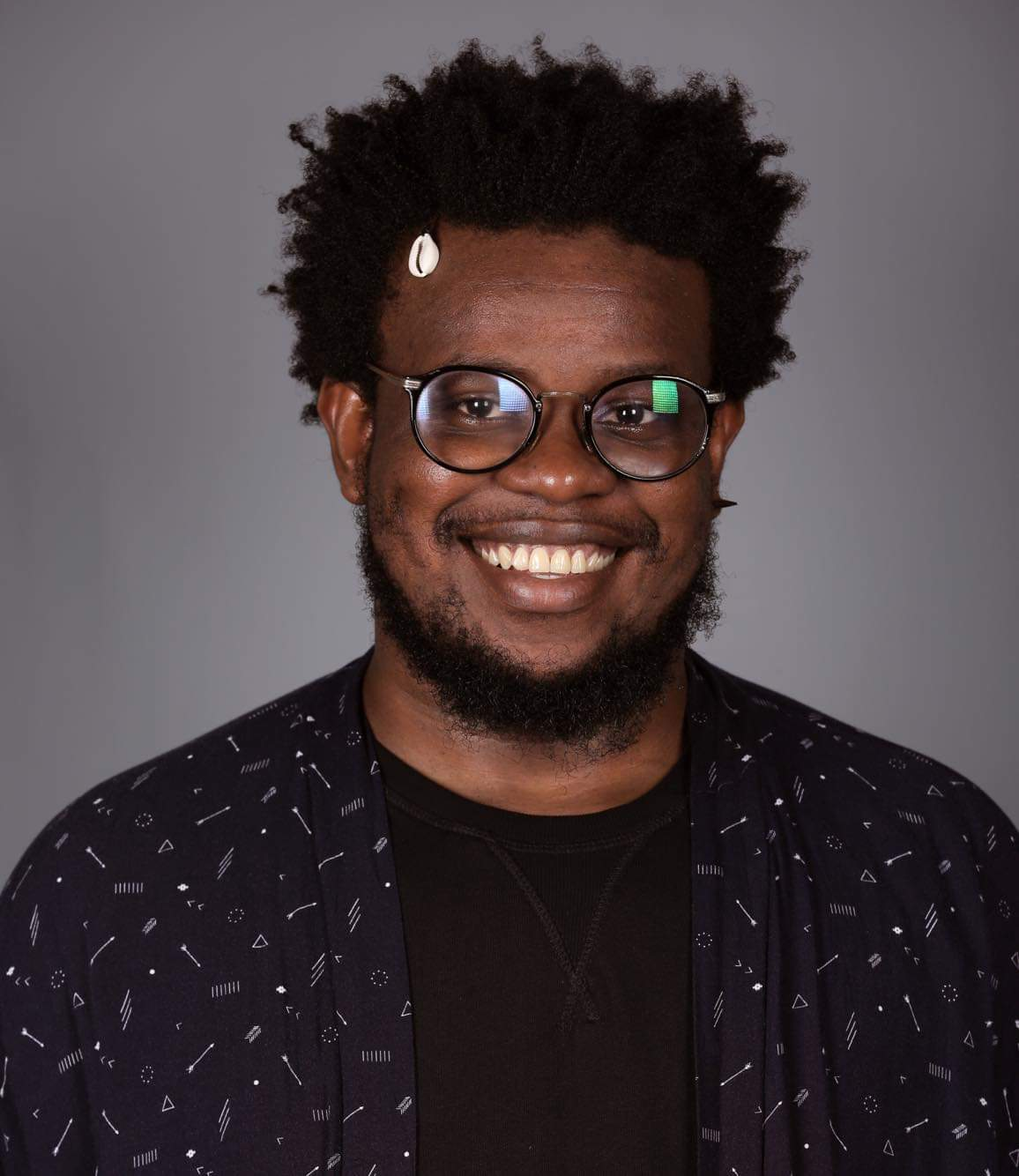
- Martins on set
- Born: September 15, 1988 (age 37); Aggah-Egbema, Rivers State, Nigeria
- Education: Crimean State Medical University, Danylo Halytsky Lviv National Medical University
- Occupations: Artist, art director
- Known for: Afro comb
- Notable work: 'Orange, Black and Freedom','Lee Nu Echi'.

Fred Ekele Martins (born on 15 September 1988) is a Nigerian artist, visual artist, medical doctor, photographer and artistic director. He was born and named Ekele Martins in Aggah-Egbema, Rivers State, Nigeria where he had his primary education before He moved to Simferopol, Ukraine to study medicine in 2010 at the Crimean State Medical University. In 2014, after the Russian annexation of the Crimean peninsula, he moved to Ukrainian mainland of Lviv where he completed the degree program at Danylo Halytsky Lviv National Medical University, Lviv as a medical doctor.

Fred Martins uses Afro combs to depicts all the suffering and frustrations pro African activists faced and also as a symbol to celebrate African heroes. Fred portrays the life of Martin Luther King Jr., Marcus Garvey, Nelson Mandela, Patrice Lumumba and Fela Kuti by using Afro combs. In his images, Fred uses the orange background that depicts the prisoners and jail, like the prisoners uniform and His image backgrounds are orange and this shows the hard experience of all the past activists and their suffering in jail.

Fred martins notable works include; 'Orange, Black and Freedom' which is an art series created from the maps of African countries as butterflies pointing out the locations where people suffered genocide as a result of colonialism. Other works of Fred martins include 'Lee Nu Echi', which showcases African children and their struggles with Child Soldier, Child Lynching, Child Marriage, Child Labour among others.

== Early life and education ==
Fred Martins is a Nigerian born self taught artist. Fred Martins was born on 15 September 1988, with name Ekele Martins in Aggah-Egbema Rivers State, Nigeria where he had his primary education. He moved to Simferopol, Ukraine to study medicine in 2010 at the Crimean State Medical University. In 2014, after the Russian annexation of the Crimean peninsula, he moved to Ukrainian mainland of Lviv where he completed the degree program at Danylo Halytsky Lviv National Medical University, Lviv as a medical doctor. By occupation, he is an artist, and an art director.

== Art and career ==
Soon after completing his degree as a Medical Doctor, Fred Martins worked with Onyeka Nwelue's Blues & Hills consultancy as an Art Director to host the Diplomatic Jazz Nights and art festivals at differentDiplomatic missions in Nigeria to promote different cultures.

== Artistic style ==
As an artist, Fred Martins has created numerous campaign posters on social issues which are emotionally charged and investigates into the struggles of the people that have been brushed aside. He created 'Global warming ' an art series that showcased troubled wildlife to protest climate change, and was published by the United Nations 2015 Global Goals For Sustainable Society. When Fred began his painting artwork, his artworks reveals what he feels raising his voice against cruelty and inequality while he adapted his own technique by showing his great effort on Afro combs. Fred Martins uses Afro combs to depicts all the suffering and frustrations pro African activists faced and also as a symbol to celebrate African heroes. Like the structure of a comb, the hearts of Africans have torn apart and broken into pieces and just like a comb, Africa want to get free from the bounds and hatred. Fred portrays the life of Martin Luther King Jr., Marcus Garvey, Nelson Mandela, Patrice Lumumba and Fela Kuti by using Afro combs. In his images, Fred uses the orange background that depicts the prisoners and jail, like the prisoners uniform. His images' backgrounds are orange and this shows the hard experience of all the past activists and their suffering in jail.

== Notable works ==
Fred martins notable works include; 'Orange, Black and Freedom'. It is an art series created from the maps of African countries as butterflies pointing out the locations where people suffered genocide as a result of colonialism. Other works of Fred martins include 'Lee Nu Echi', it showcases African children and their struggles with Child Soldier, Child Lynching, Child Marriage, Child Labour and among others. In 2021, Fred Martins had an invitation from Boddhi Satva (Father of Ancestral Soul Music Genre) to open his latest album 'Manifestation' alongside Brazilian Percussionist and Grammy Awards winner Jorge Bezerra. Fred's song, which was sung in Igbo language, serves as an intro to the entire album.

== Campaign and exhibitions ==
After releasing his work on "Orange, Black And Freedom". Fred Martins started a campaign within the West African states on Afro-Artivism which was centred on teaching the young creative Africans on how to use art to educate and bring positive change in their society. Many of his works have been exhibited in Orlando, Florida; Accra, Ghana; Switzerland; and Cape Town, South Africa.

== Current project ==
Fred Martins has been working on a photo book of masquerades for 5 years, called 'Memoir: Of gods, masquerades and men', a photo book and stories of events that led to his mother's incarceration while she was 32 weeks pregnant in the early 1980s for protesting against the activities of the West African masquerades against women.
