= Silvia Martins =

Brazilian epidemiologist and academic

Silvia Saboia Martins
- Born: Brazil
- Education: University of São Paulo; Federal University of Paraná
- Scientific career
- Workplaces: Columbia University; Johns Hopkins University; Columbia University Mailman School of Public Health

Silvia Saboia Martins is a Brazilian epidemiologist and the director of the Substance Use Epidemiology Unit of the Department of Epidemiology, Columbia University Mailman School of Public Health. Her research considers the epidemiology of substances abuse and origins of high opioid prescribing. She has won numerous awards for her mentoring, including the Irving Medical Center Mentor of the Year.

== Early life and education ==
Martins earned her medical degree at the Federal University of Paraná. She moved to the University of São Paulo for her psychiatry residency and doctoral studies, where she was awarded a São Paulo Research Foundation predoctoral fellowship. She was a postdoctoral fellow at Johns Hopkins University, where she was appointed to the faculty in 2005. Here she studied the prevalence of gambling among young people, and found that around 15% of African-American inner-city young people had some form of problem gambling.

== Research and career ==
In 2012 Martins joined Columbia University. Her research focuses on the epidemiology of substance use. She has studied the impact of medical and recreational cannabis laws in the United States. Her focus extends to exploring the combined effects of opioid and cannabis policies on mitigating opioid-related harm outcomes in the country. She also studies the trends in drug overdoses in Latin America. She has analysed the implications of opioid and substance use policies specifically designed for pregnant and postpartum women who are opioid users in the U.S. She found that during 2020 overdoses played a role in one in six pregnancy-associated deaths.

She has studied the typology of prescription drug monitoring programs, and how it impacts opioid and heroin overdoses. She has developed machine learning techniques to understand high opioid prescribing.

She was elected to the board of directors of the College on Problems of Drug Dependence in 2022.

== Awards and honours ==
- 2017 Columbia University Mailman School of Public Health Dean's Award for Excellence in Mentoring
- 2021 Columbia University Irving Medical Center Mentor of the Year Award
- 2021 Tow Leadership Scholar
- 2021 Calderone Health Equity Awards

== Select publications ==
- William W Eaton; Silvia S Martins; Gerald Nestadt; O Joseph Bienvenu; Diana Clarke; Pierre Alexandre (19 September 2008). "The burden of mental disorders". Epidemiologic Reviews. 30: 1–14. doi:10.1093/epirev/mxn011. ISSN 0193-936X. PMC 2683377. PMID 18806255. Wikidata Q37195491.
- Magdalena Cerda; Christine Mauro; Ava Hamilton; et al. (13 November 2019). "Association Between Recreational Marijuana Legalization in the United States and Changes in Marijuana Use and Cannabis Use Disorder From 2008 to 2016". JAMA Psychiatry. doi:10.1001/jamapsychiatry.2019.3254. ISSN 2168-622X. PMID 31722000. Wikidata Q91268359.
- Silvia S Martins; Laura Sampson; Magdalena Cerdá; Sandro Galea (November 2015). "Worldwide Prevalence and Trends in Unintentional Drug Overdose: A Systematic Review of the Literature". American Journal of Public Health. 105 (11): e29-49, 2373. doi:10.2105/ajph.2015.302843. ISSN 1541-0048. PMC 4605170. PMID 26451760. Wikidata Q26785445.
