= Dénis Martins =

Portuguese footballer

Personal information
- Full name: Dénis Pinho Martins
- Date of birth: 30 June 1997 (age 29)
- Place of birth: Leiria, Portugal
- Height: 1.85 m (6 ft 1 in)
- Position: Centre-back

Team information
- Current team: Vitória de Setúbal
- Number: 3

Youth career
- 2005–2006: União Leiria
- 2006–2011: Benfica
- 2011–2012: União Leiria
- 2012–2013: Sandinenses
- 2013–2016: Vitória SC

Senior career*
Years	Team	Apps	(Gls)
2015–2016	Vitória SC B	11	(1)
2017–2018	Vilafranquense	35	(3)
2018–2019	Vitória SC B	9	(0)
2019–2020	Vilafranquense	18	(3)
2020–2023	União Leiria	31	(2)
2023–2024	Varzim	14	(0)
2024–2025	Marinhense	11	(0)
2025–2026	Vitória Sernache	20	(0)
2026–	Vitória de Setúbal	0	(0)

International career
2013–2014	Portugal U17	3	(0)
2014–2015	Portugal U18	3	(0)
2015–2016	Portugal U19	3	(0)
- * Club domestic league appearances and goals as of 13 September 2026

Dénis Pinho Martins (born 30 June 1997) is a Portuguese professional footballer who plays as a centre-back for Campeonato de Portugal club Vitória de Setúbal.
