= Isabel Martin Lewis =

American astronomer

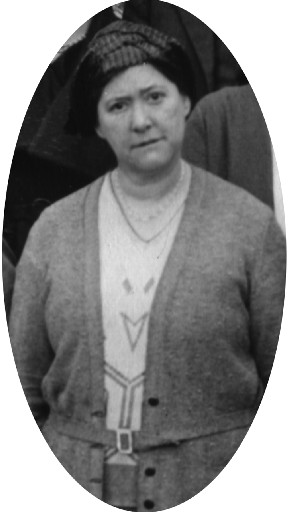
- Born: July 11, 1881; Old Orchard Beach, Maine
- Died: July 31, 1966 (aged 85)
- Education: Cornell University
- Scientific career
- Fields: Astronomy
- Workplaces: United States Naval Observatory

Isabel Martin Lewis (July 11, 1881 – July 31, 1966) was an American astronomer who was the first woman hired by the United States Naval Observatory as assistant astronomer. In 1918, Lewis was elected a member of the American Astronomical Society. She was also a member of the Royal Astronomical Society of Canada and the Astronomical Society of the Pacific.

== Early life ==
Isabel Eleanor Martin was born in Old Orchard Beach, Maine, on July 11, 1881. Lewis earned her A.B. from Cornell University in 1903 and earned her A.M. there in 1905, specializing in mathematics. From 1905 to 1907 she was an "astronomical computer" for Simon Newcomb. Under Newcomb, Martin worked on eclipse data, an experience that would prove essential to her later work.

Lewis began work as a computer at the Nautical Almanac Office in 1908. Although Lewis was not the first woman to be hired by the Naval Observatory (this was Maria Mitchell, who in 1849 was hired as a computer), Lewis was the first woman to be hired as assistant astronomer. At the NAO, Lewis met her husband, Clifford Spencer Lewis, another astronomer. They were married on December 4, 1912.

== Popularization of science ==
With the birth of her son, Raymond Winslow Lewis, Lewis worked only part-time at the observatory and began an effort to popularize science.

Writing three books and countless articles, Lewis started in 1916 to reach out to a popular audience about the wonders of astronomy and earth science. Her columns appeared in the New York Evening Sun, the Electrical Experimenter (later known as Science and Invention), Popular Astronomy, The Scientific Monthly, and the Astronomical Journal, among others. For thirty years, Lewis had a monthly column in Nature Magazine (this title was published by the American Nature Association and should not be confused with the journal Nature). Introducing her first article in Electrical Experimenter, editor Hugo Gernsback praised Lewis for her exactitude and learning, saying that she "has the rare faculty of interpreting difficult and dry subjects in a popular manner." This article, "Popular Astronomy: Dark Stars", was the first published in the magazine from a female writer.

The articles from the Sun were combined into a 1919 book, Splendors of the Sky, and her articles before 1922 in Science and Invention were included in the second part of her book Astronomy for Young Folks. In addition, in "News of the Stars" she gave lectures on the local radio station (WRC) and made presentations at schools and churches.

== Return to full-time work ==
Lewis returned to full-time work after her husband's death in 1927. On October 1, 1927 Lewis was promoted to Assistant Scientist. Lewis was further promoted to the rank of Astronomer in 1930.

A specialist in eclipses, at the Naval Observatory Lewis derived a faster and more accurate method to determine where an eclipse would be visible. She also found a way to predict more occultations of the Moon; these moments when the Moon passed before other astronomical bodies were used to investigate the Moon's orbit. Her new method for calculating solar eclipses allowed for a level of detail that could be used to understand the ionosphere.

During this period, she participated in expeditions to view the solar eclipse of June 19, 1936 in Russia. Also, she organized and participated in the Hayden Planetarium-Grace Eclipse Expedition to Peru to view, photograph, and broadcast by radio the solar eclipse of June 8, 1937.

Lewis retired from service at the Naval Observatory in 1951 but continued to publish in newspapers and magazines until 1955. The length of her career and her prominence are unlike that of other women in astronomy; according to Lankford and Stavings, only 12% of women astronomers from 1900-1940 had careers longer than 25 years.

== Bibliography ==
- 1905 A prediction of the solar eclipse of August 1905 (Thesis)
- 1919 Splendors of the Sky
- 1922 Astronomy for Young Folks
- 1924 A Handbook Of Solar Eclipses
