= Ibiapaba Martins =

Brazilian lawyer (1917–1985)

Ibiapaba de Oliveira Martins (1917–1985) was a Brazilian lawyer, journalist and writer. Born in Botucatu to a noted São Paulo family, he studied law at the Largo de São Francisco Law School (University of São Paulo). He became a well-regarded labour lawyer, specializing in union law. He also worked for São Paulo journals like Correio Paulistano and Última Hora.

As a writer, he met his greatest success with the novel Noites de Relâmpago, which won the Premio Jabuti for best literary novel in 1969. Other notable books were Bocainas do Vento Sul, Sangue na Pedra, Carta para a Mãe do Tempo, etc.

Martins was also variously an art critic, a successful judoka, a dog breeder and a genealogist. He was a member of the Academia Paulista de Letras (Seat 29) and the União Brasileira de Escritores. He died in 1985.

The Escola Municipal Infantil Ibiapaba Martins is named after him. The author Cléo Agbeni Martins is his niece.
