= Claudiano Martins Filho =

Brazilian politician (born 1989)

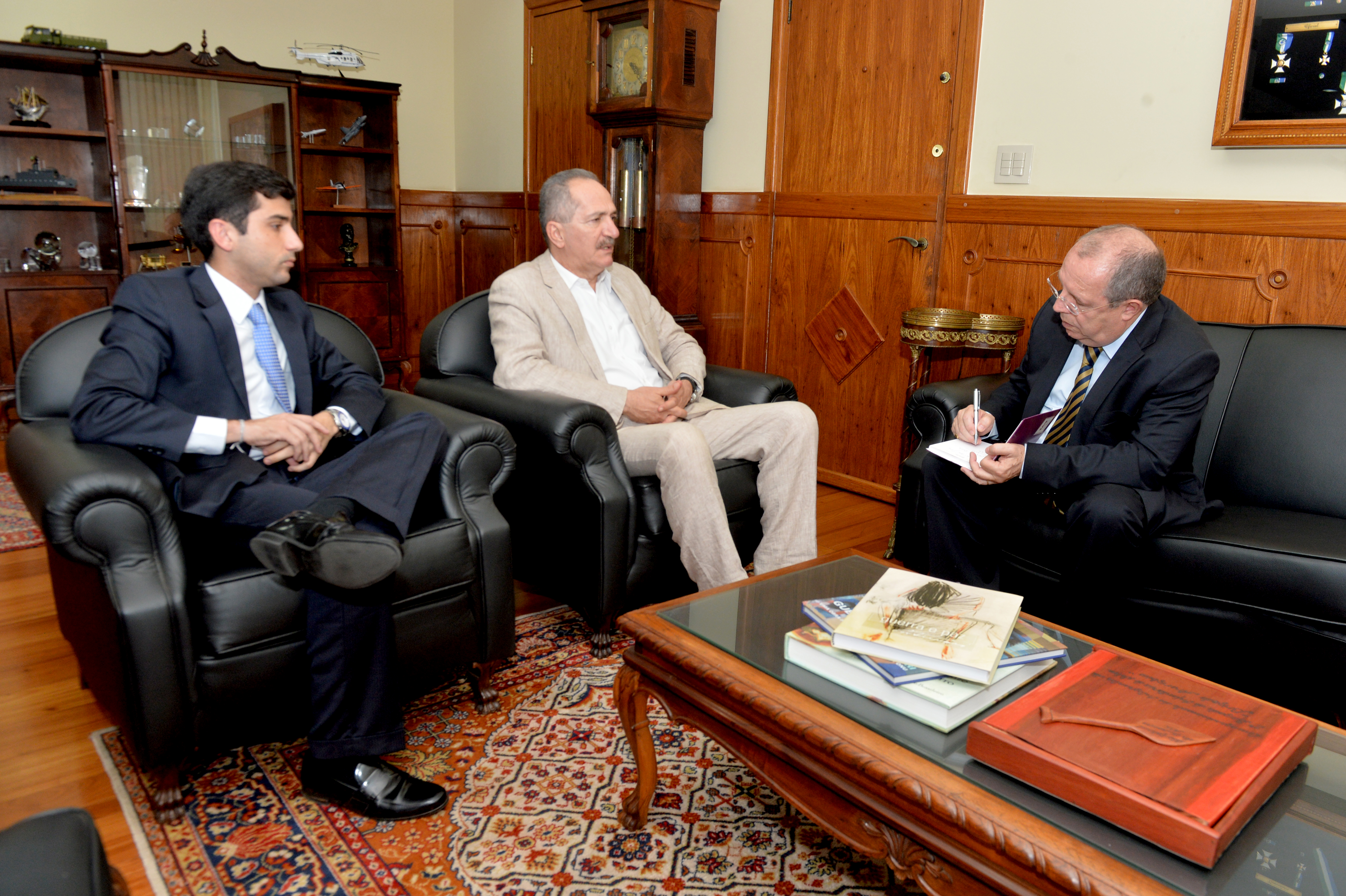
- Martins in 2015

Member of the Legislative Assembly of Pernambuco
- Incumbent
- Assumed office 1 February 2011

Personal details
- Born: 4 August 1989 (age 36)
- Party: Progressistas

Claudiano Martins Filho (born 4 August 1989) is a Brazilian politician serving as a member of the Legislative Assembly of Pernambuco since 2011. From 2021 to 2022, he served as secretary of agrarian development of Pernambuco.
