= Júlio César (footballer, born December 1983) =

Brazilian footballer

Personal information
- Full name: Júlio César Oliveira Martins
- Date of birth: 13 December 1983 (age 42)
- Place of birth: Jaboatão dos Guararapes, Brazil
- Height: 1.78 m (5 ft 10 in)
- Position: Defensive midfielder

Team information
- Current team: ADC Correlhã

Senior career*
Years	Team	Apps	(Gls)
2005	Serrano		
2005–2009	Valdevez	14	(0)
2006	→ Chaves (loan)	1	(0)
2007	→ Lusitânia (loan)	11	(0)
2009–2011	Académica	3	(0)
2009–2011	→ Aves (loan)	44	(1)
2012–2013	Moreirense	12	(0)
2013	Feirense	1	(0)
2013–2014	Al-Shabab		
2014–2015	1º Dezembro	10	(0)
2015–2016	Oriental	14	(1)
2016–2017	Vitória Sernache	19	(0)
2017–2018	Limianos		
2018–2019	ADC Correlhã	14	(0)
2019–2022	Atlético dos Arcos	28	(1)
2022–	ADC Correlhã		
- * Club domestic league appearances and goals as of 1 August 2021

Júlio César de Oliveira Martins (born 13 December 1983), known as Júlio César, is a Brazilian footballer who plays for Portuguese club ADC Correlhã.

== Football career ==
Júlio César began his career in his native Pernambuco, helping Serrano Futebol Clube (PE) to the Campeonato Pernambucano in 2005. In August 2005 he left his country and moved to Clube Atlético de Valdevez in Portugal, playing three seasons in the third division; in 2006–07 he started on loan to level two club Desportivo de Chaves, but finished the season in the same predicament in the division below, with S.C. Lusitânia.

In January 2009 César signed a 3 1/2-year contract with first division club Académica de Coimbra, making his competition debut on 8 February in a 0–1 loss at Rio Ave FC (45 minutes played).

In July 2009 he again left for the second level of Portuguese football, joining Desportivo das Aves on loan, and remaining there for two seasons. He played as a regular for the northern club, using Júlio Martins as his shirt name.

== Honours ==
Académica de Coimbra

- Taça de Portugal: 2011–12
