= Luciano Martins =

Brazilian association footballer

Personal information
- Full name: Luciano Luís Turconi Martins
- Date of birth: 3 March 1963 (age 63)
- Place of birth: Brazil
- Position: Striker

Senior career*
Years	Team	Apps	(Gls)
1985–1986	Reipas Lahti		
1986–1987	Portimonense	21	(7)
1987–1988	FC 08 Homburg	19	(0)
1988–1991	Portimonense	67	(10)
1991–1992	Rio Ave	22	(3)
1992	Ilves	20	(5)
1994–1996	FC Kuusysi	36+	(12+)
1997–1999	FC Lahti		
1999–2001	FC Hämeenlinna		
2002	TP-Lahti		
- * Club domestic league appearances and goals

Luciano Luís Turconi Martins (born 3 March 1963) is a Brazilian former footballer who last played as a striker for TP-Lahti.

== Early life ==
Martins grew up in Porto Alegre, Brazil.

== Playing career ==
In 1986, Martins signed for Portuguese side Portimonense, where he was regarded as one of the club's most important players. In 1987, he signed for German Bundesliga side FC 08 Homburg, where he helped the club achieve a 3-2 league win over German side FC Bayern on 22 August 1987, which he has regarded as one of the highlights of his playing career. In 1994, he signed for Finnish side FC Kuusysi, where he worked as a translator for the club's other Brazilian players. In 1997, he signed for Finnish second tier side FC Lahti, helping the club earn promotion to the Finnish top flight. He was regarded as one of the club's most important players.

== Managerial career ==
After retiring from professional football, Martins worked as assistant manager of Finnish side FC Lahti.

== Post-playing career ==
After retiring from professional football, Martins worked as the owner of Finland-based Italian restaurant Mamma Maria.

== Personal life ==
Martins is a Finnish citizen, is Brazilian of Italian and Portuguese descent, and has a daughter. He can speak German, English, and Portuguese.
