= Luís Martins (footballer, born October 1992) =

Portuguese footballer (born 1992)

Personal information
- Full name: Luís André Alves Martins
- Date of birth: 1 October 1992 (age 34)
- Place of birth: Santa Maria da Feira, Portugal
- Height: 1.85 m (6 ft 1 in)
- Position: Defender

Team information
- Current team: Oliveirense
- Number: 46

Youth career
- 2008–2011: Oliveirense

Senior career*
Years	Team	Apps	(Gls)
2011–2013	Oliveirense	0	(0)
2013	Bustelo (loan)	8	(0)
2013–2014	Bustelo	27	(3)
2013–	Oliveirense	0	(0)
- * Club domestic league appearances and goals as of 3 August 2014

Luís André Alves Martins (born 1 October 1992) is a Portuguese footballer who plays for U.D. Oliveirense as a defender.

== Career ==
Martins was born in Santa Maria da Feira. On 26 July 2014, he made his professional debut with Oliveirense in a 2014–15 Taça da Liga match against União Madeira.
