= Luís Paixão Martins =

Portuguese public relations expert and businessman

Luís Filipe Paixão Martins
- Born: January 1, 1954 (age 71); Lisbon, Portugal
- Occupation(s): Public relations executive, writer
- Known for: Founded one of the first communication consultancy firm in Portugal

Luís Paixão Martins (born 1 January 1954) is a Portuguese public relations professional and writer who was formerly a journalist and a communications and public relations consultant. He founded LPM Comunicação, the first communication consultancy firm in Portugal which became a leader in the sector, and created the NewsMuseum.

== Early life ==
Luís Paixão Martins became interested in radio while a student at Liceu Camões in Lisbon. He entered the school’s radio - ERE (Equipa Radiofónica de Emissão).

== Career ==
In 1967. In 1971 he started his professional activity as a broadcaster on Radio Renascença. It was there that he became a professional as a radio presenter.

In 1975, already as a journalist, he joined Jornal Novo . In 1976 he moved to news agency ANOP. He returned to radio in 1979 when Rádio Comercial was launched. There he worked as the editor for morning news and information programs. In 1985 he was editor-in-chief at NP Agency (News of Portugal). He worked at weekly newspapers such as O Jornal and Se7e. In 1977/8 he attended the CPJ (Centre de Perfectionnement des Journalistes et des Cadres de la Presse) and did an internship in France Press.

In 1986 Luís Paixão Martins left the profession of journalism to dedicate himself to council in Communication and Public Relations, a management function whose concept he introduced in Portugal. LPM Comunicação, the firm he founded and led until 2014, has in its portfolio some of the most important Portuguese business groups and several global companies in a wide range of sectors. Luís Paixão Martins collaborated in the election campaigns of José Sócrates (first left-wing absolute majority in Portugal), Aníbal Cavaco Silva (first right-wing candidate elected president) and candidates for other political authorities in Portugal, Angola and Cape Verde.

In 2007 he asked the Portuguese parliament to create a "specific accreditation" for PR agencies professionals, releasing a discussion on lobbying activity in Portugal.

The success of his work allowed him to establish and acquire shares in other marketing and communication companies, which he aggregates in a holding named Flat Marketing. Flat Marketing is the leading public relations Portuguese group in Portugal.

In 2012, he founded the hybrid public relations concept, a methodology that integrates all the communication processes of brands and organizations with the media and the public. The concept relies on the integration of 2.0 PR skills on existing methodologies through a process of hybridization.

In 2015, he announced the creation in Sintra, of the NewsMuseum, a place designed to raise awareness and promote Media, Journalism and Communication.

Based on his experience in electoral campaigns, Luís Paixão Martins edited, in early 2023, the book "Como perder uma eleição" ("How to Lose an Election") - Zigurate Books. At the end of the same year he published, in the same publisher, the title "Como mentem as sondagens" ("How the polls lie").

== Personal life ==
Semi-retired from professional life, he lives between Lisbon, where he was born in 1954, and a border village of Monfortinho, where he maintains forestry and rural tourism activities.

== Bibliography ==
- As Armas dos Jornalistas – A Linguagem ao Alcance de Todos, Lisbon, Alia Publisher, 1983
- Schiu… Está aqui um Jornalista – Tretas, Meias Verdades e Completas Mentiras Acerca da Imagem, Lisbon, Editorial Notícias Publisher, 2001
- Preface and translation of The Fall of Advertising and the Rise of Public Relations, authors Al Ries and Laura Ries, Lisbon, Casa das Letras Publisher, 2003
- Preface of Propaganda, author Edward Bernays, Lisbon, Mareantes Publisher, 2006
- Tinha Tudo para Correr Mal – Memórias de um Comunicador Acidental, Lisbon, Chiado Publisher, 2015
- Como perder uma eleição - Absolute majorities consultant's electoral communication manual, by Luís Paixão Martins, Lisbon, Zigurate Books, January 2023
- Como mentem as sondagens, by Luís Paixão Martins, Lisbon, Zigurate Books, October 2023
- Propaganda, Edward Bernays / Luís Paixão Martins - A communication classic in a special edition commented and contextualized by Luís Paixão Martins. Lisbon, Zigurate Books, May 2024
