= Margarida Martins =

Portuguese teacher, researcher, activist, politician and poet

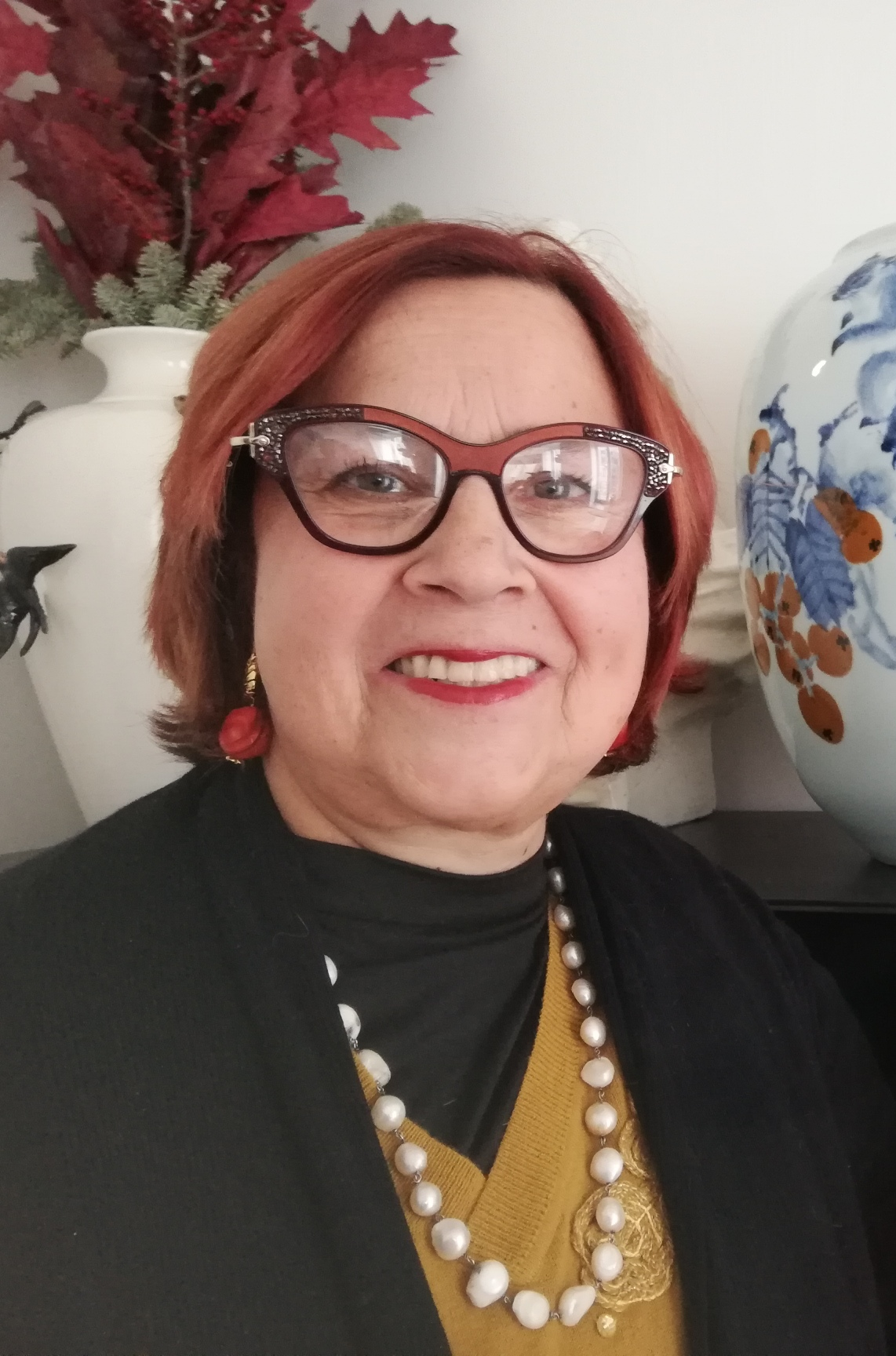
- Born: Margarida Carmen Nazaré Martins; 11 July 1953 (age 72); Lisbon, Portugal
- Occupations: Politician; Social activist
- Known for: HIV/AIDS activist

Margarida Martins (born 11 July 1953, Lisbon, Portugal) is a social activist and politician. She was a pioneer in Portugal in the development of HIV/AIDS awareness and prevention, having been co-founder of Associação Abraço (Association Hug), which she presided over for 21 years.

== Early life ==
Margarida Carmen Nazaré Martins was born on 11 July 1953 in the old parish of Socorro, now part of the parish of Santa Maria Maior, in the Portuguese capital of Lisbon. Her family was very political, with her father being a communist, and other members being anarcho-syndicalists. She saw illness at first hand, as her mother was hospitalized for six years with tuberculosis. Her first job was to teach a child who was in hospital connected to an artificial lung. After leaving school, she worked for a publisher and a construction company. After marrying, she and her husband had a bar in the Lapa neighbourhood in Lisbon but she continued to work for the publisher. From 1983 to 1991 she worked at one of Lisbon's most famous nightlife venues.

== Work with HIV/AIDS ==
In 1991, Martins came-to-face with HIV/AIDS when a friend was hospitalized in Lisbon's Egas Moniz hospital, and eventually died. At the end of 1991, she was one of a small group of volunteers who sought to provide support to hospitalized patients in the infectious diseases unit of the Egas Moniz hospital, but it was only after the death of her friend that the idea of creating an association that could help people infected with HIV was born. On 26 April 1992, which would have been the friend's birthday, she and others organized a show at Coliseu dos Recreios auditorium to raise the resources to create an association. The Abraço (Hug) Association was set up a few weeks later. By the time Martins retired in 2013, it had close to 100 employees.

The association initially tried to improve the conditions of infected patients hospitalized in Egas Moniz. Only later did it start a series of campaigns at national level, aimed at prevention. This involved travelling around the country to give talks to schools and elsewhere on the subject. The Association grew rapidly and became able to provide home support to those infected, assist HIV-positive children of HIV-positive parents, provide a shelter for bedridden people and apartments for emergencies. Emphasis was also placed on disease prevention, particularly in trying to get the Portuguese government to allocate more resources for this.

Over the years Martins developed a reputation for having an abrasive personality. A visit to Brazil with Mário Soares resulted in the Brazilian press calling her "the windstorm of Portugal". A Portuguese writer once referred to her as a "rough oyster". She admits to being a "fighter".

== Honours and awards ==
- Martins was awarded the degree of Commander of the Order of Merit on 6 March 1998, with the award presented by the then president of Portugal, Jorge Sampaio.
