= Isabel Martins =

Mozambican politician

Member of the People's Assembly
- In office 1977–

Isabel Martins was a Mozambican politician. In 1977 she was one of the first group of women elected to the People's Assembly.

== Biography ==
During the Mozambican War of Independence she travelled to Algeria, where FRELIMO fighters receive training. She was a FRELIMO candidate in the 1977 parliamentary elections, in which she was one of the first group of 27 women elected to the People's Assembly. She married Camilo de Sousa; one of their children, Camila Maissune de Sousa, became a well-known artist.
