= 2012–13 S.C. Braga season =

Braga
2012–13 season
- Manager: José Peseiro
- Stadium: Estádio Municipal de Braga
- Primeira Liga: 4th
- Taça de Portugal: Quarter-finals
- Taça da Liga: Winners
- UEFA Champions League: Group stage
- Top goalscorer: League: Eder (13)

The 2012–13 season was Sporting Clube de Braga's 38th consecutive season in the Primeira Liga and 71st season in existence as a football club. In addition to the domestic league, Braga participated in the Taça de Portugal, the Taça da Liga and the UEFA Champions League.

== Squad ==
Squad at end of season

Note: Flags indicate national team as defined under FIFA eligibility rules; some limited exceptions apply. Players may hold more than one non-FIFA nationality.

No.	Pos.	Nation	Player
1	GK	POR	Quim
2	DF	FRA	Vincent Sasso
3	MF	GER	Maximilian Haas
4	DF	POR	Nuno André Coelho
5	MF	POR	Ruben Amorim
6	DF	POR	Emídio Rafael
7	FW	POR	João Pedro
8	MF	BRA	Márcio Mossoró
10	MF	POR	Hélder Barbosa
14	MF	POR	Rúben Micael
15	DF	BRA	Baiano
17	FW	POR	Eder
19	MF	POR	Rabiola
20	DF	NGA	Elderson Echiéjilé
22	MF	LBY	Djamal Mahamat
23	GK	POR	Cristiano
24	GK	RUS	Stanislav Kritsyuk
25	MF	BRA	Leandro Salino
26	MF	BRA	Paulo Vinícius

No.	Pos.	Nation	Player
27	MF	POR	Custódio
29	FW	CPV	Zé Luís
30	FW	BRA	Alan
40	MF	BRA	Guilherme
44	DF	BRA	Douglão
45	MF	POR	Hugo Viana
54	MF	POR	João Patrão
55	MF	POR	Tiago Ribeiro
60	MF	BFA	Victor Nikiema
63	MF	BRA	Mauro
70	FW	POR	Zé Manuel
73	GK	POR	Pedro Cavadas
74	DF	POR	Gonçalo Silva
75	DF	BRA	Aderllan Santos
77	DF	POR	Mário Palmeira
79	MF	BRA	Carlos Eduardo
83	FW	BRA	Carlão
99	FW	BRA	Manoel

== Competitions ==
=== Overview ===
Competition	First match	Last match	Starting round	Final position	Record							
Competition	First match	Last match	Starting round	Final position	Pld	W	D	L	GF	GA	GD	Win %
Primeira Liga	18 August 2012	19 May 2013	Matchday 1	4th	30	16	4	10	60	44	+16	53.33
Taça de Portugal	19 October 2012	16 January 2013	Third round	Quarter-finals	4	3	0	1	9	4	+5	75.00
Taça da Liga	19 December 2012	13 April 2013	Third round	Winners	5	3	2	0	6	1	+5	60.00
UEFA Champions League	22 August 2012	5 December 2012	Play-off round	Group stage	8	1	2	5	9	15	−6	12.50
Total					47	23	8	16	84	64	+20	48.94

Source: Competitions

=== Primeira Liga ===
==== League table ====
Pos	Team	Pld	W	D	L	GF	GA	GD	Pts	Qualification or relegation
2	Benfica	30	24	5	1	77	20	+57	77	Qualification for the Champions League group stage
3	Paços de Ferreira	30	14	12	4	42	29	+13	54	Qualification for the Champions League play-off round
4	Braga	30	16	4	10	60	44	+16	52	Qualification for the Europa League play-off round
5	Estoril	30	13	6	11	47	37	+10	45	Qualification for the Europa League third qualifying round
6	Rio Ave	30	12	6	12	35	42	−7	42 (Note: Rio Ave ahead of Sporting CP on head-to-head record; Rio Ave–Sporting CP 2–1, Sporting CP–Rio Ave 0–1)	

Source: LPFP (in Portuguese)
Rules for classification: 1) Points; 2) Head-to-head points; 3) Head-to-head goal difference; 4) Head-to-head away goals scored; 5) Goal difference; 6) Matches won; 7) Goals scored; 8) Play-off.
(Note: LPFP decided that only criteria 1, 5, 6 and 7 would be applied to establish the classification during the competition.)

==== Results summary ====
Overall								Home						Away					
Pld	W	D	L	GF	GA	GD	Pts	W	D	L	GF	GA	GD	W	D	L	GF	GA	GD
30	16	4	10	60	44	+16	52	9	1	5	34	23	+11	7	3	5	26	21	+5

Source: Soccerway

==== Results by round ====
Round	1	2	3	4	5	6	7	8	9	10	11	12	13	14	15	16	17	18	19	20	21	22	23	24	25	26	27	28	29	30
Ground	A	H	A	H	A	H	A	H	A	H	A	H	H	A	H	H	A	H	A	H	A	H	A	H	A	H	A	A	H	A
Result	D	W	L	W	W	D	W	W	L	L	W	W	W	L	W	L	D	L	D	W	W	W	W	L	L	W	L	W	L	W
Position	5	3	6	3	3	3	3	3	3	3	3	3	3	3	3	3	4	4	4	4	4	3	3	4	4	4	4	4	4	4
Points	1	4	4	7	10	11	14	17	17	17	20	23	26	26	29	29	30	30	31	34	37	40	43	43	43	46	46	49	49	52

Source: Worldfootball
A = Away; H = Home; W = Win; D = Draw; L = Loss

==== Matches ====
18 August 2012 1	Benfica	2–2	Braga	Lisbon
20:15 WEST (UTC+1)	Pereira (yellow card) 19'; Salvio 49'; Bruno César (yellow card) 60'; Cardozo 73', (yellow card) 74'	Report	Salino (yellow card) 24'; Alan (yellow card) 36'; Douglão (yellow card) 52' (yellow-red card) 72'; Melgarejo 54' (o.g.); Amorim (yellow card) 56'; Mossoró 63'	Stadium: Estádio da Luz

25 August 2012 2	Braga	3–1	Beira-Mar	Braga
18:15 WEST (UTC+1)	Micael 27', 33'; Baiano (yellow card) 81'; Amorim 85'; Custódio (yellow card) 90'	Report	Hugo (yellow card) 74'; Jaime (yellow card) 84'; Petrolina 90+4'	Stadium: Estádio Municipal de Braga

2 September 2012 3	Paços de Ferreira	2–0	Braga	Paços de Ferreira
18:00 WEST (UTC+1)	Cohene 12'; Anunciação (yellow card) 63'; Hurtado 80'; Manuel José (yellow card) 90+4'	Report		Stadium: Estádio da Mata Real

23 September 2012 4	Braga	4–1	Rio Ave	Braga
18:00 WEST (UTC+1)	Barbosa (yellow card) 14'; Douglão (yellow card) 18'; Eder 45', 69'; Amorim 63'; Custódio 75' (pen.); Mahamat (yellow card) 90+2'	Report	Marcelo (yellow card) 29'; Wíres (yellow card) 45'; Edimar 53'; Nivaldo (red card) 73'	Stadium: Estádio Municipal de Braga

28 September 2012 5	Vitória de Guimarães	0–2	Braga	Guimarães
21:30 WEST (UTC+1)	Addy (yellow card) 72'; Soudani (yellow card) 88'	Report	Eder 55'; Custódio (yellow card) 55'; Micael (yellow card) 70'; Viana 86'	Stadium: Estádio D. Afonso Henriques

7 October 2012 6	Braga	4–4	Olhanense	Braga
16:30 WEST (UTC+1)	Barbosa 10'; Micael (yellow card) 14'; Douglão 48', 90+3'; Custódio (yellow card) 63'; Echiéjilé (yellow card) 67'; Eder 81'	Report	Abdi 4'; Ivanildo 26', 35', (yellow card) 56'; Luís Filipe (yellow card) 34'; Maurício (yellow card) 51'; Amorim 55' (o.g.); Yontcha (yellow card) 89'; Bracali (yellow card) 90+4'	Stadium: Estádio Municipal de Braga

28 October 2012 7	Marítimo	0–2	Braga	Funchal
18:00 WET (UTC)	Roberge (yellow card) 56'; Salin (yellow card) 86' (yellow-red card) 86'	Report	Salino (yellow card) 19'; Vinícius (yellow card) 33'; Echiéjilé (yellow card) 39'; Eder 54', 87'; Barbosa (yellow card) 61'; Beto (yellow card) 82'	Stadium: Estádio dos Barreiros

3 November 2012 8	Braga	3–1	Gil Vicente	Braga
18:30 WET (UTC)	Zé Luís 17'; Custódio (yellow card) 25'; Micael (yellow card) 62'; Alan 63' (pen.); Baiano (yellow card) 82'; Viana 89'	Report	Luís Carlos (yellow card) 28'; Yero 54', (yellow card) 76'; Peixoto (yellow card) 57'; Halisson (yellow card) 63'	Stadium: Estádio Municipal de Braga

11 November 2012 9	Sporting CP	1–0	Braga	Lisbon
20:15 WET (UTC)	Van Wolfswinkel 4'; Elias (yellow card) 27'; Rojo (yellow card) 45'; Dier (yellow card) 51'; Fernandes (yellow card) 82'; Patrício (yellow card) 90'	Report	Salino (yellow card) 10'; Echiéjilé (yellow card) 30'; Coelho (yellow card) 43'; Viana (yellow card) 51'	Stadium: Estádio José Alvalade

25 November 2012 10	Braga	0–2	Porto	Braga
20:15 WET (UTC)	Custódio (yellow card) 51'; Ismaily (yellow card) 71'; Salino (yellow card) 88'	Report	Fernando (yellow card) 38'; Varela (yellow card) 62'; Rodríguez 90'; Helton (yellow card) 90'; Martínez 90+4'	Stadium: Estádio Municipal de Braga

10 December 2012 11	Académica	1–4	Braga	Coimbra
18:15 WET (UTC)	Cissé (yellow card) 82', (goal) 86'	Report	Ismaily 8'; Amorim 16'; Mossoró 62'; Barbosa (yellow card) 77'; Carlão 80'	Stadium: Estádio Cidade de Coimbra

16 December 2012 12	Braga	3–0	Estoril	Braga
18:00 WET (UTC)	Viana 4'; Custódio (yellow card) 21'; Alan (yellow card) 53'; Mossoró 58'; Eder 62'; Salino (yellow card) 77'	Report	Jefferson (yellow card) 40'; Vitória (yellow card) 67'	Stadium: Estádio Municipal de Braga

6 January 2013 13	Braga	1–0	Moreirense	Braga
18:00 WET (UTC)	Viana (yellow card) 36'; Eder 56'; Ismaily (yellow card) 77'; Mossoró (yellow card) 78'; Amorim (yellow card) 81'	Report	Wágner (yellow card) 43'; Gaúcho (yellow card) 57'; Augusto (yellow card) 70'	Stadium: Estádio Municipal de Braga

12 January 2013 14	Nacional	3–2	Braga	Funchal
20:30 WET (UTC)	Da Costa (yellow card) 54'; Claudemir (yellow card) 56'; Mexer 58', (yellow card) 76'; Barcelos 60'; Marçal (yellow card) 70'; Ismaily 77' (o.g.)	Report	Barbosa 37'; Mossoró (yellow card) 54'; Viana (yellow card) 70' (yellow-red card) 84'; Eder 83', (yellow card) 90+3'	Stadium: Estádio da Madeira

20 January 2013 15	Braga	4–1	Vitória de Setúbal	Braga
18:00 WET (UTC)	Mossoró 2'; Haas (yellow card) 42'; Custódio 45+1'; Viana (yellow card) 48'; Amorim 58'; Micael 88'; Salino (yellow card) 90+1'; Vinícius (red card) 90+3'	Report	Jorginho Sousa 87'	Stadium: Estádio Municipal de Braga

26 January 2013 16	Braga	1–2	Benfica	Braga
20:15 WET (UTC)	Ismaily (yellow card) 61'; João Pedro 77'; Haas (red card) 85'	Report	Salvio 5'; Lima 35'; Matić (yellow card) 51'; Gaitán (yellow card) 73'; Artur Moraes (yellow card) 90+2'	Stadium: Estádio Municipal de Braga

3 February 2013 17	Beira-Mar	3–3	Braga	Aveiro
18:00 WET (UTC)	Yazalde 11'; Sampaio 32'; Dias (yellow card) 44'; Tonel (yellow card) 46'; Ribeiro 56'	Report	Eder 40'; Alan 45'; Viana (yellow card) 57'; João Pedro 77'	Stadium: Estádio Municipal de Aveiro

11 February 2013 18	Braga	2–3	Paços de Ferreira	Braga
20:00 WET (UTC)	Salino 56'; Eder 63'; Mossoró (yellow card) 72'; Custódio (yellow card) 77'; Barbosa (yellow card) 84'	Report	Hurtado 16', 38'; Cícero 50'; Luíz Carlos (yellow card) 79'; Cohene (yellow card) 88'	Stadium: Estádio Municipal de Braga

18 February 2013 19	Rio Ave	1–1	Braga	Vila do Conde
20:00 WET (UTC)	Kouka 2', (red card) 88'; Lopes (yellow card) 41'; Wíres (yellow card) 45+1'; Vilas Boas (yellow card) 53'	Report	Salino (yellow card) 23'; Alan 45+3' (pen.)	Stadium: Estádio dos Arcos

23 February 2013 20	Braga	3–2	Vitória de Guimarães	Braga
18:00 WET (UTC)	Eder 42', 58', (yellow card) 67'; Vinícius 52'; Echiéjilé (yellow card) 87' (yellow-red card) 90+2'	Report	Bamba (yellow card) 21'; Oliveira 79'; Soudani 85'	Stadium: Estádio Municipal de Braga

4 March 2013 21	Olhanense	0–1	Braga	Olhão
20:30 WET (UTC)	Jander (yellow card) 68'; Terroso (yellow card) 79'; Babanco (yellow card) 90+1'	Report	Salino 11'; Vinícius (yellow card) 32'; Alan (yellow card) 68'; Quim (yellow card) 88'; Mauro (yellow card) 90+2'	Stadium: Estádio José Arcanjo

9 March 2013 22	Braga	2–0	Marítimo	Braga
18:00 WET (UTC)	Viana 41'; Salino (yellow card) 73'; Custódio (yellow card) 82'; Alan 90'	Report	Héldon (yellow card) 29'; Roberge (yellow card) 35'; Márcio Rozário (yellow card) 36'; Ferreira (yellow card) 70'; Olberdam (yellow card) 79'	Stadium: Estádio Municipal de Braga

15 March 2013 23	Gil Vicente	1–3	Braga	Barcelos
20:00 WET (UTC)	Cunha (yellow card) 58'; Yero (yellow card) 60'; Hugo Vieira 61'; Paulo Jorge (yellow card) 68'	Report	Baiano (yellow card) 34'; Viana 45+1', 81'; Santos (yellow card) 76'; Zé Luís 84'	Stadium: Estádio Cidade de Barcelos

1 April 2013 24	Braga	2–3	Sporting CP	Braga
20:30 WEST (UTC+1)	Echiéjilé 25'; Carlão 36'; Santos (yellow card) 77'	Report	Van Wolfswinkel 8', 29', 90+2'; Joãozinho (red card) 58'; Martins (yellow card) 63'	Stadium: Estádio Municipal de Braga

8 April 2013 25	Porto	3–1	Braga	Porto
20:00 WEST (UTC+1)	Rodríguez 36'; Kelvin 82', 85'	Report	Alan 22'; Quim (yellow card) 67'	Stadium: Estádio do Dragão

19 April 2013 26	Braga	1–0	Académica	Braga
20:00 WEST (UTC+1)	Micael 44'	Report	Cabral (yellow card) 40'; Ferreira (yellow card) 70'	Stadium: Estádio Municipal de Braga

26 April 2013 27	Estoril	2–1	Braga	Estoril
20:00 WEST (UTC+1)	Douglão 54' (o.g.); Jefferson (yellow card) 54'; Vitória 67'; Leal (yellow card) 73'; Evandro (yellow card) 82'	Report	Baiano (yellow card) 4'; Micael (yellow card) 12'; Mossoró 18'; Viana (yellow card) 73'; Barbosa (yellow card) 74'; Echiéjilé (red card) 84'; Douglão (yellow card) 89'	Stadium: Estádio António Coimbra da Mota

3 May 2013 28	Moreirense	2–3	Braga	Moreira de Cónegos
20:00 WEST (UTC+1)	Pintassilgo (yellow card) 44'; Espinho 50', (yellow card) 85'; Ghilas 55'; Gonçalves (yellow card) 57'; Hanin (yellow card) 62'	Report	Carlão 10'; Custódio (yellow card) 42'; Santos 45'; Micael (red card) 51'; Amorim (yellow card) 74'; Zé Luís 83'	Stadium: Parque de Jogos Comendador Joaquim de Almeida Freitas

11 May 2013 29	Braga	1–3	Nacional	Braga
18:15 WEST (UTC+1)	Viana 35'	Report	Ghazal (yellow card) 31'; Keita 76'; Santos 78' (o.g.); Mateus 80'	Stadium: Estádio Municipal de Braga

19 May 2013 30	Vitória de Setúbal	0–1	Braga	Setúbal
18:30 WEST (UTC+1)	Santos (yellow card) 90+1'	Report	Zé Luís 33'; Mauro (yellow card) 57'	Stadium: Estádio do Bonfim

=== Taça de Portugal ===
19 October 2012 Third round	Braga	3–0 (a.e.t.)	Leixões	Braga
20:15 WEST (UTC+1)	Viana 98'; Micael 103'; Eder 115'	Report		Stadium: Estádio Municipal de Braga

16 November 2012 Fourth round	Pampilhosa	1–3	Braga	Mealhada
18:45 WET (UTC)	Leitão 38'	Report	Viana 12'; Alan 20' (pen.); Zé Luís 90+1'	Stadium: Estádio Municipal Dr. Américo Couto

30 November 2012 Fifth round	Braga	2–1	Porto	Braga
20:15 WET (UTC)	Danilo 75' (o.g.); Eder 79'	Report	Mangala 13'; Castro (red card) 72'	Stadium: Estádio Municipal de Braga

16 January 2013 Quarter-finals	Vitória de Guimarães	2–1 (a.e.t.)	Braga	Guimarães
20:45 WET (UTC)	Barrientos 1', 93', (yellow card) 39'; Pereira (yellow card) 6'; Olímpio (yellow card) 11'; Freire (yellow card) 33'; Bamba (yellow card) 90'; Crivellaro (yellow card) 116'; Douglas (yellow card) 120'	Report	Mossoró (yellow card) 11'; Custódio (yellow card) 69'; Eder (yellow card) 77', (goal) 85'	Stadium: Estádio D. Afonso Henriques

=== Taça da Liga ===
==== Third round ====
Pos	Team	Pld	W	D	L	GF	GA	GD	Pts	Qualification
1	Braga	3	2	1	0	5	1	+4	7	Advance to knockout phase
2	Vitória de Guimarães	3	1	2	0	3	2	+1	5	
3	Beira-Mar	3	0	2	1	2	5	−3	2	
4	Naval	3	0	1	2	1	3	−2	1	

19 December 2012 1	Vitória de Guimarães	0–0	Braga	Guimarães
20:00 WET (UTC)		Report	Vinícius (red card) 53'	Stadium: Estádio D. Afonso Henriques

2 January 2013 2	Naval	1–2	Braga	Figueira da Foz
18:00 WET (UTC)	Regula 3' (pen.)	Report	Haas 23'; Custódio 79' (pen.)	Stadium: Estádio Municipal José Bento Pessoa

9 January 2013 3	Braga	3–0	Beira-Mar	Braga
18:00 WET (UTC)	Carlão 37'; Amorim 41'; Viana 88'	Report		Stadium: Estádio Municipal de Braga

==== Knockout phase ====
===== Semi-finals =====
27 February 2013 Semi-finals	Braga	0–0 (3–2 p)	Benfica	Braga
19:45 WET (UTC)		Report		Stadium: Estádio Municipal de Braga
	Penalties
	Alan (penalty missed); Custódio (penalty scored); João Pedro (penalty scored); Amorim (penalty scored)		(penalty scored) Rodrigo; (penalty missed) Luisão; (penalty scored) Pérez; (penalty missed) Roderick; (penalty missed) Gaitán

===== Final =====
13 April 2013 Final	Braga	1–0	Porto	Braga
19:45 WEST (UTC+1)	Alan 45'	Report	Ba (yellow card) (yellow-red card) 45'	Stadium: Estádio Municipal de Braga

=== UEFA Champions League ===
==== Play-off round ====
22 August 2012 First leg	Braga (Portugal)	1–1	(Italy) Udinese	Braga, Portugal
19:45 WEST (UTC+1)	Lima (yellow card) 50'; Ismaily 68'	Report	Pinzi (yellow card) 13'; Di Natale (yellow card) 21'; Basta 23'; Benatia (yellow card) 35'; Domizzi (yellow card) 75'; Danilo (yellow card) 80'	Stadium: Estádio Municipal de Braga; Attendance: 13,520; Referee: Wolfgang Stark (Germany); Assistant referees: Jan-Hendrik Salver (Germany), Mike Pickel (Germany); Fourth official: Guido Kleve (Germany); Goal-line assistants: Tobias Welz (Germany), Marco Fritz (Germany)

28 August 2012 Second leg	Udinese (Italy)	1–1 (a.e.t.) (2–2 agg.) (4–5 p)	(Portugal) Braga	Udine, Italy
20:45 CEST (UTC+2)	Armero 25'; Pinzi (yellow card) 61'; Di Natale (yellow card) 75'	Report	Micael 72'; Mossoró (yellow card) 103'	Stadium: Stadio Friuli; Attendance: 19,560; Referee: Björn Kuipers (Netherlands); Assistant referees: Sander van Roekel (Netherlands), Erwin Zeinstra (Netherlands); Fourth official: Berry Simons (Netherlands); Goal-line assistants: Pol van Boekel (Netherlands), Richard Liesveld (Netherlands)
	Penalties
	Domizzi (penalty scored); Pinzi (penalty scored); Maicosuel (penalty missed); Armero (penalty scored); Di Natale (penalty scored)		(penalty scored) Lima; (penalty scored) Custódio; (penalty scored) Eder; (penalty scored) Paulo César; (penalty scored) Micael
Note: 2–2 on aggregate. Braga won 5–4 on penalties.

==== Group stage ====
Pos	Team	Pld	W	D	L	GF	GA	GD	Pts	Qualification	MUN	GAL	CLJ	BRA
1	(England) Manchester United	6	4	0	2	9	6	+3	12	Advance to knockout phase	—	1–0	0–1	3–2
2	(Turkey) Galatasaray	6	3	1	2	7	6	+1	10 (Note: Head-to-head points: Galatasaray 4, CFR Cluj 1.)	Advance to knockout phase	1–0	—	1–1	0–2
3	(Romania) CFR Cluj	6	3	1	2	9	7	+2	10	Transfer to Europa League	1–2	1–3	—	3–1
4	(Portugal) Braga	6	1	0	5	7	13	−6	3		1–3	1–2	0–2	—

Source: Soccerway
Notes:

19 September 2012 1	Braga (Portugal)	0–2	(Romania) CFR Cluj	Braga, Portugal
19:00 WEST (UTC+1)	Barbosa (yellow card) 82'	Report	Bastos 19', 34', (yellow card) 60'; Felgueiras (yellow card) 45+4'	Stadium: Estádio Municipal de Braga; Attendance: 10,922; Referee: Peter Rasmussen (Denmark); Assistant referees: Henrik Sønderby (Denmark), Lars Rix (Denmark); Fourth official: Lars Hummelgaard (Denmark); Goal-line assistants: Kenn Hansen (Denmark), Michael Tykgaard (Denmark)

2 October 2012 2	Galatasaray (Turkey)	0–2	(Portugal) Braga	Istanbul, Turkey
21:45 EEST (UTC+3)	Felipe Melo (yellow card) 2'; Nounkeu (yellow card) 41'	Report	Micael 27'; Viana (yellow card) 31'; Custódio (yellow card) 46'; Alan 90+4'	Stadium: Türk Telekom Arena; Attendance: 46,987; Referee: Tom Harald Hagen (Norway); Assistant referees: Dag-Roger Nebben (Norway), Magnus Lundberg (Norway); Fourth official: Geir Åge Holen (Norway); Goal-line assistants: Espen Berntsen (Norway), Ken Henry Johnsen (Norway)

23 October 2012 3	Manchester United (England)	3–2	(Portugal) Braga	Manchester, England
19:45 BST (UTC+1)	Hernández 25', 75'; Evans 62'	Report	Alan 2', 20'; Vinícius (yellow card) 48'; Echiéjilé (yellow card) 53'	Stadium: Old Trafford; Attendance: 73,195; Referee: Milorad Mažić (Serbia); Assistant referees: Milovan Ristić (Serbia), Igor Radojčić (Serbia); Fourth official: Vladimir Jovanović (Serbia); Goal-line assistants: Milenko Vukadinović (Serbia), Miodrag Gogić (Serbia)

7 November 2012 4	Braga (Portugal)	1–3	(England) Manchester United	Braga, Portugal
19:45 WET (UTC)	Alan 49' (pen.); Eder (yellow card) 66'; Custódio (yellow card) 70'	Report	Smalling (yellow card) 39'; Van Persie 80'; Rooney 84' (pen.); Hernández 90+2'	Stadium: Estádio Municipal de Braga; Attendance: 15,388; Referee: Felix Brych (Germany); Assistant referees: Mark Borsch (Germany), Stefan Lupp (Germany); Fourth official: Mike Pickel (Germany); Goal-line assistants: Felix Zwayer (Germany), Guido Winkmann (Germany)

20 November 2012 5	CFR Cluj (Romania)	3–1	(Portugal) Braga	Cluj-Napoca, Romania
21:45 EET (UTC+2)	Rui Pedro 7', 15', 33', (yellow card) 70'; Sougou (yellow card) 72'; Cadú (yellow card) 84'	Report	Alan 17'; Douglão (red card) 45+1'; Mossoró (yellow card) 88'	Stadium: Dr. Constantin Rădulescu Stadium; Attendance: 14,635; Referee: Sergei Karasev (Russia); Assistant referees: Nikolai Golubev (Russia), Tikhon Kalugin (Russia); Fourth official: Anton Averianov (Russia); Goal-line assistants: Aleksei Nikolaev (Russia), Maksim Layushkin (Russia)

5 December 2012 6	Braga (Portugal)	1–2	(Turkey) Galatasaray	Braga, Portugal
19:45 WET (UTC)	Mossoró 32', (yellow card) 85'; Salino (yellow card) 49'; Amorim (yellow card) 83'	Report	B. Yılmaz 58', (yellow card) 90+2'; Riera (yellow card) 65'; A. Yılmaz 78'; İnan (yellow card) 85'	Stadium: Estádio Municipal de Braga; Attendance: 8,964; Referee: Nicola Rizzoli (Italy); Assistant referees: Renato Faverani (Italy), Andrea Stefani (Italy); Fourth official: Riccardo Di Fiore (Italy); Goal-line assistants: Antonio Damato (Italy), Paolo Valeri (Italy)
