= 2013 Taça da Liga final =

- Event: 2012–13 Taça da Liga
| Braga | Porto |
| 1 | 0 |
- Date: 13 April 2013
- Venue: Estádio Cidade de Coimbra, Coimbra
- Man of the Match: Mossoró (Braga)
- Referee: João Capela
- Attendance: 18,519
- Weather: Clear sky 19 °C (66 °F)

The 2013 Taça da Liga final was the final match of the 2012–13 Taça da Liga, the sixth season of the Taça da Liga. It was played on 13 April 2013 at the Estádio Cidade de Coimbra in Coimbra, between Braga and Porto. Braga won 1–0 to secure their first title in this competition, and the club's third overall.

The competition involved the 32 clubs playing in the top two tiers of the Portuguese football league system – the Primeira Liga and the Segunda Liga – during the 2012–13 season. Reserve sides of Primeira Liga teams which played in the 2012–13 Segunda Liga were excluded from the competition. Braga reached the final for the first time, while this was Porto's second presence, after losing the 2010 final to Benfica.

== Route to the final ==
Note: In all results below, the score of the finalist is given first (H: home; A: away).

| Braga | | | Round | Porto | | |
|---|---|---|---|---|---|---|
| Opponent | Result | Stadium | First round | Opponent | Result | Stadium |
| Bye | | | First round | Bye | | |
| Opponent | Result | Stadium | Second round | Opponent | Result | Stadium |
| Bye | | | Second round | Bye | | |
| Opponent | Result | Stadium | Third round | Opponent | Result | Stadium |
| Vitória de Guimarães | 0–0 (A) | Estádio D. Afonso Henriques | Matchday 1 | Nacional | 2–0 (A) | Estádio da Madeira |
| Naval | 2–1 (A) | Estádio Municipal José Bento Pessoa | Matchday 2 | Estoril | 2–2 (A) | Estádio António Coimbra da Mota |
| Beira-Mar | 3–0 (H) | Estádio Municipal de Braga | Matchday 3 | Vitória de Setúbal | 1–0 (H) | Estádio do Dragão |
| Group B winners: Team / Pld / W / D / L / GF / GA / GD / Pts; Braga / 3 / 2 / 1 / 0 / 5 / 1 / +4 / 7; Vitória de Guimarães / 3 / 1 / 2 / 0 / 3 / 2 / +1 / 5; Beira-Mar / 3 / 0 / 2 / 1 / 2 / 5 / –3 / 2; Naval / 3 / 0 / 1 / 2 / 1 / 3 / −2 / 1 | | | Final standings | Group A winners: Team / Pld / W / D / L / GF / GA / GD / Pts; Porto / 3 / 2 / 1 / 0 / 5 / 2 / +3 / 7; Vitória de Setúbal / 3 / 1 / 1 / 1 / 3 / 2 / +1 / 4; Nacional / 3 / 1 / 0 / 2 / 2 / 5 / –3 / 3; Estoril / 3 / 0 / 2 / 1 / 2 / 3 / –1 / 2 | | |
| Opponent | Result | Stadium | Knockout phase | Opponent | Result | Stadium |
| Benfica | 0–0 (3–2p) (H) | Estádio Municipal de Braga | Semi-finals | Rio Ave | 4–0 (H) | Estádio do Dragão |

=== Braga ===
As a Primeira Liga team, Braga entered the 2012–13 Taça da Liga in the third round. The third round consisted of three group stage matches with the group winner progressing to the semi-finals. Braga were drawn in group B, alongside Primeira Liga sides Vitória de Guimarães, Beira-Mar and Segunda Liga's Naval 1º de Maio. Their opening match was an away goalless draw against Minho rivals Vitória de Guimarães. For their second group stage match, Braga played away at Naval 1º de Maio's Estádio Municipal José Bento Pessoa. Braga defeated the Navalistas 2–1. Naval took an early lead through Paulo Regula, but Braga equalised on 23 minutes through Maximilian Haas. Following the break, Braga manager José Peseiro brought on first-team regulars Eder, Ismaily and Mossoró in an attempt to win the game. Peseiro's substitutions paid off, as Braga were awarded a penalty 11 minutes before the end, after Carlitos fouled Eder in the penalty box. Custódio converted from the spot and gave Braga the three points. Braga's third group stage match was at the Estádio AXA against Beira-Mar. Braga defeated the Auri-negros 3–0. Peseiro's squad selection saw him start several fringe players with little playing time in order to rest some of his first-team regulars. Braga opened the scoring through Carlão, on 37 minutes. Midfielder Ruben Amorim doubled Braga's lead before the break, while Hugo Viana scored in the second half to make it three, thus granting Braga passage into the semi-finals.

In the semi-finals, Braga played host to group D winners Benfica. After a goalless 90 minutes where Braga provided more attacking threat than Benfica, the game was decided by a penalty shoot-out. After each side had taken four penalties each, the score was 3–2 to Braga. Benfica's final penalty taker was Nicolás Gaitán, but as his shot was saved by Quim, Braga emerged victorious and headed to the Taça da Liga final for the first time in their history.

=== Porto ===
Just like their opponents, Porto entered the competition in the third round, where they were drawn into group A alongside Primeira Liga opponents Estoril, Nacional and Vitória de Setúbal. Porto's first group stage game was away against Nacional on 19 December. Porto defeated the Madeiran side 2–0 with goals in each half from Lucho González and Nicolás Otamendi. Porto's second group stage match was an away tie at Estoril's Estádio António Coimbra da Mota. Estoril took the lead on 15 minutes through central defender Steven Vitória. Porto equalised on 31 minutes through Jackson Martínez, who headed the ball past an on-rushing Mário Matos. The Canarinhos retook the lead on the hour mark, after Vitória converted from the penalty spot to double Estoril's goal tally. On the 80th minute, Porto tied the game through João Moutinho, who fired the ball into the top left corner of the goal from 25 yards. Their third and final group stage match was against Vitória de Setúbal on 9 January. Porto defeated the Sadinos 1–0. Moutinho scored the only goal of the game from the penalty spot before half-time, after Sebá had been fouled in the penalty box by Vitória's Nélson Pedroso.

In the semi-finals, Porto hosted Rio Ave. The first half saw the home side dominate possession but not break through Rio Ave's defense. James Rodríguez broke the deadlock from the penalty spot, on 57 minutes. On 72 minutes, Fernando doubled Porto's lead after Steven Defour received the ball on the left wing and found an unmarked Fernando, who slotted the ball into the net. After assisting for Porto's second goal, Defour was assisted by André Castro to score the third. French central defender Eliaquim Mangala closed the scoring in injury time.

== Pre-match ==
=== Officials ===
Match officials were confirmed on 11 April, when João Capela of Lisbon was named the referee for the final. This was the first time that Capela officiated a final of a major competition in Portugal. Capela was assisted by Tiago Rocha and Ricardo Santos, both of Lisbon, while the fourth official was Manuel Mota of Braga.

=== Ticketing ===
Tickets for the final went on sale on 6 April. A third of all tickets had been sold, two days prior to the final. The LPFP allocated tickets for both finalist clubs at a price of €10, while prices for the general public varied between €15 and €25.

=== Venue ===
In November 2012, during the draw for the third round, the LPFP announced that the final would take place at the Estádio Cidade de Coimbra. It was the third consecutive time that it hosted the decisive match of the competition, after the 2011 and 2012 finals. The stadium also hosted the 2004 edition of the Supertaça Cândido de Oliveira, where Porto defeated Benfica 1–0.

The Estádio Cidade de Coimbra is the home stadium of Académica de Coimbra and has a capacity for 30,210 spectators. Between 2001 and 2003, the stadium underwent renovation works as it was selected by the Portuguese Football Federation as one of the host venues for the UEFA Euro 2004. The stadium played host to two group stage matches, when both England and France played against Switzerland.

== Match ==
=== Team selection ===
Braga went into the Taça da Liga final with only center forward Eder missing. Eder had sustained an injury two months prior to the final in the semi-finals of this competition against Benfica, where he ruptured ligaments in his right knee. Braga coach José Peseiro included central defender Douglão in his squad, who had just recuperated from an injury prior to the final; he had been injured since December. The exclusion of Eder from the squad would see the surprise squad selections of reserve team players Aderlan Santos and Mauro. Braga lined up in a 4–2–1–3 formation. Braga's starting line-up saw the surprise start of Aderlan Santos in defence, as well as Rúben Micael being selected ahead of Ruben Amorim in midfield. Carlão would be selected ahead of Zé Luís as a replacement for the injured Eder.

Just like their opponents, Porto were missing several players going into the final. Both Maicon and Héctor Quiñones were unavailable for the game. Maicon had sustained an injury in the buildup to the final, whilst Quiñones was left out of the final squad by Vítor Pereira. Both Eliaquim Mangala and Russian midfielder Marat Izmailov were injury doubts for the game, but recuperated in time for Pereira to include them in the final squad. Apart from the inclusion of Mangala and Izmailov, Pereira also included Brazilian forward Kelvin to be part of the squad. Porto lined up in a 4–1–3–2 formation. Despite Braga playing a strengthened side that had regularly played together in the Primeira Liga, Porto lined up with several fringe players. Pereira's starting eleven saw Fabiano start in goal, Abdoulaye Ba partner Mangala in the centre of defence and Belgian midfielder Steven Defour start on the left wing ahead of Izmailov.

=== Details ===
13 April 2013
19:45

| Braga | 1–0 | Porto |
|---|---|---|
| Alan 45+2' (pen.) |

Estádio Cidade de Coimbra, Coimbra
Attendance: 18,519
Referee: João Capela

| Braga | Porto |

| GK | 1 | (Portugal) Quim | (yellow card) 90+4' |
| RB | 15 | (Brazil) Baiano | (yellow card) 48' |
| CB | 75 | (Brazil) Aderlan Santos |
| CB | 4 | (Portugal) Nuno André Coelho |
| LB | 20 | (Nigeria) Elderson Echiéjilé | (yellow card) 36' |
| DM | 27 | (Portugal) Custódio | (yellow card) 80' |
| DM | 45 | (Portugal) Hugo Viana |
| RW | 30 | (Brazil) Alan (c) |
| CM | 14 | (Portugal) Rúben Micael | | (substituted off) 73' |
| LM | 8 | (Brazil) Mossoró | (yellow card) 67' | (substituted off) 90' |
| CF | 83 | (Brazil) Carlão | | (substituted off) 90' |
Substitutes:
| GK | 24 | (Russia) Stanislav Kritsyuk |
| DF | 44 | (Brazil) Douglão | | (substituted on) 90' |
| MF | 63 | (Brazil) Mauro |
| MF | 5 | (Portugal) Ruben Amorim |
| MF | 14 | (Portugal) João Pedro | | (substituted on) 73' |
| FW | 10 | (Portugal) Hélder Barbosa |
| FW | 29 | (Cape Verde) Zé Luís | | (substituted on) 77' |
Manager:
(Portugal) José Peseiro

| GK | 24 | (Brazil) Fabiano |
| RB | 2 | (Brazil) Danilo |
| CB | 23 | (Senegal) Abdoulaye Ba | (yellow card) 18' (red card) 45+1' |
| CB | 22 | (France) Eliaquim Mangala |
| LB | 26 | (Brazil) Alex Sandro |
| DM | 25 | (Brazil) Fernando |
| CM | 3 | (Argentina) Lucho González (c) | | (substituted off) 45' |
| CM | 8 | (Portugal) João Moutinho |
| RW | 10 | (Colombia) James Rodríguez | | (substituted off) 74' |
| LM | 35 | (Belgium) Steven Defour | | (substituted off) 59' |
| CF | 9 | (Colombia) Jackson Martínez |
Substitutes:
| GK | 1 | (Brazil) Helton |
| DF | 30 | (Argentina) Nicolás Otamendi | | (substituted on) 45' |
| MF | 15 | (Russia) Marat Izmailov |
| MF | 6 | (Portugal) André Castro |
| FW | 27 | (Ghana) Christian Atsu | | (substituted on) 74' |
| FW | 28 | (Brazil) Kelvin | | (substituted on) 59' |
| FW | 19 | (Brazil) Liédson |
Manager:
(Portugal) Vítor Pereira

2012–13 Taça da Liga Winners
Braga
1st Title

Man of the match

- (Brazil) Mossoró (Braga)

Match officials

- Assistant referees:
  - Tiago Rocha (Lisbon)
  - Ricardo Santos (Lisbon)
- Fourth official: Manuel Mota (Braga)

Match rules

- 90 minutes
- Penalty shoot-out if scores level after 90 minutes
- Seven named substitutes
- Maximum of three substitutions

== See also ==
- 2012–13 FC Porto season
- 2013 Taça de Portugal final
