= List of S.C. Braga seasons =

Sporting Clube de Braga is a Portuguese sports club, from the city of Braga. The club was formed in 1921, but they only achieved their first title in the 1965–66 season, by winning the Taça de Portugal. Their football team plays at the Estádio Municipal de Braga, also known as The Quarry, which was built for UEFA Euro 2004.

Domestically, Braga has three Portuguese Cups (in 1965–66, 2015–16 and 2020–21), three Portuguese League Cups (in 2012–13, 2019–20 and 2023–24) and a Portuguese Football Federation Cup (in 1976–77), as well as reaching eight other finals. In the 2000s, the club gradually became one of Portugal's most successful clubs, after the Big Three, and has also competed with success in the European competitions, winning the final edition of the UEFA Intertoto Cup in 2008 and reaching the final of the UEFA Europa League in 2011. After finishing in second place, for the first time, in the 2009–10 Primeira Liga, Braga achieved a place in the 2010–11 UEFA Champions League group stage, also for the first time in their history, by knocking out Celtic and Sevilla in the qualifying rounds. Braga would return to the UEFA Champions League group stage in 2012–13 and 2023–24.

The table below shows the club's performance since its first presence in the second division in the 1942–43 season. This list details the club's achievements in major competitions.

== Key ==
- Div. = Division
- Pos. = Position
- Pld = Matches played
- W = Matches won
- D = Matches drawn
- L = Matches lost
- GF = Goals for
- GA = Goals against
- Pts = Points
- QR = Qualifying round
- Q1 = 1st qualifying round
- Q2 = 2nd qualifying round
- Q3 = 3rd qualifying round
- PO = Play-off round
- KPO = Knockout phase play-offs
- GS = Group stage
- 2nd GS = 2nd group stage
- QF = Quarter-finals
- SF = Semi-finals
- RU = Runner-up
- W = Winner
- R1 = 1st round
- R2 = 2nd round
- R3 = 3rd round
- R4 = 4th round
- R5 = 5th round
- n/a = competition not yet started or cancelled
Winners / 1st Place
Runners-up / 2nd Place
Semi-finals / 3rd Place

== Seasons (1975–present) ==
Season	League									Cup	League Cup	Europe		Other Competitions		Notes
Season	Div.	Pos.	Pld	W	D	L	GF	GA	Pts	Result	Result	Competition	Result	Competition	Result	Notes
1975–76	1st	7th	30	9	10	11	35	43	28	R4	n/a	-	-	-	-	
1976–77	1st	8th	30	10	9	11	36	36	29	RU	n/a	-	-	FPF Cup	W	
1977–78	1st	4th	30	16	6	8	42	27	38	SF	n/a	-	-	-	-	
1978–79	1st	4th	30	16	5	9	49	35	37	SF	n/a	UEFA Cup	R2	-	-	
1979–80	1st	9th	30	10	6	14	34	40	26	R3	n/a	-	-	-	-	
1980–81	1st	6th	30	10	10	10	34	39	30	QF	n/a	-	-	-	-	
1981–82	1st	7th	30	11	8	11	34	42	30	RU	n/a	-	-	-	-	
1982–83	1st	6th	30	13	3	14	41	43	29	QF	n/a	UEFA Cup Winners' Cup	PR	Supertaça	RU	
1983–84	1st	4th	30	15	7	8	40	32	37	R4	n/a	-	-	-	-	
1984–85	1st	8th	30	9	10	11	46	43	28	R5	n/a	UEFA Cup	R1	-	-	
1985–86	1st	9th	30	9	8	13	34	47	26	SF	n/a	-	-	-	-	
1986–87	1st	9th	30	10	6	14	32	34	26	R3	n/a	-	-	-	-	
1987–88	1st	11th	38	8	18	12	32	42	34	R5	n/a	-	-	-	-	
1988–89	1st	6th	38	14	12	12	42	37	40	SF	n/a	-	-	-	-	
1989–90	1st	12th	34	8	12	14	32	41	28	R4	n/a	-	-	-	-	
1990–91	1st	7th	38	13	8	17	42	45	34	QF	n/a	-	-	-	-	
1991–92	1st	12th	34	12	5	17	41	49	29	QF	n/a	-	-	-	-	
1992–93	1st	12th	34	12	6	16	33	34	30	QF	n/a	-	-	-	-	
1993–94	1st	15th	34	9	10	15	33	43	28	R4	n/a	-	-	-	-	
1994–95	1st	10th	34	11	10	13	34	42	32	R5	n/a	-	-	-	-	
1995–96	1st	8th	34	12	9	3	44	47	45	R3	n/a	-	-	-	-	
1996–97	1st	4th	34	15	10	9	39	40	55	QF	n/a	-	-	-	-	
1997–98	1st	10th	34	11	12	11	48	49	45	RU	n/a	UEFA Cup	R3	-	-	
1998–99	1st	9th	34	10	12	12	38	50	42	R3	n/a	UEFA Cup Winners' Cup	R2	Supertaça	RU	
1999–2000	1st	9th	34	12	7	15	44	45	43	R4	n/a	-	-	-	-	
2000–01	1st	4th	34	16	9	9	58	48	57	R3	n/a	-	-	-	-	
2001–02	1st	10th	34	10	12	12	43	43	42	SF	n/a	-	-	-	-	
2002–03	1st	14th	34	8	14	12	34	47	38	Last 32	n/a	-	-	-	-	
2003–04	1st	5th	34	15	9	10	36	38	54	SF	n/a	-	-	-	-	
2004–05	1st	4th	34	16	10	8	45	28	58	QF	n/a	UEFA Cup	R1	-	-	
2005–06	1st	4th	34	17	7	10	38	22	58	Last 32	n/a	UEFA Cup	R1	-	-	
2006–07	1st	4th	30	14	8	8	35	30	50	SF	n/a	UEFA Cup	Last 16	-	-	
2007–08	1st	7th	30	10	11	9	32	34	41	Last 16	R3	UEFA Cup	Last 32	-	-	
2008–09	1st	5th	30	13	11	6	38	21	50	Last 32	R2	UEFA Cup	Last 16	UEFA Intertoto Cup	W	^{[A]}
2009–10	1st	2nd	30	22	5	3	48	20	71	QF	R3	UEFA Europa League	Q3	-	-	^{[B]}
2010–11	1st	4th	30	13	7	10	45	33	46	Last 32	R3	UEFA Europa League	RU	-	-	^{[C]}^{[D]}^{[G]}
2011–12	1st	3rd	30	19	5	6	59	29	62	Last 32	SF	UEFA Europa League	Last 32	-	-	
2012–13	1st	4th	30	16	4	10	60	44	52	QF	W	UEFA Champions League	GS	-	-	
2013–14	1st	9th	30	10	7	13	39	37	37	SF	SF	UEFA Europa League	PO	-	-	
2014–15	1st	4th	34	17	7	10	55	28	58	RU	R3	-	-	-	-	-
2015–16	1st	4th	34	16	10	8	54	35	58	W	SF	UEFA Europa League	QF	-	-	-
2016–17	1st	5th	34	15	9	10	51	36	54	Last 16	RU	UEFA Europa League	GS	Supertaça	RU	-
2017–18	1st	4th	34	24	3	7	74	29	75	Last 32	R3	UEFA Europa League	Last 32	-	-	
2018–19	1st	4th	34	21	4	9	56	37	67	SF	SF	UEFA Europa League	Q3	-	-	
2019–20	1st	3rd	34	18	6	10	61	40	60	Last 16	W	UEFA Europa League	Last 32	-	-	
2020–21	1st	4th	34	19	7	8	53	33	64	W	RU	UEFA Europa League	Last 32	-	-	
2021–22	1st	4th	34	19	8	7	52	31	65	Last 16	R3	UEFA Europa League	QF	Supertaça	RU	
2022–23	1st	3rd	34	25	3	6	75	30	78	RU	QF	UEFA Europa League UEFA Europa Conference League	GS KPO	-	-	^{[E]}
2023–24	1st	4th	34	21	5	8	71	50	68	Last 16	W	UEFA Champions League UEFA Europa League	GS KPO	-	-	^{[F]}
2024–25	1st	4th	34	19	9	6	55	30	66	QF	SF	UEFA Europa League	LP	-	-	
2025–26	1st	4th	34	16	11	7	64	36	59	QF	RU	UEFA Europa League	SF	-	-	

A. Braga started season in the 2008 UEFA Intertoto Cup and then qualified for the 2008–09 UEFA Cup.
B. Best league finish.
C. First presence in the UEFA Champions League.
D. Braga started season in the 2010–11 UEFA Champions League and later joined UEFA Europa League after finishing 3rd in the group stage.
E. Braga started season in the 2022–23 UEFA Europa League and later joined UEFA Europa Conference League after finishing 3rd in the group stage.
F. Braga started season in the 2023–24 UEFA Champions League and later joined UEFA Europa League after finishing 3rd in the group stage.
G. Best European competition finish.

Last updated: 16 May 2026

== All seasons ==
Season	Div.	Pos.	Pld	W	D	L	GF	GA	Pts	Cup	League Cup	Europe		Notes
1942–43	2DN	1	14	11	2	1	47	13	24					
1943–44	2DN	4	12	5	1	6	29	16	11					
1944–45	2DN	2	8	6	1	1	33	13	13					
1945–46	2DN	2	10	7	1	2	37	19	15					
1946–47	2DN	1	10	9	0	1	48	12	18	Not held				Second Division Championship Play-off Winner (Champion and Promoted)
1947–48	1	13	26	6	4	16	47	69	16	Round of 16				
1948–49	1	8	26	11	2	13	39	54	24	Quarter-finals				
1949–50	1	8	26	11	2	13	52	53	24	Not held				
1950–51	1	7	26	10	5	11	42	57	25	Round of 16				
1951–52	1	8	26	8	5	13	32	49	21	Round of 16				
1952–53	1	13	26	8	2	16	37	58	18	Round of 16				
1953–54	1	5	26	12	4	10	54	36	28	Round of 16				
1954–55	1	5	26	12	5	9	52	42	29	Quarter-finals				
1955–56	1	14	26	5	3	18	36	84	13	Quarter-finals				Relegated
1956–57	2DN	1	26	18	2	6	81	25	38					Second Division Championship Play-off Runner-up (Promoted)
1957–58	1	5	26	9	7	10	51	52	25	Round of 16				
1958–59	1	7	26	9	6	11	48	51	24	Quarter-finals				
1959–60	1	12	26	6	8	12	24	39	20	Round of 16				
1960–61	1	13	26	8	3	15	41	62	19	Round of 16				Relegated
1961–62	2DN	2	26	17	4	5	57	27	38	Round of 64				
1962–63	2DN	4	26	14	4	8	51	40	32	Round of 64				
1963–64	2DN	1	26	19	2	5	66	31	40	Round of 32				Second Division Championship Play-off Winner (Champion and Promoted)
1964–65	1	10	26	8	4	14	36	51	20	Semi-finals				
1965–66	1	10	26	7	7	12	39	64	21	Winner				Portuguese Cup Winner
1966–67	1	9	26	9	5	12	33	33	23	Semi-finals		CWC	Round of 16	First presence in the European Cup Winners' Cup (debut in European competitions)
1967–68	1	9	26	9	3	14	29	48	21	Round of 16				
1968–69	1	12	26	6	7	13	20	47	19	Round of 64				
1969–70	1	13	26	6	5	15	25	52	17	Quarter-finals				Relegated
1970–71	2DN	7	26	13	2	11	51	39	28	Round of 64				"Ribeiro dos Reis" Cup Runner-up
1971–72	2DN	7	30	12	6	12	33	35	30	Round of 128				
1972–73	2DN	3	30	11	12	7	36	22	34	Round of 32				
1973–74	2DN	8	38	16	10	12	48	32	42	Round of 64				
1974–75	2DN	1	38	19	12	7	44	25	50	Quarter-finals				Second Division Championship Play-off Runner-up (Promoted)
1975–76	1	7	30	9	10	11	35	43	28	Round of 32				
1976–77	1	8	30	10	9	11	36	36	29	Runner-up				Portuguese Football Federation Cup Winner
1977–78	1	4	30	16	6	8	42	27	38	Semi-finals				
1978–79	1	4	30	16	5	9	49	35	37	Semi-finals		UC	Round of 32	First presence in the UEFA Cup
1979–80	1	9	30	10	6	14	34	40	26	Round of 64				
1980–81	1	6	30	10	10	10	34	39	30	Quarter-finals				
1981–82	1	7	30	11	8	11	34	42	30	Runner-up				
1982–83	1	6	30	13	3	14	41	43	29	Quarter-finals		CWC	Preliminary round	1982 Portuguese Super Cup Runner-up
1983–84	1	4	30	15	7	8	40	32	37	Round of 32				
1984–85	1	8	30	9	10	11	46	43	28	Round of 16		UC	1st round	
1985–86	1	9	30	9	8	13	34	47	26	Semi-finals				
1986–87	1	9	30	10	6	14	32	34	26	Round of 64				
1987–88	1	11	38	8	18	12	32	42	34	Round of 16				
1988–89	1	6	38	14	12	12	42	37	40	Semi-finals				
1989–90	1	12	34	8	12	14	32	41	28	Round of 32				
1990–91	1	7	38	13	8	17	42	45	34	Quarter-finals				
1991–92	1	11	34	12	5	17	41	49	29	Quarter-finals				
1992–93	1	12	34	12	6	16	33	34	30	Quarter-finals				
1993–94	1	15	34	9	10	15	33	43	28	Round of 32				
1994–95	1	10	34	11	10	13	34	42	32	Round of 16				
1995–96	1	8	34	12	9	3	44	47	45	Round of 64				
1996–97	1	4	34	15	10	9	39	40	55	Quarter-finals				
1997–98	1	10	34	11	12	11	48	49	45	Runner-up		UC	Round of 16	
1998–99	1	9	34	10	12	12	38	50	42	Round of 64		CWC	Round of 16	1998 Portuguese Super Cup Runner-up
1999–2000	1	9	34	12	7	15	44	45	43	Round of 32				
2000–01	1	4	34	16	9	9	58	48	57	Round of 64				
2001–02	1	10	34	10	12	12	43	43	42	Semi-finals				
2002–03	1	14	34	8	14	12	34	47	38	Round of 32				
2003–04	1	5	34	15	9	10	36	38	54	Semi-finals				
2004–05	1	4	34	16	10	8	45	28	58	Quarter-finals		UC	1st round	
2005–06	1	4	34	17	7	10	38	22	58	Round of 32		UC	1st round	
2006–07	1	4	30	14	8	8	35	30	50	Semi-finals		UC	Round of 16	
2007–08	1	7	30	10	11	9	32	34	41	Round of 32	3rd round	UC	Round of 32	
2008–09	1	5	30	13	11	6	38	21	50	Round of 32	2nd round	IC^{1}	Winner	UEFA Intertoto Cup Winner
2008–09	1	5	30	13	11	6	38	21	50	Round of 32	2nd round	UC^{1}	Round of 16	UEFA Intertoto Cup Winner
2009–10	1	2	30	22	5	3	48	20	71	Quarter-finals	3rd round	EL	3rd qualifying	Best league finish
2010–11	1	4	30	13	7	10	45	33	46	Round of 32	3rd round	CL^{2}	Group stage	First presence in the UEFA Champions League
2010–11	1	4	30	13	7	10	45	33	46	Round of 32	3rd round	EL^{2}	Runner-up	Best European competition finish
2011–12	1	3	30	19	5	6	59	29	62	Round of 32	Semi-finals	EL	Round of 32	
2012–13	1	4	30	16	4	10	60	44	52	Quarter-finals	Winner	CL	Group stage	Portuguese League Cup Winner
2013–14	1	9	30	10	7	13	39	37	37	Semi-finals	Semi-finals	EL	Play-off round	
2014–15	1	4	34	17	7	10	55	28	58	Runner-up	3rd round			
2015–16	1	4	34	16	10	8	54	35	58	Winner	Semi-finals	EL	Quarter-finals	Portuguese Cup Winner
2016–17	1	5	34	15	9	10	51	36	54	Round of 16	Runner-up	EL	Group stage	2016 Portuguese SuperCup runner-up
2017–18	1	4	34	24	3	7	74	29	75	Round of 32	3rd round	EL	Round of 32	
2018–19	1	4	34	21	4	9	56	37	67	Semi-finals	Semi-finals	EL	3rd qualifying	
2019–20	1	3	34	18	6	10	61	40	60	Round of 16	Winner	EL	Round of 32	Portuguese League Cup Winner
2020–21	1	4	34	19	7	8	53	33	64	Winner	Runner-up	EL	Round of 32	Portuguese Cup Winner
2021–22	1	4	34	19	8	7	52	31	65	Round of 16	3rd round	EL	Quarter-finals	2021 Portuguese SuperCup runner-up
2022–23	1	3	34	25	3	6	75	30	78	Runner-up	Quarter-finals	EL^{3}	Group stage	First presence in the UEFA Europa Conference League
2022–23	1	3	34	25	3	6	75	30	78	Runner-up	Quarter-finals	ECL^{3}	Knockout round play-offs	First presence in the UEFA Europa Conference League
2023–24	1	4	34	21	5	8	71	50	68	Round of 16	Winner	CL^{4}	Group stage	Portuguese League Cup Winner
2023–24	1	4	34	21	5	8	71	50	68	Round of 16	Winner	EL^{4}	Knockout round play-offs	Portuguese League Cup Winner
2024–25	1	4	34	19	9	6	55	30	66	Quarter-finals	Semi-finals	EL	League phase	
2025–26	1	4	34	16	11	7	64	36	59	Quarter-finals	Runner-up	EL	Semi-finals	

Last updated: 16 May 2026
^{1} Braga started season in the IC and then qualified for the UC.
^{2} Braga started season in the CL and later joined EL after finishing 3rd in the group stage.
^{3} Braga started season in the EL and later joined ECL after finishing 3rd in the group stage.
^{4} Braga started season in the CL and later joined EL after finishing 3rd in the group stage.
Div. = Division; 1 = Portuguese League; 2DN = Second Division North; Pos. = Position; Pl = Match played; W = Win; D = Draw; L = Lost; GS = Goal scored; GA = Goal against; P = Points
CL = UEFA Champions League; CWC = UEFA Cup Winners' Cup; UC = UEFA Cup; EL = UEFA Europa League; ECL = UEFA Europa Conference League; IC = UEFA Intertoto Cup.
