= Rafael Porcellis =

Brazilian footballer

Personal information
- Full name: Rafael Porcellis de Oliveira
- Date of birth: 19 January 1987 (age 39)
- Place of birth: Porto Alegre, Brazil
- Height: 1.87 m (6 ft 2 in)
- Position: Striker

Youth career
- 2002–2006: Internacional

Senior career*
Years	Team	Apps	(Gls)
2006–2009	Internacional		
2007	→ Santa Cruz (loan)		
2007	Internacional B		
2008	→ Toledo (loan)		
2009	→ Brasil de Pelotas (loan)		
2009	→ Campinense (loan)		
2009–2011	Helsingborgs IF	13	(0)
2011	→ IFK Värnamo (loan)	9	(0)
2011–2012	Fátima	27	(19)
2012–2013	Santa Clara	38	(13)
2013–2014	Braga	0	(0)
2013–2014	→ Feirense (loan)	28	(9)
2014–2015	Zawisza Bydgoszcz	8	(0)
2015	Korona Kielce	15	(3)
2015–2016	Feirense	23	(5)
2016–2017	União da Madeira	19	(1)
2017	Leixões	21	(9)
2017	Al-Arabi		
2018	São José		

International career
- Brazil U18
- * Club domestic league appearances and goals

Rafael Porcellis de Oliveira (born 19 January 1987) is a Brazilian former professional footballer who played as a striker.

== Club career ==
He is known for his striking abilities and has scored more than 80 goals in around 120 matches for SC Internacional youth teams, though he played only one game in the senior side. In July 2009, he signed for Helsingborgs IF.

In the summer of 2011, Porcellis was released by Helsingborgs IF. Following his release from the Swedish side, he went on trial with Portuguese first division side União de Leiria. After several weeks on trial, União de Leiria decided not to sign him on a permanent basis. On 30 August 2011, he signed with Portuguese third division side Fátima.

In the summer of 2012, Porcellis left Fátima for Santa Clara after scoring 19 league goals in the 2011–12 season. Porcellis made his Santa Clara debut on 29 July 2012 in the inaugural group stage match of the 2012–13 Taça da Liga. The following week saw Porcellis score a hat-trick on his home ground debut against Trofense, in which his three goals helped his side seal a 5–0 victory. He followed up his hat-trick with two goals in the final League cup group stage match against Desportivo das Aves. Falcao made his Segunda Liga debut against Naval 1º de Maio on 12 August, where he managed to score a brace, which gave his side a 3–1 victory. His stay with the Ponta Delgada club would prove to be successful as he finished the 2012–13 season as the club's top goalscorer with 21 goals.

Prior to the end of the 2012–13 season, Primeira Liga side Braga announced that Porcellis would join the Arsenalistas on 1 July 2013. The arrival of Jesualdo Ferreira as manager, would see the arrival of forward players Edinho, Felipe Pardo, Hugo Vieira and Salvador Agra which would limit his playing time which resulted him being loaned out on a seasons long loan to second division side Feirense.

== International career ==
Porcellis earned a call-up to the Brazilian under-18 side in 2005.

== Career statistics ==
As of 1 April 2014

Appearances and goals by club, season and competition
Club	Season	League		National cup		League cup		Europe		Total	
Club	Season	Apps	Goals	Apps	Goals	Apps	Goals	Apps	Goals	Apps	Goals
Fátima	2011–12	27	19	0	0	0	0	0	0	27	19
Santa Clara	2012–13	38	13	1	1	5	5	0	0	44	19
Braga	2013–14	0	0	0	0	0	0	0	0	0	0
Feirense	2013–14	28	9	1	1	0	0	0	0	29	10
Career total		93	41	2	2	5	5	0	0	100	48

== Honours ==
Helsingborgs IF

- Svenska Cupen: 2010
