= Leandro Salino =

Brazilian footballer

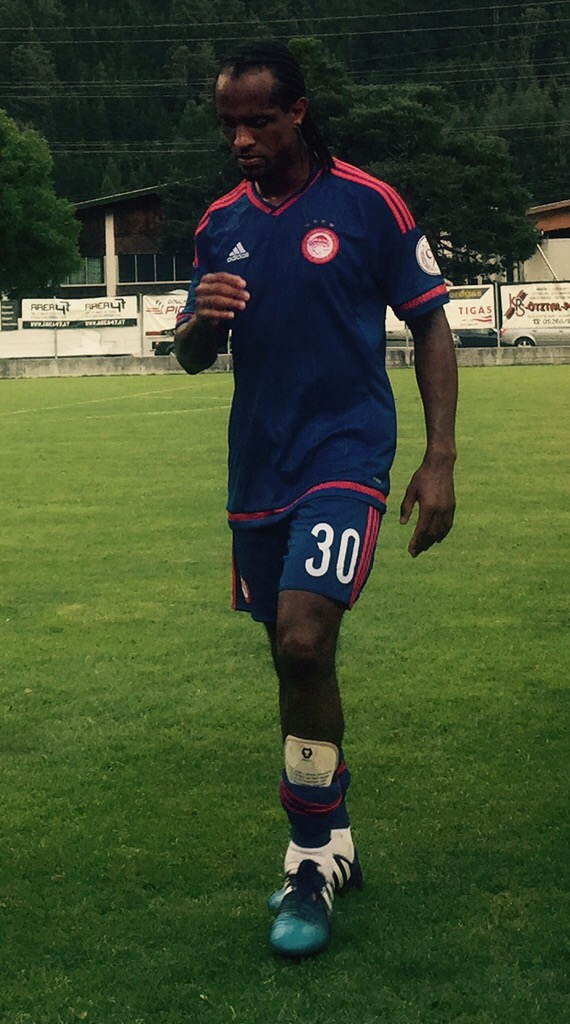
- Salino with Olympiacos in 2015

Personal information
- Full name: Leandro Salino do Carmo
- Date of birth: 22 April 1985 (age 41)
- Place of birth: Juiz de Fora, Brazil
- Height: 1.70 m (5 ft 7 in)
- Positions: Right back; defensive midfielder

Youth career
- 2003: Cruzeiro

Senior career*
| Years | Team | Apps | (Gls) |
| 2004–2005 | América-MG | | |
| 2005 | → Ipatinga (loan) | | |
| 2005–2006 | Nacional | 0 | (0) |
| 2006 | → Camacha (loan) | 2 | (0) |
| 2006 | → Ipatinga (loan) | 32 | (0) |
| 2007–2008 | Flamengo | 0 | (0) |
| 2008 | → Ipatinga (loan) | 32 | (0) |
| 2009–2010 | Nacional | 37 | (0) |
| 2010–2013 | Braga | 60 | (3) |
| 2013–2016 | Olympiacos | 43 | (0) |
| 2017 | Vitória | 7 | (0) |
| 2018 | Santa Cruz | 4 | (0) |
| 2018 | Botafogo-SP | 10 | (0) |
| 2019 | Tupynambás | 11 | (2) |
| 2019 | Joinville | 6 | (0) |
| 2019 | Barra | 0 | (0) |
| 2019–2020 | Uberlândia | 7 | (0) |
| 2020 | Ipatinga | 0 | (0) |
| 2020–2021 | União Luziense | 0 | (0) |
| 2021 | Pouso Alegre | 13 | (0) |
| 2021 | Betim | 0 | (0) |
| 2021 | Boa | 1 | (0) |
| 2021–2022 | Coimbra | 0 | (0) |
| 2022 | → Villa Nova (loan) | 12 | (0) |
| Total | | 245 | (3) |
- * Club domestic league appearances and goals as of 25 March 2022

Leandro Salino do Carmo (born 22 April 1985) is a Brazilian former professional footballer who played as a right back.

== Club career ==
=== Early years and Portugal ===
Salino was born in Juiz de Fora, Minas Gerais. In his country, after starting out at América Futebol Clube (MG), he represented mainly Ipatinga Esporte Clube, appearing for the club in all three major levels of Brazilian football.

In 2008, Salino only missed six league matches for Ipatinga, but his team ranked last in Série A. During the 2009 January transfer window he moved to Portugal, signing with C.D. Nacional. He made his Primeira Liga debut on 1 February, starting in a 0–0 home draw against Leixões SC, and contributed with 23 scoreless appearances in his first full season as the Madeirans ranked in seventh position, adding eight games in the UEFA Europa League.

On 9 June 2010, Salino agreed to a three-year deal with fellow league side S.C. Braga. He played 38 matches all competitions comprised in his first year, but was an unused substitute in the final of the Europa League, a 0–1 loss against another Portuguese team, FC Porto, at the Dublin Arena.

Salino scored his first ever goal in the league on 13 August 2010, netting his team's last in a 3–1 home victory over Portimonense. In 2012–13, he was used more often than not as right back by new manager José Peseiro.

=== Olympiacos ===
On 9 July 2013, Salino signed a three-year contract with Greek champions Olympiacos. In matchday six of the UEFA Champions League he was included in the "Team of the week" alongside teammate Javier Saviola, as his team secured progression to the knockout stages with a 3–1 home win against R.S.C. Anderlecht.

On 25 February 2014, Salino played the full 90 minutes in Olympiacos's historic 2–0 round-of-16 first-leg defeat of Manchester United in Piraeus. He also featured in the second match, being booked in a 0–3 loss as Robin van Persie scored all of the opposition's goals. In his debut season he helped his new club to its 41st Super League title, the championship being sealed with five fixtures remaining.

=== Vitória ===
On 24 December 2016, Salino returned to his homeland after eight years after signing a one-year contract with Esporte Clube Vitória.

== Personal life ==
Salino's twin brother, Léo, was also a footballer and a defensive midfielder.

== Honours ==
Ipatinga

- Campeonato Mineiro: 2005

Flamengo

- Taça Guanabara: 2007
- Campeonato Carioca: 2007

Braga

- Taça da Liga: 2012–13
- UEFA Europa League runner-up: 2010–11

Olympiacos

- Super League Greece: 2013–14, 2014–15, 2015–16
- Greek Football Cup: 2014–15
