= Djamal Mahamat =

Libyan footballer (born 1983)

Personal information
- Full name: Djamal Abdoulaye Mahamat Bindi
- Date of birth: 26 April 1983 (age 43)
- Place of birth: Tripoli, Libya
- Height: 1.88 m (6 ft 2 in)
- Position: Midfielder

Youth career
- 1998–2001: Almahalla Tripoli

Senior career*
Years	Team	Apps	(Gls)
2001–2003	Salgueiros	0	(0)
2003–2004	Stade Montois	22	(0)
2004–2005	Bayonne	33	(4)
2005–2006	L'Entente	31	(0)
2006–2007	Estoril	24	(1)
2007–2008	L'Entente	0	(0)
2008–2011	Beira-Mar	68	(4)
2011–2014	Braga	24	(0)
2015–2016	Gil Vicente	41	(5)

International career^{‡}
2011–2013	Libya	16	(2)
- * Club domestic league appearances and goals as of 15 May 2016 ‡ National team caps and goals as of 14 August 2013

Djamal Abdoulaye Mahamat Bindi (Arabic: جمال عبدولاي محمد بيندي; born 26 April 1983), known as Mahamat, is a Libyan footballer who plays as a defensive midfielder and has also represented the Libya national team.

== Club career ==
After an unassuming spell with S.C. Salgueiros in Portugal (no appearances), Mahamat moved to France and remained in the country for four of the five following years, playing exclusively in amateur football and mainly with L'Entente SSG. In the 2006–07 season, aged 23, he made his professional debuts, appearing for and G.D. Estoril Praia in the Portuguese second division.

In November 2007, Mahamat had unsuccessful trials in England with Hartlepool United and Bradford City. In the 2008 summer he returned from the French lower leagues and signed for S.C. Beira-Mar, also in the Portuguese second level. After a weak first year – 15 games – he became an undisputed first-choice for the Aveiro club.

Mahamat made his Primeira Liga debut on 15 August 2010, playing 90 minutes in a 0–0 home draw against U.D. Leiria, and scoring three goals as Beira-Mar eventually retained their status. In May 2011, just weeks after the season ended, he was purchased by fellow league side S.C. Braga for an undisclosed fee; on 1 June 2011 his transfer was confirmed, with the player signing a four-year contract and reuniting with Beira-Mar boss Leonardo Jardim.

== International career ==
Mahamat was first called up by Libya in 2010 by Marcos Paquetá. Since then, he featured regularly for the national team, helping it qualify to the 2012 Africa Cup of Nations, and being selected for the 23-men squad for the finals in Equatorial Guinea and Gabon.

=== International goals ===
As of 3 September 2011 (Libya score listed first, score column indicates score after each Mahamat goal)

No	Date	Venue	Opponent	Score	Result	Competition
1.	28 March 2011	26 Mars, Bamako, Mali	Comoros	3–0	3–0	2012 Africa Cup of Nations qualification
2.	3 September 2011	Petro Sport, Cairo, Egypt	Mozambique	1–0	1–0	2012 Africa Cup of Nations qualification

== Personal life ==
Mahamat's father was also a footballer. He played for the Libyan national team from 1977 to 1986.

== Honours ==
Braga

- Taça da Liga: 2012–13
