= Rúben Micael =

Portuguese footballer

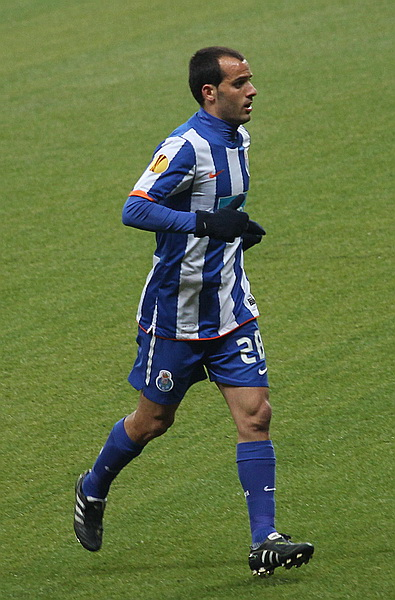
- Micael with Porto in 2010

Personal information
- Full name: Rúben Micael Freitas da Ressureição
- Date of birth: 19 August 1986 (age 40)
- Place of birth: Câmara de Lobos, Portugal
- Height: 1.76 m (5 ft 9 in)
- Position: Midfielder

Youth career
- 1994–1999: Estreito
- 1999–2004: União Madeira

Senior career*
Years	Team	Apps	(Gls)
2004–2008	União Madeira	92	(4)
2008–2010	Nacional	42	(6)
2010–2011	Porto	30	(0)
2011–2013	Atlético Madrid	0	(0)
2011–2012	→ Zaragoza (loan)	33	(0)
2012–2013	→ Braga (loan)	19	(4)
2013–2015	Braga	46	(7)
2015–2017	Shijiazhuang Ever Bright	38	(4)
2017	→ Maccabi Tel Aviv (loan)	15	(1)
2018	Paços Ferreira	13	(1)
2018–2019	Vitória Setúbal	26	(0)
2019–2021	Nacional	53	(1)
Total		407	(28)

International career
2009	Portugal B	1	(0)
2011–2013	Portugal	16	(2)
Medal record
Men's football
Representing Portugal
UEFA European Championship
Bronze medal – third place	2012 Poland-Ukraine
- * Club domestic league appearances and goals

Rúben Micael Freitas da Ressureição (born 19 August 1986), known as Micael, is a Portuguese former professional footballer who played as a midfielder.

He totalled 206 Primeira Liga games and 19 goals over ten seasons, representing Nacional, Porto, Braga, Paços de Ferreira and Vitória de Setúbal, winning seven major honours with the second team and a further one with the third. He also had spells in Spain, China and Israel.

A full Portugal international since 2011, Micael was part of the squad at Euro 2012.

== Club career ==
=== Early years and Nacional ===
Born in Câmara de Lobos, Madeira, Micael started his career with local C.F. União, making his professional debut at the age of 17. For the 2008–09 season, he moved across the island to sign with Primeira Liga club C.D. Nacional.

In that first year, in which Nacional qualified for the UEFA Europa League, Micael, almost never an undisputed starter, featured heavily, scoring notably in a 3–1 home win against S.L. Benfica on 2 May 2009. The previous month, he played for Portugal B in a 2–0 victory over Romania.

Micael started the 2009–10 campaign established in the side's starting XI, notably netting twice against FC Zenit Saint Petersburg in the Europa League's last qualifying round, first in the 4–3 home win then adding a last-minute goal in Russia for the 1–1 draw.

=== Porto ===
In mid-January 2010, FC Porto purchased 60% of Micael's playing rights for a €3 million transfer fee, signing him to a four-and-a-half-year deal and setting his release clause at €30 million. His first league game for his new club came on 30 January, where he started in the place of the suspended Raul Meireles in a 4–0 away defeat of his former team, Nacional.

In 2010–11, Micael was used sparingly by new manager André Villas-Boas. Nonetheless, he still appeared in 36 official matches and totalled 871 minutes of action (four goals, three in the Europa League campaign) as the team won the treble.

=== Atlético Madrid ===
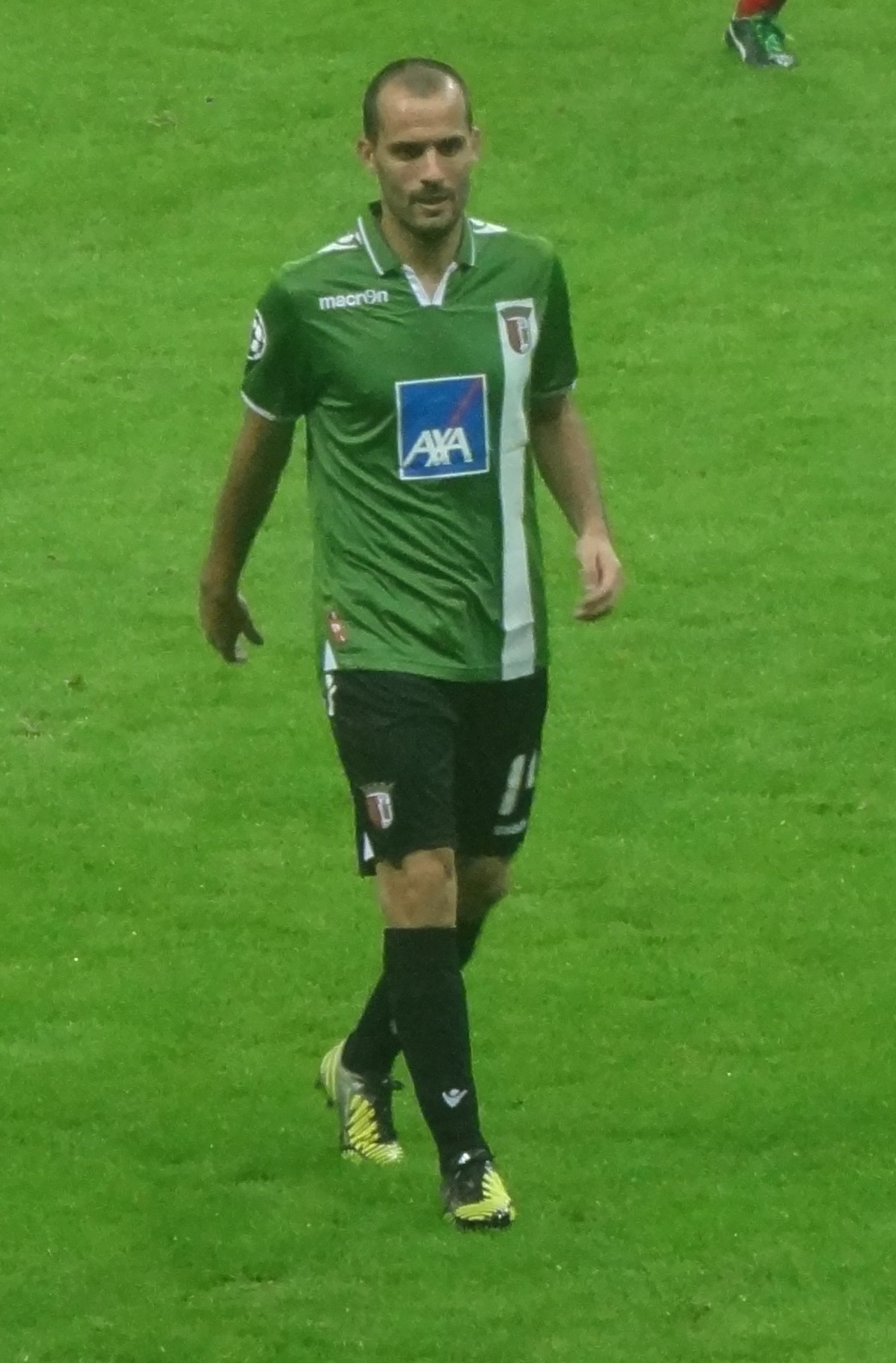
Micael with Braga in October 2012

On 18 August 2011, Micael and Porto teammate Radamel Falcao were both purchased by Atlético Madrid for €45 million – the former for €5 million, although Porto later confirmed that his sale did not generate any revenue for the club. The midfielder was then immediately loaned to fellow La Liga side Real Zaragoza, for a fee of €750,000. 23 of his appearances were as a starter, as his team narrowly avoided relegation.

Micael was loaned to S.C. Braga for 2012–13, starting the year in impressive fashion: in two games separated by only three days in late August, he scored three goals, starting with a brace in a 3–1 home victory against S.C. Beira-Mar then netting the 1–1 equaliser at Udinese Calcio in the UEFA Champions League last qualifying round. In the latter match, he rounded up his performance by converting the decisive penalty in the shootout to help his team reach the group stage for the second time in their history.

Micael continued his strong displays in the Champions League group phase, scoring the first goal in an eventual 2–0 away win over Galatasaray SK in the second round. On 20 October 2012, Atlético sold 50% of his economic rights to Braga for €3 million.

=== Shijiazhuang ===
In June 2015, Micael signed for Shijiazhuang Ever Bright FC. He made his Chinese Super League debut on 4 July, as a substitute in a goalless home draw against Changchun Yatai FC. He totalled 11 games over the season, and scored to open a 3–1 loss at Shandong Luneng Taishan F.C. on 31 October.

After his team was relegated in 2016, Micael was linked with a move to Rangers of the Scottish Premiership. On 2 February 2017, he was loaned to Maccabi Tel Aviv F.C. for the remainder of the campaign. He scored his first goal for the side on 18 March 2017, in a 3–0 home win against Bnei Sakhnin FC.

=== Return to Portugal ===
On 16 January 2018, Micael returned to Portugal's top flight, signing for F.C. Paços de Ferreira until 2021. In June, however, he switched to a one-year deal at Vitória F.C. under his former Maccabi manager Lito Vidigal.

At the end of his contract in Setúbal, Micael returned to Nacional after nine years away; the 33-year-old was their first signing, following relegation in May 2019. Two years later, having experienced another promotion and relegation, he announced his retirement.

== International career ==
On 29 March 2011, Micael made his debut for Portugal, starting and scoring twice in a 2–0 friendly victory over Finland in Aveiro. He was chosen by coach Paulo Bento for UEFA Euro 2012 in Poland and Ukraine, but played no matches for the semi-finalists.

== Career statistics ==
=== Club ===
Appearances and goals by club, season and competition
Club	Season	League			National Cup		League Cup		Europe		Other		Total	
Club	Season	Division	Apps	Goals	Apps	Goals	Apps	Goals	Apps	Goals	Apps	Goals	Apps	Goals
União Madeira	2003–04	Segunda Liga	6	0	0	0	—		—		—		6	0
União Madeira	2004–05	Segunda Divisão	23	0	0	0	—		—		—		23	0
União Madeira	2005–06	Segunda Divisão	4	0	0	0	—		—		—		4	0
União Madeira	2006–07	Segunda Divisão	23	0	3	1	—		—		2 (Note: Appearances in Segunda Divisão promotion play-offs)	0	28	1
União Madeira	2007–08	Segunda Divisão	36	4	1	0	—		—		—		37	4
União Madeira	Total		92	4	4	1	—		—		2	0	98	5
Nacional	2008–09	Primeira Liga	26	4	5	0	4	1	—		—		35	5
Nacional	2009–10	Primeira Liga	16	2	2	1	1	0	8	7	—		27	10
Nacional	Total		42	6	7	1	5	1	8	7	—		62	15
Porto	2009–10	Primeira Liga	10	0	3	2	3	0	2	0	—		18	2
Porto	2010–11	Primeira Liga	19	0	6	0	3	1	8	3	—		36	4
Porto	2011–12	Primeira Liga	1	0	0	0	0	0	0	0	1 (Note: Appearance in Supertaça Cândido de Oliveira)	0	2	0
Porto	Total		30	0	9	2	6	1	10	3	1	0	56	6
Zaragoza (loan)	2011–12	La Liga	33	0	0	0	—		—		—		33	0
Braga (loan)	2012–13	Primeira Liga	19	4	3	1	1	0	7	2	—		30	7
Braga	2013–14	Primeira Liga	21	1	3	0	1	0	2	0	—		27	1
Braga	2014–15	Primeira Liga	25	6	5	1	0	0	—		—		30	7
Braga	Total		46	7	8	1	1	0	2	0	—		57	8
Shijiazhuang Ever Bright	2015	Chinese Super League	11	1	0	0	—		—		—		11	1
Shijiazhuang Ever Bright	2016	Chinese Super League	27	3	0	0	—		—		—		27	3
Shijiazhuang Ever Bright	Total		38	4	0	0	—		—		—		38	4
Maccabi Tel Aviv (loan)	2016–17	Israeli Premier League	15	1	4	0	0	0	0	0	—		19	1
Paços Ferreira	2017–18	Primeira Liga	13	1	1	0	1	0	—		—		15	1
Vitória Setúbal	2018–19	Primeira Liga	26	0	2	0	2	0	—		—		30	0
Nacional	2019–20	LigaPro	23	0	0	0	1	0	—		—		24	0
Nacional	2020–21	Primeira Liga	30	1	0	0	0	0	—		—		30	1
Nacional	Total		53	1	0	0	1	0	—		—		54	1
Career total			407	28	38	6	17	2	27	12	3	0	492	48

=== International ===
Portugal
Year	Apps	Goals
2011	7	2
2012	6	0
2013	3	0
Total	16	2

Scores and results list Portugal's goal tally first, score column indicates score after each Micael goal.

List of international goals scored by Rúben Micael
No.	Date	Venue	Opponent	Score	Result	Competition
1	29 March 2011	Estádio Municipal, Aveiro, Portugal	Finland	1–0	2–0	Friendly
2	29 March 2011	Estádio Municipal, Aveiro, Portugal	Finland	2–0	2–0	Friendly

== Honours ==
Porto

- Primeira Liga: 2010–11, 2011–12
- Taça de Portugal: 2009–10, 2010–11
- Supertaça Cândido de Oliveira: 2011
- UEFA Europa League: 2010–11

Braga

- Taça da Liga: 2012–13
