= Mário Matos =

Portuguese footballer

Personal information
- Full name: Mário Santos de Matos
- Date of birth: 21 June 1988 (age 38)
- Place of birth: Brussels, Belgium
- Height: 1.85 m (6 ft 1 in)
- Position: Goalkeeper

Youth career
- 2005–2006: Anderlecht

Senior career*
Years	Team	Apps	(Gls)
2006–2010	Tubize	14	(0)
2010–2013	Estoril	7	(0)
2013–2014	União Madeira	2	(0)
- * Club domestic league appearances and goals as of 17 December 2015

Mário Santos de Matos (born 21 June 1988) is a Portuguese professional footballer who last played for União Madeira as a goalkeeper. He also holds Belgian citizenship.
