= Douglão =

Brazilian footballer (born 1986)

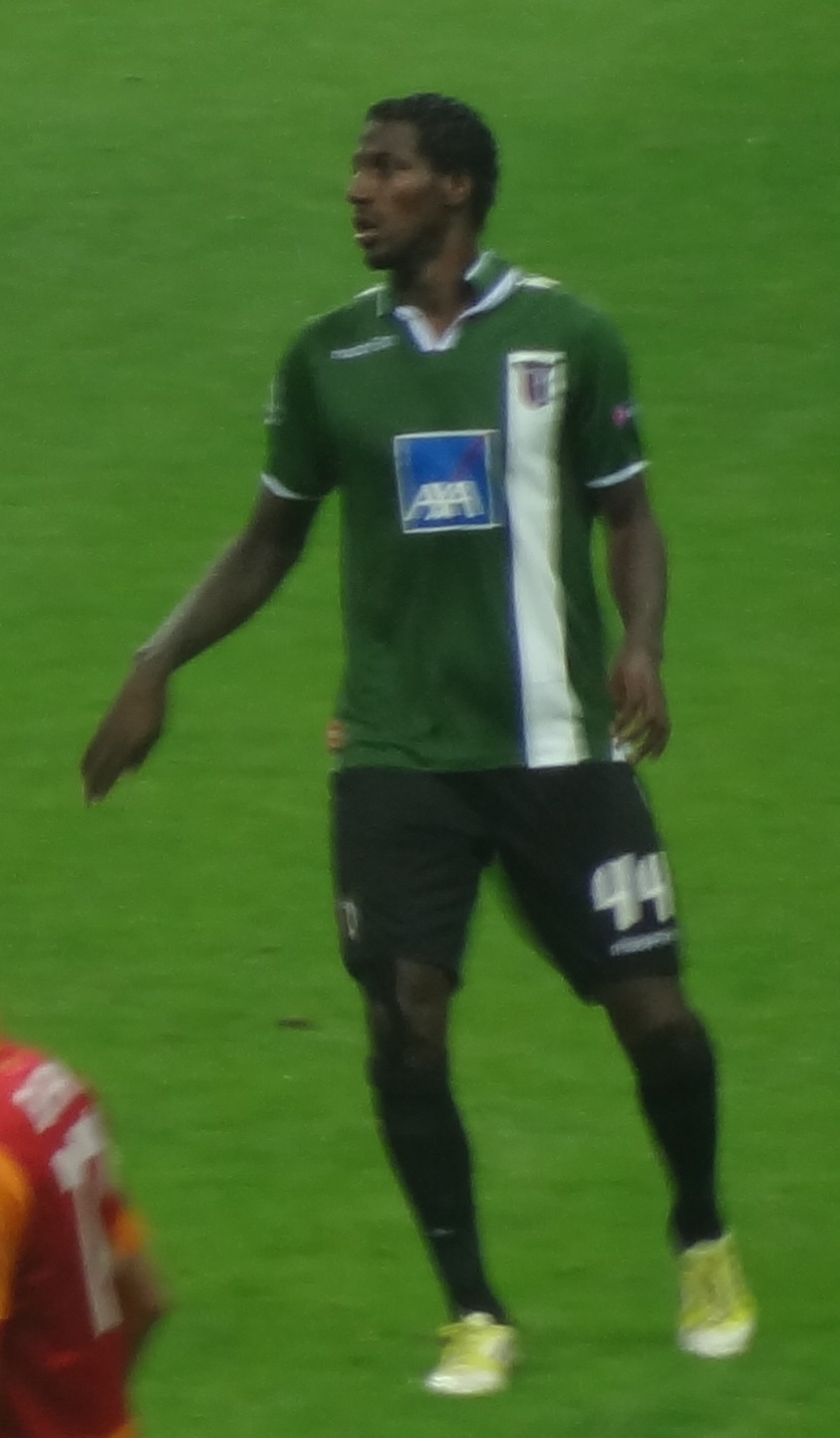

Personal information
- Full name: Douglas Ferreira
- Date of birth: 18 May 1986 (age 40)
- Place of birth: Dois Vizinhos, Brazil
- Height: 1.95 m (6 ft 5 in)
- Position: Defender

Senior career*
Years	Team	Apps	(Gls)
2005–2006	Coritiba	5	(0)
2007–2008	Internacional	0	(0)
2008–2009	Nantes	4	(0)
2009–2011	Kavala	48	(2)
2011–2014	Braga	32	(5)
2013–2014	→ Qatar SC (loan)	24	(4)
2014–2016	Akhisar Belediyespor	60	(6)
2016–2017	Kayserispor	5	(0)
2017–2019	Anorthosis Famagusta	48	(7)
- * Club domestic league appearances and goals as of 18 February 2019

Douglas Ferreira, or simply Douglão (born 18 May 1986), is a Brazilian former professional footballer who played as a defender.

== Career ==
Born in Santos, coast of São Paulo, Douglão appeared for Coritiba and Internacional. In the summer of 8 he moved to French side Nantes, after agreeing to a three-year deal with the Ligue 1 side.

On 17 August 2009, Douglão moved teams and countries again, signing a three-year deal with Super League Greece side Kavala, appearing regularly for the club. In August 2011, he joined Braga, but acted mainly as a backup during his two-year tenure at the Minho side.

On 3 August 2013, Douglão joined Qatar SC in a season-loan deal. He rescinded his link with Braga in July of the following year, moving to Akhisar Belediyespor shortly after.

== Career statistics ==
As of 18 February 2019

Appearances and goals by club, season and competition
Club	Season	League			Cup		Continental		Other		Total	
Club	Season	Division	Apps	Goals	Apps	Goals	Apps	Goals	Apps	Goals	Apps	Goals
Nantes	2008–09	Ligue 1	4	0	1	0	–		–		5	0
Kavala	2009–10	Super League Greece	24	1	6	0	–		–		30	1
Kavala	2010–11	Super League Greece	24	1	2	0	–		–		26	1
Kavala	Total		48	2	8	0	0	0	0	0	56	2
Braga	2011–12	Primeira Liga	19	3	2	0	4	0	4	0	29	3
Braga	2012–13	Primeira Liga	13	3	2	0	5	0	2	0	22	3
Braga	Total		32	6	4	0	9	0	6	0	51	6
Qatar SC (loan)	2013–14	Qatar Stars League	24	4	0	0	–		–		24	4
Akhisar Belediyespor	2014–15	Süper Lig	29	1	4	0	–		–		33	1
Akhisar Belediyespor	2015–16	Süper Lig	25	5	6	1	–		–		31	6
Akhisar Belediyespor	2016–17	Süper Lig	6	0	0	0	–		–		6	0
Akhisar Belediyespor	Total		60	6	10	1	0	0	0	0	70	7
Kayserispor	2016–17	Süper Lig	5	0	3	0	0	0	–		8	0
Anorthosis Famagusta	2017–18	Cypriot First Division	29	4	4	2	0	0	–		33	6
Anorthosis Famagusta	2018–19	Cypriot First Division	19	3	2	0	0	0	–		21	3
Anorthosis Famagusta	Total		48	7	6	2	0	0	0	0	54	9
Career total			221	25	32	3	9	0	6	0	269	28

== Honours ==
Braga

- Portuguese League Cup: 2012–13
