= Baiano (footballer, born 1987) =

Brazilian footballer

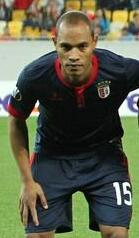
- Baiano with Braga in 2016

Personal information
- Full name: Wanderson Souza Carneiro
- Date of birth: 23 February 1987 (age 39)
- Place of birth: Correntina, Brazil
- Height: 1.78 m (5 ft 10 in)
- Position: Right-back

Youth career
- 2001–2006: Vila Nova-GO

Senior career*
Years	Team	Apps	(Gls)
2006–2007	Vila Nova-GO	6	(0)
2007	→ Rioverdense (loan)		
2007	CRAC		
2008	Anápolis		
2008–2009	Belenenses	8	(0)
2009–2011	Paços Ferreira	53	(2)
2011–2017	Braga	122	(2)
2012–2013	Braga B	5	(1)
2017–2018	Rayo Vallecano	36	(0)
2018–2020	Alanyaspor	37	(0)
2021	Grêmio Anápolis	12	(0)
2021–2022	Nacional	19	(0)
Total		298+	(5+)
- * Club domestic league appearances and goals

Wanderson Souza Carneiro (born 23 February 1987), known as Baiano, is a Brazilian former professional footballer who played as a right-back.

== Club career ==
Born in Correntina, Bahia, Baiano spent most of his career in his country in the lower leagues. His professional input consisted of six Série B games for Vila Nova Futebol Clube, who finished in 20th and last position.

In late June 2008, Baiano moved to Portugal where he would remain the following decade, starting with C.F. Os Belenenses. He appeared rarely for the Lisbon-based team in his only season, as they suffered relegation from the Primeira Liga only to be reinstated due to C.F. Estrela da Amadora's financial irregularities.

Baiano signed for fellow top-division side F.C. Paços de Ferreira in summer 2009, where his performances were eventually noted. He scored his first goal in the competition on 19 September 2010, helping to a 2–2 home draw against S.C. Braga.

In the 2011 off-season, Baiano joined Braga on a free transfer, agreeing to a four-year deal. He played 42 competitive matches in the 2015–16 campaign, including the final of the Taça de Portugal, won on penalties against FC Porto after a 2–2 draw in 120 minutes.

On 2 September 2017, free agent Baiano signed for Spanish Segunda División club Rayo Vallecano. He totalled more than 3,000 minutes of action during his only season, helping them return to La Liga after two years.

Baiano joined Alanyaspor of the Turkish Süper Lig on 28 June 2018, after his contract expired.

== Honours ==
Braga

- Taça de Portugal: 2015–16
- Taça da Liga: 2012–13

Rayo Vallecano

- Segunda División: 2017–18
