= Carlos Eduardo (footballer, born 1993) =

Brazilian footballer

Personal information
- Full name: Carlos Eduardo Manso de Carvalho
- Date of birth: 4 January 1993 (age 33)
- Place of birth: Rio Grande do Norte, Brazil
- Height: 1.78 m (5 ft 10 in)
- Position: Midfielder

Team information
- Current team: Tilikratis Lefkadas
- Number: 11

Youth career
- 2008–2009: Santos
- 2009–2011: Braga

Senior career*
Years	Team	Apps	(Gls)
2012–2013	Braga B	8	(1)
2013–2014	Tirsense	24	(6)
2014–2015	ACS Poli Timișoara	4	(0)
2015–2016	Académico de Viseu	72	(3)
2017–2018	Luverdense	0	(0)
2018–2019	SC Mirandela	2	(0)
2019–2020	FC Felgueiras	1	(0)
2020–2021	APS Zakynthos	19	(3)
2022–2023	Tilikratis Lefkadas	2	(1)
- * Club domestic league appearances and goals as of March 2017

Carlos Eduardo Manso de Carvalho, known as Carlos Eduardo (born 4 January 1993) is a Brazilian football player who plays for Greek 3rd division club Tilikratis Lefkadas.

== Club career ==
He made his professional debut in the Segunda Liga for Braga B on 11 August 2012 in a game against Benfica B.

His rank position as forward player is 168th/1284 players
