= Mário Palmeira =

Portuguese footballer

Personal information
- Full name: Mário José da Costa Palmeira
- Date of birth: 24 September 1989 (age 37)
- Place of birth: Vila Real, Portugal
- Height: 1.87 m (6 ft 1 1/2 in)
- Position: Centre-back

Youth career
- 1999–2008: Diogo Cão

Senior career*
Years	Team	Apps	(Gls)
2008–2013	Braga	2	(0)
2009	→ Ribeirão (loan)	8	(0)
2009–2010	→ Estrela Amadora (loan)	20	(0)
2010–2012	→ Vizela (loan)	36	(2)
2012–2013	Braga B	32	(2)
2013–2014	Tondela	35	(0)
2014–2016	Belenenses	25	(0)
2017	Real Massamá	5	(0)
Total		163	(4)
- * Club domestic league appearances and goals

Mário José da Costa Palmeira (born 24 September 1989 in Vila Real) is a Portuguese former professional footballer who played as a central defender.
