= Maximilian Haas =

German footballer (born 1985)

Personal information
- Full name: Maximilian Johannes Haas
- Date of birth: 7 December 1985 (age 40)
- Place of birth: Freising, West Germany
- Height: 1.90 m (6 ft 3 in)
- Positions: Centre-back; defensive midfielder

Youth career
- –2003: SE Freising

Senior career*
Years	Team	Apps	(Gls)
2003–2007	SE Freising		
2007–2011	Bayern Munich II	62	(4)
2010–2011	Bayern Munich	0	(0)
2011	Middlesbrough	2	(0)
2012	União Leiria	10	(0)
2012–2013	Braga	4	(0)
Medal record
Bayern Munich
Winner	DFL-Supercup	2010
- * Club domestic league appearances and goals

Maximilian Johannes Haas (born 7 December 1985) is a German former professional footballer who played as a centre-back or a defensive midfielder.

== Career ==
=== Early years and Bayern ===
Born in Freising, Bavaria, Haas played four years in the Landesliga with hometown's SE Freising, before joining Bayern Munich II in July 2007. He did not make his debut until 29 October of the following year, when he came on as a 59th-minute substitute for Mehmet Ekici in a 3–3 away draw against SV Sandhausen, but soon became a regular in the team, initially in midfield but subsequently in defence; he scored his first goal for the reserves on 14 February 2009, in a 3–2 loss at Dynamo Dresden.

In 2010, Haas was picked by Bayern Munich manager Louis van Gaal for the main squad, but continued to play mainly for the B-side. He appeared in pre-season friendlies with the former, most notably the Franz Beckenbauer farewell match against Real Madrid, but, not being involved in any competitive games, moved to England on 31 January 2011 and signed for Football League Championship club Middlesbrough for an undisclosed fee.

=== Middlesbrough ===
Haas made his debut for Boro against Queens Park Rangers, playing the last eight minutes in a 3–0 home defeat. He made his first full start in a 4–2 victory at Hull City, on 23 April 2011.

At the end of the season, Haas was released.

=== Portugal ===
In January 2012, Haas had a trial at Karlsruher SC, but nothing came of it. At the end of the month he moved to Portugal and joined U.D. Leiria, signing until 30 June 2014.

On 12 February 2012, Haas made his official debut for his new team, playing the full 90 minutes in a 4–0 away loss to Porto. He was used regularly until the end of the campaign, but eventually terminated his contract alongside several other players due to lack of payments, as the side ranked 16th and last in the Primeira Liga.

On 26 June 2012, Haas signed with S.C. Braga for three years. He played his first league match the following 6 January, playing the entire 1–0 home win against Moreirense; his competitive debut had taken place on 16 November, in the 3–1 success at Pampilhosa for the season's Taça de Portugal.

Haas scored his first and only goal for the Minho side on 2 January 2013, helping to a 2–1 away win over Associação Naval 1º de Maio for the Taça da Liga.

== Honours ==
Bayern Munich

- DFL-Supercup: 2010

Braga

- Taça da Liga: 2012–13
