= Hugo Viana =

Portuguese footballer (born 1983)

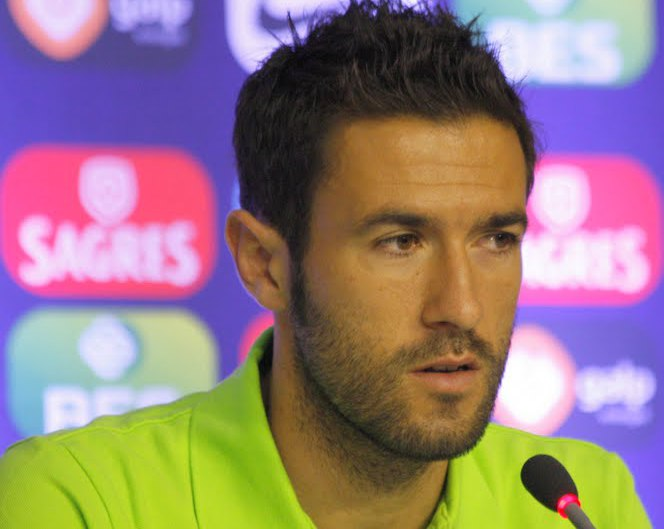
- Viana with Portugal at Euro 2012

Personal information
- Full name: Hugo Miguel Ferreira Gomes Viana
- Date of birth: 15 January 1983 (age 43)
- Place of birth: Barcelos, Portugal
- Height: 1.78 m (5 ft 10 in)
- Position: Central midfielder

Team information
- Current team: Manchester City (director of football)

Youth career
- 1993–1998: Gil Vicente
- 1998–2001: Sporting CP

Senior career*
Years	Team	Apps	(Gls)
2001–2002	Sporting CP	26	(1)
2002–2006	Newcastle United	39	(2)
2004–2005	→ Sporting CP (loan)	32	(6)
2005–2006	→ Valencia (loan)	19	(0)
2006–2010	Valencia	25	(2)
2007–2008	→ Osasuna (loan)	9	(1)
2009–2010	→ Braga (loan)	28	(4)
2010–2013	Braga	78	(12)
2013–2015	Al Ahli	27	(3)
2015–2016	Al Wasl	37	(2)
Total		320	(33)

International career
2002–2005	Portugal U21	22	(3)
2002	Portugal B	1	(0)
2004	Portugal U23	3	(0)
2001–2012	Portugal	29	(1)
Medal record
Men's football
Representing Portugal
UEFA European Championship
Bronze medal – third place	2012 Poland-Ukraine
UEFA European Under-21 Championship
Third place	2004 Germany
UEFA European Under-17 Championship
Winner	2000 Israel
- * Club domestic league appearances and goals

Hugo Miguel Ferreira Gomes Viana (Portuguese pronunciation: [ˈuɣu ˈvjɐnɐ]; born 15 January 1983) is a Portuguese former professional footballer who played as a central midfielder. He is the current director of football of Premier League club Manchester City.

After starting out at Sporting CP, he moved abroad at the age of 19, going on to have unassuming spells in England (Newcastle United) and Spain (Valencia) before settling back in his country with Braga. He amassed Primeira Liga totals of 165 matches and 23 goals over six seasons.

Viana represented Portugal in two World Cups and Euro 2012, also appearing with the under-23s at the 2004 Summer Olympics.

== Club career ==
=== Sporting CP ===
Born in Barcelos, Viana started his professional career at Sporting CP. There, he won the Young European Footballer of the Year award after an excellent debut season in the Primeira Liga.

=== Newcastle United ===
On 20 June 2002, 19-year-old Viana was signed by Newcastle United from the Premier League for €12 million (£8.5 million), his transfer fee becoming a record for the Magpies for a teenager by surpassing the £5 million paid to Nottingham Forest for England under-21 international Jermaine Jenas. The transfer was also a record for a player of his age, breaking the 1999 record held by Robbie Keane; Newcastle invested heavily in young players in that year, and chairman Freddie Shepherd reasoned by claiming consensus that he was the best young player in the world of football. The signing was also the first major deal between Portuguese agent Jorge Mendes and an English club.

Viana joined former Sporting manager Bobby Robson at his new team, and was mentored by veteran Gary Speed. He scored four goals in all competitions during his spell at St James' Park, against Željezničar Sarajevo and Feyenoord in the UEFA Champions League and Birmingham City and West Bromwich Albion in the league.

Viana was unable to cement a starting position, as Speed – for whom Robson saw the Portuguese as a future replacement – was not declining with age, while Kieron Dyer, Jenas and Laurent Robert were also in form. He returned to Sporting on loan in July 2004. He found his old form and enjoyed a successful spell, even helping the Lions to the final of the UEFA Cup.

=== Valencia ===
Viana moved to Valencia at the start of 2005–06, again on loan. In March 2006, reports stated that he had been signed on a permanent deal for £1.5 million. During his first season he struggled to claim a first-team spot, facing tough competition from the likes of David Albelda and Rubén Baraja, manager Quique Sánchez Flores' preferred duo; still, he featured in 19 league games, and displayed some flashes of talent that allowed him to preserve his place in the Portugal national squad.

In a bid to secure first-team football, Viana decided to join fellow La Liga side Osasuna on loan, on 13 July 2007. However, a serious injury during pre-season forced him out for four months. After recovering, he played all of the last three matches, helping to a narrow escape from relegation.

In the 2008–09 campaign, Viana took no part in manager Unai Emery's plans, being restricted to four UEFA Cup matches and two appearances in the Copa del Rey.

=== Braga ===
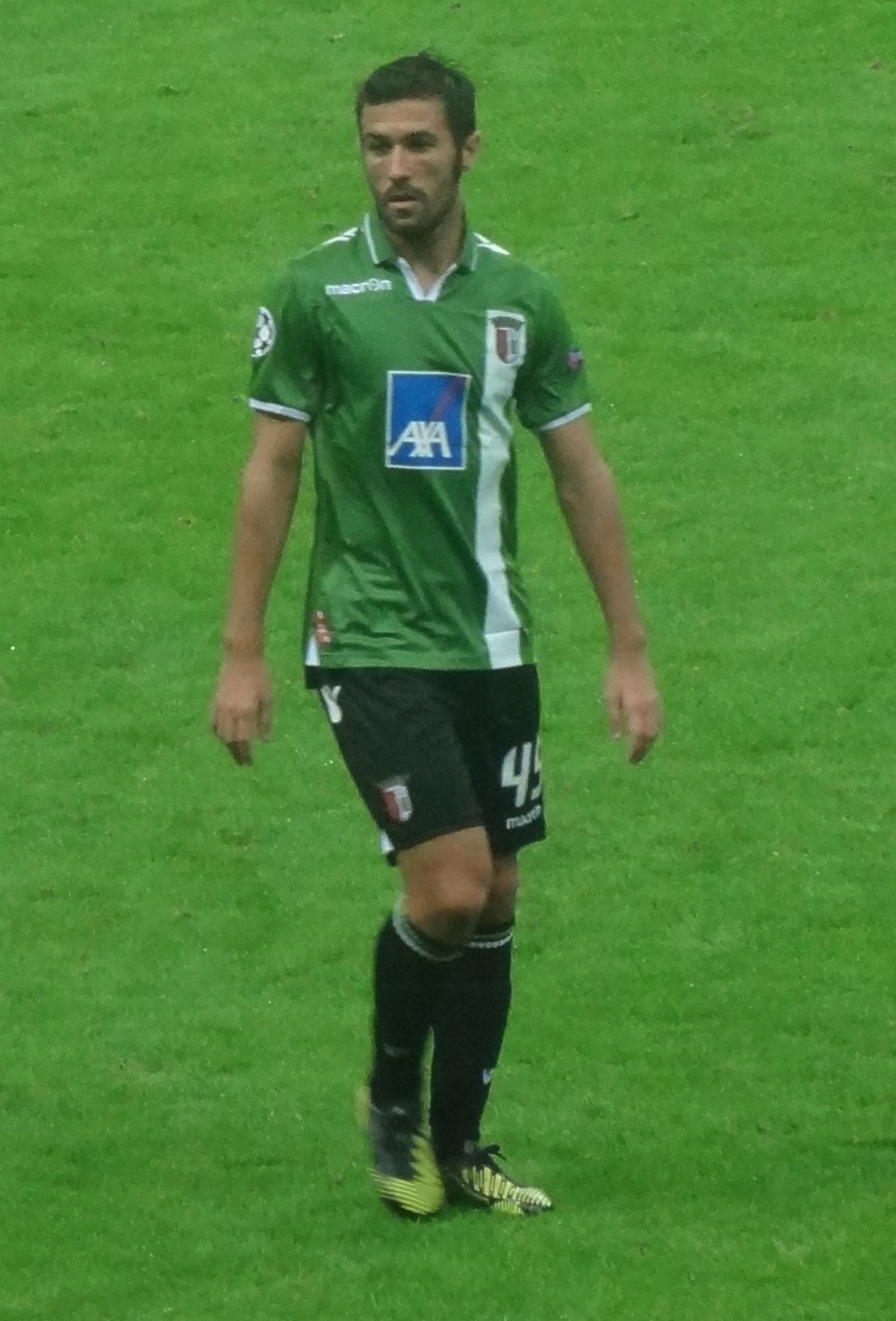
Viana with Braga in October 2012

On 31 July 2009, Viana was loaned to Braga for one season, thus returning to Portugal after three years. As they led the league in its early stages, he scored his first goals upon returning to his country, hitting twice in a 3–1 home win over Belenenses on 30 August. On 31 October, he again found the net, from a free kick against Benfica in a 2–0 home victory where he received player of the match accolades. The Minho side eventually finished in a best-ever second place, losing the title to precisely this team in the last matchday, with the player making 28 appearances (six as a reserve, he lost his importance after the return of Uruguayan Luis Aguiar on loan).

Viana regained his starting position in 2010–11 under the same manager, Domingos Paciência, as Aguiar eventually left the club. On 6 March 2011, again from a direct free kick and against Benfica, he equalised for the hosts in an eventual 2–1 home win. He added nine games (all starts) in Braga's UEFA Europa League runner-up run.

On 27 November 2011, in a game against Porto, Viana displayed a white T-shirt with the words 'Gary Rest In Peace', in a tribute to Speed who had committed suicide earlier that day.

=== Al Ahli and Al Wasl ===
On 5 June 2013, Al Ahli from Dubai announced the signing of Viana effective as of 1 July, when his contract with Braga expired. He made his debut on 30 August in the year's Arabian Gulf Super Cup at the Mohammed Bin Zayed Stadium, a penalty shootout victory after a goalless draw against Al Ain; his performance was described as "quiet" by The National, who attributed it to his unfamiliarity with the heat of the Middle Eastern summer. He totalled 39 appearances and three goals across his first season, helping the team conquer a domestic treble after adding the UAE Pro League and the UAE League Cup.

Viana agreed to a deal with Al Wasl of the same city and league, but the transfer was one of several declared void by the UAE Football Association for missing the 3 October 2014 deadline. It was completed the following 19 January. He retired on 13 October 2016, aged 33.

== International career ==
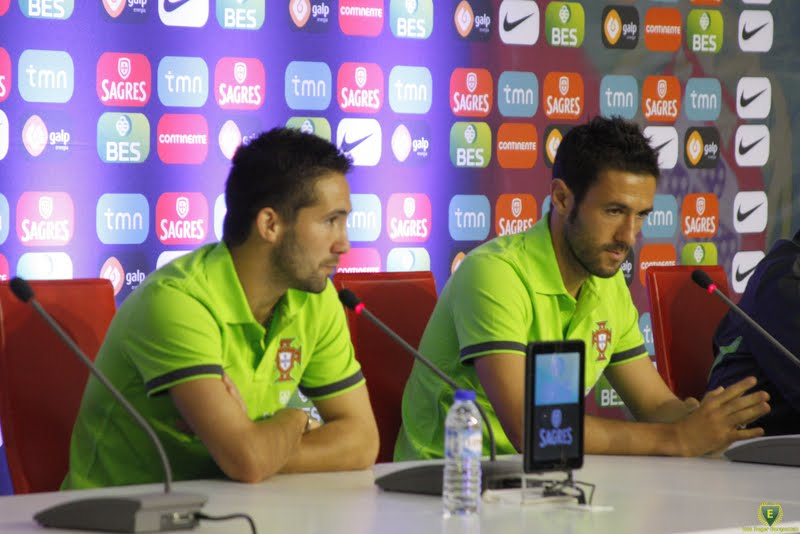
Viana and midfield partner João Moutinho in a press conference ahead of Euro 2012

Viana made his debut with Portugal on 14 November 2001, in a 5–1 friendly defeat of Angola. Replacing suspended Daniel Kenedy in the last minute, he was an unused member at the 2002 FIFA World Cup, but missed UEFA Euro 2004 on home soil. Manager José Romão called him up for the under-23 team for the football tournament at the 2004 Summer Olympics in Greece; he and João Paulo were sent off in a 4–2 group stage elimination by Costa Rica.

Viana then returned to the senior side, and scored his only international goal on 12 October 2005 to conclude a 3–0 home win over Latvia in 2006 FIFA World Cup qualification; he appeared in two matches – both as a substitute – as the team came fourth at the finals in Germany. He was called as a last-minute replacement for injured Carlos Martins to the Euro 2012 squad, with the team already in training camp; he was unused in a run to the semi-finals but ended a five-year international exile in a pre-tournament friendly against Macedonia.

== Style of play ==
Viana was known for his range of passing and his control of the ball, as well as for taking powerful shots from distance, including from free kicks. Conversely, his ability to contribute equally to defence was criticised by pundits. His comparative lack of pace meant that he struggled when placed on the left wing due to Newcastle's strength in central midfield. Charlie Woods, the scout who recommended him to the club, reflected in 2020 that he played like Mesut Özil.

== Post-retirement ==
In May 2017, Viana was appointed director of football at Belenenses. He left his post six months later.

Viana returned to Sporting in 2018, in the same capacity. In August 2021, he was suspended for 15 days and fined €2,295 for insulting the refereeing team after a game against Famalicão held four months earlier.

Viana was supposed to replace longtime incumbent Txiki Begiristain at Manchester City in June 2025. However, he started working alongside the Spaniard two months earlier.

== Personal life ==
Viana married Raquel Gomes in a Catholic ceremony in Orada, Albufeira in June 2003. The marriage produced two daughters and a son.

In 2004, Viana lost his wedding ring on Newcastle Town Moor, but it was returned by a young fan due to the name engraved onto it.

== Career statistics ==
=== Club ===
Appearances and goals by club, season and competition
Club	Season	League			Cup		League cup		Continental		Other		Total	
Club	Season	Division	Apps	Goals	Apps	Goals	Apps	Goals	Apps	Goals	Apps	Goals	Apps	Goals
Sporting CP	2001–02	Primeira Liga	26	1	0	0	—		3	0	—		29	1
Newcastle United	2002–03	Premier League	23	2	0	0	1	0	10	2	—		34	4
Newcastle United	2003–04	Premier League	16	0	1	0	1	0	9	0	—		27	0
Newcastle United	Total		39	2	1	0	2	0	19	2	—		61	4
Sporting CP (loan)	2004–05	Primeira Liga	32	6	2	2	—		10	2	—		44	10
Valencia (loan)	2005–06	La Liga	19	0	2	0	—		0	0	—		21	0
Valencia	2006–07	La Liga	25	2	4	1	—		7	0	—		36	3
Valencia	2008–09	La Liga	0	0	2	0	—		4	0	—		6	0
Valencia	Total		44	2	8	1	—		11	0	—		63	3
Osasuna (loan)	2007–08	La Liga	9	1	2	0	—		0	0	—		11	1
Braga (loan)	2009–10	Primeira Liga	28	4	4	0	1	0	0	0	—		33	4
Braga	2010–11	Primeira Liga	23	3	1	0	3	0	12	0	—		39	3
Braga	2011–12	Primeira Liga	27	2	2	0	4	3	10	0	—		43	5
Braga	2012–13	Primeira Liga	28	7	5	1	3	1	8	0	—		44	9
Braga	Total		106	16	12	1	11	4	30	0	—		159	21
Al Ahli	2013–14	UAE Pro League	24	3	3	0	8	0	6	0	1	0	47	3
Al Ahli	2014–15	UAE Pro League	3	0	—		0	0	—		—		3	0
Al Ahli	Total		27	3	3	0	8	0	6	0	1	0	45	3
Al Wasl	2014–15	UAE Pro League	12	0	1	1	—		—		—		13	1
Al Wasl	2015–16	UAE Pro League	25	2	0	0	7	0	—		—		32	2
Al Wasl	Total		37	2	1	1	7	0	—		—		45	3
Total			320	33	29	5	28	4	79	4	1	0	457	46

=== International ===
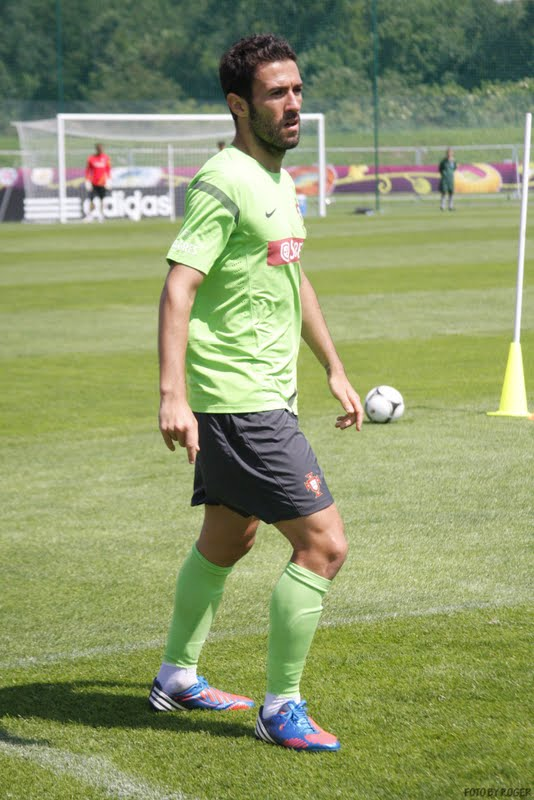
Viana training at Euro 2012

Appearances and goals by national team and year
National team	Year	Apps	Goals
Portugal	2001	1	0
Portugal	2002	5	0
Portugal	2003	4	0
Portugal	2004	2	0
Portugal	2005	6	1
Portugal	2006	5	0
Portugal	2007	3	0
Portugal	2012	3	0
Total		29	1

Scores and results list Portugal's goal tally first, score column indicates score after each Viana goal.

List of international goals scored by Hugo Viana
No.	Date	Venue	Opponent	Score	Result	Competition
1	12 October 2005	Estádio do Dragão, Porto, Portugal	Latvia	3–0	3–0	2006 World Cup qualification

== Honours ==
Sporting CP

- Primeira Liga: 2001–02
- Taça de Portugal: 2001–02
- UEFA Cup runner-up: 2004–05

Braga

- Taça da Liga: 2012–13
- UEFA Europa League runner-up: 2010–11

Al Ahli

- UAE Pro League: 2013–14
- UAE Super Cup: 2013
- UAE League Cup: 2013–14

Orders

- Medal of Merit, Order of the Immaculate Conception of Vila Viçosa (House of Braganza)
