= João Pedro (footballer, born 1986) =

Portuguese footballer

Personal information
- Full name: João Pedro Guerra Cunha
- Date of birth: 4 May 1986 (age 40)
- Place of birth: Figueira de Castelo Rodrigo, Portugal
- Height: 1.76 m (5 ft 9 in)
- Position: Midfielder

Youth career
- 1998–2000: Ginásio Figueirense
- 2000–2004: Braga

Senior career*
| Years | Team | Apps | (Gls) |
| 2004–2008 | Braga B | 52 | (12) |
| 2006–2007 | → Penafiel (loan) | 27 | (3) |
| 2007–2008 | → Beira-Mar (loan) | 24 | (2) |
| 2008–2009 | União Leiria | 25 | (0) |
| 2009–2010 | Oliveirense | 29 | (5) |
| 2010–2013 | Naval | 76 | (14) |
| 2013–2016 | Braga | 14 | (2) |
| 2013–2014 | → Belenenses (loan) | 24 | (3) |
| 2014–2015 | → Moreirense (loan) | 33 | (4) |
| 2015–2016 | → Apollon Limassol (loan) | 34 | (1) |
| 2016–2021 | Apollon Limassol | 145 | (7) |
| 2021–2022 | Académica | 14 | (0) |
| 2022 | APOEL | 14 | (0) |
| 2023–2024 | Ovarense | 28 | (0) |
| 2024–2025 | Pampilhosa | 31 | (1) |
| Total | | 570 | (54) |

International career
| 2003 | Portugal U17 | 9 | (1) |
| 2004 | Portugal U18 | 2 | (1) |
| 2004–2005 | Portugal U19 | 3 | (0) |
| 2007 | Portugal U20 | 2 | (0) |
Medal record
Men's football
Representing Portugal
UEFA European U17 Championship
| Winner | 2003 Portugal |
- * Club domestic league appearances and goals

João Pedro Guerra Cunha (born 4 May 1986), known as João Pedro, is a Portuguese former professional footballer who played as a midfielder.

== Club career ==
Born in Figueira de Castelo Rodrigo, Guarda District, João Pedro began his youth career at hometown club Ginásio Figueirense and completed it at S.C. Braga, where he made his debut with the reserve team in the third division in 2004. After two fairly regular seasons, he spent the following two loaned out a league higher, to F.C. Penafiel and S.C. Beira-Mar. In 2008, he moved to U.D. Leiria of the same level and one year later U.D. Oliveirense.

In 2010, João Pedro signed for Primeira Liga club Associação Naval 1º de Maio. He made his debut in the competition on 14 August, playing the full 90 minutes of a 0–1 home loss against FC Porto, and scored his first goal for them 16 days later, consolation in a 1–3 defeat to Sporting CP also at the Estádio Municipal José Bento Pessoa. In the second half of the campaign he was used only as a substitute, and the Figueira da Foz-based team were relegated.

On 17 January 2013, having scored nine goals for Naval in the first half of a season that would see them relegated for financial reasons, João Pedro returned to Braga. He found the net twice in the league in his second spell, against S.L. Benfica (1–2 home loss) and S.C. Beira-Mar (3–3, away).

João Pedro played only one minute for the Minho Province side in 2013–14, his European debut in a 1–0 win at CS Pandurii Târgu Jiu in the play-offs of the UEFA Europa League on 22 August. Eight days later, he was loaned to fellow top-tier club C.F. Os Belenenses, scoring on his debut but in a 2–3 home loss to C.D. Nacional where he featured 63 minutes from the bench.

On 17 July 2014, João Pedro signed a one-year loan with newly promoted Moreirense FC. He was an integral part of their team, missing only one game due to suspension for a red card in added time of a 2–1 home victory over local rivals Vitória S.C. in which he had scored the winner.

João Pedro moved abroad for the first time on 23 June 2015, joining Cypriot First Division's Apollon Limassol FC on loan and signing a permanent two-year contract in the following off-season.

== Career statistics ==
As of match played on 11 May 2021

| Club | Season | League | | | National Cup | | League Cup | | Continental | | Other | | Total | |
| Club | Season | Division | Apps | Goals | Apps | Goals | Apps | Goals | Apps | Goals | Apps | Goals | Apps | Goals |
|---|---|---|---|---|---|---|---|---|---|---|---|---|---|---|
| Braga B | 2004–05 | Segunda Divisão | 26 | 8 | — | | — | | — | | — | | 26 | 8 |
| Braga B | 2005–06 | Segunda Divisão | 26 | 4 | — | | — | | — | | — | | 26 | 4 |
| Braga B | Total | | 52 | 12 | — | | — | | — | | — | | 52 | 12 |
| Braga | 2004–05 | Primeira Liga | 0 | 0 | 1 | 0 | — | | — | | — | | 1 | 0 |
| Penafiel (loan) | 2006–07 | Segunda Liga | 27 | 3 | 2 | 0 | — | | — | | — | | 29 | 3 |
| Beira-Mar (loan) | 2007–08 | Segunda Liga | 24 | 2 | 1 | 0 | 7 | 0 | — | | — | | 32 | 2 |
| União Leiria | 2008–09 | Segunda Liga | 25 | 0 | 2 | 0 | 4 | 0 | — | | — | | 31 | 0 |
| Oliveirense | 2009–10 | Segunda Liga | 29 | 5 | 3 | 1 | 2 | 0 | — | | — | | 34 | 6 |
| Naval | 2010–11 | Primeira Liga | 26 | 2 | 1 | 0 | 3 | 1 | — | | — | | 30 | 3 |
| Naval | 2011–12 | Segunda Liga | 30 | 3 | 3 | 1 | 4 | 1 | — | | — | | 37 | 5 |
| Naval | 2012–13 | Segunda Liga | 20 | 9 | 2 | 1 | 6 | 1 | — | | — | | 28 | 11 |
| Naval | Total | | 76 | 14 | 6 | 2 | 13 | 3 | — | | — | | 95 | 19 |
| Braga | 2012–13 | Primeira Liga | 14 | 2 | 1 | 0 | 2 | 0 | — | | — | | 17 | 2 |
| Braga | 2013–14 | Primeira Liga | 0 | 0 | 0 | 0 | 0 | 0 | 1 (Note: Appearances in UEFA Europa League) | 0 | — | | 1 | 0 |
| Braga | Total | | 14 | 2 | 1 | 0 | 2 | 0 | 1 | 0 | — | | 18 | 2 |
| Belenenses (loan) | 2013–14 | Primeira Liga | 24 | 3 | 0 | 0 | 4 | 0 | — | | — | | 28 | 3 |
| Moreirense (loan) | 2014–15 | Primeira Liga | 33 | 4 | 1 | 0 | 2 | 0 | — | | — | | 36 | 4 |
| Apollon Limassol (loan) | 2015–16 | Cypriot First Division | 34 | 1 | 6 | 0 | — | | 6 | 1 | — | | 46 | 2 |
| Apollon Limassol | 2016–17 | Cypriot First Division | 30 | 3 | 7 | 1 | — | | 2 | 0 | 1 (Note: Appearance in Cypriot Super Cup) | 0 | 40 | 4 |
| Apollon Limassol | 2017–18 | Cypriot First Division | 33 | 2 | 6 | 0 | — | | 12 | 1 | 1 | 0 | 52 | 3 |
| Apollon Limassol | 2018–19 | Cypriot First Division | 29 | 0 | 5 | 0 | — | | 13 | 0 | — | | 47 | 0 |
| Apollon Limassol | 2019–20 | Cypriot First Division | 21 | 1 | 3 | 0 | — | | 8 | 0 | — | | 32 | 1 |
| Apollon Limassol | 2020–21 | Cypriot First Division | 32 | 1 | 0 | 0 | — | | 1 | 0 | — | | 33 | 1 |
| Apollon Limassol | Total | | 145 | 7 | 21 | 1 | — | | 36 | 1 | 2 | 0 | 204 | 9 |
| Career total | | | 482 | 53 | 44 | 4 | 34 | 3 | 43 | 2 | 2 | 0 | 605 | 62 |

== Honours ==
Braga

- Taça da Liga: 2012–13

Apollon

- Cypriot Cup: 2015–16, 2016–17
- Cypriot Super Cup: 2016, 2017

Portugal

- UEFA European Under-17 Championship: 2003
