= Carlão (footballer, born August 1986) =

Brazilian footballer

Personal information
- Full name: Carlos Alexandre de Souza Silva
- Date of birth: 1 August 1986 (age 40)
- Place of birth: Duque de Caxias, Brazil
- Height: 1.90 m (6 ft 3 in)
- Position: Striker

Senior career*
Years	Team	Apps	(Gls)
2008	São Cristóvão		
2008	→ Duque Caxias (loan)		
2009–2010	União Leiria	54	(25)
2011–2012	Kashima Antlers	5	(1)
2011	→ Neuchâtel Xamax (loan)	2	(0)
2011–2012	→ Braga (loan)	11	(1)
2012–2013	Braga	15	(3)
2013–2014	Paços Ferreira	8	(0)
2014–2015	Shijiazhuang Ever Bright	30	(9)
2016–2017	Famalicão	27	(8)
2017–2018	Ubon UMT United	16	(6)
2018	Nea Salamina	15	(10)
2018	Pattaya United	15	(6)
2019	Samut Prakan City	6	(1)
2019	Doxa	8	(1)
- * Club domestic league appearances and goals as of 1 December 2019

Carlos Alexandre de Souza Silva (born 1 August 1986), commonly known as Carlão, is a Brazilian professional footballer who plays as a striker.

== Club career ==
Carlão was born in Duque de Caxias, Rio de Janeiro. On 28 April 2008, he signed a three-month contract with Duque de Caxias Futebol Clube for the rest of the Série B season, joining from São Cristóvão de Futebol e Regatas. On 11 February of the following year he was signed by U.D. Leiria in the Portuguese second division, where he quickly made an impact as he scored 11 goals in just 12 games to help his team return to the Primeira Liga after a one-year absence; this included four past S.C. Olhanense in a 5–1 home win, on 3 May.

Carlão only netted five times in his first full season, however, in 28 matches. In late December 2010, after being linked to fellow league side Sporting CP, he was sold to Kashima Antlers of the J1 League, and in July 2011 the Japanese club loaned him to Neuchâtel Xamax in Switzerland.

In early September 2011, still owned by Kashima, Carlão returned to Portugal and joined S.C. Braga. On 9 January 2012, after having come on as a substitute for Édson Rivera in the 60th minute of an away fixture against S.C. Beira-Mar, he scored the 2–1 winner.

On 19 February 2014, after a brief spell with F.C. Paços de Ferreira, Carlão moved to the China League One with Shijiazhuang Yongchan FC.

== Honours ==
Braga

- Taça da Liga: 2012–13
