= Mauro (footballer, born 1990) =

Brazilian footballer

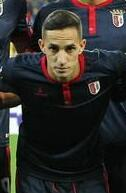
- Mauro lining up for Braga in 2016

Personal information
- Full name: Mauro Silva Sousa
- Date of birth: 31 October 1990 (age 36)
- Place of birth: Livramento, Brazil
- Height: 1.78 m (5 ft 10 in)
- Position: Defensive midfielder

Youth career
- Goianiense

Senior career*
Years	Team	Apps	(Gls)
2010–2011	Goianiense	6	(0)
2011–2012	Gil Vicente	9	(0)
2012–2015	Braga B	37	(2)
2012–2018	Braga	68	(0)
Total		120	(2)
- * Club domestic league appearances and goals

Mauro Silva Sousa (born 31 October 1990), known simply as Mauro, is a Brazilian former professional footballer who played as a defensive midfielder.

== Club career ==
Mauro was born in Livramento de Nossa Senhora, Bahia. He spent his entire professional career in Portugal after starting out at Atlético Clube Goianiense, representing Primeira Liga clubs Gil Vicente F.C. and S.C. Braga.

On 3 June 2018, aged only 27, Mauro was forced to retire due a serious knee injury contracted in late November 2016 that led to a bacterial infection.

== Honours ==
Braga

- Taça de Portugal: 2015–16
