= Paulo Regula =

Portuguese footballer (born 1989)

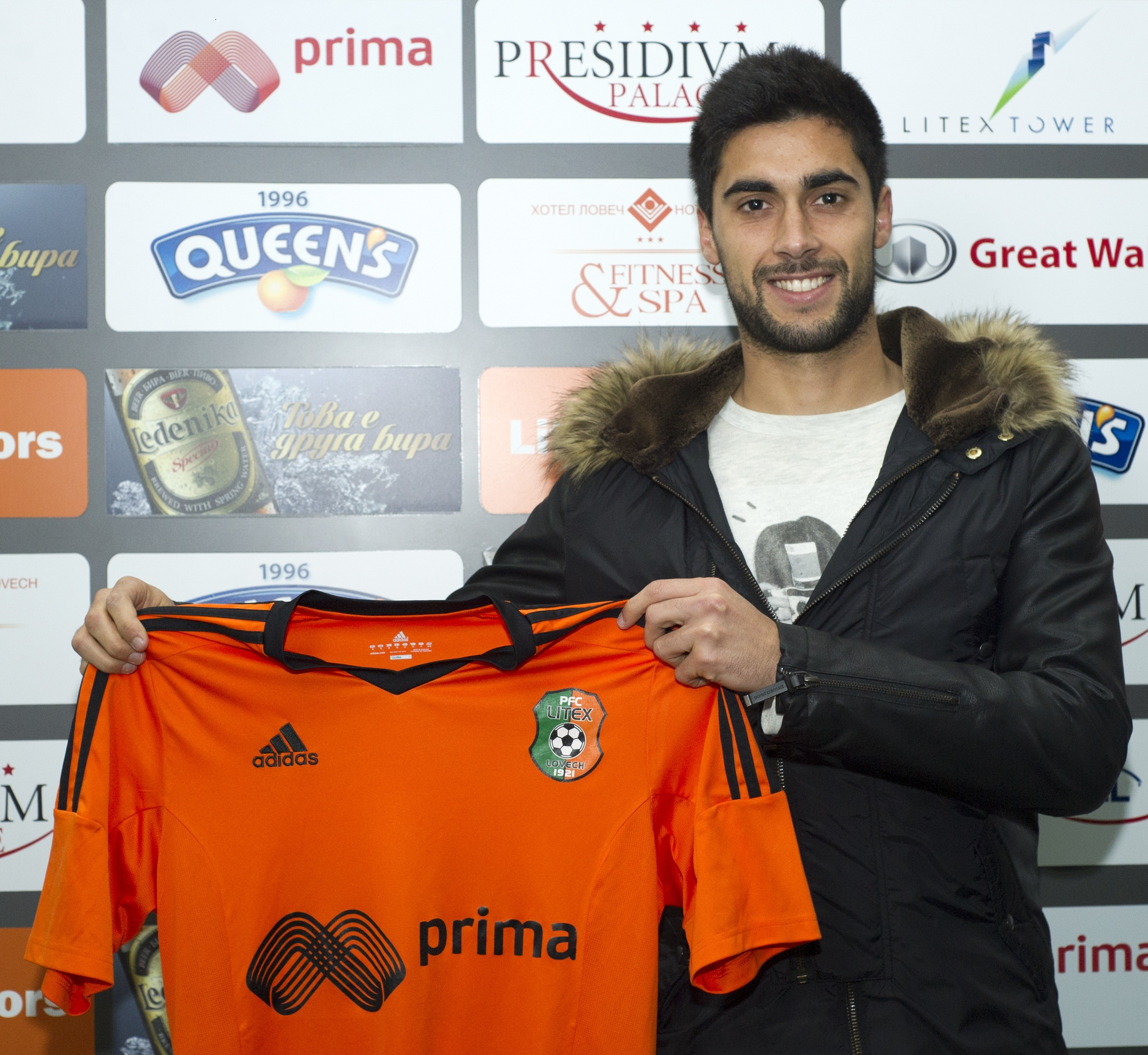
- Regula being presented by Litex Lovech

Personal information
- Full name: Paulo Roberto Costa Regula
- Date of birth: 12 March 1989 (age 37)
- Place of birth: Sarilhos Pequenos, Portugal
- Height: 1.73 m (5 ft 8 in)
- Position: Midfielder

Youth career
- 1999–2000: Moitense
- 2000–2002: Sporting CP
- 2002–2008: Vitória Setúbal

Senior career*
Years	Team	Apps	(Gls)
2008–2011	Vitória Setúbal	26	(1)
2011–2015	Olhanense	38	(8)
2012–2013	→ Naval (loan)	35	(6)
2015	→ Litex Lovech (loan)	12	(1)
2015–2016	Atlético	33	(6)
2017	Pinhalnovense	12	(2)
Total		156	(24)

International career
2009	Portugal U21	2	(0)
- * Club domestic league appearances and goals

Paulo Roberto Costa Regula (born 12 March 1989) is a Portuguese former professional footballer who played as a midfielder.

== Career ==
Regula was born in Sarilhos Pequenos, Setúbal District. He started playing football with Sporting CP, moving to Vitória de Setúbal in 2002 at the age of 13 to complete his development. He began to receive callups to the latter's main squad in the 2008–09 season, making his debut in the Primeira Liga on 24 January 2009 by coming on as a 62nd-minute substitute in a 1–0 home loss against Naval 1º de Maio.

Regula repeated individual numbers in the 2009–10 campaign, again appearing in 11 league games but managing to score once – in the 5–3 defeat away to Paços de Ferreira– as the Sadinos again retained their status. On 11 November 2010, he suffered a serious injury to his fibula in a match against União de Leiria and, on 30 June 2011, as his contract expired, was released by the club.

Having become a free agent, Regula was set to complete a transfer to Catania in Italy, with the move even being announced in July 2011. However, the deal collapsed shortly after, and he signed for Olhanense the following month.

Regula was loaned to Segunda Liga team Naval for 2012–13. In February 2015, still owned by Olhanense, he joined Litex Lovech from Bulgaria.

Ahead of the 2015–16 season, Regula agreed to a one-year contract at second-tier Atlético Clube de Portugal.
