= 2012–13 Taça da Liga =

Tournament details
- Host country: Portugal
- Dates: 28 July 2012 – 14 April 2013
- Teams: 32

Final positions
- Champions: Braga (1st title)
- Runners-up: Porto

Tournament statistics
- Matches played: 67
- Goals scored: 147 (2.19 per match)
- Attendance: 133,547 (1,993 per match)
- Top scorers: Rabiola; Rafael Porcellis; Fabrício; Josué; (5 goals each)

The 2012–13 Taça da Liga was the sixth edition of the Taça da Liga, the Portuguese football league cup competition. It was organized by the Portuguese League for Professional Football (LPFP) and contested between the 32 clubs competing in the 2012–13 Primeira Liga and 2012–13 Segunda Liga, the top two tiers of Portuguese football. The first matches were played on 28 July 2012, and the final was played on Estádio Cidade de Coimbra in Coimbra, on 13 April 2013.

Braga eliminated the holders and four-time winners Benfica in a penalty shootout in the semi-finals. In the final, they defeated Porto 1–0 to win their first title in the competition.

== Format ==
The competition format for the 2012–13 edition consists of three rounds plus a knockout phase. In the first round, only teams competing in the 2012–13 Segunda Liga (excluding reserve teams from Primeira Liga clubs) take part. The sixteen teams are drawn into four groups of four teams, where each team plays against the other three in a single round-robin format. The group winners and runners-up advance to the second round. In the second round, the eight teams that qualified from the previous round are joined by the six Primeira Liga teams placed 9th to 14th in the previous season and the two teams promoted to 2012–13 Primeira Liga. Two-legged home-and-away fixtures are played between Segunda Liga teams qualifying from the first round and Primeira Liga teams entering this round, and the winner advances to the third round.

The third round features the eight winners of the previous round the remaining eight Primeira Liga teams, ranked 1st to 8th in the previous season. Similarly to the first round, the sixteen teams are drawn into four groups of four teams, according to a seeding based on their classification in the previous season. Each team plays against the other three in a single round-robin format, and only the group winners advance to the knockout phase. The knockout phase consists of semi-finals and one final, both decided in one-legged fixtures. The final match is played at a neutral venue.

Round	Teams entering in this round	Teams advancing from previous round
First round (16 teams)	16 teams competing in the 2012–13 Segunda Liga	
Second round (16 teams)	6 teams ranked 9th–14th in the 2011–12 Primeira Liga; 2 teams promoted to the 2012–13 Primeira Liga	4 group winners from the first round; 4 group runners-up from the first round
Third round (16 teams)	8 teams ranked 1st–8th in the 2011–12 Primeira Liga	8 winners from the second round
Knockout phase (4 teams)		4 group winners from the third round

== Teams ==
The 32 teams competing in the two professional tiers of Portuguese football for the 2012–13 season are eligible to participate in this competition. For Primeira Liga teams, the final league position in the previous season determines if they enter in the second or third round of the Taça da Liga.

Third round (Primeira Liga)
Porto (1st)	Braga (3rd)	Marítimo (5th)	Nacional (7th)
Benfica (2nd)	Sporting CP (4th)	Vitória de Guimarães (6th)	Olhanense (8th)
Second round (Primeira Liga)
Gil Vicente (9th)	Vitória de Setúbal (11th)	Académica (13th)	Estoril (P1)
Paços de Ferreira (10th)	Beira-Mar (12th)	Rio Ave (14th)	Moreirense (P1)
First round (Segunda Liga)
Desportivo das Aves (3rd)	Trofense (7th)	Leixões (11th)	Sporting da Covilhã (15th)
Naval (4th)	Penafiel (8th)	Santa Clara (12th)	Portimonense (16th)
Belenenses (5th)	Atlético CP (9th)	Arouca (13th)	Feirense (R1)
Oliveirense (6th)	União da Madeira (10th)	Freamunde (14th)	Tondela (P2)

Key

- Nth: League position in the 2011–12 season
- P1: Promoted to the Primeira Liga
- P2: Promoted to the Segunda Liga
- R1: Relegated to the Segunda Liga

Notes

- Sporting da Covilhã finished 15th in the 2011–12 Segunda Liga, in position to be relegated to the Second Division for the 2012–13 season. However, as União de Leiria – which were relegated from the Primeira Liga, together with Feirense – were unable to fulfill the LPFP requirements mandatory for entry in professional competitions, they were further relegated to the Second Division and Covilhã was invited to take União de Leiria's place.
- Portimonense finished 16th (last) in the 2011–12 Segunda Liga, in position to be relegated to the Second Division for the 2012–13 season. However, as 2011–12 Second Division champions Varzim were unable to fulfill the LPFP requirements mandatory for entry in professional competitions, they were not promoted to the Segunda Liga, together with Tondela, and so Portimonense were invited to take Varzim's place.

== Schedule ==
All draws were held at the LPFP headquarters in Porto, except the draw for the first round, which was done at the Palácio do Freixo in Porto, during the draw ceremony for the LPFP competitions.

Round		Draw date	First leg	Second leg	Teams	Fixtures
First round	Matchday 1	5 July 2012	29 July 2012		32 → 24	24
First round	Matchday 2	5 July 2012	1 August 2012		32 → 24	24
First round	Matchday 3	5 July 2012	5 August 2012		32 → 24	24
Second round		29 August 2012	26 September 2012	31 October 2012	24 → 16	16
Third round	Matchday 1	5 November 2012	19 December 2012		16 → 4	24
Third round	Matchday 2	5 November 2012	30 December 2012 / 2 January 2013		16 → 4	24
Third round	Matchday 3	5 November 2012	9 January 2013		16 → 4	24
Knockout phase	Semi-finals	5 November 2012	27 February 2013		4 → 2	3
Knockout phase	Final	5 November 2012	14 April 2013 (Estádio Cidade de Coimbra, Coimbra)		2 → 1	3

== First round ==
=== Group A ===
Pos	Team	Pld	W	D	L	GF	GA	GD	Pts	Qualification	UDM	FRM	BEL	OLI
1	União da Madeira	3	2	1	0	4	2	+2	7	Advance to second round			1–0	2–1
2	Freamunde	3	1	1	1	3	3	0	4	Advance to second round	1–1			
3	Belenenses	3	1	1	1	2	2	0	4			1–0		1–1
4	Oliveirense	3	0	1	2	3	5	−2	1			1–2		

=== Group B ===
Pos	Team	Pld	W	D	L	GF	GA	GD	Pts	Qualification	NAV	SCO	ARO	ATL
1	Naval	3	1	2	0	4	2	+2	5	Advance to second round		1–1		3–1
2	Sporting da Covilhã	3	1	1	1	5	4	+1	4	Advance to second round			4–2	
3	Arouca	3	1	1	1	4	5	−1	4		0–0			2–1
4	Atlético CP	3	1	0	2	3	5	−2	3			1–0		

=== Group C ===
Pos	Team	Pld	W	D	L	GF	GA	GD	Pts	Qualification	FEI	LEI	PRM	PEN
1	Feirense	3	2	1	0	4	2	+2	7	Advance to second round			2–1	2–1
2	Leixões	3	0	3	0	2	2	0	3	Advance to second round	0–0			1–1
3	Portimonense	3	0	2	1	3	4	−1	2			1–1		
4	Penafiel	3	0	2	1	3	4	−1	2				1–1	

=== Group D ===
Pos	Team	Pld	W	D	L	GF	GA	GD	Pts	Qualification	STC	AVE	TON	TRO
1	Santa Clara	3	3	0	0	9	1	+8	9	Advance to second round		3–1		5–0
2	Desportivo das Aves	3	2	0	1	9	4	+5	6	Advance to second round			3–0	5–1
3	Tondela	3	1	0	2	1	4	−3	3		0–1			
4	Trofense	3	0	0	3	1	11	−10	0				0–1	

== Second round ==
Team 1	Agg.	Team 2	1st leg	2nd leg
Leixões	1–2	Vitória de Setúbal	0–1	1–1
Sporting da Covilhã	2–2 (2–3 p)	Académica	2–0	0–2
Naval	3–2	Gil Vicente	1–1	2–1
União da Madeira	1–2	Estoril	0–1	1–1
Santa Clara	1–3	Beira-Mar	0–1	1–2
Freamunde	2–3	Rio Ave	2–3	0–0
Feirense	1–1 (2–4 p)	Moreirense	1–0	0–1
Desportivo das Aves	0–2	Paços de Ferreira	0–1	0–1

== Third round ==
The draw for the third round took place on 5 November 2012 at the LPFP headquarters in Porto. The third round group phase matches took place between December 2012 and January 2013.

=== Group A ===
Pos	Team	Pld	W	D	L	GF	GA	GD	Pts	Qualification
1	Porto	3	2	1	0	5	2	+3	7	Advance to knockout phase
2	Vitória de Setúbal	3	1	1	1	3	2	+1	4	
3	Nacional	3	1	0	2	2	5	−3	3	
4	Estoril	3	0	2	1	2	3	−1	2	

19 December 2012
18:00

Nacional	0–2	Porto
	Report	González 32'; Otamendi 50'

Estádio da Madeira, Madeira
Attendance: 1,437
Referee: Bruno Esteves
19 December 2012
20:00

Estoril	0–0	Vitória de Setúbal
	Report

Estádio António Coimbra da Mota, Estoril
Attendance: 517
Referee: Hugo Miguel

30 December 2012
15:00

Vitória de Setúbal	3–1	Nacional
Jorginho 39'; Bruno Amaro 44'; Meyong 67'	Report	Claudemir 9'

Estádio do Bonfim, Setúbal
Attendance: 1,371
Referee: Jorge Sousa
30 December 2012
18:15

Estoril	2–2	Porto
Vitória 15', 61' (pen.)	Report	Martínez 31'; Moutinho 88'

Estádio António Coimbra da Mota, Estoril
Attendance: 3,257
Referee: Jorge Ferreira

9 January 2013
17:30

Porto	1–0	Vitória de Setúbal
Moutinho 44' (pen.)	Report

Estádio do Dragão, Porto
Attendance: 12,808
Referee: João Capela
9 January 2013
17:30

Nacional	1–0	Estoril
Claudemir 54' (pen.)	Report

Estádio da Madeira, Madeira
Attendance: 346
Referee: Hugo Pacheco

=== Group B ===
Pos	Team	Pld	W	D	L	GF	GA	GD	Pts	Qualification
1	Braga	3	2	1	0	5	1	+4	7	Advance to knockout phase
2	Vitória de Guimarães	3	1	2	0	3	2	+1	5	
3	Beira-Mar	3	0	2	1	2	5	−3	2	
4	Naval	3	0	1	2	1	3	−2	1	

19 December 2012
16:00

Naval	0–0	Beira-Mar
	Report

Estádio Municipal José Bento Pessoa, Figueira da Foz
Attendance: 217
Referee: Marco Ferreira
19 December 2012
20:00

Vitória de Guimarães	0–0	Braga
	Report

Estádio D. Afonso Henriques, Guimarães
Attendance: 4,693
Referee: Duarte Gomes

30 December 2012
16:00

Beira-Mar	2–2	Vitória de Guimarães
Ribeiro 54', 79'	Report	Pereira 11'; Matias 66'

Estádio Municipal de Aveiro, Aveiro
Attendance: 2,233
Referee: Carlos Xistra
2 January 2013
18:00

Naval	1–2	Braga
Regula 4' (pen.)	Report	Haas 23'; Custódio 79' (pen.)

Estádio Municipal José Bento Pessoa, Figueira da Foz
Attendance: 524
Referee: Vasco Santos

9 January 2013
18:00

Braga	3–0	Beira-Mar
Carlão 37'; Amorim 41'; Viana 88'	Report

Estádio Municipal de Braga, Braga
Attendance: 4,728
Referee: Bruno Paixão
9 January 2013
18:00

Vitória de Guimarães	2–0	Naval
Pereira 39'; Crivellaro 88'	Report

Estádio D. Afonso Henriques, Guimarães
Attendance: 814
Referee: Pedro Proença

=== Group C ===
Pos	Team	Pld	W	D	L	GF	GA	GD	Pts	Qualification
1	Rio Ave	3	2	0	1	6	3	+3	6	Advance to knockout phase
2	Paços de Ferreira	3	2	0	1	5	3	+2	6	
3	Sporting CP	3	1	1	1	3	5	−2	4	
4	Marítimo	3	0	1	2	2	5	−3	1	

18 December 2012
18:15

Marítimo	2–2	Sporting CP
Héldon 40'; Miranda 65'	Report	Van Wolfswinkel 29'; Xandão 87'

Estádio dos Barreiros, Madeira
Attendance: 3,977
Referee: Olegário Benquerença
19 December 2012
20:00

Rio Ave	2–3	Paços de Ferreira
Nivaldo 70'; Braga 90+3'	Report	Angulo 18'; Josué 30', 39'

Estádio do Rio Ave FC, Vila do Conde
Attendance: 453
Referee: Pedro Proença

29 December 2012
19:45

Rio Ave	3–0	Sporting CP
Obadeyi 55'; Tarantini 65'; Hassan 90+1'	Report

Estádio do Rio Ave FC, Vila do Conde
Attendance: 1,732
Referee: Rui Costa
30 December 2012
16:00

Paços de Ferreira	2–0	Marítimo
Josué 44', 90'	Report

Estádio da Mata Real, Paços de Ferreira
Attendance: 906
Referee: João Capela

9 January 2013
17:00

Sporting CP	1–0	Paços de Ferreira
Van Wolfswinkel 87'	Report

Estádio José Alvalade, Lisbon
Attendance: 6,157
Referee: Paulo Baptista
9 January 2013
17:00

Marítimo	0–1	Rio Ave
	Report	Bebé 74'

Estádio dos Barreiros, Madeira
Attendance: 820
Referee: Artur Soares Dias

=== Group D ===
Pos	Team	Pld	W	D	L	GF	GA	GD	Pts	Qualification
1	Benfica	3	2	1	0	6	4	+2	7	Advance to knockout phase
2	Moreirense	3	0	3	0	3	3	0	3	
3	Académica	3	0	2	1	4	5	−1	2	
4	Olhanense	3	0	2	1	1	2	−1	2	

19 December 2012
16:00

Moreirense	2–2	Académica
Ghilas 85', 90+4'	Report	Halliche 12'; Eduardo 52'

Parque de Jogos Comendador Joaquim de Almeida Freitas, Moreira de Cónegos
Attendance: 438
Referee: Bruno Paixão
19 December 2012
19:45

Olhanense	1–2	Benfica
Brandão 48'	Report	Rodrigo 69'; Lima 87'

Estádio José Arcanjo, Olhão
Attendance: 3,213
Referee: Paulo Baptista

30 December 2012
16:00

Moreirense	1–1	Benfica
Ghilas 41'	Report	Cardozo 90+2' (pen.)

Parque de Jogos Comendador Joaquim de Almeida Freitas, Moreira de Cónegos
Attendance: 6,100
Referee: Cosme Machado
30 December 2012
16:00

Académica	0–0	Olhanense
	Report

Estádio Cidade de Coimbra, Coimbra
Attendance: 920
Referee: João Ferreira

9 January 2013
19:45

Benfica	3–2	Académica
Lima 39', 65'; Alan Kardec 61'	Report	Makelele 44'; Saleiro 49'

Estádio da Luz, Lisbon
Attendance: 13,872
Referee: Manuel Mota
9 January 2013
19:45

Olhanense	0–0	Moreirense
	Report

Estádio José Arcanjo, Olhão
Attendance: 455
Referee: Duarte Gomes

== Knockout phase ==
Semi-finals
27 February – Estádio AXA
Braga (p)	0 (3)
Benfica	0 (2)
3 April – Estádio do Dragão
Porto	4
Rio Ave	0

Final
13 April – Estádio Cidade de Coimbra
Braga	1
Porto	0

=== Semi-finals ===
27 February 2013
19:45

Braga	0–0	Benfica
	Report
Penalties
Alan (penalty missed); Custódio (penalty scored); João Pedro (penalty scored); Amorim (penalty scored)	3–2	(penalty scored) Rodrigo; (penalty missed) Luisão; (penalty scored) Pérez; (penalty missed) Roderick; (penalty missed) Gaitán

Estádio AXA, Braga
Attendance: 10,141
Referee: Marco Ferreira
3 April 2013
16:45

Porto	4–0	Rio Ave
J. Rodríguez 57' (pen.); Fernando 72'; Defour 83'; Mangala 90+3'	Report

Estádio do Dragão, Porto
Attendance: 12,509
Referee: Hugo Miguel

=== Final ===
13 April 2013
19:45

Braga	1–0	Porto
Alan 45+2' (pen.)	Report

Estádio Cidade de Coimbra, Coimbra
Attendance: 18,519
Referee: João Capela

== Statistics ==
=== Top goalscorers ===
Rank	Player	Club	Goals	Games
1	Rabiola	Desportivo das Aves	5	4
2	Fabrício	Sporting da Covilhã	5	5
2	Josué	Paços de Ferreira	5	5
2	Rafael Porcellis	Santa Clara	5	5
5	Lima	Benfica	3	3
6	Nabil Ghilas	Moreirense	3	5
6	Albert Meyong	Vitória de Setúbal	3	5
8	Brito	Gil Vicente	2	2
8	João Tomás	Rio Ave	2	2
10	Claudemir	Nacional	2	3
10	Ricardo Pereira	Vitória de Guimarães	2	3
10	Edinho	Académica	2	3
10	Hélder Ferreira	Penafiel	2	3
10	Joeano	Arouca	2	3
10	Ricky van Wolfswinkel	Sporting CP	2	3
10	Rúben Fernandes	Portimonense	2	3
10	Rui Varela	Atlético CP	2	3
10	Steven Vitória	Estoril	2	3
19	Rúben Ribeiro	Beira-Mar	2	4
19	João Moutinho	Porto	2	4
