= 2012–13 Gil Vicente F.C. season =

Gil Vicente
2012–13 season
- Chairman: António Fiúsa
- Manager: Paulo Alves
- Stadium: Estádio Cidade de Barcelos
- Primeira Liga: 13th
- Taça de Portugal: Quarter-finals
- Taça da Liga: Second Round
- Top goalscorer: League: Hugo Vieira (8); All: Hugo Vieira (8)
- Highest home attendance: 8,298 vs Porto (19 August 2012)
- Lowest home attendance: 2,061 vs Beira-Mar (31 October 2011)
Home colours	Away colours

The 2012–13 Gil Vicente F.C. season was the club's 80th competitive season, 16th in the Primeira Liga, and 88th year in existence as a football club.

As well as competing in the Primeira Liga, Gil Vicente took part in the Taça de Portugal and the Taça da Liga entering at the third and second rounds respectively. They were eliminated in the quarter-finals of the Taça de Portugal following a 2–1 away defeat by Paços de Ferreira. The Gilistas were eliminated in the second round of the Taça da Liga following a 3–2 aggregate loss by Naval 1º de Maio. Gil Vicente finished in 13th place in the league.

== Key events ==
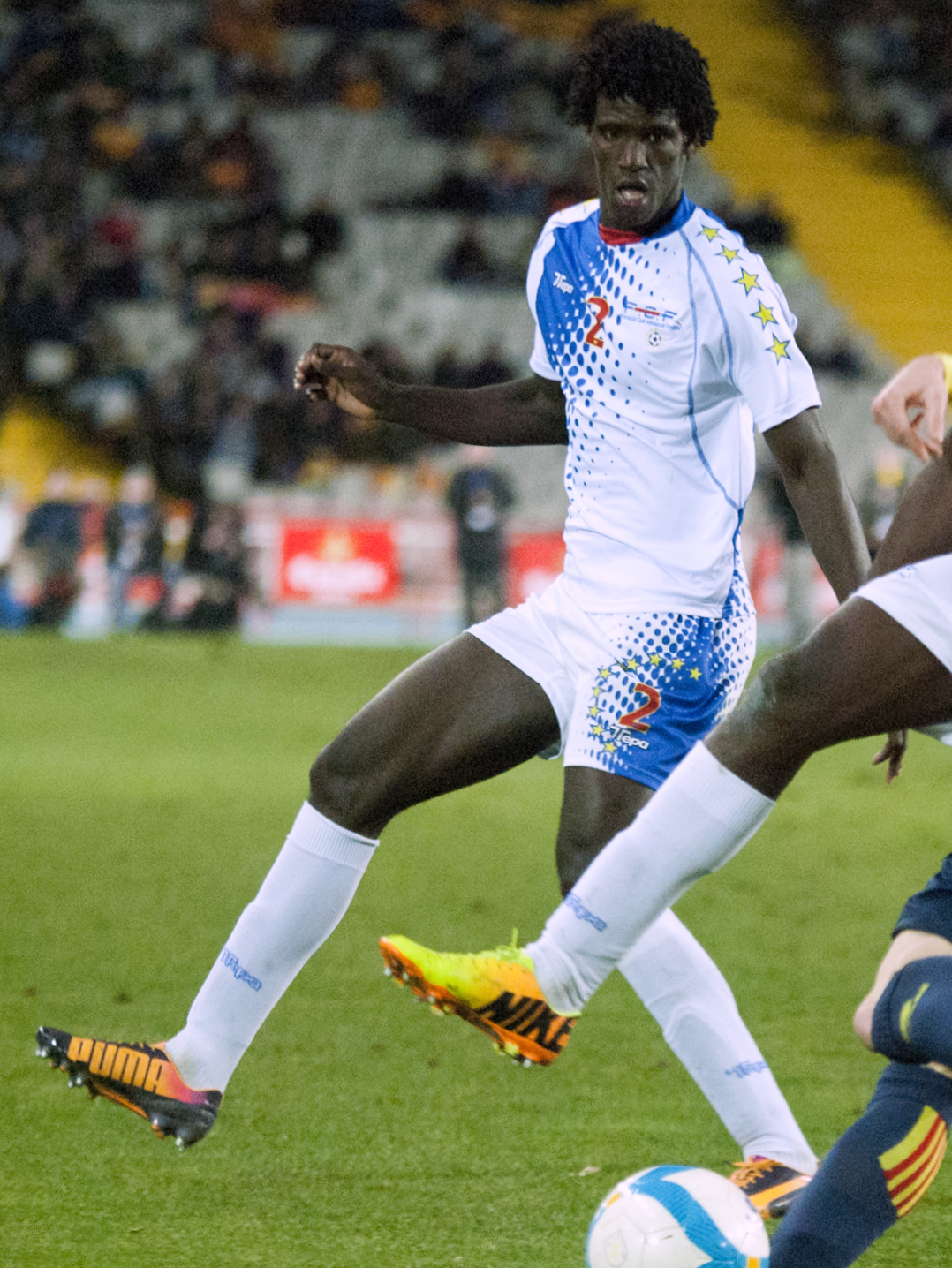
After impressing during the pre-season, youth team player Pecks was selected by Paulo Alves to integrate Gil Vicente's squad for the 2012–13 season.

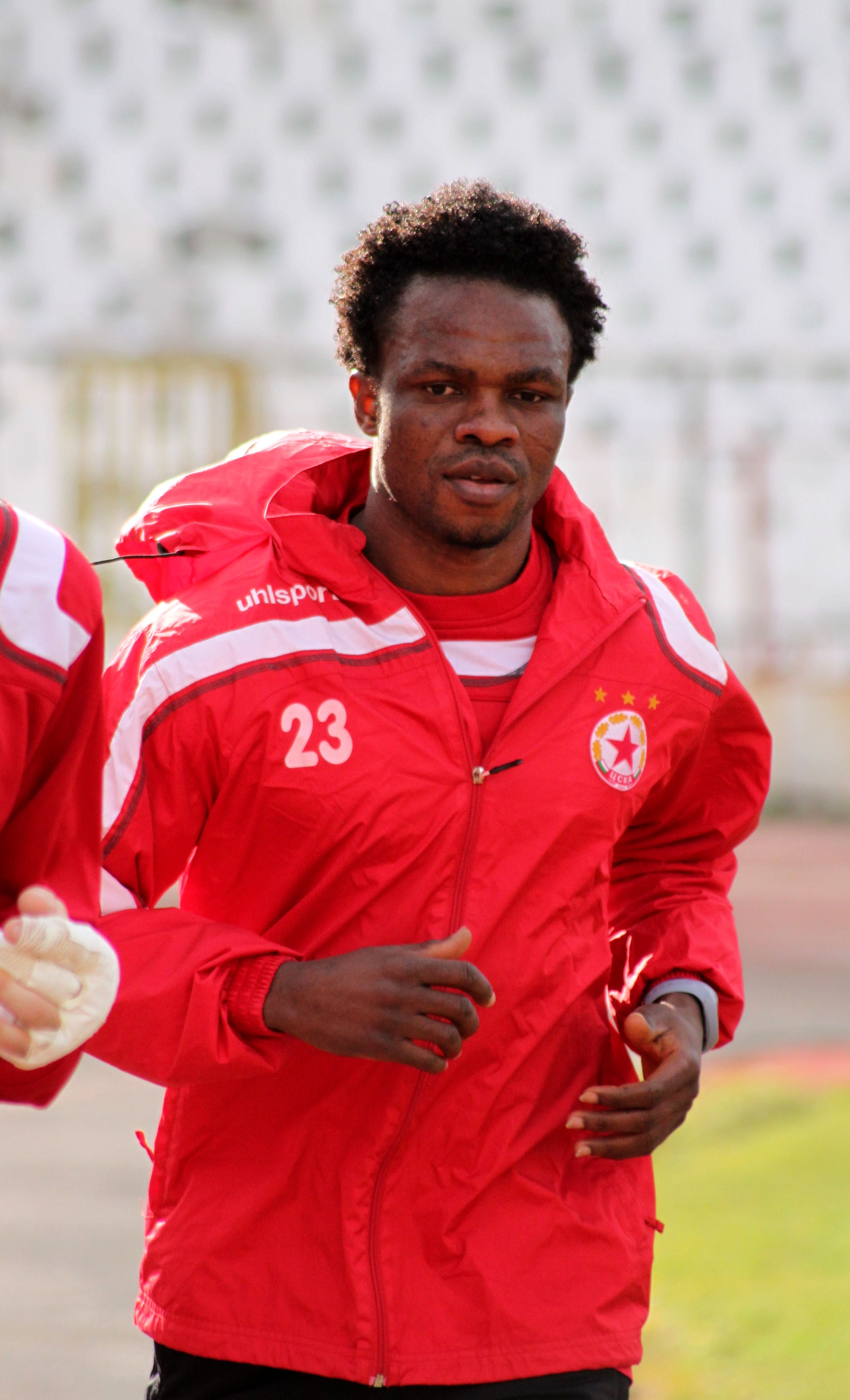
William Tiero joined the Gilistas from Saudi club Al-Qadisiyah.

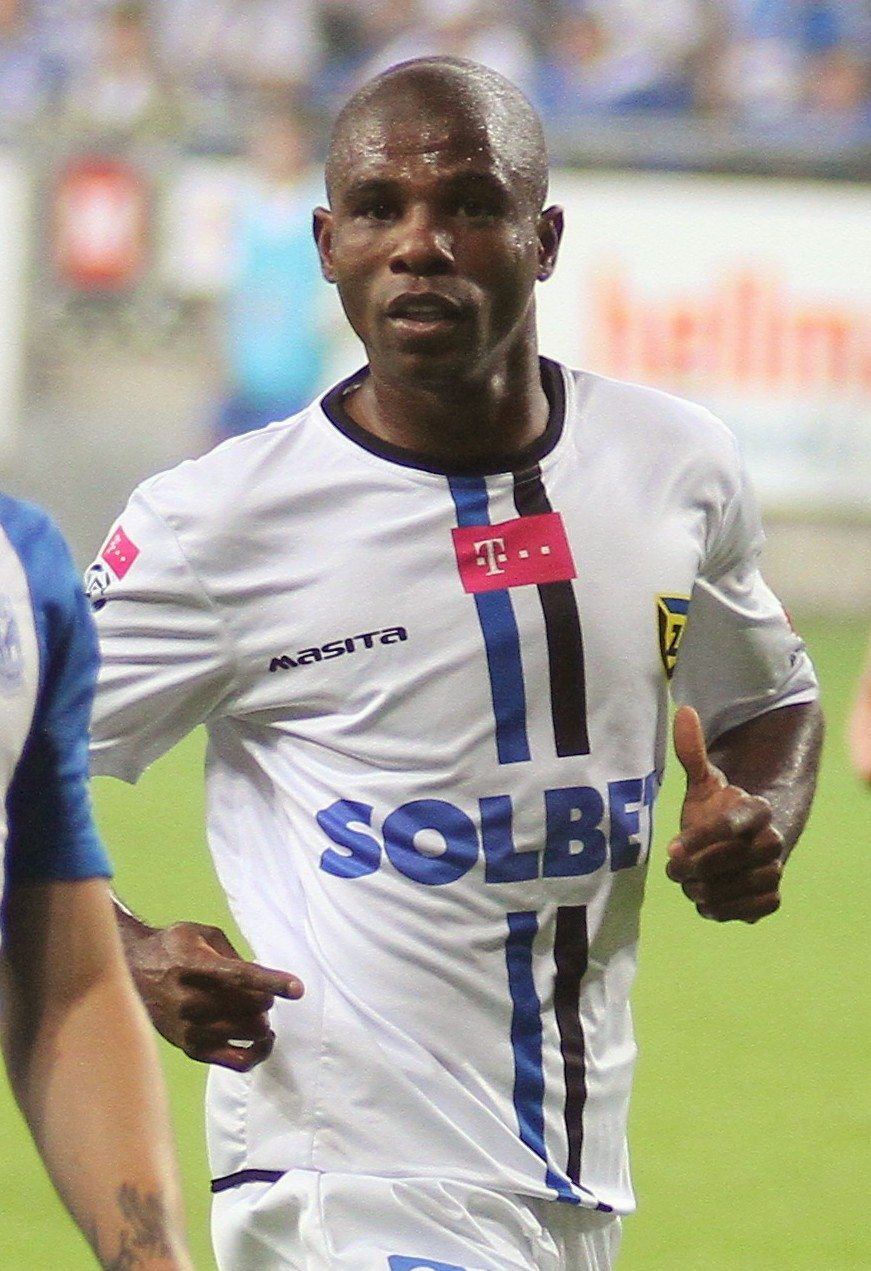
Luís Carlos scored the Gilistas' first goal of the 2012–13 league season.

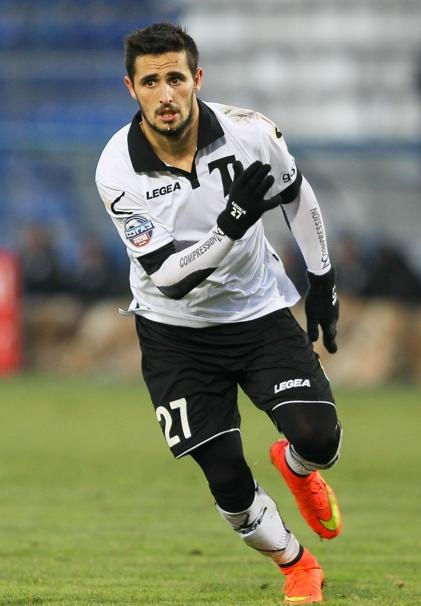
Hugo Vieira rejoined his former side on loan from Benfica during the January transfer window.

=== July ===
- 15: Gil Vicente begin their pre-season campaign with a 1–0 loss to Marítimo. A 13th-minute strike from Olberdam sealed the Madeiran side's victory.
- 18: Gil Vicente claim their first victory of pre-season, after 2–0 win over Penafiel. Cláudio, and Pecks scored the Gilistas goals.
- 21: Os Galos draw their third game of their pre-season campaign after a 1–1 tie at the hands of Sporting da Covilhã.
- 25: Gil Vicente draw their second consecutive game of their pre-season campaign after a 0–0 draw at the hands of Moreirense.
- 28: In a pre-season tournament organised by Gil Vicente's shirt sponsor Crédito Agrícola, Benfica defeat the Gilistas 5–2 to win the first annual Crédito Agrícola Cup. Cláudio and Pedro Pereira scored Gil Vicente's goals.

=== August ===
- 13: Gil Vicente announce the signing of Brazilian full-back Luciano Amaral from Brazilian side Treze.
- 14: After impressing during the pre-season, Gil Vicente's chairman António Fiúsa announces that the club have renewed Cape Verdean central defender Pecks' contract by extending his stay with the Gilistas until the end of the 2016–17 season, and increasing Pecks' buyout clause to €10 million.
- 15: Ghanaian midfielder William Tiero joins the Gilistas from Saudi club Al-Qadisiyah.
- 19: Gil Vicente open their 2012–13 league campaign with a 0–0 draw at home to league champions Porto.
- 26: Gil Vicente draw their second consecutive game of the season, by finishing goalless against Marítimo.
- 29: Gil Vicente draws second division side Naval 1º de Maio in the second round of the Taça da Liga.

=== September ===
- 2: Gil Vicente draw their third consecutive game of the season against Vitória de Setúbal.
- 9: Gil Vicente draw their first leg Taça da Liga tie against Naval 1º de Maio. The Navalistas opened the scoring on 54 minutes through André Carvalhas. Brito equalized ten minutes later to tie the game.
- 24: Gil Vicente suffer their first loss of the season, away to Sporting CP. The Gilistas opened the scoring on seven minutes through Brazilian winger Luís Carlos. Sporting CP equalized on 74 minutes through Diego Capel, and took the lead five minutes from the end through Dutch center-forward Ricky van Wolfswinkel to claim a 2–1 win.
- 30: Gil Vicente win their first league game of the season in an enthralling 4–3 victory over newly promoted Moreirense. Moreirense had twice taken the lead in the first half, but the Gilistas clawed back to tie the game before half time through an André Cunha brace, and a spot kick from Brazilian central defender Cláudio. The game's winning goal came 12 minutes from time, as a Cláudio free kick found an on rushing Halisson who headed past Ricardo Ribeiro to secure Gil Vicente's first league win of the season.

=== October ===
- 7: Gil Vicente win their first away game of the season with a 1–0 victory against Nacional. This was their first win at the Estádio da Madeira since 2002.
- 13: Gil Vicente are eliminated from the Taça da Liga after suffering a 2–1 home defeat at the hands of Naval 1º de Maio. Cape Verdean forward Brito opened the scoring for the Gilistas, before João Pedro equalized for the visitors. The winning goal of the game, came before the interval through center forward Tozé Marreco.
- 20: Extra-time goals from Cláudio and Ramazotti see Gil Vicente defeat third division side Gondomar in the third round of the Taça de Portugal.
- 27: Benfica inflict on Gil Vicente their second loss of the season after a 3–0 victory over the Barcelos side.

=== November ===
- 3: Gil Vicente are defeated by Minho rivals Braga, 3–1. Former player Zé Luís opened the scoring for the Arsenalistas. Kalidou Yéro equalized in the second half, before Alan's penalty and Hugo Viana's 89th-minute strike sealed Braga's victory.
- 9: Paços de Ferreira inflict on Gil Vicente a third consecutive loss. Vitorino Antunes' 45th-minute strike sees Gil Vicente slump to 11th in the table.
- 25: Gil Vicente extend their winless run to four after suffering a late equalizer at the hands of Académica de Coimbra. In a game taking place at the Estádio Cidade de Coimbra, the Estudantes opened the scoring on 49 minutes through Flávio Ferreira. The Gilistas equalized on 68 minutes through Pio, before Cláudio put Gil Vicente in front for the first time in the game on 73 minutes. With the game drawing to a close, Académica equalized through Edinho to earn the home side a point.

=== December ===
- 2: The Gilistas progress to the quarter-finals of the Taça de Portugal after claiming a 1–0 victory over Segunda Liga side Oliveirense. Kalidou Yéro's 30th-minute strike was the difference maker which set up a quarter-final tie against Paços de Ferreira.

=== January ===
- 9: Gil Vicente announce the signing of Benfica full-back Luís Martins.
- 13: Rio Ave inflict on Gil Vicente their sixth loss of the league season. Gil Vicente's defeat extended their winless run to twelve.
- 18: Os Galos announce the signings of Portuguese midfielder Paulo Jorge, and Argentine striker Gabriel Rodríguez. Paulo Jorge returned to Portugal after a two-year stint with Saudi side Al-Ittihad, whereas Gabriel Rodríguez joined the Barcelos side from Chilean side Audax Italiano.
- 20: The Gilistas record their second away victory of the season and win their first game in thirteen matches after defeating Estoril at the Estádio António Coimbra da Mota. Luís Leal opened the scoring for the Canarinhos on 16 minutes. Cláudio equalized from the penalty spot 11 minutes later. Luís Carlos sealed Gil Vicente's victory seven minutes from time to claim their first victory in three months.
- 22: After failing to establish himself at Benfica, Hugo Vieira rejoins Gil Vicente on loan until the end of the season.
- 28: Paulo Alves' side suffer a heavy away defeat at the hands of Porto. Gil Vicente's defeat sees them fall one place in the table to 12th.

=== February ===
- 3: The Galos win their fourth league match of the season, against Marítimo, with goals from João Vilela, Luís Carlos and Hugo Vieira. The win places Gil Vicente into 11th position in the league table.

=== May ===
- 19: Despite suffering a 3–1 home defeat to Estoril on the final day of the Primeira Liga season, the Gilistas narrowly avoid relegation to the Segunda Liga after Moreirense's away defeat to Benfica ensured Gil Vicente's stay in the Primeira Liga for another season. The club finished in 13th place.
- 21: Two days after avoiding relegation to the Segunda Liga, Gil Vicente chairman António Fiúza announces that the club has parted ways with manager Paulo Alves.

== Club ==
=== Coaching staff ===
Position	Staff
Manager	(Portugal) Paulo Alves
Assistant Manager	(Portugal) Pedro Pinto
Technical Director	(Portugal) Lim Costa
Goalkeeper Coach	(Portugal) Fernando Baptista
Fitness Coach	(Portugal) Ricardo Vaz
Physio	(Portugal) Frederico Neto
Physio	(Portugal) Lino Silva
Scout	(Portugal) Alberto Silva
Scout	(Portugal) Daniel Pacheco
Medical Director	(Portugal) José Albino
Kit man	(Portugal) Luís Figo
Head of Youth Development	(Portugal) Carlos Celso

=== Other information ===
Chairman	(Portugal) António Fiúsa
Sporting Director	(Brazil) Aloísio
Ground (capacity and dimensions)	Estádio Cidade de Barcelos (12,504 / 106 x 68 metres)
Training Ground	Estádio Cidade de Barcelos

== First team squad ==
Stats as of the end of the 2012–13 season. Games played and goals scored only refers to appearances and goals in domestic league campaigns.

No.	Name	Nationality	Position(s)	Since	Date of birth (age)	Signed from	Games	Goals
Goalkeepers
1	Adriano Facchini	(Brazil)	GK	2011	12 March 1983 (aged 30)	(Portugal) União da Madeira	55	0
79	Vítor Murta	(Portugal)	GK	2010	21 July 1979 (aged 33)	(Portugal) Vizela	19	0
90	Lúcio	(Brazil)	GK	2012	18 April 1990 (aged 23)	(Brazil) Marcílio Dias	0	0
Defenders
2	Bruno Pinheiro	(Portugal)	CB / DM	2012	21 August 1987 (aged 25)	(Poland) Widzew Łódź	1	0
3	João Pedro	(Portugal)	LB	2010	15 August 1980 (aged 32)	(Cyprus) Ethnikos Achna	116	6
4	Sandro Cunha	(Portugal)	CB / RB	2009	5 December 1982 (aged 30)	(Portugal) Vizela	76	6
5	Luís Martins	(Portugal)	LB	2013	10 June 1992 (aged 20)	(Portugal) Benfica	17	0
6	Daniel Faria	(Portugal)	CB / RB	2006	29 March 1987 (aged 26)	(Portugal) Youth System	71	1
19	Vítor Vinha	(Portugal)	LB	2013	11 November 1986 (aged 26)	(Portugal) Olhanense	8	0
20	Éder Sciola	(Brazil)	RB	2011	25 September 1985 (aged 27)	(Brazil) Ituano	28	0
22	Elízio Albues	(Brazil)	LB	2012	22 February 1988 (aged 25)	(Brazil) Grêmio Anápolis	0	0
23	Pecks	(Cape Verde)	CB	2012	10 April 1993 (aged 20)	(Portugal) Youth System	6	0
27	Paulo Arantes (VC)	(Portugal)	LB / RB	2005	15 November 1986 (aged 26)	(Portugal) Youth System	107	0
33	Halisson	(Brazil)	CB	2011	28 June 1985 (aged 27)	(Romania) Târgu Mureș	48	1
44	Cláudio	(Brazil)	CB	2010	17 August 1977 (aged 35)	(Portugal) Trofense	73	13
83	Luciano Amaral	(Brazil)	LB	2012	20 October 1982 (aged 30)	(Brazil) Treze	8	0
Midfielders
8	Luan	(Brazil)	DM	2012	30 December 1988 (aged 24)	(Brazil) Audax São Paulo	0	0
10	André Cunha (C)	(Portugal)	CM / LM	2010	16 February 1978 (aged 35)	(Portugal) Vizela	93	6
18	Thomas Agyiri	(Ghana)	CM	2012	28 April 1994 (aged 19)	(England) Manchester City	0	0
21	Pio	(Brazil)	CM	2012	23 January 1988 (aged 25)	(Brazil) Guaratinguetá	12	1
25	César Peixoto	(Portugal)	AM / LB / LM	2012	12 May 1980 (aged 33)	Free agent	32	1
28	Djalma	(Brazil)	AM / CM	2012	15 April 1988 (aged 25)	(Brazil) Santo André	6	0
66	Luís Manuel	(Portugal)	CM / DM	2010	25 June 1981 (aged 31)	(Portugal) Lousada	97	0
77	João Vilela	(Portugal)	AM / CM	2013	9 September 1985 (aged 27)	(Iran) Tractor Sazi	128	19
80	William Tiero	(Ghana)	CM	2012	3 December 1980 (aged 32)	(Saudi Arabia) Al-Qadisiyah	12	0
Forwards
7	Pedro Pereira	(Portugal)	LW / RW	2012	3 January 1984 (aged 29)	(Portugal) Desportivo das Aves	12	0
9	Gabriel Rodríguez	(Argentina)	CF	2013	5 February 1989 (aged 24)	(Chile) Audax Italiano	3	0
11	Valdinho	(Angola)	LW / RW	2013	6 October 1989 (aged 23)	(Portugal) Desportivo das Aves	9	0
12	Leonardo Cipriano	(Brazil)	CF	2012	9 April 1988 (aged 25)	(Brazil) Santa Cruz	4	0
13	Brito	(Cape Verde)	LW / RW	2012	6 November 1987 (aged 25)	(Portugal) Torreense	24	1
15	Kalidou Yéro	(Senegal)	CF	2011	19 August 1991 (aged 21)	(Portugal) Porto	24	4
17	Rafa Silva	(Brazil)	CF	2012	8 October 1990 (aged 22)	(Brazil) Portuguesa	6	1
58	Luís Carlos	(Brazil)	AM / LW / RW	2010	15 June 1987 (aged 25)	(Brazil) Santo André	79	15
70	Hugo Vieira	(Portugal)	CF / LW / RW	2013	25 July 1988 (aged 24)	(Portugal) Benfica	76	24
81	Paulo Jorge	(Portugal)	RB / RW	2013	5 May 1981 (aged 32)	(Saudi Arabia) Al-Ittihad	8	0
99	Ramazotti	(Brazil)	CF	2012	9 August 1988 (aged 24)	(Switzerland) Zürich	3	0

== Transfers ==
=== In ===
==== Summer ====
No.	Pos	Player	Transferred from	Date	Fee
33	CB	(Brazil) Halisson	(Brazil) Noroeste	4 May 2012	Loan
13	CF	(Cape Verde) Brito	(Portugal) Torreense	22 May 2012	Free
99	CF	(Brazil) Ramazotti	(Switzerland) Zürich	13 June 2012	Free
22	LB	(Brazil) Elízio Albues	(Portugal) Penafiel	14 June 2012	Loan
90	GK	(Brazil) Lúcio	(Brazil) Portuguesa	21 June 2012	Loan
17	CF	(Brazil) Rafa Silva	(Brazil) Portuguesa	21 June 2012	Loan
21	CM	(Brazil) Pio	(Brazil) Monte Azul	29 June 2012	Loan
8	DM	(Brazil) Luan	(Brazil) Audax São Paulo	12 July 2012	Free
12	CF	(Brazil) Leonardo Cipriano	(Brazil) Santa Cruz	16 July 2012	Free
80	CM	(Ghana) William Tiero	(Saudi Arabia) Al-Qadisiyah	13 August 2012	Free
83	LB	(Brazil) Luciano Amaral	(Brazil) Treze	13 August 2012	Free
18	CM	(Ghana) Thomas Agyiri	(England) Manchester City	1 September 2012	Loan
2	CB	(Portugal) Bruno Pinheiro	(Poland) Widzew Łódź		Free
7	RW	(Portugal) Pedro Pereira	(Portugal) Desportivo das Aves		Free
28	AM	(Brazil) Djalma	(Brazil) Santo André		Loan

==== Winter ====
No.	Pos	Player	Transferred from	Date	Fee
77	AM	(Portugal) João Vilela	(Iran) Tractor Sazi	11 December 2012	Free
11	LW	(Angola) Valdinho	(Portugal) Desportivo das Aves	11 December 2012	Free
19	LB	(Portugal) Vítor Vinha	(Portugal) Olhanense	3 January 2013	Free
5	LB	(Portugal) Luís Martins	(Portugal) Benfica	9 January 2013	Free
81	RW	(Portugal) Paulo Jorge	(Saudi Arabia) Al-Qadisiyah	18 January 2013	Free
9	CF	(Argentina) Gabriel Rodríguez	(Chile) Audax Italiano	18 January 2013	Free
70	RW	(Portugal) Hugo Vieira	(Portugal) Benfica	22 January 2013	Loan

=== Out ===
==== Summer ====
No.	Pos	Player	Transferred from	Date	Fee
70	LW	(Portugal) Hugo Vieira	(Portugal) Benfica	17 May 2012	Free
77	AM	(Portugal) João Vilela	(Iran) Tractor Sazi	29 May 2012	Free
21	GK	(Portugal) Jorge Baptista	(Portugal) Sporting da Covilhã	9 July 2012	Free
5	DM	(Portugal) Rui Faria	(Portugal) Vilaverdense		Loan
9	LW	(Portugal) Tó Barbosa	(Portugal) Varzim		Loan
19	CM	(Brazil) Mauro	(Portugal) Braga		Free
30	CF	(Portugal) Bruno Filipe	(Portugal) Vilaverdense		Free
	LM	(Portugal) Ruca	(Portugal) Oliveira de Frades		Loan
	LW	(Cape Verde) Rodi	(Portugal) Famalicão		Free
	CM	(Venezuela) Venú	(Portugal) Santa Maria		Free
	GK	(Cape Verde) Edivaldo Rodrigues	(Portugal) Oeiras		Loan
	GK	(Portugal) Flávio Costa	(Portugal) Melgacense		Free
	CB	(Portugal) Ricardo Coutinho	(Portugal) Águias de Alvelos		Free
	LB	(Portugal) Espanhol	(Portugal) Vilaverdense		Loan
	GK	(Portugal) Ricardo Cruz	(Portugal) São Veríssimo		Free
	LW	(Cape Verde) Aladino Silva	(Portugal) Oeiras		Free
	CM	(Portugal) Fábio Fernandes	(Portugal) Carvalhas		Free
	CM	(Cape Verde) Rodirley Duarte	(Portugal) Famalicão		Free
	CM	(Portugal) Rui Magalhães	(Portugal) Vila Real		Free

==== Winter ====
No.	Pos	Player	Transferred from	Date	Fee
12	CF	(Brazil) Leonardo Cipriano	(Brazil) Luverdense	7 January 2013	Free
2	CB	(Portugal) Bruno Pinheiro	(Israel) Maccabi Netanya	13 January 2013	Free
7	RW	(Portugal) Pedro Pereira	(Portugal) Desportivo das Aves	30 January 2013	Free
8	DM	(Brazil) Luan Scapolan	(Brazil) Audax São Paulo	12 February 2013	Loan
5	DM	(Portugal) Rui Faria	(Portugal) Mirandela		Loan
11	CM	(Cape Verde) Sidnei	(Angola) Recreativo do Libolo		Free
99	CF	(Brazil) Ramazotti	(Brazil) Bragantino		Free
	CB	(Portugal) Aníbal Mendonça	(Portugal) Prado		Free
	GK	(Cape Verde) Edivaldo Rodrigues	(Portugal) São Veríssimo		Loan
	CM	(Ivory Coast) Richard Aboua	(Portugal) Mortágua		Free
	CF	(Ivory Coast) Siriki Camará	(Portugal) Anadia		Free

== Pre-season and friendlies ==
=== Legend ===
Win Draw Loss

=== Matches ===
15 July 2012 Friendly	Gil Vicente	0–1	Marítimo	Barcelos
11:00 WEST		(Report)	Olberdam 13'	Stadium: Estádio Cidade de Barcelos

18 July 2012 Friendly	Penafiel	0–2	Gil Vicente	Penafiel
17:00 WEST		(Report)	Cláudio 83'; Pecks 86'	Stadium: Estádio Municipal 25 de Abril

21 July 2012 Friendly	Sporting da Covilhã	1–1	Gil Vicente	Covilhã
17:00 WEST	Tarcísio (pen.)	(Report)	Luís Carlos 12'	Stadium: Complexo Desportivo da Covilhã

25 July 2012 Friendly	Moreirense	0–0	Gil Vicente	Moreira de Cónegos
17:00 WEST		(Report)		Stadium: Parque de Jogos Comendador Joaquim de Almeida Freitas

28 July 2012 Crédito Agrícola Cup	Gil Vicente	2–5	Benfica	Barcelos
20:40 WEST	Cláudio 40'; Pereira 52'	(Report)	Mora 14', 23', 35'; Vítor 18'; Michel 67'	Stadium: Estádio Cidade de Barcelos; Referee: Cosme Machado

1 August 2012 Minho Cup	Gil Vicente	1–1 (a.e.t.) (4–5 p)	Braga	Barcelos
19:00 WEST	Pereira 1'	(Report)	Éder 90+3'	Stadium: Estádio Cidade de Barcelos
	Penalties
	(penalty scored) (penalty scored) (penalty scored) (penalty scored); Brito (penalty missed)		(penalty scored) (penalty scored) (penalty scored) (penalty scored); (penalty scored) Salino

4 August 2012 Friendly	Gil Vicente	1–3	Celta Vigo	Barcelos
17:00 WEST	Ramazotti 67'	(Report)	Cabral 37'; Aspas 76' (pen.), 88'	Stadium: Estádio Cidade de Barcelos

8 August 2012 Friendly	Gil Vicente	1–1	Rio Ave	Barcelos
18:00 WEST	Cunha 73' (pen.)	(Report)	Del Valle 43'	Stadium: Estádio Cidade de Barcelos; Referee: Carlos Macedo

11 August 2012 Friendly	Salgueiros 08	1–5	Gil Vicente	Matosinhos
18:00 WEST	Oliveira 26'	(Report)	Cláudio 9'; Yéro 40'; Cipriano 59'; Pecks 69'; Silva 81'	Stadium: Estádio do Padroense F.C.

14 August 2012 Friendly	Santa Maria	1–4	Gil Vicente	Barcelos
20:00 WEST	Oliveira 26'	(Report)	Pio (x2); Cipriano; Silva	Stadium: Estádio da Devesa

== Competitions ==
=== Legend ===
Win Draw Loss

=== Overall ===
Competition	Started round	Final position / round	First match	Last match
Primeira Liga		13th	19 August 2012	19 May 2013
Taça de Portugal	3rd round	Quarter-finals	20 October 2012	16 January 2013
Taça da Liga	2nd round		9 September 2012	13 October 2012

=== Competition record ===
Competition	Record							
Competition	G	W	D	L	GF	GA	GD	Win %
Primeira Liga	30	6	7	17	31	54	−23	20.00
Taça de Portugal	4	3	0	1	6	3	+3	75.00
Taça da Liga	2	0	1	1	2	3	−1	0.00
Total	36	9	8	19	39	60	−21	25.00

=== Primeira Liga ===
==== League table ====
Pos	Team	Pld	W	D	L	GF	GA	GD	Pts	Qualification or relegation
11	Académica	30	6	10	14	33	45	−12	28	
12	Vitória de Setúbal	30	7	5	18	30	55	−25	26	
13	Gil Vicente	30	6	7	17	31	54	−23	25 (Note: Gil Vicente ahead of Olhanense on head-to-head record; Gil Vicente–Olhanense 2–0, Olhanense–Gil Vicente 2–2)	
14	Olhanense	30	5	10	15	26	42	−16	25	
15	Moreirense (R)	30	5	9	16	30	51	−21	24	Relegation to Segunda Liga

Source: LPFP (in Portuguese)
Rules for classification: 1) Points; 2) Head-to-head points; 3) Head-to-head goal difference; 4) Head-to-head away goals scored; 5) Goal difference; 6) Matches won; 7) Goals scored; 8) Play-off.
(Note: LPFP decided that only criteria 1, 5, 6 and 7 would be applied to establish the classification during the competition.)
(R) Relegated

==== Matches ====
19 August 2012 1	Gil Vicente	0–0	Porto	Estádio Cidade de Barcelos, Barcelos
17:15 WEST		(Report)		Attendance: 8,298; Referee: Duarte Gomes

26 August 2012 2	Marítimo	0–0	Gil Vicente	Estádio dos Barreiros, Funchal
18:00 WEST		(Report)		Attendance: 3,840; Referee: Bruno Paixão

2 September 2012 3	Gil Vicente	0–0	Vitória de Setúbal	Estádio Cidade de Barcelos, Barcelos
16:00 WEST		(Report)		Attendance: 2,584; Referee: Rui Costa

24 September 2012 4	Sporting CP	2–1	Gil Vicente	Estádio José Alvalade, Lisbon
20:15 WEST	Capel 74'; Van Wolfswinkel 85'	(Report)	Luís Carlos 7'	Attendance: 25,523; Referee: Vasco Santos

30 September 2012 5	Gil Vicente	4–3	Moreirense	Estádio Cidade de Barcelos, Barcelos
16:00 WEST	Cunha 20', 30'; Cláudio 45' (pen.); Halisson 78'	(Report)	Ghilas 17', 43'; Vinicius 33'	Attendance: 3,963; Referee: João Ferreira

7 October 2012 6	Nacional	0–1	Gil Vicente	Estádio da Madeira, Funchal
16:00 WEST		(Report)	Silva 53'	Attendance: 1,152; Referee: Hugo Miguel

27 October 2012 7	Gil Vicente	0–3	Benfica	Estádio Cidade de Barcelos, Barcelos
20:30 WEST		(Report)	Lima 2'; Luisinho 27'; Gomes 45'	Attendance: 7,242; Referee: Vasco Santos

3 November 2012 8	Braga	3–1	Gil Vicente	Estádio Municipal de Braga, Braga
18:30 WET	Zé Luís 17'; Alan 64' (pen.); Viana 89'	(Report)	Yéro 55'	Attendance: 10,437; Referee: Rui Silva

9 November 2012 9	Gil Vicente	0–1	Paços de Ferreira	Estádio Cidade de Barcelos, Barcelos
20:15 WET		(Report)	Antunes 77'	Attendance: 2,178; Referee: Marco Ferreira

25 November 2012 10	Académica de Coimbra	2–2	Gil Vicente	Estádio Cidade de Coimbra, Coimbra
18:00 WET	Ferreira 49'; Edinho 84'	(Report)	Pio 68'; Cláudio 73'	Attendance: 2,258; Referee: João Capela

9 December 2012 11	Gil Vicente	1–2	Beira-Mar	Estádio Cidade de Barcelos, Barcelos
16:00 WET	Cláudio 62' (pen.)	(Report)	Serginho 20'; Balboa 87'	Attendance: 2,061; Referee: Manuel Oliveira

15 December 2012 12	Olhanense	2–2	Gil Vicente	Estádio José Arcanjo, Olhão
16:00 WET	Piloto 67'; Brandão 78'	(Report)	Yéro 4'; Luís Carlos 65'	Attendance: 1,127; Referee: Rui Costa

5 January 2013 13	Gil Vicente	0–0	Vitória de Guimarães	Estádio Cidade de Barcelos, Barcelos
16:00 WET		(Report)		Attendance: 2,891; Referee: Bruno Paixão

13 January 2013 14	Gil Vicente	0–1	Rio Ave	Estádio Cidade de Barcelos, Barcelos
16:00 WET		(Report)	Marcelo 34'	Attendance: 2,657; Referee: Manuel Mota

20 January 2013 15	Estoril	1–2	Gil Vicente	Estádio António Coimbra da Mota, Estoril
16:00 WET	Leal 16'	(Report)	Cláudio 27' (pen.); Luís Carlos 83'	Attendance: 794; Referee: Bruno Esteves

28 January 2013 16	Porto	5–0	Gil Vicente	Estádio do Dragão, Porto
20:00 WET	Danilo 4'; Vinha 11' (o.g.); Defour 54'; Varela 75'; Martínez 90'	(Report)		Attendance: 24,202; Referee: Paulo Baptista

3 February 2013 17	Gil Vicente	4–2	Marítimo	Estádio Cidade de Barcelos, Barcelos
16:00 WET	Vilela 7' (pen.); Luís Carlos 36'; Vieira 72', 77'	(Report)	Simão 50' (pen.); Miranda 90'	Attendance: 2,289; Referee: João Ferreira

10 February 2013 18	Vitória de Setúbal	1–0	Gil Vicente	Estádio do Bonfim, Setúbal
16:00 WET	Santos 25'	(Report)		Attendance: 2,387; Referee: Hugo Miguel

16 February 2013 19	Gil Vicente	2–3	Sporting CP	Estádio Cidade de Barcelos, Barcelos
20:15 WET	Vieira 20', 53'	(Report)	Bruma 1'; Ilori 6'; Capel 63'	Attendance: 3,962; Referee: Artur Soares Dias

24 February 2013 20	Moreirense	0–0	Gil Vicente	Parque de Jogos Comendador Joaquim de Almeida Freitas, Moreira de Cónegos
16:00 WET		(Report)		Attendance: 1,750; Referee: Marco Ferreira

3 March 2013 21	Gil Vicente	1–2	Nacional	Estádio Cidade de Barcelos, Barcelos
16:00 WET	Luís Carlos 15'	(Report)	Mexer 54'; Da Costa 89'	Attendance: 2,384; Referee: João Capela

10 March 2013 22	Benfica	5–0	Gil Vicente	Estádio da Luz, Lisbon
16:00 WET	Pereira 12'; Salvio 22'; Melgarejo 33'; Lima 65'; Gaitán 90'	(Report)		Attendance: 33,708; Referee: Duarte Gomes

15 March 2013 23	Gil Vicente	1–3	Braga	Estádio Cidade de Barcelos, Barcelos
20:00 WET	Vieira 61'	(Report)	Viana 45', 81'; Zé Luís 83'	Attendance: 3,682; Referee: Carlos Xistra

29 March 2013 24	Paços de Ferreira	3–2	Gil Vicente	Estádio da Mata Real, Paços de Ferreira
20:00 WET	Manuel José 15' (pen.), 56'; Vítor 35'	(Report)	Vieira 24'; Yéro 82'	Attendance: 1,125; Referee: Olegário Benquerença

7 April 2013 25	Gil Vicente	2–1	Académica de Coimbra	Estádio Cidade de Barcelos, Barcelos
16:00 WEST	Brito 62'; Yéro 68'	(Report)	Eduardo 41'	Attendance: 4,728; Referee: João Ferreira

21 April 2013 26	Beira-Mar	1–0	Gil Vicente	Estádio Municipal de Aveiro, Aveiro
16:00 WEST	Yazalde 59'	(Report)		Attendance: 5,376; Referee: Jorge Sousa

28 April 2013 27	Gil Vicente	2–0	Olhanense	Estádio Cidade de Barcelos, Barcelos
16:00 WEST	Vieira 23'; Peixoto 49' (pen.)	(Report)		Attendance: 7,052; Referee: Artur Soares Dias

5 May 2013 28	Vitória de Guimarães	3–1	Gil Vicente	Estádio D. Afonso Henriques, Guimarães
18:00 WEST	Soudani 15'; Olímpio 75' (pen.); Rodrigues 90'	(Report)	Vieira 26'	Attendance: 26,340; Referee: Marco Ferreira

11 May 2013 29	Rio Ave	2–1	Gil Vicente	Estádio dos Arcos, Vila do Conde
18:15 WEST	Rodríguez 22'; Hassan 81' (pen.)	(Report)	Vilela 66'	Attendance: 1,220; Referee: Vasco Santos

19 May 2013 30	Gil Vicente	1–3	Estoril	Estádio Cidade de Barcelos, Barcelos
18:30 WEST	S. Cunha 25'	(Report)	Vitória 55', 67' (pen.); Leal 74'	Attendance: 7,485; Referee: Pedro Proença

=== Taça de Portugal ===
==== Matches ====
20 October 2012 3	Gondomar	0–2 (a.e.t.)	Gil Vicente	Estádio de São Miguel, Gondomar
15:00 WEST		(Report)	Ramazotti 104'; Luís Carlos 112'	Attendance: 850; Referee: Carlos Xistra

18 November 2012 4	Mirandela	1–2 (a.e.t.)	Gil Vicente	Estádio São Sebastião, Mirandela
14:00 WET	Inzaghi 90'	(Report)	Pecks 65'; Cláudio 118' (pen.)	Referee: Jorge Tavares

2 December 2012 5	Gil Vicente	1–0	Oliveirense	Estádio Cidade de Barcelos, Barcelos
15:00 WET	Yéro 30'	(Report)		Attendance: 1,000; Referee: Pedro Proença

16 January 2013 Quarter-finals	Paços de Ferreira	2–1	Gil Vicente	Estádio da Mata Real, Paços de Ferreira
18:45 WET	Yéro 18' (o.g.); Caetano 90'	(Report)	Vilela 72'	Attendance: 500; Referee: Carlos Xistra

=== Taça da Liga ===
==== Matches ====
===== Second round =====
9 September 2012 First leg	Naval 1º de Maio	1–1	Gil Vicente	Estádio Municipal José Bento Pessoa, Figueira da Foz
18:00 WEST	Carvalhas 54'	(Report)	Brito 64'	Attendance: 246; Referee: Jorge Sousa

13 October 2012 Second leg	Gil Vicente	1–2	Naval 1º de Maio	Estádio Cidade de Barcelos, Barcelos
16:00 WEST	Brito 11'	(Report)	João Pedro 16'; Marreco 40'	Attendance: 1,074; Referee: Manuel Mota

== Statistics ==
=== Appearances ===
No.	Pos.	Name	League		Cup		League Cup		Total		Discipline	
No.	Pos.	Name	Apps	Goals	Apps	Goals	Apps	Goals	Apps	Goals	Yellow card	Red card
1	GK	(Brazil) Adriano Facchini	24(1)	0	4	0	2	0	30(1)	0	3	0
2	DF	(Portugal) Bruno Pinheiro	0(1)	0	0(2)	0	0	0	0(3)	0	0	0
3	DF	(Portugal) João Pedro	5	0	2	0	0	0	7	0	2	0
4	DF	(Portugal) Sandro Cunha	12(3)	1	1(1)	0	0	0	13(4)	1	4	0
5	DF	(Portugal) Luís Martins	15(2)	0	1	0	0	0	16(2)	0	4	0
6	DF	(Portugal) Daniel Faria	4	0	0	0	0	0	4	0	3	0
7	FW	(Portugal) Pedro Pereira	7(5)	0	2(1)	0	1(1)	0	10(7)	0	5	0
8	MF	(Brazil) Luan	0	0	0	0	0	0	0	0	0	0
9	FW	(Argentina) Gabriel Rodríguez	0(3)	0	0	0	0	0	0(3)	0	0	0
10	MF	(Portugal) André Cunha	26(2)	2	2(1)	0	2	0	30(3)	2	5	0
11	FW	(Angola) Valdinho	2(7)	0	0(1)	0	1(1)	1	3(9)	1	0	0
12	FW	(Brazil) Leonardo Cipriano	1(3)	0	0	0	0	0	1(3)	0	0	0
13	FW	(Cape Verde) Brito	12(12)	1	1(1)	0	1(1)	2	14(14)	3	2	0
15	FW	(Senegal) Kalidou Yéro	12(6)	4	3(1)	1	0(1)	0	15(8)	5	5	0
17	FW	(Brazil) Rafael Silva	5(1)	1	0	0	1	0	6(1)	1	1	0
18	MF	(Ghana) Thomas Agyiri	0	0	0	0	0	0	0	0	0	0
19	DF	(Portugal) Vítor Vinha	8	0	1	0	0	0	9	0	2	0
20	DF	(Brazil) Éder Sciola	9(7)	0	2	0	1	0	12(7)	0	3	1
21	MF	(Brazil) Pio	9(3)	1	3(1)	0	1	0	13(4)	1	5	0
22	DF	(Brazil) Elízio Albues	0	0	0	0	0	0	0	0	0	0
23	DF	(Cape Verde) Pecks	5	0	0	0	2	1	7	1	1	0
25	MF	(Portugal) César Peixoto	20(2)	1	3(1)	0	0(1)	0	23(4)	1	9	1
27	DF	(Portugal) Paulo Arantes	11(3)	0	2	0	1	0	14(3)	0	6	0
28	MF	(Brazil) Djalma	0(6)	0	0	0	1	0	1(6)	0	0	0
33	DF	(Brazil) Halisson	23(1)	1	1	0	2	0	26(1)	1	4	0
44	DF	(Brazil) Cláudio	23(1)	4	4	1	2	0	29(1)	5	10	2
58	FW	(Brazil) Luís Carlos	21(6)	5	3(1)	1	2	0	26(7)	6	9	0
66	MF	(Portugal) Luís Manuel	22(1)	0	3	0	2	0	27(1)	0	5	0
70	FW	(Portugal) Hugo Vieira	13(1)	8	0	0	0	0	13(1)	8	4	1
77	MF	(Portugal) João Vilela	14	2	1	1	0	0	15	3	4	1
79	GK	(Portugal) Vítor Murta	6(1)	0	0	0	0	0	6(1)	0	0	1
80	MF	(Ghana) William Tiero	5(7)	0	0(1)	0	0(1)	0	5(9)	0	2	0
81	FW	(Portugal) Paulo Jorge	8	0	0	0	0	0	8	0	3	0
83	DF	(Brazil) Luciano Amaral	8	0	2	0	2	0	12	0	3	0
90	GK	(Brazil) Lúcio	0	0	0	0	0	0	0	0	0	0
99	FW	(Brazil) Ramazotti	0(3)	0	1	1	1(1)	0	2(4)	1	1	0
—	–	Own goals	–	–	–	–	–	–	–	–	–	–

=== Top scorers ===
The list is sorted by shirt number when total goals are equal.

Rnk	Pos	No.	Player	League	Cup	League Cup	Total
1	FW	70	(Portugal) Hugo Vieira	8	0	0	8
2	FW	58	(Brazil) Luís Carlos	5	1	0	6
3	FW	15	(Senegal) Kalidou Yéro	4	1	0	5
3	DF	44	(Brazil) Cláudio	4	1	0	5
5	FW	13	(Cape Verde) Brito	1	0	2	3
5	MF	77	(Portugal) João Vilela	2	1	0	3
7	MF	10	(Portugal) André Cunha	2	0	0	2
8	DF	4	(Portugal) Sandro Cunha	1	0	0	1
8	FW	11	(Angola) Valdinho	0	0	1	1
8	FW	17	(Brazil) Rafael Silva	1	0	0	1
8	MF	21	(Brazil) Pio	1	0	0	1
8	DF	23	(Cape Verde) Pecks	0	1	0	1
8	MF	25	(Portugal) César Peixoto	1	0	0	1
8	DF	33	(Brazil) Halisson	1	0	0	1
8	FW	99	(Brazil) Ramazotti	0	1	0	1
TOTALS				31	6	2	39

=== Clean sheets ===
The list is sorted by shirt number when total appearances are equal.

Rnk	Pos	No.	Player	League	Cup	League Cup	Total
1	GK	1	(Brazil) Adriano Facchini	6	1	0	7
2	GK	79	(Portugal) Vítor Murta	1	0	0	1
TOTALS				7	1	0	8

=== Summary ===
Games played	36 (30 Primeira Liga) (4 Taça de Portugal) (2 Taça da Liga)
Games won	9 (6 Primeira Liga) (3 Taça de Portugal) (0 Taça da Liga)
Games drawn	8 (7 Primeira Liga) (0 Taça de Portugal) (1 Taça da Liga)
Games lost	19 (17 Primeira Liga) (1 Taça de Portugal) (1 Taça da Liga)
Goals scored	39 (31 Primeira Liga) (6 Taça de Portugal) (2 Taça da Liga)
Goals conceded	60 (54 Primeira Liga) (3 Taça de Portugal) (3 Taça da Liga)
Goal difference	–21 (–23 Primeira Liga) (+3 Taça de Portugal) (–1 Taça da Liga)
Clean sheets	8 (7 Primeira Liga) (1 Taça de Portugal) (0 Taça da Liga)
Most appearances	33 (Portugal) André Cunha / (Brazil) Luís Carlos
Top scorer	8 (Portugal) Hugo Vieira
