= List of Portuguese football transfers summer 2012 =

This is a List of Portuguese football transfers summer 2012. The summer transfer window opened on 1 July and closed at midnight on 31 August. Only moves involving Primeira Liga clubs are listed. Players without a club may join a club at any time, either during or in between transfer windows.

== Transfers ==
Date	Name	Moving from	Moving to	Fee
11 January 2012	(Cape Verde) Djaniny	(Portugal) União de Leiria	(Portugal) Benfica	Undisclosed
23 January 2012	(Portugal) Salvador Agra	(Portugal) Olhanense	(Spain) Real Betis	€200,000
30 January 2012	(Portugal) André Pires	(Portugal) Belenenses	(Portugal) Beira-Mar	Undisclosed
18 February 2012	(Portugal) José Coelho	(Portugal) Benfica	(Moldova) Sheriff Tiraspol	Free
3 April 2012	(Morocco) Zakaria Labyad	(Netherlands) PSV Eindhoven	(Portugal) Sporting CP	Free
13 May 2012	(Brazil) Airton	(Portugal) Benfica	(Brazil) Flamengo	Loan
14 May 2012	(Guinea-Bissau) Éder	(Portugal) Académica de Coimbra	(Portugal) SC Braga	Undisclosed
15 May 2012	(Portugal) Fernando Alexandre	(Portugal) SC Braga	(Portugal) Olhanense	Loan
16 May 2012	(Brazil) Lucas Patinho	(Brazil) Fluminense	(Portugal) Sporting CP	Loan
17 May 2012	(Colombia) Fredy Guarín	(Portugal) FC Porto	(Italy) Inter Milan	€11,000,000
17 May 2012	(Portugal) Hugo Vieira	(Portugal) Gil Vicente	(Portugal) Benfica	Free
18 May 2012	(Mozambique) Mexer	(Portugal) Sporting CP	(Portugal) Nacional	Free
21 May 2012	(Malaysia) Nazmi Faiz	(Malaysia) Harimau Muda A	(Portugal) Beira-Mar	Free
22 May 2012	(Cape Verde) Brito	(Portugal) Torreense	(Portugal) Gil Vicente	Free
22 May 2012	(Saudi Arabia) Saleh Al-Shehri	(Saudi Arabia) Al-Ahli SC	(Portugal) Beira-Mar	Free
23 May 2012	(Australia) Caleb Patterson-Sewell	(Portugal) Atlético CP	(Portugal) Vitória de Setúbal	Free
23 May 2012	(Brazil) Fabiano	(Portugal) Olhanense	(Portugal) FC Porto	€480,000
24 May 2012	(Brazil) Eduardo Gottardi	(Portugal) União de Leiria	(Portugal) Nacional	Free
24 May 2012	(Netherlands) Ola John	(Netherlands) Twente	(Portugal) Benfica	€9,000,000
24 May 2012	(Portugal) João Pereira	(Portugal) Sporting CP	(Spain) Valencia	€3,600,000
25 May 2012	(Portugal) Mário Felgueiras	(Portugal) SC Braga	(Romania) Cluj	Free
26 May 2012	(Portugal) André Pires	(Portugal) Beira-Mar	(Portugal) SC Braga	Undisclosed
28 May 2012	(Portugal) Diogo Valente	(Portugal) Académica de Coimbra	(Romania) Cluj	Free
28 May 2012	(Uruguay) Cristian Rodríguez	(Portugal) FC Porto	(Spain) Atlético Madrid	Free
29 May 2012	(Portugal) João Vilela	(Portugal) Gil Vicente	(Iran) Tractor Sazi	Free
29 May 2012	(Portugal) Anselmo	(Portugal) Nacional	(Iran) Tractor Sazi	Free
29 May 2012	(Portugal) Bruno China	(Portugal) Rio Ave	(Portugal) Académica de Coimbra	Free
30 May 2012	(Portugal) Bruno Miguel	(Romania) Astra Ploiești	(Portugal) Estoril	Free
31 May 2012	(Portugal) Luisinho	(Portugal) Paços de Ferreira	(Portugal) Benfica	Undisclosed
31 May 2012	(Brazil) Michel	(Portugal) Paços de Ferreira	(Portugal) Benfica	Undisclosed
31 May 2012	(Portugal) André Teixeira	(Portugal) FC Porto	(Portugal) Belenenses	Free
1 June 2012	(Cape Verde) Gégé	(Portugal) SC Covilhã	(Portugal) Marítimo	Free
1 June 2012	(Portugal) Paulo Sérgio	(Portugal) Vitória de Guimarães	(Cyprus) AEL Limassol	Free
5 June 2012	(Portugal) Hugo Leal	(Portugal) Vitória de Setúbal	(Portugal) Estoril	Free
5 June 2012	(Brazil) Júnior Caiçara	(Portugal) Gil Vicente	(Bulgaria) Ludogorets Razgrad	Free
5 June 2012	(Portugal) Mano	(Greece) Levadiakos	(Portugal) Estoril	Free
5 June 2012	(Cape Verde) Babanco	(Portugal) Arouca	(Portugal) Olhanense	Free
6 June 2012	(Serbia) Igor Stefanović	(Portugal) Santa Clara	(Portugal) FC Porto	Undisclosed
7 June 2012	(Nigeria) Tope Obadeyi	(England) Bolton Wanderers	(Portugal) Rio Ave	Free
8 June 2012	(Brazil) Anderson Santana	(Portugal) Vitória de Guimarães	(Ukraine) Chornomorets Odesa	Free
8 June 2012	(Brazil) Fabinho	(Brazil) Fluminense	(Portugal) Rio Ave	Undisclosed
9 June 2012	(Portugal) André Santos	(Portugal) Sporting CP	(Spain) Deportivo La Coruña	Loan
10 June 2012	(Brazil) Nelson Pedroso	(Portugal) Desportivo das Aves	(Portugal) Vitória de Setúbal	Free
10 June 2012	(Brazil) Jô	(Portugal) União de Leiria	(Portugal) Moreirense	Free
10 June 2012	(Portugal) Ivo Pinto	(Portugal) Rio Ave	(Romania) Cluj	Undisclosed
11 June 2012	(Portugal) André André	(Portugal) Varzim	(Portugal) Nacional	Undisclosed
11 June 2012	(Slovenia) Jan Oblak	(Portugal) Benfica	(Portugal) Rio Ave	Loan
11 June 2012	(Brazil) Marcos Paulo	(Portugal) União de Leiria	(Portugal) Académica de Coimbra	Free
12 June 2012	(Portugal) Carlos Saleiro	(Switzerland) Servette	(Portugal) Académica de Coimbra	Free
12 June 2012	(Portugal) Tiago Valente	(Portugal) Desportivo das Aves	(Portugal) Paços de Ferreira	Free
13 June 2012	(Portugal) Diogo Salomão	(Portugal) Sporting CP	(Spain) Deportivo La Coruña	Loan
13 June 2012	(Brazil) Rafael Ramazotti	(Switzerland) Zürich	(Portugal) Gil Vicente	Free
13 June 2012	(Brazil) Diogo Melo	(Portugal) Académica de Coimbra	(Iran) Sanat Naft	Free
14 June 2012	(Brazil) Elízio	(Portugal) Penafiel	(Portugal) Gil Vicente	Free
14 June 2012	(Brazil) Artur	(Portugal) Beira-Mar	(Ukraine) Chornomorets Odesa	Free
15 June 2012	(Portugal) Rui Santos	(Portugal) Oeiras	(Portugal) Moreirense	Free
15 June 2012	(Portugal) Mário Mateus	(Portugal) Atlético CP	(Portugal) Moreirense	Free
15 June 2012	(Brazil) Diego Gaúcho	(Romania) Astra Ploiești	(Portugal) Moreirense	Free
16 June 2012	(Portugal) David Silva	(Scotland) Kilmarnock	(Portugal) Olhanense	Free
16 June 2012	(Brazil) Ismaily	(Portugal) Olhanense	(Portugal) SC Braga	Free
16 June 2012	(France) Florent Hanin	(Portugal) Leixões	(Portugal) SC Braga	Free
16 June 2012	(Tunisia) Selim Benachour	(Portugal) Marítimo	(Cyprus) APOEL	Free
18 June 2012	(Brazil) Otávio Silva	(Brazil) América Mineiro	(Portugal) Nacional	Free
18 June 2012	(Peru) Paolo Hurtado	(Peru) Alianza Lima	(Portugal) Paços de Ferreira	Free
18 June 2012	(Brazil) Filipe Souza	(Brazil) Bahia	(Portugal) Rio Ave	Undisclosed
19 June 2012	(Brazil) Éder Luís	(Portugal) Benfica	(Brazil) Vasco da Gama	Undisclosed
19 June 2012	(Brazil) Fellipe Bastos	(Portugal) Benfica	(Brazil) Vasco da Gama	Undisclosed
19 June 2012	(Brazil) Makelele	(Brazil) ABC	(Portugal) Académica de Coimbra	Free
20 June 2012	(Brazil) Bruno Turco	(Brazil) Macaé	(Portugal) Vitória de Setúbal	Loan
20 June 2012	(Portugal) Paulinho	(Portugal) Leixões	(Portugal) Moreirense	Undisclosed
20 June 2012	(Denmark) Daniel Wass	(Portugal) Benfica	(France) Evian	€2,000,000
20 June 2012	(Mauritius) Jonathan Bru	(Portugal) Moreirense	(Australia) Melbourne Victory	Free
20 June 2012	(Ghana) Ebo Andoh	(Portugal) FC Porto	(Cyprus) AEL Limassol	Free
21 June 2012	(Brazil) Cauê	(Portugal) Olhanense	(Romania) Vaslui	€200,000
21 June 2012	(Colombia) Ricardo Villarraga	(Colombia) Independiente Santa Fe	(Portugal) Benfica	Loan
21 June 2012	(Brazil) William Soares	(Portugal) FC Porto	(Portugal) Rio Ave	Loan
21 June 2012	(Portugal) Sérgio Semedo	(Portugal) Portimonense	(Portugal) Paços de Ferreira	Free
21 June 2012	(Brazil) Lúcio	(Brazil) Portuguesa	(Portugal) Gil Vicente	Free
21 June 2012	(Brazil) Rafael Silva	(Brazil) Portuguesa	(Portugal) Gil Vicente	Free
21 June 2012	(Portugal) Ricardo Pessoa	(Portugal) Portimonense	(Portugal) Moreirense	Free
22 June 2012	(Portugal) Rúben Ribeiro	(Portugal) Penafiel	(Portugal) Beira-Mar	Free
23 June 2012	(Brazil) Diego Lopes	(Portugal) Benfica	(Portugal) Rio Ave	Loan
24 June 2012	(Brazil) Boka	(Brazil) Noroeste	(Portugal) Olhanense	Free
24 June 2012	(Portugal) Nuno Silva	(Portugal) União da Madeira	(Portugal) Olhanense	Free
24 June 2012	(Brazil) Jefferson	(Brazil) Santa Cruz	(Portugal) Estoril	Free
25 June 2012	(Brazil) Manoel	(Portugal) Penafiel	(Portugal) SC Braga	Undisclosed
25 June 2012	(Portugal) André Costa	(Portugal) Gondomar	(Portugal) Rio Ave	Free
26 June 2012	(Portugal) Paulo Lopes	(Portugal) Feirense	(Portugal) Benfica	Free
26 June 2012	(Germany) Maximilian Haas	(Portugal) União de Leiria	(Portugal) SC Braga	Free
26 June 2012	(Brazil) Bergson	(Brazil) Grêmio	(Portugal) SC Braga	Free
26 June 2012	(Portugal) João Paulo	(Portugal) Vitória Guimarães	(China) Changchun Yatai	Free
26 June 2012	(Brazil) Rafael Batatinha	(Portugal) Tondela	(Portugal) Beira-Mar	Free
28 June 2012	(Portugal) Vitorino Antunes	(Italy) Roma	(Portugal) Paços de Ferreira	Free
28 June 2012	(Morocco) Faouzi Abdelghani	(Portugal) Vitória Guimarães	(Saudi Arabia) Ittihad	Undisclosed
28 June 2012	(Brazil) Júnior Lopes	(Brazil) Bragantino	(Portugal) Académica de Coimbra	Free
29 June 2012	(Brazil) Pio	(Brazil) Monte Azul	(Portugal) Gil Vicente	Loan
29 June 2012	(Brazil) Diego	(Portugal) Vitória de Setúbal	(Azerbaijan) Gabala	Free
29 June 2012	(Switzerland) Gelson Fernandes	(France) Saint-Étienne	(Portugal) Sporting CP	Undisclosed
29 June 2012	(Portugal) João Pedro	(Portugal) CD Aves	(Portugal) Estoril	Free
29 June 2012	(Guadeloupe) Felipe Desco	(France) Metz	(Portugal) Beira-Mar	Free
30 June 2012	(Portugal) Henrique	(Portugal) Feirense	(Portugal) Académica de Coimbra	Free
1 July 2012	(Croatia) Danijel Stojanović	(Portugal) Nacional	(Croatia) Hajduk Split	Undisclosed
1 July 2012	(Brazil) Diogo	(Brazil) Internacional	(Portugal) FC Porto	Undisclosed
1 July 2012	(Guinea-Bissau) Juary Soares	(Portugal) Sporting CP	(Portugal) União de Leiria	Free
1 July 2012	(Portugal) William Carvalho	(Portugal) Sporting CP	(Belgium) Cercle Brugge	Free
1 July 2012	(Ghana) William Owusu	(Portugal) Sporting CP	(Belgium) Westerlo	Free
1 July 2012	(Portugal) André Marques	(Portugal) Sporting CP	(Switzerland) Sion	Free
2 July 2012	(Brazil) Nilson Júnior	(Brazil) CRB	(Portugal) Moreirense	Free
2 July 2012	(Portugal) Rafael Lopes	(Portugal) Vitória de Setúbal	(Portugal) Moreirense	Free
2 July 2012	(Brazil) Adilson	(Portugal) Estoril	(Portugal) Marítimo	Free
2 July 2012	(Portugal) André Pinto	(Portugal) FC Porto	(Greece) Panathinaikos	Free
2 July 2012	(Brazil) Cleyton	(Brazil) Corinthians Alagoano	(Portugal) Académica de Coimbra	Free
3 July 2012	(Mali) Alphousseyni Keita	(Portugal) União de Leiria	(Portugal) Académica de Coimbra	Free
3 July 2012	(Brazil) Pedro Beda	(Brazil) Bahia	(Portugal) Moreirense	Free
3 July 2012	(Portugal) Nuno Assis	(Portugal) Vitória de Guimarães	(Cyprus) Omonia	Free
3 July 2012	(Portugal) Nuno Gomes	(Portugal) SC Braga	(England) Blackburn Rovers	Free
3 July 2012	(Portugal) Bruno Jorge	(Portugal) Moreirense	(Portugal) Beira-Mar	Free
3 July 2012	(Portugal) Miguelito	(Portugal) Vitória de Setúbal	(Cyprus) Apollon Limassol	Free
3 July 2012	(Brazil) Pedro Beda	(Brazil) Bahia	(Portugal) Moreirense	Free
4 July 2012	(Spain) Ernesto Cornejo	(Spain) Barcelona B	(Portugal) Benfica	Undisclosed
4 July 2012	(Portugal) Hélder Lopes	(Portugal) Tondela	(Portugal) Beira-Mar	Free
4 July 2012	(India) Sunil Chhetri	(India) Mohun Bagan	(Portugal) Sporting CP	Undisclosed
5 July 2012	(Guinea) Salim Cissé	(Italy) Arezzo	(Portugal) Académica de Coimbra	Free
5 July 2012	(Portugal) Paulo Tavares	(Portugal) Leixões	(Portugal) Vitória de Setúbal	Free
5 July 2012	(Ivory Coast) Amessan	(Portugal) Académica de Coimbra	(Portugal) Arouca	Loan
5 July 2012	(Brazil) Rafael	(Brazil) Corinthians Alagoano	(Portugal) Nacional	Loan
6 July 2012	(Nigeria) John Ogu	(Portugal) União de Leiria	(Portugal) Académica de Coimbra	Free
6 July 2012	(Brazil) Nivaldo	(Israel) Maccabi Tel Aviv	(Portugal) Rio Ave	Free
6 July 2012	(Portugal) Diogo Tavares	(Italy) Como	(Portugal) Estoril	Free
6 July 2012	(Senegal) Pape Sow	(Portugal) Académica de Coimbra	(Greece) Panathinaikos	Undisclosed
6 July 2012	(Brazil) Revson	(Brazil) São Caetano	(Portugal) Nacional	Free
6 July 2012	(Brazil) Isael	(Brazil) São Caetano	(Portugal) Nacional	Free
6 July 2012	(Brazil) Edgar	(Portugal) Vitória de Guimarães	(United Arab Emirates) Al Shabab	Undisclosed
7 July 2012	(Portugal) André André	(Portugal) Varzim	(Portugal) Vitória de Guimarães	Undisclosed
7 July 2012	(Colombia) Jackson Martínez	(Mexico) Chiapas	(Portugal) FC Porto	€8,800,000
7 July 2012	(Brazil) Danilo	(Brazil) Macaé	(Portugal) Moreirense	Free
8 July 2012	(Portugal) Edinho	(Spain) Málaga	(Portugal) Académica de Coimbra	Loan
9 July 2012	(Portugal) Gonçalo Silva	(Portugal) Vitória de Guimarães	(Portugal) SC Braga	Free
9 July 2012	(Chile) Jaime Valdés	(Portugal) Sporting CP	(Italy) Parma	€1,800,000
9 July 2012	(Portugal) Paulo Loureiro	(Portugal) Boavista	(Portugal) Paços de Ferreira	Free
10 July 2012	(Brazil) Aderlan Santos	(Portugal) Trofense	(Portugal) SC Braga	Free
10 July 2012	(Brazil) Afonso	(Brazil) Corinthians Alagoano	(Portugal) Académica de Coimbra	Free
11 July 2012	(Portugal) Miguel Pedro	(Portugal) Feirense	(Portugal) Vitória de Setúbal	Free
12 July 2012	(Venezuela) Yonathan Del Valle	(France) Auxerre	(Portugal) Rio Ave	Free
12 July 2012	(Brazil) Boka	(Brazil) Noroeste	(Portugal) Olhanense	Free
12 July 2012	(Portugal) Pizzi	(Portugal) SC Braga	(Spain) Deportivo La Coruña	Undisclosed
13 July 2012	(Croatia) Danijel Pranjić	(Germany) Bayern Munich	(Portugal) Sporting CP	Free
13 July 2012	(Portugal) Beto	(Portugal) FC Porto	(Portugal) SC Braga	Undisclosed
13 July 2012	(Brazil) Luan Scapolan	(Brazil) Audax São Paulo	(Portugal) Gil Vicente	Free
14 July 2012	(Portugal) Fonseca	(Portugal) Leixões	(Portugal) Vitória de Setúbal	Free
14 July 2012	(Brazil) Evaldo	(Portugal) Sporting CP	(Spain) Deportivo La Coruña	Loan
15 July 2012	(Slovenia) Nejc Pečnik	(Portugal) Nacional	(England) Sheffield Wednesday	Free
16 July 2012	(Brazil) Leonardo Cipriano	(Brazil) Santa Cruz	(Portugal) Gil Vicente	Free
16 July 2012	(Brazil) Saulo	(Portugal) Académica de Coimbra	(Cyprus) AEP Paphos	Free
16 July 2012	(Brazil) Dieguinho	(Brazil) Paraná	(Portugal) Estoril	Free
16 July 2012	(Brazil) Bernardo	(Brazil) Coritiba	(Portugal) Estoril	Free
16 July 2012	(Portugal) Manuel Curto	(Portugal) União de Leiria	(Portugal) Moreirense	Free
17 July 2012	(Portugal) Yohan Tavares	(Portugal) Beira-Mar	(Belgium) Standard Liège	Undisclosed
17 July 2012	(Cape Verde) Dady	(Portugal) Olhanense	(Cyprus) Apollon Limassol	Free
18 July 2012	(Portugal) Tiago Targino	(Portugal) Vitória de Guimarães	(Bulgaria) CSKA Sofia	Free
18 July 2012	(Netherlands) Khalid Boulahrouz	(Germany) Stuttgart	(Portugal) Sporting CP	Free
18 July 2012	(Saudi Arabia) Abdullah Alhafith	(Portugal) União de Leiria	(Portugal) Paços de Ferreira	Free
18 July 2012	(France) Vincent Sasso	(France) Nantes	(Portugal) Beira-Mar	Free
19 July 2012	(Argentina) Marcos Rojo	(Russia) Spartak Moscow	(Portugal) Sporting CP	€4,000,000
21 July 2012	(Ghana) Ishmael Yartey	(Portugal) Benfica	(France) Sochaux	€2,000,000
21 July 2012	(Portugal) Jorge Gonçalves	(Portugal) Vitória de Setúbal	(Portugal) Feirense	Free
21 July 2012	(Argentina) Franco Jara	(Portugal) Benfica	(Argentina) San Lorenzo	Loan
23 July 2012	(Portugal) Fábio Felício	(Portugal) Marítimo	(Portugal) Portimonense	Free
26 July 2012	(Portugal) Rúben Micael	(Spain) Atlético Madrid	(Portugal) SC Braga	Loan
27 July 2012	(Argentina) Valentín Viola	(Argentina) Racing Club	(Portugal) Sporting CP	€4,000,000
27 July 2012	(Spain) Joan Capdevila	(Portugal) Benfica	(Spain) Espanyol	Free
27 July 2012	(Brazil) Marcos	(Portugal) SC Braga	(Portugal) Feirense	Free
27 July 2012	(Uruguay) Luis Aguiar	(Portugal) Sporting CP	(Argentina) San Lorenzo	Undisclosed
28 July 2012	(Chile) Matías Fernández	(Portugal) Sporting CP	(Italy) Fiorentina	€3,100,000
30 July 2012	(Brazil) Renato Neto	(Portugal) Sporting CP	(Hungary) Videoton	Loan
30 July 2012	(Portugal) Marco Ramos	(Portugal) SC Braga	(France) Auxerre	Free
30 July 2012	(Benin) Emmanuel Imorou	(Portugal) SC Braga	(France) Clermont	Free
30 July 2012	(Brazil) Vinícius	(Portugal) SC Braga	(Portugal) Moreirense	Loan
31 July 2012	(Portugal) Nélson Oliveira	(Portugal) Benfica	(Spain) Deportivo La Coruña	Loan
31 July 2012	(Portugal) Roderick Miranda	(Portugal) Benfica	(Spain) Deportivo La Coruña	Loan
31 July 2012	(Portugal) David Simão	(Portugal) Benfica	(Portugal) Marítimo	Loan
1 August 2012	(Guadeloupe) Cédric Collet	(France) Stade de Reims	(Portugal) Beira-Mar	Free
2 August 2012	(Portugal) Luís Neto	(Portugal) Nacional	(Italy) Siena	Undisclosed
3 August 2012	(Italy) Tommaso Berni	(Portugal) SC Braga	(Italy) Sampdoria	Free
3 August 2012	(Brazil) Rodrigo Galo	(Portugal) SC Braga	(Portugal) Académica de Coimbra	Free
6 August 2012	(Cameroon) Serge N'Gal	(Algeria) USM Alger	(Portugal) Académica de Coimbra	Free
6 August 2012	(Brazil) Felipe Desco	(Brazil) Corinthians	(Portugal) Beira-Mar	Free
9 August 2012	(Portugal) Nuno Reis	(Portugal) Sporting CP	(Portugal) Olhanense	Loan
10 August 2012	(Ivory Coast) Ouattara	(Portugal) Académica de Coimbra	(Portugal) União da Madeira	Loan
12 August 2012	(Portugal) Márcio Rosário	(Brazil) Náutico	(Portugal) Marítimo	Free
13 August 2012	(Ghana) William Tiero	(Saudi Arabia) Al-Qadisiyah	(Portugal) Gil Vicente	Free
13 August 2012	(Argentina) Leandro Grimi	(Portugal) Sporting CP	(Argentina) Godoy Cruz	Loan
14 August 2012	(Brazil) Luciano Amaral	(Brazil) Treze	(Portugal) Gil Vicente	Free
16 August 2012	(Angola) Djalma	(Portugal) FC Porto	(Turkey) Kasımpaşa	Loan
17 August 2012	(Germany) Patrick Bauer	(Germany) VfB Stuttgart	(Portugal) Marítimo	Loan
18 August 2012	(Ecuador) Vinicio Angulo	(Ecuador) Independiente José Terán	(Portugal) Paços de Ferreira	Free
20 August 2012	(Uruguay) Rodrigo Mora	(Portugal) Benfica	(Argentina) River Plate	Loan
21 August 2012	(Poland) Paweł Kieszek	(Portugal) FC Porto	(Portugal) Vitória de Setúbal	Free
22 August 2012	(Brazil) André Luiz	(Brazil) Brasiliense	(Portugal) Moreirense	Free
22 August 2012	(Brazil) Djalma	(Brazil) Santo André	(Portugal) Gil Vicente	Loan
22 August 2012	(Portugal) Henrique Sereno	(Portugal) FC Porto	(Spain) Real Valladolid	Loan
23 August 2012	(Uruguay) Álvaro Pereira	(Portugal) FC Porto	(Italy) Inter Milan	€10,000,000
24 August 2012	(Portugal) Hugo Vieira	(Portugal) Benfica	(Spain) Sporting de Gijón	Loan
24 August 2012	(Argentina) Fernando Belluschi	(Portugal) FC Porto	(Turkey) Bursaspor	€2,500,000
24 August 2012	(Portugal) Nuno Coelho	(Portugal) Benfica	(Greece) Aris	Loan
26 August 2012	(Portugal) Júlio Alves	(Turkey) Beşiktaş	(Portugal) Sporting CP	Loan
28 August 2012	(Portugal) Wilson Eduardo	(Portugal) Sporting CP	(Portugal) Académica de Coimbra	Loan
28 August 2012	(Austria) Marc Janko	(Portugal) FC Porto	(Turkey) Trabzonspor	€2,400,000
28 August 2012	(Brazil) Eliandro	(Brazil) Cruzeiro	(Portugal) Nacional	Free
28 August 2012	(Portugal) Amido Baldé	(Portugal) Sporting CP	(Portugal) Vitória de Guimarães	Free
29 August 2012	(Brazil) Gladstone	(Brazil) Duque de Caxias	(Portugal) Nacional	Free
29 August 2012	(Portugal) João Gonçalves	(Portugal) Sporting CP	(Portugal) Vitória de Guimarães	Loan
29 August 2012	(Argentina) Javier Saviola	(Portugal) Benfica	(Spain) Málaga	Free
30 August 2012	(Portugal) Ukra	(Portugal) FC Porto	(Portugal) Rio Ave	Loan
30 August 2012	(Portugal) Manuel da Costa	(Russia) Lokomotiv Moscow	(Portugal) Nacional	Loan
30 August 2012	(Brazil) João Vitor	(Brazil) Flamengo	(Portugal) SC Braga	Free
30 August 2012	(Portugal) Evandro Brandão	(Hungary) Videoton	(Portugal) Olhanense	Free
30 August 2012	(Brazil) Celsinho	(Portugal) Sporting CP	(Romania) Târgu Mureș	Free
31 August 2012	(Portugal) Yannick Djaló	(Portugal) Benfica	(France) Toulouse	Loan
31 August 2012	(Brazil) Emerson	(Portugal) Benfica	(Turkey) Trabzonspor	€1,700,000
31 August 2012	(Bulgaria) Valeri Bojinov	(Portugal) Sporting CP	(Italy) Hellas Verona	Loan
31 August 2012	(France) Atila Turan	(Portugal) Sporting CP	(Turkey) Orduspor	Loan
31 August 2012	(Portugal) Carlitos	(Germany) Hannover	(Portugal) Estoril	Free
31 August 2012	(Cape Verde) Djaniny	(Portugal) Benfica	(Portugal) Olhanense	Loan
31 August 2012	(Algeria) Rafik Halliche	(England) Fulham	(Portugal) Académica de Coimbra	Free
31 August 2012	(Portugal) Tiago Pinto	(Portugal) Rio Ave	(Spain) Deportivo La Coruña	Free
31 August 2012	(Ghana) David Addy	(Portugal) FC Porto	(Portugal) Vitória de Guimarães	Free
31 August 2012	(Brazil) Rafael Bracalli	(Portugal) FC Porto	(Portugal) Olhanense	Loan
31 August 2012	(Argentina) José Luis Fernández	(Portugal) Benfica	(Portugal) Olhanense	Loan
31 August 2012	(Brazil) Renatinho	(Brazil) Palmeiras	(Portugal) Moreirense	Loan
31 August 2012	(Portugal) Saná	(Spain) Real Valladolid	(Portugal) Académica de Coimbra	Free
31 August 2012	(Brazil) Michel	(Portugal) Benfica	(Portugal) SC Braga	Free
31 August 2012	(Portugal) Diogo Tavares	(Portugal) Estoril	(Portugal) Santa Clara	Loan
31 August 2012	(United States) Oguchi Onyewu	(Portugal) Sporting CP	(Spain) Málaga	Loan
31 August 2012	(Spain) Javi García	(Portugal) Benfica	(England) Manchester City	€20,000,000
31 August 2012	(Romania) Cristian Săpunaru	(Portugal) FC Porto	(Spain) Real Zaragoza	Free
31 August 2012	(Brazil) Lima	(Portugal) SC Braga	(Portugal) Benfica	€4,500,000
31 August 2012	(Portugal) Henrique	(Portugal) Académica de Coimbra	(England) Blackburn Rovers	Undisclosed
31 August 2012	(Portugal) Diogo Rosado	(Portugal) Sporting CP	(England) Blackburn Rovers	Undisclosed
31 August 2012	(Colombia) Héctor Quiñones	(Colombia) Atlético Junior	(Portugal) FC Porto	Undisclosed
31 August 2012	(Ghana) Thomas Agyiri	(England) Manchester City	(Portugal) Gil Vicente	Loan

- ^1 A player who signed with a club before the 1st of July 2012 will officially join his new club on 1 July 2012. While a player who joined after the 1st of July will join his new club following his signature of the contract.
