= 2011–12 FC Porto season =

Porto
2011–12 season
- Chairman: Jorge Nuno Pinto da Costa
- Manager: Vítor Pereira
- Primeira Liga: 1st
- Taça de Portugal: Fourth round
- Taça da Liga: Semi-finals
- Supertaça Cândido de Oliveira: Winners
- UEFA Champions League: Group stage
- UEFA Europa League: Round of 32
- UEFA Super Cup: Runners-up
- Top goalscorer: League: Hulk (16); All: Hulk (21)
Home colours	Away colours

The 2011–12 season is the Futebol Clube do Porto's 78th season in the Primeira Liga, officially known as the Liga ZON Sagres for sponsorship reasons. Porto captured their 25th league title last season with their 3 April defeat of rivals Benfica. Manager André Villas-Boas became their manager on 2 July 2010 and won the league with no losses in their domestic campaign. On 20 June 2011, Villas-Boas quit Porto to join Chelsea. The next day, Porto named Vítor Pereira as their new head coach.

== Squad ==
=== Current squad ===
Note: Flags indicate national team as defined under FIFA eligibility rules; some limited exceptions apply. Players may hold more than one non-FIFA nationality.

No.	Pos.	Nation	Player
1	GK	BRA	Helton
2	DF	BRA	Danilo
3	MF	ARG	Lucho González
4	DF	BRA	Maicon
5	DF	URU	Álvaro Pereira
6	MF	COL	Fredy Guarín
7	FW	ARG	Fernando Belluschi
8	MF	POR	João Moutinho
10	MF	URU	Cristian Rodríguez
11	FW	BRA	Kléber
12	FW	BRA	Hulk
13	DF	URU	Jorge Fucile
14	DF	POR	Rolando

No.	Pos.	Nation	Player
15	DF	POR	Emídio Rafael
16	DF	POR	Henrique Sereno
17	FW	POR	Silvestre Varela
18	FW	BRA	Walter
19	FW	COL	James Rodríguez
20	MF	ANG	Djalma
21	DF	ROU	Cristian Săpunaru
22	DF	FRA	Eliaquim Mangala
23	MF	BRA	Souza
25	MF	BRA	Fernando
26	DF	BRA	Alex Sandro
29	FW	AUT	Marc Janko
30	DF	ARG	Nicolás Otamendi
31	GK	BRA	Rafael Bracalli
35	MF	BEL	Steven Defour
58	FW	FRA	Thibaut Vion

=== Squad changes in 2011–12 ===
In

- (Angola) Djalma — Marítimo — Free transfer
- (Argentina) Juan Iturbe — Cerro Porteño — €2.5 million
- (Brazil) Kelvin — Paraná Clube — €2.5 million
- (Brazil) Rafael Bracalli — Nacional — Free transfer
- (Brazil) Kléber — Maritimo — €2.3 million
- (Brazil) Alex Sandro — Santos — €9.6 million
- (Brazil) Danilo — Santos — €13 million
- (Belgium) Steven Defour — Standard Liège — €6 million
- (France) Eliaquim Mangala — Standard Liège — €7 million
- (France) Thibaut Vion — Metz — €300,000
- (Argentina) Lucho González — Marseille — Free transfer
- (Austria) Marc Janko — Twente — €3 million

Out

- (Argentina) Mariano González — Estudiantes de La Plata — End of contract
- (Senegal) Coulibaly Yero — Gil Vicente — Undisclosed fee (Porto still holds a percentage of his rights)
- (Colombia) Radamel Falcao — Atlético Madrid — €40 million
- (Portugal) Rúben Micael — Atlético Madrid — €5 million

=== Out on loan ===
Note: Flags indicate national team as defined under FIFA eligibility rules; some limited exceptions apply. Players may hold more than one non-FIFA nationality.

No.	Pos.	Nation	Player
—	GK	POR	Hugo Ventura (to Olhanense)
—	DF	SEN	Abdoulaye Ba (to Académica)
—	DF	POR	André Pinto (to Olhanense)
—	DF	POR	Ivo Pinto (to União de Leiria)
—	MF	POR	Pedro Moreira (to Gil Vicente)
—	MF	POR	Edú (to Trofense)
—	MF	POR	Sérgio Oliveira (to Mechelen)
—	DF	POR	Henrique Sereno (to 1. FC Köln)
—	MF	BRA	Soares (to Recreativo de Huelva)
—	DF	POR	Miguel Lopes (to Braga)

No.	Pos.	Nation	Player
—	FW	POR	Ukra (to Braga)
—	MF	BRA	Kelvin (to Rio Ave)
—	MF	POR	André Castro (to Sporting Gijón)
—	MF	GHA	Christian Atsu (to Rio Ave)
—	MF	POR	David Bruno (to Trofense)
—	GK	POL	Paweł Kieszek (to Roda JC)
—	DF	GHA	David Addy (to Panetolikos)
—	MF	COL	Fredy Guarín (to Internazionale)
—	MF	ARG	Fernando Belluschi (to Genoa)

== Competitions ==
=== Pre-season and friendlies ===
Date	Match Type	Opponents	H / A	Result	Scorer(s)	Attendance
6 July	Friendly	Tourizense	CTFD PortoGaia	7–0	Hulk (2), Maicon, Kelvin, James Rodríguez, Kléber, Danilo (o.g.)	–
10 July	Friendly	FC Gütersloh	Heidewaldstadion	1–10	Kléber, Djalma, Hulk (3), Rúben Micael, Walter (3), Maicon	–
16 July	Friendly	Borussia Mönchengladbach	Niederrheinstadion	0–0	–	–
17 July	Friendly	SC Verl	Stadion an der Poststraße	1–3	Kléber (2), Hulk	–
21 July	Friendly	Rio Ave	Estádio dos Arcos	1–3	Kléber (2), João Moutinho	–
24 July	Friendly	Peñarol	Estádio do Dragão	3–0	Kléber, Hulk, Walter	–
31 July	Friendly	Lyon	Stade de Genève	2–1	Rúben Micael	–

=== Supertaça Cândido de Oliveira ===
7 August 2011 Final	Porto	2–1	Vitória de Guimarães	Aveiro
21:00 GMT	Rolando 4', 41'		Toscano 33'	Stadium: Municipal de Aveiro; Attendance: 18,303; Referee: Pedro Proença

=== UEFA Super Cup ===
26 August 2011 Final	Barcelona (Spain)	2–0	(Portugal) Porto	Monaco
20:45 CEST	Messi 39'; Fàbregas 88'	Report		Stadium: Stade Louis II; Attendance: 18,048; Referee: Björn Kuipers (Netherlands)

=== Primeira Liga ===
==== League table ====
Pos	Team	Pld	W	D	L	GF	GA	GD	Pts	Qualification or relegation
1	Porto (C)	30	23	6	1	69	19	+50	75	Qualification to Champions League group stage
2	Benfica	30	21	6	3	66	27	+39	69	Qualification to Champions League group stage
3	Braga	30	19	5	6	59	29	+30	62	Qualification to Champions League play-off round
4	Sporting CP	30	18	5	7	47	26	+21	59	Qualification to Europa League play-off round
5	Marítimo	30	14	8	8	41	38	+3	50	Qualification to Europa League third qualifying round

Source: LPFP (in Portuguese)
Rules for classification: 1) Points; 2) Head-to-head points; 3) Head-to-head goal difference; 4) Head-to-head away goals scored; 5) Goal difference; 6) Matches won; 7) Goals scored; 8) Play-off.
(Note: LPFP decided that only criteria 1, 5, 6 and 7 would be applied to establish the classification during the competition.)
(C) Champions

==== Matches ====
Win Draw Loss

14 August 2011 1	Vitória de Guimarães	0–1	Porto	Guimarães
19:00 GMT		SportTV1	Hulk 45+1' (pen.)	Stadium: Estádio D. Afonso Henriques; Referee: Olegário Benquerença

19 August 2011 2	Porto	3–1	Gil Vicente	Porto
20:15 GMT	Hulk 11' (pen.), 50'; Săpunaru 16'	SportTV1	Vilela 3' (pen.)	Stadium: Estádio do Dragão; Attendance: 43,913; Referee: Rui Silva

6 September 2011 3	União de Leiria	2–5	Porto	Leiria
20:15 GMT	Almeida 51'; Diego Gaúcho 78'	SportTV1	J. Rodríguez 28', 56'; Kléber 36', 74'; Varela 90+1'	Stadium: Estádio Dr. Magalhães Pessoa; Referee: Cosme Machado

11 September 2011 4	Porto	3–0	Vitória de Setúbal	Porto
GMT	Moutinho 53'; J. Rodríguez 76'; Belluschi 88'	SportTV1		Stadium: Estádio do Dragão; Attendance: 36,000; Referee: Marco Ferreira

21 September 2011 5	Feirense	0–0	Porto	Santa Maria da Feira
18:15 GMT		TVI		Stadium: Estádio Marcolino de Castro; Attendance: 15,000

25 September 2011 6	Porto	2–2	Benfica	Porto
GMT	Kléber 37'; Otamendi 50'	Sport TV1	Cardozo 47'; Gaitán 82'	Stadium: Estádio do Dragão; Attendance: 50,000; Referee: Jorge Sousa

4 October 2011 7	Académica de Coimbra	0–3	Porto	Coimbra
GMT		Sport TV1	Walter 27'; J. Rodríguez 33'; Guarín 57'	Stadium: Estádio Cidade de Coimbra; Referee: Paulo Baptista

25 October 2011 8	Porto	5–0	Nacional	Porto
GMT	Defour 24'; Walter 40'; Săpunaru 67'; Kléber 90'; Hulk 90+2'	TVI		Stadium: Estádio do Dragão

30 October 2011 9	Porto	3–0	Paços de Ferreira	Porto
20:15 GMT	Melgarejo 45' (o.g.); Kléber 64'; Moutinho 84'	Sport TV1		Stadium: Estádio do Dragão; Attendance: 30,000; Referee: Hugo Miguel

7 November 2011 10	Olhanense	0–0	Porto	Olhão
20:30 GMT		TVI		Stadium: Estádio José Arcanjo; Attendance: 3,275

14 November 2011 11	Porto	3–2	Braga	Porto
18:15 GMT	Hulk 37', 78'; Kléber 82'	TVI	Lima 89' (pen.), 90+3'	Stadium: Estádio do Dragão; Attendance: 44,000

27 November 2011 12	Beira-Mar	1–2	Porto	Aveiro
18:30 GMT	Zhang 33'	Sport TV1	J. Rodríguez 40'; Hulk 58'	Stadium: Estádio Municipal de Aveiro; Attendance: 4,628

6 December 2011 13	Porto	2–0	Marítimo	Porto
20:30 GMT	C. Rodríguez 80'; Otamendi 83'	TVI		Stadium: Estádio do Dragão; Attendance: 32,000; Referee: Duarte Gomes

19 December 2011 14	Sporting CP	0–0	Porto	Lisbon
20:15 GMT		TVI		Stadium: Estádio José Alvalade; Attendance: 48,855; Referee: Pedro Proença

14 January 2012 15	Porto	2–0	Rio Ave	Porto
20:30 GMT	J. Rodríguez 42', 80'	TVI		Stadium: Estádio do Dragão; Attendance: 24,919

22 January 2012 16	Porto	3–1	Vitória de Guimarães	Porto
18:15 GMT	Rolando 19'; Moutinho 46'; J. Rodríguez 77' (pen.)	TVI	Abdelghni 59'	Stadium: Estádio do Dragão; Attendance: 34,914; Referee: Hugo Miguel

29 January 2012 17	Gil Vicente	3–1	Porto	Barcelos
19:15 GMT	Cláudio 15', 45+1' (pen.); Cunha 52'		Varela 77'	Stadium: Estádio Cidade de Barcelos; Attendance: 7,439; Referee: Bruno Paixão

12 February 2012 18	Porto	4–0	União de Leiria	Porto
20:15 GMT	Janko 65'; J. Rodríguez 75'; Pereira 86'; Maicon 89'			Stadium: Estádio do Dragão; Attendance: 27,829; Referee: Rui Silva

19 February 2012 19	Vitória de Setúbal	1–3	Porto	Setúbal
18:15 GMT	Meyong 75'		Janko 3'; Fernando 26'; Varela 79'	Stadium: Estádio do Bonfim; Attendance: 4,703; Referee: Paulo Baptista

26 February 2012 20	Porto	2–0	Feirense	Porto
20:15	Maicon 68'; J. Rodríguez 72'	Summary		Stadium: Estádio do Dragão; Attendance: 34,229; Referee: João Ferreira dos Santos

2 March 2012 21	Benfica	2–3	Porto	Lisbon
20:15	Cardozo 42', 48'	Summary	Hulk 7'; J. Rodríguez 64'; Maicon 87'	Stadium: Estádio da Luz; Attendance: 58,222; Referee: Pedro Proença

10 March 2012 22	Porto	1–1	Académica de Coimbra	Porto
20:15	Hulk 90+2' (pen.)	Summary	Edinho 39'	Stadium: Estádio do Dragão; Attendance: 36,019; Referee: Marco Ferreira

16 March 2012 23	Nacional	0–2	Porto	Funchal
19:00		Summary	Janko 21'; Alex Sandro 90+5'	Stadium: Estádio da Madeira; Attendance: 3,257; Referee: Carlos Miguel Taborda Xistra

25 March 2012 24	Paços de Ferreira	1–1	Porto	Paços de Ferreira
20:15	Melgarejo 79'	Summary	Ricardo 47' (o.g.)	Stadium: Estádio da Mata Real; Attendance: 3,594; Referee: Hugo Rodrigues Pacheco

31 March 2012 25	Porto	2–0	Olhanense	Porto
19:00	González 24'; J. Rodríguez 66'	Summary		Stadium: Estádio do Dragão; Attendance: 31,903; Referee: Manuel Mota

7 April 2012 26	Braga	0–1	Porto	Braga
21:30		Summary	Hulk 55'	Stadium: Estádio Municipal de Braga; Attendance: 25,971; Referee: Olegário Benquerença

22 April 2012 27	Porto	3–0	Beira-Mar	Porto
21:15	Hulk 33' (pen.), 55'; Defour (yellow card) 41'; Moutinho (yellow card) 43'; González (yellow card) 47'; Janko 51'; Săpunaru (yellow card) 52'	Summary	Camará (yellow card) 15'; Dias (yellow card) 32'; Bura (yellow card) 35'	Stadium: Estádio do Dragão; Attendance: 33,412; Referee: Bruno Esteves

29 April 2012 28	Marítimo	0–2	Porto	Funchal
20:15	Rafael (yellow card) 20' (yellow-red card) 89'; Ferreira (yellow card) 32'; Robson (yellow card) 48'; Benachour (yellow card) 67'; Olberdam (yellow card) 70'; Héldon (yellow card) 84'	Summary	Hulk 16' (pen.), 89' (pen.), (yellow card) 74'; Alex Sandro (yellow card) 55'	Stadium: Estádio dos Barreiros; Attendance: 4,400; Referee: Paulo Batista

5 May 2012 29	Porto	2–0	Sporting CP	Porto
21:30 CET (UTC+01)	Săpunaru (yellow card) 14'; Moutinho (yellow card) 41'; Fernando (yellow card) 43' (yellow-red card) 90+2'; González (yellow card) 49'; Hulk 82' (pen.), 89', (yellow card) 83'	Summary	Carrillo (yellow card) 16'; Onyewu (yellow card) 20' (yellow-red card) 67'; Polga (red card) 81'	Stadium: Estádio do Dragão; Attendance: 50,212; Referee: Pedro Proença

12 May 2012 30	Rio Ave	2–5	Porto	Vila do Conde
19:30 CET (UTC+01)	Tomás 43' (pen.); Atsu 66', (yellow card) 74'	Report	Djalma 14', (yellow card) 42'; J. Rodríguez 17'; Kléber 50', 75', 90+1'	Stadium: Estádio do Rio Ave FC; Attendance: 5,454; Referee: Jorge Ferreira

=== UEFA Champions League ===
==== Group stage ====
Group G
Team	Pld	W	D	L	GF	GA	GD	Pts
(Cyprus) APOEL	6	2	3	1	6	6	0	9
(Russia) Zenit Saint Petersburg	6	2	3	1	7	5	+2	9
(Portugal) Porto	6	2	2	2	7	7	0	8
(Ukraine) Shakhtar Donetsk	6	1	2	3	6	8	−2	5

Tiebreakers

- APOEL and Zenit St. Petersburg are ranked by their head-to-head records, as shown below.

Team	Pld	W	D	L	GF	GA	GD	Pts
(Cyprus) APOEL	2	1	1	0	2	1	+1	4
(Russia) Zenit Saint Petersburg	2	0	1	1	1	2	−1	1

13 September 2011 1	Porto (Portugal)	2–1	(Ukraine) Shakhtar Donetsk	Porto, Portugal
20:45	Hulk 28'; Pereira (yellow card) 34'; Kléber 51'	Report	Luiz Adriano 12', (yellow card) 27'; Chyhrynskyi (yellow card) 31' (yellow-red card) 80'; Srna (yellow card) 34'; Rakytskiy (red card) 40'	Stadium: Estádio do Dragão; Attendance: 36,612; Referee: Felix Brych (Germany)

28 September 2011 2	Zenit Saint Petersburg (Russia)	3–1	(Portugal) Porto	Saint Petersburg, Russia
18:00	Shirokov 20', 63'; Hubočan (yellow card) 61'; Danny 72'	Report	J. Rodríguez 10'; Fucile (yellow card) 25' (yellow-red card) 45+1'; Otamendi (yellow card) 62'; Belluschi (yellow card) 69'	Stadium: Petrovsky Stadium; Attendance: 21,450; Referee: Howard Webb (England)

19 October 2011 3	Porto (Portugal)	1–1	(Cyprus) APOEL	Porto, Portugal
20:45	Hulk 13', (yellow card) 90+4'; Otamendi (yellow card) 29'; Kléber (yellow card) 45+2'; Rolando (yellow card) 49'; J. Rodríguez (yellow card) 54'; Săpunaru (yellow card) 73'; Pereira (yellow card) 78'; Guarín (yellow card) 84'	Report	Aílton 19'; Pinto (yellow card) 27'; Tričkovski (yellow card) 47'; Kaká (yellow card) 84'	Stadium: Estádio do Dragão; Attendance: 32,512; Referee: Antony Gautier (France)

1 November 2011 4	APOEL (Cyprus)	2–1	(Portugal) Porto	Nicosia, Cyprus
20:45	Aílton 42' (pen.); Poursaitidis (yellow card) 62'; Manduca (yellow card) 76', (goal) 90'; Charalambidis (yellow card) 90+2'	Report	Varela (yellow card) 3'; Mangala (yellow card) 42'; Hulk 89' (pen.)	Stadium: GSP Stadium; Attendance: 22,301; Referee: Gianluca Rocchi (Italy)

23 November 2011 5	Shakhtar Donetsk (Ukraine)	0–2	(Portugal) Porto	Donetsk, Ukraine
20:45	Eduardo (yellow card) 50'; Jádson (yellow card) 65'; Kobin (yellow card) 75'	Report	J. Rodríguez (yellow card) 35'; Hulk 79'; Raț 90+2' (o.g.)	Stadium: Donbas Arena; Attendance: 42,565; Referee: Craig Thomson (Scotland)

6 December 2011 6	Porto (Portugal)	0–0	(Russia) Zenit Saint Petersburg	Porto, Portugal
20:45	Helton (yellow card) 38'; Otamendi (yellow card) 48'; Hulk (yellow card) 71'	Report	Anyukov (yellow card) 28'; Fayzulin (yellow card) 40'; Malafeev (yellow card) 76'	Stadium: Estádio do Dragão; Attendance: 46,512; Referee: Carlos Velasco Carballo (Spain)
