= André Pires =

André Pires may refer to:

- André Pires (footballer)
- André Pires (motorcyclist)
