= Péricles Pereira =

Cape Verdean footballer (born 1993)

Pecks
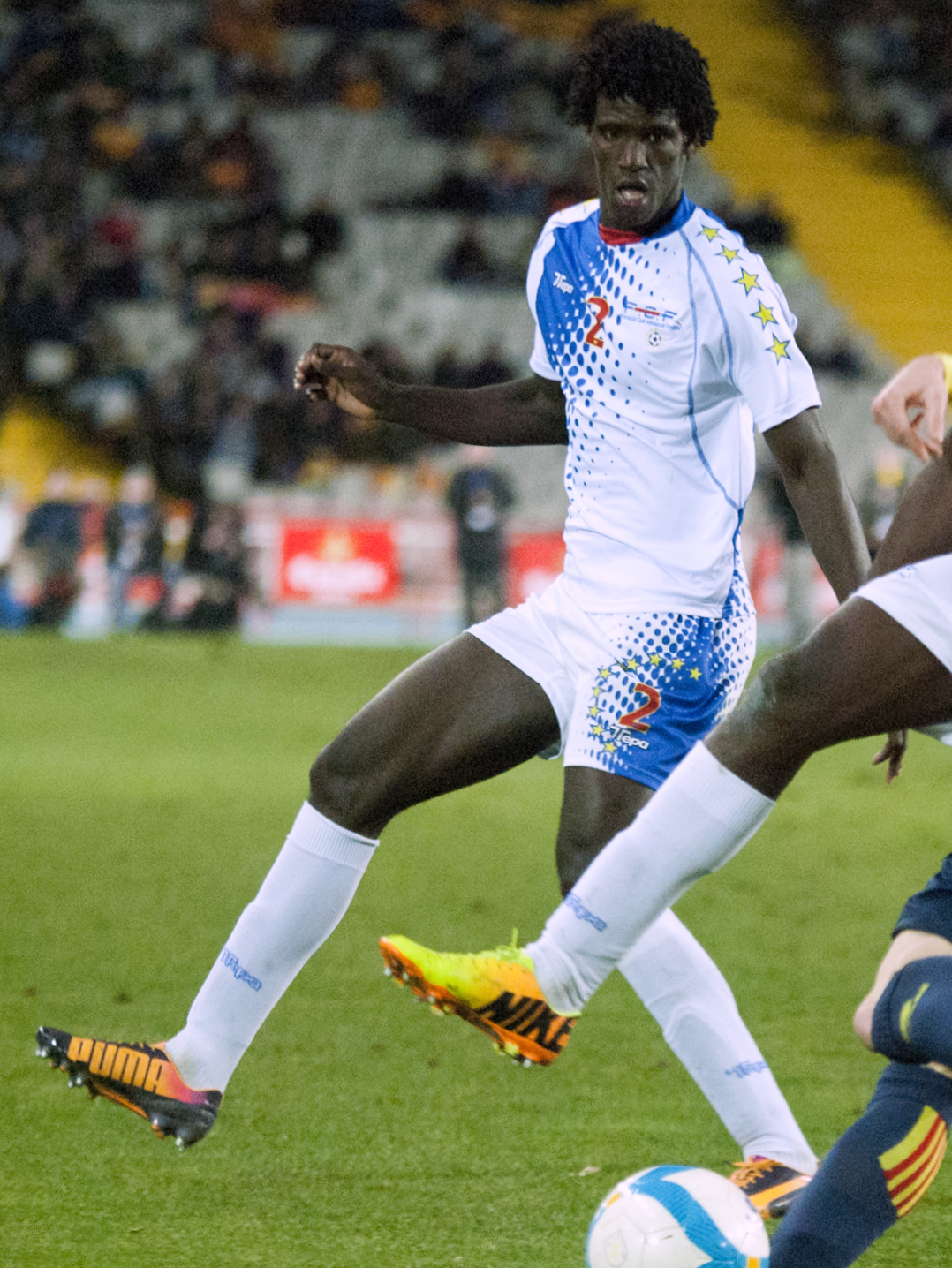
- Pecks in action for Cape Verde in 2013

Personal information
- Full name: Péricles Santos Pereira
- Date of birth: 10 April 1993 (age 33)
- Place of birth: Mindelo, Cape Verde
- Height: 1.94 m (6 ft 4 in)
- Position: Centre-back

Team information
- Current team: Salgueiros

Youth career
- Batuque
- 2011–2012: Gil Vicente

Senior career*
Years	Team	Apps	(Gls)
2012–2016	Gil Vicente	61	(2)
2018	Celtic Praia		
2019	Pedras Rubras	18	(0)
2019–2020	Leça	25	(1)
2020–2021	Valadares Gaia	3	(0)
2021–	Salgueiros	120	(15)

International career
2012–2016	Cape Verde	4	(0)
- * Club domestic league appearances and goals as of 22:36, 22 July 2026 (UTC)

Péricles Santos Pereira (born 10 April 1993), commonly known as Pecks, is a Cape Verdean professional footballer who plays as a central defender for Portuguese club Salgueiros.

He began his professional career at Gil Vicente in the Primeira Liga, making 82 appearances in all. After missing two years due to bureaucratic issues in his country, he returned to Portugal in 2019 to play in the lower divisions for several clubs.

Capped four times by Cape Verde, Pecks was part of their squad for the 2013 Africa Cup of Nations.

== Club career ==
Born in Mindelo on the island of São Vicente, Pecks began his career with local Batuque FC, before joining Gil Vicente F.C. in Portugal in 2011. After a year in the youth team, he made his Primeira Liga debut on 19 August 2012 as the season opened with a goalless draw at home against FC Porto; he came on as an 87th-minute substitute for Luís Carlos Lima. In his next game on 18 November, he played the full 120 minutes and scored to open a 2–1 away win at SC Mirandela in the fourth round of the Taça de Portugal.

Pecks scored a first top-flight goal on 6 October 2013, having come off the bench in a 2–1 victory over F.C. Paços de Ferreira at the Estádio Cidade de Barcelos. Just over two months later, he was sent off for a foul on William Carvalho in a 2–0 loss to Sporting CP at the same venue. On 13 January 2016, he scored the only goal against visitors C.D. Nacional to put his team into the semi-finals of the national cup for only the second time after 1971–72.

In June 2016, after an international game away to São Tomé and Príncipe, Pecks was caught up in bureaucratic issues in his homeland, leaving him stranded and sitting out his final season as a Gilista. He kept up practice in futsal and beach soccer with friends before resuming his career with G.D.R. Celtic in the capital, Praia.

Free to return to Portugal, Pecks signed for F.C. Pedras Rubras of the third division in 2019. He remained playing at that level for Leça F.C. and Valadares Gaia FC, dropping down to the fourth with S.C. Salgueiros in summer 2021.

== International career ==
Having made his international debut on 14 November 2012 as a substitute in a 1–0 friendly loss to Ghana in Lisbon, Pecks was chosen for the 2013 Africa Cup of Nations in South Africa, Cape Verde's debut in the competition. He was unused in a run to the quarter-finals.

Pecks made three more appearances, each in a different year, ending with the aforementioned trip to São Tomé and Príncipe.
