= Marinho (footballer, born 1943) =

Portuguese footballer

Personal information
- Full name: Mário da Silva Mateus
- Date of birth: 3 September 1943 (age 83)
- Place of birth: Lisbon, Portugal
- Position: Forward

Youth career
- 1958–1962: Atlético

Senior career*
Years	Team	Apps	(Gls)
1962–1967	Atlético		
1967–1977	Sporting CP	237	(70)
1977	Toronto First Portuguese		
1977–1978	Marítimo	12	(2)
1978–1980	Estoril	47	(11)
1979	→ Toronto Blizzard (loan)	3	(0)
1979	Toronto First Portuguese		

International career
1969–1975	Portugal	5	(1)

Managerial career
- 1980–1982: Sporting CP (assistant)
- 1982–1983: Sporting CP (youth)
- 1983–1984: Sporting CP (assistant)
- 1984: Sporting CP
- 1985–1986: Portugal (assistant)
- 1987: Sporting CP
- 1990–1991: Atlético
- 1993: Atlético
- 1996–1997: Odivelas
- 1999: Atlético
- * Club domestic league appearances and goals

Mário da Silva Mateus (born 3 September 1943), commonly known as Marinho, is a Portuguese retired footballer who played as a forward.

== Club career ==
Born in Lisbon, Marinho started his career with local Atlético Clube de Portugal, making his Primeira Liga debut in the 1962–63 season and suffering relegation as second from bottom. Three of the following four years with the club were spent in the second division.

From 1966 until his retirement, 14 years later, Marinho only competed in the top level, with Atlético, Sporting CP, C.S. Marítimo and G.D. Estoril Praia. In the 1969–70 campaign, whilst with the second side, he scored a career-best 14 goals in 26 games to win the first of his two national championships; in 1979, he had a brief spell with the Toronto Blizzard of the North American Soccer League. For the remainder of the 1979 season he played in the National Soccer League with Toronto First Portuguese, and he previously played with First Portuguese for two months in 1977.

Marinho later took up coaching, being mainly associated with Sporting in various capacities. He acted as caretaker manager to the first team on two separate seasons, winning one match and drawing three in his four games in charge.

== International career ==
Marinho earned five caps for Portugal, during six years. His first came on 2 November 1969, in a 1–1 away draw against Switzerland for the 1970 FIFA World Cup qualifiers.

Marinho: International goals
No.	Date	Venue	Opponent	Score	Result	Competition
1	26 April 1975	Stade Olympique Yves-du-Manoir, Paris, France	France	0–2	0–2	Friendly

== Personal life ==
Marinho's grandson, Mário Mateus, was also a footballer.
