= Valdinho =

Angolan footballer

Personal information
- Full name: Valdimir Ferraz Matias Nunes
- Date of birth: 6 October 1989 (age 37)
- Place of birth: Lobito, Angola
- Height: 1.76 m (5 ft 9 1/2 in)
- Position: Winger

Team information
- Current team: Vila Meã

Youth career
- 2005–2008: Freamunde

Senior career*
Years	Team	Apps	(Gls)
2008–2011	Freamunde	4	(0)
2010	→ Torre de Moncorvo (loan)	17	(5)
2011	Sertanense	14	(2)
2011–2012	Santa Clara	16	(0)
2012–2013	Aves	6	(0)
2013–2014	Gil Vicente	9	(0)
2013	→ Oliveirense (loan)	14	(0)
2014	Feirense	15	(1)
2014–2015	Vilafranquense	7	(1)
2015–?	Libolo	5	(0)
2018–2019	Lixa	22	(3)
2019–2020	Freamunde	23	(5)
2020–	Vila Meã	8	(2)
- * Club domestic league appearances and goals as of 1 August 2021

Valdimir Ferraz Matias Nunes (born 6 October 1989), commonly known as Valdinho, is an Angolan professional footballer who plays as a winger for Vila Meã.

In January 2013, Valdinho signed for Primeira Liga side Gil Vicente.
