= Edú (footballer, born 1992) =

Portuguese footballer

Personal information
- Full name: Eduardo Marques de Castro Silva
- Date of birth: 28 January 1992 (age 34)
- Place of birth: Lourosa, Portugal
- Height: 1.77 m (5 ft 10 in)
- Position: Attacking midfielder

Youth career
- 2000–2003: União Lamas
- 2003–2005: Boavista
- 2005–2006: Pasteleira
- 2006–2007: Boavista
- 2007–2008: Padroense
- 2008–2011: Porto

Senior career*
Years	Team	Apps	(Gls)
2011–2013	Porto B	37	(5)
2011–2012	→ Trofense (loan)	26	(7)
2013–2014	AEL Limassol	2	(1)
2014–2015	Beira-Mar	31	(3)
2015–2017	Penafiel	10	(0)
2017–2019	Lusitânia	50	(5)
2019–2020	São João de Ver	23	(8)

International career
2012	Portugal U20	5	(0)
2012	Portugal U21	1	(0)
- * Club domestic league appearances and goals as of 21:32, 22 April 2020 (UTC)

Eduardo Marques de Castro Silva (born 28 January 1992 in Lourosa (Santa Maria da Feira)), commonly known as Edú, is a Portuguese professional footballer who plays as an attacking midfielder.
