= Rafael Bracali =

Brazilian footballer (born 1981)

Personal information
- Full name: Rafael Wihby Bracali
- Date of birth: 5 May 1981 (age 45)
- Place of birth: Santos, Brazil
- Height: 1.84 m (6 ft 0 in)
- Position: Goalkeeper

Youth career
- Paulista

Senior career*
Years	Team	Apps	(Gls)
2001–2006	Paulista	38	(0)
2005	→ Juventude (loan)	8	(0)
2006–2011	Nacional	104	(0)
2011–2013	Porto	1	(0)
2012–2013	→ Olhanense (loan)	25	(0)
2013–2015	Panetolikos	57	(0)
2015–2018	Arouca	89	(0)
2018–2023	Boavista	80	(0)
Total		402	(0)
- * Club domestic league appearances and goals

Rafael Wihby Bracali (born 5 May 1981) is a Brazilian former professional footballer who played as a goalkeeper. He also held Italian citizenship.

== Club career ==
Born in Santos, São Paulo, Bracali started playing professionally for local Paulista Futebol Clube. In 2006, he moved to Portugal and signed with C.D. Nacional in Madeira. After backing up Diego Benaglio in his first season and appearing in 14 Primeira Liga games in the second, he became first choice after the Swiss transferred to VfL Wolfsburg.

Bracali did not miss one single league match from 2008 to 2011. He was set to sign for fellow top-division side S.C. Braga in June 2011, but the deal eventually fell through.

In August 2011, Bracali replaced the departed Beto as understudy at FC Porto, behind his compatriot Helton. He made his only league appearance for the Dragons on 12 May 2012 in the last game of a victorious campaign, a 5–2 win at Rio Ave F.C. in which he was substituted late on for fellow debutant Kadú. He was then loaned to S.C. Olhanense where he played more frequently, and the team avoided relegation by one point.

On 13 July 2015, after two years in the Super League Greece with Panetolikos FC, Bracali agreed a two-year deal with F.C. Arouca. A year after the club's relegation, on 29 June 2018 he returned to the top flight and the city of Porto by signing for Boavista F.C. on a two-year contract.

Bracali agreed to an extension at the Estádio do Bessa until 30 June 2021 in August 2019, aged 38. He played second-fiddle to Léo Jardim in 2020–21, but was again a starter afterwards.

In May 2023, Bracali announced his retirement from professional football. In July, he replaced Fary Faye as his last club's sporting director.

== Personal life ==
Bracali's father, Armando, was also a footballer and a goalkeeper. After notably representing Clube Atlético Juventus in the 1970s, he worked mainly as a goalkeeping coach at Paulista.

== Career statistics ==
Appearances and goals by club, season and competition
Club	Season	League			State league		National cup		League cup		Continental		Total	
Club	Season	Division	Apps	Goals	Apps	Goals	Apps	Goals	Apps	Goals	Apps	Goals	Apps	Goals
Paulista	2004	Série B	0	0	2 (Note: Appearances in Campeonato Paulista)	0	—		—		—		2	0
Paulista	2005	Série B	20	0	4	0	12	0	—		—		36	0
Paulista	2006	Série B	10	0	2	0	—		—		6 (Note: Appearances in Copa Libertadores)	0	18	0
Paulista	Total		30	0	8	0	12	0	—		6	0	56	0
Juventude (loan)	2005	Série A	—		—		—		—		—		—	
Nacional	2006–07	Primeira Liga	0	0	—		3	0	—		0	0	3	0
Nacional	2007–08	Primeira Liga	14	0	—		2	0	1	0	—		17	0
Nacional	2008–09	Primeira Liga	30	0	—		5	0	5	0	—		40	0
Nacional	2009–10	Primeira Liga	30	0	—		3	0	3	0	8 (Note: Appearances in UEFA Europa League)	0	44	0
Nacional	2010–11	Primeira Liga	30	0	—		1	0	4	0	—		35	0
Nacional	Total		104	0	—		14	0	13	0	8	0	139	0
Porto	2011–12	Primeira Liga	1	0	—		2	0	4	0	0	0	7	0
Olhanense (loan)	2012–13	Primeira Liga	25	0	—		1	0	0	0	—		26	0
Panetolikos	2013–14	Super League Greece	32	0	—		0	0	—		—		32	0
Panetolikos	2014–15	Super League Greece	25	0	—		0	0	—		—		25	0
Panetolikos	Total		57	0	—		0	0	—		—		57	0
Arouca	2015–16	Primeira Liga	33	0	—		4	0	0	0	—		37	0
Arouca	2016–17	Primeira Liga	19	0	—		0	0	0	0	4	0	23	0
Arouca	2017–18	LigaPro	37	0	—		3	0	2	0	—		42	0
Arouca	Total		89	0	—		7	0	2	0	4	0	102	0
Boavista	2018–19	Primeira Liga	12	0	—		1	0	0	0	—		13	0
Boavista	2019–20	Primeira Liga	13	0	—		0	0	1	0	—		14	0
Boavista	2020–21	Primeira Liga	0	0	—		1	0	—		—		1	0
Boavista	2021–22	Primeira Liga	27	0	—		1	0	4	0	—		32	0
Boavista	2022–23	Primeira Liga	28	0	—		0	0	1	0	—		29	0
Boavista	Total		80	0	—		3	0	6	0	—		89	0
Career total			386	0	8	0	39	0	25	0	18	0	476	0

== Honours ==
Paulista

- Copa do Brasil: 2005

Porto

- Primeira Liga: 2011–12
- Supertaça Cândido de Oliveira: 2011
