= Gabriel Rodríguez (Argentine footballer) =

Argentine footballer

Personal information
- Full name: Gabriel Nicolás Rodríguez
- Date of birth: 5 February 1989 (age 37)
- Place of birth: Buenos Aires, Argentina
- Height: 1.83 m (6 ft 0 in)
- Position: Forward

Youth career
- Boca Juniors

Senior career*
Years	Team	Apps	(Gls)
2008–2011	Boca Juniors	0	(0)
2010	→ Ñublense (loan)	32	(14)
2010–2011	→ Olympiacos Volou (loan)	3	(0)
2011	→ Aldosivi (loan)	3	(0)
2012	Audax Italiano	32	(10)
2012	Audax Italiano B	1	(0)
2013	Gil Vicente	3	(0)
2013–2014	Leones Negros	17	(2)
2014–2015	Ñublense	26	(3)
2015–2016	Almirante Brown	26	(9)
2016–2018	Estudiantes BA	33	(8)
2018–2019	Colegiales	11	(0)
2019	All Boys	4	(0)
2020	Santiago Morning	17	(5)
- * Club domestic league appearances and goals

Gabriel Nicolás Rodríguez (born 5 February 1989) is an Argentine former footballer who played as a forward.

== Career ==
A product of Boca Juniors, Rodríguez made his debut with them in a friendly match on 17 January 2009.

Besides Argentina, he played in Chile, Greece, Portugal and Mexico for Ñublense, Olympiacos Volou, Audax Italiano, Gil Vicente, Leones Negros and Santiago Morning.
