= Sandro Cunha =

Portuguese footballer (born 1982)

Personal information
- Full name: Sandro Fernando Silva Cunha
- Date of birth: 5 December 1982 (age 43)
- Place of birth: Fafe, Portugal
- Height: 1.88 m (6 ft 2 in)
- Position: Centre-back

Youth career
- 1996–1998: Fornelos
- 1999–2001: Fafe

Senior career*
| Years | Team | Apps | (Gls) |
| 2001–2004 | Fafe | 50 | (2) |
| 2004–2005 | Porto B | 30 | (1) |
| 2005–2006 | Tourizense | 22 | (2) |
| 2006–2007 | Lixa | 25 | (0) |
| 2007–2008 | Olhanense | 19 | (1) |
| 2008–2009 | Vizela | 20 | (1) |
| 2009–2013 | Gil Vicente | 76 | (6) |
| 2013–2014 | Moreirense | 9 | (1) |
| 2014–2019 | Varzim | 134 | (12) |
| 2020 | Fafe | 0 | (0) |
| Total | | 385 | (26) |
- * Club domestic league appearances and goals

Sandro Fernando Silva Cunha (born 5 December 1982) is a Portuguese former professional footballer who played as a central defender.

== Club career ==
Born in Fafe, Braga District, Cunha spent five of his first six seasons as a senior in the third division, in representation of AD Fafe, FC Porto B, G.D. Tourizense and F.C. Lixa. In 2007 he upgraded to the Segunda Liga, where he first appeared with S.C. Olhanense.

In the 2010–11 campaign, Cunha contributed 29 games and two goals as Gil Vicente F.C. returned to the Primeira Liga after an absence of five years. He made his debut in the competition on 12 August 2011, playing the full 90 minutes in the 2–2 home draw against S.L. Benfica. His first goal arrived on 19 May 2013, but in a 1–3 home loss to G.D. Estoril Praia.

In the summer of 2014, after one season in the second tier with Moreirense FC, Cunha signed for Varzim S.C. in the third. He won promotion in his debut campaign with a career-best seven goals, then spent a further four years with the club in division two.

Cunha returned to Fafe in February 2020. He retired shortly after, however, going on to work as manager in the lower leagues.
