= Pedro Pereira (footballer, born 1984) =

Portuguese footballer

Personal information
- Full name: Pedro Jorge Marques Pereira
- Date of birth: 3 January 1984 (age 42)
- Place of birth: Braga, Portugal
- Height: 1.70 m (5 ft 7 in)
- Position: Winger

Team information
- Current team: GD Prado
- Number: 70

Youth career
- 1995–2002: Braga

Senior career*
Years	Team	Apps	(Gls)
2002–2006	Braga B	107	(23)
2003	Braga	1	(0)
2006–2007	→ Vizela (loan)	29	(2)
2007–2009	Estrela Amadora	37	(2)
2009–2012	Aves	87	(13)
2012–2013	Gil Vicente	12	(0)
2013–2015	Aves	92	(19)
2015–2016	Freamunde	25	(2)
2016–2017	Fafe	35	(2)
2017–2018	Merelinense	16	(1)
2018–2020	Vilaverdense	54	(7)
2020–	GD Prado	2	(1)

International career
2000–2001	Portugal U16	8	(1)
2002	Portugal U18	4	(0)
2002–2003	Portugal U19	8	(2)
- * Club domestic league appearances and goals as of 8 November 2020

Pedro Jorge Marques Pereira (born 3 January 1984) is a Portuguese footballer who plays for Grupo Desportivo Prado as a right winger.

Over nine seasons, he amassed Segunda Liga totals of 268 matches and 38 goals, mainly with Aves (six years). He totalled 50 appearances in the Primeira Liga, with three clubs.

== Club career ==
Born in Braga, Pereira joined local S.C. Braga's youth system at the age of 11. He spent four full seasons with the reserves to kickstart his senior career and, on 17 August 2003, he made his first and only Primeira Liga appearance with the first team, coming on as a 77th-minute substitute in a 0–2 away loss against FC Porto; additionally, he spent time with farm team F.C. Vizela in the Segunda Liga.

Subsequently, Pereira was sparingly used during two top-division seasons at C.F. Estrela da Amadora, being relegated in 2009 due to financial irregularities. He scored the first of his two goals in the competition on 7 January 2008, to close a 4–1 home win over Vitória de Guimarães.

In the following eight years, safe for an unassuming spell at Gil Vicente F.C. in the top flight, Pereira competed in the second tier, with C.D. Aves, S.C. Freamunde and AD Fafe. In the 2013–14 campaign, he scored a career-best 12 goals in 43 games to help the first club to a final fourth position (15 across all competitions).
