= Tarcísio (footballer) =

Brazilian footballer

Personal information
- Full name: Tarcísio da Silva
- Date of birth: 1 March 1986 (age 40)
- Place of birth: Riachuelo, Brazil
- Height: 1.72 m (5 ft 8 in)
- Position: Midfielder

Team information
- Current team: Académico de Viseu
- Number: 10

Senior career*
Years	Team	Apps	(Gls)
2005–2007	Sergipe		
2008	São Cristóvão		
2008–2012	Freamunde	96	(4)
2012–2013	Sporting Covilhã	38	(6)
2013–2014	Moreirense	30	(0)
2014–2015	Chaves	25	(0)
2015–2017	Desportivo das Aves	75	(5)
2017–	Académico de Viseu	0	(0)
- * Club domestic league appearances and goals as of 5 October 2017

Tarcísio da Silva (born 1 March 1986), known as Tarcísio, is a Brazilian professional footballer who plays as a midfielder for Académico de Viseu.

== Career ==
Tarcísio made his professional debut in the Segunda Liga for Freamunde on 24 August 2008 in a game against União de Leiria.
