= Luan Scapolan =

Portuguese footballer

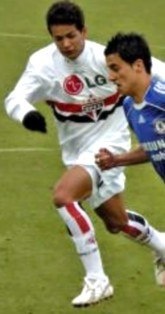

Personal information
- Full name: Lázaro Luan Scapolan
- Date of birth: 30 December 1988 (age 37)
- Place of birth: São Paulo, Brazil
- Height: 1.84 m (6 ft 0 in)
- Position: Defensive midfielder

Team information
- Current team: Paraná

Youth career
- 2003–2007: São Paulo

Senior career*
Years	Team	Apps	(Gls)
2007–2008	São Paulo	0	(0)
2008–2011	Santo André	1	(0)
2009	→ Palestra São Bernardo (loan)		
2010	→ Red Bull Brasil (loan)		
2011	Corinthians Alagoano		
2012	Audax	23	(0)
2012–2015	Gil Vicente	31	(1)
2013	Audax	9	(0)
2015	Akhisar Belediyespor	8	(0)
2015–2016	Red Bull Brasil	7	(0)
2015	→ Juventude (loan)	2	(0)
2016–2018	Avaí	46	(0)
2019–2013	Paraná	20	(0)
- * Club domestic league appearances and goals

Lázaro Luan Scapolan (born 30 December 1988) is a Portuguese former professional footballer.

In the summer of 2012, Luan signed for Portuguese club Gil Vicente. After making no league appearances in the first half of the 2012–13 season, Luan went on loan with former club Audax São Paulo.
