= Mário Mateus =

Portuguese footballer (born 1992)

Personal information
- Full name: Mário Daniel Gil Mateus
- Date of birth: 19 March 1992 (age 34)
- Place of birth: Lisbon, Portugal
- Height: 1.78 m (5 ft 10 in)
- Position: Midfielder

Team information
- Current team: Futebol Benfica

Youth career
- 2005–2011: Atlético CP

Senior career*
Years	Team	Apps	(Gls)
2011–2012	Atlético CP	5	(0)
2012–	Futebol Benfica		
- * Club domestic league appearances and goals as of 1 April 2012

Mário Daniel Gil Mateus (born 19 March 1992 in Lisbon) is a Portuguese footballer who plays for Futebol Benfica, as a midfielder.

== Personal ==
His grandfather Marinho was a professional footballer.
