= Elízio =

Brazilian footballer (born 1988)

Personal information
- Full name: Elízio Adriani Silva Albues
- Date of birth: 22 February 1988 (age 38)
- Place of birth: Cuiabá, Mato Grosso, Brazil
- Height: 1.76 m (5 ft 9 in)
- Position: Left-back

Team information
- Current team: SC Rio de Moinhos
- Number: 22

Youth career
- Vila Nova

Senior career*
Years	Team	Apps	(Gls)
2008	Vila Nova	2	(0)
2009	Grêmio Anápolis		
2009−2012	Penafiel	64	(4)
2012−2013	Gil Vicente	0	(0)
2013	Grêmio Anápolis	14	(1)
2013−2015	Moreirense	51	(1)
2015−2016	Apollon Limassol	32	(2)
2016−2017	Vizela	34	(4)
2017−2019	Nacional	22	(2)
2019−2020	Oliveirense	9	(0)
2019−2022	Varzim	39	(2)
2022−2024	Vila Meã	43	(2)
2024−	SC Rio de Moinhos	24	(4)
- * Club domestic league appearances and goals as of 23:59, 15 March 2024 (UTC)

Elízio Adriani Silva Albues (born 22 February 1988) is a Brazilian professional footballer who plays for SC Rio de Moinhos as a left-back.

== Career ==
Born in Cuiabá, Elizio is a youth product of Vila Nova Futebol Clube, only making two caps before going on loan to Grêmio Anápolis.

In 2009, Elízio made his first move abroad, joining Portuguese team, F.C. Penafiel, where he would spend three years and play for more than sixty league matches, earning interest from larger teams.

On 6 July 2012, he moved to Gil Vicente F.C., but did not make any league match, terminating his contract on 7 January 2013, and returning to Grémio Anápolis.

Half a year later, on 4 July 2013, Elizio returned to Portugal, signing a two-year deal with Moreirense. After two seasons in Portugal, with more than fifty league matches played, he was not offered a new contract, so he moved to Cyprus on 19 June 2015. After one year in Cyprus, Elizio returns to Portugal signing a contract with Vizela.
