= Luís Carlos (footballer, born June 1987) =

Brazilian footballer

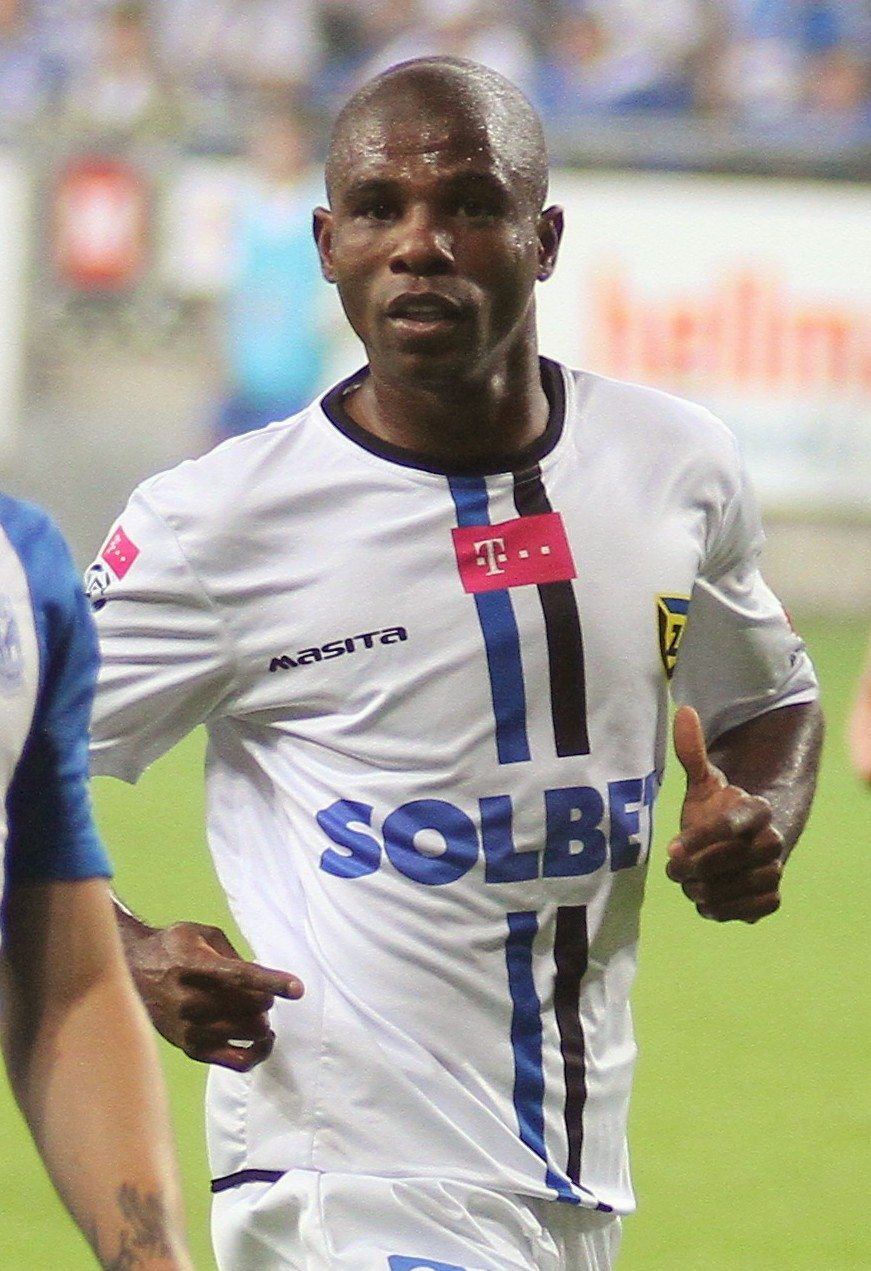
- Luís Carlos with Zawisza Bydgoszcz

Personal information
- Full name: Luís Carlos Eneas da Conceição Lima
- Date of birth: 15 June 1987 (age 39)
- Place of birth: Itaberaba, Brazil
- Height: 1.70 m (5 ft 7 in)
- Position: Winger

Youth career
- Fortaleza EC
- Santo André

Senior career*
Years	Team	Apps	(Gls)
2006–2008	Santo André		
2009	Alagoano		
2009	Gama Brasília	5	(0)
2009	Noroeste		
2010	América		
2010	Poços de Caldas		
2010–2013	Gil Vicente	79	(15)
2013–2015	Zawisza Bydgoszcz	49	(7)
2015	Korona Kielce	15	(5)
2015–2016	Moreirense FC	15	(0)
2016	Zagłębie Lubin	3	(0)
2016–2017	União da Madeira	17	(3)
2017–2021	Doxa Katokopias	104	(18)
2021	→ Karmiotissa (loan)	10	(0)
- * Club domestic league appearances and goals

Luís Carlos Eneas da Conceição Lima (born 15 June 1987), known as just Luís Carlos, is a Brazilian former professional footballer who played as a winger.

== Career ==
On 11 August 2013, Luís Carlos signed a two-year deal with Polish Ekstraklasa club Zawisza Bydgoszcz.

== Honours ==
Zawisza Bydgoszcz

- Polish Cup: 2013–14
- Polish Super Cup: 2014
