= Luciano Amaral =

Brazilian footballer (born 1982)

Personal information
- Full name: Luciano Amaral da Silva Alves
- Date of birth: 20 October 1982 (age 44)
- Place of birth: Campina Grande, Brazil
- Height: 1.80 m (5 ft 11 in)
- Position: Left back

Youth career
- Criciúma

Senior career*
Years	Team	Apps	(Gls)
2003	Criciúma		
2004	Joinville		
2005	Tubarão		
2005	Bahia		
2006	Avaí	27	(0)
2006	Caldense		
2007	CRB	4	(0)
2007–2011	Villa Rio	0	(0)
2007–2009	→ Vitória Guimarães (loan)	25	(1)
2009	→ América-RN (loan)	4	(0)
2009–2010	→ Coritiba (loan)	12	(0)
2010–2011	→ Marítimo (loan)	22	(0)
2011–2012	Apollon Limassol	6	(0)
2012	Treze	4	(0)
2012–2013	Gil Vicente	8	(0)
2013	Inter Lages	14	(2)
2014	Botafogo-PB	0	(0)
2014	ABC	20	(0)
2015	Veranópolis	11	(0)
2015	Serrano-PB	2	(0)
2016	Treze	2	(0)
- * Club domestic league appearances and goals as of 20 June 2016

Luciano Amaral da Silva Alves (born 20 October 1982), known as Amaral, is a Brazilian professional footballer who plays as a left back.

== Club career ==
Amaral was born in Campina Grande, Paraíba. After playing with a host of smaller clubs early in his career, he started appearing professionally for Avaí Futebol Clube in 2006, moving to Associação Atlética Caldense that same year.

In 2007, Amaral was signed by Vitória de Guimarães of Portugal from Villa Rio Esporte Clube, as the Minho side had just returned from the second division. He contributed sparingly in the Primeira Liga as they overachieved for a final third place, ahead of S.L. Benfica for a qualification to the UEFA Champions League.

Towards the end of his second season, Amaral was suspended by Vitória and eventually released, returning to his country with América Futebol Clube (RN), still owned by Villa Rio. After two years with Coritiba Foot Ball Club he returned to Portugal also on loan, joining C.S. Marítimo in late May 2010.
