= André Pires (footballer) =

Portuguese footballer

Personal information
- Full name: André Ferro Pires
- Date of birth: 7 February 1990 (age 36)
- Place of birth: Sobral de Monte Agraço, Portugal
- Height: 1.83 m (6 ft 0 in)
- Position: Left-back

Youth career
- 1998–1999: ADCEO
- 1999–2003: Sporting CP
- 2003–2008: Oeiras
- 2008–2009: Belenenses

Senior career*
Years	Team	Apps	(Gls)
2009–2012	Belenenses	33	(1)
2012–2014	Braga B	6	(0)
2014−2015	Olhanense	8	(0)
2015	Trofense	18	(0)
2015−2016	Santa Clara	1	(0)
2016−2017	Loures	18	(0)
2017−2019	Sacavenense	45	(4)
2019	Vilafranquense	0	(0)
2019	União Santarém	4	(0)
2019–2021	Sacavenense	14	(0)
- * Club domestic league appearances and goals as of 19:26, 26 January 2021 (UTC)

André Ferro Pires (born 7 February 1990 in Sobral de Monte Agraço) is a Portuguese footballer who plays as a left-back.
