= Olberdam =

Brazilian footballer

Personal information
- Full name: Olberdam de Oliveira Serra
- Date of birth: 6 February 1985 (age 41)
- Place of birth: João Pessoa, Brazil
- Height: 1.82 m (6 ft 0 in)
- Position: Midfielder

Youth career
- 1999–2001: Mogi Mirim

Senior career*
| Years | Team | Apps | (Gls) |
| 2002–2005 | Corinthians-AL | 40 | (2) |
| 2005–2010 | Marítimo B | 11 | (5) |
| 2005–2013 | Marítimo | 108 | (5) |
| 2010 | → Braga (loan) | 3 | (0) |
| 2010 | → Atlético Paranaense (loan) | 10 | (0) |
| 2011 | → Rapid București (loan) | 12 | (0) |
| 2013 | Legião | | |
| 2014 | Mogi Mirim | 10 | (0) |
| 2014 | Concordia Chiajna | 3 | (0) |
| Total | | 197 | (12) |
- * Club domestic league appearances and goals

Olberdam de Oliveira Serra (born 6 February 1985 in João Pessoa, Paraíba), known simply as Olberdam, is a Brazilian former professional footballer who played as a central midfielder.

== Football career ==
After starting his professional career with lowly Mogi Mirim Esporte Clube and Corinthians Alagoano, Olberdam moved abroad and joined Portuguese Primeira Liga club C.S. Marítimo in the middle of 2005, aged 20. He scored once in his first season, in a 2–0 home win over neighbours C.D. Nacional on 16 April 2006, but played only eight league matches.

In the following three years, Olberdam continued to be regularly used by the Madeira side, amassing a further 66 games and netting two goals. On 2 February 2010, he was loaned to league leaders S.C. Braga until June as the team had just lost to a hefty suspension another player in the position, compatriot Vandinho; he helped with three appearances for an eventual best-ever second-place finish.

In July 2010, Olberdam returned to his country, signing with Club Athletico Paranaense on loan. In the following transfer window, he joined FC Rapid București from Romania in the same situation.
