= William Kwabena Tiero =

Ghanaian footballer (born 1980)

William Tiero
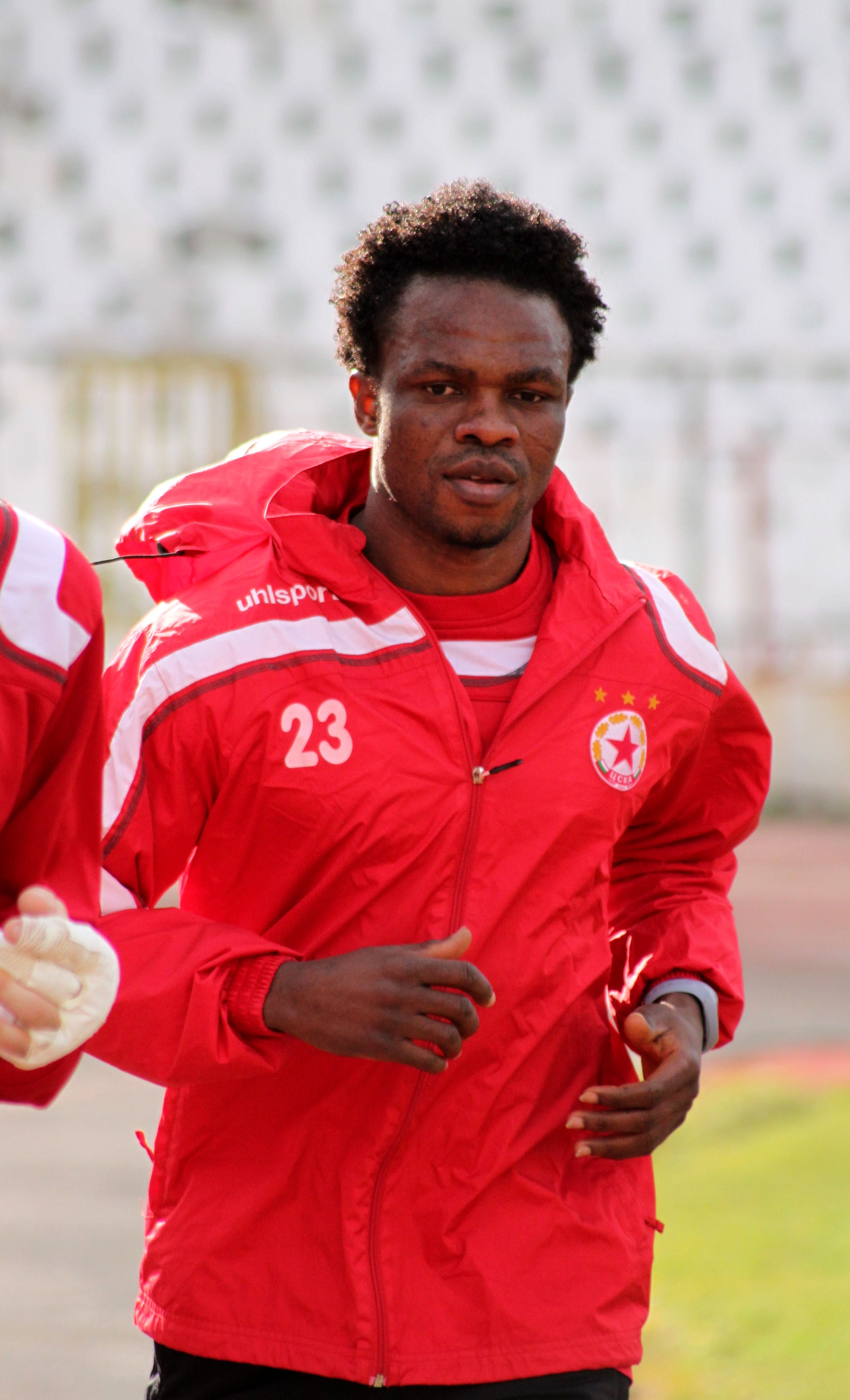
- Tiero with CSKA Sofia in 2010

Personal information
- Full name: William Kwabena Tiero
- Date of birth: 3 December 1980 (age 45)
- Place of birth: Tema, Ghana
- Height: 1.74 m (5 ft 9 in)
- Position: Midfielder

Senior career*
Years	Team	Apps	(Gls)
2002–2003	Liberty Professionals		
2004–2005	Asante Kotoko	0	(0)
2005–2006	Vitória SC	0	(0)
2006–2007	Naval	0	(0)
2007–2010	Académica Coimbra	74	(6)
2010	CSKA Sofia	4	(0)
2011	Olhanense	4	(0)
2011–2012	Al-Qadisiyah	15	(1)
2012–2013	Gil Vicente	12	(0)

International career
2003–2008	Ghana	9	(0)
- * Club domestic league appearances and goals

William Kwabena Tiero (born 3 December 1980) is a Ghanaian former professional footballer who played as a midfielder.

== International career ==
Tiero was part of the Ghanaian 2004 Olympic football team, which exited in the first round, having finished in third place in group B. Played all the three games against Italy, Paraguay and Japan, scored one goal.
