= André Cunha (Portuguese footballer) =

Portuguese footballer

Personal information
- Full name: André Albino Carvalho da Cunha
- Date of birth: 16 February 1978 (age 48)
- Place of birth: Cambeses, Portugal
- Height: 1.84 m (6 ft 1/2 in)
- Position: Midfielder

Team information
- Current team: Cruzeiro (assistant)

Youth career
- 1989–1992: Braga
- 1994–1995: Cambeses
- 1995–1996: Ninense

Senior career*
Years	Team	Apps	(Gls)
1996–1997	Ninense		
1997–1998	Académico Martim		
1998–2000	Ninense		
2000–2001	Fão		
2001–2002	Famalicão	30	(9)
2002–2003	Covilhã	30	(3)
2003–2004	Marco	26	(2)
2004–2006	Espinho	50	(15)
2006–2007	Ribeirão	20	(9)
2007–2008	Estoril	29	(3)
2008–2010	Vizela	37	(3)
2010–2013	Gil Vicente	93	(6)
2013–2014	Ribeirão	11	(0)
2014–2015	Vilaverdense	41	(2)
Total		367+	(52+)

Managerial career
- 2017–2018: Merelinense
- 2018: Vilaverdense
- 2021–2022: Braga B (assistant)
- 2024: Botafogo (assistant)
- 2025–2026: Al-Rayyan (assistant)
- 2026–: Cruzeiro (assistant)
- * Club domestic league appearances and goals

André Albino Carvalho da Cunha (born 16 February 1978) is a Portuguese former professional footballer who played as a midfielder. He is the assistant manager of Campeonato Brasileiro Série A club Cruzeiro.

== Playing career ==
Born in Cambeses, Barcelos, Cunha represented three clubs as a youth, including S.C. Braga from 1989 to 1992. During two of his formative years, he took a break from association football and played futsal, already as a senior.

Cunha competed in amateur football until the age of 23. In the 2001–02 season he joined F.C. Famalicão of the third division and, from then onwards, rarely settled with a team, alternating between the third tier and the Segunda Liga.

In mid-January 2010, Cunha signed for second-division Gil Vicente F.C. from F.C. Vizela in the league immediately below. In his first full season, he contributed 25 games (23 starts, 2,035 minutes, two goals) as they returned to the Primeira Liga after a five-year absence.

Cunha made his debut in the Portuguese top flight on 12 August 2011 – at the age of 33 years, five months and 27 days – playing the full 90 minutes in a 2–2 home draw against S.L. Benfica. On 29 January of the following year, he scored his second goal of the campaign in the 3–1 home win over FC Porto.

== Coaching career ==
After retiring, Cunha was the head coach of Merelinense F.C. and Vilaverdense FC. Subsequently, he was part of Artur Jorge's staff at several clubs, including Brazil's Botafogo FR and Cruzeiro EC.
