= Thomas Agyiri =

Ghanaian footballer (born 1994)

Personal information
- Date of birth: 28 April 1994 (age 32)
- Place of birth: Ghana
- Height: 1.76 m (5 ft 9 in)
- Position: Midfielder

Team information
- Current team: SalPa
- Number: 18

Youth career
- –2012: Right to Dream Academy

Senior career*
Years	Team	Apps	(Gls)
2012–2014	Manchester City	0	(0)
2012–2013	→ Gil Vicente (loan)	0	(0)
2013–2014	→ TPS Turku (loan)	25	(1)
2014–2015	Atlético	25	(0)
2015–2016	Farense	22	(1)
2017	Ilves	9	(1)
2018–2019	Fátima	10	(0)
2019–2022	KTP	79	(5)
2023–	SalPa	48	(1)
- * Club domestic league appearances and goals as of 24 November 2025

Thomas Agyiri (born 28 April 1994) is a Ghanaian professional footballer who plays as a midfielder for Ykkönen club SalPa.

== Career ==
Agyiri began his football career at the Right to Dream Academy in Ghana before signing for Manchester City in 2012, one of a growing number of Ghanaians who joined the English club from the academy since a partnership began between them in 2010. After signing with Manchester City, he was sent on loan to Manchester City feeder club Gil Vicente in Portugal.

Agyiri's made his professional debut after he was loaned in the following year to Veikkausliiga side TPS Turku. On 25 August 2013 he was placed in the starting line-up for his first ever senior match, a league game against RoPS, playing all 90 minutes but also receiving his first booking in a 1–1 draw.

In July 2015, Agyiri signed a one-year deal with S.C. Farense.

== Career statistics ==
As of 26 October 2024

Appearances and goals by club, season and competition
Club	Season	League			National cup		League cup		Europe		Total	
Club	Season	Division	Apps	Goals	Apps	Goals	Apps	Goals	Apps	Goals	Apps	Goals
Manchester City	2012–13	Premier League	0	0	0	0	0	0	0	0	0	0
Manchester City	2013–14	Premier League	0	0	0	0	0	0	0	0	0	0
Manchester City	Total		0	0	0	0	0	0	0	0	0	0
Gil Vicente (loan)	2012–13	Primeira Liga	0	0	0	0	0	0	–		0	0
TPS (loan)	2013	Veikkausliiga	11	1	0	0	0	0	–		11	1
TPS (loan)	2014	Veikkausliiga	14	0	1	0	–		–		15	1
TPS (loan)	Total		25	1	1	0	0	0	0	0	26	1
Atlético	2014–15	LigaPro	25	0	1	0	2	0	–		25	0
Farense	2015–16	LigaPro	22	1	1	0	1	0	–		24	1
Ilves	2017	Veikkausliiga	9	1	0	0	–		–		9	1
Fátima	2018–19	Campeonato de Portugal	10	0	0	0	–		–		10	0
KTP	2019	Ykkönen	10	0	–		–		–		10	0
KTP	2020	Ykkönen	20	2	6	2	–		–		26	4
KTP	2021	Veikkausliiga	23	2	3	0	–		–		26	2
KTP	2022	Ykkönen	26	1	2	0	–		–		28	1
KTP	Total		79	5	11	2	0	0	0	0	90	7
SalPa	2023	Ykkönen	15	1	1	0	–		–		16	1
SalPa	2024	Ykkösliiga	25	0	1	0	–		–		26	0
SalPa	Total		40	1	2	0	0	0	0	0	42	1
Career total			210	9	16	2	3	0	0	0	229	11
