= João Vilela =

Portuguese footballer

Personal information
- Full name: João Pedro Ferreira Vilela
- Date of birth: 9 September 1985 (age 41)
- Place of birth: Lisbon, Portugal
- Height: 1.78 m (5 ft 10 in)
- Position: Attacking midfielder

Youth career
- 1994–1995: Damaiense
- 1995–2004: Benfica

Senior career*
Years	Team	Apps	(Gls)
2004–2006	Benfica B	10	(1)
2006	→ Gil Vicente (loan)	7	(1)
2006–2009	Gil Vicente	72	(10)
2009–2010	Fátima	21	(3)
2010–2012	Gil Vicente	35	(6)
2012–2013	Tractor Sazi	8	(0)
2013–2015	Gil Vicente	59	(9)
2015	Belenenses	1	(0)
2016	União Leiria	14	(6)
2016–2017	Schaffhausen	16	(1)
Total		243	(37)

International career
2001	Portugal U15	6	(0)
2001–2002	Portugal U17	8	(2)
2002–2003	Portugal U18	7	(0)
2003	Portugal U19	1	(0)
2004–2006	Portugal U20	8	(2)
- * Club domestic league appearances and goals

João Pedro Ferreira Vilela (born 9 September 1985) is a Portuguese former professional footballer who played as an attacking midfielder.

== Club career ==
A youth product of hometown's S.L. Benfica, joining at the age of nine, Lisbon-born Vilela was promoted to the main squad for the 2004–05 season, but only appeared in preseason for the club, joining Gil Vicente F.C. on loan in January 2006. On 26 March, he scored in a 1–1 home draw against Vitória S.C. in his fifth Primeira Liga game.

With the Barcelos side now in the Segunda Liga, the move was made permanent in the summer, and Vilela totalled 81 official appearances in three years, netting 12 times. In 2009 he signed with another team in that level, C.D. Fátima, returning to Gil Vicente the following year and contributing three goals in 25 matches (15 starts) in his second season for a return to the top flight after five years.

On 25 June 2012, Vilela joined Iran Pro League side Tractor Sazi F.C. on a two-year contract, along with compatriot Anselmo Cardoso. In the next transfer window, however, he returned to his previous club due to unpaid wages.

In early July 2015, after suffering relegation to division two, Vilela left Gil and signed for C.F. Os Belenenses. Six months later, he dropped down to the third tier and joined U.D. Leiria.

On 19 July 2016, the 30-year-old Vilela moved abroad again as he agreed to a two-year deal at FC Schaffhausen. He scored on his debut five days later, helping to a 1–0 win over FC Wil in the Swiss Challenge League; at his own request, he was released on 26 February 2017.

== International career ==
Vilela won 30 caps for Portugal at youth level. He participated in the 2006 Toulon Tournament with the under-20 team, scoring in a 2–0 group-stage victory against the Czech Republic in an eventual third-place finish.

== Honours ==
Gil Vicente

- Liga de Honra: 2010–11
