= 2011–12 Gil Vicente F.C. season =

Gil Vicente
2011–12 season
- Chairman: António Fiúsa
- Manager: Paulo Alves
- Stadium: Estádio Cidade de Barcelos
- Primeira Liga: 9th
- Taça de Portugal: Third round
- Taça da Liga: Runners-up
- Top goalscorer: League: Cláudio (8); All: Cláudio (10)
- Highest home attendance: 11,032 vs Benfica (12 August 2011)
- Lowest home attendance: 1,028 vs Marítimo (31 October 2011)
Home colours	Away colours

The 2011–12 Gil Vicente F.C. season was the club's 79th competitive season, 15th in the Primeira Liga, and 87th year in existence as a football club.

Having achieved promotion from the Segunda Liga as winners of the 2010–11 Liga de Honra, the club were looking to retain their place in the Primeira Liga after a six-year absence from the top flight. The Gilistas finished 9th in the league table, ten points above the relegation zone. Despite suffering an early exit in the Taça de Portugal to third division Torreense, the Gilistas reached their first final of a major competition by reaching the final of the Taça da Liga where they lost 2–1 to Benfica at the Estádio Cidade de Coimbra.

== Key events ==
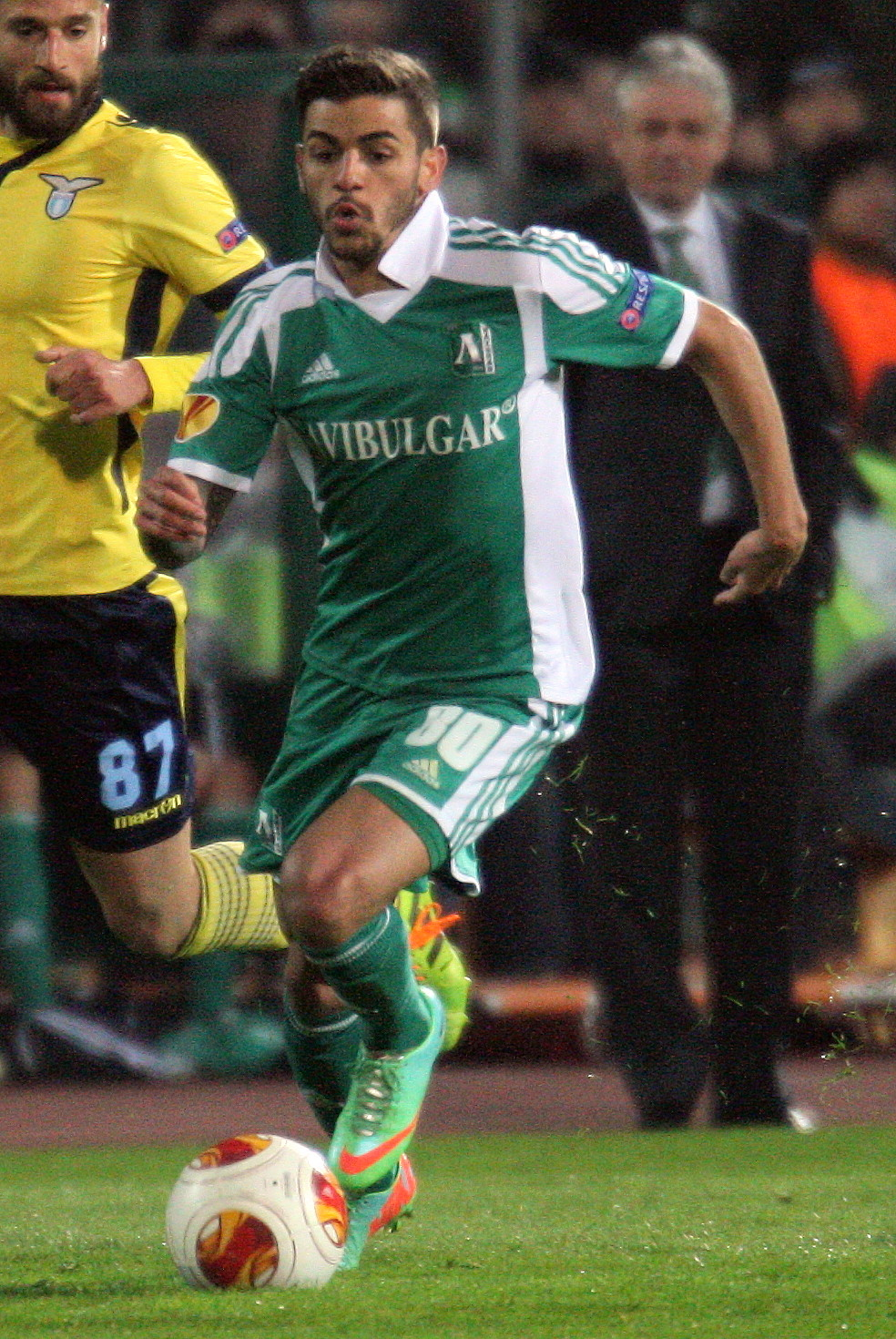
Júnior Caiçara

=== July ===
- 16: Gil Vicente finish third in the City of Freamunde pre-season tournament behind Moreirense and Desportivo das Aves.
- 20: The Gilistas win their first pre-season game by defeating Segunda Liga side Oliveirense 1–0, at the Estádio Carlos Osório. Rui Faria scored Gil Vicente's goal.
- 23: Gil Vicente wins their second consecutive pre-season game after a 1–0 victory over Segunda Liga side Sporting da Covilhã.
- 26: In Gil Vicente's official presentation to its members of their 2011–12 squad, the Gilistas lose 3–0 to Braga. Zé Luís, who prior to the start of the pre-season campaign signed for Braga from Gil Vicente, scored two of Braga's three goals.
- 30: Gil Vicente wins their third pre-season game, after a 4–0 victory over Tirsense. A brace from Kalidou Yéro, a free kick from winger Laionel and second half strike from Hugo Vieira sealed Gil's victory.

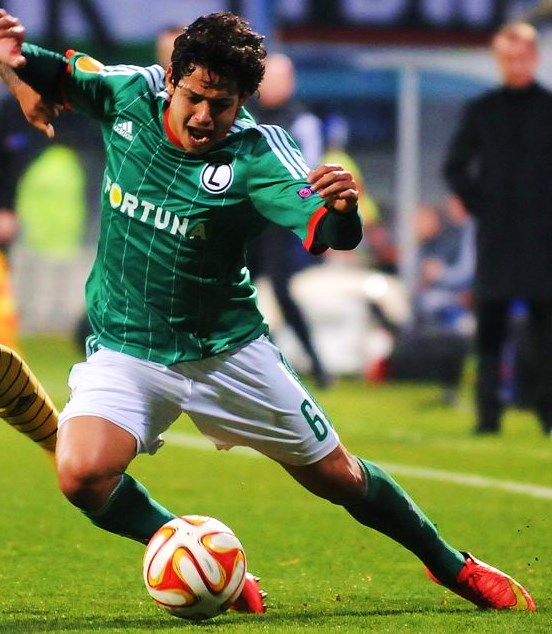
Guilherme joined the Gilistas on loan from Braga.

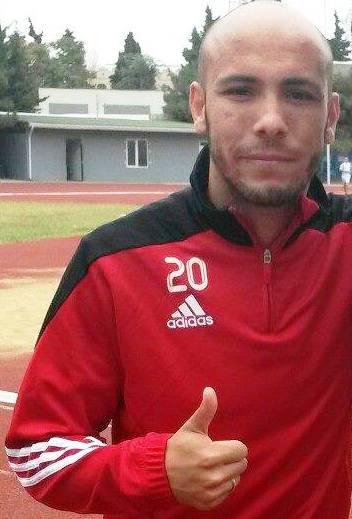
Richard Almeida

=== August ===
- 12: Gil Vicente open their 2011–12 league campaign with a 2–2 draw at home to Benfica. Benfica led the game 2–0 with goals from Nolito and Javier Saviola in the first 20 minutes of the game, but the Gilistas recovered from a two-goal deficit to draw the game with a late first-half goal from Hugo Vieira and 73rd-minute strike from Laionel.
- 19: Gil Vicente suffer their first loss of the season, away to Porto. A third minute João Vilela penalty opened the scoring for the visitors. Porto equalized eight minutes later, and would go on to score a further two goals through Cristian Săpunaru and Hulk to claim a 3–1 home win.
- 27: Gil Vicente win their first league game of the season after a 2-0 home win over Académica de Coimbra. Captain André Cunha opened the scoring in the 69th minute, and Cláudio converted from the penalty spot on 87 minutes to claim all three points for the home side.
- 29: Attacking midfielder João Vilela suffers a serious injury in training which would keep him out of action for six months.
- 30: Gil's chairman António Fiúsa announces that the club rejected a €500,000 bid from Greek side Panathinaikos for Hugo Vieira.
- 31: Gil Vicente announce the loan signing of Guilherme from Braga.

=== September ===
- 11: Braga inflict on Gil Vicente their second defeat of the league campaign. A brace from Nuno Gomes and a 72nd-minute strike from Hélder Barbosa saw the Bracarenses defeat Os Galos 3–1 at the Estádio Municipal de Braga.
- 20: Gil Vicente draws third division side Torreense in the third round of the Taça de Portugal.

=== October ===
- 15: Gil Vicente suffer a shock third round exit at the hands of third division side Torreense in the Taça da Portugal.

=== January ===
- 31: Following his release from Benfica, César Peixoto signs a short term deal with Gil Vicente until the end of the season. Gil also announce the loan signing of Cape Verdean striker Zé Luís from Braga.

=== April ===
- 14: Benfica defeat Gil Vicente 2–1 in the Taça da Liga final. In a match which took place at the Estádio Cidade de Coimbra, Benfica opened the scoring on 30 minutes through Spanish forward Rodrigo. Gil Vicente equalized on 78 minutes through Zé Luís. Benfica would regain the lead six minutes later through Javier Saviola. The Encardnados would hold on to secure a fourth league cup in five seasons.
- 28: The Gilistas 3–1 win over Vitória de Guimarães secures their stay in the Primeira Liga. A brace from João Vilela and a second-half strike from Rodrigo Galo secured the win over the Vimaranenses.

=== May ===
- 12: In their final league game of the season, Gil Vicente comfortably defeat Feirense 3–1 to finish ninth in the Primeira Liga. A first-half strike from Hugo Vieira and a brace from Zé Luís sealed Gil's victory.

== Club ==
=== Coaching staff ===
Position	Staff
Manager	(Portugal) Paulo Alves
Assistant Manager	(Portugal) Pedro Pinto
Technical Director	(Portugal) Lim Costa
Goalkeeper Coach	(Portugal) Fernando Baptista
Fitness Coach	(Portugal) Ricardo Vaz
Physio	(Portugal) Lino Silva
Scout	(Portugal) Daniel Pacheco
Head of Youth Development	(Portugal) Paulo Oliveira

=== Other information ===
Chairman	(Portugal) António Fiúsa
Sporting Director	(Brazil) Aloísio
Ground (capacity and dimensions)	Estádio Cidade de Barcelos (12,504 / 106 x 68 metres)
Training Ground	Estádio Cidade de Barcelos

== First team squad ==
Stats as of the end of the 2011–12 season. Games played and goals scored only refers to appearances and goals in domestic league campaigns.

No.	Name	Nationality	Position(s)	Since	Date of Birth (Age)	Signed from	Games	Goals
Goalkeepers
1	Adriano Facchini	(Brazil)	GK	2011	12 March 1983 (aged 29)	(Portugal) União da Madeira	30	0
21	Jorge Baptista	(Portugal)	GK	2011	2 April 1977 (aged 35)	(Portugal) Naval 1º de Maio	12	0
79	Vítor Murta	(Portugal)	GK	2010	21 July 1979 (aged 32)	(Portugal) Vizela	12	0
Defenders
2	Rodrigo Galo	(Brazil)	RB	2008	19 September 1986 (aged 25)	(Portugal) Braga	90	11
3	João Pedro	(Portugal)	LB	2010	15 August 1980 (aged 31)	(Cyprus) Ethnikos Achna	111	6
4	Sandro Cunha	(Portugal)	CB / RB	2009	5 December 1982 (aged 29)	(Portugal) Vizela	61	5
6	Daniel Faria	(Portugal)	CB / RB	2006	29 March 1987 (aged 25)	(Portugal) Youth System	67	1
16	Paulão	(Brazil)	CB	2011	16 October 1985 (aged 26)	(Brazil) Grêmio Anápolis	9	0
20	Éder Sciola	(Brazil)	RB	2011	25 September 1985 (aged 26)	(Brazil) Ituano	12	0
22	Paulo Arantes (VC)	(Portugal)	LB / RB	2005	15 November 1986 (aged 25)	(Portugal) Youth System	93	0
44	Cláudio	(Brazil)	CB	2010	17 August 1977 (aged 34)	(Portugal) Trofense	49	9
55	Halisson	(Brazil)	CB	2011	28 June 1985 (aged 26)	(Romania) Târgu Mureș	24	0
80	Júnior Caiçara	(Brazil)	LB / RB	2010	4 July 1989 (aged 22)	(Brazil) CSA	56	1
Midfielders
5	Rui Faria	(Portugal)	DM / LB	2011	30 May 1992 (aged 19)	(Portugal) Youth System	0	0
8	Pedro Moreira	(Portugal)	CM / DM	2011	15 March 1989 (aged 23)	(Portugal) Porto	39	0
10	André Cunha (C)	(Portugal)	CM / LM	2010	16 February 1978 (aged 34)	(Portugal) Vizela	65	4
11	Sidnei	(Cape Verde)	CM	2011	23 February 1986 (aged 26)	(Portugal) Marítimo	1	0
19	Mauro	(Brazil)	DM	2011	31 October 1990 (aged 21)	(Brazil) Atlético Goianiense	8	0
25	César Peixoto	(Portugal)	AM / LB / LM	2012	12 May 1980 (aged 32)	Free agent	10	0
40	Guilherme	(Brazil)	AM / LB / LM	2011	21 May 1991 (aged 20)	(Portugal) Braga	19	0
66	Luís Manuel	(Portugal)	CM / DM	2010	25 June 1981 (aged 30)	(Portugal) Lousada	74	0
77	João Vilela	(Portugal)	AM / CM	2010	9 September 1985 (aged 26)	(Portugal) Fátima	114	17
89	Richard Almeida	(Brazil)	AM / LM / LW	2010	20 March 1989 (aged 23)	(Brazil) Santo André	57	5
Forwards
7	Laionel	(Brazil)	RW	2011	27 April 1986 (aged 26)	(Brazil) Grêmio Anápolis	14	2
9	Tó Barbosa	(Portugal)	LW	2011	30 September 1992 (aged 19)	(Portugal) Youth System	8	0
12	Leandrinho	(Brazil)	CF	2011	25 March 1983 (aged 29)	(Brazil) Volta Redonda	0	0
13	Kalidou Yéro	(Senegal)	CF	2011	19 August 1991 (aged 20)	(Portugal) Porto	6	0
29	Roberto	(Brazil)	CF	2011	29 July 1978 (aged 33)	(China) Beijing Guoan	12	1
30	Bruno Filipe	(Portugal)	CF	2005	15 January 1986 (aged 26)	(Portugal) Gil Vicente	37	7
50	Luís Carlos	(Brazil)	AM / LW / RW	2010	15 June 1987 (aged 24)	(Brazil) Santo André	52	10
70	Hugo Vieira	(Portugal)	CF / LW / RW	2009	25 July 1988 (aged 23)	(Portugal) Santa Maria	62	16
99	Zé Luís	(Cape Verde)	CF	2012	24 January 1991 (aged 21)	(Portugal) Braga	39	18

== Transfers ==
=== In ===
==== Summer ====
No.	Pos	Player	Transferred From	Date	Fee
12	CF	(Brazil) Leandrinho	(Brazil) Volta Redonda	14 June 2011	Free
1	GK	(Brazil) Adriano Facchini	(Portugal) União da Madeira	28 June 2011	Free
16	CB	(Brazil) Paulão	(Brazil) Grêmio Anápolis	28 June 2011	Loan
20	RB	(Brazil) Éder Sciola	(Brazil) Ituano	1 July 2011	Free
19	DM	(Brazil) Mauro	(Brazil) Atlético Goianiense	5 July 2011	Free
80	LB	(Brazil) Júnior Caiçara	(Brazil) Santo André	5 July 2011	Loan
8	CM	(Portugal) Pedro Moreira	(Portugal) Porto	7 July 2011	Loan
13	CF	(Senegal) Kalidou Yéro	(Portugal) Porto	11 July 2011	Free
7	RW	(Brazil) Laionel	(Brazil) Grêmio Anápolis	11 July 2011	Loan
50	LW	(Brazil) Luís Carlos	(Brazil) Santo André	26 July 2011	Free
55	CB	(Brazil) Halisson	(Brazil) Noroeste	14 August 2011	Loan
89	AM	(Brazil) Richard Almeida	(Portugal) Santo André	17 August 2011	Loan
29	CF	(Brazil) Roberto	(China) Beijing Guoan	22 August 2011	Free
40	AM	(Brazil) Guilherme	(Portugal) Braga	29 August 2011	Loan
11	CM	(Cape Verde) Sidnei	(Portugal) Marítimo	31 August 2011	Free

==== Winter ====
No.	Pos	Player	Transferred From	Date	Fee
2	RB	(Brazil) Rodrigo Galo	(Portugal) Braga	29 December 2011	Loan
99	CF	(Cape Verde) Zé Luís	(Portugal) Braga	31 January 2012	Loan
25	LM	(Portugal) César Peixoto	Unattached	31 January 2012	Free

=== Out ===
==== Summer ====
No.	Pos	Player	Transferred From	Date	Fee
20	CF	(Cape Verde) Zé Luís	(Portugal) Braga	26 May 2011	Undisclosed Fee
2	RB	(Brazil) Rodrigo Galo	(Portugal) Braga	8 June 2011	Undisclosed Fee
5	CM	(Portugal) Filipe Fernandes	(Portugal) Sporting da Covilhã	1 July 2011	Free
17	GK	(Portugal) Nuno Santos	(Portugal) Sporting da Covilhã	1 July 2011	Free
87	AM	(Portugal) Duarte Duarte	(Portugal) Varzim	25 July 2011	Free
26	LW	(Cape Verde) Rodi	(Portugal) Pinhalnovense	1 August 2011	Loan
1	GK	(Portugal) Flávio Costa	(Portugal) Cerveira	2 August 2011	Loan
	LB	(Portugal) Ruca	(Portugal) Tondela	18 August 2011	Loan
	CB	(Portugal) Vitor Veloso	(Portugal) Vitorino de Piães	6 September 2011	Free
	CM	(Portugal) Tiago Lopes	(Portugal) Prado	11 September 2011	Free
	LB	(Portugal) Vítor Sousa	(Portugal) Melgacense	15 September 2011	Free
	CB	(Portugal) Rui Lopes	(Portugal) Melgacense	15 September 2011	Free
88	CB	(Portugal) Simão Coutinho	(Portugal) Vianense	26 October 2011	Free
	LM	(Portugal) Miguel Rodrigues	(Portugal) Milhazes		Free

==== Winter ====
No.	Pos	Player	Transferred From	Date	Fee
11	CM	(Cape Verde) Sidnei	(Angola) Recreativo do Libolo	24 December 2011	Loan
	CM	(Portugal) Fábio Fernandes	(Portugal) Águias da Graça	2 January 2012	Loan
12	CF	(Brazil) Leandrinho	(Brazil) CRB	5 January 2012	Free
	CM	(Venezuela) Venú	(Portugal) Santa Maria	11 January 2012	Loan
30	CF	(Portugal) Bruno Filipe	(Portugal) Gondomar	31 January 2012	Loan

== Pre-season and friendlies ==
=== Legend ===
Win Draw Loss

=== Matches ===
15 July 2011 City of Freamunde Tournament	Gil Vicente	0 – 0	Moreirense	Freamunde
18:00 WEST				Stadium: Complexo Desportivo do SC Freamunde

20 July 2011 Friendly	Oliveirense	0 – 1	Gil Vicente	Oliveira de Azeméis
17:00 WEST			R. Faria 77'	Stadium: Estádio Carlos Osório

23 July 2011 IMB Natura Hotéis Tournament	Sporting da Covilhã	0 – 1	Gil Vicente	Covilhã
17:00 WEST			R. Faria	Stadium: Estádio Municipal José Santos Pinto

26 July 2011 Crédito Agrícola Cup	Gil Vicente	0 – 3	Braga	Barcelos
WEST		(Report)	Zé Luís 19', 33'; Nuno Gomes 66'	Stadium: Estádio Cidade de Barcelos

30 July 2011 Friendly	Gil Vicente	4 – 0	Tirsense	Barcelos
10:00 WEST	Laionel 20'; Yéro 40', 60'; Vieira 76'			Stadium: Estádio Cidade de Barcelos

3 August 2011 Friendly	Varzim	0 – 0	Gil Vicente	Póvoa de Varzim
19:00 WEST				Stadium: Póvoa de Varzim Municipal Stadium

6 August 2011 Friendly	Rio Ave	0 – 0	Gil Vicente
17:00 WEST

16 August 2011 Friendly	Limianos	0 – 1	Gil Vicente
20:00 WEST

== Competitions ==
=== Legend ===
Win Draw Loss

=== Overall ===
Competition	Started round	Final position / round	First match	Last match
Primeira Liga		9th	12 August 2011	12 May 2012
Taça de Portugal	3rd round		15 October 2011	
Taça da Liga	Second round	Runners-up	27 October 2011	14 April 2012

=== Competition record ===
Competition	Record							
Competition	G	W	D	L	GF	GA	GD	Win %
Primeira Liga	30	8	10	12	31	42	−11	26.67
Taça de Portugal	1	0	0	1	0	1	−1	0.00
Taça da Liga	7	3	2	2	10	8	+2	42.86
Total	38	11	12	15	41	51	−10	28.95

=== Primeira Liga ===
==== League table ====
Pos	Team	Pld	W	D	L	GF	GA	GD	Pts
7	Nacional	30	13	5	12	48	50	−2	44
8	Olhanense	30	9	12	9	36	38	−2	39
9	Gil Vicente	30	8	10	12	31	42	−11	34
10	Paços de Ferreira	30	8	7	15	35	53	−18	31
11	Vitória de Setúbal	30	8	6	16	24	49	−25	30

Source: LPFP (in Portuguese)
Rules for classification: 1) Points; 2) Head-to-head points; 3) Head-to-head goal difference; 4) Head-to-head away goals scored; 5) Goal difference; 6) Matches won; 7) Goals scored; 8) Play-off.
(Note: LPFP decided that only criteria 1, 5, 6 and 7 would be applied to establish the classification during the competition.)

==== Matches ====
12 August 2011 1	Gil Vicente	2 – 2	Benfica	Estádio Cidade de Barcelos, Barcelos
20:45 WEST	Vieira 37'; Laionel 74'		Nolito 8'; Saviola 20'	Attendance: 12,032; Referee: João Ferreira

19 August 2011 2	Porto	3 – 1	Gil Vicente	Estádio do Dragão, Porto
WEST	Hulk 12' (pen.), 50'; Săpunaru 16'		Vilela 2' (pen.)	Attendance: 43,912; Referee: Rui Silva

27 August 2011 3	Gil Vicente	2 – 0	Académica de Coimbra	Estádio Cidade de Barcelos, Barcelos
19:30 WEST	Cunha 69'; Cláudio 87' (pen.)			Attendance: 3,291; Referee: Olegário Benquerença

11 September 2011 4	Braga	3 – 1	Gil Vicente	Estádio Municipal de Braga, Braga
17:00 WEST	Nuno Gomes 61', 90'; Barbosa 72'		Cláudio 89' (pen.)	Attendance: 13,222; Referee: Rui Costa

16 September 2011 5	Gil Vicente	1 – 1	Olhanense	Estádio Cidade de Barcelos, Barcelos
20:15 WEST	Cláudio 89'		Eduardo 44'	Attendance: 3,175; Referee: Hélder Malheiro

25 September 2011 6	Paços de Ferreira	1 – 2	Gil Vicente	Estádio da Mata Real, Paços de Ferreira
16:00 WEST	Melgarejo 5'		Laionel 44'; Cláudio 56' (pen.)	Attendance: 1,506; Referee: Hugo Pacheco

3 October 2011 7	Gil Vicente	0 – 0	Beira-Mar	Estádio Cidade de Barcelos, Barcelos
20:15 WEST				Attendance: 4,162; Referee: André Gralha

24 October 2011 8	Sporting CP	6 – 1	Gil Vicente	Estádio José Alvalade, Lisbon
20:15 WEST	Carriço 7'; Van Wolfswinkel 58' (pen.); Capel 61', 65'; Bojinov 79', 90'		Roberto 75'	Attendance: 30,103; Referee: João Capela

1 November 2011 9	Gil Vicente	0 – 0	Marítimo	Estádio Cidade de Barcelos, Barcelos
16:00 WEST				Attendance: 1,028; Referee: Rui Silva

6 November 2011 10	Vitória de Setúbal	0 – 0	Gil Vicente	Estádio do Bonfim, Setúbal
16:00 WEST				Attendance: 2,626; Referee: Olegário Benquerença

27 November 2011 11	Gil Vicente	2 – 1	União de Leiria	Estádio Cidade de Barcelos, Barcelos
16:00 WEST	Vieira 16', 69'		Leal 77'	Attendance: 6,234; Referee: Duarte Gomes

11 December 2011 12	Rio Ave	2 – 0	Gil Vicente	Estádio dos Arcos, Vila do Conde
16:00 WEST	Wíres 17'; Yazalde 53'			Attendance: 1,632; Referee: João Ferreira

17 December 2011 13	Vitória de Guimarães	1 – 1	Gil Vicente	Estádio D. Afonso Henriques, Guimarães
20:15 WEST	Assis 18'		N'Diaye 44' (o.g.)	Attendance: 8,556; Referee: André Gralha

8 January 2012 14	Gil Vicente	0 – 3	Nacional	Estádio Cidade de Barcelos, Barcelos
16:00 WET			Danielson 1'; Rondón 6'; Školnik 83'	Attendance: 4,148; Referee: Carlos Xistra

14 January 2012 15	Feirense	0 – 0	Gil Vicente	Estádio Marcolino de Castro, Santa Maria da Feira
16:00 WET				Attendance: 1,385; Referee: Vasco Santos

22 January 2012 16	Benfica	3 – 1	Gil Vicente	Estádio da Luz, Lisbon
20:15 WET	Cardozo 26'; Rodrigo 72'; Aimar 74'		Galo 39'	Attendance: 45,214; Referee: Marco Ferreira

29 January 2012 17	Gil Vicente	3 – 1	Porto	Estádio Cidade de Barcelos, Barcelos
19:15 WET	Cláudio 15', 45' (pen.); Cunha 52'		Varela 77'	Attendance: 7,439; Referee: Bruno Paixão

13 February 2012 18	Académica de Coimbra	0 – 2	Gil Vicente	Estádio Cidade de Coimbra, Coimbra
20:15 WET			Cláudio 13'; Vieira 77'	Attendance: 5,312; Referee: João Capela

18 February 2012 19	Gil Vicente	0 – 3	Braga	Estádio Cidade de Barcelos, Barcelos
20:15 WET			Lima 25', 50', 68'	Attendance: 7,846; Referee: Hugo Miguel

26 February 2012 20	Olhanense	0 – 0	Gil Vicente	Estádio José Arcanjo, Olhão
16:00 WET				Attendance: 1,830; Referee: Duarte Gomes

4 March 2012 21	Gil Vicente	1 – 2	Paços de Ferreira	Estádio Cidade de Barcelos, Barcelos
16:00 WEST	Zé Luís 17'		Melgarejo 41', 73'	Attendance: 4,078; Referee: Rui Patrício

11 March 2012 22	Beira-Mar	1 – 0	Gil Vicente	Estádio Municipal de Aveiro, Aveiro
16:00 WEST	Chengdong 61'			Attendance: 2,299; Referee: Hugo Pacheco

19 March 2012 23	Gil Vicente	2 – 0	Sporting CP	Estádio Cidade de Barcelos, Barcelos
20:45 WEST	Galo 13'; Cláudio 54' (pen.)			Attendance: 7,841; Referee: Bruno Paixão

26 March 2012 24	Marítimo	3 – 2	Gil Vicente	Estádio dos Barreiros, Funchal
18:00 WEST	Héldon 3'; Fidélis 65'; Pouga 85'		Zé Luís 43'; Carlos 44'	Attendance: 7,841; Referee: Bruno Paixão

1 April 2012 25	Gil Vicente	0 – 1	Vitória de Setúbal	Estádio Cidade de Barcelos, Barcelos
16:00 WEST			Santos 83'	Attendance: 3,722; Referee: Artur Soares Dias

6 April 2012 26	União de Leiria	0 – 0	Gil Vicente	Estádio Municipal da Marinha Grande, Marinha Grande
17:00 WEST				Attendance: 683; Referee: Bruno Esteves

22 April 2012 27	Gil Vicente	0 – 0	Rio Ave	Estádio Cidade de Barcelos, Barcelos
16:00 WEST				Attendance: 4,215; Referee: Nuno Almeida

28 April 2012 28	Gil Vicente	3 – 1	Vitória de Guimarães	Estádio Cidade de Barcelos, Barcelos
18:00 WEST	Vilela 15', 60'; Galo 53'		Almeida 27' (o.g.)	Attendance: 3,841; Referee: Rui Costa

5 May 2012 29	Nacional	3 – 1	Gil Vicente	Estádio da Madeira, Funchal
20:30 WEST	Claudemir 45'; Keita 68'; Rondón 90'		Vieira 35'	Attendance: 1,582; Referee: Manuel Mota

12 May 2012 30	Gil Vicente	3 – 1	Feirense	Estádio Cidade de Barcelos, Barcelos
18:30 WEST	Vieira 42'; Zé Luís 77', 82'		Rosado 47'	Attendance: 3,024; Referee: Duarte Gomes

=== Taça de Portugal ===
==== Matches ====
15 October 2011 3	Torreense	1 – 0	Gil Vicente	Campo Manuel Marques, Torres Vedras
18:00 WEST	Ricardinho 80'			Attendance: 2,800; Referee: Bruno Paixão

=== Taça da Liga ===
==== Second round ====
27 October 2011 First leg	Belenenses	2 – 1	Gil Vicente	Estádio do Restelo, Lisbon
16:00 WET	Rodrigo António 5'; Lemos 88' (pen.)		Guilherme 16' (pen.)	Attendance: 629; Referee: Duarte Gomes

12 November 2011 Second leg	Gil Vicente	2 – 0	Belenenses	Estádio Cidade de Barcelos, Barcelos
20:15 WET	Cláudio 51' (pen.); Luís Carlos 57'			Attendance: 3,964; Referee: Rui Costa

==== Group stage ====
2 January 2012 1	Gil Vicente	2 – 1	Moreirense	Estádio Cidade de Barcelos, Barcelos
16:00 WET	Luís Carlos 48', 78'		Pintassilgo 53'	Attendance: 1,383; Referee: Artur Soares Dias

18 January 2012 2	Rio Ave	1 – 1	Gil Vicente	Estádio do Rio Ave F.C., Vila do Conde
16:00 WET	Tomás 60' (pen.)		Yéro 70'	Attendance: 947; Referee: Duarte Gomes

4 February 2012 3	Sporting CP	0 – 1	Gil Vicente	Estádio José Alvalade, Lisbon
20:30 WET			Cláudio 54' (pen.)	Attendance: 23,801; Referee: Bruno Esteves

==== Knockout phase ====
22 March 2012 Semi-finals	Gil Vicente	2 – 2 (4 – 2 p)	Braga	Estádio Cidade de Barcelos, Barcelos
20:15 WET	Vieira 16'; Júnior Caiçara 90'		Lima 25'; Barbosa 31'	Attendance: 11,138; Referee: Hugo Miguel
	Penalties
	Vilela (penalty scored); Cláudio (penalty scored); Galo (penalty scored); Júnior Caiçara (penalty scored)		Lima (penalty scored); Custódio (penalty scored); Barbosa (penalty missed); Ukra (penalty missed)

14 April 2012 Final	Benfica	2 – 1	Gil Vicente	Estádio Cidade de Coimbra, Coimbra
20:45 WET	Rodrigo 30'; Saviola 84'		Zé Luís 78'	Attendance: 22,952; Referee: Jorge Sousa

== Squad ==
=== Appearances ===
No.	Pos.	Name	League		Cup		League Cup		Total		Discipline	
No.	Pos.	Name	Apps	Goals	Apps	Goals	Apps	Goals	Apps	Goals	Yellow card	Red card
1	GK	(Brazil) Adriano Facchini	30	0	0	0	5	0	35	0	3	0
2	DF	(Brazil) Rodrigo Galo	14(2)	3	1	0	4	0	19(2)	3	2	1
3	DF	(Portugal) João Pedro	3	0	0	0	2	0	5	0	0	0
4	DF	(Portugal) Sandro Cunha	5	0	0	0	2	0	7	0	1	0
5	MF	(Portugal) Rui Faria	0	0	0	0	0	0	0	0	0	0
6	DF	(Portugal) Daniel Faria	17(1)	0	0(1)	0	4	0	21(2)	0	3	0
7	FW	(Brazil) Laionel	9(5)	2	1	0	2	0	12(5)	2	1	0
8	MF	(Portugal) Pedro Moreira	11(2)	0	1	0	1	0	13(2)	0	6	1
9	FW	(Portugal) Tó Barbosa	0(8)	0	0	0	2	0	2(8)	0	1	0
10	MF	(Portugal) André Cunha	25	2	0	0	5	0	30	2	4	0
11	MF	(Cape Verde) Sidnei	1	0	0	0	1(1)	0	2(1)	0	0	0
12	FW	(Brazil) Leandrinho	0	0	0	0	0	0	0	0	0	0
14	FW	(Senegal) Kalidou Yéro	0(6)	0	0(1)	0	1(1)	1	1(8)	1	0	0
16	DF	(Brazil) Paulão	4(5)	0	0	0	0(2)	0	4(7)	0	1	0
19	MF	(Brazil) Mauro	4(4)	0	0	0	1(3)	0	5(7)	0	4	0
20	DF	(Brazil) Éder Sciola	9(3)	0	1	0	1(1)	0	11(4)	0	2	1
21	GK	(Portugal) Jorge Baptista	0	0	1	0	2	0	3	0	0	0
22	DF	(Portugal) Paulo Arantes	1	0	0	0	1	0	2	0	1	0
25	MF	(Portugal) César Peixoto	6(4)	0	0	0	2	0	8(4)	0	3	0
29	FW	(Brazil) Roberto	4(8)	1	0	0	3	0	7(8)	1	2	0
30	FW	(Portugal) Bruno Filipe	0(1)	0	0(1)	0	0	0	0(2)	0	1	0
40	MF	(Brazil) Guilherme	6(13)	0	1	0	2(4)	1	9(17)	1	5	0
44	DF	(Brazil) Cláudio	26	8	1	0	5	2	32	10	8	1
54	DF	(Brazil) Halisson	24	0	1	0	5	0	30	0	2	0
58	FW	(Brazil) Luís Carlos	17(5)	1	1	0	3(2)	3	21(7)	4	4	0
66	FW	(Portugal) Luís Manuel	26(1)	0	1	0	6(1)	0	32(2)	0	8	0
70	FW	(Portugal) Hugo Vieira	24(4)	6	0	0	5	1	29(4)	7	3	0
77	MF	(Portugal) João Vilela	7(3)	3	0	0	2	0	9(3)	3	2	0
79	GK	(Portugal) Vítor Murta	0(1)	0	0	0	0	0	0(1)	0	0	0
80	DF	(Brazil) Júnior Caiçara	28	0	1	0	5(1)	1	34(1)	1	10	1
89	MF	(Brazil) Richard Almeida	25(4)	0	1	0	6(1)	0	32(5)	0	5	0
99	FW	(Cape Verde) Zé Luís	4(9)	4	0	0	0(3)	1	4(12)	5	0	0
—	–	Own goals	–	1	–	0	–	0	–	1	–	–

=== Top scorers ===
The list is sorted by shirt number when total goals are equal.

Rnk	Pos	No.	Player	League	Cup	League Cup	Total
1	DF	44	(Brazil) Cláudio	8	0	2	10
2	FW	70	(Portugal) Hugo Vieira	6	0	1	7
3	FW	99	(Cape Verde) Zé Luís	4	0	1	5
4	FW	58	(Brazil) Luís Carlos	1	0	3	4
5	DF	2	(Brazil) Rodrigo Galo	3	0	0	3
5	MF	77	(Portugal) João Vilela	3	0	0	3
7	FW	7	(Brazil) Laionel	2	0	0	2
7	MF	10	(Portugal) André Cunha	2	0	0	2
9	FW	14	(Senegal) Kalidou Yéro	0	0	1	1
9	FW	29	(Brazil) Roberto	1	0	0	1
9	MF	40	(Brazil) Guilherme	0	0	1	1
9	DF	80	(Brazil) Júnior Caiçara	0	0	1	1
Own goals				1	0	0	1
TOTALS				31	0	10	41

=== Clean sheets ===
The list is sorted by shirt number when total appearances are equal.

Rnk	Pos	No.	Player	League	Cup	League Cup	Total
1	GK	1	(Brazil) Adriano Facchini	10	0	2	12
2	GK	21	(Portugal) Jorge Baptista	0	0	0	0
2	GK	79	(Portugal) Vítor Murta	0	0	0	0
TOTALS				10	0	2	12

=== Summary ===
Games played	38 (30 Primeira Liga) (1 Taça de Portugal) (8 Taça da Liga)
Games won	11 (8 Primeira Liga) (0 Taça de Portugal) (3 Taça da Liga)
Games drawn	12 (10 Primeira Liga) (0 Taça de Portugal) (2 Taça da Liga)
Games lost	15 (12 Primeira Liga) (1 Taça de Portugal) (2 Taça da Liga)
Goals scored	41 (31 Primeira Liga) (0 Taça de Portugal) (10 Taça da Liga)
Goals conceded	51 (42 Primeira Liga) (1 Taça de Portugal) (8 Taça da Liga)
Goal difference	–10 (–11 Primeira Liga) (–1 Taça de Portugal) (+2 Taça da Liga)
Clean sheets	12 (10 Primeira Liga) (0 Taça de Portugal) (2 Taça da Liga)
Most appearances	37 (Brazil) Richard Almeida
Top scorer	10 (Brazil) Cláudio
