= 2012 Taça da Liga final =

- Event: 2011–12 Taça da Liga
Benfica	Gil Vicente
2	1
- Date: 14 April 2012
- Venue: Estádio Cidade de Coimbra, Coimbra
- Man of the Match: Axel Witsel
- Referee: Jorge Sousa
- Attendance: 23,452

The 2012 Taça da Liga final was the final match of the 2011–12 Taça da Liga, the 5th season of the Taça da Liga. It was played on 14 April 2012 at the Estádio Cidade de Coimbra in Coimbra, between Benfica and Gil Vicente. Benfica won 2–1 and claimed their fourth consecutive title. The winners also received €1 million in prize money, while the runners-up received €350,000.

The competition involved the 32 clubs playing in the top two tiers of the Portuguese football league system – the Primeira Liga and the Segunda Liga – during the 2011–12 season. Benfica were the three-time defending champions and, as such, participated in their fourth consecutive final. In contrast, it was Gil Vicente's first-ever final in any national competition. Before this match, Benfica were on a 19-match unbeaten run in this competition, with their last defeat coming in a fourth round match against Vitória de Setúbal in October 2007.

== Background ==
Benfica will go into the match as the Taça da Liga title holder, having won the previous three finals, in 2009, 2010 and 2011. This will be the first ever appearance by Gil Vicente in any final. Both teams started at different stages in the competition. Gil started in the second round, having been promoted from the Liga de Honra the previous season. Benfica started in the third round as they finished in the top eight of the 2010–11 Primeira Liga.

Benfica topped Group B with three wins from three games. In the first game of the group stage, they beat Vitória de Guimarães 4–1 at the Estádio D. Afonso Henriques. Their next two group stage games were at home; they beat Liga de Honra side Santa Clara 2–0 before also recording a 3–0 win against Marítimo. This qualified the team for the semi-final, in which they played at home against bitter rivals Porto. Benfica won the game 3–2. The semi-final is so far the most viewed program of the year in Portugal, with approximately 4.6 million viewers.

Gil Vicente started their Taça da Liga campaign back in October 2011 in the second round. They were drawn against Belenenses, where they overcame the Liga de Honra side in a two-legged fixture. Following a 2–1 away loss, Gil turned the deficit around with a 2–0 win over Lisbon side at the Estádio Cidade de Barcelos. In the third round, Gil were drawn in Group A against Moreirense, Rio Ave and Sporting CP. In their first group game, they defeated Moreirense 2–1. Their second group game saw them draw with fellow first division side Rio Ave 1–1. Their last group, a winner-takes all affair against Sporting CP at the Estádio José Alvalade, ended 1–0 to Gil. Gil Vicente topped Group A with seven points and progressed to the semi-final stage, where they played Braga. Gil defeated Braga on penalties after a 2–2 draw.

== Route to the final ==
Note: In all results below, the score of the finalist is given first (H: home; A: away).

Benfica			Round	Gil Vicente		
Opponent	Result	Stadium	First round	Opponent	Result	Stadium
Bye			First round	Bye		
Opponent	Result	Stadium	Second round	Opponent	Result	Stadium
Bye			First leg	Belenenses	1–2 (A)	Estádio do Restelo
Bye			Second leg	Belenenses	2–0 (H)	Estádio Cidade de Barcelos
Opponent	Result	Stadium	Third round	Opponent	Result	Stadium
Vitória de Guimarães	4–1 (A)	Estádio D. Afonso Henriques	Matchday 1	Moreirense	2–1 (H)	Estádio Cidade de Barcelos
Santa Clara	2–0 (H)	Estádio da Luz	Matchday 2	Rio Ave	1–1 (A)	Estádio dos Arcos
Marítimo	3–0 (H)	Estádio da Luz	Matchday 3	Sporting CP	1–0 (A)	Estádio de Alvalade
Group B winners: Team / Pld / W / D / L / GF / GA / GD / Pts; Benfica / 3 / 3 / 0 / 0 / 9 / 1 / +8 / 9; Marítimo / 3 / 2 / 0 / 1 / 4 / 3 / +1 / 6; Santa Clara / 3 / 1 / 0 / 2 / 1 / 4 / −3 / 3; Vitória de Guimarães / 3 / 0 / 0 / 3 / 1 / 7 / −6 / 0			Final standings	Group A winners: Team / Pld / W / D / L / GF / GA / GD / Pts; Gil Vicente / 3 / 2 / 1 / 0 / 4 / 2 / +2 / 7; Moreirense / 3 / 1 / 1 / 1 / 3 / 3 / 0 / 4; Sporting CP / 3 / 0 / 2 / 1 / 2 / 3 / −1 / 2; Rio Ave / 3 / 0 / 2 / 1 / 2 / 3 / −1 / 2		
Opponent	Result	Stadium	Knockout phase	Opponent	Result	Stadium
Porto	3–2 (H)	Estádio da Luz	Semi-finals	Braga	2–2 (4–2p) (H)	Estádio Cidade de Barcelos

== Match ==
=== Summary ===
Prior to the match, referee Jorge Sousa was awarded the right to officiate the final by the LPFP, the LPFP also selected fellow referees Pedro Garcia and Paulo Soares as the assistant referees, while Rui Costa was selected as the fourth official.

The match began with Benfica starting quickest in the starting blocks, in the opening 45 minutes Benfica dominated the ball possession creating several chances. Benfica scored after creating several changes thanks to an attack by Bruno César down the left wing in which he crossed in the box for Rodrigo to open the scoring 30 minutes into the game. Benfica went into the break leading 1–0 and came back into the second half dominating again as they did in the first half. In the 78th minute, Gil Vicente received a corner in which they capitalized from after several blocked attempts from Benfica's defence; Zé Luís put the ball in the back of the net, beating Benfica goalkeeper Eduardo. Six minutes later, the winning goal came from Benfica substitute Javier Saviola after Gil Vicente's goalkeeper blocked Axel Witsel's shot, which led to the ball falling to the Argentine in which he slotted the ball home into the opposition's empty goal. Benfica's Witsel was named man of the match.

=== Details ===
14 April 2012
20:45 UTC

Benfica	2–1	Gil Vicente
Rodrigo 30'; Saviola 84'	Report	Zé Luís 78'

Estádio Cidade de Coimbra, Coimbra, Portugal
Attendance: 22,952
Referee: Jorge Sousa

Benfica	Gil Vicente

GK	47	(Portugal) Eduardo
RB	14	(Uruguay) Maxi Pereira (c)
CB	33	(Brazil) Jardel
CB	24	(Argentina) Ezequiel Garay
LB	38	(Spain) Joan Capdevila
DM	21	(Serbia) Nemanja Matić
CM	28	(Belgium) Axel Witsel
LW	8	(Brazil) Bruno César	(yellow card) 86'
AM	10	(Argentina) Pablo Aimar	(substituted off) 62'
RW	19	(Spain) Rodrigo	(substituted off) 82'
CF	16	(Portugal) Nélson Oliveira	(substituted off) 45'
Substitutes:
GK	1	(Brazil) Artur
DF	3	(Brazil) Emerson
MF	6	(Spain) Javi García
MF	20	(Argentina) Nicolás Gaitán	(yellow card) 81'	(substituted on) 45'
FW	7	(Paraguay) Óscar Cardozo	(substituted on) 62'
FW	9	(Spain) Nolito
FW	30	(Argentina) Javier Saviola	(yellow card) 86'	(substituted on) 82'
Manager:
(Portugal) Jorge Jesus

GK	1	(Brazil) Adriano Facchini
RB	2	(Brazil) Rodrigo Galo
CB	44	(Brazil) Cláudio	(yellow card) 85'
CB	54	(Brazil) Halisson
LB	80	(Brazil) Júnior Caiçara
DM	10	(Portugal) André Cunha (c)
CM	25	(Portugal) César Peixoto
LW	66	(Portugal) Luís Manuel	(yellow card) 50'	(substituted off) 56'
AM	58	(Brazil) Luís Carlos	(substituted off) 67'
RW	70	(Portugal) Hugo Vieira
CF	89	(Brazil) Richard	(substituted off) 76'
Substitutes:
GK	21	(Portugal) Jorge Baptista
DF	16	(Brazil) Paulão
MF	20	(Brazil) Éder
MF	40	(Brazil) Guilherme	(substituted on) 67'
FW	77	(Portugal) João Vilela	(substituted on) 76'
FW	9	(Portugal) Tó Barbosa
FW	99	(Cape Verde) Zé Luís	(yellow card) 56'	(substituted on) 56'
Manager:
(Portugal) Paulo Alves

2011–12 Taça da Liga Winners
Sport Lisboa e Benfica
4th Title

Match officials

- Assistant referees:
  - Pedro Garcia
  - Paulo Soares
- Fourth official: Rui Costa

Man of the match

- Axel Witsel (Benfica)

Match rules

- 90 minutes.
- Penalty shootout if scores still level.
- Seven named substitutes.
- Maximum of three substitutions.

== See also ==
- 2011–12 S.L. Benfica season
- 2012 Taça de Portugal final
