= 2012–13 Sporting CP season =

Sporting CP
2012–13 season
- President: Luís Godinho Lopes (until 23 March 2013); Bruno de Carvalho
- Manager: Jesualdo Ferreira
- Stadium: Estádio José Alvalade
- Primeira Liga: 7th
- Taça de Portugal: Third round
- Taça da Liga: Third round
- UEFA Europa League: Group stage
- Top goalscorer: League: Ricky van Wolfswinkel (14); All: Ricky van Wolfswinkel (20)
- Highest home attendance: 35,114 vs Benfica (10 December)
- Lowest home attendance: 6,157 vs Paços de Ferreira (9 January)
Home colours	Away colours	Third colours

The 2012–13 season is Sporting Clube de Portugal's 80th season in the top flight, the Primeira Liga, known as the Liga ZON Sagres for sponsorship purposes. This article shows player statistics and all matches that the club plays during the 2012–13 season.

It is considered to be the worst season ever in Sporting's history. The club ended in the seventh place in the league table, the lowest position in the club's history, thus failing to qualify for the following season's UEFA Champions League and UEFA Europa League. Sporting were also eliminated from the Europa League group stage for the first time ever, ending in fourth place.

== Competitions ==
=== Legend ===
Win Draw Loss Postponed

=== Primeira Liga ===
==== League table ====
Pos	Team	Pld	W	D	L	GF	GA	GD	Pts	Qualification or relegation
5	Estoril	30	13	6	11	47	37	+10	45	Qualification for the Europa League third qualifying round
6	Rio Ave	30	12	6	12	35	42	−7	42 (Note: Rio Ave ahead of Sporting CP on head-to-head record; Rio Ave–Sporting CP 2–1, Sporting CP–Rio Ave 0–1)	
7	Sporting CP	30	11	9	10	36	36	0	42	
8	Nacional	30	11	7	12	45	51	−6	40 (Note: Nacional ahead of Vitória de Guimarães on head-to-head record; Nacional–Vitória de Guimarães 2–1, Vitória de Guimarães–Nacional 1–3)	
9	Vitória de Guimarães	30	11	7	12	36	47	−11	40	Qualification for the Europa League group stage (Note: Vitória de Guimarães qualified for the group stage of 2013–14 UEFA Europa League after winning the 2012–13 Taça de Portugal.)

Source: LPFP (in Portuguese)
Rules for classification: 1) Points; 2) Head-to-head points; 3) Head-to-head goal difference; 4) Head-to-head away goals scored; 5) Goal difference; 6) Matches won; 7) Goals scored; 8) Play-off.
(Note: LPFP decided that only criteria 1, 5, 6 and 7 would be applied to establish the classification during the competition.)

==== Results by round ====
Round	1	2	3	4	5	6	7	8	9	10	11	12	13	14	15	16	17	18	19	20	21	22	23	24	25	26	27	28	29	30
Ground	A	H	A	H	H	A	H	A	H	A	H	A	H	A	H	H	A	H	A	A	H	A	H	A	H	A	H	A	H	A
Result	D	L	D	W	D	L	D	L	W	D	L	D	L	W	W	D	L	L	W	L	D	D	W	W	W	L	W	L	W	W
Position	12	12	13	7	5	12	10	13	10	10	11	10	12	9	8	9	9	10	9	11	10	10	10	8	7	9	7	7	7	7

Updated to match(es) played on 19 May 2013. Source: LPFP
A = Away; H = Home; W = Win; D = Draw; L = Loss

==== Matches ====
19 August 2012 1	Vitória de Guimarães	0–0	Sporting CP	Guimarães
20:30	Barrientos (yellow card) 28'; R. Pereira (yellow card) 36'; Teles (yellow card) 55'; Alex (yellow card) 74'	Report	Van Wolfswinkel (yellow card) 41'; Rojo (yellow card) 54'; Carrillo (yellow card) 65'; Martins (yellow card) 80'; Cédric (yellow card) 90+1'	Stadium: Estádio D. Afonso Henriques; Attendance: 15,683; Referee: João Capela

27 August 2012 2	Sporting CP	0–1	Rio Ave	Lisbon
20:15	Fernandes (yellow card) 69'; Cédric (yellow card) 74'; Rojo (yellow card) 76'; Carrillo (yellow card) 81'	Report	Edimar 40'; Filipe Augusto (yellow card) 55'; Lionn (yellow card) 76'	Stadium: Estádio José Alvalade; Attendance: 30,991; Referee: Marco Ferreira

16 September 2012 3	Marítimo	1–1	Sporting CP	Funchal, Madeira
20:15	Roberge (yellow card) 58'; João Guilherme 87'; Rafael (yellow card) 90+3'	Report	Van Wolfswinkel 55'; Fernandes (yellow card) 62'; Izmailov (yellow card) 65'	Stadium: Estádio dos Barreiros; Attendance: 4,400; Referee: Carlos Xistra

23 September 2012 4	Sporting CP	2–1	Gil Vicente	Lisbon
20:15	Rojo (yellow card) 44'; Labyad (yellow card) 46' (yellow-red card) 89'; Capel 74'; Van Wolfswinkel 85'; Cédric (yellow card) 90+1'; Patrício (yellow card) 90+2'	Report	Luís Carlos 7'; Pereira (yellow card) 19'; Faria (yellow card) 22'; Brito (yellow card) 51'; Cláudio (yellow card) 89'	Stadium: Estádio José Alvalade; Attendance: 25,523; Referee: Vasco Santos

29 September 2012 5	Sporting CP	2–2	Estoril	Lisbon
18:15	Cédric (yellow card) 44'; Anderson Luís 75' (o.g.); Van Wolfswinkel 83'; Rinaudo (yellow card) 90'	Report	Licá (yellow card) 15'; Vitória 45' (pen.); Santos (yellow card) 51' (yellow-red card) 60'; Leal 57'; Anderson Luís (yellow card) 88'; Evandro (yellow card) 90+2'	Stadium: Estádio José Alvalade; Attendance: 35,003; Referee: Nuno Miguel Serrano Almeida

7 October 2012 6	Porto	2–0	Sporting CP	Porto
20:45	Martínez 9'; González (yellow card) 24'; Rodríguez (yellow card) 26', (goal) 83'; Fernando (yellow card) 40'; Alex Sandro (yellow card) 79'	Report	Schaars (yellow card) 34'; Carrillo (yellow card) 40'; Izmailov (yellow card) 51'; Pranjić (yellow card) 66'; Silva (yellow card) 68'; Rojo (yellow card) 70' (yellow-red card) 72'; Elias (yellow card) 82'; Boulahrouz (yellow card) 83'; Van Wolfswinkel (yellow card) 88'	Stadium: Estádio do Dragão; Attendance: 38,909; Referee: Jorge Sousa

28 October 2012 7	Sporting CP	0–0	Académica	Lisbon
20:15	Silva (yellow card) 44'; Rinaudo (yellow card) 72'; Pranjić (yellow card) 78'; Viola (yellow card) 81'; Van Wolfswinkel (yellow card) 87'; Izmailov (yellow card) 89'	Report	Flávio (yellow card) 15'; Galo (yellow card) 33'; Lopes (yellow card) 88'	Stadium: Estádio José Alvalade; Attendance: 25,056; Referee: Bruno Esteves

4 November 2012 8	Vitória de Setúbal	2–1	Sporting CP	Setúbal
20:15	Santos 29'; Silva (yellow card) 49'; Tavares (yellow card) 57'; Meyong 68'; Nélson (yellow card) 70'; Lourenço (yellow card) 76'; Jorginho (yellow card) 90+4'	Report	Cédric (yellow card) 35'; Jeffrén 42'; Van Wolfswinkel (yellow card) 49'; Rinaudo (yellow card) 63'	Stadium: Estádio do Bonfim; Attendance: 4,288; Referee: Paulo Baptista

11 November 2012 9	Sporting CP	1–0	Braga	Lisbon
20:15	Van Wolfswinkel 4'; Elias (yellow card) 27'; Rojo (yellow card) 45+1'; Dier (yellow card) 50'; Fernandes (yellow card) 82'; Patrício (yellow card) 90+4'	Report	Salino (yellow card) 11'; Echiéjilé (yellow card) 30'; Coelho (yellow card) 44'; Viana (yellow card) 50'	Stadium: Estádio José Alvalade; Attendance: 24,954; Referee: Pedro Proença

25 November 2012 10	Moreirense	2–2	Sporting CP	Moreira de Cónegos, Guimarães
20:15	Olivera 40'; Ghilas 45'; Júlio César (yellow card) 80'	Report	Xandão 64'; Dier 65'; Carrillo (yellow card) 77'; Rinaudo (yellow card) 90+6'	Stadium: Parque Joaquim de Almeida Freitas; Attendance: 2,208; Referee: Hugo Miguel

10 December 2012 11	Sporting CP	1–3	Benfica	Lisbon
20:15	Van Wolfswinkel 30'; Carrillo (yellow card) 69'; Boulahrouz (red card) 81'; Rinaudo (yellow card) 84'; Rojo (yellow card) 89'	Report	Pereira (yellow card) 20'; Matić (yellow card) 45'; Cardozo 59', 81' (pen.), 86'	Stadium: Estádio José Alvalade; Attendance: 35,114; Referee: Marco Ferreira

15 December 2012 12	Nacional	1–1	Sporting CP	Funchal
19:00	Isael 25'; Jota (yellow card) 77'; Aurélio (yellow card) 90+3'	Report	Fernandes (yellow card) 47'; Cédric 69', (yellow card) 75'	Stadium: Estádio da Madeira; Attendance: 1,437; Referee: Artur Soares Dias

5 January 2013 13	Sporting CP	0–1	Paços de Ferreira	Lisbon
18:00		Report	Valente (yellow card) 41'; Hurtado 45+1'; Josué (yellow card) 51'; Leão (yellow card) 79'; Cássio (yellow card) 90+3'	Stadium: Estádio José Alvalade; Attendance: 20,613; Referee: Rui Silva

13 January 2013 14	Olhanense	0–2	Sporting CP	Olhão
18:00		Report	Labyad 3'; Jeffrén (yellow card) 18'; Silva (yellow card) 28', (goal) 54'; Lopes (yellow card) 58'; Carrillo (yellow card) 68'; Rinaudo (yellow card) 72'	Stadium: Estádio José Arcanjo; Attendance: 3,215; Referee: Hugo Pacheco

20 January 2013 15	Sporting CP	1–0	Beira-Mar	Lisbon
20:00	Silva (yellow card) 47'; Carrillo 63'; Boulahrouz (yellow card) 72'	Report	Moreira (yellow card) 24'; Fleurival (yellow card) 38'; Ribeiro (yellow card) 85'; Sampaio (yellow card) 90+2'	Stadium: Estádio José Alvalade; Attendance: 19,493; Referee: Cosme Machado

27 January 2013 16	Sporting CP	1–1	Vitória de Guimarães	Lisbon
18:00	Van Wolfswinkel 55'; Jeffrén (yellow card) 90'	Report	R. Pereira (yellow card) 14'; Xandão 53' (o.g.); Barrientos (yellow card) 69'; Crivellaro (yellow card) 80'; Sá (yellow card) 86'	Stadium: Estádio José Alvalade; Attendance: 26,505; Referee: Carlos Xistra

2 February 2013 17	Rio Ave	2–1	Sporting CP	Vila do Conde
18:00	Lopes (yellow card) 27'; Tarantini (yellow card) 36'; Lionn (yellow card) 43'; Joãozinho 45' (o.g.); Mendes 53' (o.g.); Braga (yellow card) 78'	Report	Jeffrén 7'	Stadium: Estádio do Rio Ave FC; Attendance: 2,356; Referee: João Capela

10 February 2013 18	Sporting CP	0–1	Marítimo	Lisbon
16:00	Silva (yellow card) 28'	Report	Suk 18', (yellow card) 90'; João Diogo (yellow card) 49'; Sami (yellow card) 57'; Ferreira (yellow card) 63'; Salin (yellow card) 78'; Kukula (yellow card) 90+3'	Stadium: Estádio José Alvalade; Attendance: 24,169; Referee: Duarte Gomes

16 February 2013 19	Gil Vicente	2–3	Sporting CP	Barcelos
20:15	Vieira 20', 53'; Cláudio (yellow card) 43'; Peixoto (yellow card) 65'; Paulo Jorge (yellow card) 70'; Martins (yellow card) 79'	Report	Bruma 2'; Ilori 7'; Capel 63'; Rinaudo (yellow card) 64'; Dier (yellow card) 85'; Joãozinho (yellow card) 90'	Stadium: Estádio Cidade de Barcelos; Attendance: 3,963; Referee: Artur Soares Dias

22 February 2013 20	Estoril	3–1	Sporting CP	Estoril
20:00	Jefferson 33', (yellow card) 33'; Vitória 39'; Santos (yellow card) 43'; Mano (yellow card) 75'; Carlos Eduardo 77'	Report	Van Wolfswinkel 4'; Rojo (yellow card) 25'; Patrício (yellow card) 39'	Stadium: Estádio António Coimbra da Mota; Attendance: 3,227; Referee: Hugo Miguel

2 March 2013 21	Sporting CP	0–0	Porto	Lisbon
20:45	Rojo (yellow card) 43' (yellow-red card) 77'; Carrillo (yellow card) 79'; Lopes (yellow card) 89'; Bruma (yellow card) 90'	Summary	Izmailov (yellow card) 37'; Maicon (yellow card) 80'; Fernando (yellow card) 86'	Stadium: Estádio José Alvalade; Attendance: 27,436; Referee: Paulo Baptista

9 March 2013 22	Académica	1–1	Sporting CP	Coimbra
20:15	Eduardo 25'; Cabral (yellow card) 74'; Marcos Paulo (yellow card) 77'; Ricardo (yellow card) 90+2'	Report	Fokobo (yellow card) 25'; Cédric (yellow card) 45'; Van Wolfswinkel 78'	Stadium: Estádio Cidade de Coimbra; Attendance: 6,086; Referee: Hugo Pacheco

16 March 2013 23	Sporting CP	2–1	Vitória de Setúbal	Lisbon
20:15	Amoreirinha 15' (o.g.); Labyad 22'; Ilori (yellow card) 56'	Report	Santos (yellow card) 20'; Makukula 34'; Queirós (yellow card) 44'	Stadium: Estádio José Alvalade; Attendance: 22,385; Referee: Marco Ferreira

30 March 2013 24	Braga	2–3	Sporting CP	Braga
16:00	Echiéjilé 25'; Carlão 35'; Santos (yellow card) 76'	Report	Van Wolfswinkel 9', 28', 90+2'; Joãozinho (yellow card) 57' (yellow-red card) 71'; Martins (yellow card) 62'	Stadium: Estádio Municipal de Braga; Attendance: 12,970; Referee: Jorge Sousa

6 April 2013 25	Sporting CP	3–2	Moreirense	Lisbon
20:30	Martins (yellow card) 21'; Capel 40'; Van Wolfswinkel 66'; Viola 90+4'	Report	Gonçalves (yellow card) 6'; Anilton (yellow card) 40'; Ghilas 47'; Renato Augusto (yellow card) 55'; Capela 72'; Andrade (yellow card) 90+1'	Stadium: Estádio José Alvalade; Attendance: 26,696; Referee: Artur Soares Dias

21 April 2013 26	Benfica	2–0	Sporting CP	Lisbon
21:15	Salvio 36'; Luisão (yellow card) 66'; Lima 75'	Summary	Viola (yellow card) 84'; Rinaudo (yellow card) 89'	Stadium: Estádio da Luz; Attendance: 62,553; Referee: João Capela

28 April 2013 27	Sporting CP	2–1	Nacional	Lisbon
18:00	Capel 5'; Rojo 86', (yellow card) 86'	Report	Ghazal (yellow card) 41'; Marçal (yellow card) 45'; Candeias 74', (yellow card) 90'; Campos (yellow card) 78'; Rodrigues (yellow card) 86'; Moreira (red card) 90'	Stadium: Estádio José Alvalade; Attendance: 30,132; Referee: Jorge Ferreira

5 May 2013 28	Paços de Ferreira	1–0	Sporting CP	Paços de Ferreira
20:15	Ricardo (yellow card) 35'; Tony 75'; Luíz Carlos (yellow card) 83'; Josué (yellow card) 90'	Report	Rinaudo (yellow card) 74'; Silva (yellow card) 80'	Stadium: Estádio da Mata Real; Attendance: 2,802; Referee: Pedro Proença

12 May 2013 29	Sporting CP	1–0	Olhanense	Lisbon
16:00	Lopes (yellow card) 69'; Capel 73'; Zézinho (yellow card) 83'	Report	Evandro (yellow card) 35'; Souza (yellow card) 73'	Stadium: Estádio José Alvalade; Attendance: 23,747; Referee: Olegário Benquerença

19 May 2013 30	Beira-Mar	1–4	Sporting CP	Aveiro
18:30	Lopes (yellow card) 21'; Ribeiro (yellow card) 48', (goal) 69'; Bura (yellow card) 90+1'	Report	Silva 22', 90'; Van Wolfswinkel 28', 29'; Rojo (yellow card) 48'	Stadium: Estádio Municipal de Aveiro; Attendance: 6,735; Referee: Duarte Gomes

=== Taça de Portugal ===
21 October 2012 Third round	Moreirense	3–2	Sporting CP	Moreira de Cónegos
	Olivera 46', 62'; Wágner 90+7'	Report	Rinaudo 7'; Van Wolfswinkel 79'	Stadium: Parque Joaquim de Almeida Freitas; Referee: Marco Ferreira

=== Taça da Liga ===
==== Group stage ====
Team	Pld	W	D	L	GF	GA	GD	Pts
Rio Ave	3	2	0	1	6	3	+3	6
Paços de Ferreira	3	2	0	1	5	3	+2	6
Sporting CP	3	1	1	1	3	5	–2	4
Marítimo	3	0	1	2	2	5	–3	1

18 December 2012 1	Marítimo	2–2	Sporting CP	Funchal
18:15 (UTC+01)	Héldon 40'; Rafael 65'		Van Wolfswinkel 29'; Xandão 87'	Stadium: Estádio dos Barreiros; Referee: Olegário Benquerença

29 December 2012 2	Rio Ave	3–0	Sporting CP	Vila do Conde
19:45 (UTC+01)	Obadeyi 55'; Tarantini 65'; Hassan 90'	Report		Stadium: Estádio do Rio Ave FC; Attendance: 3,000; Referee: Rui Costa

9 January 2013 3	Sporting CP	1–0	Paços de Ferreira	Lisbon
17:00	Van Wolfswinkel 89'	Report		Stadium: Estádio José Alvalade; Attendance: 6,157; Referee: Paulo Baptista

=== UEFA Europa League ===
==== Play-off round ====
23 August 2012 First leg	Horsens (Denmark)	1–1	(Portugal) Sporting CP	Horsens, Denmark
21:00	Spellman 15'	Report	Carrillo 79'	Stadium: CASA Arena Horsens; Attendance: 6,644; Referee: Antony Gautier (France)

30 August 2012 Second leg	Sporting CP (Portugal)	5–0 (6–1 agg.)	(Denmark) Horsens	Lisbon, Portugal
21:30	Van Wolfswinkel 8', 54'; Kortegaard 23' (o.g.); Carrillo 57'; Elias 63'	Report	Kielstrup (yellow card) 52'	Stadium: Estádio José Alvalade; Attendance: 25,030; Referee: Cyril Zimmermann (Switzerland)

==== Group stage ====
Group G
Team	Pld	W	D	L	GF	GA	GD	Pts
(Belgium) Genk	6	3	3	0	9	4	+5	12
(Switzerland) Basel	6	2	3	1	7	4	+3	9
(Hungary) Videoton	6	2	0	4	6	8	−2	6
(Portugal) Sporting CP	6	1	2	3	4	10	−6	5

20 September 2012 1	Sporting CP (Portugal)	0–0	(Switzerland) Basel	Lisbon, Portugal
21:05	Rojo (yellow card) 30'; Xandão (red card) 50'; Fernandes (yellow card) 60'	Report	Park (yellow card) 67'; Streller (yellow card) 82'	Stadium: Estádio José Alvalade; Attendance: 22,325; Referee: Alon Yefet (Israel)

4 October 2012 2	Videoton (Hungary)	3–0	(Portugal) Sporting CP	Székesfehérvár, Hungary
19:00	Paulo Vinícius 15'; Oliveira 21'; N. Nikolić 35', (yellow card) 36'	Report		Stadium: Sóstói Stadion; Attendance: 10,160; Referee: Kristinn Jakobsson (Iceland)

25 October 2012 3	Genk (Belgium)	2–1	(Portugal) Sporting CP	Genk, Belgium
19:00	De Ceulaer 25'; Gorius (yellow card) 39'; Koulibaly (yellow card) 80'; Barda 88'	Report	Schaars 7'; Boulahrouz (yellow card) 12' (yellow-red card) 76'; Rinaudo (yellow card) 37'; Rojo (yellow card) 68'	Stadium: Cristal Arena; Attendance: 13,651; Referee: Szymon Marciniak (Poland

8 November 2012 4	Sporting CP (Portugal)	1–1	(Belgium) Genk	Lisbon, Portugal
20:05	Viola (yellow card) 14'; Schaars (yellow card) 29' (yellow-red card) 59'; Insúa (yellow card) 35'; Van Wolfswinkel 64'	Report	Koulibaly (yellow card) 25'; Ngongca (yellow card) 27'; Plet 90+1'; Vossen (yellow card) 90+4'	Stadium: Estádio José Alvalade; Attendance: 18,406; Referee: Stefan Johannesson (Sweden)

22 November 2012 5	Basel (Switzerland)	3–0	(Portugal) Sporting CP	Basel, Switzerland
19:00	Schär 23'; Cabral (yellow card) 54' (yellow-red card) 58'; Stocker 66'; D. Degen 71'; Ajeti (yellow card) 90+2'	Report	Insúa (yellow card) 35'; Labyad (yellow card) 41'; Fernandes (yellow card) 55'; Carrillo (yellow card) 61'	Stadium: St. Jakob-Park; Attendance: 15,566; Referee: Paolo Valeri (Italy)

7 December 2012 6	Sporting CP (Portugal)	2–1	(Hungary) Videoton	Lisbon, Portugal
21:05	Rinaudo (yellow card) 9'; Labyad 65', (yellow card) 82'; Cédric (yellow card) 75'; Viola 82'	Report	Walter (yellow card) 45'; Tóth (yellow card) 54'; Caneira (yellow card) 79' (yellow-red card) 90+4'; Sándor 80' (pen.), (red card) 83'; Paulo Vinícius (yellow card) 81'	Stadium: Estádio José Alvalade; Attendance: 8,080; Referee: Michael Koukoulakis (Greece)

== Players ==
Note: Flags indicate national team as defined under FIFA eligibility rules; some limited exceptions apply. Players may hold more than one non-FIFA nationality.

No.	Pos.	Nation	Player
1	GK	POR	Rui Patrício (Captain)
5	DF	POR	Joãozinho
6	DF	NED	Khalid Boulahrouz
7	MF	VEN	Jeffrén
8	MF	NED	Stijn Schaars (vice-captain)
9	FW	NED	Ricky van Wolfswinkel
11	MF	ESP	Diego Capel
12	GK	BRA	Marcelo Boeck
13	DF	POR	Miguel Lopes
15	DF	ARG	Marcos Rojo
16	FW	ARG	Valentín Viola
18	FW	PER	André Carrillo

No.	Pos.	Nation	Player
20	MF	MAR	Zakaria Labyad
21	MF	ARG	Fabián Rinaudo (vice-captain)
22	GK	POR	Hugo Ventura
23	MF	POR	Adrien Silva
28	MF	POR	André Martins
34	DF	POR	Tiago Ilori
40	DF	POR	Pedro Mendes
41	DF	POR	Cédric
47	MF	POR	Ricardo Esgaio
51	FW	POR	Bruma
54	DF	ENG	Eric Dier
90	MF	GBS	Zézinho

== Transfers ==
=== In ===
- Adrien Silva → Académica → Loan return
- Cédric → Académica → Loan return
- Marcos Rojo → Spartak Moscow → Undisclosed fee
- Valentín Viola → Racing Club → Undisclosed fee
- Danijel Pranjić → Bayern Munich → Free transfer
- Zakaria Labyad → PSV → Free transfer
- Khalid Boulahrouz → VfB Stuttgart → Free transfer
- Gelson Fernandes → Saint-Étienne → Free transfer
- Miguel Lopes → Porto → Free transfer
- Hugo Ventura → Porto → Free transfer
- Joãozinho → Beira-Mar → Loan

=== Out ===
- Agostinho Cá → Barcelona B → Undisclosed fee
- Amido Baldé → Vitória de Guimarães → Contract termination
- André Marques → Sion → End of contract
- Diogo Rosado → Blackburn Rovers → End of contract
- Edgar Ié → Barcelona B → Undisclosed fee
- João Pereira → Valencia → €3,684,210 + €526,320
- Mateus Fonseca → Chiasso → Free transfer
- Ricardo Batista → ? → End of contract
- Rodolfo Simões → Académico de Viseu → Free transfer
- Tiago Ferreira → End of career
- Marco Torsiglieri → Metalist Kharkiv → Undisclosed fee
- Ânderson Polga → São José → End of contract
- Celsinho → Târgu Mureș → End of contract
- Jaime Valdés → Parma → Undisclosed fee
- Matías Fernández → Fiorentina → €3,136,842 + €1,500,000
- Florent Sinama Pongolle → Rostov → Contract termination
- Mexer → Nacional → End of contract
- Alberto Rodríguez → Rio Ave → Contract termination
- Luis Aguiar → San Lorenzo de Almagro → Contract termination
- Sebastián Ribas → Genoa → Loan return
- Daniel Carriço → Reading → €750,000
- Marat Izmailov → Porto → € Free transfer
- Emiliano Insúa → Atlético Madrid → €3,500,000
- Bruno Pereirinha → Lazio → €2,000,000
- Xandão → Kuban Krasnodar → Loan return

=== Out on loan ===
Note: Flags indicate national team as defined under FIFA eligibility rules; some limited exceptions apply. Players may hold more than one non-FIFA nationality.

No.	Pos.	Nation	Player
14	DF	POR	Nuno Reis (at Olhanense until 30 June 2013)
28	DF	POR	João Gonçalves (at Vitória de Guimarães until 30 June 2013)
—	DF	POR	Miguel Serôdio (at Atlético CP until 30 June 2013)
24	DF	ARG	Leandro Grimi (at Godoy Cruz until 30 June 2013)
—	DF	FRA	Atila Turan (at Orduspor until 30 June 2013)
23	DF	USA	Oguchi Onyewu (at Málaga until 30 June 2013)
3	DF	BRA	Evaldo (at Deportivo La Coruña until 30 June 2013)
86	MF	SUI	Gélson Fernandes (at Sion until 30 June 2014)
77	MF	BRA	Elias (at Flamengo until 30 June 2013)

No.	Pos.	Nation	Player
30	MF	CRO	Danijel Pranjić (at Celta Vigo until 30 June 2013)
8	MF	POR	André Santos (at Deportivo La Coruña until 30 June 2013)
22	MF	POR	Diogo Salomão (at Deportivo La Coruña until 30 June 2013)
10	MF	BRA	Renato Neto (at Gent until 30 June 2013)
21	MF	POR	William Carvalho (at Cercle Brugge until 30 June 2013)
11	FW	GHA	William Owusu (at Westerlo until 30 June 2013)
28	FW	POR	Wilson Eduardo (at Académica until 30 June 2013)
30	FW	BUL	Valeri Bojinov (at Hellas Verona until 30 June 2013)
38	FW	IND	Sunil Chhetri (at Churchill Brothers until end of season)
