= List of Portuguese football transfers summer 2010 =

This is a list of Portuguese football transfers for the 2010 summer transfer window. The summer transfer window opened on 1 July and closed at midnight on 1 September. Only moves involving Portuguese Liga and Liga de Honra clubs are listed. Players without a club may join one at any time, either during or in between transfer windows.

== Transfers ==
| Date | Name | Moving from | Moving to | Fee |
|---|---|---|---|---|
| 3 December 2009 | (Portugal) Fábio Faria | (Portugal) Rio Ave | (Portugal) Benfica | €2,000,000 |
| 30 January 2010 | (Argentina) Franco Jara | (Argentina) Arsenal de Sarandí | (Portugal) Benfica | €5,500,000 |
| 4 February 2010 | (Slovenia) Rene Mihelič | (Slovenia) Maribor | (Portugal) Nacional | Undisclosed |
| 1 March 2010 | (Brazil) Ozéia | (Portugal) Paços de Ferreira | (Brazil) Grêmio | Loan |
| 9 April 2010 | (Brazil) William | (Portugal) Paços de Ferreira | (Russia) Anzhi | Free |
| 27 April 2010 | (Portugal) Hugo Machado | (Azerbaijan) Standard Sumgayit | (Portugal) Naval 1º de Maio | Undisclosed |
| 28 April 2010 | (Portugal) João Silva | (Portugal) Desportivo Aves | (England) Everton | €0,580,000 |
| 3 May 2010 | (Argentina) Nicolás Gaitán | (Argentina) Boca Juniors | (Portugal) Benfica | €8,400,000 |
| 12 May 2010 | (Brazil) Diego Ângelo | (Portugal) Naval 1º de Maio | (Italy) Genoa | Undisclosed |
| 13 May 2010 | (Portugal) Hélder Barbosa | (Portugal) Porto | (Portugal) Nacional | Free |
| 14 May 2010 | (Brazil) Mércio | (Portugal) Trofense | (Cyprus) Olympiakos Nicosia | Undisclosed |
| 14 May 2010 | (Portugal) Hélder Sousa | (Portugal) Trofense | (Cyprus) Olympiakos Nicosia | Undisclosed |
| 15 May 2010 | (Portugal) Carlos Fangueiro | (Portugal) Beira-Mar | (Vietnam) T&T Hà Nội | Free |
| 17 May 2010 | (Brazil) Diogo | (Portugal) Portimonense | (Portugal) Académica de Coimbra | Free |
| 17 May 2010 | (Portugal) João Pedro | (Portugal) Oliveirense | (Portugal) Naval 1º de Maio | Undisclosed |
| 17 May 2010 | (Portugal) Godinho | (Portugal) Oliveirense | (Portugal) Naval 1º de Maio | Undisclosed |
| 18 May 2010 | (Portugal) Márcio Madeira | (Portugal) Juventude de Évora | (Portugal) Nacional | Undisclosed |
| 19 May 2010 | (Portugal) Roderick | (Portugal) Benfica | (Portugal) Rio Ave | Loan |
| 19 May 2010 | (Portugal) Nuno Santos | (Portugal) Santa Clara | (Portugal) Paços de Ferreira | Undisclosed |
| 20 May 2010 | (Brazil) Elias | (Portugal) União de Leiria | (Portugal) Portimonense | Free |
| 20 May 2010 | (Portugal) André Vilas Boas | (Portugal) Rio Ave | (Portugal) Marítimo | Free |
| 20 May 2010 | (Portugal) Miguel Fidalgo | (Portugal) Nacional | (Portugal) Académica de Coimbra | Undisclosed |
| 21 May 2010 | (Brazil) Ney Santos | (Portugal) Braga | (Portugal) União de Leiria | Loan |
| 21 May 2010 | (Portugal) Fernando Alexandre | (Portugal) Braga | (Portugal) União de Leiria | Loan |
| 24 May 2010 | (Brazil) Leandro Tatu | (Portugal) Santa Clara | (Portugal) Beira-Mar | Undisclosed |
| 25 May 2010 | (Brazil) Luciano Amaral | (Brazil) Coritiba | (Portugal) Marítimo | Undisclosed |
| 25 May 2010 | (Brazil) Rodrigo Silva | (Portugal) Nacional | (Portugal) União de Leiria | Free |
| 25 May 2010 | (Brazil) Raí | (Brazil) Mogi Mirim | (Portugal) União de Leiria | Undisclosed |
| 25 May 2010 | (Montenegro) Vladan Giljen | (Montenegro) FK Sutjeska Nikšić | (Portugal) Nacional | Undisclosed |
| 25 May 2010 | (France) Romuald Peiser | (Portugal) Naval 1º de Maio | (Portugal) Académica de Coimbra | Free |
| 27 May 2010 | (Brazil) Marquinho | (Portugal) Vitória de Guimarães | (Portugal) Marítimo | Undisclosed |
| 27 May 2010 | (Portugal) Cícero | (Portugal) Oliveirense | (Portugal) Rio Ave | Undisclosed |
| 27 May 2010 | (Portugal) Nuno Santos | (Portugal) Vitória de Setúbal | (Portugal) Portimonense | Undisclosed |
| 28 May 2010 | (Cape Verde) Vandi | (Portugal) Grupo Desportivo de Lagoa | (Portugal) Portimonense | Undisclosed |
| 29 May 2010 | (Portugal) Miguel Rosa | (Portugal) Benfica | (Portugal) Vitória de Setúbal | Loan |
| 30 May 2010 | (Croatia) Danijel Stojanović | (Bosnia and Herzegovina) HŠK Zrinjski Mostar | (Portugal) Nacional | Undisclosed |
| 30 May 2010 | (Portugal) Ricardo Esteves | (South Korea) FC Seoul | (Portugal) Marítimo | Undisclosed |
| 31 May 2010 | (Senegal) Ladji Keita | (Portugal) Vitória de Setúbal | (Portugal) Braga | Undisclosed |
| 31 May 2010 | (Nigeria) Uwa Echiéjilé | (France) Stade Rennais | (Portugal) Braga | Free |
| 31 May 2010 | (Portugal) João Paulo | (Portugal) Leixões | (Cyprus) Olympiakos Nicosia | Undisclosed |
| 31 May 2010 | (Portugal) Rui Rego | (Portugal) Chaves | (Portugal) Beira-Mar | Free |
| 1 June 2010 | (Brazil) Ronny | (Portugal) Sporting CP | (Germany) Hertha BSC | Free |
| 2 June 2010 | (France) Romain Salin | (France) Tours | (Portugal) Naval 1º de Maio | Undisclosed |
| 2 June 2010 | (Portugal) Cris | (Portugal) Académica de Coimbra | (Greece) Asteras Tripolis | Free |
| 2 June 2010 | (Portugal) João Pedro | (Cyprus) Ethnikos Achna | (Portugal) Gil Vicente | Undisclosed |
| 3 June 2010 | (Brazil) Nildo Petrolina | (Brazil) Salgueiro | (Portugal) Trofense | Undisclosed |
| 3 June 2010 | (Brazil) Moreilândia | (Brazil) Salgueiro | (Portugal) Trofense | Undisclosed |
| 3 June 2010 | (Brazil) Vítor Caicó | (Brazil) Salgueiro | (Portugal) Trofense | Undisclosed |
| 4 June 2010 | (Brazil) Edgar | (Brazil) Vasco da Gama | (Portugal) Vitória de Guimarães | Undisclosed |
| 4 June 2010 | (Brazil) Anderson Santana | (Russia) Terek Grozny | (Portugal) Vitória de Guimarães | Undisclosed |
| 8 June 2010 | (Portugal) Sereno | (Spain) Valladolid | (Portugal) Porto | Free |
| 9 June 2010 | (Brazil) Bruno Lazaroni | (Portugal) Naval 1º de Maio | (Saudi Arabia) Al-Ettifaq | Undisclosed |
| 9 June 2010 | (Brazil) André Leone | (Portugal) Braga | (Brazil) Sport | Free |
| 9 June 2010 | (Brazil) Renato Saldanha | (Brazil) Toledo Colônia Work | (Portugal) União de Leiria | Undisclosed |
| 9 June 2010 | (Senegal) Pape Sow | (Portugal) União de Leiria | (Portugal) Académica de Coimbra | Free |
| 9 June 2010 | (Portugal) Manú | (Portugal) Marítimo | (Poland) Legia Warszawa | Undisclosed |
| 10 June 2010 | (Brazil) Eduardo | (Brazil) Botafogo | (Portugal) Braga | Undisclosed |
| 10 June 2010 | (Brazil) Leandro Salino | (Portugal) Nacional | (Portugal) Braga | Undisclosed |
| 10 June 2010 | (Brazil) Tales Júnior | (Portugal) Feirense | (Portugal) Leixões | Undisclosed |
| 11 June 2010 | (Ghana) William Tiero | (Portugal) Académica de Coimbra | (Bulgaria) CSKA Sofia | Undisclosed |
| 11 June 2010 | (Brazil) Bruno Ferraz | (Brazil) Porto Alegre | (Portugal) União de Leiria | Undisclosed |
| 11 June 2010 | (Angola) Carlos | (Portugal) Rio Ave | (Turkey) Bucaspor | Undisclosed |
| 11 June 2010 | (Brazil) Getúlio Vargas | (Brazil) Duque de Caxias | (Portugal) Vitória de Setúbal | Undisclosed |
| 11 June 2010 | (Brazil) William | (Russia) Anzhi | (Portugal) Vitória de Guimarães | Undisclosed |
| 11 June 2010 | (Burkina Faso) Aziz Nikiema | (China) Qingdao Jonoon | (Portugal) Trofense | Undisclosed |
| 12 June 2010 | (Brazil) Léo Fortunato | (Brazil) Cruzeiro | (Portugal) Braga | Loan |
| 12 June 2010 | (Brazil) Orestes | (Germany) Hansa Rostock | (Portugal) Naval 1º de Maio | Undisclosed |
| 12 June 2010 | (Brazil) Rogério | (Brazil) Vila Nova | (Portugal) Naval 1º de Maio | Undisclosed |
| 12 June 2010 | (Brazil) Jonathas | (Brazil) Pelotas | (Portugal) Naval 1º de Maio | Undisclosed |
| 22 June 2010 | (Argentina) Marco Torsiglieri | (Argentina) Vélez Sársfield | (Portugal) Sporting | €3,400,000 |
| 4 July 2010 | (Portugal) João Moutinho | (Portugal) Sporting CP | (Portugal) FC Porto | €11,000,000 |
| 6 July 2010 | (Colombia) James Rodríguez | (Argentina) Banfield | (Portugal) FC Porto | €5,100,000 |
| 6 July 2010 | (Chile) Jaime Valdés | (Italy) Atalanta | (Portugal) Sporting | €2,200,000 |
| 23 July 2010 | (Portugal) Vítor Castanheira | (Portugal) Chaves | (Portugal) Moreirense | Free |
| 4 August 2010 | (Portugal) Miguel Veloso | (Portugal) Sporting CP | (Italy) Genoa CFC | €9,000,000 |

- ^1 Player who signs with club before 1 July officially joins his new club on 1 July 2010, while player who joined after 1 July joined his new club following his signature of the contract.
