= Anilton =

Anilton may refer to:

- Anílton da Conceição (born 1968), Brazilian footballer
- Anilton (footballer) (born 1980), Brazilian footballer
