= César Peixoto =

Portuguese footballer and manager (born 1980)

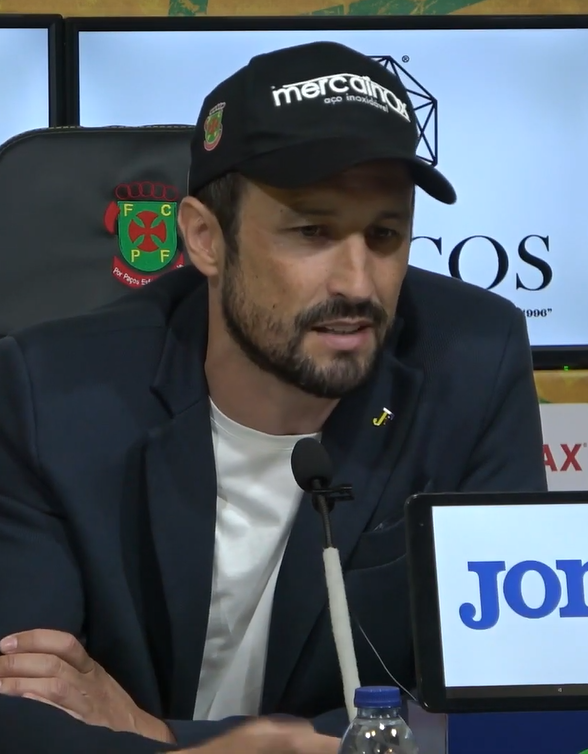
- Peixoto in 2023

Personal information
- Full name: Paulo César Silva Peixoto
- Date of birth: 12 May 1980 (age 46)
- Place of birth: Guimarães, Portugal
- Height: 1.82 m (6 ft 0 in)
- Position: Midfielder

Team information
- Current team: Wolverhampton Wanderers (manager)

Youth career
- 1991–1999: Vitória Guimarães
- 1995–1996: → Ribeira de Pena (loan)
- 1996–1998: → Brito (loan)

Senior career*
Years	Team	Apps	(Gls)
1999–2001	Caçadores Taipas	18	(2)
2001–2002	Belenenses	22	(7)
2002–2007	Porto	41	(9)
2005	→ Vitória Guimarães (loan)	13	(1)
2006–2007	→ Espanyol (loan)	0	(0)
2007–2009	Braga	44	(4)
2009–2012	Benfica	31	(0)
2012–2014	Gil Vicente	54	(4)
Total		223	(27)

International career
2002	Portugal U21	3	(0)
2008	Portugal	1	(0)

Managerial career
- 2019: Varzim
- 2019: Académica
- 2019–2020: Chaves
- 2020–2021: Moreirense
- 2021–2022: Paços Ferreira
- 2023: Paços Ferreira
- 2024–2025: Moreirense
- 2025–2026: Gil Vicente
- 2026–: Wolverhampton Wanderers
- * Club domestic league appearances and goals

Paulo César Silva Peixoto (born 12 May 1980) is a Portuguese professional football manager and former player who played mainly as a left midfielder and occasionally as a left-back. He is the head coach of EFL Championship club Wolverhampton Wanderers.

He amassed Primeira Liga totals of 205 matches and 25 goals over 13 seasons, representing in the competition Belenenses, Porto, Vitória de Guimarães, Braga, Benfica and Gil Vicente. He played once for Portugal.

Peixoto started working as a manager in 2019, leading Moreirense, Paços de Ferreira (two spells at both) and Gil Vicente in the top flight.

== Club career ==
=== Belenenses ===
After spending his first two professional seasons at lowly Caçadores das Taipas, near Guimarães where he was born, Peixoto's ability as a left winger allowed him to jump from the fourth division straight into the Primeira Liga with Belenenses, thanks to former player João Cardoso.

He scored seven goals in his first year, one of them a long range shot closing a 3–0 win against Porto at the Estádio do Restelo. In July 2002, he signed with Porto, going on to be managed by José Mourinho.

=== Porto ===
Peixoto's Porto career did not go as planned; while talented, he failed to impose in the first team, and in his first season only made 15 appearances, scoring three goals. He was starting to make his presence felt in the starting XI when, after netting in two consecutive league matches in 4–1 wins, he was seriously injured in the UEFA Champions League 3–2 away victory over Marseille on 22 October 2003 and, while it did not seem serious at first, on the next day a ruptured anterior cruciate ligament was diagnosed, which forced him to miss most of the campaign.

After his recovery, Peixoto crashed his Mercedes-Benz SL500 while speeding to arrive in time at Porto's training center in Vila Nova de Gaia, and while only getting minor bruises, the car was completely wrecked and he was promptly asked for explanations by Mourinho. His image as a professional suffered much from the accident, and midway through the following campaign he was loaned to Vitória de Guimarães where he regained his previous form, returning to Porto for 2005–06.

Facing another loan, Peixoto remained in the transfer list until the eleventh hour, being one of the final players to get a sit in the team. Following the internal problems with Nuno Valente and the subpar performances of Leandro, coach Co Adriaanse turned him into a prolific left-back in the same fashion of Portuguese internationals Miguel or Paulo Ferreira (who played right midfielder during most of his under-21 career).

After having scored twice at Naval 1º de Maio in a 3–2 win – he also put one in his own net– Peixoto again suffered a major knee injury that would keep him away from the pitch for the rest of the season, eliminating any hope of World Cup selection. He would be dismissed by Adriaanse and joined La Liga side Espanyol on loan for 2006–07, finally cutting all ties with Porto in March 2007; previously, on 27 February, Espanyol had also terminated his contract as the player failed to make any competitive appearances for the Catalans.

=== Braga and Benfica ===
Peixoto signed a three-year contract with Braga on 29 May 2007. He declared himself delighted to join "...the fourth biggest team in Portugal."

After two intermittent seasons, Peixoto refused to take part in Braga's 2009–10 UEFA Europa League fixtures against IF Elfsborg amidst reported interest from Benfica, thus being suspended. On 7 August 2009, a transfer deal between the two clubs was arranged for a fee of €400,000 – Braga retained 50% of his rights. He spent most of his first season as left-back, battling for position with another adapted player, Fábio Coentrão.

After appearing in 65 official games for Benfica (one goal, in a 6–0 away win over Monsanto in the 2009–10 edition of the Taça de Portugal), Peixoto was deemed surplus to requirements by manager Jorge Jesus as practically all Portuguese players, and was not given a jersey for the 2011–12 campaign, being ultimately released from contract on 6 January 2012.

=== Gil Vicente ===
On 31 January 2012, Peixoto signed for Gil Vicente for the rest of the season. In the second leg of the semi-finals of the Taça da Liga on 22 March, he assisted the opening goal by Hugo Vieira in a 2–2 draw against Braga before a win on penalties; he also took part in the final, a 2–1 loss to fellow former employers Benfica.

Peixoto signed a new three-year deal on 17 July 2012. He scored his first goal for the club from Barcelos the following 28 April, a Panenka penalty kick to conclude a 2–0 win at home to relegation rivals Olhanense.

On 7 November 2014, Peixoto was suspended. He was dismissed on 26 December with what Gil Vicente deemed just cause, for missing a planned visit to a school.

== International career ==
Aged 28, Peixoto earned his only cap for Portugal, appearing as an 84th-minute substitute for Maniche in a 6–2 friendly loss to Brazil on 19 November 2008. He was called up by Carlos Queiroz for the final games of 2010 FIFA World Cup qualification, but did not play.

== Coaching career ==
Peixoto started working as a manager on 11 March 2019, being appointed at LigaPro side Varzim. On 19 June that year, after succeeding in avoiding relegation, he moved to Académica de Coimbra in the same league. He left his post five months later, having collected only nine points in ten matches.

On 19 December 2019, Peixoto signed with Chaves, succeeding José Mota at the team eighth in the second division. He had his first experience in the top tier in November of the following year, when he replaced the departed Ricardo Soares at Moreirense on a short-term contract. Having won one of five league fixtures, he resigned on 2 January 2021.

Peixoto took over from Jorge Simão at Paços de Ferreira on 16 December 2021; arriving with the team in 13th, he finished the season two places higher. He opened the following campaign with no wins and two points from nine games, and after a 2–0 loss to Liga 3 side Vitória de Setúbal in the third round of the cup on 16 October 2022 he was dismissed. He returned to the same job at the turn of the year, after his replacement Mota had resigned with no points from four fixtures. Paços were eventually relegated as second-bottom, and he chose not to renew his contract.

On 3 June 2024, Peixoto returned to Moreirense; he replaced Rui Borges, who had led the club to a best-ever 55 points in the main division. On 24 February 2025, after only one victory from the last 12 matches, he was fired.

Peixoto returned to Gil Vicente on 2 March 2025, being appointed head coach on a four-month deal that would be automatically renewed in case of top-division survival. In November, he agreed to another extension at the Estádio Cidade de Barcelos.

On 15 June 2026, Peixoto signed a two-year contract as manager of EFL Championship side Wolverhampton Wanderers. On his debut on 7 August, he oversaw a 3–0 victory over Port Vale in the first round of the EFL Cup.

== Personal life ==
From 2005 to 2007, Peixoto was married to actress and Rádio e Televisão de Portugal presenter Isabel Figueira. The couple had one child, a son.

On 3 January 2022, Peixoto tested positive for COVID-19.

== Managerial statistics ==
As of match played 21 November 2026

Managerial record by team and tenure
Team	Nat	From	To	Record							
Team	Nat	From	To	G	W	D	L	GF	GA	GD	Win %
Varzim	(Portugal)	11 March 2019	19 June 2019	9	4	2	3	6	8	−2	44.44
Académica	(Portugal)	19 June 2019	16 November 2019	14	4	4	6	13	16	−3	28.57
Chaves	(Portugal)	19 December 2019	30 June 2020	12	3	4	5	11	13	−2	25.00
Moreirense	(Portugal)	10 November 2020	2 January 2021	7	3	2	2	7	6	+1	42.86
Paços Ferreira	(Portugal)	16 December 2021	16 October 2022	30	7	8	15	25	44	−19	23.33
Paços Ferreira	(Portugal)	2 January 2023	30 May 2023	20	6	3	11	19	33	−14	30.00
Moreirense	(Portugal)	1 July 2024	24 February 2025	26	8	5	13	31	40	−9	30.77
Gil Vicente	(Portugal)	2 March 2025	15 June 2026	46	16	14	16	59	52	+7	34.78
Wolverhampton Wanderers	(England)	15 June 2026	present	19	11	4	4	33	20	+13	57.89
Total				183	62	46	75	204	232	−28	33.88

== Honours ==
=== Player ===
Porto

- Primeira Liga: 2002–03, 2003–04, 2005–06
- Taça de Portugal: 2002–03
- Supertaça Cândido de Oliveira: 2003, 2004
- UEFA Champions League: 2003–04
- UEFA Cup: 2002–03

Benfica

- Primeira Liga: 2009–10
- Taça da Liga: 2009–10, 2010–11
- Supertaça Cândido de Oliveira runner-up: 2010

Gil Vicente

- Taça da Liga runner-up: 2011–12

=== Manager ===
Individual

- Primeira Liga Manager of the Month: September/October 2025
