= Vítor Murta (footballer) =

Portuguese footballer (born 1979)

Personal information
- Full name: Vítor Manuel Fernandes Murta
- Date of birth: 21 July 1979 (age 47)
- Place of birth: Vila Real, Portugal
- Height: 1.84 m (6 ft 0 in)
- Position: Goalkeeper

Youth career
- 1992–1997: Mateus
- 1997–1998: Vila Real

Senior career*
Years	Team	Apps	(Gls)
1998–2003	Vila Real	70	(0)
2003–2005	Freamunde	51	(0)
2005–2008	Gondomar	57	(0)
2008–2010	Vizela	27	(0)
2010–2013	Gil Vicente	19	(0)
2013–2014	AD Oliveirense	29	(0)
2014–2016	Famalicão	42	(0)
2016–2017	Trofense	13	(0)
2017	AD Oliveirense	7	(0)
2017–2018	Mondinense	21	(0)
2018–2019	Vila Real	3	(0)
Total		339	(0)
- * Club domestic league appearances and goals

Vítor Manuel Fernandes Murta (born 21 July 1979) is a Portuguese former professional footballer who played as a goalkeeper.

== Football career ==
Born in Vila Real, Murta began his career in the third tier with hometown club S.C. Vila Real and S.C. Freamunde, before stepping up to the second with Gondomar S.C. in 2005. He remained at that level in 2008, when he joined F.C. Vizela.

In 2010, Murta signed for Gil Vicente FC, who ended the season as champions of the second division; he played just 11 games of 30 but was only used one fewer time than first-choice Jorge Baptista. He made his Primeira Liga debut at age 32 on 18 February 2012, as a half-time substitute for Adriano Facchini in a 3–0 home loss to S.C. Braga. He played seven more times for the club from Barcelos the following season, and was sent off in the last game on 19 May 2013 in a 3–1 home loss to G.D. Estoril-Praia for conceding a penalty.

After a year at A.D. Oliveirense, Murta moved across the third tier to F.C. Famalicão in 2014. His first season at the club ended in promotion, despite a penalty shootout defeat to C.D. Mafra in the final on 10 June 2015.

From 2016, Murta returned to the third tier with C.D. Trofense, Oliveirense again, and Mondinense FC.
