= Rui Faria (footballer, born 1992) =

Portuguese footballer

Personal information
- Full name: Rui Filipe Pereira Faria
- Date of birth: 30 May 1992 (age 34)
- Place of birth: Barcelos, Portugal
- Height: 1.88 m (6 ft 2 in)
- Position: Midfielder

Team information
- Current team: Sanjoanense
- Number: 5

Youth career
- 2003–2004: Santa Maria
- 2004–2011: Gil Vicente

Senior career*
Years	Team	Apps	(Gls)
2011–2013	Gil Vicente	0	(0)
2012	→ Vilaverdense (loan)	6	(0)
2013	→ Mirandela (loan)	11	(0)
2013–2015	Vianense	16	(1)
2015–2016	Trofense	21	(1)
2016–2017	Salgueiros	22	(2)
2017–2019	Gil Vicente	32	(2)
2019–2020	Trofense	11	(0)
2020	Sanjoanense	1	(0)
2020–	Vilaverdense	11	(2)
- * Club domestic league appearances and goals as of 17:46, 26 January 2021 (UTC)

Rui Filipe Pereira Faria (born 30 May 1992) is a Portuguese footballer who plays for Länk FC Vilaverdense, as a midfielder.

== Career ==
On 23 July 2017, Faria made his professional debut with Gil Vicente in a 2017–18 Taça da Liga match against Varzim.
