= Nuno Santos (footballer, born 1978) =

Portuguese footballer

Personal information
- Full name: Nuno Filipe Oliveira Santos
- Date of birth: 9 July 1978 (age 48)
- Place of birth: Coimbra, Portugal
- Height: 1.82 m (6 ft 0 in)
- Position: Goalkeeper

Youth career
- 1989–1991: União Coimbra
- 1991–1997: Sporting CP

Senior career*
Years	Team	Apps	(Gls)
1997–2005	Sporting CP	1	(0)
1997–2000	→ Lourinhanense (loan)	53	(0)
2000–2003	Sporting CP B	31	(0)
2001–2002	→ Estrela Amadora (loan)	24	(0)
2003–2005	→ Penafiel (loan)	59	(0)
2005–2006	Penafiel	21	(0)
2006–2009	Vitória Guimarães	7	(0)
2009–2010	Vitória Setúbal	15	(0)
2010	Portimonense	0	(0)
2010–2011	Gil Vicente	8	(0)
2011–2012	Covilhã	21	(0)
2012–2014	Penafiel	2	(0)
2014–2015	Ribeirão	16	(0)
Total		258	(0)

International career
1997–1998	Portugal U20	12	(0)
1998–1999	Portugal U21	16	(0)

Managerial career
- 2017–2019: Gil Vicente (under-19)
- 2020–2022: Vitória Guimarães B (assistant)
- 2022–2023: Vitória Guimarães (assistant)
- 2023–2024: Chaves (assistant)
- * Club domestic league appearances and goals

Nuno Filipe Oliveira Santos (born 9 July 1978) is a Portuguese former professional footballer who played as a goalkeeper.

== Playing career ==
Born in Coimbra, Baixo Mondego, Santos started his professional career with Sporting CP. Barred by the likes of Peter Schmeichel and Ricardo during his spell he only appeared once for the first team in the Primeira Liga, and was loaned to several clubs during his contract, including F.C. Penafiel in the Segunda Liga in the 2003–04 season.

After helping the northern side to return to the top flight, Santos had his loan extended until 30 June 2005. At the end of the campaign, which ended with an 11th position and the subsequent league status preservation, he agreed to a permanent deal.

Subsequently, Santos joined Vitória de Guimarães, battling for second-choice duties with Serginho as Brazilian Nilson was the undisputed starter. In 2009–10 he left for Vitória de Setúbal on a free transfer, and featured in 15 matches during the season – the other goalkeeper, Mário Felgueiras, played 14 – as the Sadinos barely avoided top-tier relegation.

In summer 2010, Santos initially signed with Portimonense S.C. for one year. However, shortly after, the deal fell through and the player joined Gil Vicente F.C. of division two, also in a one-year contract. He played the first game of the campaign, a 2–1 home win against C.D. Trofense, but was replaced by Vítor Murta in the tenth minute after suffering an injury.

== Coaching career ==
After retiring in early 2015 at the age of 36, Santos joined his last club G.D. Ribeirão's staff as a goalkeeper coach. In the same capacity, he later worked with Gil Vicente's youths and Leixões SC.

Santos returned to Gil Vicente and their under-19 team ahead of 2017–18, but now as manager. He left in November 2019, accepting a goalkeeping coach position at Saudi Arabian club Al-Fayha FC where his compatriot Jorge Simão was the manager.

Subsequently, Santos was part of Moreno's staff at Vitória de Guimarães (both first and second teams) and G.D. Chaves.

== Honours ==
Sporting CP

- Supertaça Cândido de Oliveira: 2002

Gil Vicente

- Segunda Liga: 2010–11

Individual

- Toulon Tournament Best Goalkeeper: 1997, 1998
