= Anderson Luís (footballer, born 1988) =

Brazilian footballer

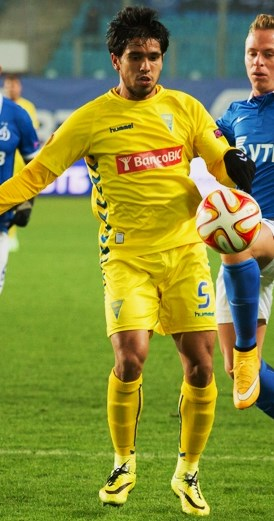

Personal information
- Full name: Anderson Luís Ribeiro Pereira
- Date of birth: July 31, 1988 (age 38)
- Place of birth: Mesópolis, Brazil
- Height: 1.75 m (5 ft 9 in)
- Position: Right-back

Youth career
- 2002–2006: Figueirense

Senior career*
Years	Team	Apps	(Gls)
2007–2011	Figueirense	39	(0)
2009	→ Guaratinguetá (loan)	8	(0)
2010	→ Mirassol (loan)	14	(0)
2010–2011	→ Estoril (loan)	28	(0)
2011–2016	Estoril	110	(2)
2016–2017	Arouca	31	(0)
2017–2018	Vila Nova	16	(0)
2018–2019	São Caetano	2	(0)
2020	Penapolense	8	(0)
2020–2021	Operário-MS	14	(0)
- * Club domestic league appearances and goals as of 19:45, 1 June 2022 (UTC)

Anderson Luís Ribeiro Pereira or simply Anderson Luís (born July 31, 1988), is a Brazilian footballer who plays as a right-back.
