= Roberto (footballer, born 1978) =

Brazilian footballer and manager

Personal information
- Full name: Roberto Calmon Félix
- Date of birth: 29 July 1978 (age 48)
- Place of birth: Linhares, Brazil
- Height: 1.88 m (6 ft 2 in)
- Position: Striker

Youth career
- 1996: Linhares
- 1997: São Paulo
- 1997: Portuguesa

Senior career*
Years	Team	Apps	(Gls)
1998	Portuguesa	0	(0)
1999	Bragantino		
1999–2000	Maia	28	(6)
2000	Bragantino	0	(0)
2001	Portuguesa	1	(0)
2001–2002	Moreirense	30	(11)
2002–2003	Académica	13	(0)
2003–2004	Estrela Amadora	4	(0)
2004–2006	Chaves	45	(10)
2006	Marco	8	(4)
2007–2008	Varzim	30	(11)
2008–2010	Vitória Guimarães	66	(14)
2010–2011	Asteras Tripolis	9	(1)
2011	Beijing Guoan	7	(3)
2011–2012	Gil Vicente	12	(1)
2014	Linhares		
Total		253	(61)

Managerial career
- 2014: Linhares
- 2016: Linhares
- * Club domestic league appearances and goals

Roberto Calmon Félix (born 29 July 1978), known simply as Roberto, is a Brazilian former footballer who played as a striker.

He spent the vast majority of his professional career in Portugal, mainly with Vitória de Guimarães where he arrived at the age of 30. He amassed Primeira Liga totals of 95 games and 15 goals over the course of six seasons, adding 133 matches and 38 goals in the Segunda Liga.

== Playing career ==
Roberto was born in Linhares, Espírito Santo. He played almost exclusively in Portugal during his career, spending most of his early years in the second division, representing F.C. Maia, Moreirense F.C. and Académica de Coimbra, where he first arrived in the Primeira Liga.

After another slow year, with C.F. Estrela da Amadora, Roberto returned to the second level with G.D. Chaves, F.C. Marco and Varzim SC. In January 2008, after solid performances for the latter, he signed a 2 1/2-year contract with top-flight club Vitória SC, being a relatively important attacking unit – 14 matches, two goals – as they finished third only one year after promoting.

After two more seasons in the top tier with Vitória being used regularly (and averaging six league goals in the process), the 32-year-old Roberto joined Asteras Tripolis F.C. in Greece, signing for one year. In March 2011, however, he moved teams and countries again, transferring to Chinese Super League side Beijing Guoan FC.

== Coaching career ==
After retiring in 2014 at his first club Linhares Futebol Clube, Roberto started his managerial career precisely there. After leading them to the Campeonato Capixaba vice-championship, he returned on 6 January 2016.
