= Laionel =

Brazilian footballer

Personal information
- Full name: Laionel Silva Ramalho
- Date of birth: 27 April 1986 (age 40)
- Place of birth: Campos Belos, Brazil
- Height: 1.73 m (5 ft 8 in)
- Position: Forward

Team information
- Current team: Portuguesa Santista

Senior career*
Years	Team	Apps	(Gls)
2006–2007	Vila Nova	5	(0)
2007–2011	Grêmio Inhumense		
2007–2008	→ Boavista (loan)	19	(3)
2008–2010	→ Vitória Setúbal (loan)	25	(2)
2009–2010	→ Salamanca (loan)	18	(0)
2010–2011	→ Académica (loan)	26	(5)
2011–2012	Gil Vicente	14	(2)
2012	Astra Ploiești	10	(1)
2012	Remo	5	(0)
2013	Gama		
2013	Rio Verde	4	(2)
2013	Guarani	13	(4)
2014	Volta Redonda	15	(0)
2014	CEOV	6	(0)
2015	Grêmio Anápolis	4	(0)
2015	Palmas	3	(0)
2016	CEOV	2	(0)
2016	Luziânia	4	(1)
2017	Cascavel	9	(0)
2017	Villa Nova	5	(0)
2018	Anápolis	13	(1)
2018–	Portuguesa Santista	9	(0)
- * Club domestic league appearances and goals as of 24 February 2019

Laionel Silva Ramalho (born 27 April 1986), known simply as Laionel, is a Brazilian footballer who plays for Associação Atlética Portuguesa (Santos) as a forward.

== Club career ==
Born in Campos Belos, Goiás, Laionel started playing football with two local clubs, lowly Vila Nova Futebol Clube and Grêmio Esportivo Inhumense. In the middle of 2007, he moved to Portugal with Boavista FC.

After Boavista's demotion due to irregularities, Laionel stayed in the country, signing with another modest side in the Primeira Liga, Vitória de Setúbal, for the 2008–09 campaign. Again, he struggled to find the net even though he received a fair amount of playing time, but his team avoided a drop this time.

Laionel was loaned to Spain's UD Salamanca in summer 2009, with the Segunda División club retaining a €175.000 buying option at the season's close. As the Castile and León team barely avoided relegation he did not manage to score in the league, appearing in less than half of the matches.

In early July 2010, Laionel returned to Portugal, being loaned to Académica de Coimbra from Grémio Anápolis (formerly Inhumense), in a season-long move. On 15 August he scored his first official goal in more than one year, netting from 35 metres in the 93rd minute to help shock-defeat title holders S.L. Benfica 2–1 away from home.

On 11 July 2011, Laionel moved to freshly promoted club Gil Vicente F.C. after his contract with Grêmio expired. On 12 August, in the campaign opener, again he stripped Benfica of points, scoring once to help the Barcelos team come from behind 0–2 to earn a point at home; in late January 2012, however, he signed for FC Astra Ploiești in Romania.
