= Filipe Fernandes =

Portuguese footballer

Personal information
- Full name: Filipe Miguel Lopes Fernandes
- Date of birth: 5 March 1980 (age 46)
- Place of birth: Castelo Branco, Portugal
- Height: 1.82 m (6 ft 0 in)
- Position: Midfielder

Team information
- Current team: Águias do Moradal

Youth career
- 1996–1997: Benfica e Castelo Branco

Senior career*
Years	Team	Apps	(Gls)
1997–2001	Benfica e Castelo Branco		
2001–2002	Campomaiorense	6	(0)
2002–2003	Benfica e Castelo Branco	2	(0)
2003–2006	Marco	64	(0)
2007–2009	Gil Vicente	51	(1)
2009–2010	AEK Larnaca	29	(2)
2010–2011	Gil Vicente	8	(0)
2011–2012	Sporting Covilhã	24	(1)
2013–2017	Benfica e Castelo Branco	22	(1)
2017–	Águias do Moradal	34	(0)
- * Club domestic league appearances and goals as of 20 January 2019

Filipe Miguel Lopes Fernandes (born 5 March 1980) is a Portuguese footballer who plays for Águias do Moradal as a midfielder.

== Career ==
Fernandes made his professional debut in the Segunda Liga for Campomaiorense on 28 October 2001 in a game against Penafiel.
