= Halisson =

Brazilian footballer (born 1985)

Personal information
- Full name: Halisson Bruno Melo dos Santos
- Date of birth: 28 June 1985 (age 41)
- Place of birth: Bauru, Brazil
- Height: 1.89 m (6 ft 2 in)
- Position: Centre back

Youth career
- 2003–2004: Santos

Senior career*
Years	Team	Apps	(Gls)
2005	Santos	29	(3)
2006	Ipatinga		
2007–2008	Portuguesa	37	(2)
2009	Mogi Mirim	5	(2)
2010	Santo André	26	(0)
2011–2014	Noroeste	13	(0)
2011	→ Târgu Mureş (loan)	2	(0)
2011–2014	→ Gil Vicente (loan)	69	(1)
2014	Oeste	17	(1)
2015	Botafogo-SP	15	(1)
2015	Oeste	20	(0)
2016	São Bento	1	(0)
2016	Paykan	3	(0)
2017	Vila Nova	2	(0)
2017	São Bento	8	(0)
2018	Santo André	1	(0)
2019	Tupynambás	5	(0)
- * Club domestic league appearances and goals as of 15:56, 3 March 2021 (UTC)

Halisson Bruno Melo dos Santos (born 28 June 1985), simply known as Halisson, is a Brazilian footballer who plays as a central defender.
