= João Pedro (footballer, born 1980) =

Portuguese footballer

Personal information
- Full name: João Pedro Lima Santos
- Date of birth: 15 August 1980 (age 46)
- Place of birth: Famalicão, Portugal
- Height: 1.74 m (5 ft 9 in)
- Position: Left back

Youth career
- 1993–1994: Famalicão
- 1994–1999: Porto

Senior career*
| Years | Team | Apps | (Gls) |
| 1999–2000 | Leça | 9 | (0) |
| 2000–2001 | Trofense | 36 | (1) |
| 2001–2002 | Famalicão | 29 | (0) |
| 2002–2005 | Estoril | 100 | (3) |
| 2005–2009 | Gil Vicente | 108 | (6) |
| 2009–2010 | Ethnikos Achna | 12 | (0) |
| 2010–2013 | Gil Vicente | 8 | (0) |
| 2013–2014 | Penafiel | 34 | (2) |
| 2014–2015 | Famalicão | 21 | (0) |
| 2015–2016 | Trofense | 14 | (0) |

International career
| 1996 | Portugal U16 | 1 | (0) |
| 1998–1999 | Portugal U18 | 8 | (2) |
- * Club domestic league appearances and goals as of 15 May 2016

João Pedro Lima Santos (born 15 August 1980), known as João Pedro, is a Portuguese footballer who plays as a left back.

He played 155 matches in the Segunda Liga during seven seasons, scoring a combined eight goals for Leça, Estoril, Gil Vicente and Penafiel. He added 67 appearances in the Primeira Liga, in a 17-year senior career.

== Club career ==
Born in Vila Nova de Famalicão, Braga District, João Pedro spent the better part of his youth career with FC Porto. His senior debut occurred in the second division, with Leça FC.

In the following years, João Pedro alternated between the second and the third levels. From 2002 to 2004 he achieved consecutive promotions with G.D. Estoril Praia, contributing with 69 games and three goals in the process; he played his first match in the Primeira Liga also with that team, in a 0–0 home draw against Rio Ave F.C. on 29 August 2004 where he featured the full 90 minutes.

For 2005–06, following his team's relegation, João Pedro signed with Gil Vicente F.C. also in the top tier. He scored once from 28 appearances during the season, again dropping down a level but now due to irregularities.

After one year in the Cypriot First Division with Ethnikos Achna FC, João Pedro returned to Barcelos, again promoting to the top flight in 2011 but failing to play in a single league match during the campaign due to a knee injury. The 33-year-old returned to the second division on 17 June 2013, joining F.C. Penafiel on a one-year contract.

Subsequently, João Pedro competed in the lower leagues with former clubs F.C. Famalicão and C.D. Trofense.

== Honours ==
Estoril

- Segunda Liga: 2003–04
- Portuguese Second Division: 2002–03
