= Éder Sciola =

Brazilian footballer

Personal information
- Full name: Éder Sciola Santana
- Date of birth: 22 September 1985 (age 41)
- Place of birth: São Paulo, Brazil
- Height: 1.81 m (5 ft 11 in)
- Positions: Right-back; right midfielder

Youth career
- Grêmio Barueri

Senior career*
Years	Team	Apps	(Gls)
2003–2004	Grêmio Barueri		
2005	Fluminense		
2005	Inter de Limeira		
2006–2010	Noroeste	18	(0)
2008	→ São Paulo (loan)	15	(0)
2010–2011	Grêmio Barueri	21	(0)
2010	→ Atlético Paranaense (loan)	0	(0)
2011	→ Guaratinguetá (loan)	8	(0)
2011	Ituano	11	(2)
2011–2014	Gil Vicente	37	(0)
2014	Cuiabá	19	(3)
2015	XV de Piracicaba	12	(0)
2015	Atlético Goianiense	34	(0)
2016	Novorizontino	11	(0)
2016	Sampaio Corrêa	32	(0)
2017–2018	Brasil de Pelotas	83	(8)
2019	Paraná	46	(1)
2020–2021	Oeste	34	(3)
2021	Guarani	8	(0)
2022	São Bento	4	(0)
- * Club domestic league appearances and goals

Éder Sciola Santana (22 September 1985) is a Brazilian former professional footballer who played as a right-back and right midfielder.

== Career ==
Started playing as a right back for Grêmio Barueri in 2003. In 2005 he was negotiated with Fluminense, where failed to establish himself in the team. He also passed through Inter de Limeira and Noroeste of Bauru after that.

In February 2008, he was loaned to São Paulo until the end of the year. His contract was terminated on 29 September after he tried to enter the club's accommodation with call girls. Even so, he is considered by the club as the Brazilian champion of that year.

After going through other teams without success, in 2011, moved to Ituano to compete in the Campeonato Paulista. He drew the attention of Gil Vicente, from Portugal, where he made 37 appearances. The club where he stood out the most was in Brasil de Pelotas, on the Campeonato Brasileiro Série B. His last clubs were Guarani and São Bento.

== Honours ==
São Paulo

- Campeonato Brasileiro: 2008
