= Luís Manuel (footballer, born 1981) =

Portuguese footballer

Personal information
- Full name: Luís Manuel Mendes Pereira
- Date of birth: 25 June 1981 (age 45)
- Place of birth: Braga, Portugal
- Height: 1.82 m (5 ft 11 1/2 in)
- Position: Midfielder

Youth career
- 1993–2000: Braga

Senior career*
| Years | Team | Apps | (Gls) |
| 2000−2002 | Braga B | 53 | (1) |
| 2002−2003 | Joane | | |
| 2003−2004 | Dragões Sandinenses | 16 | (1) |
| 2004−2005 | Leixões | 28 | (1) |
| 2005−2006 | Nacional | 1 | (0) |
| 2006−2007 | Vizela | 19 | (2) |
| 2007−2008 | Gil Vicente | 20 | (0) |
| 2008−2009 | União Leiria | 18 | (0) |
| 2009−2010 | Lousada | 25 | (0) |
| 2010−2013 | Gil Vicente | 77 | (0) |
| 2013−2015 | Aves | 66 | (2) |
| 2015−2016 | Vilaverdense | 21 | (0) |
| 2016–2017 | Brito | 6 | (0) |
- * Club domestic league appearances and goals

Luís Manuel Mendes Pereira (born 25 June 1981), known as Luís Manuel, is a Portuguese retired footballer who played as a midfielder.

== Club career ==
Born in Braga, Luís Manuel spent seven years in local S.C. Braga's youth system. He only appeared for the reserve side as a senior, however.

After a one-year spell with GD Joane in the fourth division, and another with Sport Clube Dragões Sandinenses in the third, Luís Manuel signed with Leixões S.C. in 2004, making his professional debut on 29 August of that year in a Segunda Liga match against S.C. Espinho (90 minutes played, 3–2 away win). Subsequently, he moved to the Primeira Liga with C.D. Nacional, but left at the end of the 2005–06 season with only two competitive appearances to his credit.

In the following years, Luís Manuel competed in all three major levels of Portuguese football, with F.C. Vizela, Gil Vicente FC (two spells, two consecutive campaigns in the top flight from 2011 to 2013), U.D. Leiria, A.D. Lousada and C.D. Aves.
