= Anilton (footballer) =

Brazilian footballer (born 1980)

Personal information
- Full name: José Anilton Júnior
- Date of birth: July 10, 1980 (age 46)
- Place of birth: Penedo, Brazil, Brazil
- Height: 1.85 m (6 ft 1 in)
- Position: Defender

Senior career*
Years	Team	Apps	(Gls)
2005	Corinthians		
2006–2007	Aves	25	(1)
2007–2008	Braga	4	(0)
2008	Pandurii Târgu Jiu	2	(0)
2008–2010	Portimonense	32	(1)
2010–2015	Moreirense	99	(1)
2015–2020	União de Leiria	68	(5)
2020–2022	Alcobaça	17	(0)
- * Club domestic league appearances and goals

José Anilton Júnior (July 10, 1980), known simply as Anilton, is a Brazilian former professional footballer who played as a centre-back. He spent most of his career in Portugal, having also played in his homeland Brazil and in Romania.
