= Daniel Faria =

Portuguese footballer

Personal information
- Full name: Daniel João Alves Faria
- Date of birth: 29 March 1987 (age 39)
- Place of birth: Braga, Portugal
- Height: 1.84 m (6 ft 1/2 in)
- Position: Defender

Youth career
- 1996–1999: Ferreirense
- 2000–2001: Ginásio Sé
- 2001–2006: Gil Vicente

Senior career*
Years	Team	Apps	(Gls)
2006–2014	Gil Vicente	71	(1)
2006–2008	→ Valdevez (loan)	30	(1)
Total		101	(2)
- * Club domestic league appearances and goals

Daniel João Alves Faria (born 29 March 1987) is a Portuguese former professional footballer who played as a right-back or a central defender.
