= Tó Barbosa =

Portuguese footballer

Personal information
- Full name: António João Ferradeira Santos
- Date of birth: 30 September 1992 (age 34)
- Place of birth: Vila do Conde, Portugal
- Height: 1.85 m (6 ft 1 in)
- Position: Forward

Youth career
- 2007–2009: Varzim
- 2009–2010: Ninense
- 2010–2011: Gil Vicente

Senior career*
Years	Team	Apps	(Gls)
2011–2014	Gil Vicente	9	(0)
2012–2014	→ Varzim (loan)	45	(2)
2014–2015	Limianos	13	(1)
2015–2016	Ninense	21	(5)
Total		88	(8)

International career
2012	Portugal U20	4	(0)
2013	Portugal U21	1	(0)
- * Club domestic league appearances and goals

António João Ferradeira Santos (born 30 September 1992), commonly known as Tó Barbosa, is a Portuguese former professional footballer who played as a forward.
