= Hugo Vieira =

Portuguese footballer (born 1988)

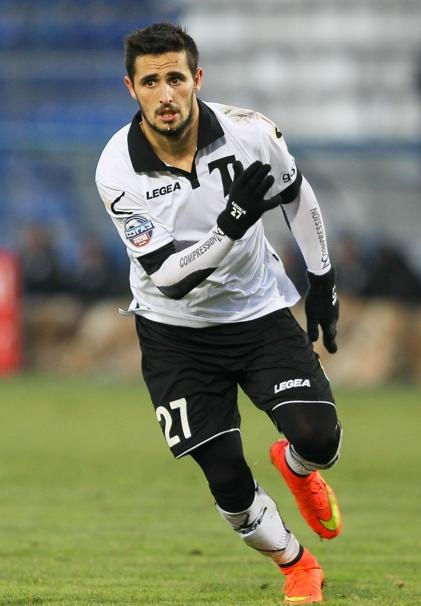
- Hugo Vieira with Torpedo Moscow in 2014

Personal information
- Full name: Hugo Filipe da Costa Oliveira
- Date of birth: 25 July 1988 (age 38)
- Place of birth: Barcelos, Portugal
- Height: 1.78 m (5 ft 10 in)
- Position: Forward

Youth career
- 1998–2006: Santa Maria

Senior career*
Years	Team	Apps	(Gls)
2006–2009	Santa Maria	41	(37)
2006	→ Bordeaux B (loan)	20	(4)
2007–2008	→ Estoril (loan)	0	(0)
2009–2012	Gil Vicente	62	(16)
2012–2013	Benfica	0	(0)
2012–2013	→ Sporting Gijón (loan)	2	(0)
2013	→ Gil Vicente (loan)	14	(8)
2013–2014	Braga	6	(0)
2013	Braga B	1	(0)
2014	→ Gil Vicente (loan)	14	(3)
2014–2015	Torpedo Moscow	20	(3)
2015–2016	Red Star	43	(27)
2017–2018	Yokohama F. Marinos	59	(23)
2019–2020	Sivasspor	0	(0)
2020	Gil Vicente	11	(1)
2020	Hokkaido Consadole	3	(0)
2021	U Craiova 1948	9	(1)
2022	Hibernians	11	(3)
2023–2024	Santa Maria	28	(28)
Total		344	(154)
- * Club domestic league appearances and goals

Hugo Filipe da Costa Oliveira (born 25 July 1988), known as Hugo Vieira, is a Portuguese former professional footballer who played as a forward.

He had four spells with Gil Vicente, winning the Segunda Liga in 2011, and represented that team and Braga in the Primeira Liga. Additionally, he played in eight foreign countries, providing a key role in Red Star's Serbian SuperLiga conquest in 2016.

== Career ==
=== Early career ===
Born in Barcelos, Hugo Vieira made his debut as a senior with FC Girondins de Bordeaux's reserve team, after finishing his development with Santa Maria FC. In July 2007, he was loaned to G.D. Estoril Praia, but made no appearances for the side.

In 2009, Hugo Vieira signed for Gil Vicente F.C. in the Segunda Liga, helping achieve promotion to the Primeira Liga as champions at the end of the 2010–11 season. On 22 March 2012, he scored to open their 2–2 draw with S.C. Braga at the Estádio Cidade de Barcelos in the semi-finals of the Taça da Liga, eventually won in a penalty shootout.

=== Benfica and Braga ===
Hugo Vieira agreed to a four-year deal with S.L. Benfica on 18 May 2012. On 28 August, he was loaned to Spanish Segunda División club Sporting de Gijón in a season-long deal, but after being rarely used he returned to Gil on 22 January 2013, being loaned until June.

On 23 August 2013, Hugo Vieira moved to Braga after agreeing to a four-year contract, but started only once over the course of the top-flight campaign. He returned to Gil Vicente for a third spell the following 30 January, on a temporary basis.

=== Torpedo Moscow ===
On 1 September 2014, Hugo Vieira joined FC Torpedo Moscow, newly promoted to the Russian Premier League. On his debut thirteen days later, he replaced Kirill Kombarov at the hour-mark and scored a consolation in a 3–1 defeat at FC Spartak Moscow.

In a season troubled by the death of his partner Edina Carvalho from cancer in January 2015, Hugo Vieira did not find the net again until the penultimate game, when his two penalties helped to a 3–1 win over FC Ural Sverdlovsk Oblast at the Eduard Streltsov Stadium. The team would eventually suffer a double relegation.

=== Red Star ===
On 30 June 2015, Hugo Vieira signed a two-year deal with Red Star Belgrade. On 12 September, he scored twice in the 3–1 Eternal Derby home victory over FK Partizan, and later said he had dedicated it to Carvalho. He netted a brace against FK Čukarički on 6 December (7–2 away triumph) and a hat-trick to help beat FK Radnik Surdulica six days later (5–0, home), as the capital team went on to win a 27th title; the national footballers' union voted him player of the season, and he was a contender for top scorer until missing the final game against FK Radnički Niš, in which his teammate Aleksandar Katai overtook him to 21 goals.

=== Yokohama ===
On 7 January 2017, Hugo Vieira moved to the fifth foreign country of his career, signing for Yokohama F. Marinos in Japan; David Babunski made the same move from Red Star days later. He made his debut in the J1 League as a late substitute on 25 February, scoring the equaliser in a 3–2 home defeat of Urawa Red Diamonds in the season opener. In his first year in the Far East, his team came runners-up in the Emperor's Cup, with him finishing a hat-trick at the end of extra time to best Sanfrecce Hiroshima 3–2 in the fourth round on 20 September.

While Yokohama finished in the bottom half of the 2018 J1 League, Hugo Vieira was in the top ten goalscorers with 13. This included a hat-trick in a 4–4 draw with Shonan Bellmare at the Nissan Stadium on 21 April.

=== Sivasspor ===
Hugo Vieira returned to European football in January 2019, signing an 18-month deal with Sivasspor in Turkey. Before making an appearance, he suffered an injury to his left knee and required surgery, ending his involvement for the season.

On 31 October 2019, Hugo Vieira finally made the first of only two appearances for the side from Sivas, coming on in the 59th minute for Abdou Razack Traoré and scoring the last goal of a 6–0 win away to Başkent Akademi FK in the fourth round of the domestic cup.

=== Later years ===
On 28 January 2020, after over five years abroad, Hugo Vieira returned to Portugal's top division and Gil Vicente. Despite signing a new one-year contract in August, he terminated it on 6 October.

Hugo Vieira returned to Japan's top flight with Hokkaido Consadole Sapporo on 29 October 2020. After playing three games in what remained of the season, he was released.

On 7 July 2021, Hugo Vieira signed a one-year deal with FC U Craiova 1948 of the Romanian Liga I, with the option of a further season. Nineteen days later, in his second game, he scored the only goal of a home victory over FC Dinamo București. On 7 January 2022, his contract was unilaterally terminated by the club.

On 31 January 2022, Hugo Vieira joined Hibernians F.C. of the Maltese Premier League until 30 June. In July 2023, the 35-year-old returned to Portugal and Santa Maria.

== Career statistics ==
As of 2 December 2018

Appearances and goals by club, season and competition
Club	Season	League			National cup		League cup		Continental		Other		Total	
Club	Season	Division	Apps	Goals	Apps	Goals	Apps	Goals	Apps	Goals	Apps	Goals	Apps	Goals
Santa Maria	2005–06	Honra – série A	15	7	—		—		—		—		15	7
Santa Maria	2006–07	Honra – série A	—		—		—		—		—		—	
Santa Maria	2007–08	Honra – série A	10	15	—		—		—		—		10	15
Santa Maria	2008–09	Honra – série A	16	15	—		—		—		—		16	15
Santa Maria	Total		41	37	—		—		—		—		41	37
Bordeaux B (loan)	2006–07	CFA Group C	20	4	—		—		—		—		20	4
Estoril (loan)	2007–08	Segunda Liga	0	0	—		—		—		—		0	0
Gil Vicente	2009–10	Segunda Liga	11	3	1	0	2	0	—		—		14	3
Gil Vicente	2010–11	Segunda Liga	23	7	0	0	5	5	—		—		28	12
Gil Vicente	2011–12	Primeira Liga	28	6	0	0	5	1	—		—		33	7
Gil Vicente	Total		62	16	1	0	12	6	—		—		75	22
Benfica	2012–13	Primeira Liga	0	0	—		—		—		—		0	0
Benfica	2013–14	Primeira Liga	0	0	—		—		—		—		0	0
Benfica	Total		0	0	—		—		—		—		0	0
Sporting Gijón (loan)	2012–13	Segunda División	2	0	2	0	—		—		—		4	0
Gil Vicente (loan)	2012–13	Primeira Liga	14	8	—		—		—		—		14	8
Braga	2013–14	Primeira Liga	6	0	0	0	0	0	0	0	—		6	0
Braga	2014–15	Primeira Liga	0	0	—		—		—		—		0	0
Braga	Total		6	0	0	0	0	0	0	0	—		6	0
Braga B	2013–14	Segunda Liga	1	0	—		—		—		—		1	0
Gil Vicente (loan)	2013–14	Primeira Liga	14	3	—		—		—		—		14	3
Torpedo Moscow	2014–15	Russian Premier League	20	3	2	0	—		—		—		22	3
Red Star Belgrade	2015–16	Serbian SuperLiga	33	20	2	0	—		—		—		35	20
Red Star Belgrade	2016–17	Serbian SuperLiga	10	7	1	1	—		5	0	—		16	8
Red Star Belgrade	Total		43	27	3	1	—		5	0	—		51	28
Yokohama F. Marinos	2017	J1 League	28	10	5	5	5	3	—		—		38	18
Yokohama F. Marinos	2018	J1 League	31	13	3	4	10	5	—		—		44	22
Yokohama F. Marinos	Total		59	23	8	9	15	8	—		—		82	40
Career total			282	121	16	10	27	14	5	0	—		330	145

== Honours ==
Santa Maria

- AF Braga Divisão de Honra: 2008–09

Gil Vicente

- Segunda Liga: 2010–11

Red Star

- Serbian SuperLiga: 2015–16

Individual

- Taça da Liga top scorer: 2010–11 (5 goals)
- Serbian SuperLiga Player of the Season: 2015–16
- Serbian SuperLiga Team of the Season: 2015–16
