= Rodrigo Galo =

Brazilian footballer

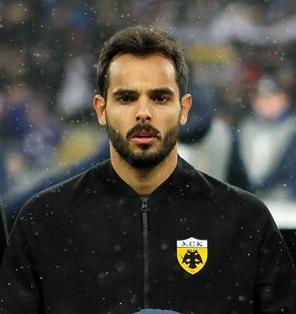
- Rodrigo Galo with AEK Athens

Personal information
- Full name: Rodrigo Galo Brito
- Date of birth: 19 September 1986 (age 40)
- Place of birth: Rio Branco, Brazil
- Height: 1.74 m (5 ft 9 in)
- Position: Right-back

Youth career
- 2000–2004: Juventus-AC
- 2005–2006: Avaí

Senior career*
| Years | Team | Apps | (Gls) |
| 2006–2008 | Avaí | 31 | (0) |
| 2008–2011 | Gil Vicente | 86 | (12) |
| 2011–2014 | Braga | 0 | (0) |
| 2012 | → Gil Vicente (loan) | 17 | (3) |
| 2012–2013 | → Académica de Coimbra (loan) | 21 | (0) |
| 2013–2014 | → Panetolikos (loan) | 33 | (2) |
| 2014–2015 | Paços de Ferreira | 10 | (1) |
| 2015–2019 | AEK Athens | 112 | (9) |
| 2019–2021 | Atromitos | 52 | (3) |
| 2021–2022 | Casa Pia | 16 | (0) |
- * Club domestic league appearances and goals

Rodrigo Galo Brito (born 19 September 1986) is a Brazilian former professional footballer who played as a right-back.

== Career ==
=== Early career ===
In 2000, Rodrigo Galo joined the academy of club Juventus. He spent four years playing for the club's youth teams. In 2005, he moved to Avaí, signing a professional contract with the club in 2006 for a period of two years. He made 31 appearances for the club, all as a substitute. In the summer 2008, the Rodrigo Galo moved to Portuguese side Gil Vicente. He scored 12 goals in 86 matches for the Barcelos-based club. In the summer 2011, Galo signed for Braga, but was sent back to Gil Vicente on loan. Further loans at Académica de Coimbra and Greek Super League side Panetolikos followed. In the summer of 2014, he moved to Paços de Ferreira.

=== AEK Athens ===
In May 2015 Rodrigo Galo signed a two-year contract with the Greek club AEK. On 22 August 2015, he made his debut and scored his first goal for the club in a 3–0 home win against Platanias. In May 2016, Rodrigo Galo played the full 90 minutes of the Greek Cup Final as AEK beat Οlympiacos 2–1. His contract was renewed for another two years in October 2017. Rodrigo Galo made 27 league appearances in 2017–18, helping AEK to their first Super League title in 24 years, with his only league goal coming in a 3–0 Athenian derby win over Panathinaikos.

At the end of the season, Süper Lig side Ankaragücü attempted to sign Rodrigo Galo but the offer was rejected, and shortly after he scored his first ever goal in a UEFA competition in a 2–1 home win game against Celtic for UEFA Champions League Third qualifying round, 2nd leg.

=== Later career ===
At the end of the 2018–19 season Rodrigo Galo moved to another Greek club, Atromitos. After making 52 league appearances in two league seasons he transferred to Portuguese club Casa Pia in 2021.

== Career statistics ==
Appearances and goals by club, season and competition
| Club | Season | League | | | Cup | | Continental | | Other | | Total | |
| Club | Season | Division | Apps | Goals | Apps | Goals | Apps | Goals | Apps | Goals | Apps | Goals |
|---|---|---|---|---|---|---|---|---|---|---|---|---|
| Gil Vicente | 2008–09 | LigaPro | 19 | 0 | 0 | 0 | — | | 2 | 1 | 21 | 1 |
| Gil Vicente | 2009–10 | LigaPro | 29 | 6 | 3 | 0 | — | | 2 | 0 | 34 | 6 |
| Gil Vicente | 2010–11 | LigaPro | 26 | 2 | 1 | 0 | — | | 8 | 2 | 35 | 4 |
| Gil Vicente | Total | | 74 | 8 | 4 | 0 | — | | 12 | 3 | 90 | 11 |
| Braga | 2011–12 | Primeira Liga | 0 | 0 | 1 | 0 | 0 | 0 | 0 | 0 | 1 | 0 |
| Gil Vicente (loan) | 2011–12 | Primeira Liga | 16 | 3 | 0 | 0 | — | | 4 | 0 | 20 | 3 |
| Académica de Coimbra (loan) | 2012–13 | Primeira Liga | 21 | 0 | 2 | 0 | 1 | 0 | 4 | 0 | 28 | 0 |
| Panetolikos (loan) | 2013–14 | Super League Greece | 33 | 2 | 1 | 0 | — | | — | | 34 | 2 |
| Paços de Ferreira | 2014–15 | Primeira Liga | 10 | 1 | 2 | 0 | — | | 0 | 0 | 12 | 1 |
| AEK Athens | 2015–16 | Super League Greece | 31 | 1 | 6 | 0 | — | | — | | 37 | 1 |
| AEK Athens | 2016–17 | Super League Greece | 28 | 0 | 6 | 1 | 2 | 0 | — | | 36 | 1 |
| AEK Athens | 2017–18 | Super League Greece | 27 | 1 | 10 | 1 | 9 | 0 | — | | 46 | 2 |
| AEK Athens | 2018–19 | Super League Greece | 26 | 1 | 8 | 2 | 7 | 1 | — | | 41 | 4 |
| AEK Athens | Total | | 112 | 3 | 30 | 4 | 18 | 1 | — | | 160 | 8 |
| Atromitos | 2019–20 | Super League Greece | 22 | 3 | 2 | 0 | — | | — | | 24 | 3 |
| Atromitos | 2020–21 | Super League Greece | 30 | 0 | 0 | 0 | — | | — | | 30 | 0 |
| Atromitos | Total | | 52 | 3 | 2 | 0 | — | | — | | 54 | 3 |
| Career total | | | 318 | 18 | 42 | 4 | 19 | 1 | 24 | 3 | 399 | 29 |

== Honours ==
AEK Athens

- Super League Greece: 2017–18
- Greek Cup: 2015–16

Individual

- Super League Greece Team of the Season: 2013–14, 2015–16
