= Adriano Facchini (footballer) =

Brazilian footballer (born 1983)

Personal information
- Full name: Adriano Facchini
- Date of birth: 12 March 1983 (age 43)
- Place of birth: Xaxim, Brazil
- Height: 1.87 m (6 ft 1 1/2 in)
- Position: Goalkeeper

Youth career
- 1998: Guarany de Xaxim
- 1999: Ponteserradense
- 2000: Curitibanos
- 2001: União do Vale
- 2002: Santos
- 2003: Portuguesa Santista

Senior career*
Years	Team	Apps	(Gls)
2004	Portuguesa Santista	0	(0)
2005	Jabaquara	15	(0)
2006	Castanhal		
2007	Ananindeua		
2008	Comercial-SP		
2008	Boavista-RJ		
2009	Teresópolis		
2009	América de Natal		
2009–2011	União Madeira	64	(0)
2011–2015	Gil Vicente	119	(0)
2015–2017	Karabükspor	40	(0)
2017	Nacional	15	(0)
2017–2018	Aves	20	(0)
2018–2019	Al Batin	25	(0)
2019–2020	Giresunspor	23	(0)
2020–2021	Cova Piedade	24	(0)
2021–2022	Vilafranquense	20	(0)
Total		350+	(0)
- * Club domestic league appearances and goals

Adriano Facchini (born 12 March 1983) is a Brazilian former professional footballer who played as a goalkeeper.

== Club career ==
Facchini was born in Xaxim, Santa Catarina. After playing youth football with Santos FC, he competed exclusively in his country's lower leagues. In 2009, aged 26, he moved to Portugal with C.F. União, going on to spend two years in the third division.

In the summer of 2011, Facchini remained in the nation and joined Primeira Liga side Gil Vicente FC, signing a three-year contract. He made his debut in the competition on 12 August in a 2–2 home draw against S.L. Benfica, and was the undisputed starter for the Barcelos team during his spell.

On 1 July 2015, after suffering relegation to the Segunda Liga, Facchini left the club and agreed to a one-year deal at Kardemir Karabükspor. He returned to Portugal in January 2017, on a contract at C.D. Nacional running until June 2019.

Facchini joined top-flight C.D. Aves ahead of the 2017–18 campaign, on a two-year contract. He totalled 24 appearances during his tenure, being an unused substitute in the final of the Taça de Portugal on 20 May 2018, a 2–1 win over Sporting CP.

== Honours ==
Aves

- Taça de Portugal: 2017–18
