= Jorge Baptista =

Portuguese footballer (born 1977)

Personal information
- Full name: Jorge Carlos Santos Moreira Baptista
- Date of birth: 2 April 1977 (age 49)
- Place of birth: Mafamude, Portugal
- Height: 1.86 m (6 ft 1 in)
- Position: Goalkeeper

Youth career
- 1989–1995: Dragões Sandinenses

Senior career*
Years	Team	Apps	(Gls)
1995–2000	Dragões Sandinenses		
2000–2002	Machico	65	(0)
2002–2003	Espinho	21	(0)
2003–2004	Dragões Sandinenses	32	(0)
2004–2005	Estoril	26	(0)
2005–2007	Gil Vicente	44	(0)
2007–2008	Leixões	4	(0)
2008–2011	Naval	8	(0)
2011–2012	Gil Vicente	12	(0)
2012–2013	Covilhã	37	(0)
2013–2014	Leixões	26	(0)
2014–2015	Freamunde	1	(0)
2015–2016	Trofense	19	(0)
Total		295	(0)
- * Club domestic league appearances and goals

Jorge Carlos Santos Moreira Baptista (born 2 April 1977) is a Portuguese former professional footballer who played as a goalkeeper.

== Club career ==
Born in Mafamude, Vila Nova de Gaia, Porto District, Baptista spent the vast majority of his senior career in the lower levels of Portuguese football. In the Primeira Liga he represented, as a starter, G.D. Estoril Praia and Gil Vicente FC (suffering relegation with both, although only due to irregularities in the second case), being a backup at Leixões S.C. and Associação Naval 1º de Maio.

In late January 2011, aged nearly 34, Baptista returned to former club Gil Vicente, with the Barcelos-based club now in the second division.
