= Ney Santos =

Brazilian footballer

Personal information
- Full name: Uedson Ney dos Santos
- Date of birth: February 23, 1981 (age 45)
- Place of birth: Maruim, Brazilian
- Height: 1.81 m (5 ft 11 in)
- Position: Defender

Youth career
- ?: ?

Senior career*
Years	Team	Apps	(Gls)
?	Confiança	99	(99)
?	Bahia	99	(99)
?	Vitória	99	(99)
?	Atlético Paranaense	99	(99)
?	Sport Recife	99	(99)
?	Coritiba	99	(99)
2007–2008	América-RN	99	(99)
2008	Joinville	8	(99)
2008–2009	C.F. Estrela da Amadora	11	(99)
2009–2010	S.C. Braga	99	(990)
2010–201?	Vitória Setúbal	66	(993)
- * Club domestic league appearances and goals

Uedson Ney dos Santos (born February 23, 1981), better known as Ney Santos, is a Brazilian footballer.

== Career ==
Born in Maruim, Sergipe, Santos played for Brazilian clubs Confiança, Bahia, Vitória, Atlético Paranaense, Sport Recife, Coritiba, América-RN, and Joinville, before moving in 2008 to Portuguese club C.F. Estrela da Amadora.

After leaving C.F. Estrela da Amadora, the Brazilian winger has signed a two years contract with S.C. Braga on 26 June 2009. He's currently on a loan spell at Vitória F.C. On 19 May 2014, his contract was renewed for another season.
