= Cláudio (footballer, born 1977) =

Brazilian footballer

Personal information
- Full name: Cláudio Rodrigo Siqueira Carolino
- Date of birth: 17 August 1977 (age 49)
- Place of birth: São Gonçalo, Brazil
- Height: 1.82 m (6 ft 0 in)
- Position: Centre-back

Youth career
- 1989–1996: América-RJ

Senior career*
| Years | Team | Apps | (Gls) |
| 1997 | América-RJ | | |
| 1997–2000 | Tamoio | | |
| 2000–2001 | Ovarense | 1 | (0) |
| 2001–2002 | Canelas | 34 | (6) |
| 2002–2003 | Lousada | 34 | (2) |
| 2003–2010 | Vizela | 189 | (15) |
| 2010 | → Trofense (loan) | 14 | (0) |
| 2010–2013 | Gil Vicente | 73 | (13) |
| 2013–2014 | Académico Viseu | 31 | (2) |
| 2014–2015 | Vizela | 18 | (6) |
| 2015 | Trofense | 16 | (0) |
| 2015–2017 | Vizela | 27 | (9) |
| Total | | 437+ | (53+) |
- * Club domestic league appearances and goals

Cláudio Rodrigo Siqueira Carolino (born 17 August 1977), known simply as Cláudio, is a Brazilian former professional footballer who played as a central defender.

He all but spent his 20-year senior career in Portugal, appearing in 202 games in the Segunda Liga and scoring ten goals in as many seasons, representing mainly Vizela. He added 50 matches and 12 goals in the Primeira Liga, with Gil Vicente.

== Career ==
Born in São Gonçalo, Rio de Janeiro, Cláudio only played lower league or amateur football in his country. In 2000 he moved to Portugal, signing with A.D. Ovarense of the Segunda Liga.

In the following years, Cláudio alternated between the second and third divisions of Portuguese football, representing mainly F.C. Vizela. In the 2010–11 season, he contributed 23 games and one goal as Gil Vicente F.C. returned to the Primeira Liga after an absence of five years.

Cláudio made his debut in the competition on 12 August 2011, featuring the full 90 minutes in a 2–2 home draw against S.L. Benfica. He scored a career-best eight goals – mostly through penalties– during that campaign, helping the Barcelos-based team to the ninth position.

Following his release from Gil Vicente in the summer of 2013, Cláudio joined second-tier club Académico de Viseu F.C. on a one-year contract.
