= Estádio Cidade de Barcelos =

Stadium in Barcelos, Portugal

Coordinates: 41.551°N 8.623°W

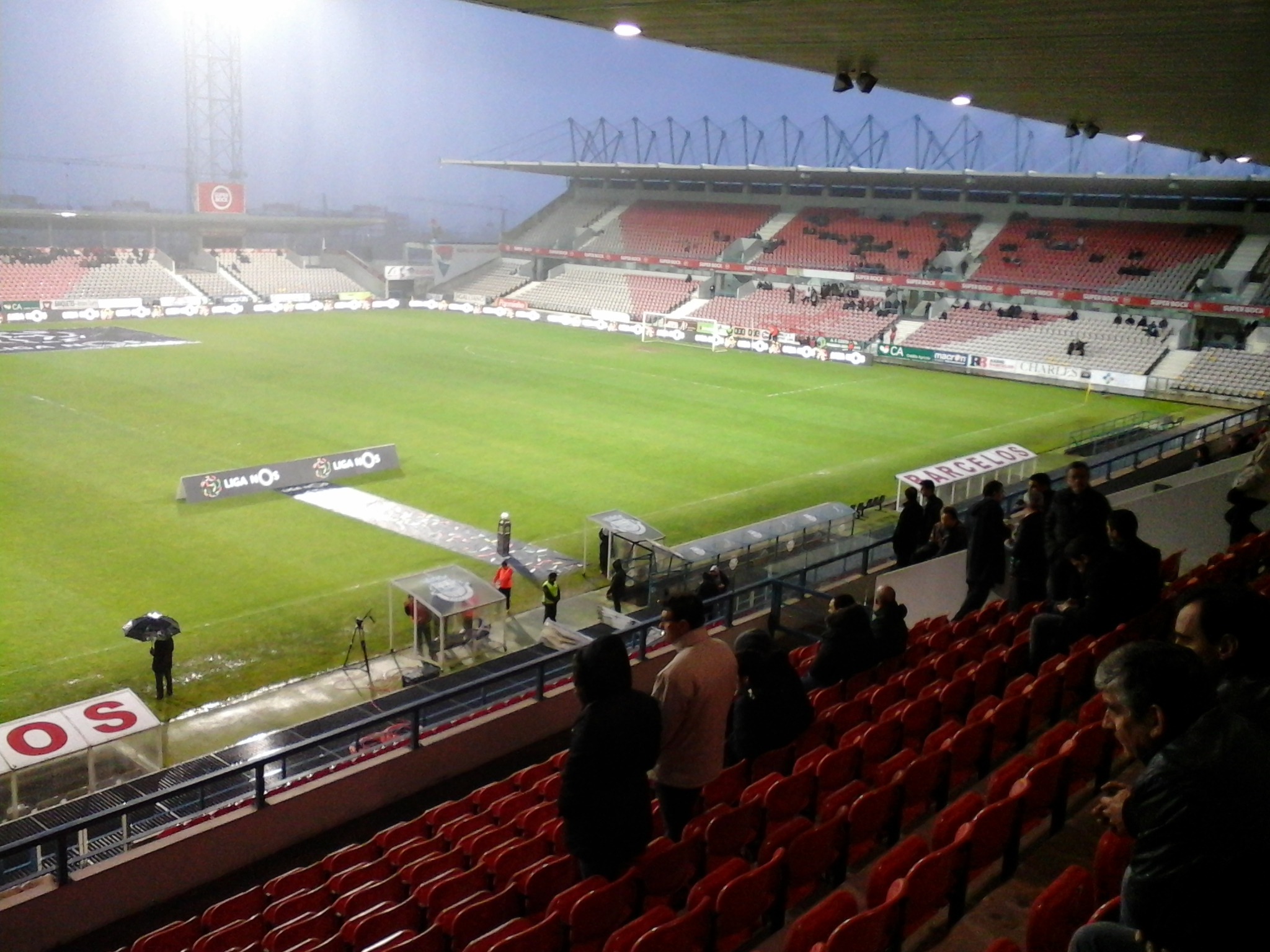
- UEFA
- Interactive map of Estádio Cidade de Barcelos
- Full name: Estádio Cidade de Barcelos
- Location: Barcelos, Portugal
- Owner: Municipality of Barcelos
- Capacity: 12,046
- Surface: Grass
- Record attendance: 12,500 (31 October 2004); Gil Vicente 1–1 S.L. Benfica
- Field size: 105 x 68 m

Construction
- Built: 2004; 22 years ago
- Opened: 30 May 2004
- Cost: €22 million

Tenant
- Gil Vicente F.C.

Website
- Municipality of Barcelos

The Estádio Cidade de Barcelos is a multi-use stadium in Barcelos, Portugal. It is mostly used for football matches. It is the home of Primeira Liga side Gil Vicente.

The stadium is able to hold 12,046 people and was built in 2004. It replaced Estadio Adelino Ribeiro Novo which was Gil's home ground from its establishment in the 1920s until 2004.

The stadium is a UEFA Category 3 ground, which allows for European and international games to be played there.

== History ==
The Old Field, Estádio Adelino Ribeiro Novo, served as Gil Vicente’s home ground for roughly 70 years, hosting the club’s matches and many notable moments in its history.

The truth is that the conditions offered by the Adelino Ribeiro Novo pitch were quite limited and obviously not in line with the demands of professional football, nor with Gil Vicente's ambitions or the image of the city of Barcelos.

Therefore, the local authority decided to build a new sports complex that included a modern football stadium. Thus, the Cidade de Barcelos Stadium was built in the parish of Vila Boa in the municipality of Barcelos, to the north of the city, for an amount close to 22 million euros, including exterior fittings and the purchase of the land.

The stadium was officially inaugurated on 30 May 2004, in a friendly football match between Gil Vicente and Nacional Montevideo from Uruguay, the second choice after Santos from Brazil, in which the Gilistas were defeated 2–1 in front of 4,984 people. However, the Barcelos City Council decided to hold a ‘second inauguration', with a concert by Julio Iglesias on 2 July 2004, which turned out to be a failure, with attendance falling far short of what was expected.

It held two matches of the 2006 UEFA European Under-21 Football Championship: Serbia & Montenegro 0–1 Germany and Portugal 0–2 Serbia & Montenegro.

== Portugal national team matches ==
The following national team matches were held in the stadium.

#	Date	Score	Opponent	Competition
1.	26 March 2005	4–1	Canada	Friendly

== See also ==
- List of football stadiums in Portugal
