= 2015–16 Taça de Portugal =

Taça de Portugal Placard

Tournament details
- Country: Portugal
- Dates: 5 September 2015 – 22 May 2016
- Teams: 155

Final positions
- Champions: Braga (2nd title)
- Runners-up: Porto

Tournament statistics
- Matches played: 170
- Goals scored: 546 (3.21 per match)

The 2015–16 Taça de Portugal was the 76th season of the Taça de Portugal, the premier knockout competition in Portuguese football. As of this season, it became also known as Taça de Portugal Placard due to sponsorship by sports betting game Placard.

The competition was contested by a total of 155 clubs – an increase of 20 clubs compared to the previous edition – including teams from the top-three tiers of the Portuguese football league system (Note: Reserve or B teams are not eligible to participate.) and representatives of the fourth-tier District leagues and cups. It began with the first-round matches on 5 September 2015 and concluded on 22 May 2016, with the final at the Estádio Nacional in Oeiras.

Making their second final appearance in two seasons, Braga defeated Porto 4–2 in a penalty shoot-out (following a 2–2 draw at the end of extra time to win the competition for the second time, 50 years after their first triumph in the 1965–66 edition. The title holders were Sporting CP, who were eliminated in the fifth round by Braga in a replay of the previous final.

== Format ==
As in the previous season, the competition format was organised in a knockout system consisting of seven rounds before the final match. For this season, the number of participating clubs increased from 135 to 155, to accommodate twice the number of teams from the District levels. The concept of repechage was introduced, meaning that teams eliminated in one round could still compete in later rounds, to provide an even number of teams necessary to avoid byes.

A total of 118 teams entered the tournament in the first round, 78 competing in the third-tier Campeonato de Portugal and 40 representatives from the District Football Associations. In the second round, the previous round winners were joined by the 19 teams competing in the second-tier LigaPro. In the third round, the 18 top-tier Primeira Liga teams entered the competition for the first time, playing against the 46 winners of the second round. In both second and third rounds, teams from higher tiers played away against teams from lower tiers; after the third round, the draw had no restrictions.

Unlike the earlier one-legged rounds, the semi-finals are played as two-legged ties, with home and away matches. The final is played as a one-off match at a neutral venue, traditionally the Estádio Nacional in Oeiras.

Round	Teams remaining	Teams involved	Teams from the previous round	New teams in this round	Leagues entering in this round (tier level)
First round	155	118	none	118	Campeonato de Portugal (3rd); District Football Associations (4th)
Second round	110	92	59+14	19	LigaPro (2nd)
Third round	64	64	46	18	Primeira Liga (1st)
Fourth round	32	32	32	none	none
Fifth round	16	16	16	none	none
Quarter-finals	8	8	8	none	none
Semi-finals	4	4	4	none	none
Final	2	2	2	none	none

== Teams ==
A total of 155 teams competing in the top-four tiers of Portuguese football plus the winners (or losing finalists) of the District Football Association Cups were considered eligible by the Portuguese Football Federation to participate in the competition:

2015–16 Taça de Portugal teams
Primeira Liga (18 teams)

- Académica
- Arouca
- Belenenses
- Benfica
- Boavista
- Braga
- Estoril
- Marítimo
- Moreirense
- Nacional
- Paços de Ferreira
- Porto
- Rio Ave
- Sporting CP
- Tondela
- União da Madeira
- Vitória de Guimarães
- Vitória de Setúbal

LigaPro (19 teams)

- Académico de Viseu
- Atlético CP
- Chaves
- Desportivo das Aves
- Famalicão
- Farense
- Feirense
- Freamunde
- Gil Vicente
- Leixões
- Mafra
- Olhanense
- Oliveirense
- Oriental
- Penafiel
- Portimonense
- Santa Clara
- Sporting da Covilhã
- Varzim

Campeonato de Portugal (78 teams)

Series A (9 teams) (Note: Marítimo B, a reserve team which plays in the Series A, is ineligible to play in the competition.)

- Argozelo
- Bragança
- Camacha
- Limianos
- Mirandela
- Neves
- Pedras Salgadas
- Vianense
- Vilaverdense

Series B (9 teams) (Note: Varzim B, a reserve team which plays in the Series B, is ineligible to play in the competition.)

- AD Oliveirense
- Arões
- Fafe
- Felgueiras 1932
- Mondinense
- São Martinho
- Torcatense
- Trofense
- Vizela

Series C (10 teams)

- Amarante
- Cinfães
- Coimbrões
- Gondomar
- Pedras Rubras
- Salgueiros
- Sobrado
- Sousense
- Tirsense
- Vila Real

Series D (10 teams)

- Anadia
- Bustelo
- Cesarense
- Estarreja
- Gafanha
- Lusitânia de Lourosa
- Lusitano de Vildemoinhos
- Mortágua
- Oliveira de Frades
- Sanjoanense

Series E (10 teams)

- Académica – SF (Note: Not to be confused with Associação Académica de Coimbra – O.A.F. (from Primeira Liga).)
- AD Nogueirense
- Angrense
- Oliveira do Hospital
- Operário
- Pampilhosa
- Praiense
- Sabugal
- Sporting Ideal
- Tourizense

Series F (10 teams)

- Águias do Moradal
- Alcanenense
- Benfica e Castelo Branco
- Caldas
- Crato
- Naval 1º de Maio
- Peniche
- Sertanense
- União de Leiria
- Vitória de Sernache

Series G (10 teams)

- 1º de Dezembro
- Atlético da Malveira
- Casa Pia
- Coruchense
- Eléctrico
- Loures
- Real
- Sacavenense
- Sintrense
- Torreense

Series H (10 teams)

- Almancilense
- Atlético de Reguengos
- Barreirense
- Castrense
- Cova da Piedade
- Juventude de Évora
- Louletano
- Lusitano VRSA
- Moura
- Pinhalnovense

District Football Associations (40 teams)
- Algarve FA: Lagoa (C) & Moncarapachense (L)
- Angra do Heroísmo FA: None
- Aveiro FA: São Roque (F) & Recreio de Águeda (L)
- Beja FA: Praia de Milfontes (C) & Vasco da Gama da Vidigueira (L)
- Braga FA: Amares (C) & Maria da Fonte (L)
- Bragança FA: Águia de Vimioso (C) & Torre de Moncorvo (L)
- Castelo Branco FA: Alcains (C) & Estação (L)
- Coimbra FA: Vigor da Mocidade (C) & União de Gavinhos (L)
- Évora FA: Redondense (F) & Sporting de Viana do Alentejo (L)
- Guarda FA: Trancoso (F) & Manteigas (L)
- Horta FA: Fayal (C)
- Leiria FA: Ginásio de Alcobaça (F) & Leiria e Marrazes (L)
- Lisboa FA: Povoense (C) & Vilafranquense (L)
- Madeira FA: Pontassolense (C)
- Ponta Delgada FA: Mira Mar (C)
- Portalegre FA: Mosteirense (F) & Gavionenses (L)
- Porto FA: Oliveira do Douro (C) & Rio Tinto (L)
- Santarém FA: Amiense (F) & União de Tomar (L)
- Setúbal FA: Alcochetense (C) & Amora (L)
- Viana do Castelo FA: Vitorino dos Piães (F) & Atlético dos Arcos (L)
- Vila Real FA: Montalegre (C) & Régua (L)
- Viseu FA: Carregal do Sal (C) & Penalva do Castelo (L)
- Azores League: Rabo de Peixe (L)

C – Cup winner; F – Cup finalist; L – League spot.

== Schedule ==
All draws are held at the FPF headquarters in Lisbon. Match kick-off times are in WET (UTC+0) from the fourth round to the semi-finals, and in WEST (UTC+1) during the rest of the competition.

Round	Draw date	Main date(s)	Fixtures	Teams	Prize money
First round	31 July 2015	5–6 September 2015	59	155 → 110	€2,000
Second round	14 September 2015	26–27 September 2015	46	110 → 64	€3,000
Third round	1 October 2015	17–18 October 2015	32	64 → 32	€4,000
Fourth round	23 October 2015	21–22 November 2015	16	32 → 16	€5,000
Fifth round	26 November 2015	15–17 December 2015	8	16 → 8	€7,500
Quarter-finals	21 December 2015	12–14 January 2016	4	8 → 4	€10,000
Semi-finals	21 December 2015	2–4 February 2016 (1st leg); 1–3 March 2016 (2nd leg)	4	4 → 2	€15,000
Final	21 December 2015	22 May 2016	1	2 → 1	€300,000 (winner) €150,000 (runner-up)

== First round ==
A total of 118 teams from the Campeonato de Portugal (CP) and the District Football Associations (D) entered the first round. The draw took place on Friday, 31 July 2015, at 11:00 WEST. The teams were divided into eight groups of 14 or 16 teams according to geographic criteria. Matches were played on 5, 6, 16 and 23 September 2015.

Number of teams per tier entering this round
Primeira Liga	LigaPro	Campeonato de Portugal	District FAs	Total
18 / 18	19 / 19	78 / 78	40 / 40	155 / 155

Fixtures

Series A

- Torcatense (CP) 3–3 (a.e.t.) (3–4 p) Maria da Fonte (D)
- Águia de Vimioso (D) 3–3 (a.e.t.) (2–4 p) Amares (D)
- Atlético dos Arcos (D) 0–0 (a.e.t.) (3–2 p) Limianos (CP)
- Vianense (CP) 1–0 Neves (CP)
- Montalegre (D) 1–0 (a.e.t.) Vitorino dos Piães (D)
- Pontassolense (D) 0–4 Argozelo (CP)
- Vilaverdense (CP) 1–2 Bragança (CP)
- Camacha (CP) 2–1 Pedras Salgadas (CP)

Series B

- São Martinho (CP) 2–0 Arões (CP)
- Fafe (CP) 1–0 Vizela (CP)
- Mondinense (CP) 3–2 Mirandela (CP)
- Tirsense (CP) 0–0 (a.e.t.) (4–2 p) Felgueiras 1932 (CP)
- Vila Real (CP) 2–3 (a.e.t.) Amarante (CP)
- Pedras Rubras (CP) 1–0 AD Oliveirense (CP)
- Trofense (CP) 1–0 Sobrado (CP)

Series C

- Sanjoanense (CP) 4–1 Sousense (CP)
- Gondomar (CP) 2–1 Coimbrões (CP)
- Bustelo (CP) 0–1 Lusitânia de Lourosa (CP)
- Cinfães (CP) 0–1 Salgueiros (CP)
- Régua (D) 1–3 Rio Tinto (D)
- São Roque (D) 1–2 Torre de Moncorvo (D)
- Oliveira do Douro (D) 4–3 (a.e.t.) Cesarense (CP)

Series D

- Lusitano de Vildemoinhos (CP) 2–0 Gafanha (CP)
- Estarreja (CP) 5–2 (a.e.t.) Carregal do Sal (D)
- Tourizense (CP) 1–2 Oliveira do Hospital (CP)
- Oliveira de Frades (CP) 4–0 Manteigas (D)
- Recreio de Águeda (D) 4–0 Trancoso (D)
- Anadia (CP) 5–3 Sabugal (CP)
- Penalva do Castelo (D) 2–3 (a.e.t.) Mortágua (CP)

Series E

- Alcains (D) 0–1 Operário (CP)
- Rabo de Peixe (D) 1–4 União de Gavinhos (D)
- Águias do Moradal (CP) 6–1 Fayal (D)
- Sporting Ideal (CP) 3–0 Vigor da Mocidade (D)
- Pampilhosa (CP) 7–0 Estação (D)
- Praiense (CP) 7–0 Mira Mar (D)
- AD Nogueirense (CP) 1–3 Naval 1º de Maio (CP)
- Angrense (CP) 2–1 Académica – SF (CP)

Series F

- Alcanenense (CP) 2–1 Eléctrico (CP)
- Peniche (CP) 1–2 Caldas (CP)
- Vitória de Sernache (CP) 1–2 (a.e.t.) Crato (CP)
- Benfica e Castelo Branco (CP) 9–0 Amiense (D)
- Leiria e Marrazes (D) 0–1 Ginásio de Alcobaça (D)
- União de Tomar (D) 0–7 União de Leiria (CP)
- Sertanense (CP) 4–0 Gavionenses (D)

Series G

- Alcochetense (D) 0–1 Loures (CP)
- Atlético da Malveira (CP) 5–2 Barreirense (CP)
- Mosteirense (D) 1–4 1º de Dezembro (CP)
- Redondense (D) 0–2 Sacavenense (CP)
- Real (CP) 3–1 Sintrense (CP)
- Cova da Piedade (CP) 1–0 Torreense (CP)
- Coruchense (CP) 2–1 Povoense (D)
- Casa Pia (CP) 1–3 Vilafranquense (D)

Series H

- Praia de Milfontes (D) 2–3 Sporting de Viana do Alentejo (D)
- Pinhalnovense (CP) 2–1 Atlético de Reguengos (CP)
- Almancilense (CP) 0–1 Moura (CP)
- Lagoa (D) 1–1 (a.e.t.) (4–3 p) Amora (D)
- Juventude de Évora (CP) 0–5 Louletano (CP)
- Castrense (CP) 2–0 Vasco da Gama da Vidigueira (D)
- Lusitano VRSA (CP) 2–0 Moncarapachense (D)

== Second round ==
A total of 92 teams participated in the second round, comprising the 59 winners of the previous round, the 19 non-reserve teams competing in the 2015–16 LigaPro (II), and 14 teams randomly drawn from among the first-round losers (repechage). The draw took place on Monday, 14 September 2015, at 11:00 WEST. Matches were played on 26–27 September and 8 October 2015. According to the new competition regulations, Segunda Liga sides played their matches away against lower division opponents.

Number of teams per tier entering this round
Primeira Liga	LigaPro	Campeonato de Portugal	District FAs	Total
18 / 18	19 / 19	53 / 78	20 / 40	110 / 155

Repechage

The following 14 first-round losing teams were selected to compete in the second round:

- Alcochetense (D)
- Almancilense (CP)
- Amiense (D)
- Bustelo (CP)
- Casa Pia (CP)
- Coimbrões (CP)
- Gafanha (CP)
- Leiria e Marrazes (D)
- Limianos (CP)
- Manteigas (D)
- Mosteirense (D)
- Sabugal (CP)
- São Roque (D)
- Vitorino dos Piães (D)

Fixtures

26 September 2015	União de Leiria (CP)	0–0 (a.e.t.) (3–4 p)	(II) Chaves	Leiria
15:00 WEST (UTC+01:00)				Stadium: Estádio Dr. Magalhães Pessoa

26 September 2015	Sabugal (CP)	0–2	(II) Feirense	Sabugal
15:00 WEST (UTC+01:00)				Stadium: Estádio Municipal do Sabugal

26 September 2015	Sporting de Viana do Alentejo (D)	1–2	(CP) Naval 1º de Maio	Viana do Alentejo
15:00 WEST (UTC+01:00)				Stadium: Campo João de Sousa Faria e Melo

26 September 2015	Moura (CP)	1–2 (a.e.t.)	(CP) Angrense	Moura
15:00 WEST (UTC+01:00)				Stadium: Estádio do Moura AC

26 September 2015	Trofense (CP)	2–2 (a.e.t.) (6–5 p)	(II) Atlético CP	Trofa
16:00 WEST (UTC+01:00)				Stadium: Estádio do CD Trofense

27 September 2015	Louletano (CP)	2–1	(II) Freamunde	Loulé
15:00 WEST (UTC+01:00)				Stadium: Estádio Municipal de Loulé

27 September 2015	Coruchense (CP)	0–0 (a.e.t.) (4–3 p)	(II) Oliveirense	Coruche
15:00 WEST (UTC+01:00)				Stadium: Estádio Municipal Prof. José Peseiro

27 September 2015	Lagoa (D)	0–3	(II) Penafiel	Lagoa
15:00 WEST (UTC+01:00)				Stadium: Estádio Capitão Josino da Costa

27 September 2015	Pinhalnovense (CP)	0–2 (a.e.t.)	(II) Leixões	Pinhal Novo
15:00 WEST (UTC+01:00)				Stadium: Campo de Jogos Santos Jorge

27 September 2015	Recreio de Águeda (D)	0–2	(II) Académico de Viseu	Águeda
15:00 WEST (UTC+01:00)				Stadium: Estádio Municipal de Águeda

27 September 2015	Limianos (CP)	0–1	(II) Desportivo das Aves	Ponte de Lima
15:00 WEST (UTC+01:00)				Stadium: Campo do Cruzeiro

27 September 2015	Amiense (D)	0–1	(II) Portimonense	Amiais de Baixo
15:00 WEST (UTC+01:00)				Stadium: Campo da Azenha

27 September 2015	Real (CP)	1–3	(II) Oriental	Queluz
15:00 WEST (UTC+01:00)				Stadium: Complexo Desportivo do Real SC

27 September 2015	Almancilense (CP)	0–2	(II) Olhanense	Salir
15:00 WEST (UTC+01:00)				Stadium: Parque de Jogos Joaquim António Teixeira

27 September 2015	Pampilhosa (CP)	1–0	(II) Mafra	Pampilhosa (Mealhada)
15:00 WEST (UTC+01:00)				Stadium: Campo Municipal Carlos Duarte

27 September 2015	Oliveira do Douro (D)	3–5	(II) Gil Vicente	Oliveira do Douro
15:00 WEST (UTC+01:00)				Stadium: Estádio Municipal da Lavandeira

27 September 2015	Maria da Fonte (D)	0–2	(II) Varzim	Póvoa de Lanhoso
15:00 WEST (UTC+01:00)				Stadium: Campo dos Moinhos Novos

27 September 2015	Oliveira do Hospital (CP)	3–4 (a.e.t.)	(II) Farense	Oliveira do Hospital
15:00 WEST (UTC+01:00)				Stadium: Estádio Municipal de Oliveira do Hospital

27 September 2015	Alcanenense (CP)	2–2 (a.e.t.) (4–3 p)	(II) Sporting da Covilhã	Alcanena
15:00 WEST (UTC+01:00)				Stadium: Estádio Municipal Joaquim Maria Baptista

27 September 2015	Castrense (CP)	0–5	(II) Famalicão	Castro Verde
15:00 WEST (UTC+01:00)				Stadium: Estádio Municipal 25 de Abril

27 September 2015	Sacavenense (CP)	0–3	(CP) Atlético da Malveira	Sacavém
15:00 WEST (UTC+01:00)				Stadium: Campo do Sacavenense

27 September 2015	Águias do Moradal (CP)	1–2	(CP) Salgueiros	Estreito (Oleiros)
15:00 WEST (UTC+01:00)				Stadium: Campo do Ventoso

27 September 2015	1º de Dezembro (CP)	2–3 (a.e.t.)	(CP) Sanjoanense	São Pedro de Penaferrim
15:00 WEST (UTC+01:00)				Stadium: Campo Conde de Sucena

27 September 2015	Amares (D)	1–2 (a.e.t.)	(CP) Operário	Amares
15:00 WEST (UTC+01:00)				Stadium: Estádio Eng. José Carlos Macedo

27 September 2015	Vilafranquense (D)	8–1	(D) Manteigas	Vila Franca de Xira
15:00 WEST (UTC+01:00)				Stadium: Campo do Cevadeiro

27 September 2015	Leiria e Marrazes (D)	3–2 (a.e.t.)	(CP) Mondinense	Marrazes (Leiria)
15:00 WEST (UTC+01:00)				Stadium: Campo de Futebol Aldeia do Desporto

27 September 2015	Atlético dos Arcos (D)	2–0 (a.e.t.)	(D) Alcochetense	Arcos de Valdevez
15:00 WEST (UTC+01:00)				Stadium: Estádio Municipal da Coutada

27 September 2015	Vitorino dos Piães (D)	0–1	(D) Torre de Moncorvo	Barroselas
15:00 WEST (UTC+01:00)				Stadium: Complexo Desportivo de Barroselas

27 September 2015	Mortágua (CP)	1–2	(D) Rio Tinto	Mortágua
15:00 WEST (UTC+01:00)				Stadium: Campo da Gandarada

27 September 2015	Cova da Piedade (CP)	2–1	(CP) Lusitano VRSA	Cova da Piedade
15:00 WEST (UTC+01:00)				Stadium: Estádio Municipal José Martins Vieira

27 September 2015	Crato (CP)	0–2 (a.e.t.)	(CP) Loures	Crato
15:00 WEST (UTC+01:00)				Stadium: Estádio Municipal do Crato

27 September 2015	Amarante (CP)	8–0	(D) São Roque	Amarante
15:00 WEST (UTC+01:00)				Stadium: Estádio Municipal de Amarante

27 September 2015	Gafanha (CP)	1–2 (a.e.t.)	(CP) Fafe	Gafanha da Nazaré
15:00 WEST (UTC+01:00)				Stadium: Complexo Desportivo da Gafanha da Nazaré

27 September 2015	São Martinho (CP)	0–1	(CP) Benfica e Castelo Branco	São Martinho do Campo
15:00 WEST (UTC+01:00)				Stadium: Campo Comendador Abílio Ferreira de Oliveira

27 September 2015	Caldas (CP)	2–1	(CP) Tirsense	Caldas da Rainha
15:00 WEST (UTC+01:00)				Stadium: Campo da Mata

27 September 2015	Argozelo (CP)	1–3	(CP) Sertanense	Vimioso
15:00 WEST (UTC+01:00)				Stadium: Estádio Municipal de Vimioso

27 September 2015	Oliveira de Frades (CP)	0–1 (a.e.t.)	(CP) Coimbrões	Oliveira de Frades
15:00 WEST (UTC+01:00)				Stadium: Parque Desportivo de Oliveira de Frades

27 September 2015	União de Gavinhos (D)	3–1	(CP) Camacha	Gavinhos (Penacova)
15:00 WEST (UTC+01:00)				Stadium: Campo da Feira Nova

27 September 2015	Ginásio de Alcobaça (D)	0–5	(CP) Casa Pia	Alcobaça
15:00 WEST (UTC+01:00)				Stadium: Estádio Municipal de Alcobaça

27 September 2015	Estarreja (CP)	1–2	(CP) Lusitânia de Lourosa	Estarreja
15:00 WEST (UTC+01:00)				Stadium: Estádio do CD Estarreja

27 September 2015	Gondomar (CP)	3–1	(CP) Anadia	Gondomar
15:00 WEST (UTC+01:00)				Stadium: Estádio de São Miguel

27 September 2015	Bragança (CP)	4–1	(CP) Lusitano de Vildemoinhos	Bragança
15:00 WEST (UTC+01:00)				Stadium: Estádio Municipal Eng. José Luís Pinheiro

27 September 2015	Bustelo (CP)	2–2 (a.e.t.) (2–4 p)	(CP) Vianense	Bustelo (Oliveira de Azeméis)
15:00 WEST (UTC+01:00)				Stadium: Campo da Quinta do Côvo

27 September 2015	Praiense (CP)	4–0	(D) Montalegre	Praia da Vitória, Azores
16:00 WEST (UTC+01:00)				Stadium: Estádio Municipal da Praia da Vitória

27 September 2015	Sporting Ideal (CP)	0–2	(D) Mosteirense	Ribeira Grande, Azores
16:00 WEST (UTC+01:00)				Stadium: Estádio Municipal da Ribeira Grande

8 October 2015	Pedras Rubras (CP)	0–0 (a.e.t.) (6–7 p)	(II) Santa Clara	Pedras Rubras
19:00 WEST (UTC+01:00)				Stadium: Estádio Municipal de Pedras Rubras

== Third round ==
A total of 64 teams participated in the third round, which included the 46 winners of the previous round and the 18 teams competing in the 2015–16 Primeira Liga (I). The draw took place on Thursday, 1 October 2015, at 12:00 WEST. Matches were played on 16–18 October 2015. Similarly to what occurred with Segunda Liga teams in the previous round, Primeira Liga sides played their matches away against lower division teams.

Number of teams per tier entering this round
Primeira Liga	LigaPro	Campeonato de Portugal	District FAs	Total
18 / 18	14 / 19	25 / 78	7 / 40	64 / 155

Fixtures

16 October 2015	Vianense (CP)	1–2	(I) Benfica	Barcelos
20:30 WEST (UTC+01:00)	Coulibaly 79'		Carcela 38'; Jardel 90'	Stadium: Estádio Cidade de Barcelos; Attendance: 8,000; Referee: João Pinheiro

17 October 2015	Casa Pia (CP)	3–1	(II) Oriental	Lisbon
14:00 WEST (UTC+01:00)	Coito 14'; Guti 63'; Freitas 67'		Grilo 73'	Stadium: Estádio Pina Manique; Referee: Hélder Malheiro

17 October 2015	Olhanense (II)	0–1	(I) Belenenses	Olhão
15:00 WEST (UTC+01:00)			Dias 34'	Stadium: Estádio José Arcanjo; Referee: Bruno Esteves

17 October 2015	Trofense (CP)	1–0	(II) Santa Clara	Trofa
15:00 WEST (UTC+01:00)	Vítor Hugo 7'			Stadium: Estádio do CD Trofense; Referee: Pedro Campos

17 October 2015	Louletano (CP)	0–5	(II) Chaves	Loulé
15:00 WEST (UTC+01:00)			Fausto 35' (o.g.); Fall 45', 53'; Pinto 83', 90'	Stadium: Estádio Municipal de Loulé; Referee: Bruno Rebocho

17 October 2015	Famalicão (II)	1–1 (a.e.t.) (4–5 p)	(II) Feirense	Vila Nova de Famalicão
15:00 WEST (UTC+01:00)	Mércio 56'		Kukula 86'	Stadium: Estádio Municipal 22 de Junho; Referee: João Capela
	Penalties
	Amessan (penalty missed); Mendes (penalty scored); Lima (penalty scored); Luiz Alberto (penalty scored); Monteiro (penalty scored); Correia (penalty missed)		(penalty scored) Platiny; (penalty scored) Serginho; (penalty scored) Rocha; (penalty scored) Ícaro; (penalty missed) Erivaldo; (penalty scored) Makaridze

17 October 2015	Desportivo das Aves (II)	3–2 (a.e.t.)	(I) Moreirense	Vila das Aves
17:00 WEST (UTC+01:00)	Pedró 70' (pen.); Pedroso 90'; Cássio 91'		Martins 81' (pen.); Medeiros 89'	Stadium: Estádio do CD Aves; Referee: Carlos Xistra

17 October 2015	Vilafranquense (D)	0–4	(I) Sporting CP	Estoril
17:30 WEST (UTC+01:00)			M. Pereira 12', 16'; Bruno Paulista 41'; G. Martins 77'	Stadium: Estádio António Coimbra da Mota; Attendance: 2,832; Referee: Sérgio Piscarreta

17 October 2015	Académico de Viseu (II)	0–3	(I) Braga	Viseu
18:00 WEST (UTC+01:00)			Stojiljković 2'; Filipe Augusto 5' (pen.); Eduardo 62'	Stadium: Estádio do Fontelo; Referee: Bruno Paixão

17 October 2015	Coruchense (CP)	0–2	(I) Vitória de Setúbal	Coruche
19:00 WEST (UTC+01:00)			Claro 11'; François 74'	Stadium: Estádio Municipal Prof. José Peseiro; Referee: Nuno Almeida

17 October 2015	Varzim (II)	0–2	(I) Porto	Póvoa de Varzim
20:15 WEST (UTC+01:00)			Tello 20'; André 90'	Stadium: Estádio do Varzim SC; Attendance: 7,000; Referee: Manuel Oliveira

18 October 2015	Gondomar (CP)	0–1 (a.e.t.)	(I) Estoril	Gondomar
14:00 WEST (UTC+01:00)			Bonatini 96' (pen.)	Stadium: Estádio de São Miguel; Referee: Manuel Mota

18 October 2015	Coimbrões (CP)	2–3	(CP) Fafe	Coimbrões (Vila Nova de Gaia)
14:00 WEST (UTC+01:00)	Carvalho 23', 39'		Silvestre 7'; Alan Júnior 30', 46' (pen.)	Stadium: Parque Silva Matos; Referee: Leonardo Marques

18 October 2015	Cova da Piedade (CP)	4–3	(CP) Alcanenense	Cova da Piedade
14:00 WEST (UTC+01:00)	Caramelo 78', 88'; Bicho 82'; Ceitil 90+3'		Cláudio 30'; Soma 51', 63'	Stadium: Estádio Municipal José Martins Vieira; Referee: Rui Rodrigues

18 October 2015	Atlético dos Arcos (D)	0–3	(CP) Caldas	Arcos de Valdevez
14:00 WEST (UTC+01:00)			Zaporo 1'; Simões 90+4'; Sabino 90+5'	Stadium: Estádio Municipal da Coutada; Referee: Carlos Dias

18 October 2015	Pampilhosa (CP)	0–5	(II) Portimonense	Pampilhosa (Mealhada)
14:00 WEST (UTC+01:00)			Pires 3'; Dener 9'; Fabrício 55'; Marcel 75'; Possignolo 79'	Stadium: Campo Municipal Carlos Duarte; Referee: Hélder Lamas

18 October 2015	Loures (CP)	1–2 (a.e.t.)	(I) Boavista	Loures
15:00 WEST (UTC+01:00)	Augusto 73'		Zé Manuel 61', 113'	Stadium: Campo José da Silva Faria; Referee: Tiago Martins

18 October 2015	União de Gavinhos (D)	0–3	(I) Rio Ave	Gavinhos (Penacova)
15:00 WEST (UTC+01:00)			Guedes 52'; Kayembe 82'; Tarantini 90+1'	Stadium: Campo da Feira Nova; Referee: Tiago Antunes

18 October 2015	Leixões (II)	1–2 (a.e.t.)	(I) Arouca	Matosinhos
15:00 WEST (UTC+01:00)	João Pedro 80'		Valente 54'; Rodrigues 102'	Stadium: Estádio do Mar; Referee: Cosme Machado

18 October 2015	Gil Vicente (II)	2–1	(I) Tondela	Barcelos
15:00 WEST (UTC+01:00)	Pecks 65'; Platiny 80'		Luís Alberto 16'	Stadium: Estádio Cidade de Barcelos; Referee: Hugo Miguel

18 October 2015	Sanjoanense (CP)	1–5	(I) Académica	São João da Madeira
15:00 WEST (UTC+01:00)	Messi 49'		Lopes 7', 51'; Rui Pedro 36' (pen.); Paciência 84'; Marinho 90'	Stadium: Estádio Conde Dias Garcia; Referee: André Moreira

18 October 2015	Naval 1º de Maio (CP)	1–7	(I) Paços de Ferreira	Figueira da Foz
15:00 WEST (UTC+01:00)	Leite 47' (pen.)		Rocha 20'; Jota 22', 45'; Moreira 39' (pen.), 42', 65', 90+1'	Stadium: Estádio Municipal José Bento Pessoa; Referee: Fábio Veríssimo

18 October 2015	Mosteirense (D)	0–6	(I) Nacional	Arronches
15:00 WEST (UTC+01:00)			Soares 5', 74', 84'; Agra 35'; L. Aurélio 75', 90+1'	Stadium: Estádio Municipal Francisco Palmeiro; Referee: Luís Godinho

18 October 2015	Sertanense (CP)	1–5	(I) União da Madeira	Sertã
15:00 WEST (UTC+01:00)	Nzola 27'		Monteiro 4' (pen.), 47' (pen.), 82' (pen.); Dias 32'; Farías 85'	Stadium: Campo de Jogos Dr. Marques dos Santos; Referee: Jorge Ferreira

18 October 2015	Lusitânia de Lourosa (CP)	0–2 (a.e.t.)	(I) Marítimo	Lourosa
15:00 WEST (UTC+01:00)			Ferreira 110'; Marega 119'	Stadium: Estádio do Lusitânia FC Lourosa; Referee: Luís Ferreira

18 October 2015	Farense (II)	1–0	(D) Rio Tinto	Faro
15:00 WEST (UTC+01:00)	Luzardo 34' (pen.)			Stadium: Estádio de São Luís; Referee: João Bento

18 October 2015	Amarante (CP)	2–2 (a.e.t.) (3–2 p)	(CP) Bragança	Amarante
15:00 WEST (UTC+01:00)	Césinha 57'; César 73'		Fragnoli 9' (pen.), 82' (pen.)	Stadium: Estádio Municipal de Amarante; Referee: Pedro Vilaça
	Penalties
	Miguelito (penalty scored); Césinha (penalty missed); Lopes (penalty scored); T. Silva (penalty scored)		(penalty missed) Corunha; (penalty scored) Lio; (penalty scored) Wellington; (penalty missed) Tiago; (penalty missed) Jony

18 October 2015	Atlético da Malveira (CP)	3–0	(CP) Praiense	Malveira (Mafra)
15:00 WEST (UTC+01:00)	Galamba 50'; Pedroso 59'; Zé Maria 61'			Stadium: Estádio das Seixas; Referee: Paulo Ferrás

18 October 2015	Angrense (CP)	4–1	(D) Torre de Moncorvo	Angra do Heroísmo, Azores
15:00 WEST (UTC+01:00)	Aguiar 48'; Reis 77'; Macedo 79', 90'		Rudi 64'	Stadium: Estádio Municipal de Angra do Heroísmo; Referee: André Gralha

18 October 2015	Leiria e Marrazes (D)	1–5	(CP) Benfica e Castelo Branco	Marrazes (Leiria)
15:00 WEST (UTC+01:00)	Douglas 69' (pen.)		Ngondo 5' (o.g.); Cristiano 55'; Pereira 57'; Zé Miguel 60'; Castanheira 80'	Stadium: Campo de Futebol Aldeia do Desporto; Referee: Hugo Silva

18 October 2015	Operário (CP)	1–0	(CP) Salgueiros	Lagoa, Azores
16:00 WEST (UTC+01:00)	Peixoto 73' (pen.)			Stadium: Estádio João Gualberto Borges Arruda; Referee: Tiago Cordeiro

18 October 2015	Penafiel (II)	2–0	(I) Vitória de Guimarães	Penafiel
19:15 WEST (UTC+01:00)	Yéro 50'; Abreu 69'			Stadium: Estádio Municipal 25 de Abril; Referee: Artur Soares Dias

== Fourth round ==
A total of 32 teams participated in the fourth round, all of which had advanced from the previous round. The draw took place on Friday, 23 October 2015, at 12:00 WEST, and unlike previous rounds, was free of restrictions. Matches were played on 20–22 November 2015.

Number of teams per tier entering this round
Primeira Liga	LigaPro	Campeonato de Portugal	District FAs	Total
15 / 18	7 / 19	10 / 78	0 / 40	32 / 155

Fixtures

20 November 2015	Portimonense (II)	3–2	(I) Belenenses	Portimão
20:30 WET (UTC±00:00)	Zambujo 13'; Ewerton 45', 90+3'		Pinto 62'; G. Silva 69'	Stadium: Estádio Municipal de Portimão; Referee: Luís Godinho

21 November 2015	Trofense (CP)	0–0 (a.e.t.) (1–4 p)	(I) Académica	Trofa
15:00 WET (UTC±00:00)				Stadium: Estádio do CD Trofense; Referee: Jorge Ferreira
	Penalties
	Sousa (penalty missed); João Pedro (penalty missed); Faria (penalty scored)		(penalty scored) Paciência; (penalty scored) Plange; (penalty scored) Aderlan; (penalty scored) Silva

21 November 2015	Atlético da Malveira (CP)	0–1	(II) Feirense	Malveira (Mafra)
15:00 WET (UTC±00:00)			Fabinho 57'	Stadium: Estádio das Seixas; Referee: Bruno Jesus

21 November 2015	Benfica e Castelo Branco (CP)	1–3	(II) Gil Vicente	Castelo Branco
15:00 WET (UTC±00:00)	Pereira 59'		Mahamat 28' (pen.); Zakpa 79'; Ebralidze 86'	Stadium: Estádio Municipal Vale do Romeiro; Referee: André Moreira

21 November 2015	Arouca (I)	0–0 (a.e.t.) (6–5 p)	(II) Chaves	Arouca
15:00 WET (UTC±00:00)				Stadium: Estádio Municipal de Arouca; Referee: João Pinheiro
	Penalties
	Coelho (penalty scored); Artur (penalty missed); Adilson (penalty scored); Lima (penalty scored); Basto (penalty scored); Maurides (penalty scored); Valente (penalty scored)		(penalty scored) Bamba; (penalty scored) Miguel Ângelo; (penalty scored) Patrão; (penalty missed) Ludovic; (penalty scored) Braga; (penalty scored) Barry; (penalty missed) Moura

21 November 2015	Angrense (CP)	0–2	(I) Porto	Angra do Heroísmo, Azores
18:00 WET (UTC±00:00)			Bueno 14', 40'	Stadium: Estádio João Paulo II; Attendance: 6,000; Referee: Luís Ferreira

21 November 2015	Sporting CP (I)	2–1 (a.e.t.)	(I) Benfica	Lisbon
20:00 WET (UTC±00:00)	A. Silva 45+2'; Slimani 112'		Mitroglou 6'	Stadium: Estádio José Alvalade; Attendance: 41,244; Referee: Jorge Sousa

22 November 2015	Fafe (CP)	1–1 (a.e.t.) (1–3 p)	(II) Penafiel	Fafe
14:00 WET (UTC±00:00)	Alan Júnior 48' (pen.)		Yéro 32'	Stadium: Estádio Municipal de Fafe; Referee: Vasco Santos
	Penalties
	Alan Júnior (penalty scored); Zé Diogo (penalty missed); Giovani (penalty missed); Landinho (penalty missed)		(penalty scored) Barros; (penalty scored) Abreu; (penalty missed) Martins; (penalty scored) Vieira

22 November 2015	Nacional (I)	5–0	(CP) Cova da Piedade	Funchal, Madeira
15:00 WET (UTC±00:00)	Zainadine 7'; Witi 45+1', 52'; Correia 71'; Agra 90'			Stadium: Estádio da Madeira; Referee: Tiago Antunes

22 November 2015	Desportivo das Aves (II)	3–3 (a.e.t.) (5–4 p)	(I) União da Madeira	Vila das Aves
15:00 WET (UTC±00:00)	Mendy 33'; Pedró 46'; Pedroso 78' (pen.)		Cádiz 26', 65'; Paulinho 67'	Stadium: Estádio do CD Aves; Referee: Rui Costa
	Penalties
	Ekedi (penalty scored); Tarcísio (penalty scored); Mendy (penalty scored); Pedroso (penalty scored); Pedró (penalty missed); Valente (penalty missed); Romaric (penalty scored)		(penalty scored) Fidalgo; (penalty scored) Joãozinho; (penalty missed) Gian; (penalty scored) Chaby; (penalty scored) Cádiz; (penalty missed) Andrade; (penalty missed) Paulinho

22 November 2015	Casa Pia (CP)	0–1	(I) Vitória de Setúbal	Lisbon
15:00 WET (UTC±00:00)			Suk 70'	Stadium: Estádio Pina Manique; Referee: Sérgio Piscarreta

22 November 2015	Boavista (I)	1–0	(CP) Operário	Porto
15:00 WET (UTC±00:00)	R. Santos 86'			Stadium: Estádio do Bessa; Referee: Rui Oliveira

22 November 2015	Caldas (CP)	0–1	(I) Estoril	Caldas da Rainha
15:00 WET (UTC±00:00)			Dieguinho 22'	Stadium: Campo da Mata; Referee: Nuno Almeida

22 November 2015	Amarante (CP)	1–0	(I) Marítimo	Amarante
15:00 WET (UTC±00:00)	Miguelito 44'			Stadium: Estádio Municipal de Amarante; Referee: Manuel Oliveira

22 November 2015	Farense (II)	0–1 (a.e.t.)	(I) Braga	Faro
18:00 WET (UTC±00:00)			Filipe Augusto 93' (pen.)	Stadium: Estádio de São Luís; Referee: Bruno Esteves

22 November 2015	Paços de Ferreira (I)	1–2	(I) Rio Ave	Paços de Ferreira
20:00 WET (UTC±00:00)	Lopes 64'		Marcelo 23'; Héldon 35'	Stadium: Estádio Capital do Móvel; Referee: Manuel Mota

== Fifth round ==
A total of 16 teams participated in the fifth round, all of which had advanced from the previous round. The draw took place on Thursday, 26 November 2015, at 11:00 WET. Matches were played on 15–17 December 2015.

Number of teams per tier entering this round
Primeira Liga	LigaPro	Campeonato de Portugal	District FAs	Total
10 / 18	5 / 19	1 / 78	0 / 40	16 / 155

Fixtures

15 December 2015	Vitória de Setúbal (I)	1–1 (a.e.t.) (1–3 p)	(I) Rio Ave	Setúbal
19:00 WET (UTC±00:00)	Suk 12'		Wakaso 49'	Stadium: Estádio do Bonfim; Referee: João Capela
	Penalties
	Costinha (penalty missed); Ruca (penalty scored); Suk (penalty missed); Alves (penalty missed)		(penalty scored) Ukra; (penalty missed) Héldon; (penalty missed) Edimar; (penalty scored) Novais; (penalty scored) Yazalde

16 December 2015	Desportivo das Aves (II)	2–2 (a.e.t.) (2–4 p)	(I) Nacional	Vila das Aves
15:00 WET (UTC±00:00)	Pedroso 90' (pen.); Guedes 114'		Agra 61'; Soares 105'	Stadium: Estádio do CD Aves; Referee: Artur Soares Dias
	Penalties
	Mendy (penalty missed); Pedroso (penalty scored); Guedes (penalty missed); Joel (penalty scored)		(penalty scored) Zainadine; (penalty scored) Agra; (penalty scored) Sequeira; (penalty scored) Soares

16 December 2015	Amarante (CP)	1–2	(I) Arouca	Amarante
15:00 WET (UTC±00:00)	Miguelito 64' (pen.)		Rodrigues 9'; Maurides 54'	Stadium: Estádio Municipal de Amarante; Referee: Vasco Santos

16 December 2015	Gil Vicente (II)	1–1 (a.e.t.) (4–3 p)	(II) Portimonense	Barcelos
17:00 WET (UTC±00:00)	Zakpa 45'		Fabrício 54'	Stadium: Estádio Cidade de Barcelos; Referee: Rui Oliveira
	Penalties
	Cadú (penalty scored); Kiki (penalty missed); Yeo (penalty scored); Ricardinho (penalty scored); Zakpa (penalty scored)		(penalty scored) Carvalhas; (penalty scored) Fabrício; (penalty missed) Pessoa; (penalty scored) Dener; (penalty missed) Fidélis

16 December 2015	Estoril (I)	1–0	(II) Penafiel	Estoril
17:00 WET (UTC±00:00)	Bonatini 11'			Stadium: Estádio António Coimbra da Mota; Referee: Hugo Miguel

16 December 2015	Feirense (II)	0–1	(I) Porto	Santa Maria da Feira
18:00 WET (UTC±00:00)			Aboubakar 10'	Stadium: Estádio Marcolino de Castro; Attendance: 4,639; Referee: Tiago Martins

16 December 2015	Braga (I)	4–3 (a.e.t.)	(I) Sporting CP	Braga
20:00 WET (UTC±00:00)	Eduardo 42'; Alan 54'; Marcelo Goiano 83'; Fonte 111'		Ruiz 10'; Slimani 57'; Carvalho 67'	Stadium: Estádio Municipal de Braga; Attendance: 10,863; Referee: Fábio Veríssimo

17 December 2015	Boavista (I)	1–0	(I) Académica	Porto
18:30 WET (UTC±00:00)	R. Santos 86'			Stadium: Estádio do Bessa; Referee: Rui Costa

== Quarter-finals ==
A total of eight teams participated in the quarter-finals, all of which had advanced from the previous round. The draw took place on Monday, 21 December 2015, at 12:00 WET. Matches were played on 13 January 2016.

Number of teams per tier entering this round
Primeira Liga	LigaPro	Campeonato de Portugal	District FAs	Total
7 / 18	1 / 19	0 / 78	0 / 40	8 / 155

Fixtures

13 January 2016	Gil Vicente (II)	1–0	(I) Nacional	Barcelos
16:00 WET (UTC±00:00)	Pecks 31'			Stadium: Estádio Cidade de Barcelos; Referee: Rui Costa

13 January 2016	Rio Ave (I)	3–0	(I) Estoril	Vila do Conde
16:30 WET (UTC±00:00)	Tarantini 7'; Krovinović 53'; Edimar 77'			Stadium: Estádio do Rio Ave FC; Referee: Jorge Ferreira

13 January 2016	Braga (I)	2–0	(I) Arouca	Braga
18:30 WET (UTC±00:00)	Basto 57' (o.g.); Stojiljković 60'			Stadium: Estádio Municipal de Braga; Referee: Carlos Xistra

13 January 2016	Boavista (I)	0–1	(I) Porto	Porto
20:30 WET (UTC±00:00)			Brahimi 24'	Stadium: Estádio do Bessa; Attendance: 6,234; Referee: Nuno Almeida

== Semi-finals ==
The semi-final pairings were determined on 21 December 2015, following the draw for the quarter-finals. This round was contested over two legs in a home-and-away system; the first leg was played on 3–4 February and the second leg was played on 2 March 2016.

Number of teams per tier entering this round
Primeira Liga	LigaPro	Campeonato de Portugal	District FAs	Total
3 / 18	1 / 19	0 / 78	0 / 40	4 / 155

Fixtures

3 February 2016
20:00 WET (UTC±00:00)

Gil Vicente (II)	0–3	(I) Porto
		Neves 45+1'; Suk 59'; Oliveira 70'

Estádio Cidade de Barcelos, Barcelos
Attendance: 4,092
Referee: Manuel Mota
2 March 2016
21:00 WET (UTC±00:00)

Porto (I)	2–0	(II) Gil Vicente
Awaziem 11'; Marega 80'

Estádio do Dragão, Porto
Attendance: 4,863
Referee: Sérgio Piscarreta

Porto won 5–0 on aggregate.

4 February 2016
20:00 WET (UTC±00:00)

Braga (I)	1–0	(I) Rio Ave
Pedro Santos 7' (pen.)

Estádio Municipal de Braga, Braga
Attendance: 7,537
Referee: Bruno Paixão
2 March 2016
19:00 WET (UTC±00:00)

Rio Ave (I)	0–0	(I) Braga

Estádio do Rio Ave FC, Vila do Conde
Attendance: 8,000
Referee: Nuno Almeida

Braga won 1–0 on aggregate.

== Final ==
22 May 2016
17:15 WEST (UTC+01:00)

Porto	2–2 (a.e.t.)	Braga
Silva 61', 90+1'		Fonte 12'; Josué 58'
Penalties
Layún (penalty scored); Herrera (penalty missed); Neves (penalty scored); M. Pereira (penalty missed)	2–4	(penalty scored) P. Santos; (penalty scored) Stojiljković; (penalty scored) Hassan; (penalty scored) Marcelo Goiano

Estádio Nacional, Oeiras
Attendance: 35,390
Referee: Artur Soares Dias (Porto)
