= José Vieira =

José Vieira may refer to:

- José Vieira (rower) (born 1932), Portuguese rower
- José Luandino Vieira (born 1935), Angolan writer
- José Macedo Vieira (born 1949), president of the city council of Póvoa de Varzim
- José Vieira Alvernaz (1898–1986), Portuguese prelate
- José Vieira Filho (born 1992), Brazilian footballer
- José Vieira Couto de Magalhães (1837–1898), Brazilian politician
