= Paulo Fonseca =

Portuguese footballer and manager (born 1973)

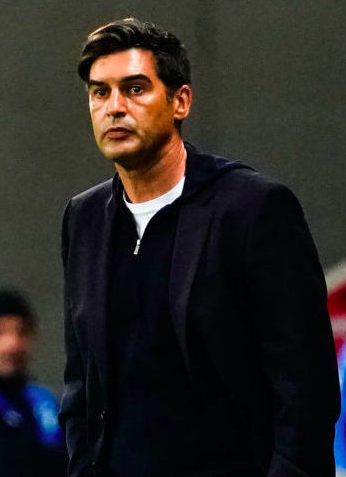
- Fonseca with Lille in 2022

Personal information
- Full name: Paulo Alexandre Rodrigues Fonseca
- Date of birth: 5 March 1973 (age 53)
- Place of birth: Nampula, Mozambique
- Height: 1.88 m (6 ft 2 in)
- Position: Centre-back

Team information
- Current team: Sporting CP (manager)

Youth career
- 1982–1983: Galitos
- 1983–1984: UD Vila Chã
- 1985–1986: Santoantoniense
- 1986–1991: Barreirense

Senior career*
Years	Team	Apps	(Gls)
1991–1995	Barreirense	91	(6)
1995–1998	Porto	0	(0)
1995–1996	→ Leça (loan)	22	(0)
1996–1997	→ Belenenses (loan)	27	(1)
1997–1998	→ Marítimo (loan)	31	(2)
1998–2000	Vitória Guimarães	6	(0)
2000–2005	Estrela Amadora	72	(4)
Total		249	(13)

Managerial career
- 2005–2007: Estrela Amadora (youth)
- 2007–2008: 1º Dezembro
- 2008–2009: Odivelas
- 2009–2011: Pinhalnovense
- 2011–2012: Aves
- 2012–2013: Paços Ferreira
- 2013–2014: Porto
- 2014–2015: Paços Ferreira
- 2015–2016: Braga
- 2016–2019: Shakhtar Donetsk
- 2019–2021: Roma
- 2022–2024: Lille
- 2024: AC Milan
- 2025–2026: Lyon
- 2026–: Sporting CP
- * Club domestic league appearances and goals

Paulo Alexandre Rodrigues Fonseca (born 5 March 1973) is a Portuguese professional football manager and former player who played as a central defender. He is currently head coach of Primeira Liga club Sporting CP.

He amassed Primeira Liga totals of 111 matches and three goals over seven seasons, representing Leça, Belenenses, Marítimo, Vitória de Guimarães and Estrela da Amadora.

Fonseca became a manager in 2005, notably winning the 2015–16 Taça de Portugal with Braga as well as three editions of the Ukrainian Premier League with Shakhtar Donetsk. He also coached Paços de Ferreira to a best-ever third place in the 2012–13 Primeira Liga, qualifying the club for the UEFA Champions League. Following a couple of seasons in charge of Roma in Serie A, he joined Lille in June 2022, leaving two years later and returning to Italy with AC Milan, being dismissed in December 2024.

== Playing career ==
Born in Nampula, Portuguese Mozambique to a military father, Fonseca was a year old when his family relocated to Barreiro following the Carnation Revolution. He played 14 years as a senior, beginning with his adopted hometown's Barreirense in the third division and moving straight to the Primeira Liga with Leça in the 1995–96 season, starting in 21 of his league appearances as the club finished 14th and narrowly avoided relegation. In the following five years he remained in the latter competition, being first choice with Belenenses and Marítimo but only a backup with Vitória de Guimarães and Estrela da Amadora.

Fonseca retired in June 2005 at the age of 32 after a further four campaigns with Estrela, three of those spent in the Segunda Liga. In the 2003–04 campaign he participated in 15 games as the Lisbon side ranked last in the top tier, with the subsequent relegation.

== Coaching career ==
=== Early years ===
Fonseca started coaching immediately after retiring, remaining two years at the helm of Estrela da Amadora's youths. From 2007 to 2011 he was in charge of several modest teams, notably Pinhalnovense which he led to the quarter-finals of the Taça de Portugal in both the 2009–10 and 2010–11 seasons.

In the 2011–12 campaign, Fonseca was appointed at Aves in division two for his first job in the professionals, and he led the team to the third position, just two points shy of promotion.

=== Paços Ferreira ===
In his first season in charge of a top-flight team, Fonseca led Paços de Ferreira to a third-place finish after signing a two-year contract on 28 May 2012. The club consequently qualified for the play-off round of the UEFA Champions League for the only time in its history; in the domestic league, they only lost to champions Porto and runners-up Benfica, notably winning both games against Braga (2–0 at home, 3–2 away) and Sporting CP (1–0 on both occasions).

Paços also reached the semi-finals of the Portuguese Cup that campaign, being knocked out by Benfica.

=== Porto ===
Fonseca succeeded Vítor Pereira at Porto – winners of the last three league titles – when he joined on a two-year deal on 10 June 2013. He started his spell on a high note, winning the year's Supertaça Cândido de Oliveira after a 3–0 victory over Vitória de Guimarães which marked his first honour as a coach.

However, on 5 March 2014, following a string of poor results that left the club in the third position in the league, nine points behind leaders Benfica, Fonseca was relieved of his duties. Previously, on 12 January, he had stated that Porto would be champions in the last matchday against that opponent.

=== Paços return and Braga ===
On 11 June 2014, Fonseca returned to Paços de Ferreira. His one season back at the Estádio da Mata Real resulted in an eighth-place finish, missing out on qualification for the UEFA Europa League on the final day.

Fonseca agreed to a two-year contract with Braga on 1 July 2015. He led them to fourth position, also winning the domestic cup for the first time in 50 years with a penalty shootout victory over Porto in the final. In the Europa League, they reached the last-eight stage.

=== Shakhtar Donetsk ===
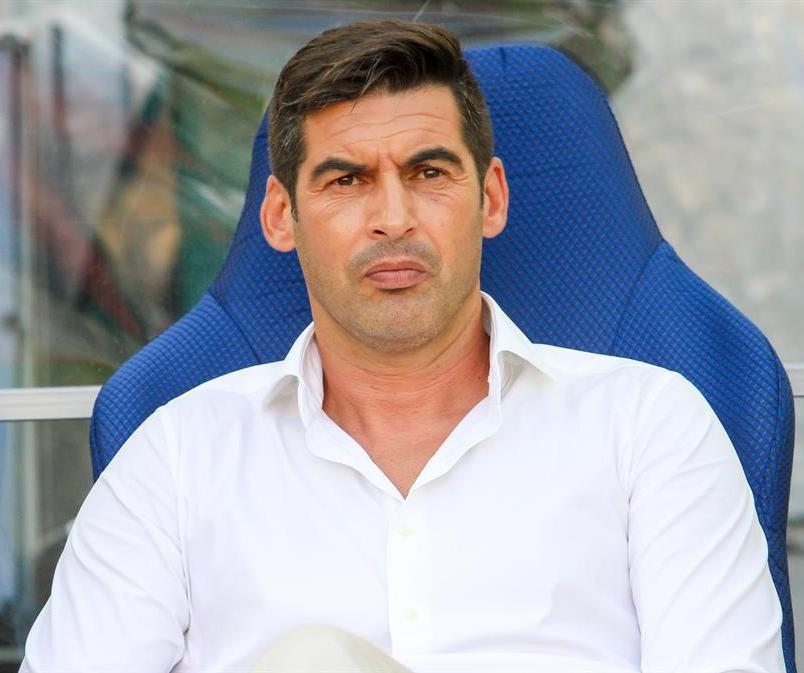
Fonseca with Shakhtar in August 2018

Fonseca moved abroad for the first time in his career on 31 May 2016, replacing legendary Mircea Lucescu (12 seasons) at the helm of Shakhtar Donetsk and signing a two-year contract at the Ukrainian Premier League side. He won the double in all three seasons of his spell– which earned him the distinction as the league's best coach in 2016–17.

Fonseca's side reached the round of 16 of the 2017–18 Champions League, after finishing second in the group stage following a 2–1 home defeat of Premier League club Manchester City. Having inflicted a first defeat in 29 matches of Pep Guardiola's side, he kept a promise to do his next press conference dressed as the fictional hero Zorro.

=== Roma ===
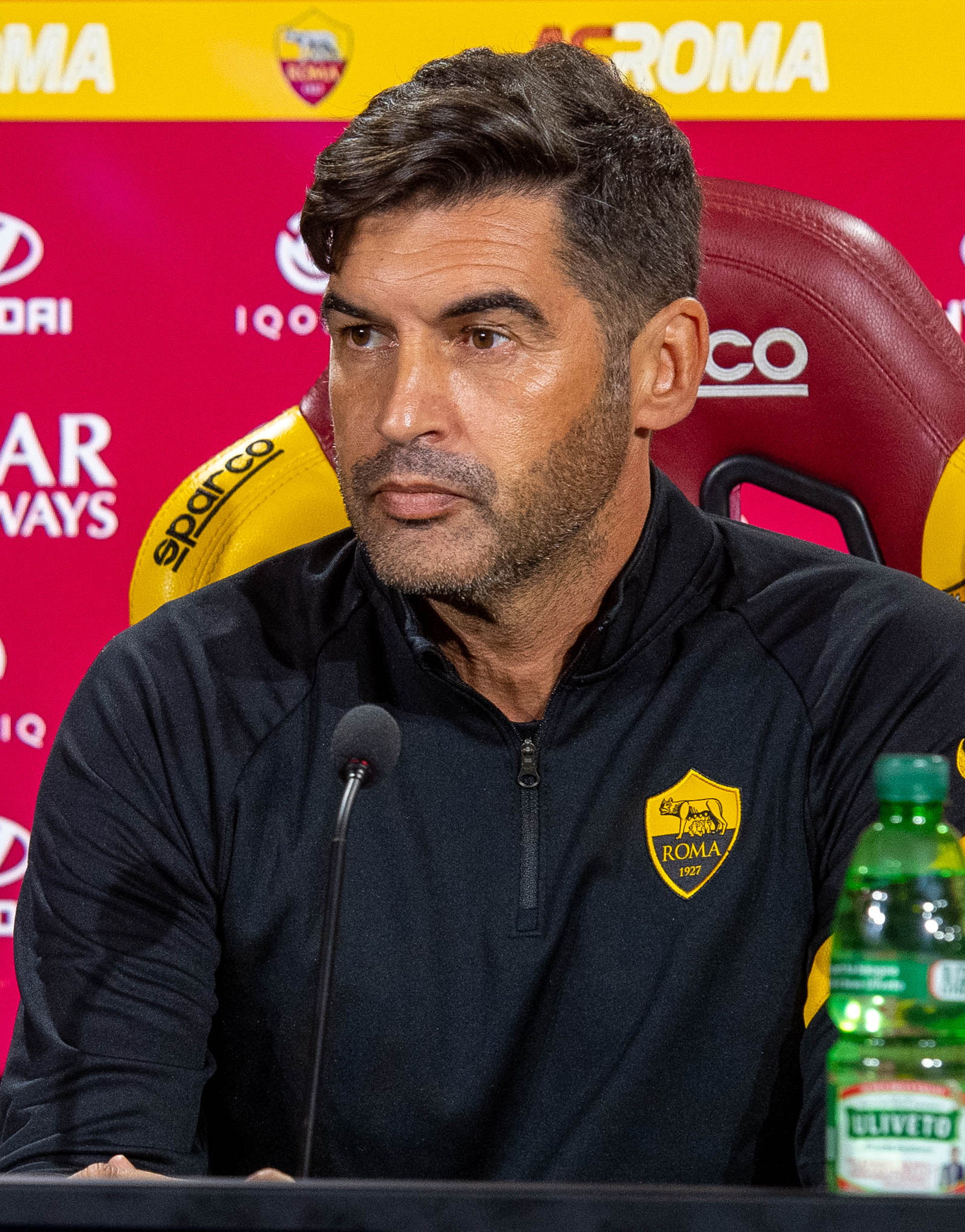
Fonseca with Roma in 2020

On 11 June 2019, Fonseca was appointed manager of Roma. He led the side to the fifth place in the Serie A in his first season, as well as the semi-finals of the subsequent Europa League. He announced his departure in May 2021.

Immediately after leaving Roma, Fonseca was director Fabio Paratici's top choice to be manager of Tottenham Hotspur, but the advanced negotiations were scrapped on 17 June 2021, allegedly due to tax issues. However, in an interview with The Daily Telegraph in September, the former revealed that the main reason for this was that the latter wanted to hire a more defensive-minded coach. In October, he was interviewed by Newcastle United following their Saudi-led takeover, before the interest shifted to Unai Emery and Eddie Howe; his name was then linked to a third English club, Aston Villa.

=== Lille ===
On 29 June 2022, Fonseca signed a two-year contract with French Ligue 1 club Lille. He made his debut on 7 August in a 4–1 home win over Auxerre. On 9 October, his team defeated Derby du Nord rivals Lens 1–0 also at the Stade Pierre-Mauroy. One of the best attacking sides in the first half of that season, they played an open 4–2–3–1 formation with Benjamin André, André Gomes or Angel Gomes being deployed as central midfielders behind playmaker Rémy Cabella and lone striker Jonathan David. Following a 4–3 home victory against Monaco on 23 October, only Lyon and Paris Saint-Germain had more possession in the domestic league.

In the 2023–24 campaign, Lille finished fourth after a 2–2 draw with Nice on the final matchday, thereby missing out on direct Champions League qualification. He left on 5 June 2024 by mutual consent.

=== AC Milan ===
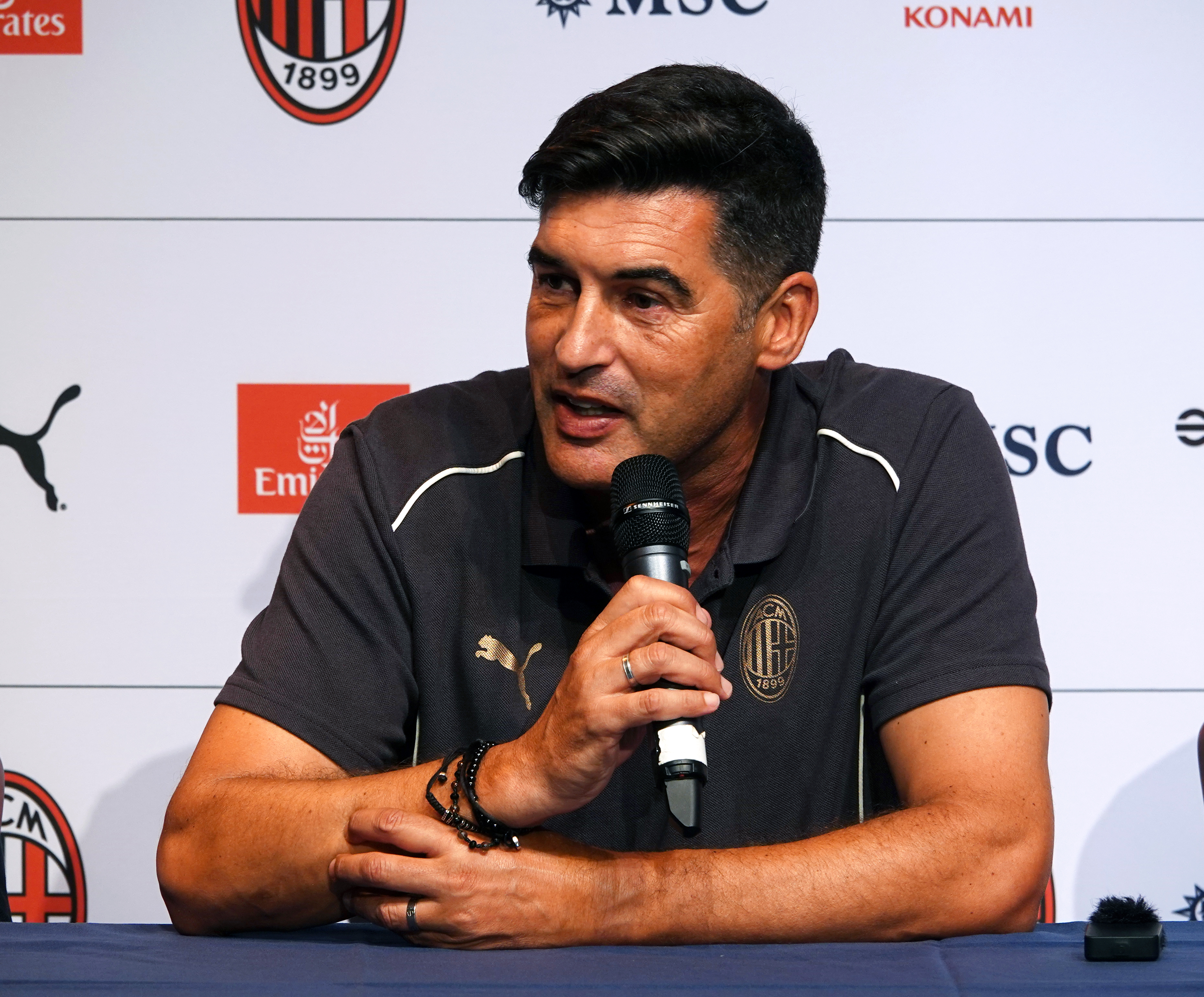
Fonseca in a press conference as AC Milan manager

On 13 June 2024, Fonseca was appointed as the new head coach of AC Milan, agreeing to a three-year deal as of 1 July. After a bad start in the season and rumours of imminent dismissal, he oversaw a 2–1 victory against Inter Milan in the Derby della Madonnina on 22 September. Ahead of the match, he experimented with the lineup, choosing 4–4–2 and 4–2–4 for defence and attack, respectively; it was also the first time the club had defeated this opposition in two years, ending a six-game losing streak.

Fonseca was sacked on 29 December 2024, with the team in eighth position.

=== Lyon ===
On 31 January 2025, Fonseca returned to the French top tier with Lyon. On 2 March, he aggressively confronted Benoît Millot at the end of a 2–1 home win over Brest, his head making contact with the referee; he was sent off for his actions and, the following day (his 52nd birthday), handed a suspension until 30 November that included the impossibility of sitting on his team's bench or entering their dressing room until 15 September.

Fonseca led the side to fourth place in his only full season, securing qualification for the Champions League. They were eliminated by Fenerbahçe in the play-off round 3–2 on aggregate.

=== Sporting CP ===
On 4 November 2026, Fonseca agreed to a contract at Sporting until June 2030.

== Managerial style ==
=== Tactics ===
At Shakhtar, Roma and Lille, Fonseca preferred a 4–2–3–1 formation and an emphasis on dominating possession. In these teams, the player behind the centre-forward played as a second striker; Henrikh Mkhitaryan achieved 13 goals for Roma in 2020–21 from that position.

In an interview for French media RMC about his Lille debut, Fonseca described his managerial style as "an offensive play in order to overcome the opponent, to settle in the opponent's half and to create many scoring chances."

=== Influences ===
Speaking in 2021, Fonseca mentioned three coaches which influenced his philosophy and style: ‘At this moment, I can highlight Maurizio Sarri and Pep Guardiola as the coaches I admire the most because they are bold, they have their own ideas, they are brave enough to play their own game and attack. Now, we can’t forget that José Mourinho has marked a generation of coaches in Portugal and marked Portuguese football. He completely changed the mindset of Portuguese coaches and he’s obviously been a great influence.’

== Personal life ==
Fonseca had a son and a daughter with his first wife. On 29 May 2018, he married Ukrainian television personality and producer Katerina Ostroushko (born 1991) at Lake Como, Italy; their son was born the same year. The family escaped Kyiv after the 2022 Russian invasion, travelling for 30 hours to Romania.

== Managerial statistics ==
As of match played 21 November 2026

Managerial record by team and tenure
Team	Nat	From	To	Record							
Team	Nat	From	To	G	W	D	L	GF	GA	GD	Win %
1º Dezembro	(Portugal)	1 July 2007	30 June 2008	34	13	11	10	39	32	+7	38.24
Odivelas	(Portugal)	30 June 2008	1 July 2009	35	11	10	14	44	46	−2	31.43
Pinhalnovense	(Portugal)	1 July 2009	7 June 2011	72	33	21	18	98	68	+30	45.83
Aves	(Portugal)	7 June 2011	30 May 2012	38	16	16	6	49	29	+20	42.11
Paços de Ferreira	(Portugal)	30 May 2012	9 June 2013	41	22	13	6	62	38	+24	53.66
Porto	(Portugal)	10 June 2013	5 March 2014	37	21	9	7	69	31	+38	56.76
Paços de Ferreira	(Portugal)	10 June 2014	1 July 2015	39	14	12	13	58	53	+5	35.90
Braga	(Portugal)	1 July 2015	31 May 2016	57	29	15	13	90	58	+32	50.88
Shakhtar Donetsk	(Ukraine)	31 May 2016	11 June 2019	139	103	19	17	295	112	+183	74.10
Roma	(Italy)	11 June 2019	30 June 2021	102	53	21	28	193	141	+52	51.96
Lille	(France)	29 June 2022	5 June 2024	90	47	25	18	159	90	+69	52.22
Milan	(Italy)	1 July 2024	29 December 2024	24	12	6	6	44	27	+17	50.00
Lyon	(France)	31 January 2025	4 November 2026	83	47	12	24	155	100	+55	56.63
Sporting CP	(Portugal)	4 November 2026	present	2	2	0	0	5	0	+5	100.00
Career Total				793	422	191	180	1,358	825	+533	53.22

== Honours ==
=== Manager ===
Porto

- Supertaça Cândido de Oliveira: 2013

Braga

- Taça de Portugal: 2015–16

Shakhtar Donetsk

- Ukrainian Premier League: 2016–17, 2017–18, 2018–19
- Ukrainian Cup: 2016–17, 2017–18, 2018–19
- Ukrainian Super Cup: 2017

Individual

- Ukrainian Premier League Best Coach: 2016–17
