= Pedro Santos (footballer, born 1988) =

Portuguese footballer (born 1988)

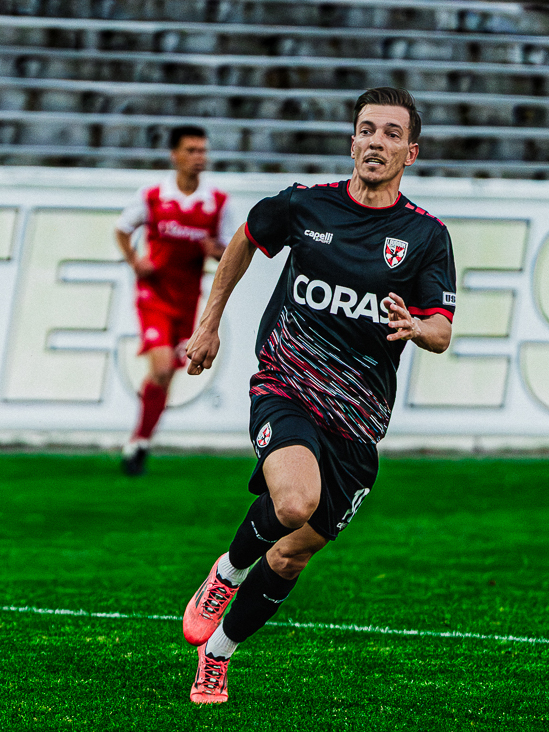
- Santos with Loudoun United in 2026

Personal information
- Full name: Pedro Miguel Martins Santos
- Date of birth: 22 April 1988 (age 38)
- Place of birth: Lisbon, Portugal
- Height: 1.68 m (5 ft 6 in)
- Positions: Winger; full-back

Team information
- Current team: Loudoun United
- Number: 10

Youth career
- 1996–1997: Sporting CP
- 1997–2000: ADCEO
- 2000–2002: Sporting CP
- 2002–2007: Casa Pia

Senior career*
Years	Team	Apps	(Gls)
2007–2010	Casa Pia	39	(25)
2010–2012	Leixões	41	(5)
2012–2013	Vitória Setúbal	28	(4)
2013–2017	Braga	76	(18)
2013	→ Astra Giurgiu (loan)	2	(1)
2014	→ Rio Ave (loan)	14	(0)
2017–2022	Columbus Crew	155	(23)
2023–2024	D.C. United	51	(4)
2025–	Loudoun United	41	(1)

International career
2007	Portugal U19	2	(0)
- * Club domestic league appearances and goals as of 12:20, 8 November 2026 (UTC)

Pedro Miguel Martins Santos (born 22 April 1988) is a Portuguese professional footballer who plays as a winger or full-back for USL Championship club Loudoun United.

After starting out at Casa Pia, he went on to amass Primeira Liga totals of 118 matches with 22 goals at the service of Vitória de Setúbal, Rio Ave and Braga. He represented Leixões in the Liga de Honra, and also competed professionally in Romania with Astra Giurgiu and the United States with Columbus Crew and D.C. United.

Santos represented Portugal at under-19 level.

== Club career ==
=== Early career ===
Born in Lisbon, Santos played youth football with three clubs, including Casa Pia A.C. from ages 13 to 19. He spent his first seasons as a senior in the lower leagues, scoring a career-best 17 goals in 2009–10 to help the team promote to the third division.

Subsequently, Santos moved to the professionals after signing with Leixões S.C. from the Liga de Honra. In his second year at the Estádio do Mar, he started in 23 of his 27 appearances (four goals) and the side finished in 11th position.

In the summer of 2012, Santos joined Vitória de Setúbal, making his debut in the Primeira Liga on 19 August of that year by coming as a 68th-minute substitute in a 2–2 away draw against C.D. Nacional, where he won a penalty and was also booked. His first goal in the league arrived on 4 November, when he played 79 minutes and helped the hosts defeat Sporting CP 2–1.

=== Braga ===
Santos moved to S.C. Braga also in the top tier in June 2013. Before the end of the transfer window he was loaned to Romanian club FC Astra Giurgiu, and scored to cap a 4–0 win at FC Oţelul Galaţi on his 15 September debut after coming on at half time for Gabriel Enache. Having made just three more appearances in all competitions, his loan was terminated in December.

On 8 January 2014, Santos was loaned again to Rio Ave F.C. in Braga's league until the end of the season alongside teammate Stanislav Kritsyuk. He played 22 total games for the team from Vila do Conde, and scored once to conclude a 3–1 away defeat of S.C. Covilhã on 26 January to qualify for the semi-finals of the Taça da Liga; he started the final defeat to S.L. Benfica and the loss to the same opponent in the Taça de Portugal decider too.

After returning to his parent club, Santos helped to consecutive fourth-place finishes and scored a total of 12 goals in the process. On 22 May 2016, he replaced Josué for the last minutes of regulation time in the national cup final (2–2 draw), and converted his penalty shootout attempt in a 4–2 victory at the Estádio Nacional.

=== Columbus Crew ===
==== 2017 season ====
On 7 August 2017, the 29-year-old Santos signed for Columbus Crew as a designated player, for a club record $2.3 million. He made his Major League Soccer debut 12 days later, playing 28 minutes in a 1–1 away draw against Orlando City SC. He finished his first season with two assists in 14 matches, with the Crew being eliminated in the Eastern Conference Finals by Toronto FC.

==== 2018 season ====
Santos scored his first goal for the team on 24 March 2018, concluding a 3–1 home victory over D.C. United. It was his only of the campaign, and he was sent off on 5 May in a goalless draw at Seattle Sounders FC for a kick to Alex Roldan's face. The Crew would go on to make the playoffs, ultimately losing to the New York Red Bulls in the Conference semi-finals 3–1 on aggregate.

Asked about his performance throughout the year, Santos replied: "Individually, it was not a poor season but I expect to score more goals. I always work for the team and I give my best for the team, to help my teammates. I think I had a good season but I was expecting to score more goals, for sure."

==== 2019 season ====
During the 2019 season, Santos recorded best professional figures of 11 goals from 33 games, while playing both as a winger and stepping in as an attacking midfielder for the injured playmaker Federico Higuaín, who had suffered an anterior cruciate ligament injury. On 28 July, he scored twice in a 3–2 away defeat of the New York Red Bulls. However, his side would struggle mightily due to injuries across their entire roster and would miss out on the playoffs.

==== 2020 season ====
Santos moved back to winger for the 2020 season, and scored eight goals and assisted on seven more in 26 matches across all competitions as his team won the MLS Cup for the first time since 2008, making him the first Portuguese player to earn a medal in the tournament; he missed the final against the Seattle Sounders due to a positive COVID-19 diagnosis, however. The day after the victory, his contract option for 2021 was exercised.

==== 2021 season ====
On 8 April 2021, Santos converted a penalty in a 4–0 victory over Real Estelí FC in the round of 16 of the CONCACAF Champions League, but injuries to incumbent left-back Milton Valenzuela forced him to cover that position for the majority of the campaign. On 29 May, playing in that position, he dished out two assists in a 2–1 win over Toronto.

In July 2021, Santos was fined an undisclosed amount for simulation against the New England Revolution. On 29 September, he helped the Crew win 2–0 against Cruz Azul in the Campeones Cup.

Following the return of Valenzuela, Santos was pushed higher up the pitch, resulting in a one-goal, two-assist performance in a 4–0 victory against Inter Miami CF on 16 October. In December, he signed an extension with an option for 2023.

==== 2022 season ====
With Columbus losing their first-choice left-back to a free transfer over the off-season, Santos became the starter, with his lone goal coming from a free kick against D.C. United on 30 April. At the end of the season, he was not retained and thus became a free agent.

=== D.C. United ===
On 21 November 2022, it was announced that Santos had signed a two-year deal with D.C. United. He scored his first goal with his new club the following 24 June, helping the hosts to defeat FC Cincinnati 3–0.

Santos was not offered a new contract at the end of the 2024 campaign.

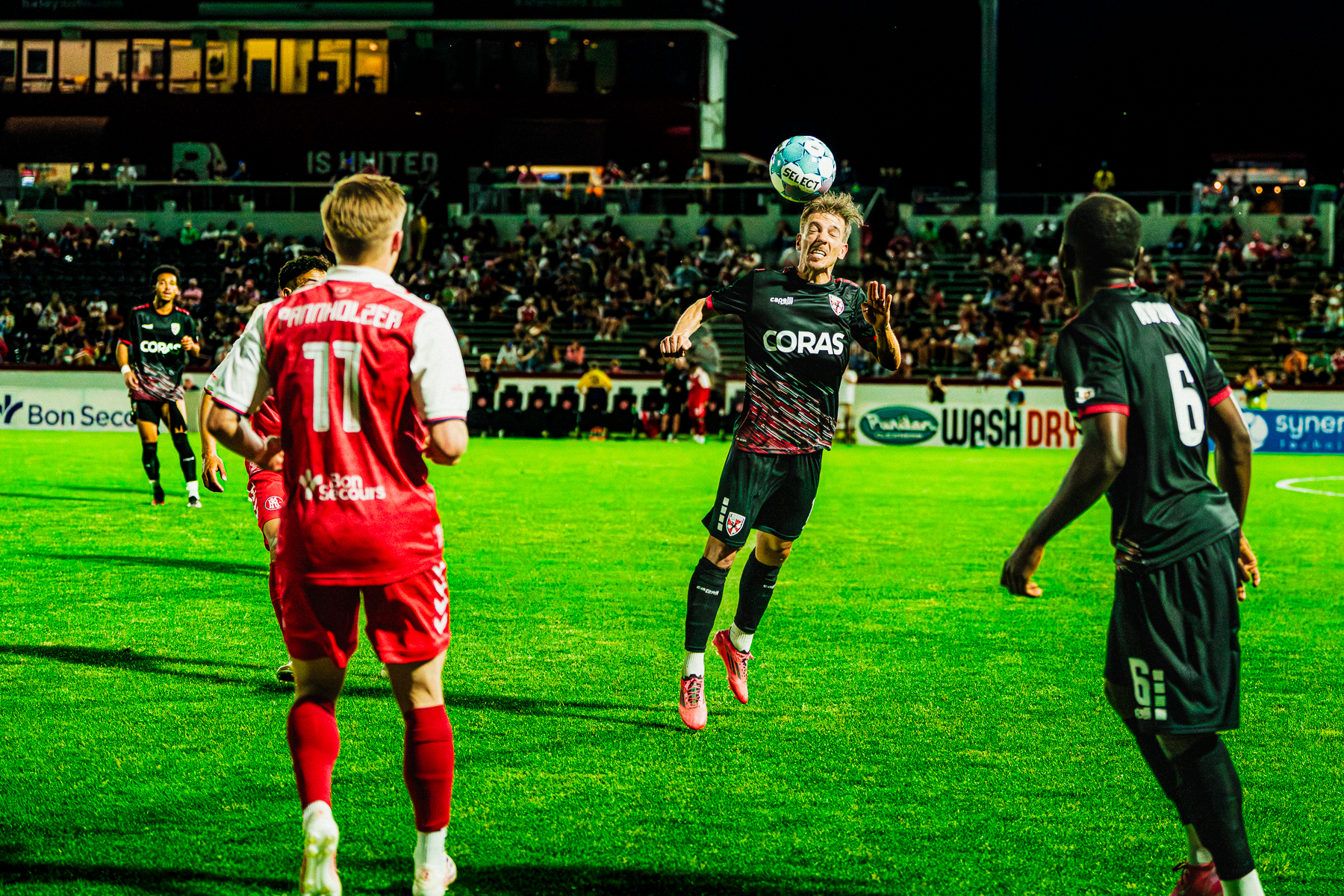
Santos (center) in action for Loudoun United against Richmond Kickers in April 2026

=== Later career ===
Santos became a coach in 2024 for youth club Virginia Revolution. For the 2025 season, he joined Loudoun United FC of the USL Championship, first on a 25-day contract then for the remainder of the year, while still remaining employed by the Revolution in that managerial role.

== International career ==
Santos earned two caps for the Portugal under-19 team, in as many friendlies against Spain in March 2007.

== Style of play ==
A versatile player, Santos is capable of playing on either wing, cutting inside from the right or advancing down the line on the left, and has also been deployed as an attacking midfielder and a left-back. He is known for his "magic" left foot, which allows him to deliver a variety of passes and crosses. While playing as a more attack-minded full-back, he is recognized for his positional awareness, work rate and willingness to track back after making overlapping runs.

Jacob Myers of The Columbus Dispatch described Santos during his time with the Columbus Crew as "one of the Crew’s hardest workers on both sides of the ball," noting that "he covers a lot of ground with a high motor and isn’t afraid to go in for a tackle." However, the former also observed that the latter "has shown a proclivity to dribble into defenders and lose the ball."

== Career statistics ==
As of 29 October 2024

Club	Season	League			Domestic Cup (Note: Includes Taça de Portugal, Cupa României and U.S. Open Cup)		League Cup (Note: All appearances in Taça da Liga and MLS Cup playoffs)		Continental (Note: All appearances in UEFA Europa League and CONCACAF Champions League)		Other		Total	
Club	Season	Division	Apps	Goals	Apps	Goals	Apps	Goals	Apps	Goals	Apps	Goals	Apps	Goals
Casa Pia	2008–09	Terceira Divisão	14	8	1	0	–		–		–		15	8
Casa Pia	2009–10	Terceira Divisão	25	17	3	0	–		–		–		28	17
Casa Pia	Total		39	25	4	0	0	0	0	0	0	0	43	25
Leixões	2010–11	Liga de Honra	14	1	2	0	2	0	–		–		18	1
Leixões	2011–12	Liga de Honra	27	4	3	0	1	0	–		–		31	4
Leixões	2012–13	Segunda Liga	0	0	0	0	2	1	–		–		2	1
Leixões	Total		41	5	5	0	5	1	0	0	0	0	51	6
Vitória Setúbal	2012–13	Primeira Liga	28	4	2	0	4	0	–		–		34	4
Braga	2013–14	Primeira Liga	0	0	0	0	0	0	0	0	–		0	0
Braga	2014–15	Primeira Liga	26	5	4	0	3	0	–		–		33	5
Braga	2015–16	Primeira Liga	23	7	7	1	3	2	8	0	–		41	10
Braga	2016–17	Primeira Liga	27	6	2	2	3	1	5	0	1 (Note: Appearance in Supertaça Cândido de Oliveira)	0	38	9
Braga	2017–18	Primeira Liga	0	0	0	0	0	0	2	0	–		2	0
Braga	Total		76	18	13	3	9	3	15	0	1	0	114	24
Astra Giurgiu (loan)	2013–14	Liga I	2	1	2	0	–		0	0	–		4	1
Rio Ave (loan)	2013–14	Primeira Liga	14	0	4	0	4	1	–		–		22	1
Columbus Crew	2017	Major League Soccer	9	0	0	0	5	0	–		–		14	0
Columbus Crew	2018	Major League Soccer	30	1	0	0	3	0	–		–		33	1
Columbus Crew	2019	Major League Soccer	33	11	2	0	–		–		–		35	11
Columbus Crew	2020	Major League Soccer	22	6	–		3	2	–		1 (Note: Appearance in MLS is Back Tournament knockout round)	0	26	8
Columbus Crew	2021	Major League Soccer	32	4	–		–		4	1	1 (Note: Appearance in Campeones Cup)	0	37	5
Columbus Crew	2022	Major League Soccer	29	1	0	0	–		–		–		29	1
Columbus Crew	Total		155	23	2	0	11	2	4	1	2	0	174	26
D.C. United	2023	Major League Soccer	21	1	0	0	–		2 (Note: Appearances in Leagues Cup)	0	–		23	1
D.C. United	2024	Major League Soccer	30	3	0	0	–		1	0	–		31	3
D.C. United	Total		51	4	0	0	–		3	0	–		54	4
Career total			406	80	32	3	33	7	22	1	3	0	495	91

== Honours ==
Casa Pia

- Terceira Divisão: 2009–10

Braga

- Taça de Portugal: 2015–16

Astra Giurgiu

- Cupa României: 2013–14

Columbus Crew

- MLS Cup: 2020
- Campeones Cup: 2021

Individual

- SJPF Segunda Liga Player of the Month: November 2011
- SJPF Segunda Liga Young Player of the Month: November 2011
