= 2016 Taça de Portugal final =

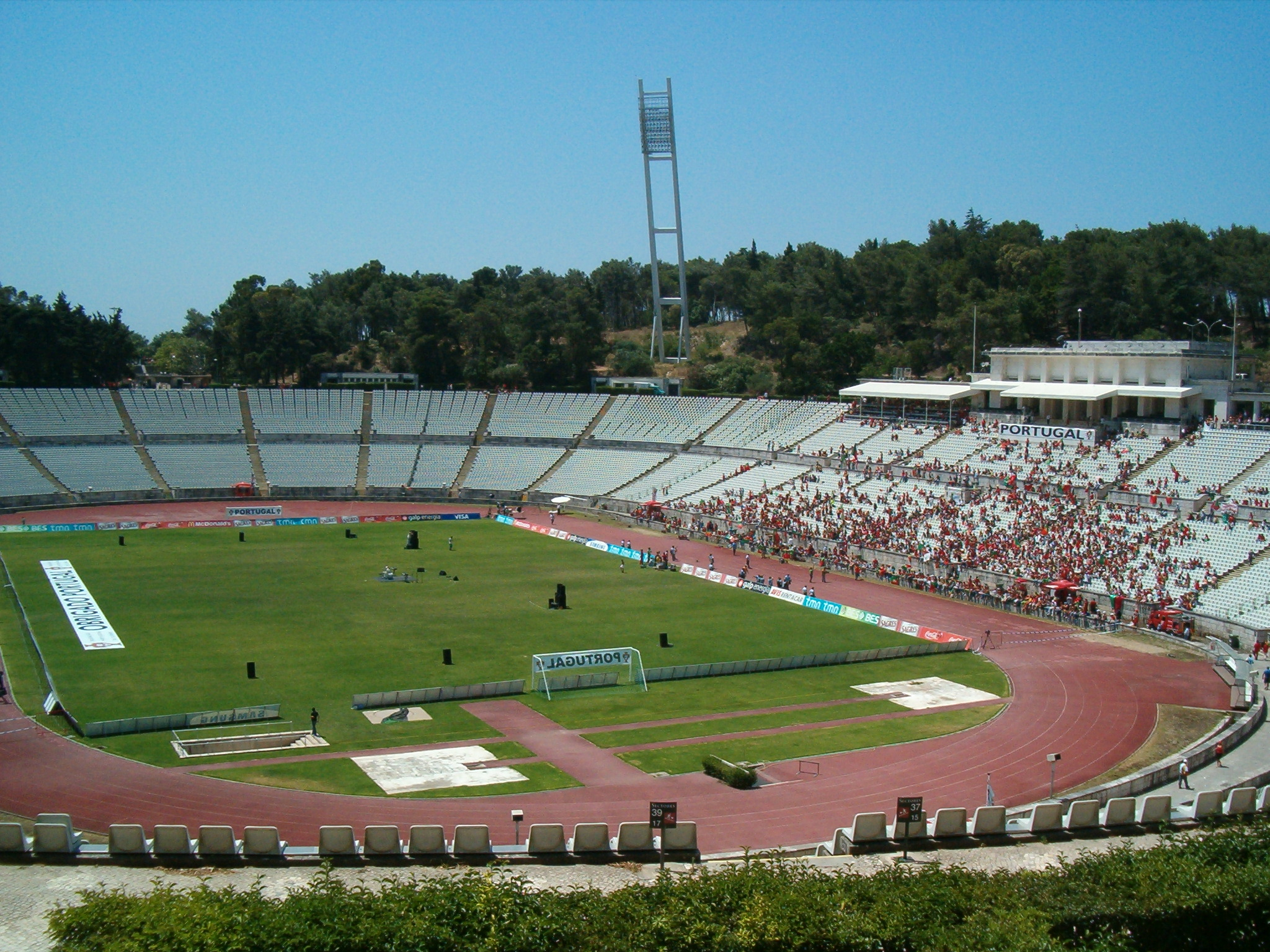
- Estádio Nacional
- Event: 2015–16 Taça de Portugal
Porto	Braga
2	2
- After extra time Braga won 4–2 on penalties
- Date: 22 May 2016
- Venue: Estádio Nacional, Oeiras
- Man of the Match: André Silva (Porto)
- Fair Player of the Match: Danilo (Porto)
- Referee: Artur Soares Dias (Porto)
- Attendance: 35,390

The 2016 Taça de Portugal final was the last match of the 2015–16 Taça de Portugal, which decided the winner of the 76th season of the Taça de Portugal. It was played on 22 May 2016 at the Estádio Nacional in Oeiras, between Porto and Braga.

Braga beat Porto 4–2 in a penalty shoot-out, after a 2–2 draw persisted through extra time, and won their second title in the competition, 50 years after their maiden triumph in the 1965–66 season.

As the winners, Braga earned the right to play the 2016 Supertaça Cândido de Oliveira against 2015–16 Primeira Liga winners Benfica, and also qualified for the 2016–17 UEFA Europa League group stage. However, as their league placing (fourth) also secured entry to this competition via the third qualifying round, this berth was transferred to the sixth-placed team (Rio Ave).

== Route to the final ==
Note: In the table, the score of the finalist is given first (H = home; A = away).

Porto				Round	Braga
Opponent	Result			Round	Opponent	Result
Varzim	2–0 (A)			Third round	Académico de Viseu	3–0 (A)
Angrense	2–0 (A)			Fourth round	Farense	1–0 (a.e.t.) (A)
Feirense	1–0 (A)			Fifth round	Sporting CP	4–3 (a.e.t.) (H)
Boavista	1–0 (A)			Quarter-finals	Arouca	2–0 (H)
Opponent	Agg.	1st leg	2nd leg		Opponent	Agg.	1st leg	2nd leg
Gil Vicente	5–0	3–0 (A)	2–0 (H)	Semi-finals	Rio Ave	1–0	1–0 (H)	0–0 (A)

== Match ==
=== Details ===
22 May 2016
17:15 WEST (UTC+01:00)

Porto	2–2 (a.e.t.)	Braga
Silva 61', 90+1'		Fonte 12'; Josué 58'
Penalties
Layún (penalty scored); Herrera (penalty missed); Neves (penalty scored); M. Pereira (penalty missed)	2–4	(penalty scored) P. Santos; (penalty scored) Stojiljković; (penalty scored) Hassan; (penalty scored) Marcelo Goiano

Estádio Nacional, Oeiras
Attendance: 35,390
Referee: Artur Soares Dias (Porto)

Porto	Braga

GK	1	(Brazil) Helton (c)
RB	2	(Uruguay) Maxi Pereira
CB	63	(Nigeria) Chidozie Awaziem		(substituted off) 46'
CB	5	(Spain) Iván Marcano
LB	21	(Mexico) Miguel Layún
CM	22	(Portugal) Danilo Pereira
CM	13	(Portugal) Sérgio Oliveira		(substituted off) 74'
RW	7	(Portugal) Silvestre Varela		(substituted off) 79'
AM	16	(Mexico) Héctor Herrera
LW	8	(Algeria) Yacine Brahimi
CF	19	(Portugal) André Silva	(yellow card) 87'
Substitutes:
GK	12	(Spain) Iker Casillas
DF	3	(Netherlands) Bruno Martins Indi
MF	6	(Portugal) Rúben Neves		(substituted on) 46'
MF	15	(Brazil) Evandro
MF	20	(Portugal) André André		(substituted on) 74'
FW	9	(Cameroon) Vincent Aboubakar		(substituted on) 79'
FW	17	(Mexico) Jesús Corona
Manager:
(Portugal) José Peseiro

GK	28	(Portugal) José Marafona	(yellow card) 102'
RB	15	(Brazil) Baiano
CB	24	(Portugal) Ricardo Ferreira		(substituted off) 77'
CB	6	(Portugal) André Pinto (c)	(yellow card) 87'
LB	87	(Brazil) Marcelo Goiano
RM	27	(Portugal) Josué		(substituted off) 84'
CM	8	(Brazil) Luíz Carlos
CM	63	(Brazil) Mauro	(yellow card) 114'
LM	18	(Portugal) Rafa Silva
CF	20	(Egypt) Ahmed Hassan
CF	17	(Portugal) Rui Fonte		(substituted off) 60'
Substitutes:
GK	92	(Brazil) Matheus
DF	5	(France) Willy Boly		(substituted on) 77'
DF	16	(Brazil) Djavan
MF	35	(Montenegro) Nikola Vukčević
FW	19	(Serbia) Nikola Stojiljković		(substituted on) 60'
FW	23	(Portugal) Pedro Santos		(substituted on) 84'
FW	30	(Brazil) Alan
Manager:
(Portugal) Paulo Fonseca

Man of the Match:
André Silva (Porto)

Assistant referees:
Rui Tavares (Porto)
João Silva (Porto)
Fourth official:
Bruno Rodrigues (Porto)
Additional assistant referees:
Hugo Miguel (Lisbon)
Tiago Martins (Lisbon)
Reserve assistant referee:
Alfredo Braga (Braga)

Match rules

- 90 minutes.
- 30 minutes of extra time if necessary.
- Penalty shoot-out if scores still level.
- Seven named substitutes, of which up to three may be used.

=== Statistics ===
First half
	Porto	Braga
Goals scored	0	1
Total shots	3	2
Shots on target	0	1
Ball possession	59%	41%
Corner kicks	6	0
Fouls committed	5	9
Offsides	0	0
Yellow cards	0	0
Red cards	0	0

Second half
	Porto	Braga
Goals scored	2	1
Total shots	8	5
Shots on target	4	1
Ball possession	63%	37%
Corner kicks	4	2
Fouls committed	9	4
Offsides	1	1
Yellow cards	1	1
Red cards	0	0

Extra time
	Porto	Braga
Goals scored	0	0
Total shots	2	0
Shots on target	0	0
Ball possession	62%	38%
Corner kicks	3	0
Fouls committed	8	6
Offsides	0	0
Yellow cards	0	2
Red cards	0	0

Overall
	Porto	Braga
Goals scored	2	2
Total shots	13	7
Shots on target	4	2
Ball possession	62%	38%
Corner kicks	13	2
Fouls committed	22	19
Offsides	1	1
Yellow cards	1	3
Red cards	0	0

== Broadcasting ==
The final was broadcast in Portugal on television by TVI and by SportTV (on SportTV 1), which holds the broadcasting rights for the whole competition.

== See also ==
- 2015–16 FC Porto season
- 2016 Taça da Liga final
