= Nuno Valente (footballer, born 1991) =

Portuguese footballer

Personal information
- Full name: Nuno Daniel Costeira Valente
- Date of birth: 22 November 1991 (age 34)
- Place of birth: Adaúfe, Portugal
- Height: 1.74 m (5 ft 9 in)
- Position: Midfielder

Youth career
- 2003–2004: Braga
- 2004–2005: Bairro da Misericórdia
- 2005–2010: Braga

Senior career*
Years	Team	Apps	(Gls)
2010–2015	Braga	1	(0)
2010–2011	→ Vizela (loan)	11	(2)
2011	→ Covilhã (loan)	2	(0)
2011–2012	→ Vizela (loan)	29	(2)
2012–2015	Braga B	107	(16)
2015–2018	Arouca	79	(7)
2018–2020	Vitória Setúbal	41	(2)
2020–2022	Varzim	38	(1)
2022–2023	Paris 13 Atletico	6	(0)
2023	Oliveirense	15	(0)
2023–2025	Trofense	43	(6)
Total		372	(36)

International career
2008	Portugal U18	1	(1)
- * Club domestic league appearances and goals

Nuno Daniel Costeira Valente (born 22 November 1991) is a Portuguese former professional footballer who played as a midfielder.

== Club career ==
Born in Adaúfe, Braga District, Valente came through the ranks of S.C. Braga. He made his senior debut on loan to F.C. Vizela in the third division in 2010, and the following January he was lent to S.C. Covilhã of the Segunda Liga. He made his professional bow in one of two substitute appearances for the latter, replacing Niamien Rodolph Amessan for the last five minutes of a 1–0 away win against Leixões SC.

After being told that he was not in the manager's plans, Valente was loaned again to Vizela in 2011. He subsequently represented Braga's reserves in the second tier, making just one first-team appearance in the Primeira Liga on 5 April 2014, the final 18 minutes of a 2–0 away victory over S.C. Olhanense in place of Rodrigo Battaglia. In his final season in the Minho Province he scored a career-best ten goals for the B team, starting with two in a 4–2 home defeat of Atlético Clube de Portugal on 21 September 2014.

Valente joined fellow top-flight club F.C. Arouca on 22 June 2015, on a three-year contract. In his third match on 30 August, he scored his first goal in the competition to seal a 1–1 draw at F.C. Paços de Ferreira.

Free agent Valente signed a three-year deal with Vitória de Setúbal of the same league on 29 May 2018. He netted twice in 23 games in his debut campaign, helping to a 13th-place finish.

Valente moved to second-tier Varzim S.C. in November 2020. He scored his only goal on 7 August 2021 to open the 2–2 home draw against G.D. Chaves, being relegated in 2022.

On 13 June 2022, aged 30, Valente signed for Championnat National side Paris 13 Atletico.
