= Artur Fonte =

Portuguese footballer

Personal information
- Full name: Artur Alberto Ferreira Fonte
- Date of birth: 8 August 1959 (age 67)
- Place of birth: Lisbon, Portugal
- Height: 1.69 m (5 ft 7 in)
- Position: Left-back

Youth career
- 1973–1978: Sporting CP

Senior career*
Years	Team	Apps	(Gls)
1978–1980	Vila Real		
1980–1982	Penafiel	55	(1)
1982–1983	Vitória Setúbal	6	(0)
1983–1984	Penafiel	31	(0)
1984–1988	Belenenses	99	(2)
1988–1992	Penafiel	99	(0)
1992	Atlético Malveira	4	(0)
Total		294	(3)

International career
1977–1978	Portugal U18	16	(0)
1979	Portugal U20	4	(0)
- * Club domestic league appearances and goals

Artur Alberto Ferreira Fonte (born 8 August 1959) is a Portuguese former footballer who played as a left-back.

== Club career ==
Born in Lisbon, Fonte spent 12 seasons in the Primeira Liga, playing 290 matches for F.C. Penafiel (three spells), C.F. Os Belenenses and Vitória de Setúbal. He made his debut in the competition on 23 August 1980 whilst at the service of the first club, in a 1–0 home win against C.S. Marítimo.

Also with Penafiel, in the 1988–89 campaign, Fonte appeared in a career-best 35 games to help his team to the 14th position. He retired at the age of 33, after one year in the lower leagues.

== International career ==
Fonte represented Portugal at the 1978 UEFA European Under-18 Championship and the 1979 FIFA World Youth Championship.

== Personal life ==
Fonte's sons, José and Rui, were also professional footballers.
