= Rui Fonte =

Portuguese footballer

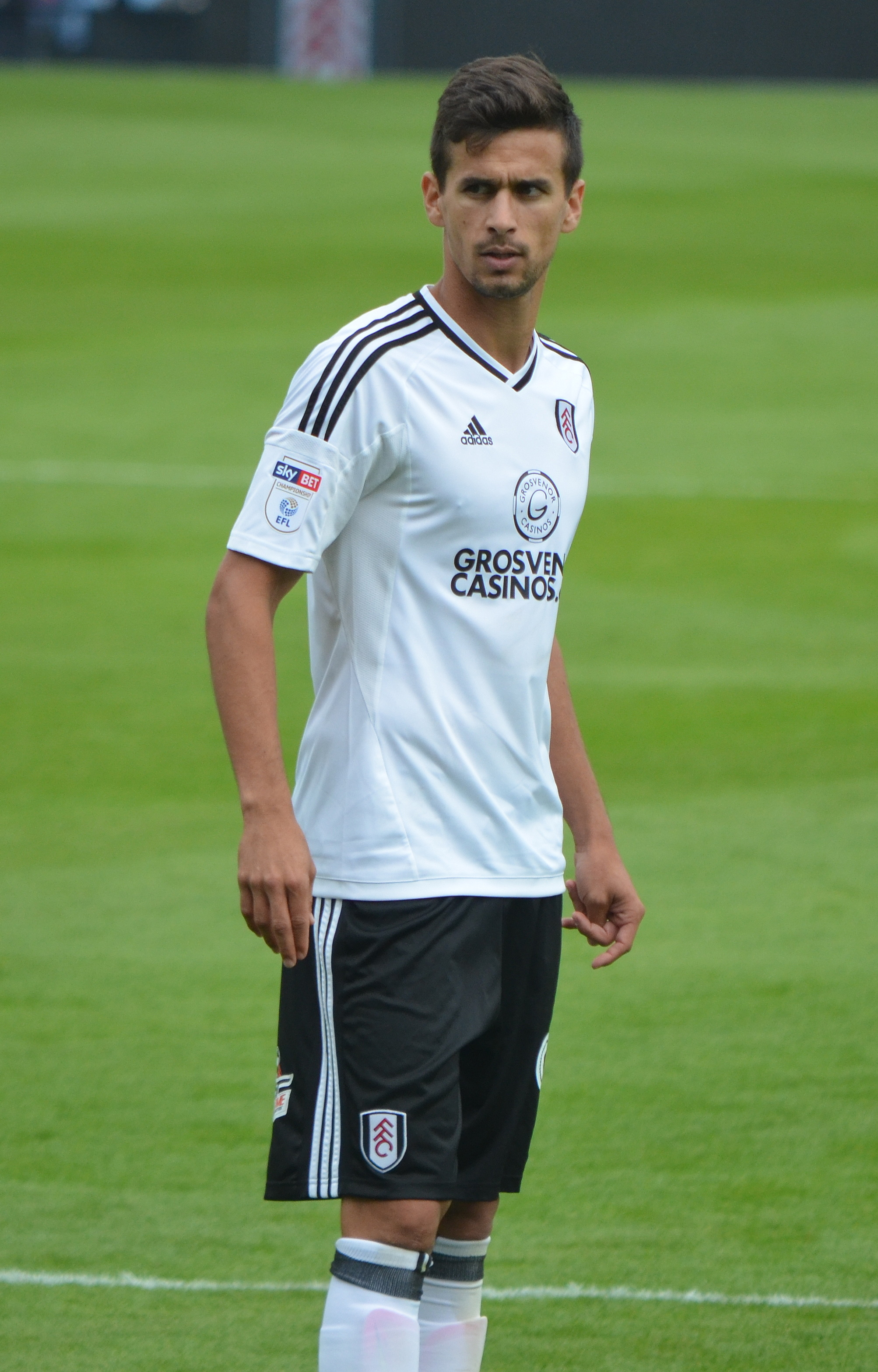
- Fonte playing for Fulham in 2017

Personal information
- Full name: Rui Pedro da Rocha Fonte
- Date of birth: 23 April 1990 (age 36)
- Place of birth: Penafiel, Portugal
- Height: 1.81 m (5 ft 11 in)
- Position: Forward

Youth career
- 1998–1999: Sacavenense
- 1999–2006: Sporting CP
- 2006–2009: Arsenal

Senior career*
Years	Team	Apps	(Gls)
2008–2009	Arsenal	0	(0)
2009	→ Crystal Palace (loan)	10	(0)
2009–2011	Sporting CP	0	(0)
2009–2010	→ Vitória Setúbal (loan)	13	(0)
2010–2011	→ Espanyol B (loan)	22	(8)
2010–2011	→ Espanyol (loan)	11	(0)
2011–2013	Espanyol	29	(1)
2013–2015	Benfica B	26	(18)
2013–2016	Benfica	0	(0)
2015	→ Belenenses (loan)	13	(2)
2015–2016	→ Braga (loan)	15	(4)
2016–2017	Braga	28	(12)
2017–2019	Fulham	27	(3)
2018–2019	→ Lille (loan)	18	(1)
2019–2021	Braga	31	(4)
2021–2022	Estoril	23	(4)
2022–2023	Famalicão	18	(1)
2023–2025	Paços Ferreira	64	(11)
Total		348	(69)

International career
2005–2006	Portugal U16	12	(3)
2006–2007	Portugal U17	13	(2)
2008	Portugal U18	5	(3)
2008–2009	Portugal U19	12	(8)
2010	Portugal U20	5	(2)
2008–2012	Portugal U21	22	(8)
- * Club domestic league appearances and goals

Rui Pedro da Rocha Fonte (born 23 April 1990) is a Portuguese former professional footballer who played as a forward.

After signing for Arsenal as a 16-year-old, he only made one competitive appearance for the club before signing with Sporting CP, who loaned him several times for the duration of his contract, including at Espanyol, who acquired him permanently in 2011. He subsequently joined Benfica, where injury problems saw him feature sparingly until his release; with his next team, Braga, he notably won the 2016 Taça de Portugal.

All youth levels comprised, Fonte earned 69 caps for Portugal and scored 26 goals.

== Club career ==
=== Early years and Arsenal ===
Fonte was born in Penafiel, and joined Sporting CP's youth system at only 9. In 2006 he signed a three-year deal with Arsenal, with a clause stating he was to return to his previous club if the English did not extend the contract beyond the original period.

A regular member of Arsenal's reserves, Fonte made his debut for the first team in a friendly against Barnet in the 2008 pre-season. He made his competitive debut for the Gunners as a substitute for Carlos Vela in a League Cup match against Wigan Athletic on 11 November 2008, a 3–0 home win.

On 30 January 2009, Fonte joined Championship side Crystal Palace on a one-month loan, with his older brother José playing a big role in persuading club and player of each other's merits. He made his debut for his new team in a 0–1 home defeat to Blackpool on the following day, and his loan was subsequently extended until the end of the season; Palace were docked a point and fined £20,000 for fielding him in their final match, despite his loan having expired.

On 19 May 2009, it was announced that Arsenal had decided not to extend Fonte's three-year contract, and the player returned to Sporting. He spent the 2009–10 campaign on loan to Vitória de Setúbal, making his Primeira Liga debut on 17 August in a 0–0 home draw against Vitória de Guimarães (one minute played) and appearing sparingly as they barely escaped relegation; during his stint, he paid the wages of people connected to the organisation due to its severe economic problems.

=== Espanyol ===
Fonte played 2010–11 on loan to RCD Espanyol in Spain. He spent the vast majority of his spell with the reserves, his first La Liga appearances consisting of one minute in a 1–0 home victory over Sporting de Gijón on 5 December 2010, and ten in a 0–1 loss to Real Madrid also at the Estadi Cornellà-El Prat two months later.

On 14 July 2011, Fonte signed permanently for two years. On 17 January of the following year he scored his first official goal for the Pericos, in a 3–2 home defeat of CD Mirandés in the quarter-finals of the Copa del Rey; he repeated the feat in the second leg, albeit in a 2–1 and 4–4 aggregate defeat. In between, he scored his first goal in the league, closing the 3–0 home win over Granada CF.

=== Benfica ===
Fonte terminated his contract with Espanyol on 29 January 2013 and, on the next day, signed with S.L. Benfica on a five-and-a-half-year deal. He was initially assigned to the B side in the Segunda Liga, suffering a knee injury in his debut against C.F. União and being sidelined for the rest of the campaign.

In January 2015, Jorge Jesus confirmed that Fonte was promoted to the first team after the loan of Nélson Oliveira. His first competitive appearance took place on the 14th, as he played the first half of the 4–0 home win against F.C. Arouca in the third round of the Taça da Liga.

On 2 February 2015, Fonte, at the time top scorer for Benfica B with 17 goals in 21 matches, was loaned to C.F. Os Belenenses until the end of the season. For 2015–16, he moved to S.C. Braga also on loan.

=== Braga ===
On 16 December 2015, after having replaced Wilson Eduardo for the last 11 minutes of regulation time, Fonte scored the 4–3 winner for the hosts against Sporting, helping to oust his former club from the Taça de Portugal. The following 22 May, after being injured for nearly three months, he started in the final of the domestic cup, netting in a 2–2 draw against FC Porto (4–2 penalty shootout win).

Fonte agreed to a permanent three-year contract with Braga on 1 September 2016. He scored 11 goals during the campaign (15 overall), helping to a fifth-place finish.

=== Fulham ===
On 17 August 2017, Fonte transferred to Championship club Fulham after signing a three-year contract. He scored in his second league appearance, a 2–0 away victory over Ipswich Town.

Fonte joined Lille OSC from France on 31 August 2018 on a season-long loan, reuniting with his older brother José Fonte. His only goal for the eventual Ligue 1 runners-up came on 28 April 2019, in a 5–0 home defeat of Nîmes Olympique.

=== Return to Braga ===
Fonte returned to his homeland and Braga on 21 August 2019, signing a three-year deal. He spent the better part of the 2020–21 season on the sidelines, due to a cruciate ligament injury.

=== Estoril ===
On 31 August 2021, Fonte signed a one-year contract with a plus-one option with top-flight club G.D. Estoril Praia. He scored his first goal on 3 October in a 2–2 home draw against Gil Vicente FC, and his second was the only at B-SAD on 12 December.

=== Later career ===
Fonte alternated between the first and second tiers the following seasons, with F.C. Famalicão and F.C. Paços de Ferreira.

== International career ==
Fonte made his debut for the Portugal under-21s against Spain on 18 November 2008, scoring the first goal in a 4–1 victory. The following summer, he was part of the team that took silver in the Lusofonia Games, scoring a penalty in a 4–1 win over Angola on the final day.

On 31 March 2015, Fonte was called up to the full side for the first time, remaining on the bench in the 2–0 friendly defeat to Cape Verde in Estoril.

== Personal life ==
Fonte's older brother, José, was also a footballer – a defender, he spent most of his professional career in England, and the two were teammates at Sporting (youth), Crystal Palace and Lille.

Their father Artur played 12 seasons in the Portuguese top division.

== Career statistics ==
As of match played 30 June 2019

Appearances and goals by club, season and competition
Club	Season	League			National Cup		League Cup		Europe		Total	
Club	Season	Division	Apps	Goals	Apps	Goals	Apps	Goals	Apps	Goals	Apps	Goals
Arsenal	2008–09	Premier League	0	0	0	0	1	0	—		1	0
Crystal Palace (loan)	2008–09	Championship	10	0	0	0	0	0	—		10	0
Setúbal	2009–10	Primeira Liga	13	0	0	0	2	0	—		15	0
Espanyol	2010–11	La Liga	11	0	0	0	—		—		11	0
Espanyol	2011–12	La Liga	19	1	5	1	—		—		24	2
Espanyol	2012–13	La Liga	10	0	2	0	—		—		12	0
Espanyol	Total		40	1	7	1	—		0	0	47	2
Benfica B	2012–13	Segunda Liga	1	0	—		—		—		1	0
Benfica B	2013–14	Segunda Liga	4	1	—		—		—		4	1
Benfica B	2014–15	Segunda Liga	21	17	—		—		—		21	17
Benfica B	Total		26	18	0	0	0	0	0	0	26	18
Benfica	2014–15	Primeira Liga	0	0	0	0	1	0	—		1	0
Belenenses	2014–15	Primeira Liga	13	2	0	0	0	0	—		13	2
Braga	2015–16	Primeira Liga	15	4	3	2	3	2	7 (Note: Appearances in UEFA Europa League)	0	28	8
Braga	2016–17	Primeira Liga	26	11	2	1	5	2	4	0	37	14
Braga	2017–18	Primeira Liga	2	1	0	0	0	0	2	1	4	2
Braga	Total		43	16	5	3	8	4	13	1	69	24
Fulham	2017–18	Championship	27	3	1	0	0	0	—		28	3
Fulham	2018–19	Premier League	0	0	0	0	1	0	—		1	0
Lille (loan)	2018–19	Ligue 1	18	1	1	0	1	0	—		20	1
Career total			190	41	14	4	14	4	13	1	231	50

== Honours ==
Benfica

- Taça da Liga: 2014–15

Braga

- Taça de Portugal: 2015–16, 2020–21
- Taça da Liga: 2019–20

Fulham

- EFL Championship play-offs: 2018

Portugal U21

- Lusofonia Games silver medal: 2009
