= Alan (footballer, born 1979) =

Brazilian footballer

Personal information
- Full name: Alan Osório da Costa Silva
- Date of birth: 19 September 1979 (age 47)
- Place of birth: Salvador, Brazil
- Height: 1.80 m (5 ft 11 in)
- Position: Winger

Youth career
- 1998–1999: Ipatinga

Senior career*
Years	Team	Apps	(Gls)
2000–2001	Ipatinga		
2001–2005	Marítimo	109	(14)
2002–2003	Marítimo B	9	(0)
2005–2008	Porto	32	(2)
2007–2008	→ Vitória Guimarães (loan)	29	(1)
2008–2017	Braga	230	(34)
Total		409	(51)
- * Club domestic league appearances and goals

Alan Osório da Costa Silva (born 19 September 1979), known simply as Alan, is a Brazilian former professional footballer who played as a winger.

He amassed Primeira Liga totals of 400 matches and 51 goals over 16 seasons (best-ever for a foreign player), representing in the competition Marítimo, Porto, Vitória de Guimarães and Braga. He won two national championships with the second club, and the 2016 Taça de Portugal with the last.

== Club career ==
=== Marítimo ===
Alan was born in Salvador, Bahia. After starting professionally with Ipatinga Esporte Clube he moved overseas, joining Portuguese Primeira Liga club C.S. Marítimo in 2001–02 and playing 27 games in his debut season, but slightly fewer in the following.

In his third year, Alan scored nine league goals, notably one against Sporting CP in the sixth minute of added time in a 2–1 home win as the Madeiran team qualified for the UEFA Cup after finishing sixth. The next season, on 6 February 2005, he repeated the feat against the same opponent in another victory at the Estádio do Marítimo (3–0).

=== Porto ===
Alan joined FC Porto for 2005–06, sharing teams with established Portugal international Ricardo Quaresma, but still managed 24 league appearances in the campaign, although 14 as a substitute, scoring in a 3–0 home defeat of Rio Ave F.C. on 10 September 2005. In his second year he featured less prominently, being loaned to fellow top-division side Vitória S.C. for one season.

During 2007–08, Alan played regularly as the Guimarães team achieved a third-place in the domestic championship one year after promoting. He only missed one game and totalled 2,367 minutes, finding the net in the last fixture, a 4–0 home victory over C.F. Estrela da Amadora.

=== Braga ===
In June 2008, Alan was released by Porto and joined Vitória's Minho Province neighbours S.C. Braga on a three-year contract. On 23 October, he scored after an individual effort in a UEFA Cup 3–0 home win over Premier League's Portsmouth. He also featured in all the league matches as Braga finished fifth.

Alan fared even better the following season by scoring nine goals, again in 30 matches, as they managed a best-ever runner-up position. In August/September 2009, he notably scored against Sporting (2–1 away win) and his former club Porto (the only in a home victory).

Veteran Alan continued to be first choice for Braga in the following years. On 2 October 2012, he scored the second goal of a 2–0 away defeat of Galatasaray SK in the group stage of the UEFA Champions League. He added a brace in the competition's next matchday, but his side lost 3–2 at Manchester United after being 2–0 up.

On 13 April 2013, through a 45th-minute penalty, Alan scored the game's only goal against former employers Porto – reduced to ten players prior to that action – to help Braga to win the Taça da Liga, a first-ever for them. He contributed two appearances in the 2015–16 edition of the Taça de Portugal for the winners, netting in the round of 16 to help beat Sporting 4–3 in extra time; he remained unused in the final against Porto, a 4–2 penalty shootout victory.

Alan retired in June 2017 at age 37, remaining tied to his last club in directorial capacities.

== Career statistics ==
As of 28 January 2015

Club	Season	League			Cup		Other		Total	
Club	Season	Division	Apps	Goals	Apps	Goals	Apps	Goals	Apps	Goals
Marítimo	2001–02	Primeira Liga	27	1	6	0	2 (Note: Appearances in UEFA Cup)	0	35	1
Marítimo	2002–03	Primeira Liga	18	1	1	1	—		19	2
Marítimo	2003–04	Primeira Liga	34	9	2	0	—		36	9
Marítimo	2004–05	Primeira Liga	30	3	2	0	2 (Note: Appearances in UEFA Europa League)	0	34	3
Marítimo	Total		109	14	11	1	4	0	124	15
Porto	2005–06	Primeira Liga	24	1	3	0	4 (Note: Appearances in UEFA Champions League)	0	31	1
Porto	2006–07	Primeira Liga	8	1	2 (Note: Includes appearance in Supertaça Cândido de Oliveira)	0	2	0	12	1
Porto	Total		32	2	5	0	6	0	43	2
Vitória Guimarães	2007–08	Primeira Liga	29	1	5	0	—		34	1
Vitória Guimarães	Total		29	1	5	0	—		34	1
Braga	2008–09	Primeira Liga	30	3	4	0	12	1	46	4
Braga	2009–10	Primeira Liga	30	8	5	1	2	0	37	9
Braga	2010–11	Primeira Liga	27	5	5	1	19 (Note: Appearances in UEFA Europa League and UEFA Champions League)	3	51	9
Braga	2011–12	Primeira Liga	23	3	4	0	10	1	37	4
Braga	2012–13	Primeira Liga	26	5	8	2	8	5	42	12
Braga	2013–14	Primeira Liga	24	6	9	3	2	0	35	9
Braga	2014–15	Primeira Liga	13	0	4	3	—		17	3
Braga	Total		173	29	39	10	53	10	265	49
Career total			343	46	60	11	63	10	466	67

== Honours ==
Porto

- Primeira Liga: 2005–06, 2006–07
- Taça de Portugal: 2005–06
- Supertaça Cândido de Oliveira: 2006

Braga

- Taça de Portugal: 2015–16; runner-up: 2014–15
- Taça da Liga: 2012–13; runner-up: 2016–17
- Supertaça Cândido de Oliveira runner-up: 2016
- UEFA Europa League runner-up: 2010–11
