= Jony Fragnoli =

Swiss footballer (born 1989)

Personal information
- Full name: Jonathan Fragnoli
- Date of birth: 31 January 1989 (age 37)
- Place of birth: Chaves, Portugal
- Height: 1.70 m (5 ft 7 in)
- Position: Midfielder

Team information
- Current team: Vidago FC
- Number: 20

Youth career
- 1999–2003: Chaves
- 2003–2004: Flaviense
- 2004–2005: Padroense
- 2005–2006: Porto
- 2006–2007: Chaves
- 2007–2008: Porto

Senior career*
Years	Team	Apps	(Gls)
2008–2009	Verín		
2009–2010	Marítimo B	2	(0)
2011–2012	Fão	11	(2)
2012–2013	Tourizense	30	(2)
2013–2014	Limianos	32	(6)
2014–2015	Santa Clara	2	(0)
2015	Mirandela	8	(1)
2015–2017	Bragança	47	(12)
2017	Merelinense	13	(0)
2017–2018	Vizela	21	(1)
2018	Montalegre	0	(0)
2019–	Vidago FC	31	(1)
- * Club domestic league appearances and goals as of 19:59, 25 January 2021 (UTC)

Jonathan "Jony" Fragnoli (born 31 January 1989) is a Swiss football player who plays for Vidago FC. He also holds Portuguese citizenship.

== Club career ==
He made his professional debut in the Segunda Liga for Santa Clara on 21 December 2014 in a game against Trofense.
