= Vasco Rocha =

Portuguese footballer

Personal information
- Full name: Vasco André Moreira da Rocha
- Date of birth: 29 January 1989 (age 37)
- Place of birth: Paredes, Portugal
- Height: 1.82 m (5 ft 11 1/2 in)
- Position: Midfielder

Team information
- Current team: Paredes

Youth career
- 1997–1999: Paredes
- 1999–2004: Porto
- 2004–2005: Padroense
- 2005–2006: Penafiel
- 2006–2007: Paredes

Senior career*
Years	Team	Apps	(Gls)
2006–2012	Paredes	109	(21)
2012–2014	Aves	77	(11)
2014–2020	Paços Ferreira	87	(2)
2015–2016	→ Feirense (loan)	40	(1)
2019	→ Varzim (loan)	13	(0)
2020–2023	Trofense	87	(2)
2023–2024	Varzim	29	(0)
2024–	Paredes	16	(0)
- * Club domestic league appearances and goals as of 18:31, 18 January 2026 (UTC)

Vasco André Moreira da Rocha (born 29 January 1989) is a Portuguese professional footballer who plays as a midfielder for U.S.C. Paredes.

== Club career ==
Born in Paredes, Porto District, Rocha spent his first six years as a senior competing in the third and fourth divisions of Portuguese football, with hometown's U.S.C. Paredes. In the 2012 off-season he signed for C.D. Aves in the Segunda Liga, making his debut as a professional on 5 August in a 3−1 away loss against C.D. Santa Clara in the Taça da Liga.

On 4 June 2014, Rocha signed a three-year contract with Primeira Liga club F.C. Paços de Ferreira. His first match in the competition occurred on 17 August, when he came on as a late substitute in a 2–0 defeat away to S.L. Benfica.

Rocha scored his first goal in the Portuguese top flight on 10 January 2015, contributing to a 2–2 draw at Académica de Coimbra. On 30 April 2017, his 88th-minute individual effort which concluded the 2–1 away win over C.F. Belenenses and certified his team's survival received widespread media coverage.

On 3 May 2017, Rocha agreed to a two-year extension at the Estádio da Mata Real. Halfway through his side's conquest of the 2018–19 LigaPro, he moved on loan to Varzim S.C. for the rest of the season. On 24 February 2019, he was sent off in a goalless draw at Vitória S.C. B.

Aged 31, Rocha joined third-tier side C.D. Trofense on a one-year contract. In June 2021, following their promotion as champions, he renewed his link until 2023.

Rocha returned to Varzim on 12 June 2023.

== Personal life ==
Rocha's older brother, Romeu, was also a footballer and a midfielder. He shared teams with his sibling on several occasions.
