= Fausto (footballer, born 1985) =

Portuguese footballer

Personal information
- Full name: Fausto José Tomás Lúcio
- Date of birth: 12 January 1985 (age 41)
- Place of birth: Loulé, Portugal
- Height: 1.87 m (6 ft 2 in)
- Position: Defender

Team information
- Current team: Louletano
- Number: 22

Youth career
- 2002–2003: Louletano
- 2003–2004: S.L. Benfica

Senior career*
Years	Team	Apps	(Gls)
2004–2005	UD Messinense		
2005–2008	Louletano	41	(6)
2007	→ Bradford City (loan)	0	(0)
2008	Louletano	12	(1)
2008–2009	Portimonense	15	(1)
2009–2012	Louletano	74	(3)
2012–2013	Ayia Napa	12	(1)
2013–2014	Farense	9	(0)
2014	Al-Shorta	0	(0)
2014–	Louletano	42	(1)
- * Club domestic league appearances and goals as of 6 November 2016

Fausto José Tomás Lúcio (born 12 January 1985) is a Portuguese footballer who plays as a defensive midfielder for Louletano.

== Club career ==
He started his career with Portuguese Second Division team Louletano. He made 74 appearances and one goal for the Portuguese club before joining Ayia Napa. He signed for Al Shorta SC in Iraq in 2014 but was released almost immediately as coach Mohamed Youssef was not impressed with his performance in training.
