= Adaúfe =

- Civil parish
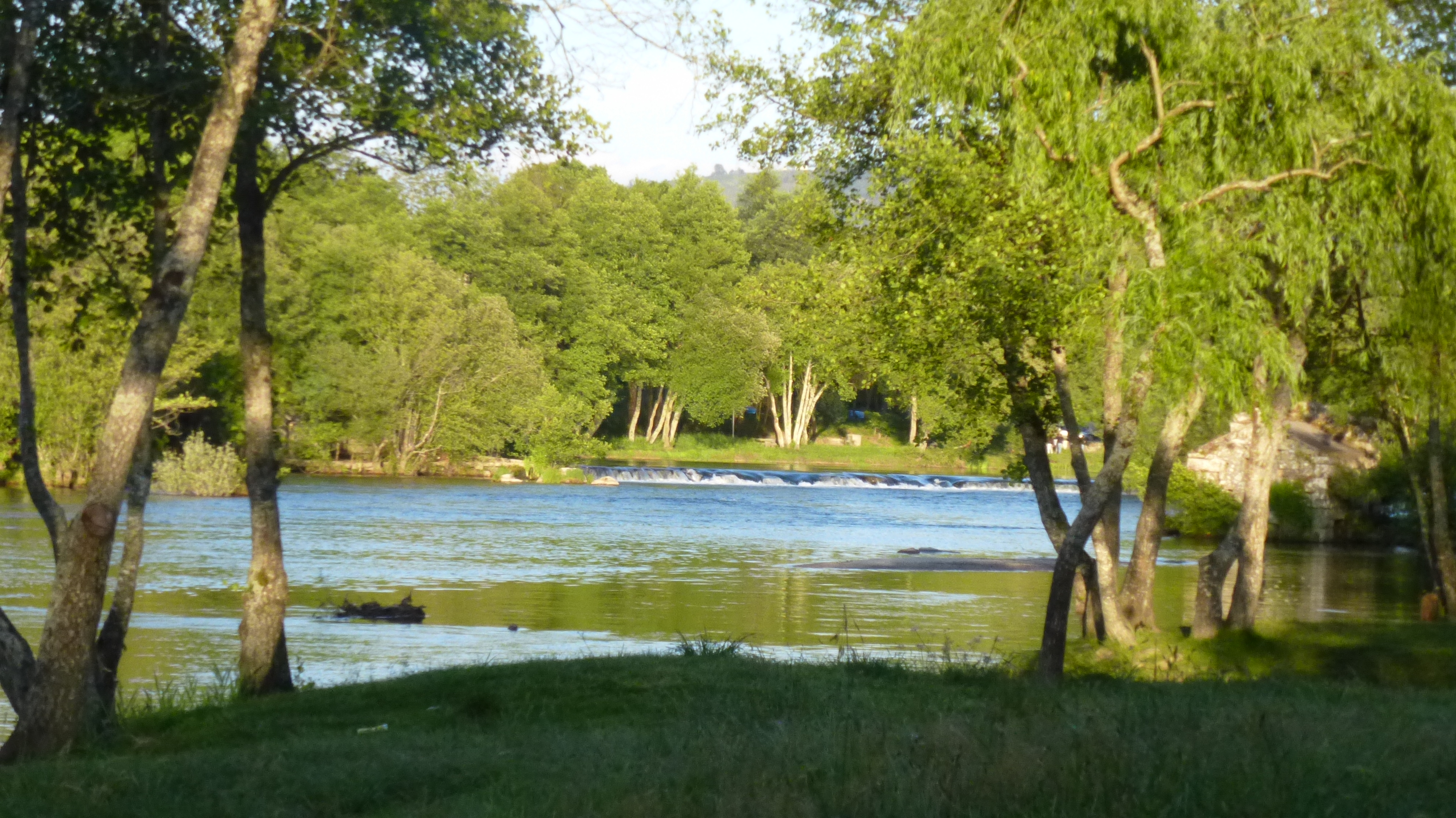
- Cávado River flowing through Adaúfe

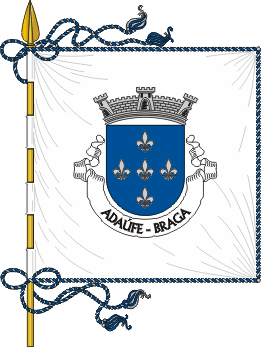
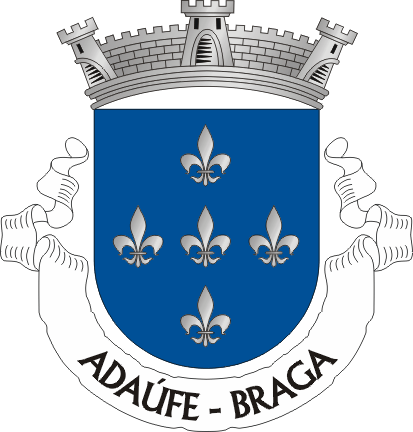
- Flag Coat of arms

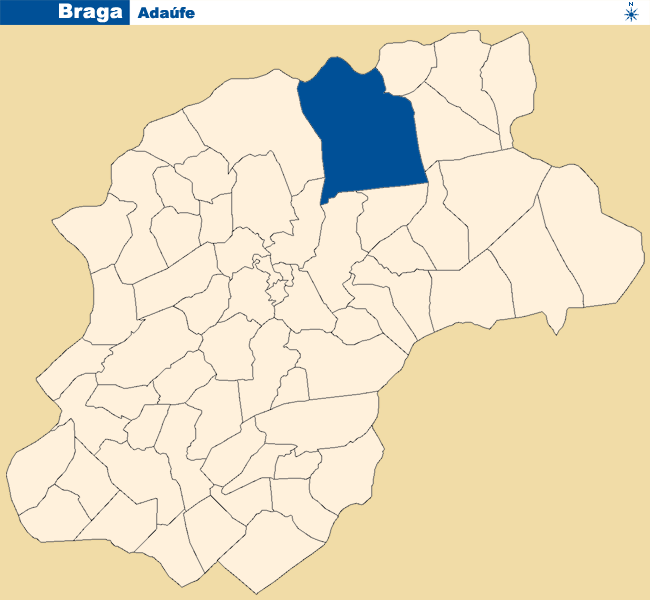
- Coordinates: 41.585°N 8.402°W
- Country: Portugal
- Region: Norte
- Intermunic. comm.: Cávado
- District: Braga
- Municipality: Braga

Area
  - Total: 10.81 km^{2} (4.17 sq mi)

Population (2011)
  - Total: 3,711
  - Density: 343.3/km^{2} (889.1/sq mi)
- Time zone: UTC+00:00 (WET)
  - Summer (DST): UTC+01:00 (WEST)
- Patron: Our Lady of Conception
- Website: http://www.junta-adaufe.pt/

Adaúfe is a Portuguese freguesia ("civil parish"), located in the municipality of Braga. The population in 2011 was 3,711, in an area of 10.81 km^{2}.
