= Gonçalo Abreu =

Portuguese footballer (born 1986)

Personal information
- Full name: Gonçalo Nuno da Silva Abreu
- Date of birth: 25 June 1986 (age 40)
- Place of birth: Funchal, Portugal
- Height: 1.90 m (6 ft 3 in)
- Position: Forward

Youth career
- 1995–1998: Juventude Atlântico
- 1998–2001: Marítimo
- 2001–2002: CD Barreirense
- 2002–2005: Marítimo

Senior career*
Years	Team	Apps	(Gls)
2005–2013	Marítimo B	119	(20)
2005–2012	Marítimo	9	(0)
2009–2010	→ Varzim (loan)	20	(5)
2010–2011	→ Feirense (loan)	23	(4)
2012	→ Atlético (loan)	7	(0)
2013–2014	Ermis	0	(0)
2014	Camacha	12	(1)
2014–2015	Feirense	37	(5)
2015–2017	Penafiel	74	(13)
2017–2018	União Madeira	15	(2)
2018	Gil Vicente	4	(0)
2018–2019	Mafra	8	(0)
Total		328	(50)
- * Club domestic league appearances and goals

Gonçalo Nuno da Silva Abreu (born 25 June 1986) is a Portuguese former professional footballer who played as a forward.

Formed at Marítimo where he made nine Primeira Liga appearances, he spent most of his career in LigaPro, playing 206 games and scoring 31 goals in service of eight clubs.

== Club career ==
Born in Funchal on the island of Madeira, Abreu came through the ranks of hometown club C.S. Marítimo, playing mainly in their reserves in the third division while also making a handful of appearances for the first team in the Primeira Liga. He scored once in the group stage of the UEFA Europa League on 6 December 2012, heading the opening goal of a 2–1 home win against Club Brugge KV.

Abreu was loaned for a year each to second-tier Varzim S.C. in June 2009, and C.D. Feirense a year later, playing regularly and winning promotion as runners-up with the latter. In January 2012, he moved to Atlético Clube de Portugal of the same league on the same basis.

In July 2013, Abreu left Marítimo and signed with Ermis Aradippou FC, newly promoted to the Cypriot First Division. Unused, he returned home with A.D. Camacha of division three in January, then rejoined Feirense in June 2014.

Abreu remained in the second division the following years, with F.C. Penafiel, C.F. União, Gil Vicente F.C. and C.D. Mafra.
