= Romeu Rocha =

Portuguese footballer

Romeu
Personal information
- Full name: Marcos Romeu Moreira da Rocha
- Date of birth: 17 February 1986 (age 40)
- Place of birth: Paredes, Portugal
- Height: 1.85 m (6 ft 1 in)
- Position: Defensive midfielder

Youth career
- 1994−1995: Paredes
- 1995−2001: Porto
- 2001−2005: Penafiel

Senior career*
Years	Team	Apps	(Gls)
2005−2006	Penafiel	0	(0)
2006−2011	Paredes	102	(9)
2011−2013	Aves	51	(0)
2013−2017	Paços Ferreira	39	(1)
2017−2018	Varzim	3	(0)
2018−2020	Amarante	40	(0)
2020−2021	Vila Meã	8	(0)
Total		243	(10)
- * Club domestic league appearances and goals

Marcos Romeu Moreira da Rocha (born 17 February 1986), known as Romeu, is a Portuguese former professional footballer who played as a defensive midfielder.

== Club career ==
Born in Paredes, Porto District, Romeu spent the better part of his first six years as a senior competing in the third and fourth divisions of Portuguese football, with hometown club U.S.C. Paredes. He was part of F.C. Penafiel's Primeira Liga roster in the 2005−06 season, but his input consisted of two bench appearances.

In the summer of 2013, after two years in the Segunda Liga with C.D. Aves, Romeu signed for F.C. Paços de Ferreira of the top flight. He made his debut in the competition on 16 August, playing 17 minutes in a 0−2 home loss against S.C. Braga.

Romeu scored his only goal in the Portuguese top tier on 12 December 2015, opening the 6−0 home win over C.F. União. He suffered a serious muscular injury the following February, going on to miss the entire 2016−17 campaign but having his contract previously renewed.

On 21 June 2017, free agent Romeu joined division two side Varzim S.C. on a one-year deal. The following January, after less than half an hour of game time, he cancelled his contract and dropped down a tier to Amarante FC.

== Personal life ==
Romeu's younger brother, Vasco, was also a footballer and a midfielder. He shared teams with his sibling on several occasions.
