= João Pedro (footballer, born May 1987) =

Portuguese footballer

Personal information
- Full name: João Pedro Oliveira Araújo
- Date of birth: 13 May 1987 (age 39)
- Place of birth: Lavra, Portugal
- Height: 1.83 m (6 ft 0 in)
- Position: Left back

Team information
- Current team: Leça
- Number: 5

Youth career
- 1997–2006: Leixões

Senior career*
Years	Team	Apps	(Gls)
2006–2007	Lavrense		
2007–2008	Paredes		
2008–2011	Leça	80	(4)
2011–2012	Macedo Cavaleiros	21	(0)
2012–2013	Aves	17	(0)
2013–2016	Leixões	89	(1)
2016–2017	Fafe	20	(1)
2017–2018	Olhanense	11	(0)
2018–	Leça	29	(1)
- * Club domestic league appearances and goals as of 21:02, 23 April 2020 (UTC)

João Pedro Oliveira Araújo (born 13 May 1987 in Lavra, Matosinhos), known as João Pedro, is a Portuguese professional footballer who plays for Leça F.C. as a left back.
