= Pedró =

Portuguese footballer

Personal information
- Full name: José Pedro Azevedo Ferreira
- Date of birth: 1 September 1987 (age 39)
- Place of birth: Braga, Portugal
- Height: 1.80 m (5 ft 11 in)
- Position: Midfielder

Team information
- Current team: Amares
- Number: 14

Youth career
- 1999–2003: Braga
- 2000–2001: → Bairro Misericórdia (loan)
- 2002–2003: → Bairro Misericórdia (loan)
- 2003–2006: Gil Vicente

Senior career*
Years	Team	Apps	(Gls)
2006–2008	Santa Maria		
2008–2009	Fão	25	(5)
2009–2010	Tirsense	7	(0)
2010–2011	Vilaverdense	25	(2)
2011–2012	Mirandela	27	(5)
2012–2013	Freamunde	39	(4)
2013–2014	Gil Vicente	2	(0)
2014–2015	Feirense	10	(0)
2015	Vilaverdense	13	(2)
2015–2018	Aves	79	(14)
2018	→ Farense (loan)	9	(1)
2018	Arouca	4	(0)
2019	Merelinense	11	(2)
2019	Vilafranquense	2	(0)
2019–2020	Maia	10	(1)
2020–	Amares	3	(2)
- * Club domestic league appearances and goals as of 20 December 2020

José Pedro Azevedo Ferreira (born 1 September 1987), known as Pedró, is a Portuguese professional footballer who plays for F.C. Amares as a midfielder.

== Club career ==
Born in Braga, Pedró played lower league and amateur football until the age of 25, upon which he signed for Segunda Liga club S.C. Freamunde. He first appeared in the competition on 12 August 2012, in a 2–1 away loss against C.F. União, and scored his first goal late in that year to contribute to a 2–0 victory at S.C. Braga B.

Pedró joined Gil Vicente F.C. from the Primeira Liga for the 2013–14 season. His maiden league appearance took place on 16 February 2014, when he came on as a half-time substitute in a 1–2 home defeat to FC Porto. Released after only two competitive matches, he returned to the second division, with a brief spell in the third with Vilaverdense FC.
