= Vieira (Brazilian footballer) =

Brazilian footballer

Personal information
- Full name: José Vieira Filho
- Date of birth: 1 July 1992 (age 34)
- Place of birth: Morro Agudo, Brazil
- Height: 1.92 m (6 ft 3 1/2 in)
- Position: Forward

Team information
- Current team: Treze

Senior career*
Years	Team	Apps	(Gls)
2012	Sumaré		
2013	Inter de Bebedouro		
2014	Grêmio Anápolis	3	(1)
2014	União Barbarense		
2015–2016	Grêmio Anápolis	2	(1)
2015–2016	→ Penafiel (loan)	23	(3)
2016	→ Olhanense (loan)	2	(0)
2016	→ Cinfães (loan)	8	(1)
2017	América-TO	6	(1)
2018	SC Régua	12	(15)
2019	Lusitano FCV	0	(0)
2019	Leça	7	(0)
2020	Batatais	2	(0)
2020	Novo Hamburgo	3	(0)
2021	São Bernardo	4	(0)
2021	4 de Julho	3	(0)
2022–	Treze	2	(0)
- * Club domestic league appearances and goals as of 13:06, 26 February 2022 (UTC)

José Vieira Filho, known as Vieira (born 1 July 1992) is a Brazilian football player who plays for Treze.

== Career ==
He made his professional debut in the Segunda Liga for Penafiel on 8 August 2015 in a game against Leixões.
