= 2020–21 Vitória S.C. season =

Vitória de Guimarães
2020–21 season
- Chairman: Miguel Pinto Lisboa
- Manager: João Henriques
- Stadium: Estádio D. Afonso Henriques
- Primeira Liga: 7th
- Taça de Portugal: Fourth round
- Taça da Liga: Quarter-finals
- Top goalscorer: League: Óscar Estupiñán (8); All: Óscar Estupiñán (9)
Home colours	Away colours	Third colours
- All statistics correct as of 26 April 2021.

The 2020–21 season was the 98th season in the existence of Vitória S.C. and the club's 14th consecutive season in the top-flight of Portuguese football. In addition to the domestic league, Vitória de Guimarães participated in this season's editions of the Taça de Portugal and the Taça da Liga. The season covers the period from 26 July 2020 to 30 June 2021.

== Players ==
=== First-team squad ===
As of 6 October 2020

Note: Flags indicate national team as defined under FIFA eligibility rules; some limited exceptions apply. Players may hold more than one non-FIFA nationality.

No.	Pos.	Nation	Player
1	GK	POR	Bruno Varela
4	DF	GER	Yann Aurel Bisseck (on loan from Köln)
5	DF	ENG	Easah Suliman
6	DF	GHA	Abdul Mumin
7	FW	ENG	Marcus Edwards
9	FW	BRA	Bruno Duarte
10	FW	POR	Ricardo Quaresma
11	MF	POR	André André
14	DF	GHA	Gideon Mensah (on loan from Red Bull Salzburg)
16	FW	POR	Rochinha
17	DF	MLI	Falaye Sacko
19	MF	ESP	Pepelu (on loan from Levante)
21	FW	RSA	Lyle Foster
22	MF	ENG	Jacob Maddox

No.	Pos.	Nation	Player
24	MF	NGR	Mikel Agu
25	MF	GHA	Alhassan Wakaso
26	DF	GER	Jonas Carls (on loan from Schalke 04)
28	DF	POR	Sílvio
29	GK	CZE	Matouš Trmal
30	DF	BRA	Matheus Mascarenhas (on loan from Fluminense)
31	FW	COL	Óscar Estupiñán
43	MF	GHA	Joseph Amoah
44	DF	POR	Jorge Fernandes
60	DF	CIV	Zié Ouattara
70	MF	POR	André Almeida
86	FW	NOR	Noah Jean Holm
88	MF	POR	Miguel Luís
98	MF	FRA	Nicolas Janvier

=== Out on loan ===
Note: Flags indicate national team as defined under FIFA eligibility rules; some limited exceptions apply. Players may hold more than one non-FIFA nationality.

No.	Pos.	Nation	Player
8	MF	FRA	Denis-Will Poha (at Portimonense until 30 June 2021)
—	DF	BRA	Pedro Henrique (at Al Wehda Mecca until 30 June 2021)
—	DF	POR	Frederico Venâncio (at Lugo until 30 June 2021)
—	FW	GHA	Aziz (at Estoril Praia until 30 June 2021)

== Pre-season and friendlies ==
Win Draw Loss Fixtures

== Competitions ==
=== Overview ===
Competition	First match	Last match	Starting round	Final position	Record							
Competition	First match	Last match	Starting round	Final position	Pld	W	D	L	GF	GA	GD	Win %
Primeira Liga	18 September 2020	19 May 2021	Matchday 1	7th	34	12	7	15	37	44	−7	35.29
Taça de Portugal	21 November 2020	13 December 2020	Third round	Fourth round	2	0	1	1	0	1	−1	0.00
Taça da Liga	16 December 2020		Quarter-finals	Quarter-finals	1	0	1	0	1	1	+0	0.00
Total					37	12	9	16	38	46	−8	32.43

Source: Soccerway

=== Primeira Liga ===
==== League table ====
Pos	Team	Pld	W	D	L	GF	GA	GD	Pts	Qualification or relegation
5	Paços de Ferreira	34	15	8	11	40	41	−1	53	Qualification for the Europa Conference League third qualifying round (Note: Braga qualified for the Europa League group stage by winning the 2020–21 Taça de Portugal. Since they would have qualified for the Europa Conference League third qualifying round by finishing fourth, the berth was awarded to the fifth-placed team (Paços de Ferreira), and the Europa Conference League second qualifying round berth reserved to the fifth-placed team was awarded to the sixth-placed team (Santa Clara).)
6	Santa Clara	34	13	7	14	44	36	+8	46	Qualification for the Europa Conference League second qualifying round
7	Vitória de Guimarães	34	12	7	15	37	44	−7	43 (Note: Vitória de Guimarães are ranked ahead of Moreirense on head-to-head points: Vitória de Guimarães 4, Moreirense 1.)	
8	Moreirense	34	10	13	11	37	43	−6	43	
9	Famalicão	34	10	10	14	40	48	−8	40 (Note: Famalicão are ranked ahead of Belenenses SAD on head-to-head points: Famalicão 4, Belenenses SAD 1.)	

Source: Liga Portugal
Rules for classification: 1) Points; 2) Head-to-head points; 3) Head-to-head goal difference; 4) Head-to-head away goals scored; 5) Goal difference; 6) Matches won; 7) Goals scored; 8) Play-off.

==== Results summary ====
Overall								Home						Away					
Pld	W	D	L	GF	GA	GD	Pts	W	D	L	GF	GA	GD	W	D	L	GF	GA	GD
34	12	7	15	37	44	−7	43	7	1	9	21	27	−6	5	6	6	16	17	−1

Source: Liga Portugal

==== Results by round ====
Round	1	2	3	4	5	6	7	8	9	10	11	12	13	14	15	16	17	18	19	20	21	22	23	24	25	26	27	28	29	30	31	32	33	34
Ground	H	A	H	A	H	A	H	A	H	A	H	H	A	H	A	H	A	A	H	A	H	A	H	A	H	A	H	A	A	H	A	H	A	H
Result	L	D	W	W	L	W	L	W	W	W	L	W	D	D	W	W	D	D	L	L	W	L	L	L	L	L	W	L	L	W	D	L	D	L
Position	13	12	7	5	7	6	9	6	5	5	5	5	5	6	6	6	6	6	6	6	6	6	6	6	6	7	6	6	6	6	6	7	7	7

Source: Liga Portugal
A = Away; H = Home; W = Win; D = Draw; L = Loss

==== Matches ====
The league fixtures were announced on 28 August 2020.

18 September 2020 1	Vitória de Guimarães	0–1	Belenenses SAD	Guimarães
21:15 WEST (UTC+1)	André André (yellow card) 65'	Report	Henrique (yellow card) 43'; Phete 47'; Cauê (yellow card) 51'; Cardoso (yellow card) 58'; Taira (yellow card) 74'	Stadium: Estádio D. Afonso Henriques; Attendance: 0 (Note: The match was played behind closed doors due to the COVID-19 pandemic in Portugal.); Referee: Manuel Oliveira

27 September 2020 2	Rio Ave	0–0	Vitória de Guimarães	Vila do Conde
21:00 WEST (UTC+1)	Santos (yellow card) 33'; Jambor (yellow card) 61'	Report	Sílvio (yellow card) 58'; Janvier (yellow card) 65'; Fernandes (yellow card) 77'	Stadium: Estádio dos Arcos; Attendance: 0 Referee: Tiago Martins

2 October 2020 3	Vitória de Guimarães	1–0	Paços de Ferreira	Guimarães
21:15 WEST (UTC+1)	Suliman (yellow card) 75'; Sílvio (yellow card) 79'; André André 82'; Bruno (yellow card) 87'; Varela (yellow card) 90+1'	Report	Marcelo (yellow card) 67'; Baixinho (yellow card) 90+4'	Stadium: Estádio D. Afonso Henriques; Attendance: 0 Referee: Helder Malheiro

19 October 2020 4	Boavista	0–1	Vitória de Guimarães	Porto
20:15 WEST (UTC+01:00)		Report	Edwards 19'	Stadium: Estádio do Bessa; Attendance: 0 Referee: Nuno Almeida

25 October 2020 5	Vitória de Guimarães	0–1	Braga	Guimarães
20:00 WET (UTC±0)		Report	Esgaio 27'	Stadium: Estádio D. Afonso Henriques; Attendance: 0 Referee: Fábio Veríssimo

1 November 2020 6	Gil Vicente	1–2	Vitória de Guimarães	Barcelos
17:30 WET (UTC±0)	Fernandes (yellow card) 61'; Samuel Lino 66'	Report	Bruno Duarte 23'; Varela (yellow card) 52'; Luís (yellow card) 82'; Rochinha 89'	Stadium: Estádio Cidade de Barcelos; Attendance: 0 Referee: Gustavo Correira

7 November 2020 7	Vitória de Guimarães	0–4	Sporting CP	Guimarães
20:30 WET (UTC±0)	Agu (yellow card) 3'; André (yellow card) 39'; Suliman (yellow card) 42'	Report	Santos 11'; Porro (yellow card) 39'; Gonçalves 43', 55'; Cabral 79'	Stadium: Estádio D. Afonso Henriques; Attendance: 0 Referee: Hugo Miguel

27 November 2020 8	Tondela	0–2	Vitória de Guimarães	Tondela
21:00 WET (UTC±0)	João Pedro (yellow card) 47'; Agra (red card) 72'	Report	Almeida (yellow card) 54'; André André 58'; Bruno Duarte 63'; Maddox (yellow card) 90+2'	Stadium: Estádio João Cardoso; Attendance: 0 Referee: Artur Soares Dias

5 December 2020 9	Vitória de Guimarães	1–0	Portimonense	Guimarães
15:30 WET (UTC±0)	Sílvio (yellow card) 18'; Mumin (yellow card) 27'; André André 32'; Pepelu (yellow card) 65'; Quaresma (yellow card) 82'; Luís (yellow card) 90+4'	Report	Lucas (yellow card) 29'; Sá (yellow card) 43'; Dener (yellow card) 69'; Wiilyan (yellow card) 90+4'	Stadium: Estádio D. Afonso Henriques; Attendance: 0 Referee: António Nobre

21 December 2020 10	Santa Clara	0–4	Vitória de Guimarães	Ponta Delgada
19:45 WET (UTC±0)	Villanueva (yellow card) 56'	Report	André André 6'; Quaresma 27'; Estupiñán 30', 54'	Stadium: Estádio de São Miguel; Attendance: 0 Referee: Rui Costa

29 December 2020 11	Vitória de Guimarães	2–3	Porto	Guimarães
21:00 WET (UTC±0)	Rochinha 7'; Mensah (yellow card) 15'; Pepelu (yellow card) 26'; Estupiñán 63'	Report	Baró (yellow card) 11'; Taremi 42', 65'; Díaz 80'	Stadium: Estádio D. Afonso Henriques; Attendance: 0 Referee: Hélder Malheiro

9 January 2021 13	Moreirense	2–2	Vitória de Guimarães	Braga
19:00 WET (UTC±0)	Pires 15'; A. Soares 70'; Pacheco (yellow card) 87'; D'Alberto (yellow card) 90+2'	Report	Edwards 20'; Quaresma (yellow card) 65'; André André 67'; Fernandes (yellow card) 85'; Mumin (yellow card) 90+3'	Stadium: Parque de Jogos Comendador Joaquim de Almeida Freitas; Attendance: 0 Referee: Artur Soares Dias

17 January 2021 14	Vitória de Guimarães	2–2	Farense	Guimarães
21:45 WET (UTC±0)	Pepelu 14'; Edwards 36'	Report	Gauld 21'; Alex Pinto (yellow card) 37' (yellow-red card) 59'; Abner (yellow card) 54'; Stojiljković 79'	Stadium: Estádio D. Afonso Henriques; Attendance: 0 Referee: João Pinheiro

21 January 2021 12	Vitória de Guimarães	3–1	Nacional	Guimarães
20:15 WET (UTC±0)	Quaresma 22'; Mensah (yellow card) 33'; Fernandes (yellow card) 42'; Estupiñán 51'; Lucas Kal 61' (o.g.); André André (yellow card) 66'	Report	Gorré 15', (yellow card) 57'; Azouni (yellow card) 19'	Stadium: Estádio D. Afonso Henriques; Attendance: 0 Referee: Gustavo Correira
Note: The match was originally scheduled for 3 January 2021, but was postponed.

24 January 2021 15	Famalicão	0–1	Vitória de Guimarães	Vila Nova de Famalicão
20:15 WET (UTC±0)	Ugarte (yellow card) 68'; Pereyra (yellow card) 90+3'	Report	Almeida 12', (yellow card) 54'; Estupiñán (yellow card) 16'; Fernandes (yellow card) 85'; Wakaso (yellow card) 87'	Stadium: Estádio Municipal 22 de Junho; Attendance: 0 Referee: Hugo Miguel

31 January 2021 16	Vitória de Guimarães	1–0	Marítimo	Guimarães
15:00 WET (UTC±0)	Mumin (yellow card) 41'; Estupiñán 48'; Suliman (yellow card) 90+2'	Report	Renê (yellow card) 9'; Hermes (yellow card) 81'	Stadium: Estádio D. Afonso Henriques; Attendance: 0 Referee: Fábio Veríssimo

5 February 2021 17	Benfica	0–0	Vitória de Guimarães	Lisbon
19:00 WET (UTC±0)	Weigl (yellow card) 67'	Report	André (yellow card) 32'; Trmal (yellow card) 90+1'	Stadium: Estádio da Luz; Attendance: 0 Referee: Nuno Almeida

8 February 2021 18	Belenenses SAD	1–1	Vitória de Guimarães	Lisbon
21:00 WET (UTC±0)	G. Silva (yellow card) 12'; Cassierra 30'; Lima (yellow card) 37'; Henrique (yellow card) 63'	Report	Sacko (yellow card) 23'; Mensah (yellow card) 25'; Estupiñán 38'	Stadium: Estádio Nacional; Attendance: 0 Referee: André Narciso

13 February 2021 19	Vitória de Guimarães	1–3	Rio Ave	Guimarães
18:00 WET (UTC±0)	Quaresma (yellow card) 58', (goal) 70'; Fernandes (yellow card) 85'	Report	Mané 23'; Camacho 32'; Gelson 74'; Pinto (yellow card) 87'; Amaral (yellow card) 89'	Stadium: Estádio D. Afonso Henriques; Attendance: 0 Referee: Gustavo Correia

21 February 2021 20	Paços de Ferreira	2–1	Vitória de Guimarães	Paços de Ferreira
15:00 WET (UTC±0)	Pedro 32'; Ferreira 62'	Report	Estupiñán 23'; Sacko (yellow card) 70'; Pepelu (yellow card) 82'	Stadium: Estádio da Mata Real; Attendance: 0 Referee: Nuno Almeida

26 February 2021 21	Vitória de Guimarães	2–1	Boavista	Guimarães
20:30 WET (UTC±00:00)	Rochinha 39'; André André (yellow card) 58', (goal) 63' (pen.); Pepelu (yellow card) 84'	Report	Mangas 17', (yellow card) 62'; Gomes (yellow card) 80'; Pérez (yellow card) 85'; Devensih (yellow card) 90+6'	Stadium: Estádio D. Afonso Henriques; Attendance: 0 Referee: Fábio Veríssimo

9 March 2021 22	Braga	3–0	Vitória de Guimarães	Braga
21:45 WET (UTC±0)	Piazon 5', (yellow card) 42'; Ruiz 40'; Šporar 85'	Report	Ouattara (yellow card) 2'; André (yellow card) 59'	Stadium: Estádio Municipal de Braga; Attendance: 0 Referee: Hugo Miguel

14 March 2021 23	Vitória de Guimarães	2–4	Gil Vicente	Guimarães
17:30 WET (UTC±0)	Rochinha 40'; Lameiras 78'	Report	Marques 19'; Lourency 26'; Talocha 45+3' (pen.); Mineiro 80'	Stadium: Estádio D. Afonso Henriques; Attendance: 0 Referee: João Pinheiro

20 March 2021 24	Sporting CP	1–0	Vitória de Guimarães	Lisbon
20:30 WET (UTC±0)	Inácio 44'; Neto (yellow card) 68'; João Mário (yellow card) 72'	Report	Pepelu (yellow card) 89'	Stadium: Estádio José Alvalade; Attendance: 0 Referee: Tiago Martins

4 April 2021 25	Vitória de Guimarães	1–2	Tondela	Guimarães
17:30 WEST (UTC+1)	Estupiñán 39'	Report	González 27', 76'	Stadium: Estádio D. Afonso Henriques; Attendance: 0 Referee: Fábio Melo

9 April 2021 26	Portimonense	3–0	Vitória de Guimarães	Portimão
20:00 WEST (UTC+1)	Lucas 4'; Dener 64' (pen.); Beto 67'	Report		Stadium: Estádio Municipal de Portimão; Attendance: 0 Referee: Manuel Oliveira

17 April 2021 27	Vitória de Guimarães	1–0	Santa Clara	Guimarães
15:30 WEST (UTC+1)	Rochinha 17'	Report		Stadium: Estádio D. Afonso Henriques; Attendance: 0 Referee: Rui Costa

22 April 2021 28	Porto	1–0	Vitória de Guimarães	Porto
21:00 WEST (UTC+1)	Marega 49', (yellow card) 74'	Report	Mensah (yellow card) 55'	Stadium: Estádio do Dragão; Attendance: 0 Referee: Tiago Martins

26 April 2021 29	Nacional	1–0	Vitória de Guimarães	Funchal
19:00 WEST (UTC+1)	Mendes 7'	Report		Stadium: Estádio da Madeira; Attendance: 0 Referee: Fábio Veríssimo

30 April 2021 30	Vitória de Guimarães	2–0	Moreirense	Guimarães
17:00 WEST (UTC+1)	Amaro 26', (yellow card) 53'; Almeida 30'; Sílvio (yellow card) 40'; Bruno (yellow card) 76'	Report	Pacheco (yellow card) 42'	Stadium: Estádio D. Afonso Henriques; Attendance: 0 Referee: Vitor Ferreira

6 May 2021 31	Farense	2–2	Vitória de Guimarães	Faro
20:30 WEST (UTC+1)	Pedro Henrique 12', 27'; Gauld (yellow card) 69'; César (yellow card) 81'; Abner (yellow card) 88'	Report	Rochinha 2'; Suliman (yellow card) 42' (yellow-red card) 51'; Pepelu (yellow card) 62'; Quaresma 90+1'; Bruno (yellow card) 90+5'	Stadium: Estádio de São Luís; Attendance: 0 Referee: André Narciso

12 May 2021 32	Vitória de Guimarães	1–2	Famalicão	Guimarães
20:15 WEST (UTC+1)	Bruno Duarte 6'; Pepelu (yellow card) 68'; André André (yellow card) 69'; Ricardo Quaresma (yellow card) 90+2'	Report	Kraev 21'; Babić (yellow card) 35'; Diogo Queirós (yellow card) 60'; Ugarte (yellow card) 66'; Ivo Rodrigues (yellow card) 69'; Heriberto Tavares 85'	Stadium: Estádio D. Afonso Henriques; Attendance: 0 Referee: (Portugal) Manuel Mota

16 May 2021 33	Marítimo	0–0	Vitória de Guimarães	Funchal
20:00 WEST (UTC+1)	René (yellow card) 18'; Correa (yellow card) 35'; Tagueu (yellow card) 65'; Pedro Pelágio (yellow card) 70'	Report	Mensah (yellow card) 35'; Sacko (yellow card) 43'	Stadium: Estádio do Marítimo; Attendance: 0 Referee: (Portugal) António Nobre

19 May 2021 34	Vitória de Guimarães	1–3	Benfica	Guimarães
20:00 WEST (UTC+1)	Jorge Fernandes (yellow card) 53' (goal) 63'	Report	Taarabt (yellow card) 43'; Seferovic 48' 58'; Everton 90+1'	Stadium: Estádio D. Afonso Henriques; Attendance: 0 Referee: (Portugal) Vitor Ferreira

=== Taça de Portugal ===
21 November 2020 Third round	Arouca	0–0 (a.e.t.) (6–7 p)	Vitória de Guimarães	Arouca
16:30 WET (UTC±0)	Quaresma (yellow card) 27'; Moreira (yellow card) 72'; João Basso (yellow card) 86'; Bukia (yellow card) 90'	Report	Ouattara (yellow card) 35' (yellow-red card) 45+2'; Quaresma (yellow card) 43'; Maddox (yellow card) 73'; Pepelu (yellow card) 105+1'	Stadium: Estádio Municipal de Arouca; Referee: Rui Costa
	Penalties
	L. Silva (penalty missed); Rodrigues (penalty scored); Soares (penalty scored); João Basso (penalty scored); Thales (penalty scored); Ofori (penalty scored); Ferreira (penalty scored); Blondell (penalty missed)		(penalty scored) André André; (penalty scored) Rochinha; (penalty scored) Pepelu; (penalty scored) Edwards; (penalty missed) Sílvio; (penalty scored) Holm; (penalty scored) Maddox; (penalty scored) Fernandes

13 December 2020 Fourth round	Vitória de Guimarães	0–1	Santa Clara	Guimarães
15:00 WET (UTC±0)	Sacko (yellow card) 43'; Varela (yellow card) 90+4'	Report	Júlio Romão 8'; Ramos (yellow card) 24'	Stadium: Estádio D. Afonso Henriques; Attendance: 0 Referee: Manuel Oliveira

=== Taça da Liga ===
16 December 2020 Quarter-finals	Benfica	1–1 (4–1 p)	Vitória de Guimarães	Lisbon
21:00 WET (UTC±0)	Taarabt (yellow card) 41'; Pizzi 83' (pen.)	Report	Estupiñán 16'; Fernandes (yellow card) 52'; Luís (yellow card) 60'; Janvier (yellow card) 76'; Poha (yellow card) 82'	Stadium: Estádio da Luz; Attendance: 0 Referee: Fábio Veríssimo
	Penalties
	Everton (penalty scored); Pizzi (penalty scored); Gabriel (penalty scored); Seferovic (penalty scored)		(penalty missed) Almeida; (penalty scored) Pepelu; (penalty missed) Poha
