= 2017–18 S.L. Benfica season =

Benfica
2017–18 season
- President: Luís Filipe Vieira
- Manager: Rui Vitória
- Stadium: Estádio da Luz
- Primeira Liga: 2nd
- Taça de Portugal: Fifth round
- Taça da Liga: Third round
- Supertaça Cândido de Oliveira: Winners
- UEFA Champions League: Group stage
- Top goalscorer: League: Jonas (34); All: Jonas (37)
- Highest home attendance: 63,526 v Porto (15 April 2018)
- Lowest home attendance: 21,355 v Portimonense (20 December 2017)
- Average home league attendance: 53,209
- Biggest win: Benfica 6–0 Vitória de Setúbal (26 November 2017)
- Biggest defeat: Basel 5–0 Benfica (27 September 2017)
Home colours	Away colours

The 2017–18 season was Sport Lisboa e Benfica's 114th season in existence and the club's 84th consecutive season in the top flight of Portuguese football. It started on 5 August 2017 with Benfica's victory in the Supertaça Cândido de Oliveira and concluded on 13 May 2018.

Benfica played in the Primeira Liga as four-time defending champions for the first time in their history and finished second. Benfica also entered the Taça de Portugal as title holders but were eliminated in the fifth round. Moreover, they were eliminated in the third round of the Taça da Liga.

Internationally, Benfica competed in the UEFA Champions League for the eight time in a row but failed to gain a single point in the group stage for their first time, finishing with a negative goal difference of 13, which became the worst campaign of a Portuguese team in that competition.

== Season overview ==
On 29 June 2017, club president Luís Filipe Vieira gave the motto for the coming season, "Rumo ao Penta", and promised a renewed ambition to conquer an unprecedented fifth-straight Primeira Liga title for Benfica. The following day, manager Rui Vitória explained his approach to the new season: "We know that there's a goal previously assumed by the President and the best way to achieve it is to go on together, like it was the first time. It is fundamental to have the first time ambition. Humble and focused so that it can happen." Despite the ambition, on 31 July, Vieira said "one can mortgage a title or another but not the future [of the club]", referring to a strategy of managing the club's debt through the sale of players.

=== Transfers ===
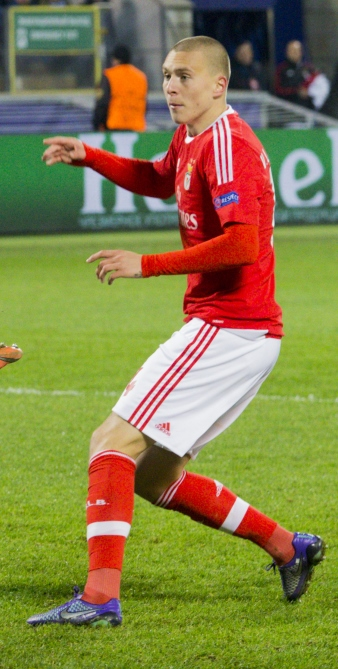
Swedish central defender Victor Lindelöf left Benfica after five and a half years.

Haris Seferovic, Filip Krovinović, Martin Chrien and Bruno Varela transferred to Benfica. Diogo Gonçalves and Rúben Dias were promoted from Benfica B and João Carvalho integrated the team after a loan spell at Vitória de Setúbal.

Benfica lost three players from the starting 11 before the season started: on 1 June, Ederson signed with Manchester City for €40 million; on 14 June, Victor Lindelöf left to Manchester United for €35 million; and on 14 July, Nélson Semedo moved to Barcelona for €30.5 million. On 31 July, referring to the club's sales, Vieira said, "Until we do not have control over the debt, we will not stop selling."

Later in August, Benfica loaned out André Carrillo to Watford and André Horta to Braga, while Mile Svilar joined from Anderlecht. On transfer deadline day, Benfica announced the signings of Douglas and Gabriel Barbosa, both on a one-year loan spell from their respective clubs. The same day, Kostas Mitroglou, Benfica's top goalscorer in the previous season, was transferred to Olympique de Marseille for €15 million.

During the mid-season transfer window, Lisandro López signed with Inter Milan on a half-year loan deal with an option to make the switch permanent. On 25 January, Filipe Augusto was loaned out to Alanyaspor for one-and-a-half years and Barbosa's contract was terminated.

=== Pre-season ===
The pre-season started on 30 June 2017 with the usual medical exams and physical tests at Caixa Futebol Campus and at Hospital da Luz. Until 12 July, the work schedule took place on the club's training ground. As for the team's commitments, the program included the Uhrencup in Switzerland, a five-day stay in Algarve with two matches, and a stage at St George's Park in England, from 23 to 28 July, before the Emirates Cup. Benfica finished third in the Swiss tournament after a 5–1 defeat to Young Boys. The team redeemed itself with a victory in the Algarve Football Cup thanks to a brace by newly signed Seferovic. On 26 July, Benfica played a behind-closed-doors friendly against Swindon Town at Futebol Campus, where Seferovic and Andrija Živković scored for Benfica in a 2–1 win. Once again, Benfica stood powerless in the Emirates Cup. By losing both matches, the team repeated its fourth-place finish achieved in 2014. Due to Chapecoense's cancellation, Benfica did not host the Eusébio Cup in the pre-season for the first time since its first edition in 2008.

As with the previous season, Benfica kept struggling with player injuries. On 17 June, Álex Grimaldo did not take part in Spain's squad for the UEFA European Under-21 Championship due to a "little injury" resulting in him missing the start of Benfica's pre-season. Nine days after signing with Benfica, Krovinović underwent surgery on 23 June to correct a left inguinal hernia. He was one of three players absent from the squad who travelled to Switzerland, along with Luisão (right knee injury) and Eduardo Salvio (right tibiotarsal sprain). André Almeida suffered a contusion on his right thigh, which prevented him from travelling to Algarve.

=== Supertaça Cândido de Oliveira ===
For the opening match of the regular season, Benfica had five players on the injury list: Júlio César, Živković, Carrillo, Horta and Mitroglou. Andreas Samaris was also not an option because he was serving the first of a four-match suspension for having punched Diego Ivo on 9 April. Benfica defeated Vitória de Guimarães 3–1 with goals from Jonas, Seferovic and Raúl Jiménez. Raphinha scored for Vitória. It was the first time Benfica managed to win back-to-back Super Cup trophies. Seferovic made his official debut for Benfica and Varela, a former Benfica B player, debuted for the first team after being called up to the substitutes' bench nine times since 2011. Grimaldo suffered a muscular injury on his right leg and was substituted for Eliseu in the 75th minute.

=== Primeira Liga ===
With three consecutive victories, Benfica achieved their best start in the Primeira Liga since the 2004–05 season. By scoring a goal in each of those matches, Seferovic managed to score in his first four official appearances for Benfica, repeating the feat of Mário Coluna and Nolito (all behind Eusébio). A 1–1 draw at Rio Ave, in a match where Jardel was substituted due to injury on his right tight, left Benfica in third place of the league by the end of August. After losing 2–1 at Boavista and drawing 1–1 with Marítimo at the Estádio dos Barreiros, Benfica were 5 points behind leaders Porto before October's international break.

Benfica won their next three matches but maintained the point difference to the top of the table. By scoring, at least, one goal per match between Match 3 and Match 11, Jonas became the third Benfica player to score in nine consecutive Primeira Liga matches after Julinho (1949–50) and Eusébio (1964–65). He improved his mark by scoring in the following match. Benfica ended 2017 with 36 points, 3 less than their two rivals.

2018 started with the Lisbon derby at home, which ended in a 1–1 draw. Midway through January, in a match against Chaves, Krovinović suffered a season-ending injury to his right knee. The results of round 21 lifted Benfica into second place, thus surpassing Sporting CP on the account of the goal difference criteria. Despite the ascendant in the league table, Benfica still could not avoid player injuries; Salvio suffered another right knee injury and was submitted to an arthroscopy.

After a 5–0 home win on 3 March, Benfica achieved five consecutive victories for the first time during the season. On 10 March, Benfica assured a place in Europa League's qualifying rounds. On round 28, Benfica regained the first place, with a one-point lead over Porto. The nine-match win streak came to an end after a 1–0 home defeat in O Clássico, a result that also culminated in a return to the second place. It was the fourth match in a row Benfica could not beat Porto at the Estádio da Luz (two draws and two defeats), a negative record achieved for the third time. With a 3–2 home loss to Tondela, Benfica suffered two consecutive league defeats at Estádio da Luz for the first time since the 2008–09 season.

With a 1–0 home win against Moreirense on the last matchday, Benfica attained 80+ points in the Primeira Liga for the fourth consecutive season. Due to the defeat of Sporting CP at Funchal, Benfica's result allowed the club to secure the second place and the qualification for the 2018–19 UEFA Champions League third qualifying round.

=== UEFA Champions League ===
"It did not went well. It started early with the first game... but there is life beyond the Champions League. We are looking to win the domestic competitions."

— Rui Vitória after Benfica's Champions League elimination, 22 November 2017

Twenty five players made Benfica's list for the group stage of the UEFA Champions League. Benfica started the European campaign with a 2–1 home defeat to CSKA Moscow, in what was their first loss of the season. On 27 September, Benfica moved to the bottom of Group A after a 5–0 away loss to Basel. It was Benfica's biggest defeat in the UEFA Champions League (tied with the loss to Borussia Dortmund in the 1963–64 European Cup) and second overall in international competition.

On 18 October, Svilar became the youngest goalkeeper to play in Champions League, in a match where Benfica suffered a 1–0 home loss against Manchester United. Benfica was eliminated from European competitions after a 2–0 away loss to CSKA Moscow. By failing to score, Benfica put an end to Igor Akinfeev's streak of 43 straight UEFA Champions League group stage matches without a clean sheet. Also, with this result, Benfica lost 6 consecutive European matches for the first time in their history. This entry increased to seven consecutive losses with a 2–0 home defeat on the last matchday. Benfica became the nineteenth club, and the first seeded into Pot 1, to finish the UEFA Champions League group stage with 0 points.

=== Taça da Liga ===
Benfica started with a 1–1 home draw against Braga, in a match where Krovinović made his official debut. It was the first time since 2007 that Benfica did not win in the competition at the Estádio da Luz, ending a 20-home-game win run. After the final whistle, Samaris was involved in an altercation with Paulinho and saw a yellow card. Six days later, Samaris was punished by the Disciplinary Committee with a three-match suspension, missing Primeira Liga fixtures. Benfica continued to perform under expectations and, on 20 December, they had another home draw, despite having a 2–0 lead before the break. Two days later, they were eliminated from the competition after Vitória de Setúbal defeated Braga. With a third draw in the last match, Benfica ended their participation in the Taça da Liga without a single win for the first time.

=== Taça de Portugal ===
On 14 October, Benfica beat Olhanense 1–0 away from home in the third round of Taça de Portugal. The match was initially scheduled to be played at the Estádio José Arcanjo but was changed to the Estádio Algarve. Four players (Júlio César, Eliseu, Jardel and Jonas) missed the game due to injury, while Douglas, Carvalho and Svilar made their debut for Benfica. On 13 December, for the second time in this season, Benfica could not win at the Estádio dos Arcos. After a 2–2 draw at the end of regulation time, Hélder Guedes scored the winning goal for Rio Ave, thus eliminating the reigning title holders. Luisão got injured (right thigh muscle injury) during the second half's stoppage time, leaving Benfica to play the extra time in numerical disadvantage.

=== Aftermath ===
On 11 June, Vieira regretted the club's disappointing season overall and took responsibility for not managing to win the penta and for the negative campaign in the Champions League. Despite that, he denied disinvestment in the football team and highlighted its competitiveness. Former Benfica player and sporting director António Simões criticised the team's lack of quality and said, "With this squad and other rivals reinforcing themselves, Benfica will not win again." By failing to win the Primeira Liga and the Taça de Portugal, Benfica did not qualify for the 2018 edition of the Supertaça Cândido de Oliveira, breaking a streak of four consecutive appearances at the competition.

Five Benfica players were called by their respective national team to take part in the 2018 FIFA World Cup: Dias (Portugal), Salvio (Argentina), Živković (Serbia), Seferovic (Switzerland) and Jiménez (Mexico).

On 7 July, Benfica announced that Shéu Han, the team's technical secretary since 1989, decided to leave his post. On 31 July, Paulo Lopes announced his retirement via Instagram, making this his last season as a professional footballer. Similarly, Eliseu also retired after his contract was not renewed, even though he said in a 2019 interview that his career was on standby. Although Luisão integrated the squad for the following season, his last professional match was on round 34 of Primeira Liga, before retiring on 25 September.

== Club ==
=== Technical staff ===
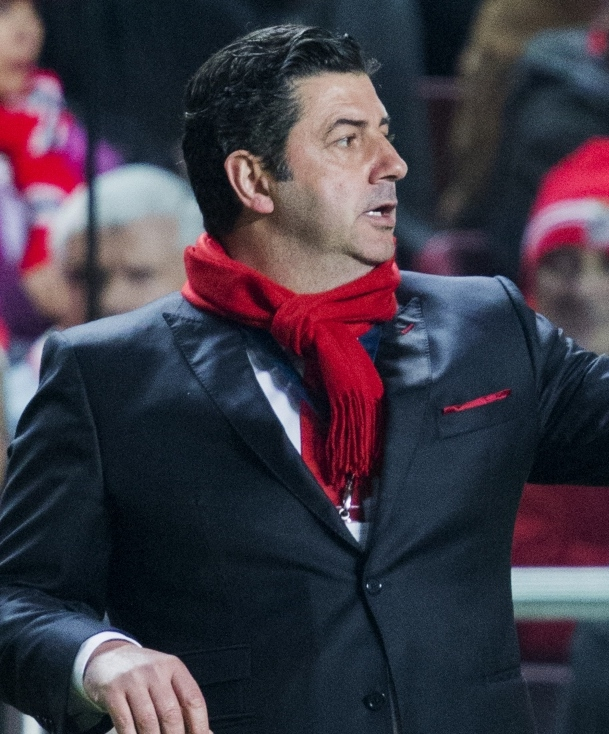
Rui Vitória as Benfica manager

Position	Name
Head coach	Rui Vitória
Assistant coach	Sérgio Botelho; Marco Pedroso; Minervino Pietra; Arnaldo Teixeira
Rehabilitation physiotherapist	Bruno Mendes
Goalkeeping coach	Luís Esteves
Fitness coach	Paulo Morão
Match observer scout	Luís Figueiredo; Renato Sousa
Physiotherapist	Telmo Firmino; Paulo Rebelo
Scout	José Boto
Technical secretary	Shéu
Doctor	Bento Leitão; António Martins; Lluís Til
Nurse	Duarte Pinto

=== Other information ===
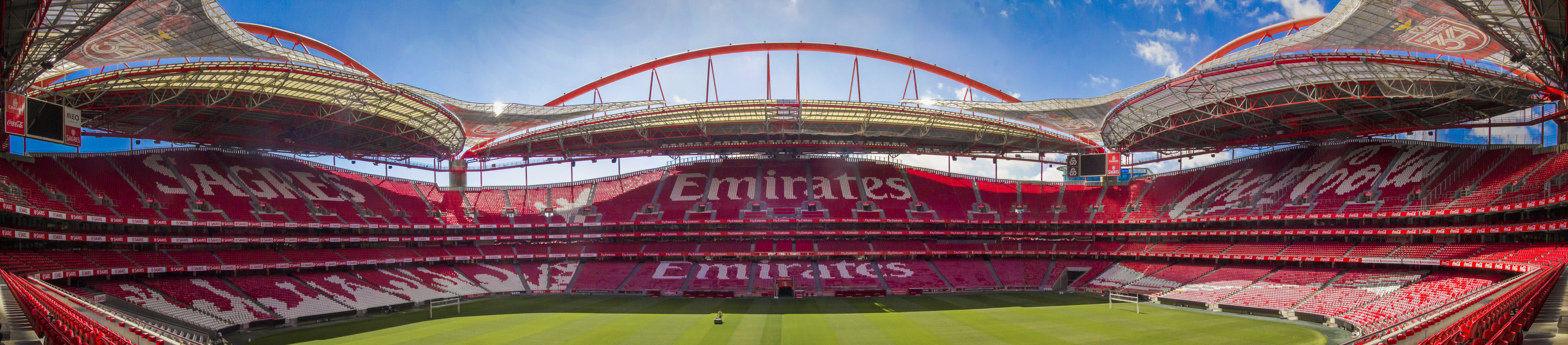
Estádio da Luz

President	Luís Filipe Vieira
Vice-president	Sílvio Cérvan; José Eduardo Moniz
Chairman	Domingos Soares de Oliveira; Rui Costa
Communications director	Luís Bernardo; Ricardo Lemos
Ground (capacity and dimensions)	Estádio da Luz (64,642 / 105×68 metres)
Training ground	Caixa Futebol Campus

== Players ==
=== Squad information ===
N	Pos.	Nat.	Name	Age	Since	App	Goals	Ends	Transfer fee	Notes
1	GK	(Belgium)	Svilar	18	2017	9	0	2022	€4.5M	
3	LB	(Spain)	Grimaldo	22	2016 (Winter)	63	3	2021	€2.12M	
4	CB	(Brazil)	Luisão (captain)	37	2003	538	46	2018	Undisclosed	
5	DM	(Serbia)	Fejsa	29	2013	131	2	2021	Undisclosed	
7	CM	(Greece)	Samaris	29	2014	135	3	2019	€10M	
8	RB	(Brazil)	Douglas	27	2017	10	0	2018	Undisclosed	On loan from Barcelona
9	ST	(Mexico)	Raúl	27	2015	120	30	2020	€21.8M	Record signing
10	ST	(Brazil)	Jonas	34	2014	152	122	2019	Free	
13	GK	(Portugal)	Paulo Lopes	40	2012	11	0	2018	Free	Originally from youth system
14	FW	(Switzerland)	Seferovic	26	2017	27	7	2022	€3.9M	
17	RW	(Serbia)	Živković	21	2016	54	4	2021	€6M	
18	RW	(Argentina)	Salvio	27	2010–2011; 2012	238	55	2019	€13.5M	Played on loan in the 2010–11 season
19	LB	(Portugal)	Eliseu	34	2014	109	4	2018	Undisclosed	
20	MF	(Croatia)	Krovinović	22	2017	19	2	2022	€3.5M	
21	CM	(Portugal)	Pizzi	28	2014	175	31	2022	€14M	
22	LW	(Argentina)	F. Cervi	24	2016	78	11	2022	€5.74M	
27	LW	(Portugal)	Silva	25	2016	56	3	2021	€16.4M	
30	GK	(Portugal)	B. Varela	23	2017	35	0	2022	Undisclosed	Originally from youth system
33	CB	(Brazil)	Jardel (VC)	32	2011 (Winter)	211	13	2020	Undisclosed	
34	RB	(Portugal)	A. Almeida	27	2012	196	4	2021	Undisclosed	
66	CB	(Portugal)	Rúben Dias	21	2017	29	3	2021	Youth system	Promoted from Benfica B
84	FW	(Portugal)	D. Gonçalves	21	2017	13	0	2021	Youth system	Promoted from Benfica B
90	MF	(Portugal)	J. Carvalho	21	2017	10	0	2021	Youth system	

- Ordered by squad number.

=== New contracts ===
No.	Pos	Player	Contract length	Contract end	Date	Source
19	LB	(Portugal) Eliseu	1 year	2018	19 July 2017	Benfica
34	RB	(Portugal) André Almeida	3 years	2021	11 August 2017	Benfica
5	DM	(Serbia) Ljubomir Fejsa	2 years	2021	11 September 2017	Benfica
—	CM	(Brazil) Talisca	1 year	2020	10 January 2018	Record
—	LB	(Portugal) Yuri Ribeiro	5 years	2023	19 May 2018	Benfica
9	FW	(Mexico) Raúl Jiménez	1 year	2021	Undisclosed	Record

=== Transfers ===
==== In ====
No.	Pos.	Nat.	Name	Age	Moving from	Type	Transfer window	Ends	Transfer fee	Source
14	FW	(Switzerland)	Haris Seferovic	25	(N/A) Free agent	Transfer	Summer	2022	€3.9M	BenficaA Bola
—	DF	(Brazil)	Patrick Vieira	26	(N/A) Free agent	Transfer	Summer	2020	Free	Record
20	MF	(Croatia)	Filip Krovinović	21	(Portugal) Rio Ave	Transfer	Summer	2022	€3.5M	Benfica zerozeroA Bola
42	CM	(Slovakia)	Martin Chrien	21	(Czech Republic) Viktoria Plzeň	Transfer	Summer	2022	Undisclosed	Benfica Viktoria Plzeň
84	FW	(Portugal)	Diogo Gonçalves	20	(Portugal) Benfica B	Promotion	Summer	2021	N/A	Benfica
66	CB	(Portugal)	Rúben Dias	20	(Portugal) Benfica B	Promotion	Summer	2021	N/A	Benfica
24	FW	(England)	Chris Willock	19	(N/A) Free agent	Transfer	Summer	2022	Free	Arsenal Benfica
90	MF	(Portugal)	João Carvalho	20	(Portugal) Vitória de Setúbal	Loan return	Summer	2021	N/A	O Jogo zerozero
28	FW	(Colombia)	Cristian Arango	22	(Colombia) Millonarios	Transfer	Summer	2022	Undisclosed	Benfica Millonarios
—	MF	(Portugal)	Salvador Agra	25	(Portugal) Nacional	Transfer	Summer	2020	Undisclosed	zerozero
30	GK	(Portugal)	Bruno Varela	22	(Portugal) Vitória de Setúbal	Transfer	Summer	2022	Undisclosed	Benfica
—	RB	(Croatia)	Mato Miloš	24	(Croatia) Istra 1961	Transfer	Summer	Undisclosed	€400k	Istra 1961
1	GK	(Belgium)	Mile Svilar	18	(Belgium) Anderlecht	Transfer	Summer	2022	€4.5M	Anderlecht Record
8	RB	(Brazil)	Douglas	27	(Spain) Barcelona	Loan	Summer	2018	Undisclosed	Benfica
11	FW	(Brazil)	Gabriel Barbosa	21	(Italy) Inter Milan	Loan	Summer	2018	€1.6M	Benfica SAPO Desporto
—	MF	(Sweden)	Erdal Rakip	21	(N/A) Free agent	Transfer	Winter	2023	Undisclosed	A Bola
Disclosed total
€13.9M

==== Out ====
No.	Pos.	Nat.	Name	Age	Moving to	Type	Transfer window	Transfer fee	Source
1	GK	(Brazil)	Ederson	23	(England) Manchester City	Transfer	Summer	€40M	BBC Sport Benfica Man City
—	MF	(Portugal)	Daniel Candeias	29	(Scotland) Rangers	Transfer	Summer	€800k	Benfica O Jogo Rangers
—	CM	(Italy)	Bryan Cristante	22	(Italy) Atalanta	Loan	Summer	Undisclosed	Record
14	CB	(Sweden)	Victor Lindelöf	22	(England) Manchester United	Transfer	Summer	€35M	Benfica Manchester United
—	DF	(Brazil)	Marçal	28	(France) Lyon	Transfer	Summer	€4.5M	Benfica Lyon
—	LW	(Portugal)	Nuno Santos	22	(Portugal) Rio Ave	Transfer	Summer	Undisclosed	Rio Ave
35	ST	(Serbia)	Luka Jović	19	(Germany) Eintracht Frankfurt	Loan	Summer	Undisclosed	Benfica Eintracht
—	MF	(Portugal)	Pedro Nuno	22	(Portugal) Tondela	Loan	Summer	Undisclosed	zerozero
63	MF	(Guinea-Bissau)	Pelé	25	(Portugal) Rio Ave	Transfer	Summer	Undisclosed	Rio Ave
95	LB	(Portugal)	Yuri Ribeiro	20	(Portugal) Rio Ave	Loan	Summer	Undisclosed	Rio Ave
—	FW	(Austria)	Kevin Friesenbichler	23	Austria Wien	Transfer	Summer	Undisclosed	Austria Wien
—	DF	(Brazil)	Patrick Vieira	26	(Portugal) Vitória de Setúbal	Loan	Summer	Undisclosed	Vitória de Setúbal
—	MF	(Portugal)	Salvador Agra	25	(Portugal) Desportivo das Aves	Loan^{[a]}	Summer	Undisclosed	Aves
50	RB	(Portugal)	Nélson Semedo	23	(Spain) Barcelona	Transfer	Summer	€30.5M	Barcelona Benfica
—	CM	(Colombia)	Guillermo Celis	24	(Portugal) Vitória de Guimarães	Transfer	Summer	€1M	Vitória de Guimarães zerozero
—	CB	(Brazil)	César	24	(Portugal) Vitória de Setúbal	Loan^{[b]}	Summer	Undisclosed	Vitória de Setúbal
—	FW	(Venezuela)	Jhon Murillo	21	(Turkey) Kasımpaşa	Loan	Summer	€400k	Kasımpaşa zerozero
—	FW	(Brazil)	Derley	29	(N/A) Free agent	Contract termination	Summer	N/A	Aves O Jogo
28	FW	(Colombia)	Cristian Arango	22	(Portugal) Desportivo das Aves	Loan	Summer	Undisclosed	zerozero
15	RW	(Peru)	André Carrillo	26	(England) Watford	Loan	Summer	Undisclosed	Benfica Watford
31	FW	(Brazil)	Victor Andrade	21	(Portugal) Estoril	Transfer	Summer	Undisclosed	Estoril
8	CM	(Portugal)	André Horta	20	(Portugal) Braga	Loan	Summer	Undisclosed	Benfica Braga
—	MF	(Argentina)	Luis Fariña	26	(N/A) Free agent	Contract termination	Summer	N/A	Aves zerozero
—	DF	(Croatia)	Mato Miloš	24	(Poland) Lechia Gdańsk	Loan	Summer	Undisclosed	Lechia Gdańsk
11	ST	(Greece)	Kostas Mitroglou	29	(France) Marseille	Transfer	Summer	€15M	Benfica Marseille zerozero
12	GK	(Brazil)	Júlio César	38	(N/A) Free agent	Contract termination	N/A	N/A	Benfica zerozero
38	LB	(Brazil)	Marcelo Hermes	22	(Brazil) Cruzeiro	Loan	Winter	Undisclosed	Cruzeiro Record
2	CB	(Argentina)	Lisandro López	28	(Italy) Inter Milan	Loan	Winter	Undisclosed	Benfica Inter Milan
—	MF	(Brazil)	Diego Lopes	23	(N/A) Free agent	Contract termination	Winter	N/A	Público Rio Ave
23	RB	(Portugal)	Pedro Pereira	19	(Italy) Genoa	Loan	Winter	Undisclosed	Genoa zerozero
—	MF	(Sweden)	Erdal Rakip	21	(England) Crystal Palace	Loan	Winter	Undisclosed	Crystal Palace
6	DM	(Brazil)	Filipe Augusto	24	(Turkey) Alanyaspor	Loan	Winter	Undisclosed	Alanyaspor
11	FW	(Brazil)	Gabriel Barbosa	21	(Italy) Inter Milan	Loan termination	Winter	N/A	O Jogo Santos
—	CB	(Brazil)	César	25	(Brazil) Juventude	Loan	Winter	Undisclosed	Juventude zerozero
—	MF	(Portugal)	Salvador Agra	26	(Spain) Granada	Loan	Winter	Undisclosed	Granada
Disclosed total
€127.2M

== Kit information ==
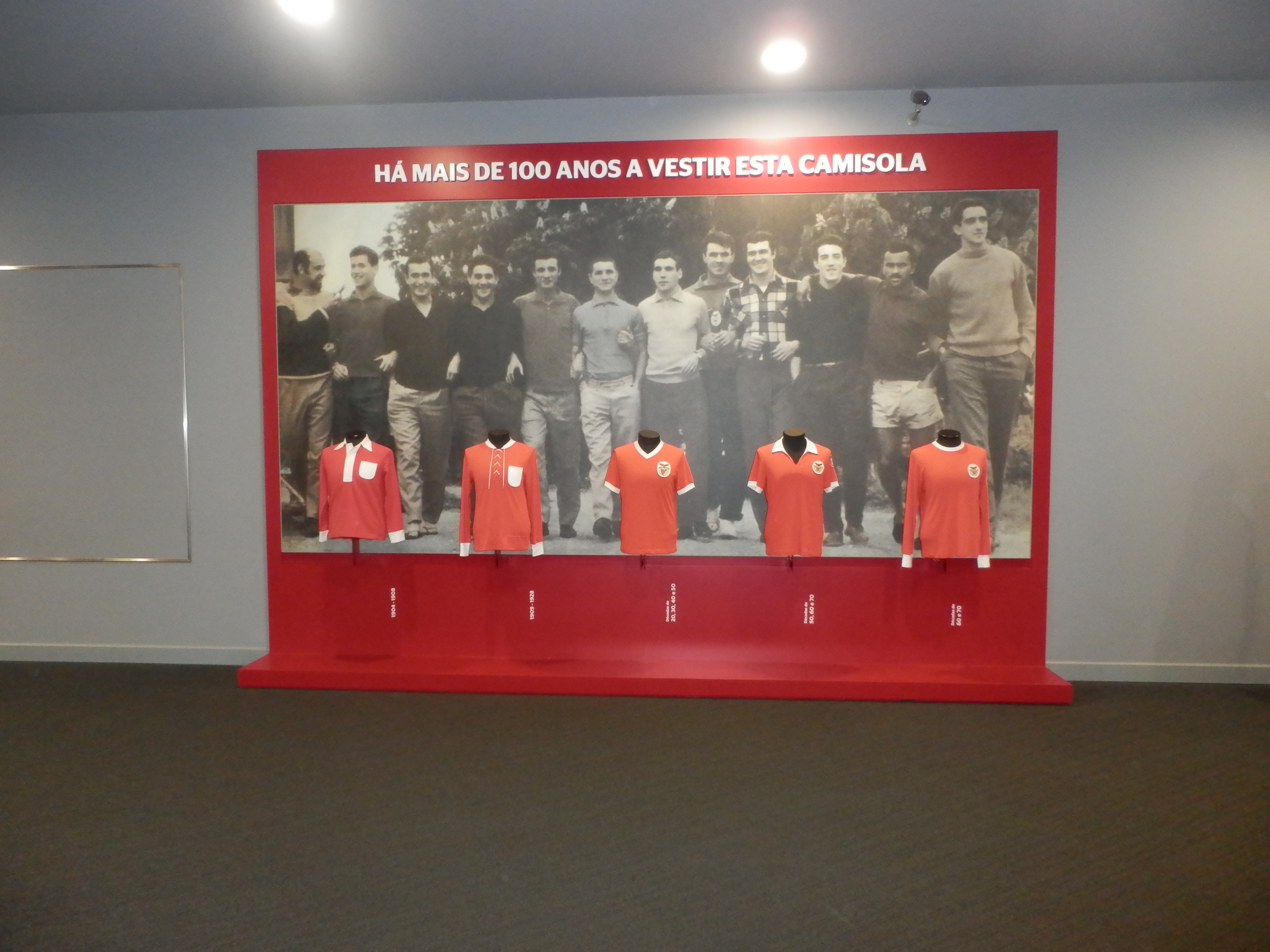
Benfica's 2017–18 home kit was inspired by one used in the 1960s (second from the right).

Supplier: Adidas

Sponsors: Emirates (front), Sagres (back)

Home kit: Inspired by a model used in the 1960s, this vivid red kit featured a classical design with a white polo collar and white sleeve cuffs. On the front, the manufacturer logo and the iconic sponsor phrase "Fly Emirates" were both white, as well as the beer brand logo on the back. The shirt also presented an embroidered symbol at the bottom, allusive to the 75th birthday of Eusébio. The shorts were white and the socks were in the same red shade as the shirt's. The first appearance of this kit was against Neuchâtel Xamax on 13 July.

Away kit: The alternative kit featured two tones of grey, with the body of the shirt being lighter and the sleeves and necktie (V-neck) darker. The three white Adidas' stripes were displayed vertically along the sides of the shirt. The club's badge was monochromatic and, just like in the previous seasons, it had the three stars above, each representing 10 league titles won by the club. The shorts were dark grey and the socks were predominantly light grey, with the exception of a horizontal stripe. The first appearance of this kit was against Real Betis on 20 July.

== Unofficial competitions ==
=== Pre-season ===
On 26 April 2017, it was announced that Benfica would take part in the Emirates Cup. It was the club's second participation in the tournament, after the presence in 2014. On 17 May, the schedule for the Uhrencup was announced; Benfica played against Neuchâtel Xamax and Young Boys. On 20 July, Benfica faced Real Betis in the Algarve Football Cup. On 30 June, Benfica announced their pre-season program, which included a standalone friendly match against Hull City on 22 July.

A match between Benfica and Chapecoense was announced on 21 April, to be played on 22 July as part of the annual Eusébio Cup, but it was cancelled on 13 June due to incompatibilities with the Brazilian's team schedule, according to the Brazilian Football Confederation.

Win Draw Loss

13 July 2017 Uhrencup	Benfica	2–0	Neuchâtel Xamax	Grenchen, Switzerland
20:00 CEST	Jonas 5' (pen.); Filipe Augusto (yellow card) 14'; Seferovic 19'			Stadium: Stadion Brühl; Referee: Vladimir Ocharov (Switzerland)

15 July 2017 Uhrencup	Benfica	1–5	Young Boys	Biel, Switzerland
17:00 CEST	Jonas 22' (yellow card) 31'		Assalé 25', 74'; Sulejmani 51'; Fassnacht 86', 89'	Stadium: Tissot Arena; Attendance: 5,200; Referee: Sascha Amhof (Switzerland)

20 July 2017 Algarve Football Cup	Benfica	2–1	Real Betis	Faro and Loulé
20:30 WEST	Seferovic 15', 50'		León 32'	Stadium: Estádio Algarve; Referee: Luís Godinho (Évora)

22 July 2017 Friendly	Benfica	0–1	Hull City	Faro and Loulé
20:30 WEST	Filipe Augusto (yellow card) 90+2'		Bowen 59'; Dawson (red card) 77'	Stadium: Estádio Algarve; Referee: Hélder Malheiro (Lisbon) & Nuno Almeida (Algarve)^{[c]}

29 July 2017 Emirates Cup	Arsenal	5–2	Benfica	London, England
16:20 BST	Walcott 24', 32'; López 52' (o.g.); Giroud 64'; Iwobi 70'		Cervi 11'; Eliseu (yellow card) 27'; Salvio 39'	Stadium: Emirates Stadium; Attendance: 54,538; Referee: Anthony Taylor (England)

30 July 2017 Emirates Cup	RB Leipzig	2–0	Benfica	London, England
16:20 BST	Halstenberg 19'; Compper 52'			Stadium: Emirates Stadium; Referee: Peter Green (Australia)

=== Regular season ===
On 8 September, the Eusébio Cup match was again announced, this time with Rangers as guests. It was scheduled to take place in Canada on 6 October, but Benfica announced its cancellation on 30 September due to the promoters' (Elite Soccer Entertainment) non-compliance with deadlines. "Unforeseen reasons and poor ticket sales" were the explanations given by the organising entity for the unexpected outcome.

== Competitions ==
=== Overall record ===
Performance by competition
Competition	Starting round	Final position/round	First match	Last match
Primeira Liga	—N/a	2nd	9 August 2017	13 May 2018
Taça de Portugal	Third round	Fifth round	14 October 2017	13 December 2017
Taça da Liga	Third round	Third round	20 September 2017	29 December 2017
Supertaça Cândido de Oliveira	—N/a	Winners	5 August 2017	
UEFA Champions League	Group stage	Group stage	12 September 2017	5 December 2017

Statistics by competition
Competition	Pld	W	D	L	GF	GA	GD	Win%	Top scorer(s)
Primeira Liga	34	25	6	3	79	22	+57	73.53	(Brazil) Jonas, 34
Taça de Portugal	3	2	0	1	5	3	+2	66.67	5 players, 1
Taça da Liga	3	0	3	0	5	5	+0	0.00	5 players, 1
Supertaça Cândido de Oliveira	1	1	0	0	3	1	+2	100.00	5 players, 1
UEFA Champions League	6	0	0	6	1	14	−13	0.00	(Switzerland) Haris Seferovic, 1
Total	47	28	9	10	93	45	+48	59.57	(Brazil) Jonas, 37

=== Supertaça Cândido de Oliveira ===
5 August 2017	Benfica	3–1	Vitória de Guimarães	Aveiro
20:45 WEST	Jonas 6'; Seferovic 11' (yellow card) 58'; Jiménez 83'		Raphinha 43'; Sá (yellow card) 88'; Martins (yellow card) 90+2'	Stadium: Estádio Municipal de Aveiro; Attendance: 29,100; Referee: Artur Soares Dias (Porto); Man of the Match: Pizzi

=== Primeira Liga ===
On 5 July 2017, Liga Portuguesa de Futebol Profissional announced nine stipulations for the Primeira Liga fixture draw that took place on 7 July. Among previous conditions, two new were added, with one directly concerning Benfica: the two teams who would play the Supertaça Cândido de Oliveira could not play against Sporting CP (Portuguese team in the UEFA Champions League play-off round) on the first two matchdays.

==== League table ====
Pos	Team	Pld	W	D	L	GF	GA	GD	Pts	Qualification or relegation
1	Porto (C)	34	28	4	2	82	18	+64	88	Qualification for the Champions League group stage
2	Benfica	34	25	6	3	80	22	+58	81	Qualification for the Champions League third qualifying round
3	Sporting CP	34	24	6	4	63	24	+39	78	Qualification for the Europa League group stage (Note: Desportivo das Aves qualified for the Europa league group stage by winning the 2017–18 Taça de Portugal. However, since they failed to obtain a license for European competitions, the spot awarded to the cup winners (Europa League group stage) was passed to the third-placed team, the spot awarded to the third-placed team (Europa League third qualifying round) was passed to the fourth-placed team, and the spot awarded to the fourth-placed team was passed to the fifth-placed team (Europa league second qualifying round).)
4	Braga	34	24	3	7	74	29	+45	75	Qualification for the Europa League third qualifying round
5	Rio Ave	34	15	6	13	40	42	−2	51	Qualification for the Europa League second qualifying round

Source: Liga Portugal
Rules for classification: 1) Points; 2) Head-to-head points; 3) Head-to-head goal difference; 4) Head-to-head away goals scored; 5) Goal difference; 6) Matches won; 7) Goals scored; 8) Play-off. (Note: only criteria 1, 5, 6 and 7 are applied to establish the classification during the competition.)
(C) Champions

==== Results by round ====
Round	1	2	3	4	5	6	7	8	9	10	11	12	13	14	15	16	17	18	19	20	21	22	23	24	25	26	27	28	29	30	31	32	33	34
Ground	H	A	H	A	H	A	H	A	A	H	A	H	A	H	A	H	A	A	H	A	H	A	H	A	H	H	A	H	A	H	A	H	A	H
Result	W	W	W	D	W	L	W	D	W	W	W	W	D	W	W	D	W	W	W	D	W	W	W	W	W	W	W	W	W	L	W	L	D	W
Position	2	2	1	3	3	4	3	3	3	3	3	3	3	3	3	3	3	3	3	3	2	2	2	2	2	2	2	1	1	2	2	2	2	2
Points	3	6	9	10	13	13	16	17	20	23	26	29	30	33	36	37	40	43	46	47	50	53	56	59	62	65	68	71	74	74	77	77	78	81

A = Away; H = Home; W = Win; D = Draw; L = Loss

==== Matches ====
9 August 2017 1	Benfica	3–1	Braga	Lisbon
21:00 WEST (UTC+01:00)	Seferovic 15'; Jonas 30' (yellow card) 52'; Eliseu (yellow card) 39'; Salvio 57'	Report	Fonte (yellow card) 29'; Jefferson (yellow card) 37'; Hassan 44'; Danilo (yellow card) 78'	Stadium: Estádio da Luz; Attendance: 58,826; Referee: Carlos Xistra (Castelo Branco)

14 August 2017 2	Chaves	0–1	Benfica	Chaves
21:00 WEST (UTC+01:00)	Pereira (yellow card) 90+5'	Report	Almeida (yellow card) 14'; Seferovic 90+3'; Jiménez (yellow card) 90+3'	Stadium: Estádio Municipal Eng. Manuel Branco Teixeira; Attendance: 8,480; Referee: Jorge Sousa (Porto)

19 August 2017 3	Benfica	5–0	Belenenses	Lisbon
20:30 WEST (UTC+01:00)	Jonas 2', 89', 90+3'; Salvio 27'; Seferovic 32'	Report	Hanin (yellow card) 53'	Stadium: Estádio da Luz; Attendance: 56,262; Referee: Rui Costa (Porto)

26 August 2017 4	Rio Ave	1–1	Benfica	Vila do Conde
20:30 WEST (UTC+01:00)	Barreto (yellow card) 31'; López 61' (o.g.); Nadjack (yellow card) 64'; Tarantini (yellow card) 66'; Marcelo (yellow card) 90+4'	Report	Filipe Augusto (yellow card) 55'; Jonas 67' (pen.); Živković (yellow card) 90+4'	Stadium: Estádio dos Arcos; Attendance: 8,614; Referee: Hugo Miguel (Lisbon)

8 September 2017 5	Benfica	2–1	Portimonense	Lisbon
21:00 WEST (UTC+01:00)	Jonas 60' (pen.); Almeida 78'	Report	Ewerton (yellow card) 21'; Sá (yellow card) 49'; Fabrício 56'; Hackman (red card) 59'; Paulinho (yellow card) 76'; Ferreira (yellow card) 84'	Stadium: Estádio da Luz; Attendance: 52,795; Referee: Gonçalo Martins (Vila Real)

16 September 2017 6	Boavista	2–1	Benfica	Porto
18:15 WEST (UTC+01:00)	Santos 55'; Espinho 74'; Vagner (yellow card) 84'; Vítor Bruno (yellow card) 90+2'	Report	Jonas 7'; Jiménez (yellow card) 90'	Stadium: Estádio do Bessa; Attendance: 12,312; Referee: Artur Soares Dias (Porto)

23 September 2017 7	Benfica	2–0	Paços de Ferreira	Lisbon
20:30 WEST (UTC+01:00)	Cervi 20'; Dias (yellow card) 44'; Živković (yellow card) 50'; Jonas 61'; Seferovic (yellow card) 68'	Report	Leão (yellow card) 90+1'	Stadium: Estádio da Luz; Attendance: 47,309; Referee: Carlos Xistra (Castelo Branco)

1 October 2017 8	Marítimo	1–1	Benfica	Funchal
20:15 WEST (UTC+01:00)	Pablo (yellow card) 10'; Costa (yellow card) 49'; Valente 66'	Report	Jonas 2'; Fejsa (yellow card) 13'	Stadium: Estádio dos Barreiros; Attendance: 9,537; Referee: Jorge Sousa (Porto)

22 October 2017 9	Desportivo das Aves	1–3	Benfica	Vila das Aves
18:00 WEST (UTC±00:00)	Defendi 75'	Report	Jonas 29' (pen.), 79' (pen.); Seferovic 50'; Salvio (yellow card) 59'; Pizzi (yellow card) 90+1'; Fejsa (yellow card) 90+2'	Stadium: Estádio do CD Aves; Attendance: 5,450; Referee: Nuno Almeida (Algarve)

27 October 2017 10	Benfica	1–0	Feirense	Lisbon
19:00 WEST (UTC±00:00)	Jonas 11'	Report	Alcénat (yellow card) 67'; Babanco (yellow card) 79'; Kakuba (yellow card) 90+1'	Stadium: Estádio da Luz; Attendance: 47,207; Referee: Luís Godinho (Évora)

5 November 2017 11	Vitória de Guimarães	1–3	Benfica	Guimarães
18:00 WET (UTC±00:00)	Martins 85'	Report	Jonas 22'; Fejsa (yellow card) 48'; Svilar (yellow card) 56'; Luisão (yellow card) 68'; Samaris 75'; Salvio 78'; Almeida (yellow card) 90+3'	Stadium: Estádio D. Afonso Henriques; Attendance: 25,702; Referee: Artur Soares Dias (Porto)

26 November 2017 12	Benfica	6–0	Vitória de Setúbal	Lisbon
20:15 WET (UTC±00:00)	Luisão 7'; Jonas 39', 66'; Grimaldo (yellow card) 45+1'; Salvio 47'; Almeida 67' (yellow card) 90+2'; Živković 86'	Report	Pinto (yellow card) 33' (yellow-red card) 44'	Stadium: Estádio da Luz; Attendance: 47,632; Referee: Luís Godinho (Évora)

1 December 2017 13	Porto	0–0	Benfica	Porto
20:30 WET (UTC±00:00)	Otávio (yellow card) 62'	Report	Luisão (yellow card) 36'; Živković (yellow card) 80' (yellow-red card) 82'	Stadium: Estádio do Dragão; Attendance: 49,809; Referee: Jorge Sousa (Porto)

9 December 2017 14	Benfica	3–1	Estoril	Lisbon
18:15 WET (UTC±00:00)	Salvio 13'; Jonas 19'; Krovinović 60'; Almeida (yellow card) 80'; Luisão (yellow card) 86'; Jardel (yellow card) 90'	Report	Halliche (yellow card) 20'; Kléber 45' (yellow card) 70'	Stadium: Estádio da Luz; Attendance: 49,520; Referee: João Pinheiro (Braga)

17 December 2017 15	Tondela	1–5	Benfica	Tondela
20:15 WET (UTC±00:00)	Tomané (yellow card) 64'; Heliardo (yellow card) 69'; Boyd 75'	Report	Fejsa (yellow card) 30'; Pizzi 16', 45+1'; Salvio 25'; Jonas 59', 78'; Jardel (yellow card) 69'	Stadium: Estádio João Cardoso; Attendance: 4,987; Referee: Tiago Martins (Lisbon)

3 January 2018 16	Benfica	1–1	Sporting CP	Lisbon
21:30 WET (UTC±00:00)	Fejsa (yellow card) 64'; Jonas 90' (pen.)	Report	Martins 18'; Coates (yellow card) 68'; Bruno César (yellow card) 85'; Battaglia (yellow card) 89'	Stadium: Estádio da Luz; Attendance: 61,996; Referee: Hugo Miguel (Lisbon)

7 January 2018 17	Moreirense	0–2	Benfica	Moreira de Cónegos
16:00 WET (UTC±00:00)	Sagna (yellow card) 48'	Report	Pizzi 23'; Jonas 73'	Stadium: Parque de Jogos Comendador Joaquim de Almeida Freitas; Attendance: 4,507; Referee: Manuel Mota (Braga)

13 January 2018 18	Braga	1–3	Benfica	Braga
20:30 WET (UTC±00:00)	Esgaio (yellow card) 41'; Paulinho 74'; Teixeira (yellow card) 85'	Report	Salvio 11'; Almeida (yellow card) 52'; Pizzi (yellow card) 56'; Jonas 64'; Fejsa (yellow card) 89'; Jiménez 90+1'	Stadium: Estádio Municipal de Braga; Attendance: 20,407; Referee: Artur Soares Dias (Porto)

20 January 2018 19	Benfica	3–0	Chaves	Lisbon
18:15 WET (UTC±00:00)	Jonas 12', 19'; Pizzi 47'	Report		Stadium: Estádio da Luz; Attendance: 57,383; Referee: Bruno Esteves (Setúbal)

29 January 2018 20	Belenenses	1–1	Benfica	Lisbon
21:00 WET (UTC±00:00)	Viana (yellow card) 34'; Yebda (yellow card) 60'; Sousa (yellow card) 78'; Nathan 86'; Fredy (yellow card) 90+4'; Hanin (yellow card) 90+7'; Sasso (yellow card) (after match); Chaby (red card) (after match)	Report	Salvio (yellow card) 34'; Jonas 90+7'	Stadium: Estádio do Restelo; Attendance: 9,268; Referee: Bruno Paixão (Setúbal)

3 February 2018 21	Benfica	5–1	Rio Ave	Lisbon
18:15 WET (UTC±00:00)	Jardel 48'; Pizzi 63'; Jonas 71' (yellow card) 73'; Dias 82'; Jiménez 86'	Report	Guedes 8'; Teles (yellow card) 44'; Monte (yellow card) 76'	Stadium: Estádio da Luz; Attendance: 53,828; Referee: Manuel Oliveira (Porto)

10 February 2018 22	Portimonense	1–3	Benfica	Portimão
20:30 WET (UTC±00:00)	Sá (yellow card) 31'; Tabata (yellow card) 48'; Possignolo (yellow card) 61'; Macedo 65'	Report	Cervi 6', 77'; Pizzi (yellow card) 41'; Grimaldo (yellow card) 84'; Živković 90+5'	Stadium: Estádio Municipal de Portimão; Attendance: 6,000; Referee: Carlos Xistra (Castelo Branco)

17 February 2018 23	Benfica	4–0	Boavista	Lisbon
18:15 WET (UTC±00:00)	Dias 18'; Jardel (yellow card) 30' (goal) 44'; Henrique 77' (o.g.); Gonçalves (yellow card) 79'; Jiménez 90'	Report		Stadium: Estádio da Luz; Attendance: 56,884; Referee: Tiago Martins (Lisbon)

24 February 2018 24	Paços de Ferreira	1–3	Benfica	Paços de Ferreira
20:30 WET (UTC±00:00)	Luiz Phellype 9'; Assis (yellow card) 60'; Quiñones (yellow card) 87'; Gian (red card) 90+1'	Report	Živković (yellow card) 16'; Pizzi (yellow card) 49'; Jonas 73', 88'; Silva 90+4'	Stadium: Estádio Capital do Móvel; Attendance: 8,810; Referee: Fábio Veríssimo (Leiria)

3 March 2018 25	Benfica	5–0	Marítimo	Lisbon
18:15 WET (UTC±00:00)	Jonas 16', 35', 42'; Grimaldo 22'; Živković 81'; Pizzi (yellow card) 90'	Report	Santos (yellow card) 41'; Bebeto (yellow card) 54'; Gamboa (red card) 55'; Baiano (yellow card) 90+2'	Stadium: Estádio da Luz; Attendance: 52,460; Referee: Hélder Malheiro (Lisbon)

10 March 2018 26	Benfica	2–0	Desportivo das Aves	Lisbon
11:45 WET (UTC±00:00)	Dias (yellow card) 52' (goal) 75'; Jonas 71'; Fejsa (yellow card) 90+3'	Report	Lenho (yellow card) 24'; Gomes (yellow card) 70'; Figueiró (yellow card) 73'; Machado (yellow card) 90+1'	Stadium: Estádio da Luz; Attendance: 50,050; Referee: Rui Costa (Porto)

17 March 2018 27	Feirense	0–2	Benfica	Santa Maria da Feira
18:15 WEST (UTC+01:00)	Silva (yellow card) 14' (yellow-red card) 41'; Alcénat (yellow card) 62'; Paraíba (yellow card) 71'; Briseño (red card) 87'	Report	Grimaldo (yellow card) 28'; Jiménez 60'; Dias (yellow card) 66'; Silva 75'	Stadium: Estádio Marcolino de Castro; Attendance: 5,449; Referee: Manuel Mota (Braga)

31 March 2018 28	Benfica	2–0	Vitória de Guimarães	Lisbon
18:15 WEST (UTC+01:00)	Jonas 45' (pen.), 78'; Fejsa (yellow card) 55'; Jardel (yellow card) 61'	Report	Mattheus (yellow card) 44'; Raphinha (yellow card) 44'; Jubal (yellow card) 72'	Stadium: Estádio da Luz; Attendance: 56,402; Referee: Carlos Xistra (Castelo Branco)

7 April 2018 29	Vitória de Setúbal	1–2	Benfica	Setúbal
20:30 WEST (UTC+01:00)	Costinha 3'; Pereira (yellow card) 86'; Luís Felipe (yellow card) 90+1'	Report	Dias (yellow card) 21'; Jiménez 28', 90+2' (pen.) (yellow card) 90+2'	Stadium: Estádio do Bonfim; Attendance: 13,739; Referee: Luís Godinho (Évora)

15 April 2018 30	Benfica	0–1	Porto	Lisbon
18:00 WEST (UTC+01:00)	Almeida (yellow card) 62'; Grimaldo (yellow card) 81'	Report	Oliveira (yellow card) 39'; Otávio (yellow card) 59'; Telles (yellow card) 72'; Herrera 90' (yellow card) 90+1'	Stadium: Estádio da Luz; Attendance: 63,526; Referee: Artur Soares Dias (Porto)

21 April 2018 31	Estoril	1–2	Benfica	Estoril
20:30 WEST (UTC+01:00)	Ailton (yellow card) 24'; Allano (yellow card) 50'; Halliche 63'; Eduardo (yellow card) 74'; Valente (yellow card) 86'	Report	Silva 8'; Almeida (yellow card) 72'; Salvio 90+2' (yellow card) 90+2'; Varela (yellow card) 90+5'	Stadium: Estádio António Coimbra da Mota; Attendance: 6,415; Referee: Hugo Miguel (Lisbon)

28 April 2018 32	Benfica	2–3	Tondela	Lisbon
18:15 WEST (UTC+01:00)	Pizzi 12'; Cervi (yellow card) 32'; Luisão (yellow card) 54'; Salvio 90+4'	Report	Cardoso 30', 39'; Fernandes (yellow card) 45+1'; Tomané (yellow card) 61' (goal) 81'; Ramos (yellow card) 69'	Stadium: Estádio da Luz; Attendance: 50,547; Referee: Nuno Almeida (Algarve)

5 May 2018 33	Sporting CP	0–0	Benfica	Lisbon
20:30 WEST (UTC+01:00)	Piccini (yellow card) 61'; Fernandes (yellow card) 90+5'; Mišić (yellow card) 90+7'	Report	Jardel (yellow card) 71'	Stadium: Estádio José Alvalade; Attendance: 49,339; Referee: Carlos Xistra (Castelo Branco)

13 May 2018 34	Benfica	1–0	Moreirense	Lisbon
18:00 WEST (UTC+01:00)	Živković (yellow card) 38'; Luisão (yellow card) 41'; Jonas 52' (pen.); Salvio (yellow card) 84'	Report	Neto (yellow card) 23'; Sagna (yellow card) 63'; Peña (yellow card) 64'; Tozé (yellow card) 73'	Stadium: Estádio da Luz; Attendance: 41,926; Referee: Fábio Veríssimo (Leiria)

=== Taça de Portugal ===
==== Third round ====
14 October 2017	Olhanense	0–1	Benfica	Faro and Loulé
19:00 WEST (UTC+01:00)	Léléco (yellow card) 79'		Barbosa 4'	Stadium: Estádio Algarve; Referee: Bruno Paixão (Setúbal)

==== Fourth round ====
18 November 2017	Benfica	2–0	Vitória de Setúbal	Lisbon
18:15 WET (UTC+01:00)	Cervi 25'; Pizzi (yellow card) 45'; Krovinović 81'		Podstawski (yellow card) 37'	Stadium: Estádio da Luz; Referee: João Capela (Lisbon)

==== Fifth round ====
13 December 2017	Rio Ave	3–2 (a.e.t.)	Benfica	Vila do Conde
21:00 WET (UTC+01:00)	Marcelo (yellow card) 31'; Lionn 47'; Ribeiro (yellow card) 56' (goal) 62'; Tarantini (yellow card) 59'; Monte (yellow card) 83'; Guedes 94'; Cássio (yellow card) 120'		Luisão (yellow card) 29' (goal) 86'; Jonas 36'; Almeida (yellow card) 44'; Živković (yellow card) 89'	Stadium: Estádio dos Arcos; Referee: Fábio Veríssimo (Leiria)

=== Taça da Liga ===
==== Third round ====
Initially, Real was drawn into group A of the Taça da Liga; however, due to the irregular use of Abou Touré, the Disciplinary Committee of the Portuguese Football Federation awarded the team with an administrative loss in their second round match. After reformulation, Real was replaced by Portimonense.

Matches 2 and 3 were originally intended to be played on 25 October and 29 November, respectively, but were rescheduled to 20 and 29 December.

Pos	Team	Pld	W	D	L	GF	GA	GD	Pts	Qualification	VSE	BEN	PRT	BRA
1	Vitória de Setúbal	3	2	1	0	6	4	+2	7	Advance to knockout phase	—	2–2	—	2–1
2	Benfica	3	0	3	0	5	5	0	3		—	—	2–2	1–1
3	Portimonense	3	0	2	1	5	6	−1	2		1–2	—	—	—
4	Braga	3	0	2	1	4	5	−1	2		—	—	2–2	—

Source: LPFP
Rules for classification: Tiebreakers

20 September 2017 1	Benfica	1–1	Braga	Lisbon
21:15 WET (UTC±00:00)	Jiménez 11'; Samaris (yellow card) (after match)	Report	Teixeira (yellow card) 53'; Ferreira 68'; Paulinho (yellow card) (after match)	Stadium: Estádio da Luz; Attendance: 24,160; Referee: Bruno Esteves (Setúbal)

20 December 2017 2	Benfica	2–2	Portimonense	Lisbon
19:15 WET (UTC±00:00)	Jonas 1'; López 33'	Report	Rosell (yellow card) 37'; Pires 46'; Inácio (yellow card) 65'; Jadson 84'; Sá (yellow card) 90+6'	Stadium: Estádio da Luz; Attendance: 21,355; Referee: Manuel Oliveira (Porto)

29 December 2017 3	Vitória de Setúbal	2–2	Benfica	Setúbal
21:15 WET (UTC±00:00)	Fernandes 30'; Pinto 39'; Trigueira (yellow card) 90+2'	Report	Filipe Augusto (yellow card) 24'; Seferovic 52'; Dias 58'; Eliseu (yellow card) 80'; Samaris (yellow card) 82'; Živković (yellow card) 90+3'	Stadium: Estádio do Bonfim; Attendance: 2,736; Referee: Luís Ferreira (Braga)

=== UEFA Champions League ===
==== Group stage ====
Pos	Team	Pld	W	D	L	GF	GA	GD	Pts	Qualification	MUN	BSL	CSKA	BEN
1	(England) Manchester United	6	5	0	1	12	3	+9	15	Advance to knockout phase	—	3–0	2–1	2–0
2	(Switzerland) Basel	6	4	0	2	11	5	+6	12	Advance to knockout phase	1–0	—	1–2	5–0
3	(Russia) CSKA Moscow	6	3	0	3	8	10	−2	9	Transfer to Europa League	1–4	0–2	—	2–0
4	(Portugal) Benfica	6	0	0	6	1	14	−13	0		0–1	0–2	1–2	—

Source: UEFA
Rules for classification: Group stage tiebreakers

12 September 2017 1	Benfica	1–2	(Russia) CSKA Moscow	Lisbon, Portugal
20:45 CEST (UTC+02:00)	Seferovic 50' (yellow card) 80'; Almeida (yellow card) 62'	Report	Golovin (yellow card) 43'; Vitinho 63' (pen.); Zhamaletdinov 71'; Dzagoev (yellow card) 73'; Wernbloom (yellow card) 75'	Stadium: Estádio da Luz; Attendance: 38,323; Referee: Alberto Undiano Mallenco (Spain)

27 September 2017 2	Basel (Switzerland)	5–0	Benfica	Basel, Switzerland
20:45 CEST (UTC+02:00)	Lang 2'; Oberlin 20', 69'; Akanji (yellow card) 45+1'; Petretta (yellow card) 50'; Xhaka (yellow card) 55'; Van Wolfswinkel 60' (pen.); Riveros 77'	Report	Živković (yellow card) 55'; Salvio (yellow card) 59'; Almeida (red card) 62'	Stadium: St. Jakob-Park; Attendance: 34,111; Referee: Craig Thomson (Scotland)

18 October 2017 3	Benfica	0–1	(England) Manchester United	Lisbon, Portugal
20:45 CEST (UTC+02:00)	Luisão (yellow card) 5' (yellow-red card) 90+2'; Gonçalves (yellow card) 54'	Report	Valencia (yellow card) 41'; Rashford 64'; Lingard (yellow card) 90+5'	Stadium: Estádio da Luz; Attendance: 57,684; Referee: Felix Zwayer (Germany)

31 October 2017 4	Manchester United (England)	2–0	Benfica	Manchester, England
20:45 CET (UTC+01:00)	Bailly (yellow card) 24'; Lingard (yellow card) 24'; Svilar 45' (o.g.); Blind 78' (pen.)	Report	Dias (yellow card) 6'; Salvio (yellow card) 69'; Samaris (yellow card) 77'	Stadium: Old Trafford; Attendance: 74,437; Referee: Gediminas Mažeika (Lithuania)

22 November 2017 5	CSKA Moscow (Russia)	2–0	Benfica	Moscow, Russia
18:00 CET (UTC+01:00)	Shchennikov 13'; Wernbloom (yellow card) 29'; Jardel 56' (o.g.); Nababkin (yellow card) 70'; Natkho (yellow card) 72'	Report	Eliseu (yellow card) 31'; Luisão (yellow card) 61'	Stadium: VEB Arena; Attendance: 27,709; Referee: Deniz Aytekin (Germany)

5 December 2017 6	Benfica	0–2	(Switzerland) Basel	Lisbon, Portugal
20:45 CET (UTC+01:00)	Samaris (yellow card) 68'	Report	Elyounoussi 5'; Xhaka (yellow card) 9'; Akanji (yellow card) 63'; Oberlin 65'; Petretta (yellow card) 75'	Stadium: Estádio da Luz; Attendance: 22,470; Referee: Jesús Gil Manzano (Spain)

== Statistics ==
Benfica used a total of 28 players during the 2017–18 season, with one being from the B squad. Three players did not make a first-team appearance in the campaign: Lopes, Branimir Kalaica and Chris Willock. Pizzi featured in 45 matches – the most of any squad member.

The team scored a total of 93 goals (including 1 own goal) in all competitions and there were 17 different goalscorers. The season's top scorer was Jonas, with 37 goals.

Nineteen players were booked during the season. Three of them were sent off: Almeida, Luisão and Živković.

=== Appearances and goals ===
No.	Pos.	Nat.	Player	Primeira Liga			Taça de Portugal			Taça da Liga			Supertaça			Champions League			Total		
1	GK	(Belgium)	Mile Svilar	3	0	-2	1	0	0	2	0	-3	—			3	0	-5	9	0	-10
3	DF	(Spain)	Álex Grimaldo	28	0	1	3	0	0	1	0	0	1	0	0	4	0	0	37	0	1
4	DF	(Brazil)	Luisão	16	0	1	3	0	1	0	0	0	1	0	0	4	0	0	24	0	2
5	MF	(Serbia)	Ljubomir Fejsa	27	0	0	2	0	0	0	0	0	1	0	0	4	0	0	34	0	0
7	MF	(Greece)	Andreas Samaris	4	14	1	1	0	0	3	0	0	0	0	0	2	1	0	10	15	1
8	DF	(Brazil)	Douglas	2	2	0	2	0	0	1	0	0	—			3	0	0	8	2	0
9	FW	(Mexico)	Raúl Jiménez	6	27	6	0	2	0	1	1	1	0	1	1	3	2	0	10	33	8
10	FW	(Brazil)	Jonas	29	1	34	2	0	1	1	1	1	1	0	1	3	3	0	36	5	37
13	GK	(Portugal)	Paulo Lopes	0	0	0	0	0	0	0	0	0	0	0	0	0	0	0	0	0	0
14	FW	(Switzerland)	Haris Seferovic	9	11	4	1	1	0	1	1	1	1	0	1	2	2	1	14	15	7
16	DF	(Croatia)	Branimir Kalaica	0	0	0	0	0	0	0	0	0	0	0	0	—			0	0	0
17	MF	(Serbia)	Andrija Živković	17	4	3	0	1	0	2	1	0	0	0	0	3	2	0	22	8	3
18	MF	(Argentina)	Eduardo Salvio	19	7	9	1	0	0	1	0	0	1	0	0	4	1	0	26	8	9
19	DF	(Portugal)	Eliseu	6	0	0	0	0	0	2	0	0	0	1	0	2	1	0	10	2	0
20	MF	(Croatia)	Filip Krovinović	9	4	1	3	0	1	2	1	0	0	0	0	—			14	5	2
21	MF	(Portugal)	Pizzi	31	2	6	3	0	0	1	1	0	1	0	0	6	0	0	42	3	6
22	MF	(Argentina)	Franco Cervi	29	2	3	2	0	1	0	0	0	1	0	0	1	2	0	33	4	4
24	FW	(England)	Chris Willock	0	0	0	0	0	0	0	0	0	0	0	0	—			0	0	0
27	MF	(Portugal)	Rafa Silva	13	7	3	2	0	0	2	0	0	0	0	0	0	1	0	17	8	3
30	GK	(Portugal)	Bruno Varela	29	0	-19	2	0	-3	0	1	-1	1	0	-1	2	0	-4	34	1	-28
33	DF	(Brazil)	Jardel	26	0	2	2	0	0	1	0	0	1	0	0	4	0	0	34	0	2
34	DF	(Portugal)	André Almeida	31	0	2	1	1	0	2	0	0	1	0	0	3	1	0	38	2	2
42	MF	(Slovakia)	Martin Chrien	0	1	0	0	1	0	0	0	0	0	0	0	—			0	2	0
55	MF	(United States)	Keaton Parks (B)	1	3	0	0	1	0	0	1	0	—						1	5	0
66	DF	(Portugal)	Rúben Dias	23	0	3	1	0	0	3	0	1	0	0	0	2	0	0	29	0	4
84	FW	(Portugal)	Diogo Gonçalves	3	4	0	0	1	0	0	1	0	0	0	0	4	0	0	7	6	0
90	FW	(Portugal)	João Carvalho	2	5	0	0	1	0	1	0	0	0	0	0	1	0	0	4	6	0
Players transferred out during the season
2	DF	(Argentina)	Lisandro López	2	2	0	0	0	0	2	0	1	0	0	0	2	0	0	6	2	1
6	MF	(Brazil)	Filipe Augusto	5	3	0	0	0	0	2	0	0	0	1	0	3	0	0	10	4	0
11	FW	(Brazil)	Gabriel Barbosa	0	1	0	1	0	1	1	0	0	—			0	2	0	2	3	1
12	GK	(Brazil)	Júlio César	2	0	-1	0	0	0	1	0	-1	0	0	0	1	0	-5	4	0	-7

(B) – Benfica B player

=== Hat-tricks ===
Player	Against	Result	Date	Competition
(Brazil) Jonas	Belenenses	5–0 (H)	19 August 2017	Primeira Liga
(Brazil) Jonas	Marítimo	5–0 (H)	3 March 2018	Primeira Liga

(H) – Home; (A) – Away

=== Clean sheets ===
No.	Player	Primeira Liga	Taça de Portugal	Taça da Liga	Supertaça	Champions League	Total
1	(Belgium) Mile Svilar	1	1	0		0	2
12	(Brazil) Júlio César	1		0		0	1
30	(Portugal) Bruno Varela	13	1	(0)	0	0	14
Totals		15	2	0	0	0	17

The number in parentheses represents the shared match on match 3 against Vitória de Setúbal, where Varela was the goalkeeper who was substituted on, whilst Svilar was the one on the field at the start of play.

=== Disciplinary record ===
No.	Pos.	Player	Primeira Liga		Taça de Portugal	Taça da Liga	Supertaça	Champions League			Total		
No.	Pos.	Player	Yellow card	(yellow card) (yellow-red card)	Yellow card	Yellow card	Yellow card	Yellow card	(yellow card) (yellow-red card)	Red card	Yellow card	(yellow card) (yellow-red card)	Red card
1	GK	(Belgium) Mile Svilar	1								1		
3	DF	(Spain) Álex Grimaldo	4								4		
4	DF	(Brazil) Luisão	5		1			1	1		7	1	
5	MF	(Serbia) Ljubomir Fejsa	8								8		
6	MF	(Brazil) Filipe Augusto	1			1					2		
7	MF	(Greece) Andreas Samaris				2		2			4		
9	FW	(Mexico) Raúl Jiménez	3								3		
10	FW	(Brazil) Jonas	2								2		
14	FW	(Switzerland) Haris Seferovic	1				1	1			3		
17	MF	(Serbia) Andrija Živković	4	1	1	1		1			7	1	
18	MF	(Argentina) Eduardo Salvio	4					2			6		
19	DF	(Portugal) Eliseu	1			1		1			3		
21	MF	(Portugal) Pizzi	5		1						6		
22	MF	(Argentina) Franco Cervi	1								1		
30	GK	(Portugal) Bruno Varela	1								1		
33	DF	(Brazil) Jardel	5								5		
34	DF	(Portugal) André Almeida	7		1			1		1	9		1
66	DF	(Portugal) Rúben Dias	4					1			5		
84	FW	(Portugal) Diogo Gonçalves	1					1			2		
Totals			55	1	4	5	1	11	1	1	76	2	1

== Awards ==
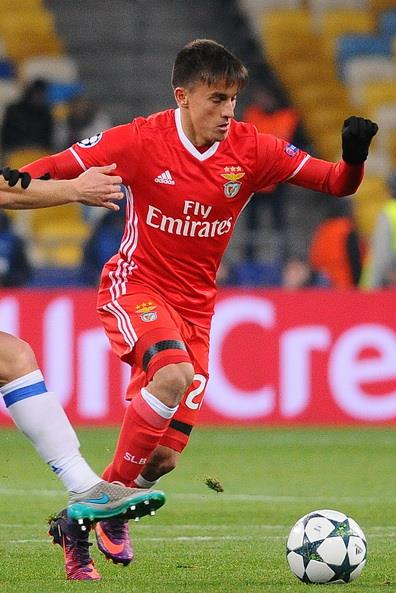
Franco Cervi scored Liga NOS Goal of the Month against Portimonense in February.

=== Player ===
No.	Pos	Name	Award	Period	Ref
10	FW	(Brazil) Jonas	Samsung/Liga NOS Player of the Month	October/November	
10	FW	(Brazil) Jonas	Samsung/Liga NOS Player of the Month	December	
10	FW	(Brazil) Jonas	Samsung/Liga NOS Player of the Month	January	
10	FW	(Brazil) Jonas	Samsung/Liga NOS Player of the Month	February	
10	FW	(Brazil) Jonas	Samsung/Liga NOS Player of the Month	March	
10	FW	(Brazil) Jonas	Liga NOS Forward of the Month	January	
10	FW	(Brazil) Jonas	Liga NOS Forward of the Month	February	
10	FW	(Brazil) Jonas	Liga NOS Forward of the Month	March	
10	FW	(Brazil) Jonas	SJPF Primeira Liga Team of the Year	2017	
10	FW	(Brazil) Jonas	Cosme Damião Award – Footballer of the Year	2017	
10	FW	(Brazil) Jonas	Bola de Prata	2017–18	
21	MF	(Portugal) Pizzi	SJPF Primeira Liga Team of the Year	2017	
22	MF	(Argentina) Franco Cervi	Liga NOS Goal of the Month	February	
30	GK	(Portugal) Bruno Varela	SJPF Young Player of the Month	December	
30	GK	(Portugal) Bruno Varela	Liga NOS Goalkeeper of the Month	March	
66	DF	(Portugal) Rúben Dias	Cosme Damião Award – Revelation	2017	
66	DF	(Portugal) Rúben Dias	Liga NOS Defender of the Month	March	
66	DF	(Portugal) Rúben Dias	LPFP Breakthrough Player	2017–18	

=== Manager ===
Name	Award	Year	Ref
(Portugal) Rui Vitória	Liga NOS Manager of the Month	January	
(Portugal) Rui Vitória	Cosme Damião Award – Coach of the Year	2017	

== Notes ==
a. On 31 January 2018, Agra's season-long loan at Desportivo das Aves was terminated.
b. On 12 January 2018, César's season-long loan at Vitória de Setubal was terminated by mutual agreement.
c. Amid FPF's experiments with video assistant referee (VAR), Hélder Malheiro officiated in the first half and Nuno Almeida in the second one.
