= 2017 Emirates Cup =

Tournament details
- Host country: England
- City: London
- Dates: 29 – 30 July
- Teams: 4 (from 1 confederation)
- Venue: 1 (in 1 host city)

Final positions
- Champions: Arsenal (5th title)
- Runners-up: Sevilla
- Third place: RB Leipzig
- Fourth place: Benfica

Tournament statistics
- Matches played: 4
- Goals scored: 13 (3.25 per match)
- Top scorer: Theo Walcott (2 goals)

The 2017 Emirates Cup was a pre-season football friendly tournament hosted by Arsenal at its home ground, the Emirates Stadium. It was the ninth Emirates Cup, an invitational competition inaugurated in 2007. Held on the weekend of 29–30 July 2017, the participants were Arsenal, Sevilla, Benfica, and RB Leipzig. It was the first edition since 2015 as pitch reconstruction works put the tournament on hiatus in 2016.

Each team played two matches, with three points awarded for a win, one point for a draw and none for a loss. An additional point is awarded for every goal scored. Arsenal did not face RB Leipzig, and Benfica did not play against Sevilla. On the first day of the Emirates Cup, Sevilla defeated RB Leipzig by a single goal, while Arsenal came from behind to beat Benfica 5–2. Although Sevilla were victorious against Arsenal and took maximum points, the hosts won the competition due to scoring more goals over the two days. RB Leipzig beat Benfica by two goals to finish in third place.

== Background ==
The Emirates Cup was inaugurated in July 2007 after Arsenal finalised plans to stage a pre-season competition at its home ground. The competition is named after Arsenal's main sponsor Emirates; the airline's association with the football club began in 2004. Arsenal won the first tournament, which was attended by over 110,000 people across the two days. In 2016, the Emirates Cup was cancelled in order to facilitate essential pitch reconstruction works at the Emirates Stadium. The 2017 edition was televised live in the United Kingdom on Quest and ESPN Deportes in the United States.

== Summary ==
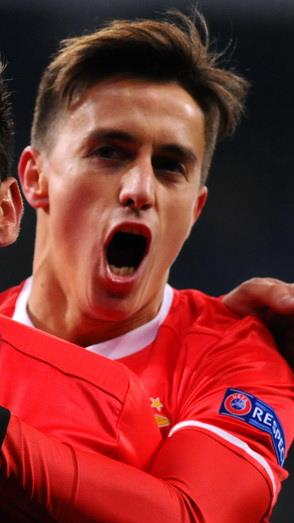
Benfica's Franco Cervi featured in the tournament and scored against Arsenal.

RB Leipzig faced Sevilla in the opening match of the tournament; the German side were without striker Timo Werner, but manager Ralph Hasenhüttl named new signing Jean-Kevin Augustin in his first eleven. Midfielder Emil Forsberg forced Sevilla goalkeeper Sergio Rico into action early on with a shot, but the ball was comfortably held on to. RB Leipzig continued to create chances and in the 18th minute a ball played over the Sevilla defence found Augustin. The forward's volley however flew over the goal and into the stand. Sevilla's first meaningful attack just after the half-hour mark resulted in a penalty. Bernardo's challenge on Walter Montoya in the penalty area was adjudged as a foul, despite video replays showing the defender managed to take the ball off the Sevilla midfielder. Wissam Ben Yedder stepped up to take the penalty and duly converted to give Sevilla the lead. The scoreline remained 1–0, despite both clubs' best efforts to score.

Arsenal played Benfica in the later game. The hosts went behind early on; Pizzi's long pass in the Arsenal box was headed downwards by Jonas and reached Franco Cervi, whose effort deflected off Per Mertesacker and into the net. Theo Walcott responded by scoring twice in nine minutes, but Eduardo Salvio equalised for the Portuguese champions just before the break. In the second half Arsenal scored three goals – first, an own goal by Lisandro López, then a well-worked move finished off by striker Olivier Giroud and finally Alex Iwobi whose shot went into the roof of the net. New signing Sead Kolašinac was involved in the build-up play for three of the goals; Arsenal manager Arsène Wenger, afterwards, said of his contribution: "Today he was influential, the first two goals came from him. He looks powerful and the timing of his availability going forward is very good."

On the second day of the tournament RB Leipzig beat Benfica by two goals. Halstenberg opened the score in the 19th minute, combining well with Federico Palacios before shooting the ball into the top left corner of the net. RB Leipzig made sure of victory in the second half when Marvin Compper scored. From Dominik Kaiser's free-kick, the defender headed the ball beyond Benifca goalkeeper Bruno Varela. RB Leipzig ended the tournament in third place with five points, whereas Benfica finished bottom of the table on two points. Hasenhüttl was delighted with his team's performance, telling reporters: "I am proud of how our young players performed. The constant regaining of possession was key to the win."

Arsenal went into the final day of the competition knowing a draw was enough to win the Emirates Cup. Alexandre Lacazette started for Arsenal, as did Mesut Özil, while Ben Yedder continued to lead the line for Sevilla in a front three – either side of Nolito and Joaquín Correa. After an uneventful first half which saw both sides create few chances, Sevilla took the lead when Ben Yedder's reverse ball found an incoming Correa who slotted the ball past Petr Čech. Lacazette equalised for Arsenal, but the hosts went behind again after Steven Nzonzi's long shot looped into the far top corner. Sevilla held on to win, but despite a 100% record they finished second because Arsenal's points and goal difference was identical to theirs, and the Spanish club had scored fewer goals over the two days.

== Standings ==
Each team plays two matches, with three points awarded for a win, one point for a draw, and a point for every goal scored.

Pos	Team	Pld	W	D	L	GF	GA	GD	Pts
1	(England) Arsenal	2	1	0	1	6	4	+2	9
2	(Spain) Sevilla	2	2	0	0	3	1	+2	9
3	(Germany) RB Leipzig	2	1	0	1	2	1	+1	5
4	(Portugal) Benfica	2	0	0	2	2	7	−5	2

== Matches ==
29 July 2017
14:00 BST

RB Leipzig (Germany)	0–1	(Spain) Sevilla
	Report	Ben Yedder 35' (pen.)

Emirates Stadium, London
Referee: Stuart Attwell (England)
29 July 2017
16:20 BST

Arsenal (England)	5–2	(Portugal) Benfica
Walcott 25', 33'; López 52' (o.g.); Giroud 64'; Iwobi 71'	Report	Cervi 12'; Salvio 40'

Emirates Stadium, London
Referee: Anthony Taylor (England)

30 July 2017
14:00 BST

RB Leipzig (Germany)	2–0	(Portugal) Benfica
Halstenberg 19'; Compper 53'	Report

Emirates Stadium, London
Referee: Peter Green (Australia)
30 July 2017
16:20 BST

Arsenal (England)	1–2	(Spain) Sevilla
Lacazette 62'	Report	Correa 49'; Nzonzi 69'

Emirates Stadium, London
Referee: Andre Marriner (England)

== Goalscorers ==
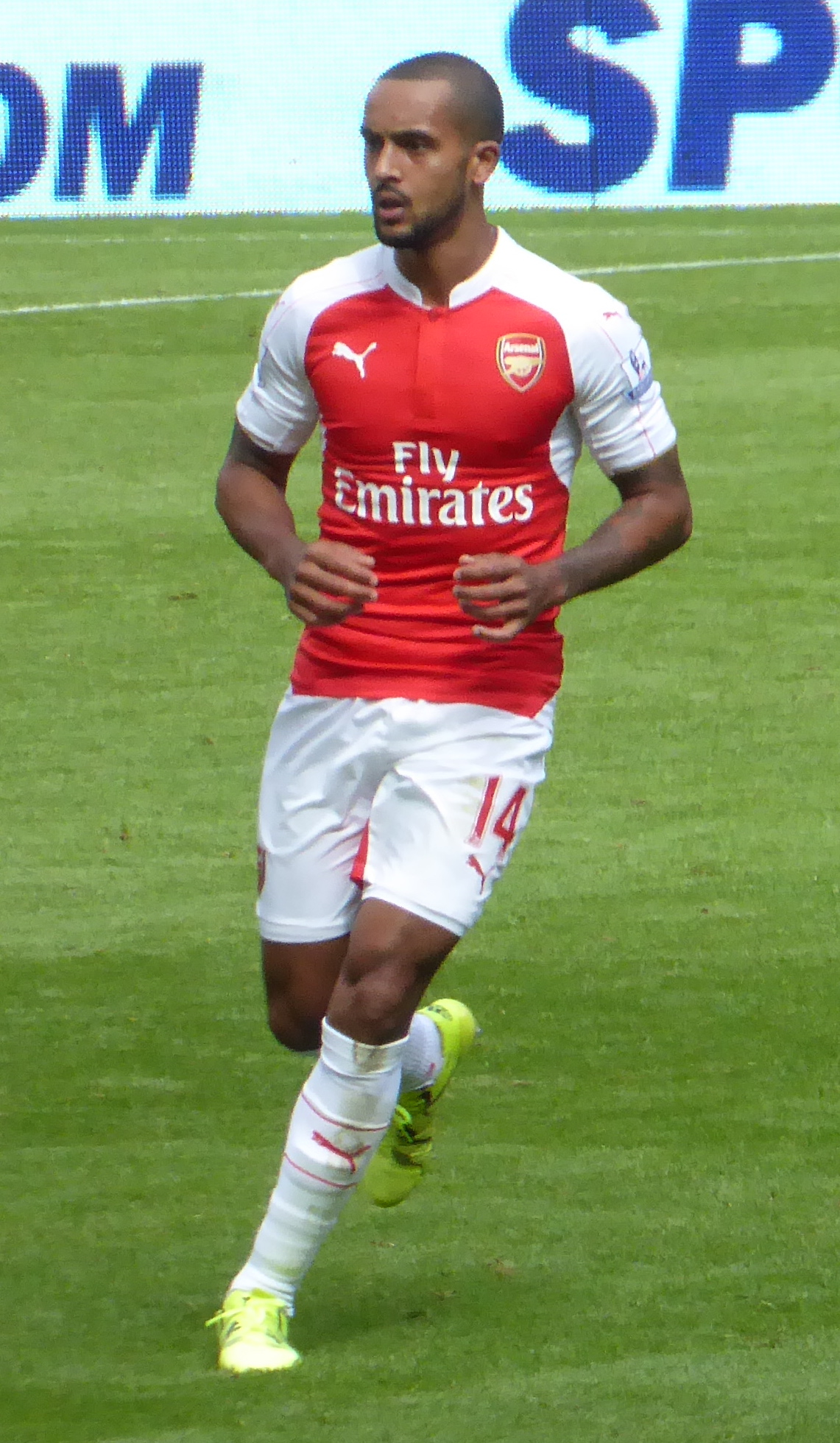
Theo Walcott was the tournament's topscorer, with two goals.

Rank	Name	Team	Goals
1	(England) Theo Walcott	Arsenal	2
2	(France) Wissam Ben Yedder	Sevilla	1
2	(Argentina) Franco Cervi	Benfica	1
2	(Germany) Marvin Compper	RB Leipzig	1
2	(Argentina) Joaquín Correa	Sevilla	1
2	(France) Olivier Giroud	Arsenal	1
2	(Germany) Marcel Halstenberg	RB Leipzig	1
2	(Nigeria) Alex Iwobi	Arsenal	1
2	(France) Alexandre Lacazette	Arsenal	1
2	(France) Steven Nzonzi	Sevilla	1
2	(Argentina) Eduardo Salvio	Benfica	1
