= Matheus Mascarenhas =

Brazilian footballer

Personal information
- Full name: Matheus Mascarenhas dos Santos Raimundo
- Date of birth: 27 July 1998 (age 28)
- Place of birth: São João de Meriti, Brazil
- Height: 1.80 m (5 ft 11 in)
- Position: Left back

Youth career
- –2017: Fluminense

Senior career*
Years	Team	Apps	(Gls)
2017–2022	Fluminense	11	(1)
2018	→ Botafogo-SP (loan)	11	(0)
2018	→ Atlético Goianiense (loan)	19	(0)
2020–2021	→ Vitória de Guimarães (loan)	0	(0)
2021	→ Sampaio Corrêa (loan)	11	(0)
2022	Confiança	3	(0)
2023–2024	FC U Craiova	42	(0)

International career
2015	Brazil U17	2	(0)
Medal record
Representing Brazil
Winner	South American U-17 Championship	2015
- * Club domestic league appearances and goals as of 13 May 2024

Matheus Mascarenhas dos Santos Raimundo (born 27 July 1998), commonly known as Matheus Mascarenhas, is a Brazilian professional footballer who plays as a left back.

== International career ==
Matheus Mascarenhas represented Brazil at the 2015 South American Under-17 Football Championship.

== Career statistics ==
As of 12 May 2024.

Club	Season	League			State League		Cup		Continental		Other		Total	
Club	Season	Division	Apps	Goals	Apps	Goals	Apps	Goals	Apps	Goals	Apps	Goals	Apps	Goals
Fluminense	2017	Série A	4	1	0	0	0	0	—		—		4	1
Fluminense	2018	Série A	0	0	0	0	0	0	—		—		0	0
Fluminense	2019	Série A	1	0	6 (Note: Appearances in the Campeonato Carioca)	0	1	0	0	0	—		8	0
Fluminense	Total		5	1	6	0	1	0	0	0	—		12	1
Botafogo-SP (loan)	2018	Série C	0	0	11 (Note: Appearances in the Campeonato Paulista)	0	—		—		—		11	0
Atlético Goianiense (loan)	2018	Série B	19	0	—		—		—		—		19	0
Vitória Guimarães (loan)	2020–21	Primeira Liga	0	0	—		0	0	—		0	0	0	0
Sampaio Corrêa (loan)	2021	Série B	11	0	—		—		—		—		11	0
Confiança	2022	Série C	3	0	5 (Note: Appearances in the Campeonato Sergipano)	0	—		—		—		8	0
FC U Craiova	2022–23	Liga I	15	0	—		1	0	—		2 (Note: Appearance in Liga I European play-offs)	0	18	0
FC U Craiova	2023–24	Liga I	27	0	—		3	0	—		—		30	0
FC U Craiova	Total		42	0	—		4	0	—		2	0	48	0
Career total			76	1	17	0	5	0	0	0	2	0	100	1

== Honours ==
Fluminense

- Campeonato Carioca runner-up: 2017, 2021

Brazil U17

- South American U-17 Championship: 2015
