= Zié Ouattara =

Ivorian footballer

Personal information
- Full name: Zié Mohamed Ouattara
- Date of birth: 9 January 2000 (age 26)
- Place of birth: Abidjan, Ivory Coast
- Height: 1.76 m (5 ft 9 in)
- Position: Right-back

Team information
- Current team: Radomiak Radom
- Number: 24

Youth career
- ASEC Mimosas

Senior career*
Years	Team	Apps	(Gls)
2018–2022	Vitória Guimarães B	27	(0)
2020–2022	Vitória Guimarães	10	(0)
2022–2023	Portimonense	22	(1)
2023–2024	União de Leiria	33	(4)
2024–	Radomiak Radom	60	(5)

International career
2019	Ivory Coast U23	2	(0)
- * Club domestic league appearances and goals as of 22:36, 29 May 2026 (UTC)

Zié Mohamed Ouattara (born 9 January 2000) is an Ivorian professional footballer who plays as right-back for Polish club Radomiak Radom.

== Club career ==
A youth product of ASEC Mimosas, Ouattara transferred to Vitória S.C. on 30 January 2018. Ouattara made his professional debut with Vitória B in a 3–2 LigaPro loss to F.C. Penafiel on 9 December 2018.

== International career ==
Ouattara debuted for the Ivory Coast U23s in a pair of 2019 Africa U-23 Cup of Nations qualification matches in March 2019.

== Honours ==
Ivory Coast U23

- Africa U-23 Cup of Nations runner-up: 2019
