= Bruno Varela =

Cape Verdean footballer (born 1994)

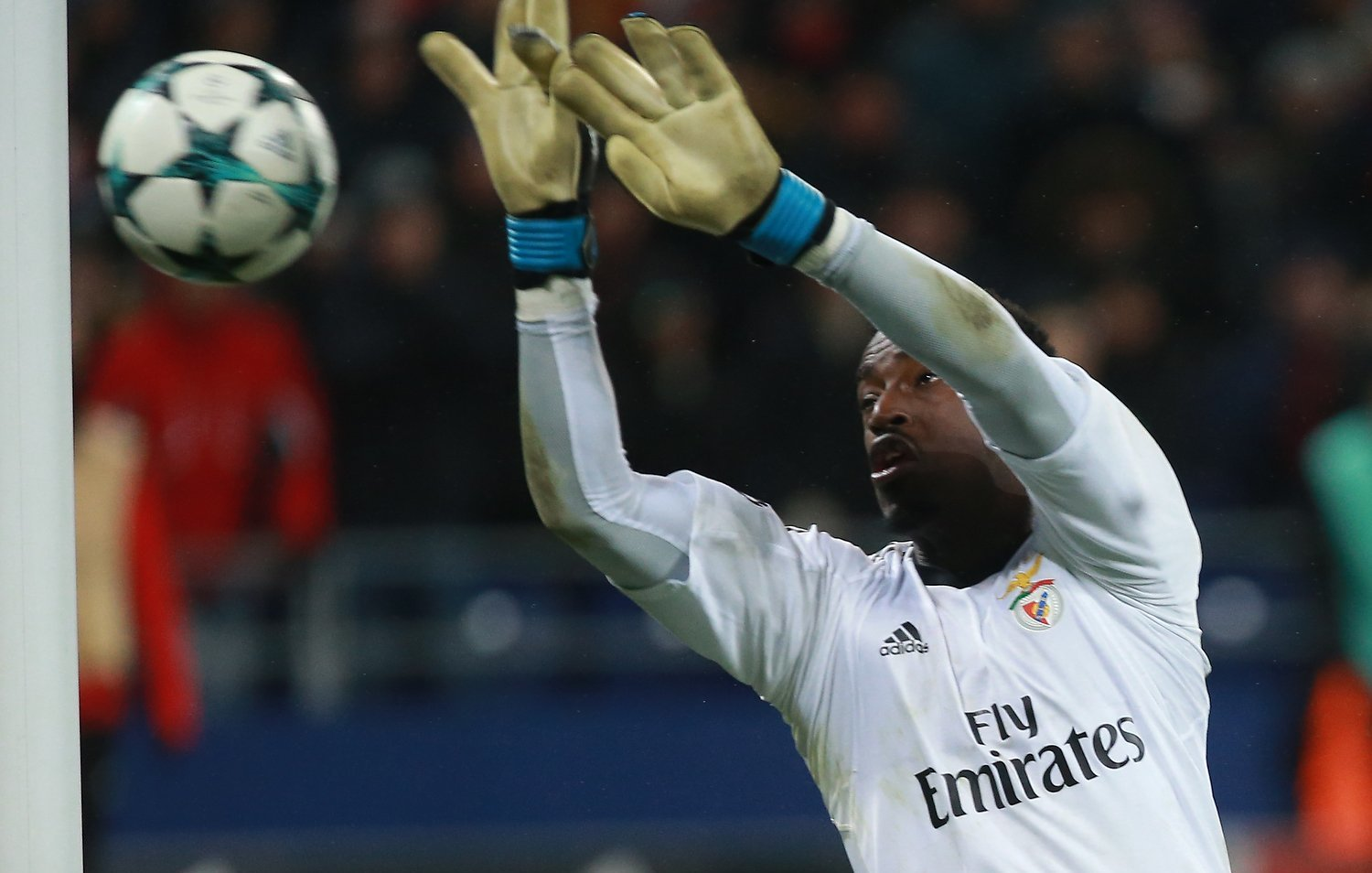
- Varela with Benfica in 2017

Personal information
- Full name: Bruno Miguel Semedo Varela
- Date of birth: 4 November 1994 (age 32)
- Place of birth: Lisbon, Portugal
- Height: 1.91 m (6 ft 3 in)
- Position: Goalkeeper

Youth career
- 2002–2006: Ponte Frielas
- 2006–2013: Benfica

Senior career*
Years	Team	Apps	(Gls)
2012–2016	Benfica B	85	(0)
2015–2016	→ Valladolid (loan)	1	(0)
2016–2017	Vitória Setúbal	29	(0)
2017–2020	Benfica	29	(0)
2019–2020	→ Ajax (loan)	1	(0)
2019–2020	→ Jong Ajax (loan)	2	(0)
2020–2025	Vitória Guimarães	144	(0)
2025–2026	Al-Hazem	20	(0)

International career^{‡}
2009–2010	Portugal U16	3	(0)
2010–2011	Portugal U17	7	(0)
2011–2012	Portugal U18	6	(0)
2012–2013	Portugal U19	11	(0)
2012–2013	Portugal U20	11	(0)
2014–2017	Portugal U21	11	(0)
2016	Portugal U23	4	(0)
2023–	Cape Verde	8	(0)
Medal record
Men's football
Representing Portugal
UEFA European Under-21 Championship
Runner-up	2015 Czech Republic
- * Club domestic league appearances and goals as of 02:33, 19 October 2026 (UTC) ‡ National team caps and goals as of 22:45, 21 May 2026 (UTC)

Bruno Miguel Semedo Varela (Portuguese: [ˈbɾu.nu mi.ˈɡɛl sɨ.ˈme.du vɐ.ˈɾɛ.lɐ]; born 4 November 1994) is a professional footballer who plays as a goalkeeper for the Cape Verde national team.

He represented Benfica, Vitória de Setúbal and Vitória de Guimarães in the Primeira Liga. Abroad, he played with Valladolid in Spain, Ajax in the Netherlands and Al-Hazem in Saudi Arabia.

Across all age groups, Varela earned 53 international caps for Portugal, and was part of their under-23 team at the 2016 Olympics. In October 2023, he switched allegiance to Cape Verde.

== Club career ==
=== Benfica ===
Born in Lisbon and of Cape Verdean descent, Varela joined local club S.L. Benfica's youth system at the age of 11. On 22 September 2012, whilst still a junior, he made his professional debut, appearing for the reserves in a 2–0 away win against C.D. Aves in the Segunda Liga.

From 2013 to 2015, with the team still in the second division, Varela was the undisputed starter. His competitive input with the main squad consisted of nine bench appearances, the first of which occurred on 29 August 2011 in a Primeira Liga match at C.D. Nacional when he was just 16 years old.

On 29 August 2015, Varela was loaned to Real Valladolid in a season-long move. Barred by Athletic Bilbao youth product Kepa Arrizabalaga, he appeared in only one official game for the Spaniards during his spell, the 1–3 Segunda División home loss to RCD Mallorca in the last matchday.

=== Vitória Setúbal ===
On 2 July 2016, Varela left Benfica and signed with fellow top-flight side Vitória F.C. until June 2021. He made his debut in the competition on 21 August on his return to the Estádio da Luz, a 1–1 draw against the reigning champions.

=== Return to Benfica ===
In July 2017, Varela agreed on a return to Benfica for a fee of around €100,000. He made his competitive debut on 5 August, starting in the 3–1 victory over Vitória S.C. in the Supertaça Cândido de Oliveira. His first appearance in the UEFA Champions League took place on 12 September, in a 1–2 group stage home loss to PFC CSKA Moscow.

On 16 September 2017, Varela committed a blunder which resulted in a 2–1 away defeat against Boavista FC. He was quickly deemed surplus to requirements by manager Rui Vitória, with the club acquiring Mile Svilar and Odisseas Vlachodimos in the following weeks; however, after the former went down with influenza and the latter was only due to arrive in January, he was made the starter again, notably receiving Player of the match accolades in a 0–0 away draw with FC Porto.

On 26 January 2019, without a single competitive appearance, Varela was loaned to Dutch Eredivisie club AFC Ajax until the end of the season, with the option to buy. On 24 June, the move was extended for another year.

Mainly a reserve player during his tenure in Amsterdam, Varela made his competitive debut for Ajax on 22 January 2020 in the 7–0 home demolition of SV Spakenburg in the round of 16 of the KNVB Cup. His first league match occurred four days later, in a 2–1 away loss against FC Groningen.

=== Vitória Guimarães ===
On 19 August 2020, Varela returned to Portugal and joined Vitória S.C. on a four-year deal. He missed the start of his second season due to a right thigh tear, during which Matouš Trmal had a run in the team. In May 2023, he signed a new contract until 2026.

Varela totalled 174 games during his tenure. This included 14 in the 2024–25 UEFA Conference League, where his side was ousted in the round of 16 by Spain's Real Betis.

=== Al-Hazem ===
On 26 August 2025, Varela signed for Saudi Pro League club Al-Hazem F.C. on a two-year contract.

== International career ==
=== Portugal ===
Varela represented Portugal at the 2013 UEFA European Under-19 Championship and at the 2013 FIFA U-20 World Cup, being a backup to José Sá in the latter tournament. He was also part of the under-20 squad at the 2014 Toulon Tournament, starting in an eventual third-place finish.

Varela again played understudy to Sá during the 2015 European Under-21 Championship, failing to appear for the runners-up. He was first choice during the 2016 Summer Olympics competition, in an eventual quarter-final run.

On 21 March 2017, Varela received his first call-up to the Portugal senior side, replacing the injured Anthony Lopes for the 2018 FIFA World Cup qualifier against Hungary and a friendly with Sweden to be held later that month. In October 2020, he replaced the same player after he tested had positive for COVID-19.

=== Cape Verde ===
On 4 October 2023, Varela received a call-up to the Cape Verde national team for friendlies against Algeria and Comoros. He won his first cap eight days later, in a 5–1 away loss to the former; he rejected to be selected for the delayed 2023 Africa Cup of Nations finals, however, on the grounds that he had not taken part in the qualification campaign.

== Career statistics ==
As of match played 18 May 2024

Appearances and goals by club, season and competition
Club	Season	Domestic League			National cup		League cup		Continental		Other		Total	
Club	Season	Division	Apps	Goals	Apps	Goals	Apps	Goals	Apps	Goals	Apps	Goals	Apps	Goals
Benfica B	2012–13	Segunda Liga	12	0	—		—		—		—		12	0
Benfica B	2013–14	Segunda Liga	38	0	—		—		—		—		38	0
Benfica B	2014–15	Segunda Liga	35	0	—		—		—		—		35	0
Benfica B	Total		85	0	—		—		—		—		85	0
Valladolid (loan)	2015–16	Segunda División	1	0	0	0	—		—		—		1	0
Vitória Setúbal	2016–17	Primeira Liga	29	0	0	0	1	0	—		—		30	0
Benfica	2017–18	Primeira Liga	29	0	2	0	1	0	2 (Note: Appearances in UEFA Champions League)	0	1 (Note: Appearance in Supertaça Cândido de Oliveira)	0	35	0
Benfica	2018–19	Primeira Liga	0	0	0	0	0	0	0	0	—		0	0
Benfica	Total		29	0	2	0	1	0	2	0	1	0	35	0
Ajax (loan)	2018–19	Eredivisie	0	0	0	0	0	0	0	0	—		0	0
Ajax (loan)	2019–20	Eredivisie	1	0	1	0	—		1 (Note: Appearance in UEFA Europa League)	0	0	0	3	0
Ajax (loan)	Total		1	0	1	0	0	0	1	0	0	0	3	0
Jong Ajax (loan)	2019–20	Eerste Divisie	2	0	—		—		—		—		2	0
Vitória Guimarães	2020–21	Primeira Liga	31	0	2	0	0	0	—		—		33	0
Vitória Guimarães	2021–22	Primeira Liga	25	0	2	0	2	0	—		—		29	0
Vitória Guimarães	2022–23	Primeira Liga	27	0	0	0	1	0	4 (Note: Appearances in UEFA Europa Conference League)	0	—		32	0
Vitória Guimarães	2023–24	Primeira Liga	27	0	1	0	1	0	2	0	—		31	0
Vitória Guimarães	Total		110	0	5	0	4	0	6	0	—		125	0
Career total			257	0	8	0	6	0	9	0	1	0	281	0

== Honours ==
Benfica

- Supertaça Cândido de Oliveira: 2017

Ajax

- KNVB Cup: 2018–19
- Johan Cruyff Shield: 2019

International

- UEFA European Under-21 Championship runner-up: 2015
