= Nicolas Janvier =

French footballer (born 1998)

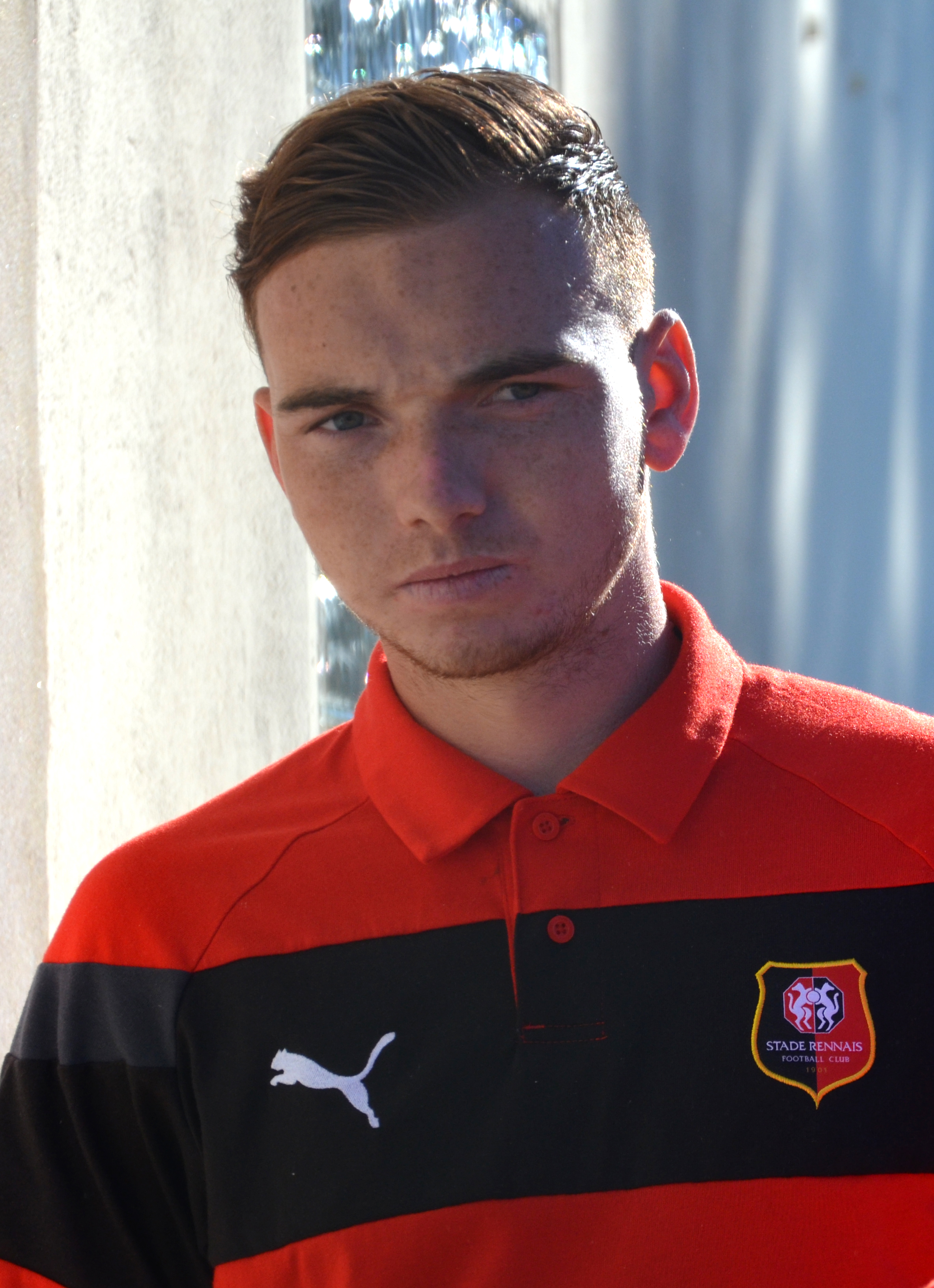
- Nicolas Janvier with Rennes in 2016

Personal information
- Full name: Nicolas Jean-Paul Noël Janvier
- Date of birth: 11 August 1998 (age 28)
- Place of birth: Saint-Malo, France
- Height: 1.71 m (5 ft 7 in)
- Position: Midfielder

Team information
- Current team: Esenler Erokspor
- Number: 7

Youth career
- 2004–2006: Jeanne d'Arc Saint Malo
- 2006–2015: Rennes

Senior career*
Years	Team	Apps	(Gls)
2015–2019	Rennes II	58	(8)
2015–2019	Rennes	11	(0)
2019–2020	Vitória SC B	23	(8)
2020–2023	Vitória SC	69	(3)
2023–2026	Alanyaspor	94	(6)
2026–	Esenler Erokspor	9	(0)

International career
2013–2014	France U16	12	(4)
2014–2015	France U17	13	(3)
2015–2016	France U18	9	(5)
2016–2017	France U19	16	(4)
2017–2018	France U20	3	(0)
- * Club domestic league appearances and goals as of 10 October 2026

Nicolas Jean-Paul Noël Janvier (born 11 August 1998) is a French professional footballer who plays as a midfielder for Turkish TFF 1. Lig club Esenler Erokspor.

== Club career ==
Born in Saint-Malo, Brittany, Janvier moved from hometown club Jeanne d'Arc to Stade Rennais F.C. at the age of 8, a year after starting to play football. He made his Ligue 1 debut on 11 December 2015 against SM Caen, as an 84th-minute substitute for Juan Fernando Quintero in a 1–1 home draw.

Janvier signed his first professional contract in August 2015, a three-year deal that made him only the third 17-year-old to turn professional at Rennes, after Yoann Gourcuff and Damien Le Tallec. He made only 15 appearances in all competitions (four starts), being used mainly in the reserve team in the Championnat National 3 and 2. He left in August 2019 on a three-year deal to Vitória SC in Portugal's Primeira Liga.

Janvier was again a reserve in his first year in Portugal, scoring 8 goals in 23 games including braces in wins over CDC Montalegre and Berço SC. He made his Primeira Liga debut on 18 September 2020, playing the full 90 minutes of a 1–0 home loss to B-SAD, the first game managed by Tiago Mendes.

On 4 July 2023, Janvier signed a three-year contract for Turkish club Alanyaspor, for an undisclosed fee.

== International career ==
Janvier earned 53 caps for France at youth level, scoring 16 goals. He made his debut on 17 September 2013 with the under-16 team in a 1–0 friendly win over Wales in La Sauvetat-du-Dropt, and scored in a 6–0 win against the same country two days later. He was part of the under-17 team that won the 2015 UEFA European Championship in Bulgaria, though he missed in the semi-final penalty shootout against Belgium.

== Honours ==
France

- UEFA European Under-17 Championship: 2015
