= André André =

Portuguese footballer

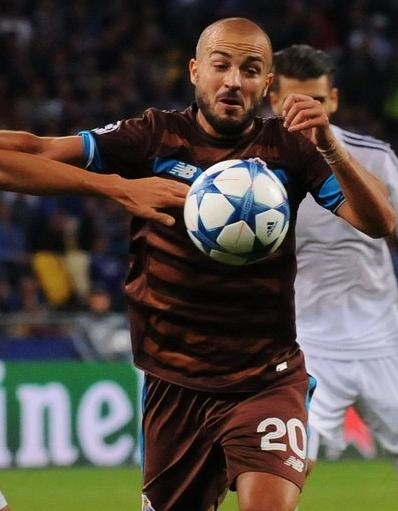
- André playing for Porto in 2015

Personal information
- Full name: André Filipe Brás André
- Date of birth: 26 August 1989 (age 37)
- Place of birth: Vila do Conde, Portugal
- Height: 1.74 m (5 ft 9 in)
- Position: Midfielder

Youth career
- 1999–2007: Varzim
- 2007–2008: Porto

Senior career*
Years	Team	Apps	(Gls)
2008–2010	Varzim	49	(6)
2010–2011	Deportivo La Coruña B	3	(0)
2011–2012	Varzim	37	(12)
2012–2015	Vitória Guimarães	81	(16)
2014	Vitória Guimarães B	1	(0)
2015–2018	Porto	65	(3)
2018–2024	Vitória Guimarães	116	(18)
2022	→ Al-Ittihad (loan)	12	(0)
2024–2025	Leixões	27	(2)
Total		391	(57)

International career
2008	Portugal U19	1	(0)
2015	Portugal	4	(1)
- * Club domestic league appearances and goals

André Filipe Brás André (born 26 August 1989) is a Portuguese former professional footballer who played as a midfielder.

After starting his career at Varzim, he made 262 Primeira Liga appearances for Vitória de Guimarães and Porto, winning a league title with the latter in 2018.

== Club career ==
=== Varzim ===
Born in Vila do Conde, André was brought up at Porto and Varzim. He made his senior debut with the latter in 2008, going on to total six goals in 49 Segunda Liga games over two seasons.

In the first half of the 2010–11 campaign, André joined Deportivo de La Coruña B in Spain on a 2+2 contract, suffering relegation from Segunda División B (only three appearances), a fate which also befell his previous team. He returned to Varzim in January 2011.

André netted 12 times from his midfield position in 2011–12, to help Varzim return to the second division after just one year. No promotion eventually befell, however, due to irregularities.

=== Vitória Guimarães ===
In summer 2012, André signed with Vitória de Guimarães of the Primeira Liga. In his first year, he contributed five scoreless appearances in the Taça de Portugal as the club won the competition for the first time in its history. On 27 April 2014, he was one of four first-teamers parachuted into the B team for a crucial 2–1 home win over promotion rivals Vizela.

André scored 11 goals in the 2014–15 season – eight from penalties– as the Minho Province side finished fifth and qualified for the UEFA Europa League. Highlights included a hat-trick in a 4–0 home win against Nacional, on 4 January 2015.

=== Porto ===
André returned to Porto in June 2015 after eight years, agreeing to a four or five-year deal. In late September, in two home games separated by nine days, he scored his first competitive goals with the club, helping to victories over Benfica (1–0) and Chelsea (2–1), the latter in the group stage of the UEFA Champions League.

In the 2017–18 campaign, André played 13 matches to help his team win the national championship after a five-year wait.

=== Return to Vitória ===
André returned to Guimarães on 4 July 2018. On his debut on 10 August, he scored in a 3–2 loss at Benfica, and fifteen days later on his return to the Estádio do Dragão, he netted a penalty as his team overturned a half-time deficit to beat Porto 3–2.

On 21 March 2021, André extended his contract at the Estádio D. Afonso Henriques up to June 2024. The following January, however, he was loaned to Saudi Professional League club Al-Ittihad with a €1 million buying option.

=== Later career ===
André joined second-tier Leixões on 30 July 2024, as a free agent.

== International career ==
André represented Portugal at under-19 level. He made his debut with the full side on 31 March 2015, coming on as a 66th-minute substitute for Adrien Silva in a 2–0 friendly defeat against Cape Verde in Estoril.

André scored his only goal on 17 November 2015, finishing Vieirinha's cross to open a 2–0 win over Luxembourg at the Stade Josy Barthel.

== Personal life ==
André's father, António, was also a footballer and a midfielder. He represented Porto for more than one decade, and appeared with Portugal at the 1986 FIFA World Cup.

== Career statistics ==
=== Club ===
As of match played on 24 April 2023

Club	Season	League			Cup		League Cup		Europe		Other		Total	
Club	Season	Division	Apps	Goals	Apps	Goals	Apps	Goals	Apps	Goals	Apps	Goals	Apps	Goals
Varzim	2008–09	Liga de Honra	25	2	2	1	1	0	—		—		28	3
Varzim	2009–10	Liga de Honra	24	4	2	0	2	0	—		—		28	4
Varzim	Total		49	6	4	1	3	0	—		—		56	7
Deportivo B	2010–11	Segunda División B	3	0	—		—		—		—		3	0
Varzim	2010–11	Liga de Honra	4	0	0	0	—		—		—		4	0
Varzim	2011–12	Segunda Divisão	33	12	1	0	—		—		—		34	12
Varzim	Total		37	12	1	0	—		—		—		39	12
Vitória Guimarães	2012–13	Primeira Liga	24	1	5	0	2	0	—		—		31	1
Vitória Guimarães	2013–14	Primeira Liga	26	4	2	0	2	0	6 (Note: Appearances in UEFA Europa League)	1	1 (Note: Appearances in Supertaça Cândido de Oliveira)	0	37	5
Vitória Guimarães	2014–15	Primeira Liga	31	11	2	2	1	0	—		—		34	13
Vitória Guimarães	Total		81	16	9	2	5	0	6	1	1	0	102	19
Porto	2015–16	Primeira Liga	27	2	3	1	1	0	6 (Note: Appearances in UEFA Champions League)	2	—		37	5
Porto	2016–17	Primeira Liga	25	1	1	0	2	0	5	0	—		33	1
Porto	2017–18	Primeira Liga	13	0	4	2	3	0	4	0	—		24	2
Porto	Total		65	3	8	3	6	0	15	2	—		94	8
Vitória Guimarães	2018–19	Primeira Liga	16	6	2	0	1	0	—		—		19	6
Vitória Guimarães	2019–20	Primeira Liga	16	4	0	0	1	0	0	0	—		17	4
Vitória Guimarães	2020–21	Primeira Liga	32	6	1	0	0	0	—		—		33	6
Vitória Guimarães	2021–22	Primeira Liga	14	1	1	0	4	1	—		—		19	2
Vitória Guimarães	2022–23	Primeira Liga	20	1	2	1	0	0	—		—		22	2
Vitória Guimarães	Total		98	18	6	1	6	1	0	0	—		110	20
Al-Ittihad (loan)	2021–22	Saudi Pro League	12	0	2	0	—		—		—		14	0
Career total			345	55	30	7	20	1	21	3	1	0	417	66

=== International ===
Appearances and goals by national team and year
National team	Year	Apps	Goals
Portugal	2015	4	1
Total		4	1

Scores and results list Portugal's goal tally first, score column indicates score after each André goal.

#	Date	Venue	Cap	Opponent	Score	Result	Competition
1.	17 November 2015	Stade Josy Barthel, Luxembourg, Luxembourg	4	Luxembourg	1–0	2–0	Friendly

== Honours ==
Varzim

- Segunda Divisão: 2011–12

Vitória Guimarães

- Taça de Portugal: 2012–13

Porto

- Primeira Liga: 2017–18
