= Eduardo Salvio =

Argentine footballer (born 1990)

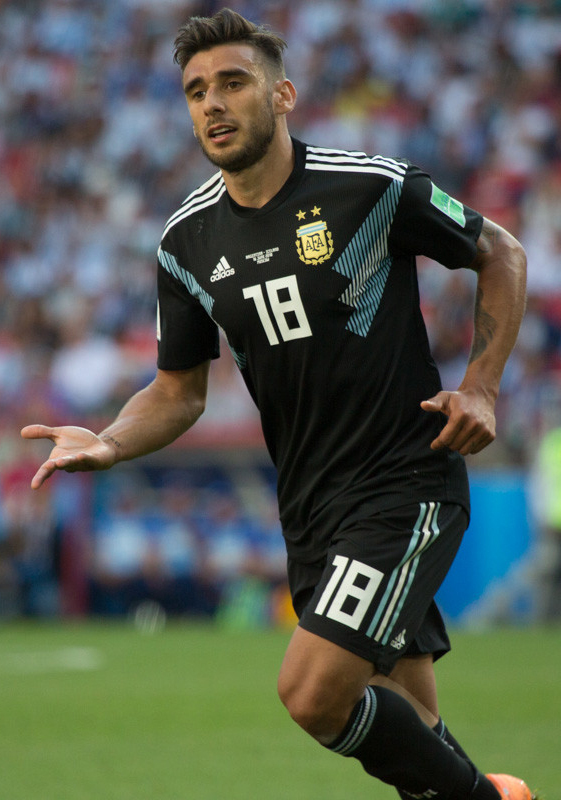
- Salvio with Argentina at the 2018 FIFA World Cup

Personal information
- Full name: Eduardo Antonio Salvio
- Date of birth: 13 July 1990 (age 36)
- Place of birth: Avellaneda, Argentina
- Height: 1.72 m (5 ft 8 in)
- Position: Winger

Team information
- Current team: Lanús
- Number: 11

Youth career
- 1994–2008: Lanús

Senior career*
Years	Team	Apps	(Gls)
2008–2010	Lanús	41	(11)
2010–2012	Atlético Madrid	44	(5)
2010–2011	→ Benfica (loan)	19	(4)
2012–2019	Benfica	147	(34)
2019–2022	Boca Juniors	44	(10)
2022–2024	UNAM	61	(14)
2024–	Lanús	84	(11)

International career^{‡}
2007	Argentina U17	4	(1)
2008–2009	Argentina U20	9	(4)
2009–2020	Argentina	14	(0)
- * Club domestic league appearances and goals as of 09:46, 13 June 2026 (UTC) ‡ National team caps and goals as of 8 October 2020

Eduardo Antonio ''Toto'' Salvio (born 13 July 1990) is an Argentine professional footballer who plays as a winger for Argentine Primera División club Lanús. Salvio is a former Argentina international player, he represented his country from 2009 to 2020, including the 2018 FIFA World Cup.

Salvio started his career with Lanús in 2008. After moving to Europe in 2010, he won two UEFA Europa League, with Spanish club Atlético Madrid, and five Primeira Liga titles, two Taça de Portugal, four Taça da Liga and three Supertaça Cândido de Oliveira, with Benfica in Portugal.

== Club career ==
=== Lanús ===
Salvio was born in Avellaneda, a port city in the province of Buenos Aires. At only 17, he was promoted to the first team of Lanús for the 2007 Apertura, but did not appear in any games in the tournament as the Granate finished in top position.

Salvio made his debut for Lanús' first team on 24 August 2008, in a game against Boca Juniors. He scored his first goal(s) for the club in a 4–2 win against Argentinos Juniors, exactly two months later. Overall, he netted nine goals in the season as the team finished fourth overall, and was also its joint-leading goal scorer, along with José Sand.

On 19 August 2009, Salvio scored twice in the first leg of Lanús' first stage Copa Sudamericana match, netting two late goals to help his team come from behind to defeat River Plate (2–1 away win, 3–1 on aggregate). In early January 2010, after months of speculation, he signed for Atlético Madrid in Spain, for a reported transfer fee of €10 million.

=== Atlético Madrid ===
Salvio made his official debut for Atlético in the 2009–10 UEFA Europa League against Galatasaray on 18 February 2010, and scored his first goals for the Colchoneros in a 3–1 La Liga home win over Tenerife on 25 April. On 12 May, he appeared as a substitute in the Europa League final against Fulham, replacing José Antonio Reyes in the 76th minute of the 2–1 triumph.

On 19 August 2010, after speculation linked him to several clubs, mostly in Spain but also in Portugal, Benfica and Atlético Madrid agreed on a season-long loan for Salvio, with the Lisbon club also buying 20% of his rights for €2.5 million. On 18 December, he opened his goal scoring for Benfica, scoring twice in a 5–2 home win against Rio Ave.

After a relatively slow start to Portuguese football, Salvio became a regular fixture for Benfica in the second part of the campaign, partnering several compatriots in the squad and usually appearing as a right winger. On 20 February 2011, he scored the first goal in a 2–0 away win against city rivals Sporting; three days later, he netted his first goal in European competition, with an impressive 20-yard strike against Stuttgart in the Europa League's round of 32 (2–0 away success, 4–1 on aggregate). To end the week, in a home league match against Marítimo, he scored the equalizer minutes after the away side opened the scoring, in an eventual 2–1 home win, finishing the campaign with 39 appearances and ten successful strikes.

Salvio officially returned to Atlético on 19 May to begin his rehabilitation on a calf injury sustained whilst still at Benfica, in a Europa League game against PSV. He continued to be regularly played by both Gregorio Manzano and his successor, compatriot Diego Simeone.

In March 2012, in two games separated by only five days, Salvio scored three goals: he started with a rare header to put the visitors ahead at Sevilla in an eventual 1–1 draw, then added a brace in a 3–1 home win against Beşiktaş in the campaign's Europa League.

=== Benfica ===
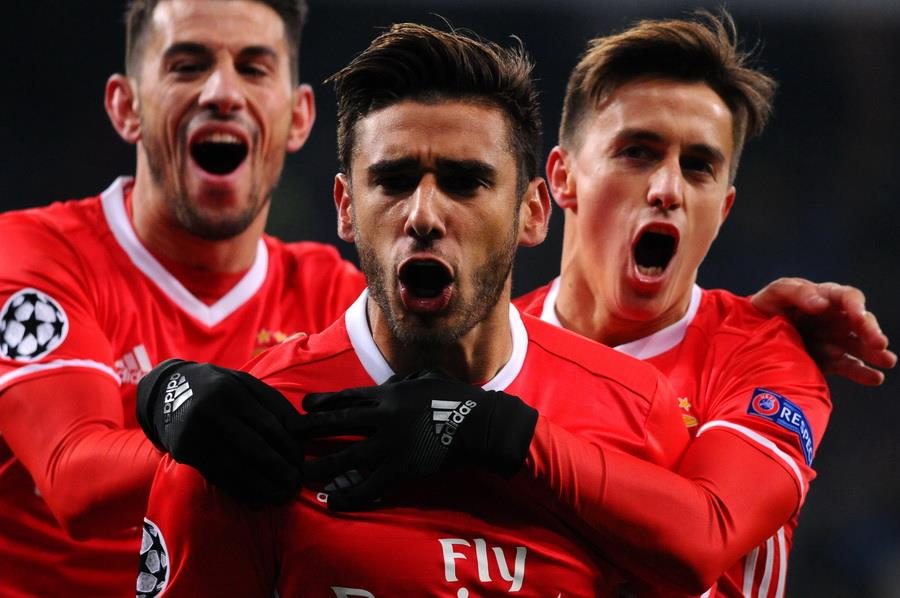
Salvio celebrating a goal in the 2016–17 UEFA Champions League

On 31 July 2012, Benfica and Atlético Madrid agreed on Salvio transferring permanently to the Portuguese side for five years, with Benfica paying a reported €11 million for eighty percent of his economic rights. With the remaining twenty already owned by them, Salvio transfer summed up a then club record €13.5 million – surpassing the previous record of €12 million paid to Barcelona to acquire the services of Simão Sabrosa in 2001. He marked his comeback in style, scoring the first of a 2–2 home draw against Braga on 18 August. He scored a career high, thirteen goals throughout the 2012–13 season.

On 31 August 2013, late into the first half of a Lisbon derby at Sporting, Salvio suffered a severe anterior cruciate ligament (ACL) injury to his right knee, going on to miss several months. It was his second serious injury in only two years (the first, in his foot, also at the service of Benfica). He marked his return from injury in less than six months, playing the last 15 minutes of a 1–0 UEFA Europa League win against PAOK

Salvio scored his first goal of the campaign on 3 April 2014, netting the game's only in an away success over AZ, for the same competition. His only other goal that came against Porto in the Portuguese Cup semi-finals as Benfica reached the final with a 3–1 victory. On 20 April 2014, he suffered another injury, this time breaking his arm in a 2–0 win against Olhanense, as Benfica clinched their 33rd league title in the same day. Although being expected to be out for the remainder of the season, he returned to the fields just ten days later, coming on as a substitute in a 0–0 draw against Juventus, with Benfica reaching their second consecutive UEFA Europa League final. Although Salvio's season was injury-plagued, he enjoyed great success as the club won the domestic treble.

Salvio started the new season with goals against Paços de Ferreira and Vitória Sétubal. He scored his only European goal of the season, against Bayer Leverkusen on 1 October 2014. Four days later, he scored his third league goal of the season, against Arouca, and made one assist in a 4–0 home win. On 22 November, he scored twice in a 4–1 win against Moreirense in the fourth round of Portuguese Cup. On 18 January 2015, Salvio scored twice at Marítimo (0–4) in Primeira Liga. He again suffered an injury on the final day of the season, as he once again tore his ACL on his right knee, which caused him to miss most of the 2015–16 season.

Salvio returned from injury on 12 February 2016, as a substitute in a 2–1 home loss to Porto. He mostly made sporadic substitute appearances in the final three months of the season, as he failed to regain his true form. However, he was still able to celebrate another league and league cup triumphs.

On 16 June 2016, Salvio renewed his contract with Benfica for two more seasons. On 28 October, after scoring the second goal in a 3–0 win against Paços de Ferreira, Salvio became the Argentine player with the most goals scored for Benfica (42), surpassing former teammate Nicolás Gaitán. On 12 December, he scored his third career goal against city rivals Sporting and, during the second half, once again suffered a serious injury, this time dislocating his right shoulder. He recovered less than a month and helped the club to their fourth straight league title. On 29 May 2017, during the 2017 Taça de Portugal Final, he scored a header against Vitória de Guimarães.

During the 2017–18 season, Salvio scored nine goals in 26 appearances, finishing as the club's second top scorer, behind Jonas.

=== Boca Juniors ===
On 18 July 2019, Benfica announced that Salvio had returned to his home country to join Boca Juniors.

=== UNAM Pumas ===
On 4 July 2022, Salvio was announced as new player of Mexican side UNAM Pumas for the Apertura 2022.

=== Lanús ===
On 2 July 2024, Salvio returned to Lanús.

== International career ==
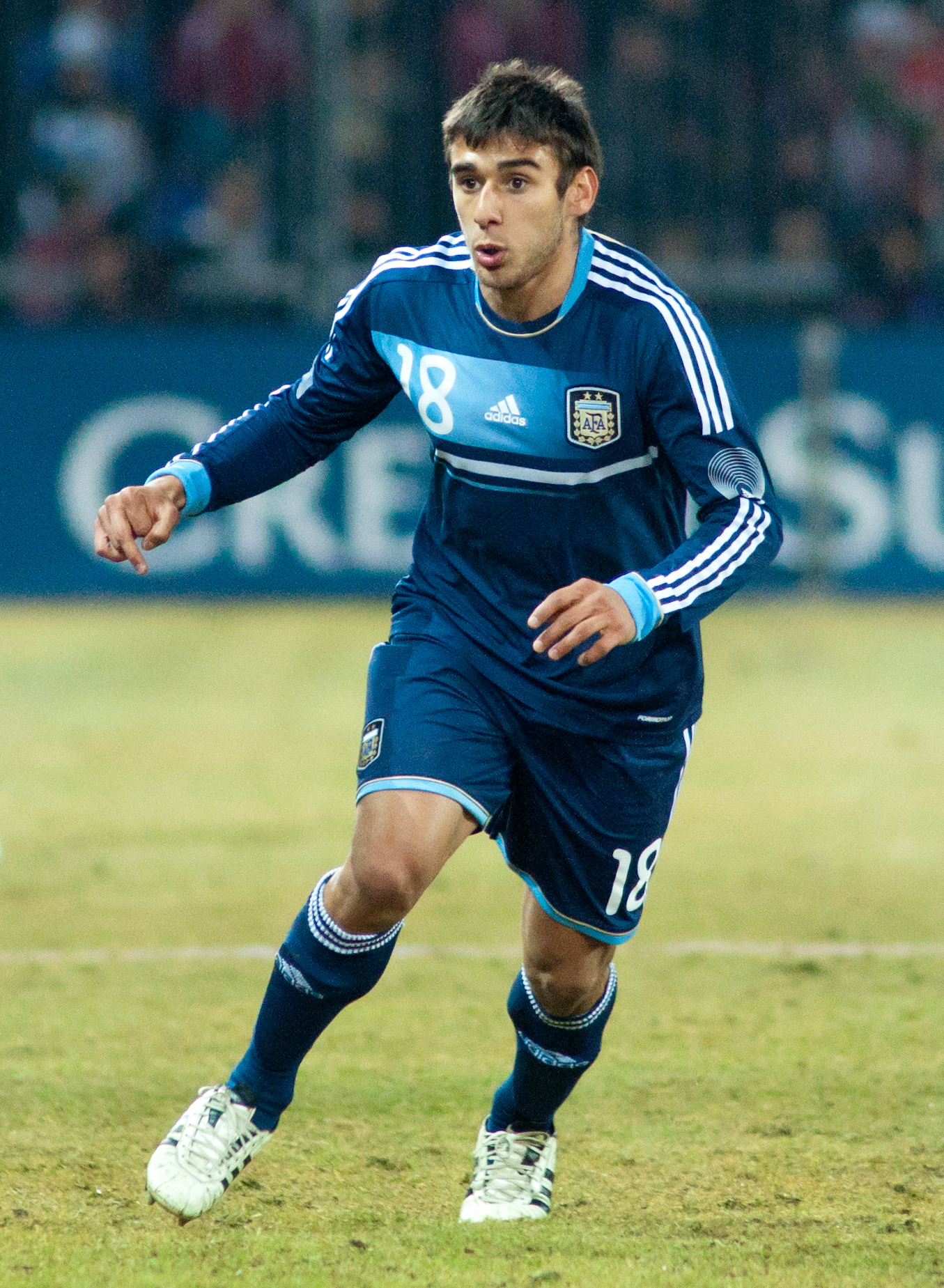
Salvio playing for Argentina in 2012

In January 2009, Salvio was selected to join the Argentina under-20 squad for the 2009 South American Youth Championship in Venezuela. The national team underperformed in the championship, failing to qualify to that year's FIFA U-20 World Cup, thus being unable to defend its 2007 title.

On 20 May 2009, aged 18, Salvio made his full international debut in a friendly match with Panama. The Argentine side, made up of players based in the Argentine Primera División, won it 3–1. He also played against Chile in a 2014 FIFA World Cup qualification match.

In May 2018, Salvio was named in Argentina's 23-man squad for the FIFA World Cup in Russia. He featured in the team's first two matches, playing as a right-back.

== Career statistics ==
=== Club ===
As of match played 27 November 2025

Club	Season	League			National cup		League cup		Continental		Total	
Club	Season	Division	Apps	Goals	Apps	Goals	Apps	Goals	Apps	Goals	Apps	Goals
Lanús	2008–09	Primera División	29	9	0	0	—		2	0	31	9
Lanús	2009–10	Primera División	12	2	0	0	—		4	2	16	4
Lanús	Total		41	11	0	0	—	—	6	2	47	13
Atlético Madrid	2009–10	La Liga	13	2	0	0	—		8	0	21	2
Atlético Madrid	2011–12	La Liga	30	3	2	0	—		16	5	48	8
Atlético Madrid	Total		43	5	2	0	—	—	24	5	69	10
Benfica	2010–11 (Note: Salvio was on loan from Atlético Madrid)	Primeira Liga	19	4	5	1	4	2	11	3	39	10
Benfica	2012–13	Primeira Liga	29	10	6	2	3	0	13	1	51	13
Benfica	2013–14	Primeira Liga	12	0	3	1	1	0	6	1	22	2
Benfica	2014–15	Primeira Liga	29	9	2 (Note: Includes appearance in the Portuguese Super Cup)	2	2	1	5	1	38	13
Benfica	2015–16	Primeira Liga	8	0	1	0	0	0	3	0	12	0
Benfica	2016–17	Primeira Liga	29	4	4	1	1	1	8	3	42	9
Benfica	2017–18	Primeira Liga	26	9	2	0	1	0	5	0	34	9
Benfica	2018–19	Primeira Liga	14	2	2	0	3	1	9	3	28	6
Benfica	Total		166	38	25	7	15	5	60	12	266	62
Boca Juniors	2019–20	Primera División	17	6	1	0	—		5	1	23	7
Boca Juniors	2020–21	Primera División	6	0	1	1	—		11	6	18	7
Boca Juniors	2021	Primera División	9	1	1	0	3	0	—		13	1
Boca Juniors	2022	Primera División	12	3	1	0	0	0	6	1	19	4
Boca Juniors	Total		44	10	4	1	3	0	22	8	73	19
UNAM	2022–23	Liga MX	27	9	—		—		4 (Note: Includes appearance in the Joan Gamper Trophy and Leagues Cup)	0	0	0
UNAM	2023–24	Liga MX	40	6	—		—		—		0	0
UNAM	Total		67	15	—		—		4	0	71	15
Lanús	2024	Primera División	18	4	—		—		4 (Note: Includes appearance in the Copa Sudamericana)	0	22	4
Lanús	2025	Primera División	33	5	3	1	—		13	2	49	8
Lanús	Total		51	9	3	1	—		17	2	74	12
Career total			412	92	34	9	18	5	137	29	597	132

=== International ===
As of match played 8 October 2020

National team	Year	Apps	Goals
Argentina	2009	1	0
Argentina	2011	2	0
Argentina	2012	2	0
Argentina	2017	3	0
Argentina	2018	5	0
Argentina	2020	1	0
Total		14	0

== Honours ==
Atlético Madrid

- UEFA Europa League: 2009–10, 2011–12

Benfica

- Primeira Liga: 2013–14, 2014–15, 2015–16, 2016–17, 2018–19
- Taça de Portugal: 2013–14, 2016–17
- Taça da Liga: 2010–11, 2013–14, 2014–15, 2015–16
- Supertaça Cândido de Oliveira: 2014, 2016, 2017

Boca Juniors

- Primera División: 2019–20, 2022
- Copa Argentina: 2019–20
- Copa de la Liga Profesional: 2020, 2022

Lanús

- Copa Sudamericana: 2025
- Recopa Sudamericana: 2026

Individual

- 2017 Taça de Portugal Final Man of the match
