= 2016–17 S.L. Benfica season =

Benfica
2016–17 season
- President: Luís Filipe Vieira
- Manager: Rui Vitória
- Stadium: Estádio da Luz
- Primeira Liga: 1st
- Taça de Portugal: Winners
- Taça da Liga: Semi-finals
- Supertaça Cândido de Oliveira: Winners
- UEFA Champions League: Round of 16
- Top goalscorer: League: Kostas Mitroglou (16); All: Kostas Mitroglou (27)
- Highest home attendance: 64,591 (stadium's record) v Vitória de Guimarães (13 May 2017)
- Lowest home attendance: 18,472 v Vizela (3 January 2017)
- Average home league attendance: 52,768
- Biggest win: Benfica 6–0 Marítimo (19 November 2016)
- Biggest defeat: Borussia Dortmund 4–0 Benfica (8 March 2017)
Home colours	Away colours

The 2016–17 season was Sport Lisboa e Benfica's 113th season in existence and the club's 83rd consecutive season in the top flight of Portuguese football. It started on 7 August 2016 with the Supertaça Cândido de Oliveira match and concluded on 28 May 2017 with the Taça de Portugal final.

Benfica played in the Primeira Liga as three-time defending champions, and were successful in defending their title, becoming a four-time champions (tetra) for the first time in their history; setting a new record of 36 league titles. In the Taça da Liga, Benfica, who also participated as the three-time defending holders, lost to eventual winners Moreirense in the semi-finals. It was Benfica's first defeat in the competition since 31 October 2007, which ended a 42-game unbeaten run. In the Taça de Portugal, Benfica beat Vitória de Guimarães to win their 26th trophy – a new record. With this victory, Benfica also achieved their 11th double (dobradinha) and second treble of league, cup and super cup, 36 years after the first one.

Internationally, Benfica played in the UEFA Champions League, where they reached the knockout phase for the first time in two consecutive years. They were eliminated from the competition in round of 16 by Borussia Dortmund on 4–1 aggregate.

== Season summary ==
=== Pre-Season ===
After a successful season in which Benfica retained the league title and won the Taça da Liga, the club entered the new season aiming for a historic fourth consecutive league championship (tetra), under manager Rui Vitória.

During the summer transfer window, Benfica sold key players, Renato Sanches, Nicolás Gaitán, and Anderson Talisca. To reinforce the squad, the club signed midfielder André Horta, wingers André Carrillo, Franco Cervi, and Andrija Živković, as well as striker Kostas Mitroglou on a permanent deal.

The pre-season began on 14 July with a 0–0 draw against Vitória de Setúbal. They followed this with a 4–0 win over Derby County, a 1–0 loss to Sheffield Wednesday, a 2–0 victory against Wolfsburg, a 1–1 draw with Torino FC in the Eusébio Cup, and a 3–2 defeat to Lyon.

=== August–November ===
Benfica's first official match of the season took place on 7 August in the 2016 Supertaça Cândido de Oliveira at Estádio Municipal de Aveiro, where Benfica defeated Braga 3–0 with goals from Cervi, Jonas, and Pizzi. In the league, Benfica began with a 2–0 away win over Tondela, a 1–1 home draw against Vitória de Setúbal, and a 3–1 away win over Nacional. In September, the team won all its league matches: away to Arouca, at home against Braga, and away to Chaves, finishing the month one point ahead of Sporting and three ahead of Porto. In the UEFA Champions League, Benfica opened with a 1–1 home draw against Beşiktaş, with Talisca scoring the equaliser in stoppage time. The following match saw Benfica lose 4–2 away to Napoli.

In October, Benfica won all of its matches: 4–0 at home against Feirense, 2–1 away against 1º Dezembro in the third round of the 2016–17 Taça de Portugal, 2–0 away against Dynamo Kyiv in the Champions League, 2–0 away against Belenenses, and 3–0 at home against Paços de Ferreira, extending its league lead to five points. In November, the team recorded a 1–0 home win against Dynamo Kyiv, followed by a 1–1 away draw with Porto, in which Benfica equalised in stoppage time. The month continued with a 6–0 home win over Marítimo in the Taça de Portugal and a 3–0 home victory against Moreirense.

=== December–January ===
December began with a 2–1 away defeat to Marítimo, followed by a 2–1 home loss to Napoli in the Champions League. The team then earned a 2–1 home win against Sporting, a 3–0 away win over Real SC in the Taça de Portugal, a 1–0 away win against Estoril, a 2–0 home win over Rio Ave, and a 1–0 home victory against Paços de Ferreira in the Taça da Liga, finishing the year with a four-point lead at the top of the league.

The new year opened with a 4–0 win over Vizela in the Taça da Liga, followed by consecutive 2–0 away wins against Vitória de Guimarães in the league and Taça da Liga. A 3–3 home draw with Boavista was followed by a 6–2 home win against Leixões in the Taça de Portugal quarter-finals and a 4–0 league win over Tondela. However, Benfica then suffered two defeats: a 3–1 loss to Moreirense in the Taça da Liga semi-finals and a 1–0 away defeat to Vitória de Setúbal, ending January eliminated from the Taça da Liga, in the semi-finals of the Taça de Portugal, and holding a one-point lead over Porto.

=== February–April ===
After a difficult January, Benfica won all of its matches in February: home victories over Nacional and Arouca, a 1–0 win against Borussia Dortmund in the Champions League round of 16, a 1–0 away win over Braga secured by a goal from Kostas Mitroglou, a 3–1 home victory against Chaves, and a 2–1 away win over Estoril in the Taça de Portugal semi-finals. This was followed by a 1–0 away defeat to Feirense and a 4–0 away loss to Borussia Dortmund, which eliminated Benfica from the Champions League. The team then responded with a 4–0 home win over Belenenses and a 0–0 away draw with Paços de Ferreira.

On 1 April, Benfica hosted Porto in a decisive league match. The game ended 1–1, allowing Benfica to retain its lead, followed by a 3–3 home draw with Estoril in the Taça de Portugal semi-finals, which qualified Benfica for its first final in three years. Subsequent results included a 1–0 away win over Moreirense, a 3–0 home victory against Marítimo, and a 1–1 away draw with Sporting, in which center-back Lindelöf scored from a free kick. A 2–1 home win over Estoril closed the month with Benfica holding a three-point league lead and a place in the Taça de Portugal final.

=== May ===
In May, a 1–0 away win against Rio Ave brought Benfica closer to the league title. On 13 May, a 5–0 victory over Vitória de Guimarães secured the club's first ever fourth consecutive league championship (tetra) in its 113-year history. The season concluded with a 2–2 draw against Boavista at the Estádio do Bessa, followed by a 2–1 win over Vitória de Guimarães in the Taça de Portugal final, completing a domestic double (dobradinha).

== Players ==
=== Squad information ===
N	Pos.	Nat.	Name	Age	Since	App	Goals	Ends	Transfer fee	Notes
1	GK	(Brazil)	Ederson M.	33	2015	58	0	2023	Undisclosed	Originally from youth system
2	CB	(Argentina)	Lisandro	37	2014	46	5	2021	Undisclosed	
3	LB	(Spain)	Grimaldo	31	2016 (Winter)	26	2	2021	€2.12M	
4	CB	(Brazil)	Luisão (captain)	45	2003	514	45	2018	Undisclosed	
5	DM	(Serbia)	Fejsa	38	2013	96	2	2019	Undisclosed	
6	MF	(Brazil)	F. Augusto	33	2017 (Winter)	13	0	2022	Undisclosed	
7	CM	(Greece)	Samaris	37	2014	110	2	2019	€10M	
8	MF	(Portugal)	André Horta	29	2016	16	1	2021	Free	Originally from youth system
9	ST	(Mexico)	Raúl	35	2015	77	23	2020	€21.8M	Club record signing
10	ST	(Brazil)	Jonas	42	2014	111	85	2019	Free	
11	ST	(Greece)	Mitroglou	38	2015	89	52	2020	€7.47M	
12	GK	(Brazil)	Júlio César	47	2014	79	0	2018	Free	
13	GK	(Portugal)	Paulo Lopes	48	2012	11	0	2018	Free	Originally from youth system
14	CB	(Sweden)	V. Lindelöf	32	2014	72	2	2021	Youth system	Promoted from Benfica B
15	RW	(Peru)	Carrillo D.	35	2016	32	3	2021	€6.61M	
17	MF	(Serbia)	Živković	30	2016	24	1	2021	€6M	
18	RW	(Argentina)	Salvio	36	2012	204	47	2019	€13.5M	Played on loan in the 2010–11 season
19	LB	(Portugal)	Eliseu	43	2014	97	4	2017	Undisclosed	
21	CM	(Portugal)	Pizzi	37	2014	130	25	2022	€14M	
22	MF	(Argentina)	F. Cervi	32	2016	41	7	2022	€5.74M	
23	RB	(Portugal)	P. Pereira	28	2017 (Winter)	1	0	2022	Undisclosed	Originally from youth system
27	MF	(Portugal)	Silva	33	2016	31	2	2021	€16.4M	
33	CB	(Brazil)	Jardel (VC)	40	2011 (Winter)	177	11	2020	Undisclosed	
34	RB	(Portugal)	A. Almeida	36	2012	156	2	2018	Undisclosed	
38	LB	(Brazil)	M. Hermes	31	2017 (Winter)	1	0	2021	Free	
50	RB	(Portugal)	N. Semedo	32	2015	65	3	2021	Undisclosed	Promoted from Benfica B

- Last updated: 28 May 2017
- Ordered by squad number.

=== New contracts ===
No.	Pos	Player	Contract length	Contract end	Date	Source
21	CM	(Portugal) Pizzi	3 years	2022	21 January 2017	Benfica
1	GK	(Brazil) Ederson	3 years	2023	21 January 2017	Benfica
10	ST	(Brazil) Jonas	1 year	2019	1 March 2017	Benfica
2	CB	(Argentina) Lisandro López	3 years	2021	5 March 2017	Relatório e Contas
14	CB	(Sweden) Victor Lindelöf	1 year	2021	5 March 2017	Relatório e Contas
4	CB	(Brazil) Luisão	1 year	2018	8 April 2017	Benfica

=== Transfers ===
==== In ====
No.	Pos.	Nat.	Name	Age	Moving from	Type	Transfer window	Ends	Transfer fee	Source
22	MF	(Argentina)	Franco Cervi	21	(Argentina) Rosario Central	Transfer	Summer	2022	€5.74M	Benfica NaM
11	FW	(Greece)	Kostas Mitroglou	28	(England) Fulham	Transfer	Summer	2020	€7.47M	Benfica NaM
8	MF	(Portugal)	André Horta	19	(Portugal) Vitória de Setúbal	Transfer	Summer	2021	Undisclosed	Benfica
16	DF	(Croatia)	Branimir Kalaica	18	Unattached	Transfer	Summer	2021	Free	Benfica
15	MF	(Peru)	André Carrillo	25	Unattached	Transfer	Summer	2021	€6.61M	Benfica NaM
28	MF	(Colombia)	Guillermo Celis	23	(Colombia) Junior	Transfer	Summer	2021	€2.28M	Benfica NaM
17	MF	(Serbia)	Andrija Živković	19	Unattached	Transfer	Summer	2021	€6.3M	Benfica A Bola
—	MF	(Argentina)	Óscar Benítez	23	(Argentina) Lanús	Transfer	Summer	2021	€4.4M	Benfica DNA Bola
37	MF	(Brazil)	Danilo	20	(Portugal) Braga	Loan	Summer	2017	Free	Benfica
27	MF	(Portugal)	Rafa Silva	23	(Portugal) Braga	Transfer	Summer	2021	€16.4M	Benfica
—	MF	(Portugal)	Pedro Nuno	21	(Portugal) Académica	Transfer	Winter	2020	Undisclosed	O Jogo
38	DF	(Brazil)	Marcelo Hermes	21	Unattached	Transfer	Winter	2021	€2.9M	Benfica O Jogo
23	DF	(Portugal)	Pedro Pereira	19	(Italy) Sampdoria	Transfer	Winter	2022	€2.6M	Benfica Sampdoria
6	MF	(Brazil)	Filipe Augusto	23	(Portugal) Rio Ave	Transfer	Winter	2022	Undisclosed	Benfica

==== Out ====
No.	Pos.	Nat.	Name	Age	Moving to	Type	Transfer window	Transfer fee	Source
85	MF	(Portugal)	Renato Sanches	18	(Germany) Bayern Munich	Transfer	Summer	€35M+€45M variables	Bayern Munich Benfica
—	FW	(Uruguay)	Jonathan Rodríguez	22	(Mexico) Santos Laguna	Transfer	Summer	Undisclosed	Santos Laguna
24	MF	(Italy)	Bryan Cristante	21	(Italy) Pescara	Loan (Note: On 27 January 2017, Cristante's season-long loan at Pescara was terminated.)	Summer	Undisclosed	Pescara
28	DF	(Portugal)	Sílvio	28	(Spain) Atlético Madrid	Loan return	Summer	—	Atlético Madrid
—	FW	(Portugal)	Daniel Candeias	28	(Turkey) Alanyaspor	Loan	Summer	Undisclosed	Alanyaspor
—	FW	(Portugal)	Nuno Santos	21	(Portugal) Vitória de Setúbal	Loan	Summer	Undisclosed	Vitória de Setúbal
—	DF	(Brazil)	Luís Felipe	25	(Brazil) Oeste	Loan	Summer	Undisclosed	FPF
—	FW	(Brazil)	Derley	28	(Mexico) Chiapas	Loan	Summer	Undisclosed	Maisfutebol
32	FW	(Portugal)	Bebé	26	(Spain) Eibar	Transfer	Summer	€0.75M	Eibar Record
—	DF	(Brazil)	César	23	(Portugal) Nacional	Loan	Summer	Undisclosed	Nacional
10	MF	(Argentina)	Nicolás Gaitán	28	(Spain) Atlético Madrid	Transfer	Summer	€25M	Atlético Madrid
—	MF	(Brazil)	Diego Lopes	22	(Brazil) América	Loan (Note: On 18 October 2016, Diego Lopes' season-long loan at América was terminated.)	Summer	Undisclosed	globoesporte
—	MF	(Germany)	Hany Mukhtar	21	(Denmark) Brøndby	Loan	Summer	Undisclosed	Brøndby
31	FW	(Brazil)	Victor Andrade	20	(Germany) TSV 1860 Munich	Loan	Summer	Undisclosed	TSV 1860 Munich
—	MF	(Serbia)	Filip Đuričić	24	(Italy) Sampdoria	Loan (Note: On 30 January 2017, Đuričić signed with Sampdoria.)	Summer	Undisclosed	Sampdoria
—	FW	(Austria)	Kevin Friesenbichler	22	Austria Wien	Loan	Summer	Undisclosed	Austria Wien
—	MF	(Venezuela)	Jhon Murillo	20	(Portugal) Tondela	Loan	Summer	Undisclosed	Tondela
—	MF	(Portugal)	Hélder Costa	22	(England) Wolverhampton Wanderers	Loan (Note: On 30 January 2017, Costa signed a four-and-a-half-year deal with Wolverhampton.)	Summer	Undisclosed	Wolverhampton
40	MF	(Portugal)	João Teixeira	22	(England) Wolverhampton Wanderers	Loan (Note: On 27 January 2017, João Teixeira's season-long loan at Wolverhampton was terminated.)	Summer	Undisclosed	Wolverhampton
—	MF	(Argentina)	Luis Fariña	25	(Greece) Asteras Tripolis	Loan	Summer	Undisclosed	Asteras Tripolis
—	DF	(Canada)	Steven Vitória	29	(Poland) Lechia Gdańsk	Transfer	Summer	Undisclosed	Benfica Lechia Gdańsk
27	DF	(Brazil)	Marçal	27	(France) Guingamp	Loan	Summer	Undisclosed	Guingamp
—	MF	(Netherlands)	Ola John	24	(England) Wolverhampton Wanderers	Loan (Note: On 11 January 2017, Ola John's season-long loan at Wolverhampton was terminated.)	Summer	Undisclosed	Wolverhampton
30	MF	(Brazil)	Talisca	22	(Turkey) Beşiktaş	Loan	Summer	€2M	Beşiktaş zerozero
—	FW	(Portugal)	Nélson Oliveira	25	(England) Norwich City	Transfer	Summer	Undisclosed	Norwich City
39	MF	(Morocco)	Mehdi Carcela	27	(Spain) Granada	Transfer	Summer	Undisclosed	Granada
25	FW	(Portugal)	Rui Fonte	26	(Portugal) Braga	Transfer	Summer	Undisclosed	Braga
—	MF	(Argentina)	Óscar Benítez	23	(Portugal) Braga	Loan (Note: On 30 January 2017, Óscar Benítez's season-long loan at Braga was terminated.)	Summer	Undisclosed	Braga
—	MF	(Portugal)	Pedro Nuno	21	(Portugal) Tondela	Loan	Winter	Undisclosed	Tondela
—	MF	(Brazil)	Diego Lopes	22	(Greece) Panetolikos	Loan	Winter	Undisclosed	Panetolikos
—	MF	(Netherlands)	Ola John	24	(Spain) Deportivo La Coruña	Loan	Winter	Undisclosed	Deportivo La Coruña
37	MF	(Brazil)	Danilo	19	(Portugal) Braga	Loan return	Winter	—	Standard Liége
20	MF	(Portugal)	Gonçalo Guedes	20	(France) Paris Saint-Germain	Transfer	Winter	€30M+€7M additional bonus	Benfica
24	MF	(Italy)	Bryan Cristante	21	(Italy) Atalanta	Loan	Winter	Undisclosed	Benfica
40	MF	(Portugal)	João Teixeira	22	(England) Nottingham Forest	Loan	Winter	Undisclosed	Benfica
—	MF	(Portugal)	Hélder Costa	23	(England) Wolverhampton Wanderers	Transfer	Winter	€15M	Benfica Wolverhampton
—	MF	(Serbia)	Filip Đuričić	25	(Italy) Sampdoria	Transfer	Winter	Undisclosed	Sampdoria
23	MF	(Argentina)	Óscar Benítez	23	(Argentina) Boca Juniors	Loan	Winter	Undisclosed	Benfica
28	MF	(Colombia)	Guillermo Celis	23	(Portugal) Vitória de Guimarães	Loan	Winter	Undisclosed	zerozero
—	MF	(Germany)	Hany Mukhtar	22	(Denmark) Brøndby	Transfer	Summer	Undisclosed	Brøndby

== Technical staff ==
Position	Name
Head coach	Rui Vitória
Assistant coach	Arnaldo Teixeira; Minervino Pietra; Sérgio Botelho; Marco Pedroso
Fitness coach	Paulo Morão
Goalkeeping coach	Luís Esteves
Benfica LAB coordinator	Bruno Mendes
Physiotherapist	Paulo Rebelo; Carlos Costa; Telmo Firmino
Scout	José Boto
Technical coordinator	Shéu
Doctor	Bento Leitão; António Martins
Nurse	Duarte Pinto
Nutritionist	Diogo Ferreira
Goalkeeper training coordinator	Hugo Oliveira^{1}

Last updated: 5 January 2017

Terminated his contract with Benfica. Signed with Hull City on 5 January.

== Pre-season friendlies ==
Win Draw Loss

14 July 2016 Algarve Football Cup	Benfica	0–0 (3–3 p)	Vitória de Setúbal	Faro/Loulé, Portugal
20:30 WEST (UTC+01:00)			Issoko (yellow card) 71'; Varela (yellow card) 73'	Stadium: Estádio Algarve; Referee: Cristiano Pires (Portugal)
	Penalties
	López (penalty missed); Salvio (penalty scored); Almeida (penalty scored); Cervi (penalty scored); Kalaica (penalty missed)		(penalty missed) Nader; (penalty scored) Meyong; (penalty missed) Costa; (penalty scored) Ruca; (penalty scored) Issoko

16 July 2016 Algarve Football Cup	Benfica	4–0	Derby County	Faro/Loulé, Portugal
20:30 WEST (UTC+01:00)	Semedo 16'; Fonte 54'; Almeida 63'; Salvio 90'		Buxton (yellow card) 19'	Stadium: Estádio Algarve; Referee: Pedro Oliveira (Portugal)

20 July 2016 Friendly	Sheffield Wednesday	1–0	Benfica	Sheffield, England
19:30 BST (UTC+01:00)	Forestieri 22'; Semedo (yellow card) 78'		Luisão (yellow card) 27'	Stadium: Hillsborough Stadium; Attendance: 12,207; Referee: Andrew Madley (England)

24 July 2016 Friendly	Wolfsburg	0–2	Benfica	Altach, Austria
18:15 CEST (UTC+02:00)			Mitroglou 63'; Jonas 90+1'	Stadium: Cashpoint Arena; Attendance: 2,524; Referee: Robert Schörgenhofer (Austria)

27 July 2016 Eusébio Cup	Benfica	1–1 (5–6 p)	Torino	Lisbon, Portugal
19:45 WEST (UTC+01:00)	Vives 11' (o.g.)		Ljajić 32'	Stadium: Estádio da Luz; Attendance: 45,818; Referee: Fábio Veríssimo (Portugal)
	Penalties
	Jiménez (penalty scored); Jonas (penalty scored); Grimaldo (penalty scored); Samaris (penalty scored); Pizzi (penalty scored); Lindelöf (penalty missed)		(penalty scored) Baselli; (penalty scored) Aramu; (penalty scored) Boyé; (penalty scored) Martínez; (penalty scored) López; (penalty scored) Silva

31 July 2016 Friendly	Lyon	3–2	Benfica	Lyon, France
20:45 CEST (UTC+02:00)	Fekir 18'; Cornet 26'; Lacazette 29' (pen.) (yellow card) 37'; Gonalons (yellow card) 50'; Gorgelin (yellow card) 52'		Grimaldo 22'; Almeida 52'	Stadium: Parc Olympique Lyonnais; Attendance: 20,000; Referee: Tony Chapron (France)

8 October 2016 Friendly	Santos	1–1	Benfica	Santos, Brazil
16:15 BRT (UTC−03:00)	Luiz Filipe (yellow card) 30'; Noguera 88'		Cervi (yellow card) 27'; Salvio 47' (pen.)	Stadium: Vila Belmiro; Attendance: 10,149; Referee: Raphael Claus (Brazil)

== Competitions ==
=== Overall record ===
Performance by competition
Competition	Starting round	Final position/round	First match	Last match
Primeira Liga	—N/a	1st	13 August 2016	20 May 2017
Taça de Portugal	Third round	Winners	14 October 2016	28 May 2017
Taça da Liga	Third round	Semi-finals	29 December 2016	26 January 2017
Supertaça Cândido de Oliveira	—N/a	Winners	7 August 2016	
UEFA Champions League	Group stage	Round of 16	13 September 2016	8 March 2017

Statistics by competition
Competition	Pld	W	D	L	GF	GA	GD	Win%
Primeira Liga	34	25	7	2	72	18	+54	73.53
Taça de Portugal	7	6	1	0	24	8	+16	85.71
Taça da Liga	4	3	0	1	8	3	+5	75.00
Supertaça Cândido de Oliveira	1	1	0	0	3	0	+3	100.00
UEFA Champions League	8	3	2	3	11	14	−3	37.50
Total	54	38	10	6	118	43	+75	70.37

=== Supertaça Cândido de Oliveira ===
7 August 2016	Benfica	3–0	Braga	Aveiro
20:45 WEST (UTC+01:00)	Cervi 10'; Semedo (yellow card) 31'; Grimaldo (yellow card) 53'; Jonas 75'; Pizzi 90+2'		Marcelo Goiano (yellow card) 6'; Boly (yellow card) 72'	Stadium: Estádio Municipal de Aveiro; Attendance: 28,796; Referee: João Capela (Lisbon); Man of the Match: Franco Cervi

=== Primeira Liga ===
==== League table ====
Pos	Team	Pld	W	D	L	GF	GA	GD	Pts	Qualification or relegation
1	Benfica (C)	34	25	7	2	72	18	+54	82	Qualification for the Champions League group stage
2	Porto	34	22	10	2	71	19	+52	76	Qualification for the Champions League group stage
3	Sporting CP	34	21	7	6	68	36	+32	70	Qualification for the Champions League play-off round
4	Vitória de Guimarães	34	18	8	8	50	39	+11	62	Qualification for the Europa League group stage (Note: Since Benfica won the 2016–17 Taça de Portugal, the spot awarded to the cup winner (Europa League group stage) was passed to the fourth-placed team and the spot originally meant for the fourth-placed team (Europa League third qualifying round) was given to the sixth-placed team.)
5	Braga	34	15	9	10	51	36	+15	54	Qualification for the Europa League third qualifying round

Source: Liga Portugal
Rules for classification: 1) Points; 2) Head-to-head points; 3) Head-to-head goal difference; 4) Head-to-head away goals scored; 5) Goal difference; 6) Matches won; 7) Goals scored; 8) Play-off.
(Note: The LPFP decided that only criteria 1, 5, 6 and 7 would be applied to establish the classification during the competition.)
(C) Champions

==== Results by round ====
Round	1	2	3	4	5	6	7	8	9	10	11	12	13	14	15	16	17	18	19	20	21	22	23	24	25	26	27	28	29	30	31	32	33	34
Ground	A	H	A	A	H	A	H	A	H	A	H	A	H	A	H	A	H	H	A	H	H	A	H	A	H	A	H	A	H	A	H	A	H	A
Result	W	D	W	W	W	W	W	W	W	D	W	L	W	W	W	W	D	W	L	W	W	W	W	W	W	D	D	W	W	D	W	W	W	D
Position	2	4	2	3	1	1	1	1	1	1	1	1	1	1	1	1	1	1	1	1	1	1	1	1	1	1	1	1	1	1	1	1	1	1

A = Away; H = Home; W = Win; D = Draw; L = Loss

==== Matches ====
13 August 2016 1	Tondela	0–2	Benfica	Tondela
20:30 WEST (UTC+01:00)	Cardoso (yellow card) 43'; Wágner (yellow card) 45+1'	Report	López 39'; Fejsa (yellow card) 68'; Horta 90+2' (yellow card) 90+3'	Stadium: Estádio João Cardoso; Attendance: 4,973; Referee: João Pinheiro (Braga)

21 August 2016 2	Benfica	1–1	Vitória de Setúbal	Lisbon
20:15 WEST (UTC+01:00)	López (yellow card) 72'; Jiménez 82' (pen.); (Samaris (yellow card) 86')	Report	Costinha (yellow card) 32'; Venâncio 66'; Fernandes (yellow card) 86'; Pacheco (yellow card) 89'	Stadium: Estádio da Luz; Attendance: 56,351; Referee: Manuel Oliveira (Porto)

27 August 2016 3	Nacional	1–3	Benfica	Funchal
20:30 WEST (UTC+01:00)	Figueiredo 64'; Gonçalves (yellow card) 85'	Report	Ghazal 17' (o.g.); Horta (yellow card) 31'; Pizzi (yellow card) 62'; Carrillo 70'; Semedo (yellow card) 73'; Salvio (yellow card) 90'; Jiménez 90+2'	Stadium: Estádio da Madeira; Attendance: 5,017; Referee: Artur Soares Dias (Porto)

9 September 2016 4	Arouca	1–2	Benfica	Arouca
20:30 WEST (UTC+01:00)	Santos (yellow card) 37'; Crivellaro (yellow card) 37'; González 56'; Gegé (yellow card) 64' ( (red card) ); Zequinha (yellow card) 73'; Coelho (yellow card) 86'; Artur (yellow card) 90+1'	Report	Semedo 16' (yellow card) 76'; López 51' (yellow card) 80'; Jardel (yellow card) 57'; Pizzi (yellow card) 63'	Stadium: Estádio Municipal de Arouca; Attendance: 5,351; Referee: Fábio Veríssimo (Leiria)

19 September 2016 5	Benfica	3–1	Braga	Lisbon
20:00 WEST (UTC+01:00)	Mitroglou 27', 78'; Pizzi 74'	Report	Baiano (yellow card) 45+2'; Hassan (yellow card) 75'; Marafona (yellow card) 75'; Rosić 90'; Eduardo (yellow card) 90+3'	Stadium: Estádio da Luz; Attendance: 52,181; Referee: Jorge Sousa (Porto)

24 September 2016 6	Chaves	0–2	Benfica	Chaves
18:15 WEST (UTC+01:00)	Braga (yellow card) 50'; Freire (yellow card) 83'; Lenho (yellow card) 85'	Report	López (yellow card) 26'; Mitroglou 69'; Pizzi 84'	Stadium: Estádio Municipal Eng. Manuel Branco Teixeira; Attendance: 8,000; Referee: Tiago Martins (Lisbon)

2 October 2016 7	Benfica	4–0	Feirense	Lisbon
16:00 WEST (UTC+01:00)	Aurélio 35' (o.g.); Salvio 61'; Cervi 70'; Grimaldo 90+3'	Report	Dias (yellow card) 58'; Semedo (yellow card) 90'; Alcénat (yellow card) 90+2'	Stadium: Estádio da Luz; Attendance: 58,637; Referee: Luís Ferreira (Braga)

23 October 2016 8	Belenenses	0–2	Benfica	Lisbon
20:15 WEST (UTC+01:00)	Sousa (yellow card) 37'; Gerso (yellow card) 87'; Palhinha (yellow card) 90+2'	Report	Mitroglou 10'; Ederson (yellow card) 37'; Grimaldo 65'; Pizzi (yellow card) 90+4'	Stadium: Estádio do Restelo; Attendance: 12,236; Referee: Hugo Miguel (Lisbon)

28 October 2016 9	Benfica	3–0	Paços de Ferreira	Lisbon
19:00 WEST (UTC+01:00)	Guedes 26'; Salvio 64'; Pizzi 87'	Report		Stadium: Estádio da Luz; Attendance: 52,731; Referee: Bruno Esteves (Setúbal)

6 November 2016 10	Porto	1–1	Benfica	Porto
18:00 WET (UTC±00:00)	Corona (yellow card) 12'; Jota 50'	Report	Ederson (yellow card) 49'; Pizzi (yellow card) 63'; Samaris (yellow card) 65'; López 90+2'	Stadium: Estádio do Dragão; Attendance: 50,019; Referee: Artur Soares Dias (Porto)

27 November 2016 11	Benfica	3–0	Moreirense	Lisbon
18:00 WET (UTC±00:00)	Pizzi 32', 58'; Fejsa (yellow card) 67'; Jiménez 88'	Report	Cauê (yellow card) 33'; Nildo Petrolina (yellow card) 37'; Sagna (yellow card) 43'; Jander (yellow card) 83'	Stadium: Estádio da Luz; Attendance: 55,970; Referee: Luís Godinho (Évora)

2 December 2016 12	Marítimo	2–1	Benfica	Funchal
20:30 WET (UTC±00:00)	Ghazaryan 4'; Bessa (yellow card) 34'; Silva (yellow card) 53'; Costa (yellow card) 58'; Antônio 68'; Soares (yellow card) 90'; Gottardi (yellow card) 90+1'; Fransérgio (yellow card) 90+5'	Report	Guedes 27'; Carrillo (yellow card) 86'	Stadium: Estádio do Marítimo; Attendance: 10,320; Referee: Vasco Santos (Porto)

11 December 2016 13	Benfica	2–1	Sporting CP	Lisbon
18:00 WET (UTC±00:00)	Salvio 25'; Guedes (yellow card) 37'; Jiménez 48' (yellow card) 73'; Danilo (yellow card) 85'	Report	Bruno César (yellow card) 25'; Dost 69'; Zeegelaar (yellow card) 81'; Coates (yellow card) 82'	Stadium: Estádio da Luz; Attendance: 63,312; Referee: Jorge Sousa (Porto)

17 December 2016 14	Estoril	0–1	Benfica	Estoril
20:30 WET (UTC±00:00)	Taira (yellow card) 30'; Afonso (yellow card) 49'; Ailton (yellow card) 59'	Report	Jiménez 60' (pen.)	Stadium: Estádio António Coimbra da Mota; Attendance: 7,429; Referee: Bruno Paixão (Setúbal)

21 December 2016 15	Benfica	2–0	Rio Ave	Lisbon
18:00 WET (UTC±00:00)	Mitroglou 14'; Pizzi 41' (yellow card) 68' (yellow-red card) 90+3'	Report		Stadium: Estádio da Luz; Attendance: 51,566; Referee: Rui Costa (Porto)

7 January 2017 16	Vitória de Guimarães	0–2	Benfica	Guimarães
18:15 WET (UTC±00:00)	Gaspar (yellow card) 90'	Report	Jonas 19'; Semedo (yellow card) 31'; Mitroglou 42'; Lindelöf (yellow card) 43'	Stadium: Estádio D. Afonso Henriques; Attendance: 26,985; Referee: Nuno Almeida (Algarve)

14 January 2017 17	Benfica	3–3	Boavista	Lisbon
16:00 WET (UTC±00:00)	Luisão (yellow card) 38'; Mitroglou 41'; Jonas 53' (pen.); Espinho 68' (o.g.); Semedo (yellow card) 87'; (Jardel (yellow card) )	Report	Medeiros 14' (yellow card) 77'; Lucas 20' (yellow card) 68'; Schembri 25'; Espinho (yellow card) 69'; Aghayev (yellow card) 75' ( (yellow card) (red card) ); Sampaio (yellow card) 89'	Stadium: Estádio da Luz; Attendance: 57,480; Referee: Luís Ferreira (Braga)

22 January 2017 18	Benfica	4–0	Tondela	Lisbon
16:00 WET (UTC±00:00)	Pizzi 58', 76'; Silva 84'; Jonas 90+2' (pen.)	Report	Pica (yellow card) 62' (yellow-red card) 90+2'	Stadium: Estádio da Luz; Attendance: 56,053; Referee: Bruno Esteves (Setúbal)

30 January 2017 19	Vitória de Setúbal	1–0	Benfica	Setúbal
20:00 WET (UTC±00:00)	Zé Manuel 21'; Pinto (yellow card) 57'; Fernandes (yellow card) 83'	Report	Cervi (yellow card) 11'	Stadium: Estádio do Bonfim; Attendance: 10,109; Referee: João Pinheiro (Braga)

5 February 2017 20	Benfica	3–0	Nacional	Lisbon
18:00 WET (UTC±00:00)	Jonas 26', 35' (yellow card) 33'; Ederson (yellow card) 59'; Mitroglou 81'	Report	Washington (yellow card) 34'; Mezga (yellow card) 43'; Rodrigues (yellow card) 52'; Zequinha (yellow card) 56'; Correia (yellow card) 60'	Stadium: Estádio da Luz; Attendance: 48,638; Referee: Luís Godinho (Évora)

10 February 2017 21	Benfica	3–0	Arouca	Lisbon
20:30 WET (UTC±00:00)	Mitroglou 25', 35'; Ederson (red card) 41'; Carrillo 49'	Report	Adilson Goiano (yellow card) 40'; Tomané (yellow card) 52'	Stadium: Estádio da Luz; Attendance: 46,256; Referee: Manuel Mota (Braga)

19 February 2017 22	Braga	0–1	Benfica	Braga
20:15 WET (UTC±00:00)	Santos (yellow card) 42'; Artur Jorge (yellow card) 52'; Cartabia (yellow card) 86'	Report	Eliseu (yellow card) 69'; Jiménez (yellow card) 77'; Mitroglou 79'; Carrillo (yellow card) 90+2'	Stadium: Estádio Municipal de Braga; Attendance: 24,836; Referee: Tiago Martins (Lisbon)

24 February 2017 23	Benfica	3–1	Chaves	Lisbon
20:30 WET (UTC±00:00)	Mitroglou 17', 89'; Silva 50'; Semedo (yellow card) 68'	Report	Bressan 44'; Davidson (yellow card) 70'; Tiba (yellow card) 75'	Stadium: Estádio da Luz; Attendance: 53,810; Referee: Nuno Almeida (Algarve)

4 March 2017 24	Feirense	0–1	Benfica	Santa Maria da Feira
20:30 WET (UTC±00:00)	Machado (yellow card) 11'; Cris (yellow card) 28'; Etebo (yellow card) 32'; Babanco (yellow card) 48'	Report	Carrillo (yellow card) 38'; Pizzi 41'; Samaris (yellow card) 86'	Stadium: Estádio Marcolino de Castro; Attendance: 5,449; Referee: Artur Soares Dias (Porto)

13 March 2017 25	Benfica	4–0	Belenenses	Lisbon
20:00 WET (UTC±00:00)	Almeida 12'; Mitroglou 51'; Salvio 60'; Carrillo (yellow card) 70'; Luisão (yellow card) 84'; Jonas 90'	Report	Camará (yellow card) 60'; João Diogo (yellow card) 89'	Stadium: Estádio da Luz; Attendance: 53,897; Referee: Bruno Esteves (Setúbal)

18 March 2017 26	Paços de Ferreira	0–0	Benfica	Paços de Ferreira
20:30 WET (UTC±00:00)	Santos (yellow card) 47'; Valente (yellow card) 76'; Melo (yellow card) 90+1'; Andrezinho (yellow card) 90+3'	Report	Eliseu (yellow card) 77'	Stadium: Estádio Capital do Móvel; Attendance: 9,076; Referee: João Pinheiro (Braga)

1 April 2017 27	Benfica	1–1	Porto	Lisbon
20:30 WEST (UTC+01:00)	Jonas 7' (pen.)	Report	M. Pereira 49' (yellow card) 87'; Felipe (yellow card) 6'; André (yellow card) 56'; Marcano (yellow card) 71'; Telles (yellow card) 77'	Stadium: Estádio da Luz; Attendance: 63,323; Referee: Carlos Xistra (Castelo Branco)

9 April 2017 28	Moreirense	0–1	Benfica	Moreira de Cónegos
20:15 WEST (UTC+01:00)	Ivo (yellow card) 36'; Dramé (yellow card) 41'; Saré (yellow card) 70'	Report	Luisão (yellow card) 30'; Mitroglou 42'; Ederson (yellow card) 45+2'; Fejsa (yellow card) 87'; Samaris (yellow card) 89'	Stadium: Parque de Jogos Comendador Joaquim de Almeida Freitas; Attendance: 5,603; Referee: Tiago Martins (Lisbon)

14 April 2017 29	Benfica	3–0	Marítimo	Lisbon
18:15 WEST (UTC+01:00)	Martins 35' (o.g.); Jonas 36', 45'	Report		Stadium: Estádio da Luz; Attendance: 57,074; Referee: Nuno Almeida (Algarve)

22 April 2017 30	Sporting CP	1–1	Benfica	Lisbon
20:30 WEST (UTC+01:00)	A. Silva 5' (pen.); A. Ruiz (yellow card) 64'	Report	Lindelöf 66'; Mitroglou (yellow card) 76'; Jiménez (yellow card) 81'; Luisão (yellow card) 90+2'	Stadium: Estádio José Alvalade; Attendance: 48,765; Referee: Artur Soares Dias (Porto)

29 April 2017 31	Benfica	2–1	Estoril	Lisbon
18:15 WEST (UTC+01:00)	Jonas 29' (pen.), 67'; Semedo (yellow card) 34'	Report	Ailton (yellow card) 20'; Kléber 63'; Allano (yellow card) 64'	Stadium: Estádio da Luz; Attendance: 59,314; Referee: Hugo Miguel (Lisbon)

7 May 2017 32	Rio Ave	0–1	Benfica	Vila do Conde
20:15 WEST (UTC+01:00)	Petrović (yellow card) 52'; Roderick (yellow card) 56'	Report	Cervi (yellow card) 52'; Jiménez 75'	Stadium: Estádio dos Arcos; Attendance: 8,767; Referee: João Pinheiro (Braga)

13 May 2017 33	Benfica	5–0	Vitória de Guimarães	Lisbon
18:15 WEST (UTC+01:00)	Cervi 11'; Jiménez 16'; Pizzi 37'; Jonas 43', 67' (pen.) (yellow card) 44'; Carrillo (yellow card) 80'; Grimaldo (yellow card) 85'	Report	Marega (yellow card) 45'; Gaspar (yellow card) 54'; Tozé (yellow card) 89'	Stadium: Estádio da Luz; Attendance: 64,591; Referee: Jorge Sousa (Porto)

20 May 2017 34	Boavista	2–2	Benfica	Porto
20:30 WEST (UTC+01:00)	Santos 16'; Schembri 52'; Idris (yellow card) 74'; Carvalho (yellow card) 90+3'	Report	Mitroglou (yellow card) 32' (goal) 71'; Filipe Augusto (yellow card) 45'; López (yellow card) 79'; Samaris (yellow card) 86'; Kalaica 90'	Stadium: Estádio do Bessa; Attendance: 16,157; Referee: Nuno Almeida (Algarve)

=== Taça de Portugal ===
==== Third round ====
14 October 2016	1º de Dezembro	1–2	Benfica	Estoril
20:15 WEST (UTC+01:00)	Diatta (yellow card) 53'; Águas 62' (pen.); Rosário (yellow card) 87'; Carvalho (yellow card) 89'; Mendes (yellow card) 90+4'		Danilo 50' (yellow card) 90+2'; López (yellow card) 55'; Ederson (yellow card) 61'; Luisão 90+6'	Stadium: Estádio António Coimbra da Mota; Attendance: 5,349; Referee: Hélder Malheiro (Lisbon)

==== Fourth round ====
19 November 2016	Benfica	6–0	Marítimo	Lisbon
20:15 WET (UTC±00:00)	Cervi 2' (yellow card) 14'; Pizzi 38'; Mitroglou 43', 53'; Jiménez 69' (pen.); Júlio César (yellow card) 84'; Guedes 88'		Sousa (yellow card) 42'; Santos (red card) 68'; Deyvison (yellow card) 72'; Antônio (yellow card) 77'; Fransérgio (yellow card) 82'	Stadium: Estádio da Luz; Attendance: 30,942; Referee: Carlos Xistra (Castelo Branco)

==== Fifth round ====
14 December 2016	Real	0–3	Benfica	Lisbon
19:00 WET (UTC±00:00)	Bernardo (yellow card) 70'		Mitroglou 47', 81' (pen.); López (yellow card) 65'; Jiménez 85'	Stadium: Estádio do Restelo; Attendance: 6,000; Referee: Jorge Ferreira (Braga)

==== Quarter-finals ====
18 January 2017	Benfica	6–2	Leixões	Lisbon
20:30 WET (UTC±00:00)	Pizzi 21'; Almeida 31'; Jonas 38' (yellow card) 50'; Jardel (yellow card) 48'; Mitroglou 60' (pen.), 71', 90+1'		Porcellis 44', 67'; Wellington (yellow card) 50'; Vumbi (yellow card) 59'	Stadium: Estádio da Luz; Attendance: 19,048; Referee: Gonçalo Martins (Vila Real)

==== Semi-finals ====
28 February 2017 1st leg	Estoril	1–2	Benfica	Estoril
20:15 WET (UTC±00:00)	Kléber 41' (pen.) (yellow card) 64'; Mattheus (yellow card) 45'; Yarchuk (yellow card) 80'; (Licá (yellow card) 90+4')		Mitroglou 36', 90'	Stadium: Estádio António Coimbra da Mota; Attendance: 6,807; Referee: Jorge Ferreira (Braga)

5 April 2017 2nd leg	Benfica	3–3 (5–4 agg.)	Estoril	Lisbon
20:15 WEST (UTC+01:00)	Carrillo 33'; Živković 54'; Jonas 72'		Gomes 31', 78'; Carlinhos 46' (yellow card) 90+3'; Allano (yellow card) 83'	Stadium: Estádio da Luz; Attendance: 25,010; Referee: Rui Costa (Porto)

==== Final ====
28 May 2017 Final	Benfica	2–1	Vitória de Guimarães	Oeiras
17:15 WEST (UTC+01:00)	Grimaldo (yellow card) 45+4'; Jiménez 48' (yellow card) 48'; Salvio 53'; Samaris (yellow card) 69'	Report	Gaspar (yellow card) 19'; Marega (yellow card) 21'; Zungu 78'; Sá (yellow card) 88'	Stadium: Estádio Nacional; Attendance: 35,390; Referee: Hugo Miguel (Lisbon); Man of the Match: Eduardo Salvio

=== Taça da Liga ===
==== Third round ====
Pos	Team	Pld	W	D	L	GF	GA	GD	Pts	Qualification	BEN	VGU	PAÇ	VIZ
1	Benfica	3	3	0	0	7	0	+7	9	Advance to knockout phase	—	—	1–0	4–0
2	Vitória de Guimarães	3	1	1	1	4	5	−1	4		0–2	—	2–2	—
3	Paços de Ferreira	3	0	2	1	4	5	−1	2		—	—	—	2–2
4	Vizela	3	0	1	2	3	8	−5	1		—	1–2	—	—

Source: LPFP
Rules for classification: Tiebreakers

29 December 2016 (Note: The matches were originally to be played on 30 November, 29 December and 4 January respectively, but were postponed because of Benfica's tight schedule around the original date of matchday 1.) 1	Benfica	1–0	Paços de Ferreira	Lisbon
21:15 WET (UTC±00:00)	Cervi 39'	Report	Rodrigues (yellow card) 10'; Santos (yellow card) 75'	Stadium: Estádio da Luz; Attendance: 32,945; Referee: Fábio Veríssimo (Leiria)

3 January 2017 2	Benfica	4–0	Vizela	Lisbon
19:15 WET (UTC±00:00)	Mitroglou 27'; López 48'; Jonas 57', 60'	Report		Stadium: Estádio da Luz; Attendance: 18,472; Referee: Manuel Oliveira (Porto)

10 January 2017 3	Vitória de Guimarães	0–2	Benfica	Guimarães
21:15 WET (UTC±00:00)	Zungu (yellow card) 11'; Ferreira (yellow card) 63'; Gaspar (yellow card) 73'; Gouano (yellow card) 78'; Hurtado (yellow card) 83'	Report	Samaris (yellow card) 16'; Guedes 34', 40'; Semedo (yellow card) 41'; Almeida (yellow card) 61'; López (yellow card) 67'	Stadium: Estádio D. Afonso Henriques; Attendance: 15,151; Referee: Carlos Xistra (Castelo Branco)

==== Semi-finals ====
26 January 2017	Moreirense	3–1	Benfica	Faro/Loulé
20:45 WET (UTC±00:00)	Almeida (yellow card) 23'; Dramé 47' (yellow card) 78'; Boateng (yellow card) 35' (goal) 55', 72'; Podence (yellow card) 55'; Makaridze (yellow card) 58'	Report	Salvio 7'; Jonas (yellow card) 52'; Samaris (yellow card) 52'; Eliseu (yellow card) 56'; Pizzi (yellow card) 77'	Stadium: Estádio Algarve; Attendance: 8,935; Referee: Tiago Martins (Lisbon)

=== UEFA Champions League ===
==== Group stage ====
Pos	Team	Pld	W	D	L	GF	GA	GD	Pts	Qualification	NAP	BEN	BES	DKV
1	(Italy) Napoli	6	3	2	1	11	8	+3	11	Advance to knockout phase	—	4–2	2–3	0–0
2	(Portugal) Benfica	6	2	2	2	10	10	0	8	Advance to knockout phase	1–2	—	1–1	1–0
3	(Turkey) Beşiktaş	6	1	4	1	9	14	−5	7	Transfer to Europa League	1–1	3–3	—	1–1
4	(Ukraine) Dynamo Kyiv	6	1	2	3	8	6	+2	5		1–2	0–2	6–0	—

Source: UEFA
Rules for classification: Group stage tiebreakers

13 September 2016 1	Benfica (Portugal)	1–1	(Turkey) Beşiktaş	Lisbon, Portugal
20:45 CEST (UTC+02:00)	Cervi 12'; Samaris (yellow card) 78'; Salvio (yellow card) 87'	Report	Erkin (yellow card) 87'; Beck (yellow card) 88'; Talisca 90+3'	Stadium: Estádio da Luz; Attendance: 42,126; Referee: Milorad Mažić (Serbia)

28 September 2016 2	Napoli (Italy)	4–2	(Portugal) Benfica	Naples, Italy
20:45 CEST (UTC+02:00)	Hamšík 20'; Mertens 51', 58'; Milik 54' (pen.); Reina (yellow card) 86'	Report	López (yellow card) 50'; Júlio César (yellow card) 53'; Carrillo (yellow card) 65'; Guedes 70'; Fejsa (yellow card) 76'; Salvio 86'	Stadium: Stadio San Paolo; Attendance: 41,281; Referee: Felix Brych (Germany)

19 October 2016 3	Dynamo Kyiv (Ukraine)	0–2	(Portugal) Benfica	Kyiv, Ukraine
20:45 CEST (UTC+02:00)	Korzun (yellow card) 34'	Report	Salvio 9' (pen.); Mitroglou (yellow card) 45'; Cervi 55'	Stadium: Olympic Stadium; Attendance: 25,991; Referee: David Fernández Borbalán (Spain)

1 November 2016 4	Benfica (Portugal)	1–0	(Ukraine) Dynamo Kyiv	Lisbon, Portugal
20:45 CET (UTC+01:00)	Salvio 45+2' (pen.); Samaris (yellow card) 79'	Report	González (yellow card) 11'; Morozyuk (yellow card) 15'; Makarenko (yellow card) 44'; Vida (yellow card) 45'; Rybalka (yellow card) 56'; Khacheridi (yellow card) 90+4'	Stadium: Estádio da Luz; Attendance: 51,641; Referee: Clément Turpin (France)

23 November 2016 5	Beşiktaş (Turkey)	3–3	(Portugal) Benfica	Istanbul, Turkey
18:45 CET (UTC+01:00)	Arslan (yellow card) 29'; Tosun 58'; Quaresma 83' (pen.); Aboubakar 89' (yellow card) 90'	Report	Guedes 10'; Semedo 25'; Fejsa 31'; Pizzi (yellow card) 34'; Luisão (yellow card) 76'	Stadium: Vodafone Park; Attendance: 36,063; Referee: Damir Skomina (Slovenia)

6 December 2016 6	Benfica (Portugal)	1–2	(Italy) Napoli	Lisbon, Portugal
20:45 CET (UTC+01:00)	Jiménez 87'; Pizzi (yellow card) 89'	Report	Koulibaly (yellow card) 15'; Callejón 60'; Mertens 79'	Stadium: Estádio da Luz; Attendance: 55,634; Referee: Antonio Mateu Lahoz (Spain)

==== Round of 16 ====
14 February 2017 1st leg	Benfica (Portugal)	1–0	(Germany) Borussia Dortmund	Lisbon, Portugal
20:45 CET (UTC+01:00)	Mitroglou 48'; Fejsa (yellow card) 63'	Report	Schmelzer (yellow card) 74'; Pulisic (yellow card) 85'; Bartra (yellow card) 90'	Stadium: Estádio da Luz; Attendance: 55,124; Referee: Nicola Rizzoli (Italy)

8 March 2017 2nd leg	Borussia Dortmund (Germany)	4–0 (1–4 agg.)	(Portugal) Benfica	Dortmund, Germany
20:45 CET (UTC+01:00)	Aubameyang 4', 61', 85'; Castro (yellow card) 31'; Dembélé (yellow card) 38'; Pulisic 59'; Piszczek (yellow card) 65'	Report	Samaris (yellow card) 33'	Stadium: Westfalenstadion; Attendance: 65,849; Referee: Martin Atkinson (England)

== Statistics ==
=== Squad statistics ===
No.	Pos	Nat	Player	Total		Primeira Liga		Taça de Portugal^{1}		Taça da Liga		UEFA Champions League	
No.	Pos	Nat	Player	Apps	Goals	Apps	Goals	Apps	Goals	Apps	Goals	Apps	Goals
1	GK	(Brazil) BRA	Ederson	40	-27	27	-12	3	-2	3	-3	7	-10
2	DF	(Argentina) ARG	Lisandro López	17	4	6+2	3	4	0	3	1	2	0
3	DF	(Spain) ESP	Álex Grimaldo	21	2	14	2	3	0	0	0	4	0
4	DF	(Brazil) BRA	Luisão	39	1	28	0	4	1	1	0	6	0
5	MF	(Serbia) SRB	Ljubomir Fejsa	35	1	25	0	2	0	1	0	7	1
6	MF	(Brazil) BRA	Filipe Augusto	13	0	1+8	0	2+1	0	0	0	0+1	0
7	MF	(Greece) GRE	Andreas Samaris	32	0	9+9	0	5+2	0	3	0	1+3	0
8	MF	(Portugal) POR	André Horta	16	1	7+3	1	1+1	0	0+2	0	2	0
9	FW	(Mexico) MEX	Raúl Jiménez	32	11	6+13	7	1+4	3	1+1	0	1+5	1
10	FW	(Brazil) BRA	Jonas	28	18	15+4	13	3+1	3	2+2	2	0+1	0
11	FW	(Greece) GRE	Kostas Mitroglou	43	27	26+2	16	5+1	9	1+1	1	6+1	1
12	GK	(Brazil) BRA	Júlio César	15	-14	7+1	-4	5	-6	1	0	1	-4
13	GK	(Portugal) POR	Paulo Lopes	0	0	0	0	0	0	0	0	0	0
14	DF	(Sweden) SWE	Victor Lindelöf	47	1	32	1	5	0	0+2	0	8	0
15	MF	(Peru) PER	André Carrillo	32	3	3+17	2	5+1	1	3	0	2+1	0
16	DF	(Croatia) CRO	Branimir Kalaica (B)	1	1	1	1	0	0	0	0	0	0
17	MF	(Serbia) SRB	Andrija Živković	24	1	10+5	0	5	1	2+1	0	0+1	0
18	MF	(Argentina) ARG	Eduardo Salvio	42	9	26+3	4	2+2	1	1	1	7+1	3
19	DF	(Portugal) POR	Eliseu	20	0	12	0	3	0	1	0	3+1	0
21	MF	(Portugal) POR	Pizzi	52	13	33	10	4+4	3	3	0	8	0
22	MF	(Argentina) ARG	Franco Cervi	41	7	16+10	2	6+1	2	1	1	6+1	2
23	DF	(Portugal) POR	Pedro Pereira	1	0	1	0	0	0	0	0	0	0
27	MF	(Portugal) POR	Rafa Silva	31	2	12+8	2	2+2	0	3+1	0	1+2	0
33	DF	(Brazil) BRA	Jardel	8	0	1	0	3	0	4	0	0	0
34	DF	(Portugal) POR	André Almeida	25	2	10+4	1	3	1	4	0	3+1	0
35	FW	(Serbia) SRB	Luka Jović (B)	2	0	0+1	0	0	0	0+1	0	0	0
38	DF	(Brazil) BRA	Marcelo Hermes	1	0	1	0	0	0	0	0	0	0
50	DF	(Portugal) POR	Nélson Semedo	47	2	31	1	6	0	2	0	8	1
70	FW	(Portugal) POR	José Gomes (B)	5	0	0+3	0	1	0	0	0	0+1	0
95	DF	(Portugal) POR	Yuri Ribeiro (B)	2	0	0	0	1	0	1	0	0	0
Players transferred out during the season
20	FW	(Portugal) POR	Gonçalo Guedes	28	7	14+2	2	1+3	1	2	2	5+1	2
28	MF	(Colombia) COL	Guillermo Celis	7	0	0+3	0	1	0	1	0	0+2	0
37	MF	(Brazil) BRA	Danilo	5	1	0+2	0	2+1	1	0	0	0	0

(B) – Benfica B player

Includes Supertaça Cândido de Oliveira

=== Goalscorers ===
Rnk	Pos	Player	League	Cup^{1}	League Cup	Champions League	Total
1	FW	(Greece) Kostas Mitroglou	16	9	1	1	27
2	FW	(Brazil) Jonas	13	3	2	0	18
3	MF	(Portugal) Pizzi	10	3	0	0	13
4	FW	(Mexico) Raúl Jiménez	7	3	0	1	11
4	MF	(Argentina) Eduardo Salvio	4	1	1	3	9
6	FW	(Portugal) Gonçalo Guedes	2	1	2	2	7
6	MF	(Argentina) Franco Cervi	2	2	1	2	7
8	DF	(Argentina) Lisandro López	3	0	1	0	4
9	MF	(Peru) André Carrillo	2	1	0	0	3
10	DF	(Spain) Álex Grimaldo	2	0	0	0	2
10	DF	(Portugal) Nélson Semedo	1	0	0	1	2
10	MF	(Portugal) Rafa Silva	2	0	0	0	2
10	DF	(Portugal) André Almeida	1	1	0	0	2
14	MF	(Portugal) André Horta	1	0	0	0	1
14	MF	(Brazil) Danilo	0	1	0	0	1
14	DF	(Brazil) Luisão	0	1	0	0	1
14	MF	(Serbia) Ljubomir Fejsa	0	0	0	1	1
14	MF	(Serbia) Andrija Živković	0	1	0	0	1
14	DF	(Sweden) Victor Lindelöf	1	0	0	0	1
14	DF	(Croatia) Branimir Kalaica	1	0	0	0	1
Own goals			4	0	0	0	4
Totals			72	27	8	11	118

Includes Supertaça Cândido de Oliveira

=== Hat-tricks ===
Player	Against	Result	Date	Competition
(Greece) Kostas Mitroglou	Leixões	6–2 (H)	18 January 2017	Taça de Portugal

(H) – Home; (A) – Away

=== Clean sheets ===
Number of appearances inside brackets.

Rnk	Player	League	Cup^{1}	League Cup	Champions League	Total
1	(Brazil) Ederson	18* (27)	1 (3)	2 (3)	3 (7)	24 (40)
2	(Brazil) Júlio César	3* (8**)	2 (5)	1	0	6 (15)
3	(Portugal) Paulo Lopes	1 (**)	—	—	—	1
Totals		20 (34)	3 (8)	3 (4)	3 (8)	29 (54)

Includes Supertaça Cândido de Oliveira

* Shared clean sheet on Round 21 against Arouca

** Shared match on Round 34 against Boavista

=== Disciplinary record ===
N	P	Nat.	Name	League			Cup			League Cup			Champions League			Total			Notes
N	P	Nat.	Name	Yellow card	Second yellow card	Red card	Yellow card	Second yellow card	Red card	Yellow card	Second yellow card	Red card	Yellow card	Second yellow card	Red card	Yellow card	Second yellow card	Red card	Notes
1	GK	(Brazil)	Ederson	4			1		1							5		1	ForaDeJogo data
21	MF	(Portugal)	Pizzi	4	1					1			2			7	1		ForaDeJogo data
7	MF	(Greece)	Andreas Samaris	5			1			2			3			11			Includes a yellow card while on the bench - ForaDeJogo data
2	DF	(Argentina)	Lisandro López	4			2			1			1			8			ForaDeJogo data
50	DF	(Portugal)	Nélson Semedo	6			1			1						8			Cup includes Super Cup - ForaDeJogo data
4	DF	(Brazil)	Luisão	4									1			5			ForaDeJogo data
5	MF	(Serbia)	Ljubomir Fejsa	3									2			5			ForaDeJogo data
15	MF	(Peru)	André Carrillo	4									1			5			ForaDeJogo data
9	FW	(Mexico)	Raúl Jiménez	3			1									4			ForaDeJogo data
10	FW	(Brazil)	Jonas	2			1			1						4			ForaDeJogo data
3	DF	(Spain)	Álex Grimaldo	1			2									3			Cup includes Super Cup - ForaDeJogo data
11	FW	(Greece)	Kostas Mitroglou	2									1			3			ForaDeJogo data
19	DF	(Portugal)	Eliseu	2						1						3			ForaDeJogo data
22	MF	(Argentina)	Franco Cervi	2			1									3			ForaDeJogo data
33	DF	(Brazil)	Jardel	2			1									3			Includes an after-match yellow card - ForaDeJogo data
8	MF	(Portugal)	André Horta	2												2			ForaDeJogo data
12	GK	(Brazil)	Júlio César				1						1			2			ForaDeJogo data
18	MF	(Argentina)	Eduardo Salvio	1									1			2			ForaDeJogo data
37	MF	(Brazil)	Danilo	1			1									2			ForaDeJogo data
6	MF	(Brazil)	Filipe Augusto	1												1			ForaDeJogo data
14	DF	(Sweden)	Victor Lindelöf	1												1			ForaDeJogo data
20	FW	(Portugal)	Gonçalo Guedes	1												1			ForaDeJogo data
34	DF	(Portugal)	André Almeida							1						1			ForaDeJogo data

Source: LPFP and links in notes.
Ordered by (red card) , (second yellow card) and (yellow card)
(yellow card) = Number of bookings; (second yellow card) = Number of sending offs after a second yellow card; (red card) = Number of sending offs by a direct red card.

== Awards ==
=== Player ===
No.	Pos	Name	Award	Month/Year	Ref
21	MF	(Portugal) Pizzi	Liga Portugal/Samsung Best Player	October/November	
21	MF	(Portugal) Pizzi	Liga Portugal/Samsung Best Player	December	
21	MF	(Portugal) Pizzi	SJPF Primeira Liga Team of the Year	2016	
21	MF	(Portugal) Pizzi	LPFP Primeira Liga Best Player	2017	
20	FW	(Portugal) Gonçalo Guedes	SJPF Young Player of the Month	October/November	
27	MF	(Portugal) Rafa Silva	Samsung Goal of the Month	January	
50	DF	(Portugal) Nélson Semedo	SJPF Young Player of the Month	February	
50	DF	(Portugal) Nélson Semedo	SJPF Primeira Liga Team of the Year	2016	
50	DF	(Portugal) Nélson Semedo	LPFP Primeira Liga Breakthrough Player	2017	
1	GK	(Brazil) Ederson	SJPF Primeira Liga Team of the Year	2016	
1	GK	(Brazil) Ederson	LPFP Primeira Liga Best Goalkeeper	2017	
11	FW	(Greece) Kostas Mitroglou	SJPF Primeira Liga Team of the Year	2016	
14	DF	(Sweden) Victor Lindelöf	SJPF Primeira Liga Team of the Year	2016	
14	DF	(Sweden) Victor Lindelöf	Cosme Damião Award – Revelation of the Year	2016	
14	DF	(Sweden) Victor Lindelöf	SJPF Goal of the Month	April	
10	FW	(Brazil) Jonas	SJPF Primeira Liga Team of the Year	2016	
10	FW	(Brazil) Jonas	Cosme Damião Award – Footballer of the Year	2016	
10	FW	(Brazil) Jonas	Liga Portugal/Samsung Best Player	April	
10	FW	(Brazil) Jonas	Samsung Goal of the Month	April	

=== Manager ===
Name	Award	Year	Ref
(Portugal) Rui Vitória	Cosme Damião Award – Manager of the Year	2016	
(Portugal) Rui Vitória	LPFP Primeira Liga Best Coach	2017	
