= 2016 Algarve Football Cup =

Tournament details
- Host country: Portugal
- Dates: 14–16 July
- Teams: 3 (from 1 confederation)
- Venue: 1 (in 1 host city)

Final positions
- Champions: (Portugal) Benfica (1st title)
- Runners-up: (Portugal) Vitória de Setúbal
- Third place: (England) Derby County

Tournament statistics
- Matches played: 3
- Goals scored: 5 (1.67 per match)
- Top scorer(s): (Portugal) André Almeida (Portugal) Costinha (Argentina) Eduardo Salvio (Portugal) Nélson Semedo (Portugal) Rui Fonte (1 goal)

The 2016 Algarve Football Cup was a summer football friendly tournament. It was hosted at the Estádio Algarve in the Algarve in Portugal, between the 14 and 16 July 2016. It involved Benfica and Vitória de Setúbal of the Portuguese Primeira Liga and English Championship side Derby County.

== Overview ==
=== Participants ===
Nation	Team	Location	Confederation	League
Portugal	Benfica	Lisbon	UEFA	Primeira Liga
England	Derby County	Derby	UEFA	Championship
Portugal	Vitória de Setúbal	Setúbal	UEFA	Primeira Liga

=== Standings ===
Each team will play two matches, with three points awarded for a win, one point for a draw, and zero points for a defeat. In the first two matches of the 2016 Algarve Football Cup, a penalty shoot-out took place afterwards. That's despite Vitória de Setúbal beating Derby County in Game 2. A shoot-out did not take place after Benfica's match against Derby.

Rank	Team	GP	W	D	L	GF	GA	GD	Pts
1	(Portugal) Benfica	2	1	1	0	4	0	+4	4
2	(Portugal) Vitória de Setúbal	2	1	1	0	1	0	+1	4
3	(England) Derby County	2	0	0	2	0	5	–5	0

=== Matches ===
14 July	Benfica (Portugal)	0–0 (3–3 p)	(Portugal) Vitória de Setúbal	Algarve, Portugal
20:30 WEST		Report		Stadium: Estádio Algarve; Referee: Cristiano Pires (Portugal)
	Penalties
	L. López (penalty missed); E. Salvio (penalty scored); A. Almeida (penalty scored); F. Cervi (penalty scored); B. Kalaica (penalty missed)		(penalty missed) M. Nader; (penalty scored) A. Meyong; (penalty missed) V. Costa; (penalty scored) Ruca; (penalty scored) A. Issoko

15 July	Vitória de Setúbal (Portugal)	1–0 (3–3 p)	(England) Derby County XI	Algarve, Portugal
20:30 WEST	Costinha 11'	Report		Stadium: Estádio Algarve
	Penalties
	Penalty scored		(penalty scored) A. Babos; (penalty scored) C. Macdonald; (penalty scored) E. R. Jakobsen

16 July	Benfica (Portugal)	4–0	(England) Derby County	Algarve, Portugal
20:30 WEST	N. Semedo 16'; R. Fonte 54'; A. Almeida 63'; E. Salvio 90'	Report		Stadium: Estádio Algarve; Referee: Pedro Oliveira (Portugal)

=== Goalscorers ===
Rank	Name	Team	Goals
1	(Portugal) André Almeida	(Portugal) Benfica	1
1	(Portugal) Costinha	(Portugal) Vitória de Setúbal	1
1	(Argentina) Eduardo Salvio	(Portugal) Benfica	1
1	(Portugal) Nélson Semedo	(Portugal) Benfica	1
1	(Portugal) Rui Fonte	(Portugal) Benfica	1

== Media coverage ==
Market	Countries	Broadcast partner	Ref
Angola	1	Sport TV (Portuguese)	
Cape Verde	1	Sport TV (Portuguese)	
Mozambique	1	Sport TV (Portuguese)	
Portugal	1	Benfica TV (Portuguese)	
United States	1	FuboTV (English)	
Total countries	5		
