= André Lopes =

André Lopes may refer to:

- André Lopes (volleyball) (born 1982), Portuguese volleyball player
- André Lopes (footballer) (born 2001), Portuguese footballer

== See also ==
- Andrey Lopes (born 1978), Brazilian football manager
