= Guillermo Celis =

Colombian footballer (born 1993)

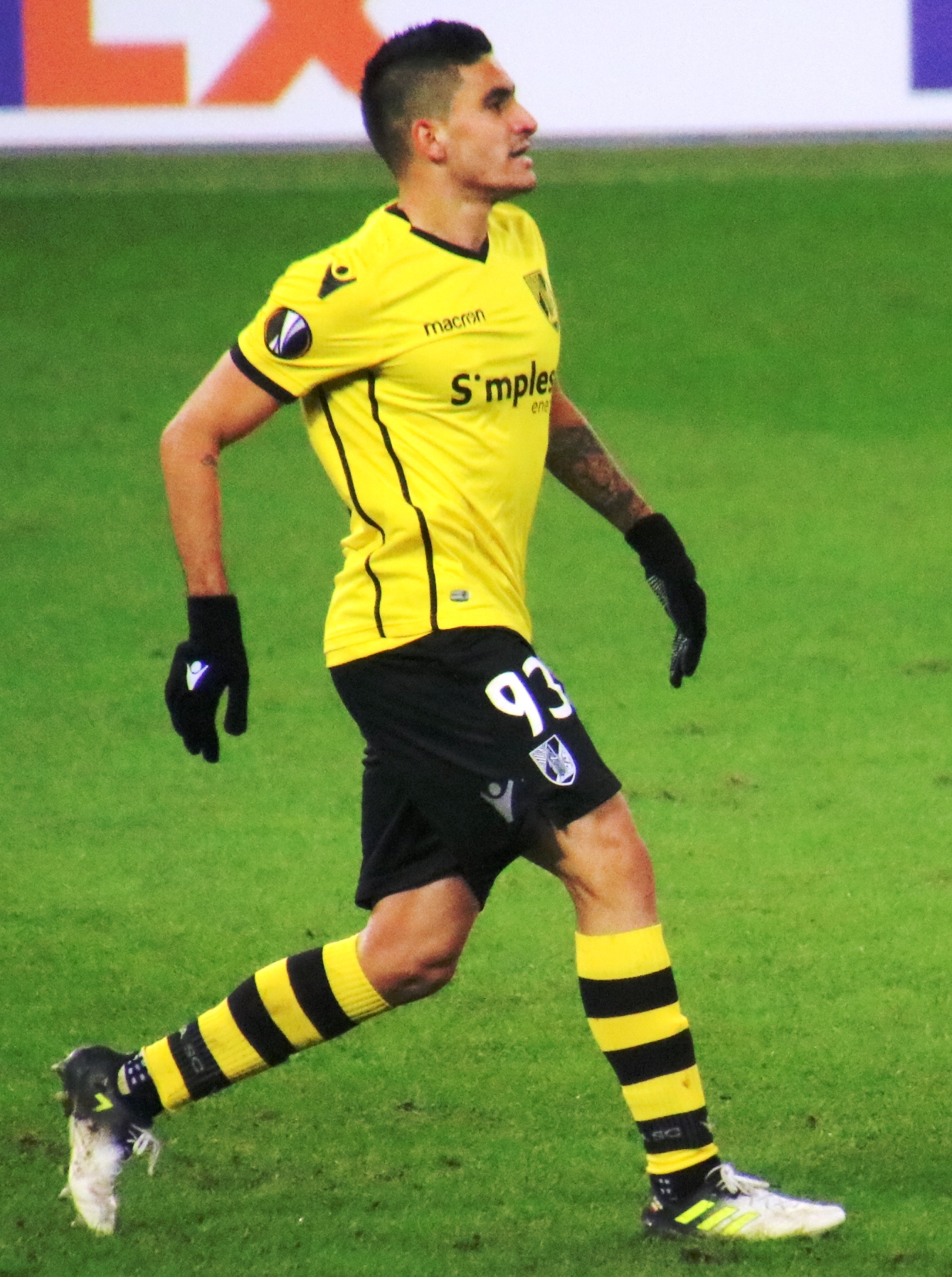
- Celis with Vitória Guimarães in 2017

Personal information
- Full name: Guillermo León Celis Montiel
- Date of birth: 8 May 1993 (age 33)
- Place of birth: Sincelejo, Colombia
- Height: 1.77 m (5 ft 10 in)
- Position: Defensive midfielder

Team information
- Current team: Junior
- Number: 28

Youth career
- 2011: Barranquilla

Senior career*
Years	Team	Apps	(Gls)
2011	Barranquilla	1	(0)
2012–2016	Junior	96	(6)
2013	→ Barranquilla (loan)	1	(0)
2016–2017	Benfica	3	(0)
2017	→ Vitória Guimarães (loan)	13	(0)
2017–2020	Vitória Guimarães	19	(1)
2019–2020	→ Colón (loan)	5	(0)
2020–2022	Deportes Tolima	21	(2)
2022–2023	Once Caldas	24	(0)
2023–2025	Rionegro Águilas	68	(3)
2025–	Junior	41	(0)

International career^{‡}
2013	Colombia U20	3	(0)
2016	Colombia Olympic	2	(0)
2016–2017	Colombia	6	(0)
Medal record
Colombia
Copa América Centenario
Bronze medal – third place	2016 United States
- * Club domestic league appearances and goals as of 23:17, 5 May 2019 (UTC) ‡ National team caps and goals as of 26 March 2019

Guillermo León Celis Montiel (born 8 May 1993) is a Colombian professional footballer who plays as a midfielder for Categoria Primera A club Junior.

== Club statistics ==
As of match played 22 January 2017

Club	Season	League			Cup (Note: Includes Copa Colombia, Superliga Colombiana, Taça de Portugal and Taça da Liga.)		Continental		Total	
Club	Season	Division	Apps	Goals	Apps	Goals	Apps	Goals	Apps	Goals
Junior	2013	Categoría Primera A	20	2	6	0	0	0	26	2
Junior	2014	Categoría Primera A	28	0	10	0	0	0	38	0
Junior	2015	Categoría Primera A	34	4	12	0	4	0	50	4
Junior	2016	Categoría Primera A	13	0	0	0	0	0	13	0
Junior	Total		95	6	28	0	4	0	127	6
Benfica	2016–17	Primeira Liga	3	0	2	0	2	0	7	0
Career total			98	6	30	0	6	0	134	6

== Honours ==
=== Club ===
Junior

- Copa Colombia: 2015

Benfica

- Primeira Liga: 2016–17
- Supertaça Cândido de Oliveira: 2016

=== International ===
Colombia

- Copa América: Third place 2016
