= André Almeida (footballer, born 1990) =

Portuguese footballer

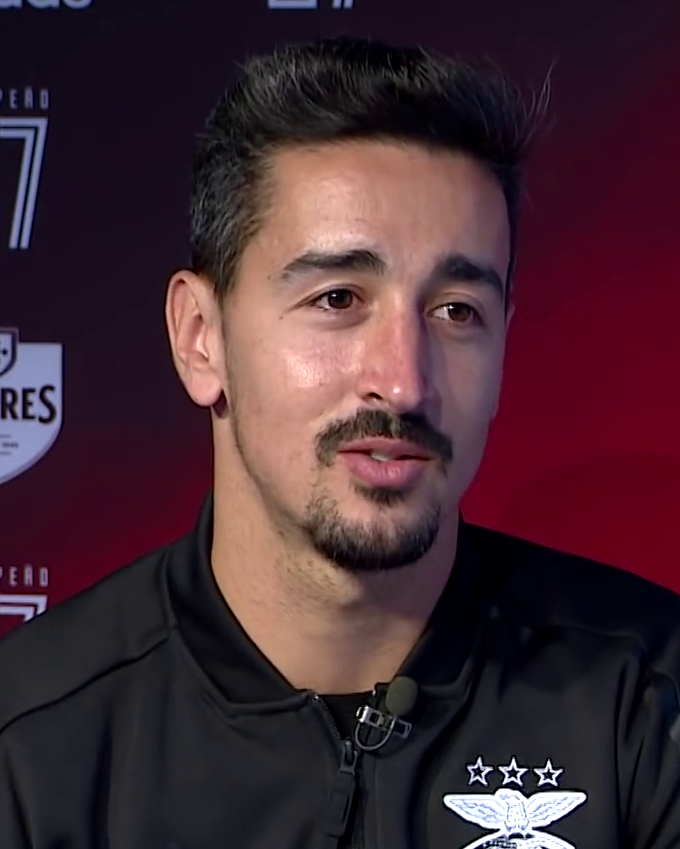
- Almeida with Benfica in 2019

Personal information
- Full name: André Gomes Magalhães de Almeida
- Date of birth: 10 September 1990 (age 36)
- Place of birth: Lisbon, Portugal
- Height: 1.85 m (6 ft 1 in)
- Positions: Full-back; midfielder

Youth career
- 1999–2002: Loures
- 2002–2003: Sporting CP
- 2003–2007: Alverca
- 2007–2009: Belenenses

Senior career*
Years	Team	Apps	(Gls)
2009–2011	Belenenses	42	(3)
2011–2023	Benfica	193	(9)
2011	→ União Leiria (loan)	11	(1)
2012–2013	Benfica B	7	(1)
Total		253	(14)

International career
2008	Portugal U18	5	(1)
2008–2009	Portugal U19	4	(0)
2010	Portugal U20	4	(2)
2010–2012	Portugal U21	17	(0)
2013–2015	Portugal	8	(0)
- * Club domestic league appearances and goals

André Gomes Magalhães de Almeida (Portuguese pronunciation: [ɐ̃ˈdɾɛ alˈmɐjðɐ]; born 10 September 1990) is a Portuguese retired professional footballer who spent most of his career playing for Benfica, mainly as a right-back but on occasion as a defensive midfielder or left-back. He earned 8 caps for the Portugal national team from 2013 to 2015.

== Club career ==
=== Belenenses ===
After playing for three other youth clubs in his hometown of Lisbon, Almeida finished his formation with Belenenses. He made his top division debut on 11 January 2009 by playing one minute in a 0–1 loss against Rio Ave, and finished his first full season with 20 games and one goal as the club suffered relegation.

Almeida appeared in 18 matches in the 2010–11 campaign and scored twice, but Belenenses could only rank in 13th position in the second level.

=== Benfica ===
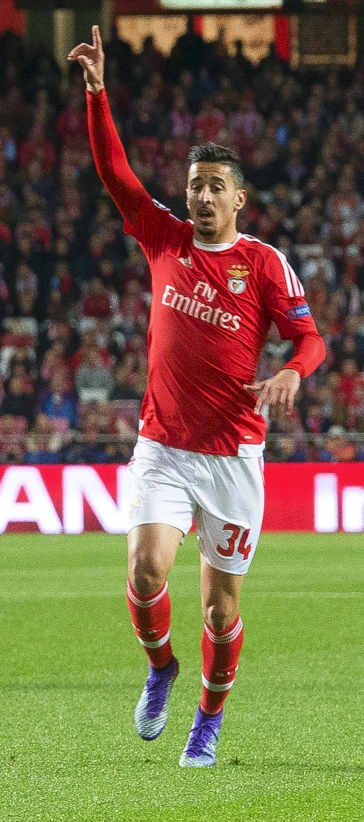
Almeida playing for Benfica in 2016

Almeida signed for S.L. Benfica in the 2011 summer, being immediately loaned to fellow top flight side U.D. Leiria. In December, however, he was recalled by the parent club, going on to make four official appearances for the first team until the end of the season, including 90 minutes in a 2–0 home win over C.D. Santa Clara for the domestic league cup, which Benfica won for the fourth time in a row.

Almeida started 2012–13 with Benfica B in division two. However, following the sales of Javi García and Axel Witsel in the last minutes of the summer transfer window, he started being called regularly to the main squad, either as a backup to Maxi Pereira at right back or in centre midfield.

Almeida made his UEFA Champions League debut on 19 September 2012 in a 0–0 draw at Celtic. He also played the full 90 minutes in the second group stage game between the two teams, a 2–1 home success; on both occasions, he starred in the right side of defense. On 18 January 2017, Almeida scored his first goal for Benfica in a 6–2 home win over Leixões in the Taça de Portugal quarter-finals.

After the departure of Jardel in June 2021, Almeida became the team's captain, with Nicolás Otamendi taking his place in the 2022–23 season.

== International career ==
Almeida gained 30 caps for Portugal all youth categories comprised, including 17 for the under-21 team. He made his debut with the full side on 11 October 2013, playing the full 90 minutes as a right back in a 1–1 home draw against Israel for the 2014 FIFA World Cup qualifiers.

On 19 May 2014, Almeida was named by manager Paulo Bento in the final 23-man squad for the tournament in Brazil. He made his debut in the competition on 16 June, replacing injured Fábio Coentrão in the second half of an eventual 0–4 group stage loss to Germany.

== Career statistics ==
=== Club ===
As of match played 30 April 2022

Club	Season	League			National Cup		League Cup		Europe		Other		Total	
Club	Season	Division	Apps	Goals	Apps	Goals	Apps	Goals	Apps	Goals	Apps	Goals	Apps	Goals
Belenenses	2008–09	Primeira Liga	4	0	0	0	0	0	—				4	0
Belenenses	2009–10	Primeira Liga	20	1	3	0	1	0	—				24	1
Belenenses	2010–11	Primeira Liga	18	2	1	0	2	0	—				21	2
Belenenses	Total		42	3	4	0	3	0	—				49	3
União de Leiria (loan)	2011–12	Primeira Liga	11	1	1	0	0	0	—				12	1
Benfica	2011–12	Primeira Liga	3	0	0	0	1	0	0	0	—		4	0
Benfica	2012–13	Primeira Liga	14	0	5	0	3	0	12	0	—		34	0
Benfica	2013–14	Primeira Liga	10	0	3	0	4	0	9	0	—		26	0
Benfica	2014–15	Primeira Liga	20	0	3	0	2	0	6	0	0	0	31	0
Benfica	2015–16	Primeira Liga	26	0	1	0	2	0	8	0	0	0	37	0
Benfica	2016–17	Primeira Liga	14	1	3	1	4	0	4	0	—		25	2
Benfica	2017–18	Primeira Liga	31	2	2	0	2	0	4	0	1	0	40	2
Benfica	2018–19	Primeira Liga	33	2	3	0	4	0	13	0	—		53	2
Benfica	2019–20	Primeira Liga	23	4	3	0	0	0	1	0	0	0	27	4
Benfica	2020–21	Primeira Liga	4	0	0	0	0	0	1	0	0	0	5	0
Benfica	2021–22	Primeira Liga	15	0	3	1	1	0	7	0	—		26	1
Benfica	2022–23	Primeira Liga	0	0	0	0	0	0	0	0	—		0	0
Benfica	Total		193	9	26	2	23	0	65	0	1	0	308	11
Benfica B	2012–13	Segunda Liga	6	1	—								6	1
Benfica B	2013–14	Segunda Liga	1	0	—								1	0
Benfica B	Total		7	1	—								7	1
Career total			253	14	31	2	26	0	65	0	1	0	376	16

=== International ===
National team	Year	Apps	Goals
Portugal	2013	2	0
Portugal	2014	5	0
Portugal	2015	1	0
Total		8	0

== Honours ==
Benfica

- Primeira Liga: 2013–14, 2014–15, 2015–16, 2016–17, 2018–19
- Taça de Portugal: 2013–14, 2016–17
- Taça da Liga: 2011–12, 2013–14, 2014–15, 2015–16
- Supertaça Cândido de Oliveira: 2014, 2016, 2017
- UEFA Europa League runner-up: 2012–13, 2013–14
