= Andreas Samaris =

Greek footballer (born 1989)

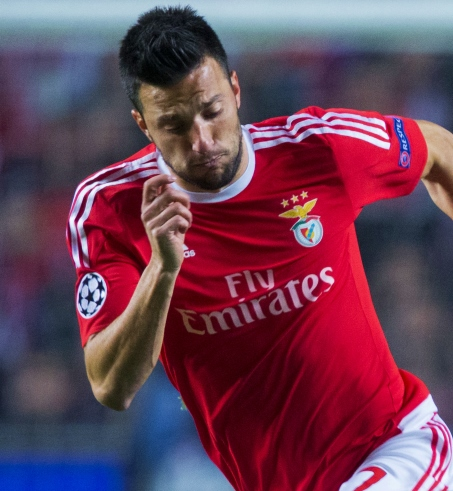
- Samaris playing for Benfica in 2016

Personal information
- Date of birth: 13 June 1989 (age 37)
- Place of birth: Patras, Greece
- Height: 1.89 m (6 ft 2 in)
- Position: Defensive midfielder

Youth career
- 2006–2007: Panachaiki

Senior career*
Years	Team	Apps	(Gls)
2007–2010	Panachaiki	37	(3)
2010–2012	Panionios	49	(1)
2012–2014	Olympiacos	28	(4)
2012–2013	→ Panionios (loan)	21	(5)
2014–2021	Benfica	132	(5)
2021–2022	Fortuna Sittard	20	(0)
2022–2023	Rio Ave	24	(0)
2023	Coritiba	4	(0)
Total		315	(18)

International career
2007	Greece U19	1	(0)
2013–2019	Greece	39	(1)
- * Club domestic league appearances and goals as of 2 November 2023

Andreas Samaris (Greek: Ανδρέας Σάμαρης; born 13 June 1989) is a Greek former professional footballer who played as a midfielder.

After winning the Super League Greece with Olympiakos in 2014, he signed with Benfica in Portugal for €10 million. With them, he won four Primeira Liga, one Taça de Portugal, two Taça da Liga and two Supertaça Cândido de Oliveira.

A full international from 2013 to 2019, Samaris represented Greece at the 2014 FIFA World Cup.

== Club career ==
=== Greece ===
Samaris started his career in Gamma Ethniki side Panachaiki in 2006, making a total of 37 league appearances and scored three goals for the club. On 10 April 2007, he signed his first professional contract with Panachaiki, where he was coached by future Australia national team manager Ange Postecoglou. On 11 January 2010, Samaris moved to Panionios.

Samaris joined Olympiacos in 2012 but spent the season on loan at Panionios. In 2013, he returned to Olympiacos and scored his first goal with the club on 23 November 2013, in an away 4–1 victory against Panthrakikos. Samaris ended the league with 38 appearances and scored four goals en route to the Piraeus-based club's 41st title.

=== Benfica ===
On 22 August 2014, Samaris moved abroad and joined Portuguese champions Benfica on a five-year contract for a transfer fee of €10 million and with a €45 million release clause. He made his debut for Benfica on 12 September against Vitória Sétubal.

At the end of the 2014–15 season, Samaris mentioned that the Portuguese language was a barrier in his first year with the club. The Greek international stressed the importance of learning it by stating, "I liked to learn Portuguese because I became closer to my colleagues. The most important is to understand what my coach says because there was an idea of game and I had to adapt faster than the others."

On 29 August 2015, in the second day of 2015–16 Primeira Liga, Samaris, after an assist from Greek teammate Kostas Mitroglou, scored with a right-footed shot from outside the box to the bottom left corner, the second goal giving the lead to his club in a 3–2 win against Moreirense. It was his first goal in the Primeira Liga. On 1 April 2016, he scored his second goal in the Portuguese league, with a direct free kick, in a 5–1 home game against Braga. On 4 March 2017, in a 1–0 away game against C.D. Feirense, Samaris reached 100 appearances with the jersey of Benfica. In that season, he also played in the Taça de Portugal final, which Benfica won over Vitória de Guimarães (2–1).

On 11 March 2019, Samaris scored a volley in a league match, giving his team a two-goal lead in an eventual 2–2 home draw to Belenenses. It was his first goal in the 2018–19 season in all competitions. On 14 May, he extended his contract with Benfica until 2023.

On 31 August 2021, Samaris agreed with the club for the termination of his contract.

=== Later career ===
On 19 November 2021, Fortuna Sittard announced the acquisition of Samaris until the end of the season. On 27 November 2021, he made his debut with the club as a late substitute in a 1–4 loss against FC Groningen.

On 29 August 2022, Samaris returned to Portugal and signed a one-season contract with Rio Ave.

On 27 August 2023, Brazilian club Coritiba announced the signing of Samaris on a one-year deal.

== International career ==
Samaris is a former Greece under-19 international. He made his debut in a 2008 European Under-19 Championship qualifier against France. In October 2013, he was called up to the Greek senior side by manager Fernando Santos and made a substitute appearance in the final group qualifier against Liechtenstein, also coming off the bench in the two play-off matches against Romania. After a strong season with Olympiakos, Santos opted to select Samaris to his final 23-man squad for the 2014 FIFA World Cup.

On 24 June 2014, in his first appearance in a final tournament of the World Cup and against the Ivory Coast, Samaris opened the scoring after capitalizing on Cheick Tioté's defensive mistake in the 42nd minute in an eventual 2–1 victory; Samaris came on as an early replacement for the injured Panagiotis Kone.

== Career statistics ==
=== Club ===
As of match played 2 November 2023

Appearances and goals by club, season and competition
Club	Season	League			National Cup		League Cup (Note: Includes Taça da Liga and Supertaça Cândido de Oliveira)		Continental		Total	
Club	Season	Division	Apps	Goals	Apps	Goals	Apps	Goals	Apps	Goals	Apps	Goals
Panachaiki	2006–07	Gamma Ethniki	4	0	0	0	—		—		4	0
Panachaiki	2007–08	Gamma Ethniki	19	3	0	0	—		—		19	3
Panachaiki	2008–09	Gamma Ethniki	14	0	0	0	—		—		14	0
Panachaiki	2009–10	Gamma Ethniki	0	0	1	0	—		—		1	0
Panachaiki	Total		37	3	1	0	—		—		38	3
Panionios	2009–10	Super League Greece	2	0	0	0	—		—		2	0
Panionios	2010–11	Super League Greece	20	1	0	0	—		—		20	1
Panionios	2011–12	Super League Greece	27	0	3	0	—		—		30	0
Panionios	2012–13 (loan)	Super League Greece	21	5	1	0	—		—		22	5
Panionios	Total		70	6	4	0	—		—		74	6
Olympiacos	2013–14	Super League Greece	28	4	4	0	—		6 (Note: Appearances in UEFA Champions League)	0	38	4
Benfica	2014–15	Primeira Liga	28	0	1	0	3	0	5	0	37	0
Benfica	2015–16	Primeira Liga	27	2	1	0	6	0	7	0	41	2
Benfica	2016–17	Primeira Liga	18	0	6	0	4	0	4	0	32	0
Benfica	2017–18	Primeira Liga	18	1	1	0	3	0	3	0	25	1
Benfica	2018–19	Primeira Liga	19	2	3	0	2	0	3 (Note: Appearances in UEFA Europa League)	0	27	2
Benfica	2019–20	Primeira Liga	16	0	2	0	4	0	2 (Note: One appearance in UEFA Champions League, one appearance in UEFA Europa League)	0	24	0
Benfica	2020–21	Primeira Liga	6	0	3	1	0	0	0	0	9	1
Benfica	Total		132	5	17	1	22	0	24	0	195	6
Fortuna Sittard	2021–22	Eredivisie	20	0	0	0	0	0	0	0	20	0
Rio Ave	2022–23	Primeira Liga	24	0	1	0	2	0	0	0	27	0
Coritiba	2023	Série A	4	0	—		—		—		4	0
Career total			315	18	27	1	24	0	30	0	396	19

=== International ===
As of match played 11 June 2019

National team	Year	Apps	Goals
Greece	2013	3	0
Greece	2014	8	1
Greece	2015	9	0
Greece	2016	7	0
Greece	2017	4	0
Greece	2018	2	0
Greece	2019	5	0
Total		38	1

Goal	Date	Venue	Opponent	Score	Result	Competition
1	24 June 2014	Estádio Castelão‚ Fortaleza, Brazil	Ivory Coast	1–0	2–1	2014 FIFA World Cup

== Honours ==
Olympiacos

- Super League Greece: 2013–14

Benfica

- Primeira Liga: 2014–15, 2015–16, 2016–17, 2018–19
- Taça de Portugal: 2016–17
- Taça da Liga: 2014–15, 2015–16
- Supertaça Cândido de Oliveira: 2016, 2017
