= Rui Vitória =

Portuguese football manager (born 1970)

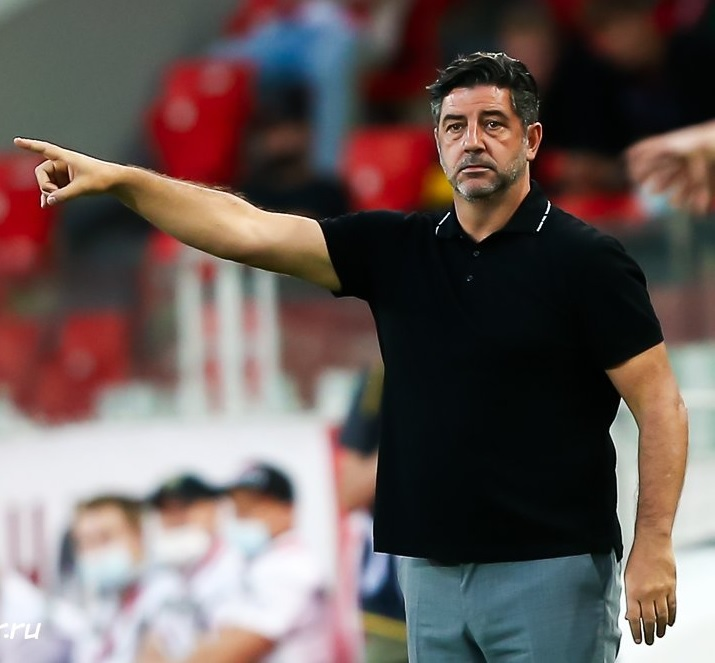
- Vitória managing Spartak Moscow in 2021

Personal information
- Full name: Rui Carlos Pinho da Vitória
- Date of birth: 16 April 1970 (age 56)
- Place of birth: Alverca do Ribatejo, Portugal
- Height: 1.80 m (5 ft 11 in)
- Position: Midfielder

Team information
- Current team: Al Wasl (head coach)

Youth career
- 1986–1988: Alverca

Senior career*
Years	Team	Apps	(Gls)
1988–1990	Fanhões		
1990–1996	Vilafranquense		
1996–1997	Alverca	18	(1)
1997–1999	Vilafranquense		
1999–2001	Seixal	26	(0)
2001–2002	Casa Pia	11	(1)
2002–2003	Alcochetense		

Managerial career
- 2002–2004: Vilafranquense
- 2004–2006: Juniores do Benfica
- 2006–2010: Fátima
- 2010–2011: Paços Ferreira
- 2011–2015: Vitória Guimarães
- 2015–2019: Benfica
- 2019–2020: Al Nassr
- 2021: Spartak Moscow
- 2022–2024: Egypt
- 2024–2025: Panathinaikos
- 2026–: Al Wasl
- * Club domestic league appearances and goals

Rui Carlos Pinho da Vitória (Portuguese pronunciation: [ˈʁuj viˈtɔɾjɐ]; born 16 April 1970) is a Portuguese football manager and a former player who played as a midfielder. He is the currently head coach of UAE Pro League club Al Wasl.

As a manager, he most notably spent three and a half years with Benfica in Portugal, winning seven major trophies, which included two consecutive Primeira Liga titles, before subsequently having periods in charge at Al Nassr, Spartak Moscow and the Egyptian national team. He was appointed Panathinaikos manager in October 2024 before being sacked in September 2025.

== Playing career ==
Vitória was born in Alverca do Ribatejo, Vila Franca de Xira. During his career, in which he played for five clubs, he never competed in higher than the third division (four seasons), also spending eleven years in the fourth. He mainly represented U.D. Vilafranquense, in the Lisbon area.

A midfielder, Vitória retired as a player in 2003, aged 32.

== Managerial career ==
=== Early years and Fátima ===
After starting as a manager with his main team Vilafranquense, Vitória moved in 2004 to Benfica, spending two seasons with its junior side.

In 2006, Vitória signed for Fátima, helping the club promote to the second level in his first season, followed by immediate relegation back. In 2008–09, again as champion, he again led the side to division two.

=== Paços de Ferreira ===
On 2 June 2010, Vitória replaced Ulisses Morais at the helm of Paços de Ferreira. In his first season in the top division, he guided the team to the seventh position in the league, also achieving runner-up honours in the domestic League Cup, which was won by Benfica (2–1).

=== Vitória de Guimarães ===
In late August 2011, Vitória replaced fired Manuel Machado as the manager of Vitória de Guimarães. In his second year, he led the club to the conquest of the Portuguese Cup against Benfica (2–1), in a first-ever for the Minho Province side. Later, on 10 August 2013, he was runner-up in the Supertaça, losing 3–0 to Porto.

=== Benfica ===
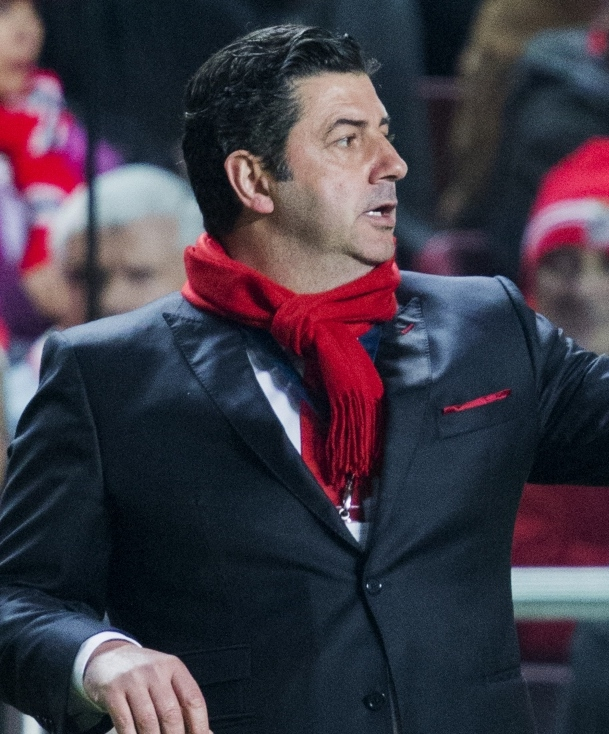
Vitória with Benfica against Zenit Saint Petersburg in 2016

On 15 June 2015, Portuguese champions Benfica announced that Vitória had signed a three-year contract with the club. He started the season by losing the Supertaça 1–0 to Lisbon rivals Sporting. Despite a troubled start, Benfica secured a third Primeira Liga title in a row and 35th overall with a 4–1 win over Nacional at the Estádio da Luz on the final matchday, establishing a Portuguese league record of 88 points in 34 matches. Also, with a 1–0 league win at Boavista, Vitória set a Benfica record of 11 consecutive away triumphs in all competitions. Moreover, he also managed the team to the quarter-finals of the UEFA Champions League and to their seventh Taça da Liga trophy, beating Marítimo 6–2. Later that season, he received Primeira Liga's award for Best Coach.

Vitória started the 2016–17 season by winning his first Portuguese Super Cup on his third attempt, with a 3–0 win over Braga; therefore, he succeeded in winning all four major trophies in Portugal. On 23 October 2016, he surpassed Jimmy Hagan's 43-year-old record of 15 consecutive away wins in the league, achieving the 16th as Benfica defeated Belenenses 2–0 away. Later, on 7 April 2017, he renewed his contract for a further two seasons before ending the season with victories in Primeira Liga, Taça de Portugal and Supertaça, therefore, clinching Benfica's second treble in history after Lajos Baróti's in 1980–81. In addition to that, by winning two of four league titles in a row, Vitória became the first Benfica manager to reach the tetra.

The next season, Vitória won the domestic Super Cup and guided Benfica to a second place in Primeira Liga and to the worst Portuguese campaign in the Champions League, which included the club's record loss in the competition, 5–0 to Basel.

On 4 January 2019, following a string of bad results during the 2018–19 season, resulting in Benfica's first-ever loss to Portimonense, Vitória's contract was terminated by the club.

=== Al-Nassr ===
Within a week of his departure from Benfica, Vitória was hired on an 18-month contract at Saudi Arabian club Al Nassr, ranked second in the Saudi Professional League. His first match was a 5–0 win over second-tier Al-Ansar in the last 32 of the King Cup on 14 January 2019. The club from Riyadh finished the season as champions. He later led Al-Nassr to reach the 2020 AFC Champions League semi-finals, where they only lost to Persepolis on penalties.

On 27 December 2020, Vitória left the club by mutual consent. At the time of his departure, Al-Nassr were 15th in the table, with eight points from ten matches.

=== Spartak Moscow ===
On 24 May 2021, Vitória joined Russian Premier League club Spartak Moscow on a two-year contract. Zarema Salikhova, wife of then-co-owner Leonid Fedun, resigned from the board due to her disagreement with the decision.

Vitória's record at the club was mixed. He had won their Europa League group ahead of Leicester City and Napoli, for which he gained popularity amongst the fans. In fact, Spartak beat Napoli both home and away around time when Napoli was first in Serie A. However, the Russian giants were ninth in the league, with a low note being a 7–1 loss to Zenit Saint Petersburg. Vitória's contract with Spartak was terminated by mutual agreement on 15 December 2021.

=== Egypt ===
On 12 July 2022, Vitória became the manager of the Egyptian national team, signing on a four-year contract. On 4 February 2024, he was sacked from his position following the elimination from the 2023 Africa Cup of Nations round of 16, without recording any victory during the tournament.

=== Panathinaikos ===
On 31 October 2024, Vitória signed a deal to become the head coach of Greek club Panathinaikos. He was sacked on 15 September 2025.

== Managerial statistics ==
As of match played 15 August 2026

Managerial record by team and tenure
Team	Nat	From	To	Record							
Team	Nat	From	To	G	W	D	L	GF	GA	GD	Win %
Vilafranquense	(Portugal)	22 October 2002	17 May 2004	75	33	11	31	106	102	+4	44.00
Fátima	(Portugal)	10 May 2006	1 June 2010	140	63	42	35	202	143	+59	45.00
Paços Ferreira	(Portugal)	2 June 2010	30 August 2011	42	17	13	12	57	59	−2	40.48
Vitória Guimarães	(Portugal)	30 August 2011	11 June 2015	154	61	33	60	197	191	+6	39.61
Benfica	(Portugal)	11 June 2015	4 January 2019	184	125	28	31	389	162	+227	67.93
Al Nassr	(Saudi Arabia)	10 January 2019	27 December 2020	86	53	15	18	183	87	+96	61.63
Spartak Moscow	(Russia)	24 May 2021	15 December 2021	26	9	6	11	30	39	−9	34.62
Egypt	(Egypt)	12 July 2022	4 February 2024	18	12	5	1	40	13	+27	66.67
Panathinaikos	(Greece)	31 October 2024	15 September 2025	43	22	10	11	60	46	+14	51.16
Al Wasl	(United Arab Emirates)	8 February 2026	present	15	9	1	5	31	24	+7	60.00
Career totals				783	404	164	215	1,295	866	+429	51.60

== Honours ==
=== Managerial ===
Fátima

- Segunda Divisão: 2008–09

Vitória Guimarães

- Taça de Portugal: 2012–13

Benfica

- Primeira Liga: 2015–16, 2016–17
- Taça de Portugal: 2016–17
- Taça da Liga: 2015–16
- Supertaça Cândido de Oliveira: 2016, 2017

Al-Nassr

- Saudi Professional League: 2018–19
- Saudi Super Cup: 2019

=== Individual ===
- Primeira Liga – Best Coach: 2015–16, 2016–17
- Saudi Professional League Manager of the Month: March 2019, October 2019, August 2020
