= André Horta =

Portuguese footballer (born 1996)

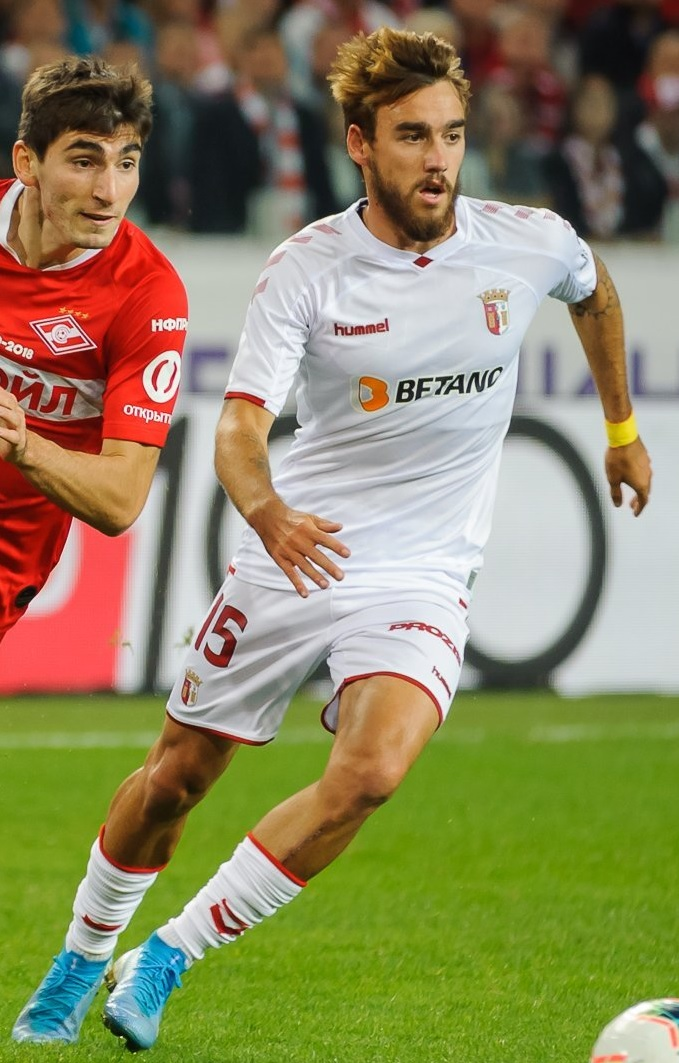
- Horta with Braga in 2019

Personal information
- Full name: André Filipe Luz Horta
- Date of birth: 7 November 1996 (age 30)
- Place of birth: Almada, Portugal
- Height: 1.74 m (5 ft 8 1/2 in)
- Position: Midfielder

Team information
- Current team: Al-Ula

Youth career
- 2004–2012: Benfica
- 2012–2015: Vitória Setúbal

Senior career*
Years	Team	Apps	(Gls)
2014–2016	Vitória Setúbal	38	(2)
2016–2018	Benfica	10	(1)
2017–2018	→ Braga (loan)	22	(1)
2018–2019	Los Angeles FC	15	(0)
2019–2026	Braga	132	(5)
2024	→ Olympiacos (loan)	12	(2)
2025	→ Olympiacos (loan)	2	(0)
2025–2026	→ Almería (loan)	19	(0)
2026–	Al-Ula	9	(4)

International career
2014	Portugal U18	4	(1)
2014–2015	Portugal U19	8	(0)
2016	Portugal U20	7	(1)
2016–2018	Portugal U21	9	(3)
- * Club domestic league appearances and goals as of 19:01, 5 November 2026 (UTC)

André Filipe Luz Horta (born 7 November 1996) is a Portuguese professional footballer who plays as a midfielder for Saudi First Division League club Al-Ula.

He made 202 Primeira Liga appearances for Vitória de Setúbal, Benfica and Braga, winning a league and cup double with the second of those teams in 2017 as well as the Taça de Portugal and Taça da Liga with the third. He also played for a year at Los Angeles FC in Major League Soccer.

== Club career ==
=== Vitória Setúbal ===
Born in Almada, Setúbal District, Horta spent eight years in Benfica's youth system, joining local Vitória at the age of 15. In late 2014, whilst still a junior, he was promoted to the first team by manager Domingos Paciência.

Horta made his first-team and Primeira Liga debut on 12 December 2014, playing the second 45 minutes of a 0–1 home loss against Boavista. He finished his first full season with 32 games – 21 starts – and two goals, helping his team narrowly avoid relegation; his goals contributed to wins at Belenenses and Tondela in December 2015.

=== Benfica ===
On 1 June 2016, Horta signed a five-year contract with defending champions Benfica. He played his first competitive match on 7 August, featuring the full 90 minutes in a 3–0 victory over Braga in the Supertaça Cândido de Oliveira. Six days later, on his league debut, he scored his only goal of 14 appearances that campaign, concluding a 2–0 win at Tondela.

Horta joined Braga on a season-long loan deal on 30 August 2017. He scored once in 22 competitive matches during his tenure, wrapping up a 3–1 away defeat of Boavista on 3 January 2018.

=== Los Angeles FC ===
Horta agreed to join Los Angeles FC on 27 March 2018, as their final Designated Player ahead of their inaugural season in Major League Soccer. The deal was made effective on 23 June that year, and he made his league debut on 27 July when he came on as a 77th-minute substitute for scorer Lee Nguyen against the LA Galaxy, his backpass nine minutes later resulting in Ola Kamara's 2–2 equaliser (final score).

=== Braga ===
On 10 June 2019, Horta returned to Portugal and Braga on a five-year deal, for a reported fee of $2.75 million and 50% of any future transfer. In his first games back at the club in August, he scored his first European goals in each leg of a 7–3 aggregate defeat of Brøndby in the third qualifying round of the UEFA Europa League. He made three appearances in the Taça da Liga for the eventual winners, scoring in the 2–1 group stage win over Marítimo.

Horta played six games as Braga won the 2020–21 Taça de Portugal, coming off the bench in four of them including the 2–0 final victory against Benfica. On 23 December, he and Abel Ruiz were sent off as the team's defence of the trophy ended with a 1–0 loss at neighbours Vizela in the last 16.

In June 2022, Horta extended his contract to 2027, with a buyout clause of €30 million. The news was announced through a video of him conducting a performance of "The Show Must Go On" at Braga's Theatre Circo.

On 20 January 2024, Horta was loaned to Super League Greece club Olympiacos until the end of the season, being reunited with his former Braga manager Carlos Carvalhal; the deal included an optional buying clause, reported to be €6 million. He made 21 appearances during his spell, including nine in the UEFA Europa Conference League which his side won. He scored his only goals on 15 May 2024, a brace in the 2–0 home victory against AEK Athens in the domestic league.

Horta was loaned again to Olympiacos in January 2025.

=== Almería ===
On 22 July 2025, Horta was announced at Spanish Segunda División side Almería also in a temporary deal, one that included an option to make the move permanent for €1,500,000 at the end of the campaign. In spite of limited playing time due to injuries, he subsequently signed a permanent three-year contract.

=== Al-Ula ===
On 17 August 2026, Horta was transferred to Al-Ula of the Saudi First Division League.

== International career ==
Horta earned 28 caps for Portugal at youth level, scoring five goals. He made his debut on 25 March 2014 in a friendly 4–2 win for the under-18 team against Belgium in Santarém, and scored his first goal in a 2–2 draw against the same opponents two days later. While he never went to a major tournament, he scored in 2019 UEFA European Under-21 Championship qualification victories over Switzerland, Wales and Bosnia and Herzegovina for his side in 2018.

== Personal life ==
Horta's older brother, Ricardo, is also a footballer. They played together at Benfica, Vitória de Setúbal and Braga.

== Career statistics ==
As of match played 17 May 2025

Appearances and goals by club, season and competition
Club	Season	League			National cup (Note: Includes Taça de Portugal, U.S. Open Cup, Greek Football Cup)		League cup (Note: Includes Taça da Liga)		Continental		Other		Total	
Club	Season	Division	Apps	Goals	Apps	Goals	Apps	Goals	Apps	Goals	Apps	Goals	Apps	Goals
Vitória Setúbal	2014–15	Primeira Liga	6	0	0	0	2	0	—		—		8	0
Vitória Setúbal	2015–16	Primeira Liga	32	2	3	0	1	0	—		—		36	2
Vitória Setúbal	Total		38	2	3	0	3	0	—		—		44	2
Benfica	2016–17	Primeira Liga	10	1	1	0	2	0	2 (Note: Appearances in UEFA Champions League)	0	1 (Note: Appearances in Supertaça Cândido de Oliveira)	0	16	1
Braga (loan)	2017–18	Primeira Liga	22	1	1	0	2	0	5 (Note: Appearances in UEFA Europa League)	0	—		30	1
Los Angeles FC	2018	Major League Soccer	11	0	1	0	—		—		—		12	0
Los Angeles FC	2019	Major League Soccer	4	0	0	0	—		—		0	0	4	0
Los Angeles FC	Total		15	0	1	0	—		—		0	0	16	0
Braga	2019–20	Primeira Liga	25	0	2	0	2	1	5	1	—		34	2
Braga	2020–21	Primeira Liga	21	1	6	0	0	0	8	0	—		35	1
Braga	2021–22	Primeira Liga	28	1	3	0	1	0	10	0	1 (Note: Appearance in Supertaça Cândido de Oliveira)	0	43	1
Braga	2022–23	Primeira Liga	32	1	7	0	4	0	7 (Note: Five appearances in UEFA Europa League, two appearances in UEFA Europa Conference League)	0	—		50	1
Braga	2023–24	Primeira Liga	14	2	3	0	2	0	6	0	—		25	2
Braga	2024–25	Primeira Liga	12	0	2	1	1	0	6	0	—		21	1
Braga	Total		132	5	23	1	10	1	42	0	1	0	208	7
Olympiacos (loan)	2023–24	Super League Greece	12	2	0	0	—		9 (Note: Appearances in UEFA Europa Conference League)	0	—		21	2
Olympiacos (loan)	2024–25	Super League Greece	2	0	3	1	—		1	0	—		6	1
Career total			231	11	32	2	17	1	60	0	2	0	341	14

== Honours ==
Benfica

- Primeira Liga: 2016–17
- Taça de Portugal: 2016–17
- Supertaça Cândido de Oliveira: 2016

Braga

- Taça de Portugal: 2020–21
- Taça da Liga: 2019–20, 2023–24

Olympiacos

- Super League Greece: 2024–25
- Greek Football Cup: 2024–25
- UEFA Conference League: 2023–24
