= Franco Cervi =

Argentine footballer (born 1994)

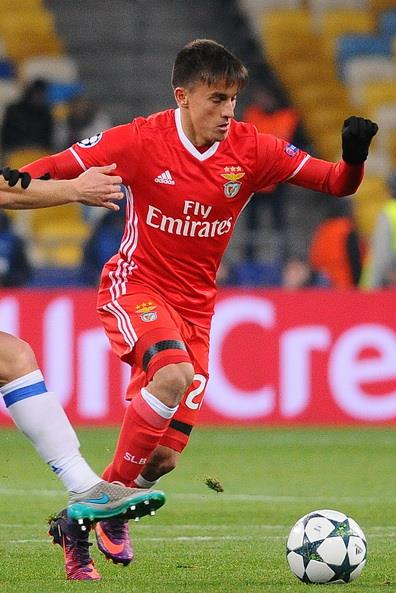
- Cervi playing for Benfica in 2016

Personal information
- Full name: Franco Emanuel Cervi
- Date of birth: 26 May 1994 (age 32)
- Place of birth: San Lorenzo, Santa Fe, Argentina
- Height: 1.65 m (5 ft 5 in)
- Positions: Left winger; left wing-back

Team information
- Current team: Rosario Central
- Number: 10

Youth career
- 2001–2014: Rosario Central

Senior career*
Years	Team	Apps	(Gls)
2014–2016	Rosario Central	42	(5)
2016–2021	Benfica	114	(11)
2021–2026	Celta	93	(4)
2026–	Rosario Central	0	(0)

International career^{‡}
2018	Argentina	4	(1)
- * Club domestic league appearances and goals as of 17:06, 26 July 2026 (UTC) ‡ National team caps and goals as of 20 November 2018

Franco Emanuel Cervi (Latin American Spanish pronunciation: [ˈfɾaŋko emaˈnwel ˈseɾβi]; 26 May 1994) is an Argentine professional footballer who plays as a left winger or left wing-back for Rosario Central.

== Club career ==
=== Rosario Central ===
A product of Rosario Central's youth system, Cervi made his league debut on 9 November 2014 against Estudiantes in a 1–0 home win. He replaced Hernán Encina after 66 minutes. On 14 February 2015, he scored his first league goal against Racing Club.

On 25 February 2016, Cervi made his debut in the Copa Libertadores against Nacional. He scored his first international goal in a 3–1 win against River Plate.

=== Benfica ===
On 15 September 2015, Cervi signed a six-year contract with Portuguese champions Benfica with a release clause of €60 million. He continued to play for Rosario Central until May 2016 and joined Benfica on 24 June for the pre-season. On his debut for Benfica, he scored the opening goal in a 3–0 win over Braga in the Supertaça Cândido de Oliveira, on 7 August 2016, and was elected best player on pitch.

On 29 December, Cervi became the first Benfica player to score in all Portuguese competitions in the same season – Supertaça, Primeira Liga, Taça de Portugal and Taça da Liga respectively. In addition, he also scored in the UEFA Champions League.

=== Celta de Vigo ===
On 5 July 2021, Cervi joined Celta de Vigo.

== International career ==
Cervi was selected in Argentina's 35-man provisional squad for the 2016 Summer Olympics in Rio de Janeiro, however he did not make the final 18-man squad for the tournament.

Cervi made his international debut for Argentina in a 3–0 friendly win over Guatemala on 8 September 2018.

== Personal life ==
Cervi, who is of Italian descent, possesses an Italian passport.

== Career statistics ==
=== Club ===
As of match played 4 December 2025

Appearances and goals by club, season and competition
Club	Season	League			National cup		League cup		Continental		Other		Total	
Club	Season	Division	Apps	Goals	Apps	Goals	Apps	Goals	Apps	Goals	Apps	Goals	Apps	Goals
Rosario Central	2014	Argentine Primera División	3	0	0	0	—		0	0	—		3	0
Rosario Central	2015	Argentine Primera División	27	5	4	0	—		0	0	—		31	5
Rosario Central	2016	Argentine Primera División	12	0	0	0	—		10	2	—		22	2
Rosario Central	Total		42	5	4	0	—		10	2	—		56	7
Benfica	2016–17	Primeira Liga	26	2	6	1	1	1	7	2	1 (Note: Appearance in the Supertaça Cândido de Oliveira)	1	41	7
Benfica	2017–18	Primeira Liga	31	3	2	1	0	0	3	0	1	0	37	4
Benfica	2018–19	Primeira Liga	20	4	2	0	2	0	14	1	—		38	5
Benfica	2019–20	Primeira Liga	16	2	5	1	0	0	6	1	0	0	27	4
Benfica	2020–21	Primeira Liga	14	0	4	1	1	0	2	0	—		21	1
Benfica	Total		107	11	19	4	4	1	32	4	2	1	164	21
Celta	2021–22	La Liga	33	4	3	2	—		—		—		36	6
Celta	2022–23	La Liga	36	0	3	1	—		—		—		39	1
Celta	2023–24	La Liga	17	0	2	0	—		—		—		19	0
Celta	2024–25	La Liga	7	0	4	0	—		—		—		11	0
Celta	2025–26	La Liga	0	0	2	0	—		1 (Note: Appearance in UEFA Europa League)	0	—		3	0
Celta	Total		93	4	14	3	—		1	0	—		108	7
Career total			243	20	38	7	4	1	43	6	2	1	325	35

=== International ===
As of 20 November 2018

Appearances and goals by national team and year
National team	Year	Apps	Goals
Argentina	2018	4	1
Total		4	1

Scores and results list Argentina's goal tally first, score column indicates score after each Cervi goal.

List of international goals scored by Franco Cervi
No.	Date	Venue	Opponent	Score	Result	Competition
1	11 October 2018	Prince Faisal bin Fahd Stadium, Riyadh, Saudi Arabia	Iraq	4–0	4–0	2018 Superclásico Championship

== Honours ==
Benfica

- Primeira Liga: 2016–17, 2018–19
- Taça de Portugal: 2016–17
- Supertaça Cândido de Oliveira: 2016, 2017

Rosario Central

- Supercopa Internacional: 2026

Individual

- 2016 Supertaça Cândido de Oliveira: Best Player
