= Paulo Lopes (footballer) =

Portuguese footballer and coach

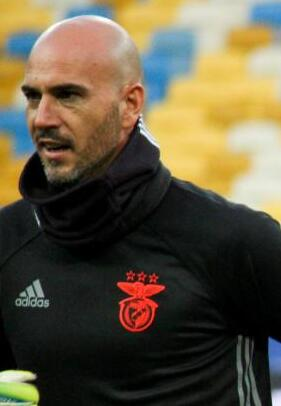
- Lopes with Benfica in 2016

Personal information
- Full name: Paulo Jorge Pedro Lopes
- Date of birth: 29 June 1978 (age 48)
- Place of birth: Mirandela, Portugal
- Height: 1.81 m (5 ft 11 in)
- Position: Goalkeeper

Youth career
- 1991–1993: Mirandela
- 1993–1997: Benfica

Senior career*
Years	Team	Apps	(Gls)
1997–2002	Benfica	0	(0)
1999–2000	→ Gil Vicente (loan)	1	(0)
2000–2001	→ Barreirense (loan)	25	(0)
2001–2002	Benfica B	26	(0)
2002–2004	Salgueiros	62	(0)
2004–2007	Estrela Amadora	33	(0)
2007–2009	Trofense	47	(0)
2009–2012	Feirense	84	(0)
2012–2018	Benfica	4	(0)
Total		282	(0)

International career
1995	Portugal U17	2	(0)
1997	Portugal U20	5	(0)
1997–2000	Portugal U21	10	(0)
2003	Portugal B	1	(0)

Managerial career
- 2023–2024: Benfica U23
- * Club domestic league appearances and goals

Paulo Jorge Pedro Lopes (born 29 June 1978) is a Portuguese former professional footballer who played as a goalkeeper.

He appeared in 81 Primeira Liga matches over 14 seasons, representing Benfica, Gil Vicente, Estrela da Amadora, Trofense and Feirense. Despite having made only 11 appearances for Benfica, he won seven trophies with the club always as third-choice.

Lopes added 150 games in the Segunda Liga in a 21-year senior career.

== Playing career ==
Born in Mirandela, Bragança District, Lopes joined S.L. Benfica's youth system at the age of 15, being promoted to the first team four years later and going on to serve two loans in his first two years as a senior. On 19 February 2000, while at the service of Gil Vicente FC, he made his Primeira Liga debut, coming on as a second-half substitute in an eventual 1–1 away draw against Sporting CP after Paulo Jorge was sent off.

In June 2002, Lopes was released by Benfica. He alternated between the main division and the Segunda Liga the following decade, notably achieving top-tier promotions with C.D. Trofense (2007–08) and C.D. Feirense (2010–11); during his stint with the former, on 4 January 2009, he was on goal to help the hosts defeat his parent club 2–0, in a relegation-ending season.

Lopes returned to the Estádio da Luz in the summer of 2012, aged 34. He went on to act as third goalkeeper under several managers, collecting three league winners' medals by appearing in matches after his team had already been crowned champions; he made his competitive debut on 18 October 2012, in a 4–0 away win over S.C. Freamunde in the third round of the Taça de Portugal.

== Coaching career ==
Lopes retired at the end of the 2017–18 campaign, being immediately appointed goalkeeper coach of Benfica's newly created under-23 team. On 16 January 2019, in the same capacity, he joined the reserve side.

On 6 July 2023, Lopes became the new manager of Benfica's under-23.

== Personal life ==
Lopes' son, André, was also a footballer.

== Honours ==
Trofense

- Segunda Liga: 2007–08

Benfica

- Primeira Liga: 2013–14, 2015–16, 2016–17
- Taça da Liga: 2013–14
- Supertaça Cândido de Oliveira: 2014, 2016, 2017

Individual

- Segunda Liga Goalkeeper of the Year: 2010–11
