= Tiago Almeida (footballer, born 1990) =

Cape Verdean footballer (born 1990)

Personal information
- Full name: Tiago Miguel Monteiro de Almeida
- Date of birth: 13 September 1990 (age 36)
- Place of birth: Lisbon, Portugal
- Height: 1.80 m (5 ft 11 in)
- Position: Right back

Youth career
- 2006–2007: Casa Pia
- 2007–2009: Belenenses

Senior career*
Years	Team	Apps	(Gls)
2009–2016	Belenenses	8	(0)
2009–2010	→ Mafra (loan)	20	(2)
2011	→ Tourizense (loan)	15	(4)
2012	→ Pinhalnovense (loan)	14	(8)
2012–2014	→ Vitória S.C. (loan)	55	(2)
2014–2015	→ Académico Viseu (loan)	40	(7)
2015–2016	→ Chaves (loan)	22	(0)
2016-2017	Moreirense	11	(0)
2017-2018	Politehnica Iași	11	(0)
2018	União Madeira	14	(1)
2018–2020	Académico de Viseu	42	(0)
2020	Hermannstadt	14	(1)
2020–2021	Feirense	2	(0)
2021	→ Varzim (loan)	11	(0)
2022	Sūduva	15	(1)

International career^{‡}
2006	Portugal U17	1	(0)
2007–2008	Portugal U18	6	(0)
2015–	Cape Verde	15	(0)
- * Club domestic league appearances and goals as of 23 November 2022 ‡ National team caps and goals as of 28 May 2022

Tiago Miguel Monteiro de Almeida (born 13 September 1990) is a Cape Verdean professional footballer who plays as a right back for Sūduva in A Lyga.

== Honours ==
Moreirense

- Taça da Liga winner: 2016–17.
