= Lenda Vumbi =

French footballer (born 1995)

Personal information
- Full name: Lenda Belly Vumbi Bundu
- Date of birth: 12 November 1995 (age 30)
- Place of birth: Aubervilliers, France
- Height: 1.75 m (5 ft 9 in)
- Position: Left back

Team information
- Current team: Stade Nyonnais
- Number: 24

Youth career
- 2002–2009: US Chambray-lès-Tours
- 2009–2013: Tours

Senior career*
Years	Team	Apps	(Gls)
2013–2015	Tours	2	(0)
2013–2015	Tours B	36	(1)
2015–2016	Académico de Viseu	2	(0)
2016	→ Felgueiras 1932 (loan)	12	(1)
2016–2018	Leixões	26	(2)
2018–2019	Virton	4	(0)
2019–2020	Yverdon-Sport	3	(0)
2020–2022	Stade Lausanne Ouchy	0	(0)
2020–2022	→ Stade Nyonnais (loan)	48	(3)
2022–	Stade Nyonnais	34	(4)

International career
2013	France U18	1	(0)
2013	France U19	2	(0)
- * Club domestic league appearances and goals as of 1 July 2025

Lenda Belly Vumbi Bundu (born 13 July 1995) is a French footballer who currently plays for Swiss club Stade Nyonnais.

== Career ==
Vumbi is a youth exponent from Tours FC. He plays as left back. He made his Ligue 2 debut on the opening game of the 2013–14 season on 2 August 2013 against Clermont Foot replacing Billy Ketkeophomphone after 68 minutes in a 2–1 away loss. Four days later, he played in the Coupe de la Ligue against Istres.

In August 2019, Vumbi joined Swiss club Yverdon-Sport FC.
