= André Lopes (footballer) =

Portuguese association football player

Personal information
- Full name: André Filipe Sousa Dias Pedro Lopes
- Date of birth: 2 November 2001 (age 25)
- Place of birth: Portugal
- Height: 1.84 m (6 ft 0 in)
- Position: Left-back

Team information
- Current team: Feirense
- Number: 16

Youth career
- 2010–2014: Académica
- 2014–2017: Sacavenense
- 2017–2019: Cova da Piedade
- 2019–2020: Belenenses

Senior career*
Years	Team	Apps	(Gls)
2020–2021	B-SAD B	1	(0)
2021–2022	B-SAD	1	(0)
2022–2024	Mafra	20	(0)
2024–2025	Porto B	8	(0)
2025–2026	FC Zlín	0	(0)
2025–2026	FC Zlín B	7	(0)
2026–	Feirense	16	(0)
- * Club domestic league appearances and goals as of 19 June 2026

André Filipe Sousa Dias Pedro Lopes (born 2 November 2001), known as just André Lopes, is a Portuguese professional footballer who plays as a left-back for Liga Portugal 2 club Feirense.

== Club career ==
On 27 November 2021, as a COVID-hit Belenenses were forced to name a team of just nine players for the Primeira Liga home game against Benfica, João Monteiro made his professional debut, starting the game as a left-back. The encounter led to a 7–0 lead for Benfica at half time, before the game was eventually stopped during the break, as João Monteiro was injured.

On 1 August 2022, Lopes signed with Mafra, where he was assigned to the Under-23 squad. He was first called up to Mafra's senior squad for the game against Nacional on 13 February 2023.

On 24 October 2024, Lopes joined Liga Portugal 2 side Porto B, signing a one-year contract.

On 16 June 2025, Lopes moved to the Czech Republic, joining recently-promoted to Czech First League club FC Zlín.

On 15 January 2026, after struggling for game-time at Zlín, Lopes returned to Portugal, joining second-division side Feirense.

== Personal life ==
Lopes is the son of the retired Portuguese football goalkeeper Paulo Lopes.
