= 2016 Supertaça Cândido de Oliveira =

- Event: Supertaça Cândido de Oliveira (Portuguese Super Cup)
Benfica	Braga
3	0
- Date: 7 August 2016
- Venue: Estádio Municipal de Aveiro, Aveiro
- Man of the Match: Franco Cervi (Benfica)
- Referee: João Capela (Lisbon)
- Attendance: 28,796

The 2016 Supertaça Cândido de Oliveira was the 38th edition of the Supertaça Cândido de Oliveira. It took place on 7 August 2016, and it featured the champions of the 2015–16 Primeira Liga, Benfica, and the winners of the 2015–16 Taça de Portugal, Braga.

== Background ==
Benfica made their 18th Supertaça appearance. Their last appearance had been in 2015, where they lost 1–0 to Sporting CP at the Estádio Algarve. Benfica had won five Supertaças, in 1980, 1985, 1989, 2005 and 2014.

Braga played in the fixture for the third time. Their last presence had been in 1998 where they lost 2–1 on aggregate against Porto. Braga had not won any edition, being runners-up in 1982 and 1998.

== Pre-match ==
=== Entry ===
Benfica qualified for their third consecutive Supertaça Cândido de Oliveira by winning the league title. On the last matchday, Benfica won 4–1 against Nacional at Estádio da Luz to clinch the Primeira Liga for the 35th time.

Braga qualified by winning the cup final, beating Porto 4–2 on penalties, after a 2–2 draw. This was Braga's second Taça de Portugal triumph.

=== Broadcasting ===
The final was broadcast by TVI.

== Match ==
=== Details ===
7 August 2016
20:45 WEST (UTC+01:00)

Benfica	3–0	Braga
Cervi 10'; Jonas 75'; Pizzi 90+2'

Estádio Municipal de Aveiro, Aveiro
Attendance: 28,796
Referee: João Capela (Lisbon)

Benfica	Braga

GK	12	(Brazil) Júlio César
RB	50	(Portugal) Nélson Semedo	(yellow card) 31'
CB	4	(Brazil) Luisão (c)
CB	14	(Sweden) Victor Lindelöf
LB	3	(Spain) Álex Grimaldo	(yellow card) 53'
CM	5	(Serbia) Ljubomir Fejsa
CM	8	(Portugal) André Horta
RW	21	(Portugal) Pizzi
LW	22	(Argentina) Franco Cervi		(substituted off) 86'
CF	11	(Greece) Kostas Mitroglou		(substituted off) 68'
CF	10	(Brazil) Jonas		(substituted off) 78'
Substitutes:
GK	13	(Portugal) Paulo Lopes
DF	2	(Argentina) Lisandro López
MF	7	(Greece) Andreas Samaris		(substituted in) 78'
MF	15	(Peru) André Carrillo
MF	18	(Argentina) Eduardo Salvio		(substituted in) 86'
FW	9	(Mexico) Raúl Jiménez		(substituted in) 68'
FW	20	(Portugal) Gonçalo Guedes
Manager:
(Portugal) Rui Vitória

GK	28	(Portugal) José Marafona
RB	15	(Brazil) Baiano
CB	5	(France) Willy Boly	(yellow card) 72'
CB	6	(Portugal) André Pinto (c)
LB	87	(Brazil) Marcelo Goiano	(yellow card) 6'
CM	35	(Montenegro) Nikola Vukčević
CM	63	(Brazil) Mauro
CM	25	(Portugal) Pedro Tiba		(substituted off) 65'
RW	23	(Portugal) Pedro Santos		(substituted off) 88'
LW	18	(Portugal) Rafa Silva
CF	19	(Serbia) Nikola Stojiljković		(substituted off) 68'
Substitutes:
GK	92	(Brazil) Matheus
DF	3	(Serbia) Lazar Rosić
DF	16	(Brazil) Djavan		(substituted in) 88'
MF	7	(Portugal) Wilson Eduardo		(substituted in) 65'
MF	8	(Montenegro) Marko Bakić
FW	9	(Egypt) Ahmed Hassan		(substituted in) 68'
FW	30	(Brazil) Alan
Manager:
(Portugal) José Peseiro

Man of the Match:
(Argentina) Franco Cervi (Benfica)

Assistant referees:
Álvaro Mesquita (Vila Real)
Pedro Mota (Lisbon)
Fourth official:
Pedro Ribeiro (Aveiro)
Additional assistant referees:
Tiago Martins (Lisbon)
Fábio Veríssimo (Leiria)

Match rules

- 90 minutes.
- 30 minutes of extra time if necessary.
- Penalty shoot-out if scores still level.
- Seven named substitutes, of which up to three may be used.

=== Statistics ===
First half
	Benfica	Braga
Goals scored	1	0
Total shots	5	5
Shots on target	2	3
Ball possession	52%	48%
Corner kicks	1	1
Fouls committed	8	7
Offsides	0	2
Yellow cards	1	1
Red cards	0	0

Second half
	Benfica	Braga
Goals scored	2	0
Total shots	4	7
Shots on target	3	3
Ball possession	58%	42%
Corner kicks	0	3
Fouls committed	11	10
Offsides	1	2
Yellow cards	1	0
Red cards	0	0

Overall
	Benfica	Braga
Goals scored	3	0
Total shots	9	12
Shots on target	5	7
Ball possession	58%	42%
Corner kicks	1	4
Fouls committed	19	17
Offsides	1	4
Yellow cards	2	1
Red cards	0	0

== See also ==
- 2016–17 Primeira Liga
- 2016–17 Taça de Portugal
- 2016–17 Taça da Liga
- 2016–17 S.L. Benfica season
