= Mohcine Nader =

Portuguese footballer

Personal information
- Full name: Mohcine Hassan Nader
- Date of birth: 30 September 1994 (age 32)
- Place of birth: Faro, Portugal
- Height: 1.83 m (6 ft 0 in)
- Position: Forward

Team information
- Current team: Deltras
- Number: 10

Youth career
- 2004–2012: Internacional Almancil
- 2012–2013: Vitória Setúbal

Senior career*
Years	Team	Apps	(Gls)
2013–2018	Vitória Setúbal	13	(1)
2013–2014	→ Casa Pia (loan)	24	(2)
2014–2015	→ Pinhalnovense (loan)	26	(9)
2016–2017	→ Freamunde (loan)	25	(0)
2017–2018	→ Olhanense (loan)	17	(2)
2018–2020	Olhanense	55	(21)
2020–2022	Dudelange	42	(10)
2022–2023	Alverca	26	(4)
2023–2024	Persita Tangerang	12	(2)
2024–2025	Anadia	4	(0)
2025–2026	PSBS Biak	23	(4)
2026–	Deltras	3	(1)
- * Club domestic league appearances and goals as of 4 October 2026

Mohcine Hassan Nader (born 30 September 1994) is a Portuguese professional footballer who plays as a forward for Championship club Deltras.

== Club career ==
Born in Faro, Algarve, where his Moroccan international father Hassan Nader played in the same position for S.C. Farense, Nader finished his development at Vitória F.C. and spent his first two years as a senior in third division, on loan at Casa Pia A.C. and C.D. Pinhalnovense. He made his professional debut in the Primeira Liga for the Setúbal-based club on 25 October 2015, coming on as a late substitute for André Claro in a 2–0 away win against Moreirense FC, and totalled 13 appearances over the season; on his first start, the following 22 January, he scored the opening goal of a 2–1 home victory over Académica de Coimbra.

Days after his first goal, Setúbal enacted the extension clause in Nader's contract, tying him to the club until June 2018. In August 2016, he was loaned to LigaPro team S.C. Freamunde for the upcoming campaign. The following year, he joined Campeonato de Portugal side S.C. Olhanense also on loan; the move was made permanent in the summer of 2018.

On 4 August 2022, after two seasons at F91 Dudelange in the Luxembourg National Division, being crowned champion in 2021–22, Nader returned to the Portuguese third tier at F.C. Alverca in Liga 3.

== Honours ==
Dudelange

- Luxembourg National Division: 2021–22
