= Lisandro López (footballer, born 1989) =

Argentine footballer

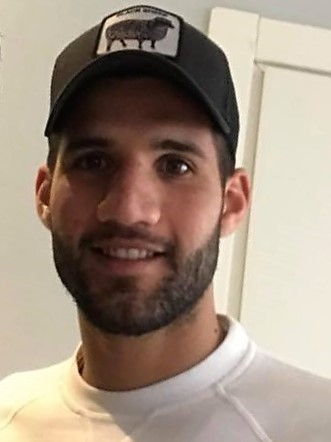
- López in 2018

Personal information
- Full name: Lisandro Ezequiel López
- Date of birth: 1 September 1989 (age 37)
- Place of birth: Villa Constitución, Argentina
- Height: 1.88 m (6 ft 2 in)
- Position: Centre back

Team information
- Current team: Belgrano
- Number: 17

Senior career*
Years	Team	Apps	(Gls)
2009–2010	Chacarita Juniors	24	(2)
2010–2013	Arsenal de Sarandí	119	(17)
2013–2019	Benfica	54	(6)
2013–2014	→ Getafe (loan)	28	(4)
2018	→ Inter Milan (loan)	1	(0)
2018–2019	→ Genoa (loan)	0	(0)
2019	→ Boca Juniors (loan)	8	(2)
2019–2021	Boca Juniors	27	(3)
2022–2023	Tijuana	27	(7)
2023–2024	Al-Khaleej	31	(2)
2024–2025	Burgos	10	(1)
2025	Olimpia	15	(2)
2025–	Belgrano	27	(0)

International career^{‡}
2011–2012	Argentina	4	(0)
- * Club domestic league appearances and goals as of 17:48, 9 July 2026 (UTC) ‡ National team caps and goals as of 6 March 2014

Lisandro Ezequiel López (born 1 September 1989) is an Argentine professional footballer who plays as a defender for Belgrano. He has also appeared for the Argentina national team.

== Club career ==
López made his official debut with Chacarita Juniors on 22 August 2009 in a loss against CA Tigre, amounting 24 games in 2009–10 Argentine Primera División.

In July 2010, López joined Arsenal de Sarandí on a free transfer, where he established himself as a centre back, helping the team win the 2012 Clausura. His performances drew attention from European clubs such as Arsenal, A.C. Milan, Málaga CF, and Benfica, in the latter side as a potential replacement for his fellow countryman Ezequiel Garay.

On 10 July 2013, López signed with Portuguese club Benfica on a five-year deal and with a €35 million buy-out clause, being initially loaned for one year to La Liga side Getafe CF. In 2014–15, he was guaranteed a place in Benfica and made his debut on 5 October 2014 in a 4–0 home win over Arouca in Primeira Liga.

On 15 January 2018, Lopez moved to Italian side Inter Milan on a six-month loan with the option to buy. Later, on 5 August that year, he was loaned out to another Serie A club, Genoa, until 30 June 2019. The loan, however, was terminated in January 2019.

On 30 January 2019, López joined Boca Juniors on a loan deal until 31 December. On 1 November, Benfica announced that he had been transferred permanently to the Argentinian side for €2.70m.

On 24 February 2022, López signed with Liga MX club Tijuana. On 6 July 2023, he signed with Saudi Professional League club Al-Khaleej.

On 27 August 2024, López joined Spanish Segunda División side Burgos CF. The following 6 January, he terminated his link.

On 2 July 2025, López signed with Liga Profesional club Belgrano.

== Career statistics ==
=== Club ===
As of 31 January 2019

Club	Season	League		Cup		League Cup		Continental		Other (Note: Includes the Supercopa Argentina and Supertaça Cândido de Oliveira)		Total	
Club	Season	Apps	Goals	Apps	Goals	Apps	Goals	Apps	Goals	Apps	Goals	Apps	Goals
Chacarita Juniors	2008–09	1	0	—		—		—		—		1	0
Chacarita Juniors	2009–10	24	2	—		—		—		—		24	2
Chacarita Juniors	Total	25	2	—		—		—		—		25	2
Arsenal de Sarandí	2010–11	37	6	—		—		5	0	—		42	6
Arsenal de Sarandí	2011–12	31	4	0	0	—		5	0	—		36	4
Arsenal de Sarandí	2012–13	34	7	4	0	—		6	0	1	0	45	7
Arsenal de Sarandí	Total	102	17	4	0	—		16	0	1	0	123	17
Benfica	2014–15	6	0	1	0	1	0	2	0	0	0	10	0
Benfica	2015–16	14	1	0	0	2	0	2	0	1	0	19	1
Benfica	2016–17	8	3	4	0	3	1	2	0	0	0	17	4
Benfica	2017–18	4	0	0	0	2	1	2	0	0	0	8	1
Benfica	Total	32	4	5	0	8	2	8	0	1	0	54	6
Getafe (loan)	2013–14	26	3	2	1	—		—		—		28	4
Inter Milan (loan)	2017–18	1	0	0	0	—		—		—		1	0
Genoa (loan)	2018–19	0	0	1	0	—		—		—		1	0
Career Total		186	26	12	1	8	2	24	0	2	0	232	29

=== International ===
National team	Year	Apps	Goals
Argentina	2011	2	0
Argentina	2012	2	0
Total		4	0

== Honours ==
Arsenal de Sarandí

- Primera División: 2012 Clausura
- Supercopa Argentina: 2012

Benfica

- Primeira Liga: 2014–15, 2015–16, 2016–17
- Taça de Portugal: 2016–17
- Taça da Liga: 2014–15, 2015–16
- Supertaça Cândido de Oliveira: 2016, 2017

Boca Juniors

- Primera División: 2019–20
- Copa Argentina: 2019–20
- Copa de la Liga Profesional: 2020
- Supercopa Argentina: 2018

Belgrano

- Primera División: 2026 Apertura

Individual

- Liga MX All-Star: 2022
