= Vasco Costa =

Portuguese footballer

Personal information
- Full name: Vasco António Barbosa da Costa
- Date of birth: 8 August 1991 (age 35)
- Place of birth: Ponte de Lima, Portugal
- Height: 1.84 m (6 ft 0 in)
- Position: Forward

Youth career
- 2001–2003: Limianos
- 2003–2004: Vitorino das Donas
- 2004–2005: Limianos
- 2005–2006: Escola Luciano Sousa
- 2006–2010: Limianos

Senior career*
Years	Team	Apps	(Gls)
2010–2014	Limianos	118	(21)
2014–2015	Fafe	31	(12)
2015–2017	Vitória Setúbal	29	(3)
2018	Famalicão	17	(0)
2018–2021	São Martinho	73	(21)
2021–2025	Limianos	77	(17)
Total		345	(74)
- * Club domestic league appearances and goals

Vasco António Barbosa da Costa (born 8 August 1991 in Ponte de Lima, Viana do Castelo District) is a Portuguese former professional footballer who played as a forward.
