= Ruca (footballer, born September 1990) =

Portuguese footballer

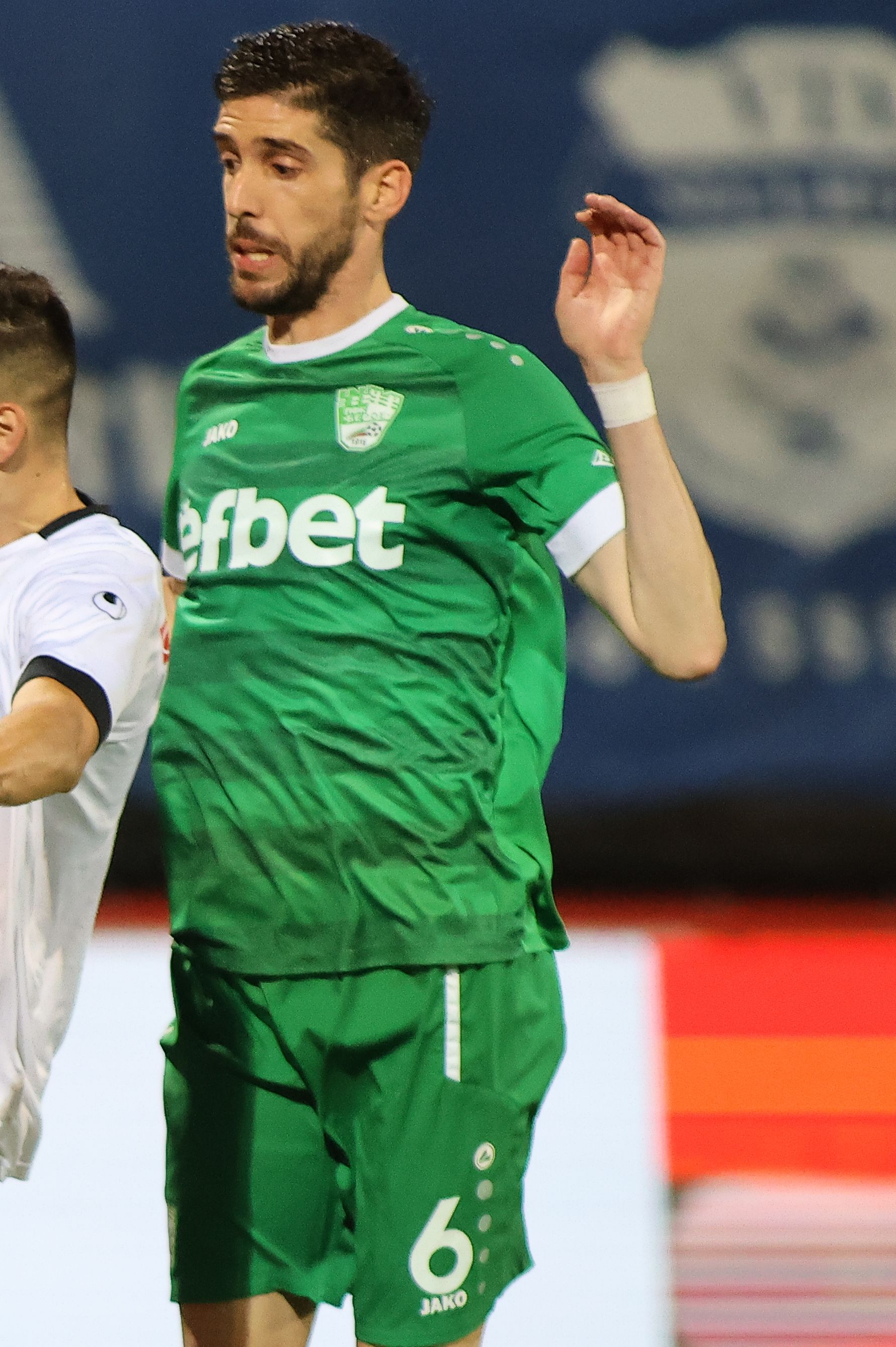
- Ruca with Beroe in 2022

Personal information
- Full name: Rui Pedro Coimbra Chaves
- Date of birth: 11 September 1990 (age 36)
- Place of birth: Tondela, Portugal
- Height: 1.89 m (6 ft 2 1/2 in)
- Position: Left-back

Youth career
- 1999–2000: São Miguel Outeiro
- 2000–2002: Molelos
- 2002–2007: Repesenses
- 2007–2009: Beira-Mar

Senior career*
Years	Team	Apps	(Gls)
2009–2014	Gil Vicente	0	(0)
2009–2010	→ Tondela (loan)	16	(3)
2010	→ Vilaverdense (loan)	15	(0)
2011	→ Oliveira Frades (loan)	19	(7)
2011–2012	→ Tondela (loan)	7	(0)
2012–2013	→ Oliveira Frades (loan)	31	(17)
2013–2014	→ Mirandela (loan)	28	(2)
2014–2015	Mafra	29	(7)
2015–2016	Vitória Setúbal	25	(1)
2017–2018	Tondela	8	(0)
2018	→ Alki Oroklini (loan)	13	(1)
2018–2019	Mafra	28	(4)
2019–2021	Feirense	39	(0)
2021–2022	Penafiel	20	(0)
2022–2023	Beroe	15	(0)
2023	Académica	5	(0)
2023–2025	São João Ver	53	(4)
2025–2026	Anadia	25	(2)
Total		376	(48)
- * Club domestic league appearances and goals

Rui Pedro Coimbra Chaves (born 11 September 1990), known as Ruca, is a Portuguese former professional footballer who played as a left-back.

== Club career ==
Born in Tondela, Viseu District, Ruca moved to S.C. Beira-Mar's youth system at the age of 16 from local Clube de Futebol Repesenses. After winning the second-division juniors championship in 2009, he signed with Gil Vicente FC.

In his first season as a senior, Ruca was loaned to hometown's C.D. Tondela. He made his competitive debut against Amarante F.C. on 30 August 2009, in a match for the Taça de Portugal. He continued to be loaned the following years, to Vilaverdense FC, Oliveira de Frades (two spells) and again Tondela.

Ruca joined yet another club in the third division in the summer of 2013, SC Mirandela. He had been previously deployed as a left winger or attacking midfielder, but switched to left-back at his new team.

On 1 July 2014, Ruca signed for C.D. Mafra as a free agent after his contract with Gil expired. Starting in all his league appearances, he contributed seven goals to help the side win the championship and subsequently promote to the Segunda Liga.

Ruca agreed to a two-year deal with Vitória F.C. from the Primeira Liga, on 11 June 2015. He scored on his debut in the competition on 16 August, putting the hosts ahead 2–0 in an eventual 2–2 draw against Boavista FC.

On 30 August 2016, Ruca was linked to Cypriot club Apollon Limassol FC, but Vitória manager José Couceiro vetoed his departure due to lack of options in his position. On 30 December he left by mutual consent due to lack of playing time and, two days later, returned to Tondela.

Ruca continued to compete in the Portuguese second tier in the following seasons (a brief loan spell in the Cypriot First Division notwithstanding), representing Mafra, C.D. Feirense and F.C. Penafiel. He moved abroad again in July 2022, joining PFC Beroe Stara Zagora of the First Professional Football League (Bulgaria).

Ruca subsequently returned to Portugal, representing in the lower leagues Académica de Coimbra and SC São João de Ver.

== Career statistics ==
As of match played 25 May 2024

Appearances and goals by club, season and competition
Club	Season	League			National cup		League cup		Total	
Club	Season	Division	Apps	Goals	Apps	Goals	Apps	Goals	Apps	Goals
Gil Vicente	2009–10	Liga de Honra	0	0	0	0	0	0	0	0
Tondela (loan)	2009–10	Segunda Divisão	16	3	1	0	—		17	3
Vilaverdense (loan)	2010–11	AF Braga Divisão de Honra	15	0	0	0	—		15	0
Oliveira Frades (loan)	2010–11	Terceira Divisão	19	7	0	0	—		19	7
Tondela (loan)	2011–12	Segunda Divisão	7	0	2	1	—		9	1
Oliveira Frades (loan)	2012–13	Terceira Divisão	31	17	0	0	—		31	17
Mirandela (loan)	2013–14	Campeonato de Portugal	28	2	0	0	—		28	2
Mafra	2014–15	Campeonato de Portugal	29	7	2	0	—		31	7
Vitória Setúbal	2015–16	Primeira Liga	24	1	3	0	1	0	28	1
Vitória Setúbal	2016–17	Primeira Liga	1	0	0	0	2	0	3	0
Vitória Setúbal	Total		25	1	3	0	3	0	31	1
Tondela	2016–17	Primeira Liga	8	0	0	0	0	0	8	0
Alki Oroklini (loan)	2017–18	Cypriot First Division	13	1	0	0	—		13	1
Mafra	2018–19	LigaPro	28	4	1	0	2	0	31	4
Feirense	2019–20	LigaPro	17	0	2	0	1	0	20	0
Feirense	2020–21	Liga Portugal 2	22	0	2	0	—		24	0
Feirense	Total		39	0	4	0	1	0	44	0
Penafiel	2021–22	Liga Portugal 2	20	0	3	1	2	0	25	1
Beroe	2022–23	First Professional Football League	15	0	2	0	—		17	0
Académica	2022–23	Liga 3	5	0	0	0	—		5	0
São João Ver	2023–24	Campeonato de Portugal	26	1	0	0	—		26	1
Career totals			324	43	18	2	8	0	350	45

== Honours ==
Vilaverdense

- Braga Football Association: 2010–11

Mafra

- Campeonato de Portugal: 2014–15
