= 2014–15 S.L. Benfica season =

Benfica
2014–15 season
- President: Luís Filipe Vieira
- Head coach: Jorge Jesus
- Stadium: Estádio da Luz
- Primeira Liga: 1st
- Taça de Portugal: Fifth round
- Taça da Liga: Winners
- Supertaça Cândido de Oliveira: Winners
- UEFA Champions League: Group stage
- Top goalscorer: League: Jonas (20 goals); All: Jonas (31 goals)
- Highest home attendance: 63,534 v Porto (26 April 2015)
- Lowest home attendance: 11,955 v Arouca (14 January 2015)
- Average home league attendance: 48,520
- Biggest win: Benfica 6–0 Estoril (28 February 2015)
- Biggest defeat: Benfica 0–2 Zenit Saint Petersburg (16 September 2014); Bayer Leverkusen 3–1 Benfica (1 October 2014)
Home colours	Away colours

The 2014–15 season was Sport Lisboa e Benfica's 111th season in existence and the club's 81st consecutive season in the top flight of Portuguese football.

Benfica won their second consecutive and record-extending 34th overall Primeira Liga title, their second consecutive and sixth overall Taça da Liga, and their fifth Supertaça Cândido de Oliveira.

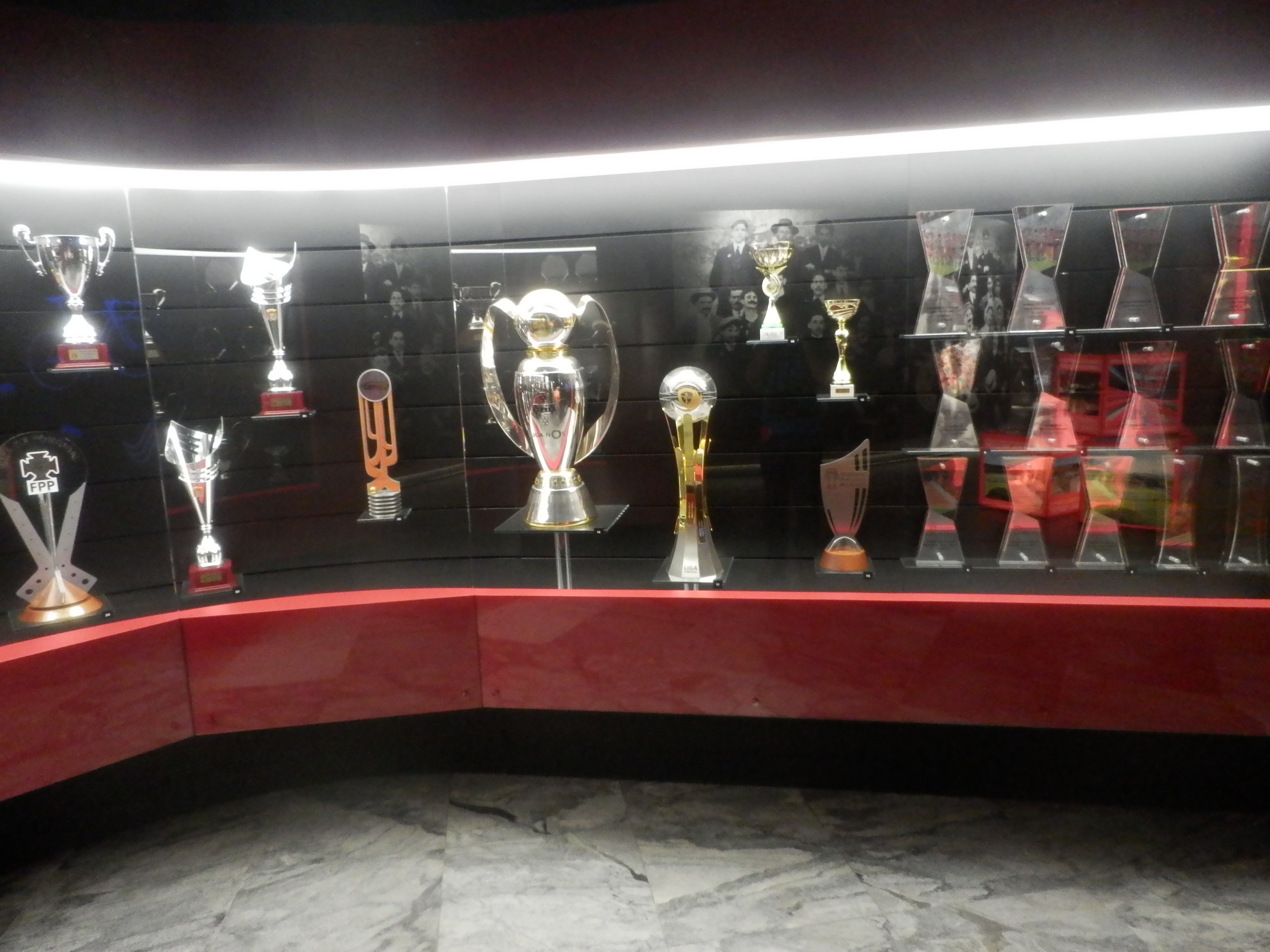
Benfica's 2014–15 trophies

== Season overview ==
=== July ===
In the 111th season, manager Jorge Jesus started his sixth consecutive season at Benfica, for the first time in the last 60 years, since János Biri. The president Luís Filipe Vieira started his eleventh consecutive season.

After winning an historic treble, Benfica lost many players of its starting XI. Nemanja Matić had moved to Chelsea on 15 January 2014. Guilherme Siqueira had returned to Granada in June. On 25 June, Ezequiel Garay had moved to Zenit Saint Petersburg. Rodrigo and André Gomes' economic rights had been sold to an investment firm on 31 January; in July, they moved to Valencia on loan. On 15 July, Lazar Marković moved to Liverpool. The next day, Jan Oblak moved to Atlético Madrid.

=== August ===
On 4 August, after seven seasons, Benfica's ninth all-time top scorer, Óscar Cardozo, moved to Trabzonspor.

On 10 August, Benfica won its fifth Supercup, beating Rio Ave 3–2 on penalties after a goalless draw. A severely remodeled squad, only presented seven starters of the Taça de Portugal final played just two months earlier: Luisão, Maxi Pereira, Ruben Amorim, Eduardo Salvio, Enzo Pérez, Nicolás Gaitán and Lima. The new players Talisca, Derley, Eliseu and Bebé made their official debut for Benfica. Benfica dominated throughout the match but was unable to score on multiple occasions, finally beating Rio Ave on penalties, after Artur defended three of them. It was the first time since 2010 that Benfica played the Supercup, winning a previous one in 2005. With this conquest, Benfica became the only Portuguese club to have won all four domestic titles in a year.

On 17 August, in the league's first day, Benfica beat Paços de Ferreira (2–0) with goals from Maxi Pereira and Salvio, with Artur saving a penalty in the 10th minute. Additionally, Benfica won the first matchday ten years later; the first with Jorge Jesus and the second during the ten-year term of Luís Filipe Vieira. On 19 August, Júlio César joined Benfica. On 22 August, Benfica signed Andreas Samaris. On 24 August, Benfica won at Boavista with a strike by Eliseu from 25 meters out. During the match, played in an artificial turf, Ruben Amorim got severely injured, with news in next day reporting an anterior cruciate ligament injury. On 31 August, Benfica drew against Sporting CP (1–1). Nicolás Gaitán scored the first goal, while Artur made a mistake which allowed Islam Slimani to tie the match. It was the first league goal for Sporting at the Estádio da Luz since 29 April 2007. It was also the first time in seven seasons that Sporting made any points in a league match against Benfica, while playing as a visitor at the Lisbon derby.

=== September ===
On 1 September, Benfica signed Bryan Cristante and extended Sílvio's loan. On 11 September, Benfica signed Jonas. On 12 September, after the early break for the Euro 2016 qualifying, Benfica returned with a 0–5 win at Vitória de Setúbal, with a hat-trick from Talisca, in his first goals in the Primeira Liga. Furthermore, Samaris and Cristante made their debuts for Benfica, while Ola John scored his first goal in the league. On 16 September, in the first matchday of the Champions League, Benfica lost 0–2 to Zenit. Hulk scored, Artur was sent off for a foul on Danny outside of the box, and former Benfica player Witsel scored the second goal. It was Benfica's first home defeat in 51 matches, and the first home defeat in the Champions League since 2 October 2012. On 21 September, Benfica struggled to defeat Moreirense, suffering an early goal from João Pedro in the debut of Júlio César. In the second half, after Marcelo Oliveira was sent off for tackling Talisca, Eliseu scored from 30 meters out; eight minutes later Maxi Pereira untied the match; and in the final minutes Lima scored from penalty kick after being tackled in the box. On 27 September, Benfica won at Estoril (2–3) with two goals from Talisca and one from Lima. Winning 0–2, the Eagles allowed Estoril to tie the match, with goals from Diogo Amado and Kléber, but in an individual effort from Derley, Lima scored the winning goal.

=== October ===
On 1 October, Benfica lost at Bayer Leverkusen (3–1) and remained point-less in the Champions League group stage. Nonetheless, four days later Benfica won 4–0 against Arouca, in the debut of Lisandro López, Jonas and Pizzi, maintaining the lead in Portuguese league. On 18 October, Benfica defeated Covilhã (2–3) with a hat-trick from Jonas in the third round of Taça de Portugal. On 22 October, Benfica drew at Monaco (0–0) and achieved their first point in the Champions League. On 26 October, Benfica lost for the first time in the league, (1–2) at Braga, but kept the first position. On 31 October, Benfica beat Rio Ave (1–0) with a goal from Talisca, who scored his fourth consecutive goal in the Primeira Liga.

=== November ===
On 4 November, Benfica beat Monaco with a goal from Talisca and secured the first victory in group stage of Champions League. On 9 November, Benfica won at Nacional (1–2), with goals from Salvio and Jonas, and maintained the lead of Primeira Liga. On 22 November, Benfica advanced to the fifth round of the Taça de Portugal by beating Moreirense (4–1), with Jonas and Salvio scoring two goals each. On 26 November, Benfica lost at Zenit (1–0) and were eliminated from European competitions following the Monaco win at Leverkusen. On 30 November, Benfica won at Académica (0–2) with goals from Nicolás Gaitán and Luisão, and kept the first place in the Portuguese league.

=== December ===
On 6 December, Benfica continued leading the Portuguese league by defeating Belenenses (3–0) with goals from Lima, Pérez, and Salvio. On 9 December, Benfica draw with Bayer Leverkusen (0–0). On 14 December, Benfica defeated Porto at the Estádio do Dragão (0–2) with two goals from Lima, securing the first place in Primeira Liga with six more points than the second-placed Porto. On 18 December, Benfica was eliminated from Taça de Portugal by Braga (1–2). On 21 December, Benfica beat Gil Vicente (1–0) in Primeira Liga with a goal from Nicolás Gaitán. On 30 December, Benfica beat Nacional (1–0) with a header from Jonas in the third round of Taça da Liga, their last match of 2014. Miralem Sulejmani returned after suffering an injury in May 2014.

=== January ===
On 1 January, Nélson Oliveira moved to Swansea City on loan. On 2 January, Enzo Pérez moved to Valencia. On 4 January, Benfica beat Penafiel (0–3) with goals from Talisca, Jonas and Jardel, achieving seven consecutive wins in Primeira Liga, thus scoring in every league match since 21 April 2012 (79 matches). Gonçalo Guedes made his debut. On 8 January, Bebé (Tiago) moved to Córdoba on loan. On 10 January, Benfica defeated Vitória de Guimarães (3–0) with goals from Jonas, Ola John and Nicolás Gaitán. Eliseu and Salvio returned after injury, the former was out of competition since 31 October. It was Júlio César's sixth consecutive league match without conceding a goal, in a total of 629 minutes. On 14 January, Benfica beat Arouca (4–0) in the third round of the Taça da Liga and became leader of Group A with six points. Pizzi, Cristante, Salvio, and Jonas scored the goals. Rui Fonte debuted and Sílvio returned after suffering an injury in April 2014. On 18 January, Benfica won at Marítimo (0–4) with goals from Salvio (2), Ola John and Lima. It was Benfica's ninth consecutive win and seventh match without conceding a goal in Primeira Liga, leading it with 46 points in 17 matches, with an efficiency of 90.2%, the best record of the Top 20 leagues in Europe. On 21 January, Benfica won at Moreirense (0–2) and secured the first place in the Taça da Liga's Group A with nine points, advancing to the semi-finals, without conceding a goal. On 26 January, Benfica lost at Paços de Ferreira (1–0) from a penalty kick in the 90th minute, ending the series of consecutive wins (9) and clean sheets (7) in the league. Lima failed a penalty kick in the first-half. Despite this, Benfica kept the lead with 6 more points than the second classified which also lost. On 29 January, Jonathan Rodríguez joined Benfica on loan from Peñarol. On 31 January, Benfica beat Boavista (3–0) with goals from Lima, Maxi Pereira and Jonas.

=== February ===
On 8 February, Benfica drew at Sporting CP (1–1) with a last-minute goal from Jardel in the 94th minute, and continued leading the Primeira Liga with 4 more points than the second classified. On 11 February, Benfica advanced to their sixth Taça da Liga final and second consecutive without conceding a goal, after beating Vitória de Setúbal (3–0) with goals from Talisca, Pizzi and Jonas. Ruben Amorim returned as a substitute after suffering an injury in August 2014. On 15 February, Benfica beat Vitória de Setúbal (3–0) in Primeira Liga, with goals from Jardel and Lima (2). On 21 February, Benfica won at Moreirense (1–3) with goals from Luisão, Eliseu and Jonas; and continued leading the Primeira Liga. On 28 February – on the club's 111th anniversary – Benfica thrashed Estoril (6–0) with goals from Luisão, Salvio, Pizzi, Jonas (2) and Lima; and set the league's biggest home win.

=== March ===
On 8 March, Benfica won at Arouca (1–3) with goals from Jonas and Lima (2). On 14 March, Benfica beat Braga (2–0) with goals from Jonas and Eliseu. On 21 March, Benfica lost at Rio Ave (2–1). Salvio scored for the Eagles.

=== April ===
On 4 April, Benfica beat Nacional (3–1) with goals from Jonas (2) and Lima. On 11 April, Benfica defeated Académica (5–1) with Jardel, Jonas (2), Lima and Ljubomir Fejsa scoring the goals; Fejsa returned to the first-team after an injury in April 2014, while Jonathan Rodríguez debuted in Primeira Liga. On 18 April, Benfica won at Belenenses (0–2), with Jonas scoring twice for a third consecutive league match. On 26 April, Benfica drew against Porto (0–0), and kept leading the Primeira Liga, three points ahead. It was the first time since 11 April 2009 that Benfica did not score at home in a league match.

=== May ===
On 2 May, Benfica won at Gil Vicente (0–5) with goals from Maxi Pereira (2), Jonas, Luisão and Lima. On 9 May, Benfica beat Penafiel (4–0) with goals from Lima (2), Jonas and Pizzi. On 17 May, Benfica drew at Guimarães (0–0) and became Portuguese champions for a second consecutive time, with one game to spare, three points ahead of Porto, which had drawn at Belenenses. On 23 May, Benfica beat Marítimo (4–1) with goals from Lima (2) and Jonas (2) in their last league match.

On 29 May, Benfica played their last match of the season, defeating Marítimo (2–1) in the Taça da Liga final, with goals from Jonas and Ola John, thus winning the club's sixth Taça da Liga and 75th title overall, a new Portuguese record.

== Players ==
=== Squad information ===
N	Pos.	Nat.	Name	Age	Since	App	Goals	Ends	Transfer fee	Notes
1	GK	(Brazil)	Artur	34	2011	144	0	2015	Free	
2	CB	(Argentina)	Lisandro	25	2014	10	0	2018	Undisclosed	
4	CB	(Brazil)	Luisão (captain)	34	2003	458	44	2017	Undisclosed	
5	DM	(Serbia)	Fejsa	26	2013	33	1	2018	Undisclosed	
6	DM	(Portugal)	Ruben Amorim	30	2008	154	6	2017	Undisclosed	Originally from youth system
7	CM	(Greece)	Samaris	26	2014	37	0	2019	€10,000,000	
8	LW	(Serbia)	Sulejmani	26	2013	34	3	2018	Free	
9	ST	(Brazil)	Derley	27	2014	27	2	2018	Undisclosed	
10	AM	(Argentina)	Nico Gaitán	27	2010	216	30	2018	€8,400,000	
11	ST	(Brazil)	Lima	31	2012	144	70	2016	Undisclosed	
13	GK	(Portugal)	Paulo Lopes	37	2012	9	0	2015	Free	Originally from youth system
14	RB	(Uruguay)	Maxi (VC)	31	2007	333	21	2015	€3,000,000	
15	LW	(Netherlands)	John	23	2012	87	9	2017	Undisclosed	
17	ST	(Brazil)	Jonas	31	2014	35	31	2016	Free	
18	RW	(Argentina)	Salvio	24	2012	150	38	2017	€13,500,000	Played on loan in the 2010–11 season
19	LB	(Portugal)	Eliseu	31	2014	33	4	2016	Undisclosed	
20	GK	(Brazil)	Júlio César	35	2014	30	0	2016	Free	
21	CM	(Portugal)	Pizzi	25	2014	31	4	2019	€6,000,000	
23	LB	(Switzerland)	Benito	23	2014	6	0	2019	Undisclosed	
24	DM	(Italy)	Cristante	20	2014	15	1	2019	€4,840,000	
25	ST	(Uruguay)	J. Rodríguez	21	2015	1	0	2017	€2,000,000	On loan with buy option
27	AM	(Germany)	Mukhtar	20	2015	1	0	2020	Undisclosed	
28	FB	(Portugal)	Sílvio	27	2013	25	0	2015	Loan	Originally from youth system
30	AM	(Brazil)	A. Talisca	21	2014	44	11	2019	€4,000,000	
33	CB	(Brazil)	Jardel	29	2011 (Winter)	125	6	2018	Undisclosed	
34	DM	(Portugal)	A. Almeida	24	2012	95	0	2018	Undisclosed	
37	CB	(Brazil)	César	22	2014	9	0	2019	Undisclosed	

- Source: S.L. Benfica
- Ordered by squad number.

=== Transfers ===
==== In ====
Date	Pos	No.	Player	Age	From	Ends	Fee	Ref
20 May 2014	MF	57	(Poland) Paweł Dawidowicz	19	(Poland) Lechia Gdańsk	2019	Undisclosed	
22 May 2014	FW	79	(Austria) Kevin Friesenbichler	20	(Germany) Bayern Munich II	2018	Free	
7 June 2014	DF	—	(Brazil) Djavan	26	(Brazil) Corinthians Alagoano	2018	Undisclosed	
20 June 2014	DF	37	(Brazil) César	21	(Brazil) Ponte Preta	2019	Undisclosed	
22 June 2014	DF	23	(Switzerland) Loris Benito	22	(Switzerland) Zürich	2019	Undisclosed	
3 July 2014	MF	50	(Portugal) Daniel Candeias	26	(Portugal) Nacional	2019	Free	
4 July 2014	DF	42	(Brazil) Luís Felipe	23	(Brazil) Palmeiras	2018	Free	
5 July 2014	MF	30	(Brazil) Talisca	20	(Brazil) Bahia	2019	€4,000,000	
11 July 2014	FW	31	(Brazil) Victor Andrade	18	(Brazil) Santos	2019	Free	
16 July 2014	FW	9	(Brazil) Derley	26	(Portugal) Marítimo	2018	Undisclosed	
24 July 2014	DF	19	(Portugal) Eliseu	30	(Spain) Málaga	2016	Undisclosed	
25 July 2014	FW	32	(Portugal) Bebé	24	(England) Manchester United	2018	Undisclosed	
19 August 2014	GK	20	(Brazil) Júlio César	34	(England) Queens Park Rangers	2016	Free	
22 August 2014	MF	7	(Greece) Andreas Samaris	25	(Greece) Olympiacos	2019	€10,000,000	
30 August 2014	FW	96	(Angola) Dolly Menga	21	(Belgium) Lierse	2017	Undisclosed	
1 September 2014	MF	24	(Italy) Bryan Cristante	19	(Italy) Milan	2019	€4,840,000	
1 September 2014	FW	59	(Montenegro) Oliver Sarkic	17	(Belgium) Anderlecht		Undisclosed	
11 September 2014	FW	17	(Brazil) Jonas	30	Unattached	2016	Free	
15 January 2015	MF	27	(Germany) Hany Mukhtar	19	(Germany) Hertha BSC	2020	Undisclosed	
29 January 2015	MF	80	(Uruguay) Elbio Álvarez	20	(Uruguay) Peñarol		€2,350,000	
1 February 2015	FW	91	(Portugal) Flávio Silva	18	(Portugal) Torreense	2020	Undisclosed	
24 February 2015	FW	—	(Portugal) Sancidino Silva	20	Unattached	2020	Free	

==== Loan in ====
Date	Pos	No.	Player	Age	From	Ends	Fee	Ref
1 September 2014	DF	28	(Portugal) Sílvio	26	(Spain) Atlético Madrid	30 June 2015	Free	
29 January 2015	FW	25	(Uruguay) Jonathan Rodríguez	21	(Uruguay) Peñarol	30 June 2017	€2,000,000 (40%)	
2 February 2015	DF	79	(Russia) Vitali Lystsov	19	(Portugal) União de Leiria	30 June 2015	Free	

==== Loan return ====
Date	Pos	Player	Age	From	Ends	Ref
2 July 2014	FW	(Argentina) Franco Jara	25	(Argentina) Estudiantes La Plata	2016	
2 July 2014	DF	(Argentina) Lisandro López	24	(Spain) Getafe	2018	
2 July 2014	MF	(Argentina) Luis Fariña	23	(United Arab Emirates) Baniyas	2018	
2 July 2014	FW	(Portugal) Nélson Oliveira	22	(France) Rennes	2018	
2 July 2014	FW	(Netherlands) Ola John	22	(Germany) Hamburger SV	2017	
2 July 2014	MF	(Portugal) Pizzi	24	(Spain) Espanyol	2019	
1 September 2014	FW	(Brazil) Michel	27	(Qatar) Al-Wakrah	—	
1 September 2014	DF	(Uruguay) Jim Varela	19	(Portugal) Farense	2018	
1 September 2014	FW	(Uruguay) Juan San Martín	20	(Portugal) Farense	2018	
1 September 2014	FW	(Mozambique) Clésio Baúque	19	(United States) Harrisburg City Islanders	2018	
2 December 2014	FW	(Portugal) Yannick Djaló	28	(United States) San Jose Earthquakes	2016	

==== Out ====
Date	Pos	No.	Player	Age	Private company	Fee	Ref
31 January 2014	MF	30	(Portugal) André Gomes	20	Meriton Capital Limited	€10,500,000 (70%) (+ 25%)	
31 January 2014	FW	19	(Spain) Rodrigo	22	Meriton Capital Limited	€22,800,000 (76%) (+ €10,000,000)	
July 2013–March 2014	FW	—	(Paraguay) Cláudio Correa	—	Master International FZC	Undisclosed	
July 2013–March 2014	FW	—	(Paraguay) Derlis González	—	Master International FZC	Undisclosed	

Date	Pos	No.	Player	Age	To	Fee	Ref
6 May 2014	FW	—	(Brazil) Alan Kardec	25	(Brazil) São Paulo	€2,250,000 (50%) (+ 10%)	
20 May 2014	FW	—	(Paraguay) Derlis González	20	(Switzerland) Basel	Undisclosed	
6 June 2014	DF	16	(Brazil) Guilherme Siqueira	28	(Spain) Granada	End of loan	
17 June 2014	FW	—	(Portugal) Filipe Nascimento	19	(Portugal) Académico de Viseu	Free	
20 June 2014	GK	—	(Brazil) Rafael Copetti	23	(Brazil) Vasco da Gama	Undisclosed (50%)	
25 June 2014	DF	24	(Argentina) Ezequiel Garay	27	(Russia) Zenit Saint Petersburg	€2,400,000 (40%)	
30 June 2014	DF	96	(China) Huang Wei	20	(Portugal) Farense	End of contract	
30 June 2014	FW	74	(Guinea-Bissau) Sancidino Silva	20	Unattached	End of contract	
8 July 2014	DF	—	(Portugal) Rafael Ramos	19	(United States) Orlando City	Undisclosed	
8 July 2014	MF	—	(Angola) Valdomiro Lameira	18	(United States) Orlando City	Undisclosed	
14 July 2014	DF	—	(Serbia) Stefan Mitrović	24	(Germany) SC Freiburg	€1,175,000	
15 July 2014	MF	50	(Serbia) Lazar Marković	20	(England) Liverpool	€12,500,000 (50%)	
16 July 2014	GK	41	(Slovenia) Jan Oblak	21	(Spain) Atlético Madrid	€16,000,000	
22 July 2014	FW	—	(Paraguay) Cláudio Correa	21	(Paraguay) Sol de América	Undisclosed	
2 August 2014	DF	—	(Brazil) Djavan	26	(Portugal) Braga	€1,000,000	
4 August 2014	FW	7	(Paraguay) Óscar Cardozo	31	(Turkey) Trabzonspor	€4,000,000 (80%) (+ €1,650,000)	
15 August 2014	MF	51	(Serbia) Filip Marković	22	(Spain) Mallorca	Undisclosed	
22 August 2014	DF	88	(Guinea-Bissau) Rudinilson Silva	20	(Poland) Lechia Gdańsk	Undisclosed	
1 September 2014	FW	23	(Uruguay) Jonathan Urretaviscaya	24	(Portugal) Paços de Ferreira	End of contract	
16 September 2014	MF	17	(Portugal) Carlos Martins	32	Unattached	End of contract	
2 January 2015	MF	35	(Argentina) Enzo Pérez	28	(Spain) Valencia	€25,000,000	
20 January 2015	MF	—	(Portugal) Bernardo Silva	20	(France) Monaco	€15,750,000	
24 January 2015	FW	22	(Argentina) Franco Jara	26	(Greece) Olympiacos	€1,500,000	
27 January 2015	MF	54	(Portugal) João Amorim	22	(Portugal) Desportivo das Aves	End of contract	
2 February 2015	FW	—	(Brazil) Michel	28	(Portugal) Penafiel	End of contract	
2 February 2015	FW	96	(Angola) Dolly Menga	21	(Portugal) Braga	Undisclosed	

==== Loan out ====
Date	Pos	No.	Player	Age	To	Ends	Ref
8 July 2014	MF	—	(Paraguay) Jorge Rojas	21	(Argentina) Gimnasia	31 December 2015	
8 July 2014	FW	9	(Argentina) Rogelio Funes Mori	23	(Turkey) Eskişehirspor	30 June 2015	
17 July 2014	MF	30	(Portugal) André Gomes	20	(Spain) Valencia	30 June 2015	
23 July 2014	MF	10	(Serbia) Filip Đuričić	22	(Germany) Mainz 05	~~30 June 2015~~	
23 July 2014	FW	19	(Spain) Rodrigo	23	(Spain) Valencia	30 June 2015	
27 July 2014	MF	—	(Argentina) Luis Fariña	23	(Spain) Deportivo La Coruña	30 June 2015	
7 August 2014	MF	94	(Portugal) Bernardo Silva	19	(France) Monaco	30 June 2015	
7 August 2014	FW	90	(Portugal) Ivan Cavaleiro	20	(Spain) Deportivo La Coruña	30 June 2015	
13 August 2014	DF	42	(Brazil) Luís Felipe	23	(Brazil) Criciúma	31 December 2014	
20 August 2014	DF	—	(Portugal) João Cancelo	20	(Spain) Valencia	30 June 2015	
24 August 2014	MF	50	(Portugal) Daniel Candeias	26	(Germany) 1. FC Nürnberg	~~30 June 2015~~	
25 August 2014	FW	79	(Austria) Kevin Friesenbichler	20	(Poland) Lechia Gdańsk	30 June 2015	
30 August 2014	MF	56	(Spain) Lolo	21	(Spain) Lugo	30 June 2015	
30 August 2014	MF	95	(Portugal) Raphael Guzzo	19	(Portugal) Chaves	30 June 2015	
1 September 2014	DF	—	(Brazil) Sidnei	25	(Spain) Deportivo La Coruña	30 June 2015	
1 September 2014	FW	80	(São Tomé and Príncipe) Harramiz Soares	24	(Portugal) Farense	30 June 2015	
1 September 2014	DF	76	(Portugal) Bruno Gaspar	21	(Portugal) Vitória de Guimarães	30 June 2015	
11 September 2014	FW	—	(Uruguay) Juan San Martín	20	(Uruguay) Central Español	30 June 2015	
1 January 2015	FW	16	(Portugal) Nélson Oliveira	23	(England) Swansea City	30 June 2015	
5 January 2015	DF	42	(Brazil) Luís Felipe	23	(Brazil) Joinville	~~31 December 2015~~	
7 January 2015	MF	77	(Portugal) Rúben Pinto	22	(Portugal) Paços de Ferreira	30 June 2015	
8 January 2015	FW	32	(Portugal) Bebé	24	(Spain) Córdoba	30 June 2015	
15 January 2015	DF	65	(Portugal) Fábio Cardoso	20	(Portugal) Paços de Ferreira	30 June 2015	
19 January 2015	FW	67	(Portugal) Hélder Costa	21	(Spain) Deportivo La Coruña	30 June 2015	
21 January 2015	MF	—	(Uruguay) Jim Varela	20	(Uruguay) Rampla Juniors		
26 January 2015	FW	—	(Portugal) Yannick Djaló	28	(Russia) Mordovia Saransk	30 June 2015	
26 January 2015	MF	70	(Portugal) Rochinha	19	(England) Bolton Wanderers	30 June 2015	
29 January 2015	MF	50	(Portugal) Daniel Candeias	26	(Spain) Granada	30 June 2015	
2 February 2015	MF	—	(Serbia) Filip Đuričić	23	(England) Southampton	30 June 2015	
2 February 2015	FW	83	(Portugal) Rui Fonte	24	(Portugal) Belenenses	30 June 2015	
5 February 2015	DF	—	(Uruguay) Gianni Rodríguez	20	(Uruguay) Peñarol	30 June 2015	
9 February 2015	DF	3	(Portugal) Steven Vitória	28	(United States) Philadelphia Union	31 December 2015	
12 May 2015	DF	42	(Brazil) Luís Felipe	23	(Brazil) Paysandu	31 December 2015	

==== Overall transfer activity ====
Spending

Other: €0

Summer: ▼€31,940,000

Winter: ▼€2,000,000

Total: ▼€33,940,000

Income

Other: ▲€33,300,000

Summer: ▲€40,525,000

Winter: ▲€42,250,000

Total: ▲€116,075,000

Expenditure

Other: ▲€33,300,000

Summer: ▲€8,585,000

Winter: ▲€40,250,000

Total: ▲€82,135,000

Notes

1. Includes €1,200,000 in transfer fees of former Benfica players: €75,000 from Zenit Saint Petersburg corresponding to 0.5% of Javi García, and €1,125,000 from Manchester United corresponding to 1.5% of Ángel Di María.

== Technical staff ==
Position	Name
Head coach	Jorge Jesus
Assistant coach	Raúl José; Miguel Quaresma; Minervino Pietra
Goalkeeping coach	Hugo Oliveira
Fitness coach	Mário Monteiro
Motivational consultant	Evandro Mota
Video analyst	Marco Pedroso

Source: S.L. Benfica

== Pre-season friendlies ==
Win Draw Loss

18 July 2014 Taça de Honra Semi-final	Benfica	1–0	Estoril	Lisbon, Portugal
19:00 WEST	Talisca 31'; Cancelo (yellow card) 62'	Report	Mano (yellow card) 36'; Tavares (yellow card) 85'	Stadium: Estádio do Restelo; Referee: Ricardo Baixinho (Portugal)

20 July 2014 Taça de Honra Final	Benfica	0–1	Sporting CP	Lisbon, Portugal
20:30 WEST	Talisca (yellow card) 45'; Silva (yellow card) 86'	Report	Martins 42'; Rosell (yellow card) 88'	Stadium: Estádio do Restelo; Attendance: 10,632; Referee: Rui Rodrigues (Portugal)

23 July 2014 Friendly	Marseille	2–1	Benfica	Clermont-Ferrand, France
20:00 CEST	Gignac 21'; Thauvin (yellow card) 27'; Dja Djédjé (yellow card) 31'; Batshuayi 56'; Sparagna (yellow card) 57'	Report	Gaitán 14' (yellow card) 27'; Talisca (yellow card) 30'; Jara (red card) 60'	Stadium: Stade Gabriel Montpied; Attendance: 12,000; Referee: Ruddy Buquet (France)

26 July 2014 Eusébio Cup	Benfica	0–1	Ajax	Lisbon, Portugal
19:45 WEST	Gaitán (yellow card) 15'; Teixeira (yellow card) 92'	Report	Kishna 41'; Milik (yellow card) 94'	Stadium: Estádio da Luz; Attendance: 25,240; Referee: Hugo Miguel (Portugal)

30 July 2014 Valais Cup	Sion	0–2	Benfica	Yverdon-les-Bains, Switzerland
19:30 CEST		Report	Jara 15'; Teixeira 50'	Stadium: Stade Municipal; Attendance: 3,400; Referee: Fedayi San (Switzerland)

31 July 2014 Valais Cup	Benfica	0–2	Athletic Bilbao	Fribourg, Switzerland
19:30 CEST	Tiago (yellow card) 63'; Jara (yellow card) 81'	Report	Aduriz 40'; Gómez (yellow card) 60'; Beñat 72'	Stadium: Stade Universitaire Saint-Léonard; Attendance: 3,600; Referee: Stephan Klossner (Switzerland)

2 August 2014 Emirates Cup	Arsenal	5–1	Benfica	London, England
16:20 BST	Monreal (yellow card) 20'; Sanogo 26', 44', 45+1', 49'; Campbell 40'	Report	Gaitán 61'; Benito (yellow card) 83'	Stadium: Emirates Stadium; Referee: Lee Mason (England)

3 August 2014 Emirates Cup	Benfica	1–3	Valencia	London, England
14:00 BST	Derley 2'; Teixeira (yellow card) 80'	Report	Gayà 49'; Piatti 54'; Guardado 60'	Stadium: Emirates Stadium; Referee: Ryuji Sato (Japan)

== Competitions ==
=== Overall record ===
Performance by competition
Competition	Starting round	Final position/round	First match	Last match
Primeira Liga	—N/a	1st	17 August 2014	23 May 2015
Taça de Portugal	Third round	Fifth round	18 October 2014	18 December 2014
Taça da Liga	Third round	Winners	30 December 2014	29 May 2015
Supertaça	—N/a	Winners	10 August 2014	
UEFA Champions League	Group stage	Group stage (4th)	16 September 2014	9 December 2014

Statistics by competition
Competition	Pld	W	D	L	GF	GA	GD	Win%
Primeira Liga	34	27	4	3	86	16	+70	79.41
Taça de Portugal	3	2	0	1	8	5	+3	66.67
Taça da Liga	5	5	0	0	12	1	+11	100.00
Supertaça	1	0	1	0	0	0	+0	0.00
UEFA Champions League	6	1	2	3	2	6	−4	16.67
Total	49	35	7	7	108	28	+80	71.43

=== Supertaça Cândido de Oliveira ===
10 August 2014	Benfica	0–0 (a.e.t.) (3–2 p)	Rio Ave	Aveiro
20:45 WEST (UTC+01:00)	Pérez (yellow card) 44'	Report	Pinto (yellow card) 53'; Filipe Augusto (yellow card) 80'; Lopes (yellow card) 90'; Cássio (yellow card) 110'; Wakaso (yellow card) 111'	Stadium: Estádio Municipal de Aveiro; Attendance: 29,895; Referee: Duarte Gomes (Lisbon); Man of the Match: Enzo Pérez
	Penalties
	Derley (penalty missed); Lima (penalty scored); Tiago (penalty scored); Luisão (penalty scored)		(penalty missed) Tarantini; (penalty scored) Filipe Augusto; (penalty scored) Ukra; (penalty missed) Lopes; (penalty missed) Pinto

=== Primeira Liga ===
==== League table ====
Pos	Team	Pld	W	D	L	GF	GA	GD	Pts	Qualification or relegation
1	Benfica (C)	34	27	4	3	86	16	+70	85	Qualification for the Champions League group stage
2	Porto	34	25	7	2	74	13	+61	82	Qualification for the Champions League group stage
3	Sporting CP	34	22	10	2	67	29	+38	76	Qualification for the Champions League play-off round
4	Braga	34	17	7	10	55	28	+27	58	Qualification for the Europa League group stage (Note: Since Sporting CP won the 2014–15 Taça de Portugal, the spot awarded to the cup winner (Europa League group stage) was passed to the fourth-placed team and the spot originally meant for the fourth-placed team (Europa League third qualifying round) was given to the sixth-placed team.)
5	Vitória de Guimarães	34	15	10	9	50	35	+15	55	Qualification for the Europa League third qualifying round

Source: LPFP
Rules for classification: 1) points; 2) points in matches between tied teams; 3) goal difference in matches between tied teams; 4) away goals in matches between tied teams; 5) goal difference; 6) wins; 7) goals scored. The LPFP decided that only criteria 1, 5, 6 and 7 would be applied to establish the classification during the competition. Qualification for the 2015–16 Europa League has changed: the best-placed non-qualified domestic championship club will enter the UEFA Europa League from the 2015–16 season, rather than the domestic cup runners-up, should the domestic cup winners also qualify for the UEFA Champions League via the final championship standings.
(C) Champions

==== Results by round ====
Round	1	2	3	4	5	6	7	8	9	10	11	12	13	14	15	16	17	18	19	20	21	22	23	24	25	26	27	28	29	30	31	32	33	34
Ground	H	A	H	A	H	A	H	A	H	A	A	H	A	H	A	H	A	A	H	A	H	A	H	A	H	A	H	H	A	H	A	H	A	H
Result	W	W	D	W	W	W	W	L	W	W	W	W	W	W	W	W	W	L	W	D	W	W	W	W	W	L	W	W	W	D	W	W	D	W
Position	4	4	5	3	1	1	1	1	1	1	1	1	1	1	1	1	1	1	1	1	1	1	1	1	1	1	1	1	1	1	1	1	1	1

Source: LPFP
A = Away; H = Home; W = Win; D = Draw; L = Loss

==== Matches ====
17 August 2014 1	Benfica	2–0	Paços de Ferreira	Lisbon
19:15 WEST (UTC+01:00)	Pérez (yellow card) 5'; Pereira 25'; Salvio 72'; Almeida (yellow card) 76'	Report	Lopes (yellow card) 27'	Stadium: Estádio da Luz; Attendance: 42,536; Referee: Cosme Machado (Braga)

24 August 2014 2	Boavista	0–1	Benfica	Porto
19:30 WEST (UTC+01:00)	Bobô (yellow card) 56' (yellow-red card) 86'; Dias (yellow card) 77'; Tengarrinha (yellow card) 90+2'	Report	Jara (yellow card) 37'; Eliseu 43'; Talisca (yellow card) 56'; Pereira (yellow card) 61'	Stadium: Estádio do Bessa; Attendance: 10,702; Referee: Marco Ferreira (Madeira)

31 August 2014 3	Benfica	1–1	Sporting CP	Lisbon
19:00 WEST (UTC+01:00)	Gaitán 12'; Pereira (yellow card) 31'; Pérez (yellow card) 70'; Salvio (yellow card) 90+3'	Report	Slimani 20'; Carrillo (yellow card) 25'; Esgaio (yellow card) 33'; Silva (yellow card) 69'	Stadium: Estádio da Luz; Attendance: 61,895; Referee: Pedro Proença (Lisbon)

12 September 2014 4	Vitória de Setúbal	0–5	Benfica	Setúbal
20:30 WEST (UTC+01:00)	Queirós (yellow card) 18'; Lourenço (yellow card) 41'; Dani (yellow card) 45'; Pedro (yellow card) 85'	Report	Eliseu (yellow card) 1'; Salvio 10' (yellow card) 57'; Gaitán (yellow card) 30'; Talisca 38', 43', 51'; John 76'	Stadium: Estádio do Bonfim; Attendance: 10,000; Referee: João Capela (Lisbon)

21 September 2014 5	Benfica	3–1	Moreirense	Lisbon
17:00 WEST (UTC+01:00)	Talisca (yellow card) 52'; Eliseu 68'; Pereira 77'; Lima 83' (pen.)	Report	João Pedro 16'; Oliveira (yellow card) 36' (yellow-red card) 56'; Arsénio (yellow card) 39'; Anilton (yellow card) 82'	Stadium: Estádio da Luz; Attendance: 37,126; Referee: Luís Ferreira (Braga)

27 September 2014 6	Estoril	2–3	Benfica	Estoril
18:30 WEST (UTC+01:00)	Bruno Miguel (yellow card) 19'; Amado 38'; Cabrera (yellow card) 40' (yellow-red card) 66'; Kléber 53'; Gonçalves (yellow card) 56'	Report	Talisca 3', 8'; Pérez (yellow card) 42'; Lima 71'; Eliseu (yellow card) 81'	Stadium: Estádio António Coimbra da Mota; Attendance: 7,587; Referee: Vasco Santos (Porto)

5 October 2014 7	Benfica	4–0	Arouca	Lisbon
18:00 WEST (UTC+01:00)	Salvio (yellow card) 28' (goal) 83'; Samaris (yellow card) 72'; Talisca 75'; Derley 80'; Jonas 88'	Report	Artur (yellow card) 28'; Nelsinho (yellow card) 44'; Oliveira (yellow card) 49'; Bruno Amaro (yellow card) 63'	Stadium: Estádio da Luz; Attendance: 41,665; Referee: Hugo Miguel (Lisbon)

26 October 2014 8	Braga	2–1	Benfica	Braga
20:15 WET (UTC±00:00)	Santos (yellow card) 3'; Danilo (yellow card) 20' (yellow-red card) 90'; Eder 28' (yellow card) 49'; Gomes (yellow card) 42'; Pardo (yellow card) 54'; Rúben Micael (yellow card) 79'; Agra 81'	Report	Talisca 2'; Samaris (yellow card) 25'; Pérez (yellow card) 90'	Stadium: Estádio Municipal de Braga; Attendance: 21,078; Referee: Marco Ferreira (Madeira)

31 October 2014 9	Benfica	1–0	Rio Ave	Lisbon
19:45 WET (UTC±00:00)	Talisca (yellow card) 29' (goal) 60'; Almeida (yellow card) 86'	Report	Gouano (yellow card) 10'; Wakaso (yellow card) 18'; Lopes (yellow card) 56'	Stadium: Estádio da Luz; Attendance: 36,599; Referee: Manuel Mota (Braga)

9 November 2014 10	Nacional	1–2	Benfica	Funchal
16:00 WET (UTC±00:00)	Abreu 1'; Júnior (yellow card) 28'; Marçal (yellow card) 29'; Suk (yellow card) 43'	Report	Salvio 7'; Jonas 19' (yellow card) 77'; Samaris (yellow card) 59'; Pereira (yellow card) 83'; Júlio César (yellow card) 89'	Stadium: Estádio da Madeira; Attendance: 5,239; Referee: Bruno Paixão (Setúbal)

30 November 2014 11	Académica de Coimbra	0–2	Benfica	Coimbra
18:00 WET (UTC±00:00)	Alexandre (yellow card) 19'; Marcos Paulo (yellow card) 42'; Rui Pedro (yellow card) 55'; Ivanildo (yellow card) 70'; Marinho (yellow card) 86' (red card) 90+5'	Report	Gaitán 8'; Jonas (yellow card) 39'; Luisão 45'; Almeida (yellow card) 61'; Pereira (yellow card) 67'; Jardel (yellow card) 73'	Stadium: Estádio Cidade de Coimbra; Attendance: 12,582; Referee: Jorge Ferreira (Braga)

6 December 2014 12	Benfica	3–0	Belenenses	Lisbon
17:00 WET (UTC±00:00)	Júlio César (yellow card) 56'; Almeida (yellow card) 49'; Lima 64' (pen.); Pérez 70'; Salvio 82'	Report	Caeiro (yellow card) 37'	Stadium: Estádio da Luz; Attendance: 46,611; Referee: Manuel Oliveira (Porto)

14 December 2014 13	Porto	0–2	Benfica	Porto
20:00 WET (UTC±00:00)	Danilo (yellow card) 12'; Casemiro (yellow card) 54'	Report	Almeida (yellow card) 2'; Lima 36', 55'; Pérez (yellow card) 38'; Gaitán (yellow card) 47'; Samaris (yellow card) 87'	Stadium: Estádio do Dragão; Attendance: 48,109; Referee: Jorge Sousa (Porto)

21 December 2014 14	Benfica	1–0	Gil Vicente	Lisbon
17:00 WET (UTC±00:00)	Samaris (yellow card) 19'; Gaitán 30'; César (yellow card) 71'	Report	Jander (yellow card) 43'; Vilela (yellow card) 44'; Paulinho (yellow card) 72'; Viana (yellow card) 79' (yellow-red card) 90+3'	Stadium: Estádio da Luz; Attendance: 40,219; Referee: João Capela (Lisbon)

4 January 2015 15	Penafiel	0–3	Benfica	Penafiel
19:15 WET (UTC±00:00)	Sousa (yellow card) 17'; Tony (yellow card) 23' (yellow-red card) 65'; Martins (yellow card) 64'; Ribeiro (yellow card) 73'	Report	Talisca (yellow card) 31' (goal) 36'; Pereira (yellow card) 70'; Jonas 78'; Jardel 87'	Stadium: Estádio Municipal 25 de Abril; Attendance: 4,079; Referee: Paulo Baptista (Portalegre)

10 January 2015 16	Benfica	3–0	Vitória de Guimarães	Lisbon
17:00 WET (UTC±00:00)	Jonas 14'; Samaris (yellow card) 30'; Gaitán (yellow card) 38' (goal) 90'; John 54'; César (yellow card) 63'	Report	Hernâni (yellow card) 9'; André (yellow card) 61'	Stadium: Estádio da Luz; Attendance: 44,065; Referee: Rui Costa (Porto)

18 January 2015 17	Marítimo	0–4	Benfica	Funchal
18:00 WET (UTC±00:00)	Maâzou (yellow card) 23'	Report	Salvio 18', 57'; Talisca (yellow card) 27' (yellow-red card) 89'; John 53'; Lima 64'	Stadium: Estádio dos Barreiros; Attendance: 7,097; Referee: Carlos Xistra (Castelo Branco)

26 January 2015 18	Paços de Ferreira	1–0	Benfica	Paços de Ferreira
20:00 WET (UTC±00:00)	Oliveira 90' (pen.) (yellow card) 90+4'	Report	Samaris (yellow card) 71'; Eliseu (yellow card) 88'	Stadium: Estádio da Mata Real; Attendance: 6,404; Referee: Bruno Paixão (Setúbal)

31 January 2015 19	Benfica	3–0	Boavista	Lisbon
17:00 WET (UTC±00:00)	Lima 23'; Pereira 32' (yellow card) 90+1'; Jonas 54' (pen.)	Report	Figueiredo (yellow card) 54'; Sampaio (yellow card) 71'	Stadium: Estádio da Luz; Attendance: 40,346; Referee: Hugo Miguel (Lisbon)

8 February 2015 20	Sporting CP	1–1	Benfica	Lisbon
20:00 WET (UTC±00:00)	Cédric (yellow card) 62'; Jefferson 88' (yellow card) 88'	Report	Pereira (yellow card) 54'; Eliseu (yellow card) 60'; Almeida (yellow card) 67'; Samaris (yellow card) 84'; Jardel 90+4'	Stadium: Estádio José Alvalade; Attendance: 49,076; Referee: Jorge Sousa (Porto)

15 February 2015 21	Benfica	3–0	Vitória de Setúbal	Lisbon
17:00 WET (UTC±00:00)	Jardel 9'; Lima 40', 71'; Samaris (yellow card) 70'; Salvio (yellow card) 72'; Luisão (yellow card) 82'; Guedes (yellow card) 87'	Report	Pedro (yellow card) 42'; Kiko (yellow card) 64'	Stadium: Estádio da Luz; Attendance: 40,564; Referee: Manuel Oliveira (Porto)

21 February 2015 22	Moreirense	1–3	Benfica	Moreira de Cónegos
19:00 WET (UTC±00:00)	João Pedro 35' (yellow card) 58'; Marafona (yellow card) 49'; Simões (red card) 60'; Battaglia (yellow card) 86'	Report	Luisão 58'; López (yellow card) 65'; Eliseu 66'; Jonas 73'	Stadium: Parque de Jogos Comendador Joaquim de Almeida Freitas; Attendance: 5,793; Referee: Jorge Ferreira (Braga)

28 February 2015 23	Benfica	6–0	Estoril	Lisbon
17:00 WET (UTC±00:00)	Luisão 16'; Salvio 26'; Pizzi 33'; Jonas 35', 86'; Lima 56' (pen.); Gaitán (yellow card) 70'; Pereira (yellow card) 79'	Report	Esiti (yellow card) 24' (yellow-red card) 68'	Stadium: Estádio da Luz; Attendance: 46,712; Referee: João Capela (Lisbon)

8 March 2015 24	Arouca	1–3	Benfica	Arouca
16:00 WET (UTC±00:00)	Medeiros 7'; Simão (yellow card) 22'; Nelsinho (yellow card) 41'; Artur (yellow card) 44'; Basto (red card) 62'	Report	Jonas 51' (yellow card) 69'; Lima 56', 76'; Talisca (yellow card) 85'	Stadium: Estádio Municipal de Arouca; Attendance: 6,960; Referee: Vasco Santos (Porto)

14 March 2015 25	Benfica	2–0	Braga	Lisbon
17:00 WET (UTC±00:00)	Samaris (yellow card) 17'; Jonas 21' (yellow card) 45'; Gaitán (yellow card) 63'; Eliseu 77'	Report	Baiano (yellow card) 7'; Gomes (yellow card) 25' (yellow-red card) 59'; Danilo (yellow card) 35'	Stadium: Estádio da Luz; Attendance: 60,222; Referee: Artur Soares Dias (Porto)

21 March 2015 26	Rio Ave	2–1	Benfica	Vila do Conde
18:00 WET (UTC±00:00)	Pinto (yellow card) 57'; Ukra (yellow card) 65' (goal) 73' (pen.); Zeegelaar (yellow card) 89'; Del Valle 90+5' (yellow card) 90+5'	Report	Salvio 5'; Talisca (yellow card) 58'; Pizzi (yellow card) 68'; Samaris (yellow card) 72'; Luisão (red card) 85'	Stadium: Estádio do Rio Ave FC; Attendance: 9,692; Referee: Marco Ferreira (Madeira)

4 April 2015 27	Benfica	3–1	Nacional	Lisbon
17:00 WEST (UTC+01:00)	Jonas 21', 58'; Lima 30'; Eliseu (yellow card) 90+2'; Amorim (yellow card) 90+2'	Report	Sequeira (yellow card) 49'; Rodrigues 74'	Stadium: Estádio da Luz; Attendance: 48,572; Referee: Carlos Xistra (Castelo Branco)

11 April 2015 28	Benfica	5–1	Académica de Coimbra	Lisbon
17:00 WEST (UTC+01:00)	Jardel 8'; Jonas 11', 53'; Lima 19' (pen.); Pereira (yellow card) 78'; Fejsa 84'	Report	Lopes 80'	Stadium: Estádio da Luz; Attendance: 56,197; Referee: Luís Ferreira (Braga)

18 April 2015 29	Belenenses	0–2	Benfica	Lisbon
18:00 WEST (UTC+01:00)	Meira (yellow card) 34'	Report	Jonas 6', 60'; Almeida (yellow card) 77'; Júlio César (yellow card) 78'	Stadium: Estádio do Restelo; Attendance: 15,137; Referee: Rui Costa (Porto)

26 April 2015 30	Benfica	0–0	Porto	Lisbon
17:00 WEST (UTC+01:00)	Eliseu (yellow card) 19'; Gaitán (yellow card) 24'; Fejsa (yellow card) 77'; Júlio César (yellow card) 86'	Report	Danilo (yellow card) 47'; Quaresma (yellow card) 59'; Martínez (yellow card) 61'; Marcano (yellow card) 73'; Maicon (yellow card) 90'	Stadium: Estádio da Luz; Attendance: 63,534; Referee: Jorge Sousa (Porto)

2 May 2015 31	Gil Vicente	0–5	Benfica	Barcelos
18:00 WEST (UTC+01:00)	Cadú (yellow card) 38'; Berger (yellow card) 70'	Report	Pereira 15', 70'; Jonas 22'; Luisão 46'; Lima 59'; Jardel (yellow card) 79'; Eliseu (yellow card) 87'	Stadium: Estádio Cidade de Barcelos; Attendance: 8,532; Referee: João Capela (Lisbon)

9 May 2015 32	Benfica	4–0	Penafiel	Lisbon
17:00 WEST (UTC+01:00)	Lima 8', 63'; Jonas 30'; Pizzi 61'; Samaris (yellow card) 69'; Pereira (yellow card) 69'; Jardel (yellow card) 72'	Report	Vítor Bruno (yellow card) 69'; Rabiola (yellow card) 71'	Stadium: Estádio da Luz; Attendance: 57,540; Referee: Jorge Tavares (Aveiro)

17 May 2015 33	Vitória de Guimarães	0–0	Benfica	Guimarães
18:00 WEST (UTC+01:00)	Otávio (yellow card) 24'; Afonso (yellow card) 59'	Report	Pereira (yellow card) 25'; Fejsa (yellow card) 45+2'	Stadium: Estádio D. Afonso Henriques; Attendance: 28,875; Referee: Artur Soares Dias (Porto)

23 May 2015 34	Benfica	4–1	Marítimo	Lisbon
18:00 WEST (UTC+01:00)	Lima 6', 59'; Jonas 42', 83'	Report	Marega 32'; Ferreira (yellow card) 45'; João Diogo (yellow card) 89'	Stadium: Estádio da Luz; Attendance: 60,532; Referee: Nuno Almeida (Algarve)

=== Taça de Portugal ===
==== Third round ====
18 October 2014	Sporting da Covilhã	2–3	Benfica	Covilhã
19:45 WEST (UTC+01:00)	Moreira (yellow card) 1'; Traquina 9' (yellow card) 90+2'; Nana (yellow card) 31'; Erivelto 43'	Report	Jonas 2' (pen.), 54', 71' (yellow card) 53'; Artur (yellow card) 89'	Stadium: Complexo Desportivo da Covilhã; Attendance: 7,000; Referee: Rui Costa (Porto)

==== Fourth round ====
22 November 2014	Benfica	4–1	Moreirense	Lisbon
19:45 WET (UTC±00:00)	Jonas 3', 7'; Salvio 22', 57'; Talisca (yellow card) 80'; Júlio César (yellow card) 85'	Report	Cardozo 26' (yellow card) 60'; Elízio (yellow card) 86'	Stadium: Estádio da Luz; Attendance: 22,447; Referee: Jorge Tavares (Aveiro)

==== Fifth round ====
18 December 2014	Benfica	1–2	Braga	Lisbon
20:00 WET (UTC±00:00)	Pereira (yellow card) 10'; Jonas 33'	Report	Pardo (yellow card) 11' (goal) 58'; Djavan (yellow card) 35'; Danilo (yellow card) 38'; Santos 48'; Rúben Micael (yellow card) 56'; Kritsyuk (yellow card) 61'; Pinto (yellow card) 88'	Stadium: Estádio da Luz; Attendance: 28,234; Referee: Artur Soares Dias (Porto)

=== Taça da Liga ===
==== Third round ====
Pos	Team	Pld	W	D	L	GF	GA	GD	Pts	Qualification
1	Benfica	3	3	0	0	7	0	+7	9	Advances to knockout phase
2	Moreirense	3	1	1	1	3	3	0	4	
3	Arouca	3	1	0	2	1	6	−5	3	
4	Nacional	3	0	1	2	1	3	−2	1	

Source: LPFP
Rules for classification: Tiebreakers

30 December 2014 1	Benfica	1–0	Nacional	Lisbon
21:15 WET (UTC±00:00)	Jonas 10'; John (yellow card) 20'; Pereira (yellow card) 67'	Report	Gomaa (yellow card) 51' (yellow-red card) 85'; Ghazal (yellow card) 79'	Stadium: Estádio da Luz; Attendance: 15,542; Referee: Nuno Almeida (Algarve)

14 January 2015 2	Benfica	4–0	Arouca	Lisbon
20:45 WET (UTC±00:00)	Pizzi 31' (pen.); Cristante (yellow card) 39' (goal) 42'; Salvio 83'; Jonas 84'	Report	Simão (yellow card) 27'; Dabó (red card) 30'; Vuletich (yellow card) 55'	Stadium: Estádio da Luz; Attendance: 11,955; Referee: Bruno Esteves (Setúbal)

21 January 2015 3	Moreirense	0–2	Benfica	Moreira de Cónegos
20:30 WET (UTC±00:00)	Gerso (yellow card) 67'	Report	Derley (yellow card) 23' (goal) 67'; Cristante (yellow card) 60'; Jonas 64'	Stadium: Parque de Jogos Comendador Joaquim de Almeida Freitas; Attendance: 2,818; Referee: Jorge Tavares (Aveiro)

==== Semi-finals ====
11 February 2015	Benfica	3–0	Vitória de Setúbal	Lisbon
19:45 WET (UTC±00:00)	Sílvio (yellow card) 34'; Talisca 41' (pen.) (yellow card) 71'; Pizzi 45' (pen.); Jonas 73'; Derley (yellow card) 87'	Report	Advíncula (red card) 39'; Tavares (yellow card) 44'; Queirós (yellow card) 53'; Santos (yellow card) 90+1'	Stadium: Estádio da Luz; Attendance: 13,101; Referee: Rui Costa (Porto)

==== Final ====
29 May 2015	Benfica	2–1	Marítimo	Coimbra
19:45 WEST (UTC+01:00)	Jonas 37' (yellow card) 86'; John 80' (yellow card) 81'; Pereira (yellow card) 85'; Luisão (yellow card) 90+3'	Report	Briguel (yellow card) 32'; Silva (yellow card) 32' (yellow-red card) 48'; Marega (yellow card) 36'; João Diogo 56'; Gallo (yellow card) 59'; Ferreira (yellow card) 67'; Fransérgio (yellow card) 74'; Bessa (yellow card) 85'	Stadium: Estádio Cidade de Coimbra; Attendance: 28,517; Referee: Carlos Xistra (Castelo Branco)

=== UEFA Champions League ===
==== Group stage ====
Pos	Team	Pld	W	D	L	GF	GA	GD	Pts	Qualification	MON	LEV	ZEN	BEN
1	(France) Monaco	6	3	2	1	4	1	+3	11	Advance to knockout phase	—	1–0	2–0	0–0
2	(Germany) Bayer Leverkusen	6	3	1	2	7	4	+3	10	Advance to knockout phase	0–1	—	2–0	3–1
3	(Russia) Zenit Saint Petersburg	6	2	1	3	4	6	−2	7	Transfer to Europa League	0–0	1–2	—	1–0
4	(Portugal) Benfica	6	1	2	3	2	6	−4	5		1–0	0–0	0–2	—

Source: UEFA
Rules for classification: Group stage tiebreakers

16 September 2014 1	Benfica (Portugal)	0–2	(Russia) Zenit Saint Petersburg	Lisbon, Portugal
19:45 WEST (UTC+01:00)	Artur (red card) 18'; Pereira (yellow card) 60'	Report	Hulk 5'; Witsel 22'; García (yellow card) 65'	Stadium: Estádio da Luz; Attendance: 35,294; Referee: Svein Oddvar Moen (Norway)

1 October 2014 2	Bayer Leverkusen (Germany)	3–1	(Portugal) Benfica	Leverkusen, Germany
20:45 CEST (UTC+02:00)	Kießling 25'; Son 34'; Hilbert (yellow card) 60'; Çalhanoğlu 64' (pen.); Öztunalı (yellow card) 90+2'	Report	Gaitán (yellow card) 22'; Pérez (yellow card) 54'; Luisão (yellow card) 58'; Salvio 62' (yellow card) 70'; Samaris (yellow card) 88'	Stadium: BayArena; Attendance: 25,202; Referee: Martin Atkinson (England)

22 October 2014 3	Monaco (France)	0–0	(Portugal) Benfica	Fontvieille, Monaco
20:45 CEST (UTC+02:00)	Carvalho (yellow card) 71'; Kurzawa (yellow card) 78'; Carrasco (yellow card) 90+5'	Report	Eliseu (yellow card) 8'; López (yellow card) 26' (red card) 76'; Salvio (yellow card) 36'	Stadium: Stade Louis II; Attendance: 12,776; Referee: Szymon Marciniak (Poland)

4 November 2014 4	Benfica (Portugal)	1–0	(France) Monaco	Lisbon, Portugal
19:45 WET (UTC±00:00)	Samaris (yellow card) 29'; Pérez (yellow card) 38'; Talisca 82'	Report	Traoré (yellow card) 26'; Carvalho (yellow card) 39'; Toulalan (yellow card) 56'; Moutinho (yellow card) 74'; Martial (yellow card) 86'	Stadium: Estádio da Luz; Attendance: 32,565; Referee: David Fernández Borbalán (Spain)

26 November 2014 5	Zenit Saint Petersburg (Russia)	1–0	(Portugal) Benfica	Saint Petersburg, Russia
20:00 MSK (UTC+03:00)	Neto (yellow card) 30'; Hulk (yellow card) 36'; Criscito (yellow card) 44'; Danny 79'	Report	Jardel (yellow card) 11'; Samaris (yellow card) 21'; Luisão (yellow card) 36' (yellow-red card) 90+2'	Stadium: Petrovsky Stadium; Attendance: 14,123; Referee: Nicola Rizzoli (Italy)

9 December 2014 6	Benfica (Portugal)	0–0	(Germany) Bayer Leverkusen	Lisbon, Portugal
19:45 WET (UTC±00:00)	Cristante (yellow card) 36'	Report	Boenisch (yellow card) 26'; Toprak (yellow card) 32' (yellow-red card) 90+1'	Stadium: Estádio da Luz; Attendance: 17,564; Referee: Aleksei Kulbakov (Belarus)

== Statistics ==
=== Squad statistics ===
No.	Pos	Nat	Player	Total		Primeira Liga		Taça de Portugal^{1}		Taça da Liga		UEFA Champions League	
No.	Pos	Nat	Player	Apps	Goals	Apps	Goals	Apps	Goals	Apps	Goals	Apps	Goals
1	GK	(Brazil) BRA	Artur	20	-10	12	-7	2	-2	3	0	3	-1
2	DF	(Argentina) ARG	Lisandro López	10	0	6	0	1	0	1	0	2	0
3	DF	(Portugal) POR	Steven Vitória	0	0	0	0	0	0	0	0	0	0
4	DF	(Brazil) BRA	Luisão	39	4	30	4	2	0	2	0	5	0
5	MF	(Serbia) SRB	Ljubomir Fejsa	6	1	5	1	0	0	1	0	0	0
6	MF	(Portugal) POR	Ruben Amorim	12	0	10	0	1	0	1	0	0	0
7	MF	(Greece) GRE	Andreas Samaris	37	0	28	0	1	0	3	0	5	0
8	FW	(Serbia) SRB	Miralem Sulejmani	8	0	4	0	0	0	4	0	0	0
9	FW	(Brazil) BRA	Derley	27	2	15	1	4	0	3	1	5	0
10	MF	(Argentina) ARG	Nicolás Gaitán	37	4	27	4	3	0	2	0	5	0
11	FW	(Brazil) BRA	Lima	44	19	34	19	2	0	2	0	6	0
13	GK	(Portugal) POR	Paulo Lopes	1	-1	0	0	0	0	0	0	1	-1
14	DF	(Uruguay) URU	Maxi Pereira	42	5	32	5	2	0	3	0	5	0
15	MF	(Netherlands) NED	Ola John	36	4	26	3	4	0	4	1	2	0
16	FW	(Portugal) POR	Nélson Oliveira	2	0	0	0	1	0	0	0	1	0
17	FW	(Brazil) BRA	Jonas	35	31	27	20	3	6	5	5	0	0
18	MF	(Argentina) ARG	Eduardo Salvio	38	13	29	9	2	2	2	1	5	1
19	DF	(Portugal) POR	Eliseu	33	4	26	4	1	0	3	0	3	0
20	GK	(Brazil) BRA	Júlio César	30	-17	23	-9	2	-3	2	-1	3	-4
21	MF	(Portugal) POR	Pizzi	31	4	23	2	2	0	5	2	1	0
22	FW	(Argentina) ARG	Franco Jara	2	0	2	0	0	0	0	0	0	0
23	DF	(Switzerland) SUI	Loris Benito	6	0	2	0	2	0	1	0	1	0
24	MF	(Italy) ITA	Bryan Cristante	15	1	5	0	3	0	4	1	3	0
25	FW	(Uruguay) URU	Jonathan Rodríguez	1	0	1	0	0	0	0	0	0	0
27	MF	(Germany) GER	Hany Mukhtar	1	0	1	0	0	0	0	0	0	0
28	DF	(Portugal) POR	Sílvio	4	0	1	0	0	0	3	0	0	0
30	MF	(Brazil) BRA	Talisca	44	11	32	9	3	0	3	1	6	1
32	FW	(Portugal) POR	Tiago	6	0	1	0	2	0	0	0	3	0
33	DF	(Brazil) BRA	Jardel	43	4	31	4	3	0	5	0	4	0
34	MF	(Portugal) POR	André Almeida	31	0	20	0	3	0	2	0	6	0
35	MF	(Argentina) ARG	Enzo Pérez	19	1	11	1	3	0	0	0	5	0
37	DF	(Brazil) BRA	César	8	1	3	0	2	1	1	0	2	0
78	FW	(Portugal) POR	Gonçalo Guedes (B)	9	0	5	0	1	0	3	0	0	0
83	FW	(Portugal) POR	Rui Fonte (B)	1	0	0	0	0	0	1	0	0	0
92	DF	(Sweden) SWE	Victor Lindelöf (B)	1	0	0	0	1	0	0	0	0	0
97	MF	(Portugal) POR	João Teixeira (B)	1	0	0	0	0	0	0	0	1	0

(B) – Benfica B player

Includes Supertaça Cândido de Oliveira

=== Goalscorers ===
Rnk	Pos	Player	League	Cup	League Cup	Champions League	Total
1	FW	(Brazil) Jonas	20	6	5	—	31
2	FW	(Brazil) Lima	19	0	0	0	19
3	MF	(Argentina) Eduardo Salvio	9	2	1	1	13
4	MF	(Brazil) Talisca	9	0	1	1	11
5	DF	(Uruguay) Maxi Pereira	5	0	0	0	5
6	MF	(Argentina) Nicolás Gaitán	4	0	0	0	4
6	DF	(Portugal) Eliseu	4	0	0	0	4
6	DF	(Brazil) Jardel	4	0	0	0	4
6	DF	(Brazil) Luisão	4	0	0	0	4
6	MF	(Portugal) Pizzi	2	0	2	0	4
6	MF	(Netherlands) Ola John	3	0	1	0	4
12	FW	(Brazil) Derley	1	0	1	0	2
13	MF	(Argentina) Enzo Pérez	1	0	0	0	1
13	MF	(Italy) Bryan Cristante	0	0	1	0	1
13	MF	(Serbia) Ljubomir Fejsa	1	0	0	0	1
Totals			86	8	12	2	108

=== Hat-tricks ===
Player	Against	Result	Date	Competition
(Brazil) Talisca	Vitória de Setúbal	5–0 (A)	12 September 2014	Primeira Liga
(Brazil) Jonas	Sporting da Covilhã	3–2 (A)	18 October 2014	Taça de Portugal

(H) – Home; (A) – Away

=== Clean sheets ===
Number of matches inside brackets.

Rnk	Player	League	Cup^{1}	League Cup	Champions League	Total
1	(Brazil) Júlio César	15 (23)	0 (2)	1 (2)	1(3)	17 (30)
2	(Brazil) Artur	6 (12*)	1 (2)	3 (3)	2 (3)	12 (20)
3	(Portugal) Paulo Lopes	—	—	—	0 (1)	0 (1)
Totals		21 (34)	1 (4)	4 (5)	3 (6)	29 (49)

^{1}Includes Supertaça Cândido de Oliveira

* Includes 1 shared match on Round 19 against Boavista.

=== Disciplinary record ===
N	P	Nat.	Name	League			Cup			League Cup			Champions League			Total			Notes
N	P	Nat.	Name	Yellow card	Second yellow card	Red card	Yellow card	Second yellow card	Red card	Yellow card	Second yellow card	Red card	Yellow card	Second yellow card	Red card	Yellow card	Second yellow card	Red card	Notes
4	DF	(Brazil)	Luisão	1		1				1				1		2	1	1	
2	DF	(Argentina)	Lisandro López	1									1		1	2		1	
1	GK	(Brazil)	Artur				1								1	1		1	
30	MF	(Brazil)	Talisca	6	1		1			1						8	1		
7	MF	(Greece)	Andreas Samaris	12									3			15			
14	DF	(Uruguay)	Maxi Pereira	11			1			1			2			15			
35	MF	(Argentina)	Enzo Pérez	5			1						2			8			Cup includes Super Cup
19	DF	(Portugal)	Eliseu	7									1			8			
34	DF	(Portugal)	André Almeida	7												7			
10	MF	(Argentina)	Nicolás Gaitán	6									1			7			
18	MF	(Argentina)	Eduardo Salvio	4			2									6			
17	FW	(Brazil)	Jonas	4			1			1						6			
20	GK	(Brazil)	Júlio César	4			1									5			
33	DF	(Brazil)	Jardel	3									1			4			
24	MF	(Italy)	Bryan Cristante							2			1			3			
37	DF	(Brazil)	César	2												2			
9	FW	(Brazil)	Derley							2						2			
5	MF	(Serbia)	Ljubomir Fejsa	2												2			
15	MF	(Netherlands)	Ola John							2						2			
22	FW	(Argentina)	Franco Jara	1												1			
28	DF	(Portugal)	Sílvio							1						1			
78	FW	(Portugal)	Gonçalo Guedes	1												1			
21	MF	(Portugal)	Pizzi	1												1			
6	MF	(Portugal)	Ruben Amorim	1												1			

Source: LPFP and competitions above.
Ordered by (red card) , (second yellow card) and (yellow card)
(yellow card) = Number of bookings; (second yellow card) = Number of sending offs after a second yellow card; (red card) = Number of sending offs by a direct red card.

== Awards ==
No.	Pos	Name	Award	Month	Ref
30	MF	(Brazil) Talisca	SJPF Player of the Month	August 2014	
30	MF	(Brazil) Talisca	SJPF Player of the Month	September 2014	
17	FW	(Brazil) Jonas	SJPF Player of the Month	February 2015	
17	FW	(Brazil) Jonas	SJPF Player of the Month	April 2015	
17	FW	(Brazil) Jonas	LPFP Primeira Liga Player of the Year	—	
20	GK	(Brazil) Júlio César	LPFP Primeira Liga Best Goalkeeper	—	
—	—	(Portugal) Jorge Jesus	LPFP Primeira Liga Best Coach	—	
