= 2015 Valais Cup =

Valais Football Summer Cups

Tournament details
- Host country: Switzerland; France
- Teams: 5
- Venue: 4 (in 4 host cities)

Final positions
- Champions: (Switzerland) Sion (1st title)
- Runners-up: (Ukraine) Shakhtar Donetsk
- Third place: (Netherlands) PSV Eindhoven
- Fourth place: (Switzerland) Basel

Tournament statistics
- Matches played: 5
- Goals scored: 17 (3.4 per match)

The 2015 Valais Cup was an international football tournament that is part of the Valais Football Summer Cups. Matches were played in July in Switzerland and France. It was the third running of the competition, following the 2014 edition. The tournament consisted of four matchdays for a total of five matches.

== Participants ==
The tournament features European top-clubs:

- (France) Lyon
- (Netherlands) PSV Eindhoven
- (Switzerland) Basel
- (Switzerland) Sion
- (Ukraine) Shakhtar Donetsk

== Results ==
Pos	Team	Pld	W	D	L	GF	GA	GD	Pts
1	(Switzerland) Sion (C)	2	2	0	0	4	2	+2	6
2	(Ukraine) Shakhtar Donetsk	2	1	0	1	5	4	+1	3
3	(Netherlands) PSV Eindhoven	2	1	0	1	4	3	+1	3
4	(Switzerland) Basel	2	1	0	1	4	5	−1	3
5	(France) Lyon	2	0	0	2	0	3	−3	0

Updated to match(es) played on 11 July 2015. Source: Valais Cup
(C) Champions
7 July 2015
19:00

Sion (Switzerland)	3–2	(Ukraine) Shakhtar Donetsk
Ziegler 22'; Salatic 37' (pen.); Konate 41'		Teixeira 23', 45+1'

Stade St-Germain, Savièse (Switzerland)
Attendance: 1,500
Referee: Sascha Amhof (Switzerland)

9 July 2015
19:00

Basel (Switzerland)	1–3	(Ukraine) Shakhtar Donetsk
Janko 5'		Hladkyy 33', 70'; Marlos 85'

Stade du Christ-Roi, Lens (Switzerland)
Attendance: 1,200
Referee: Stephan Klossner (Switzerland)

11 July 2015
17:00

PSV Eindhoven (Netherlands)	2–3	(Switzerland) Basel
Bergwijn 37'; Narsingh 81'		Gashi 23' (pen.); Embolo 45+2'; Callà 90+3'

Stadion FC Solothurn, Solothurn (Switzerland)
Attendance: 1,950
Referee: Adrien Jaccottet (Switzerland)

11 July 2015
19:45

Sion (Switzerland)	1–0	(France) Lyon
Carlitos 22'

Stade St-Germain, Savièse (Switzerland)
Attendance: 4,050

15 July 2015
19:30

Lyon (France)	0–2	(Netherlands) PSV Eindhoven
		Locadia 76' (pen.), 88'

Stade Forestier, Aix-les-Bains (France)
