= 2014 Supertaça Cândido de Oliveira =

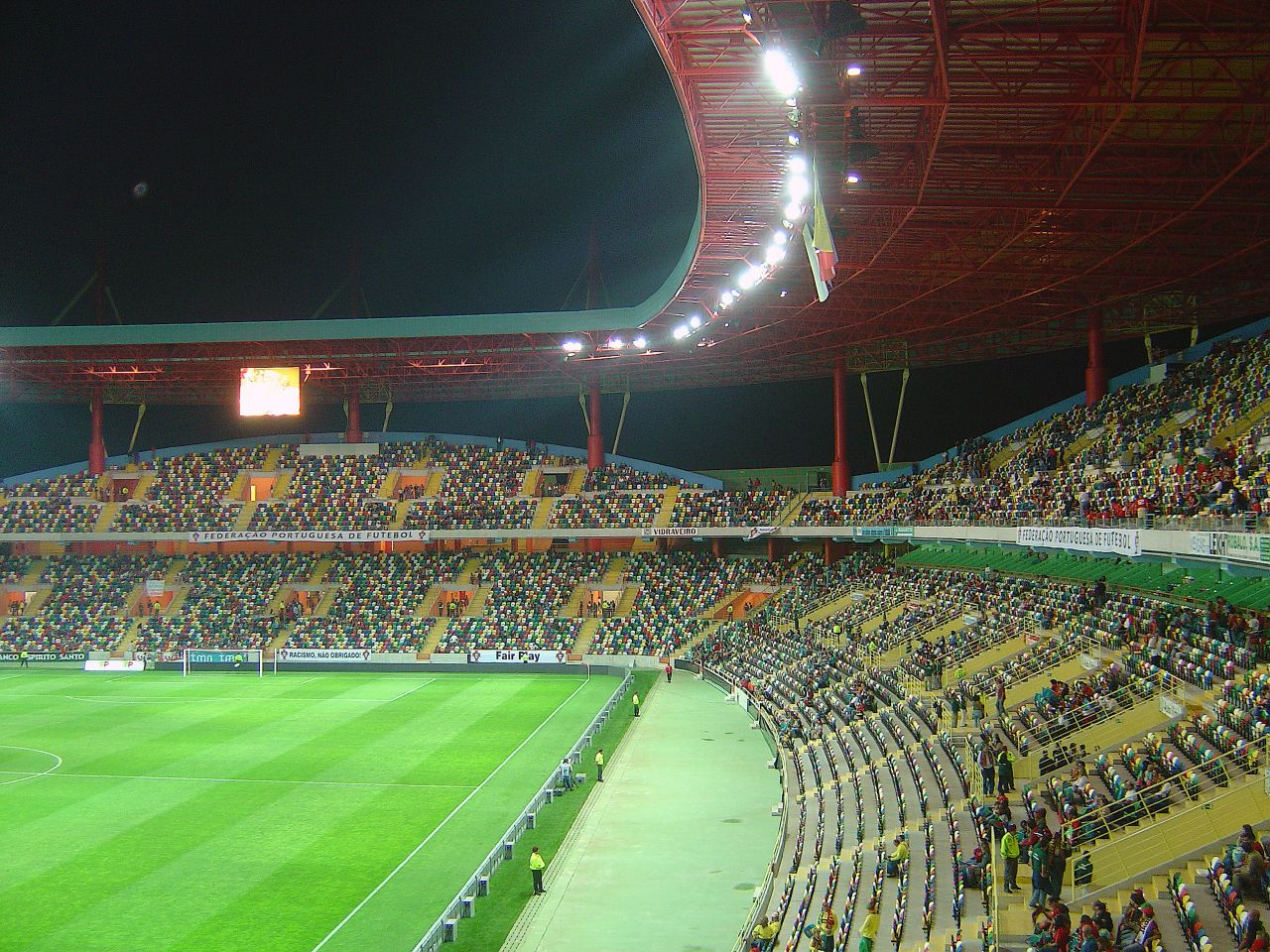
- The Estádio Municipal de Aveiro hosted the Supertaça
- Event: Supertaça Cândido de Oliveira (Portuguese Super Cup)
Benfica	Rio Ave
0	0
- after extra time Benfica won 3–2 on penalties.
- Date: 10 August 2014
- Venue: Estádio Municipal de Aveiro, Aveiro
- Man of the Match: Enzo Pérez (Benfica)
- Referee: Duarte Gomes
- Attendance: 29,895

The 2014 Supertaça Cândido de Oliveira was the 36th edition of the Supertaça Cândido de Oliveira. It featured the winners of the 2013–14 Primeira Liga and 2013–14 Taça de Portugal, S.L. Benfica, and the runners-up of the Taça de Portugal, Rio Ave F.C. The two clubs also met in the 2014 Taça da Liga Final, also won by Benfica.

Benfica featured in their 16th Super Cup and Rio Ave played in the fixture for the first time.

The game finished goalless after extra time, and Benfica won 3–2 on penalties for their fifth Supertaça victory, achieving a Portuguese record of all four domestic titles won in a year.

== Background ==
Benfica's last appearance was in 2010, where the Portuguese champions lost to 2009–10 Taça de Portugal holders Porto 2–0, also at the Estádio Municipal de Aveiro. In 15 Supertaça appearances prior to 2014, Benfica won 4, in 1980, 1985, 1989 and 2005. Rio Ave made their first Supertaça appearance.

In Benfica's and Rio Ave's entire history, the two teams had met on 47 different occasions. Benfica had obtained 35 victories, while Rio Ave had won 3 times, with 9 encounters ending in a draw. Before the Supertaça, the last meeting between both sides was in the domestic cup final, on 18 May 2014, with Benfica defeating Rio Ave 1–0 at the Estádio do Jamor. A first-half strike from Argentine winger Nicolás Gaitán granted Benfica a 25th cup trophy which would cap off a treble-winning season for the club.

== Match ==
=== Details ===
10 August 2014
20:45 WEST (UTC+01:00)

Benfica	0–0 (a.e.t.)	Rio Ave
Penalties
Derley (penalty missed); Lima (penalty scored); Bebé (penalty scored); Luisão (penalty scored)	3–2	(penalty missed) Tarantini; (penalty scored) Filipe Augusto; (penalty scored) Ukra; (penalty missed) Diego Lopes; (penalty missed) Tiago Pinto

Estádio Municipal de Aveiro, Aveiro
Attendance: 29,895
Referee: Duarte Gomes

Benfica	Rio Ave

GK	1	(Brazil) Artur
RB	14	(Uruguay) Maxi Pereira
CB	4	(Brazil) Luisão (c)
CB	33	(Brazil) Jardel
LB	19	(Portugal) Eliseu
DM	6	(Portugal) Ruben Amorim
DM	35	(Argentina) Enzo Pérez	(yellow card) 44'
RM	18	(Argentina) Eduardo Salvio		(substituted off) 106'
AM	30	(Brazil) Talisca		(substituted off) 69'
LW	10	(Argentina) Nico Gaitán		(substituted off) 100'
CF	11	(Brazil) Lima
Substitutes:
GK	13	(Portugal) Paulo Lopes
DF	34	(Portugal) André Almeida
DF	37	(Brazil) César
MF	15	(Netherlands) Ola John		(substituted on) 100'
FW	9	(Brazil) Derley		(substituted on) 69'
FW	22	(Argentina) Franco Jara
FW	32	(Portugal) Bebé		(substituted on) 106'
Manager:
(Portugal) Jorge Jesus

GK	1	(Brazil) Cássio	(yellow card) 110'
RB	16	(Portugal) Nuno Lopes		(substituted off) 88'
CB	46	(Brazil) Marcelo
CB	3	(France) Prince
LB	15	(Portugal) Tiago Pinto	(yellow card) 53'
DM	8	(Portugal) Tarantini (c)
CM	20	(Portugal) Pedro Moreira		(substituted off) 55'
CM	7	(Brazil) Filipe Augusto	(yellow card) 80'
RW	17	(Portugal) Ukra
LW	29	(Venezuela) Yonathan Del Valle
CF	9	(Egypt) Ahmed Hassan		(substituted off) 55'
Substitutes:
GK	93	(Brazil) Ederson
DF	25	(Portugal) Roderick
DF	14	(Portugal) André Vilas Boas
DF	30	(Ghana) Alhassan Wakaso		(substituted on) 80'
MF	10	(Brazil) Diego Lopes	(yellow card) 90'	(substituted on) 55'
MF	11	(Belarus) Renan Bressan
FW	13	(Ghana) Emmanuel Boateng		(substituted on) 55'
Manager:
(Portugal) Pedro Martins

Man of the Match:
(Argentina) Enzo Pérez (Benfica)

Assistant referees:
Ricardo Santos
Venâncio Tomé
Fourth official:
Luís Ferreira

Match rules:

- 90 minutes.
- 30 minutes of extra-time if necessary.
- Penalty shoot-out if still tied.
- Maximum of three substitutions.

== Broadcasting ==
Once again, RTP broadcast the Supertaça on television and radio (RTP1 and Antena 1, respectively), doing it for the fourth consecutive year. As in previous years, an HD broadcast was available on 1080i resolution on RTP HD, which was available on most pay-TV providers.

== See also ==
- 2014–15 Primeira Liga
- 2014–15 Taça de Portugal
- 2014–15 Taça da Liga
- 2014–15 S.L. Benfica season
