= Ola John =

Dutch association football player

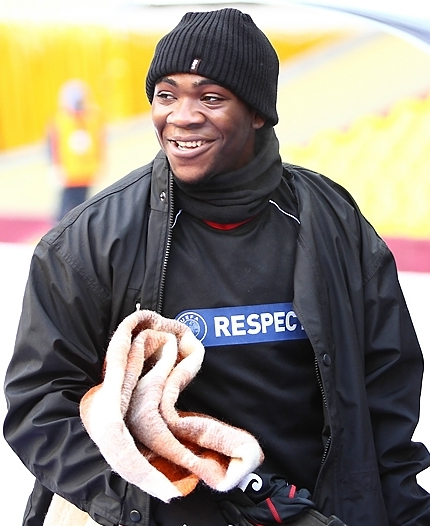
- John with Twente in 2011

Personal information
- Full name: Ola John
- Date of birth: 19 May 1992 (age 34)
- Place of birth: Zwedru, Liberia
- Height: 1.80 m (5 ft 11 in)
- Position: Left winger

Team information
- Current team: Al-Arabi
- Number: 11

Youth career
- 1998–2002: DES Nijverdal
- 2002–2010: Twente

Senior career*
Years	Team	Apps	(Gls)
2010–2012	Twente	46	(9)
2012–2018	Benfica	55	(3)
2014	→ Hamburger SV (loan)	8	(0)
2015–2016	→ Reading (loan)	28	(4)
2016–2017	→ Wolverhampton Wanderers (loan)	2	(0)
2017	→ Deportivo La Coruña (loan)	11	(0)
2018	Benfica B	1	(1)
2018–2020	Vitória Guimarães	42	(1)
2020–2021	RKC Waalwijk	23	(2)
2021–2023	Al-Hazem	55	(26)
2023–	Al-Arabi	23	(8)

International career^{‡}
2009	Netherlands U17	3	(1)
2010–2011	Netherlands U19	9	(3)
2011–2014	Netherlands U21	15	(1)
2013	Netherlands	1	(0)
- * Club domestic league appearances and goals as of 09:39, 28 March 2024 (UTC) ‡ National team caps and goals as of 6 February 2014

Ola John (born 19 May 1992) is a professional footballer who plays for Al-Arabi as a left winger. Born in Liberia, he has represented the Netherlands national team.

A product of FC Twente's youth system, he played with their first team from 2010 to 2012 before joining S.L. Benfica. Amid a 2014 loan to Hamburger SV for half a season, he played regularly at Benfica in the seasons of 2012–13 and 2014–15. Afterwards, he was loaned out to Reading, Wolverhampton Wanderers and Deportivo de La Coruña. After playing only one match with Benfica's reserve team in 2017–18, he moved to Vitória for the upcoming season.

Internationally, John gained one cap for the Netherlands national team in 2013.

== Club career ==
=== Twente ===
The 2011–12 season was the big breakthrough for John at Twente, as he got a starting place from Co Adriaanse at the start of the season, and did not lose that even with competition for the left forward position, as Nacer Chadli returned from injury. He also topped the UEFA Europa League group stage assist rankings with six assists. In Twente's home match in the Europa League against Odense BK on 3 November, John provided all three assists in a 3–2 win. John was influential in the Eredivisie campaign as well, netting two goals in a 6–2 victory over FC Utrecht on 4 December 2011.

=== Benfica and loans ===
On 24 May 2012, John signed for Portuguese club Benfica on a five-year deal which included a €45 million release clause for a transfer fee of €9.1 million according to Football Leaks. It was rumoured that 80% of the undisclosed went to sports investment company Doyen Sports. After struggling to find his space in the first team during his initial months in Lisbon, John became a regular starter or used substitute in the second half of Benfica's 2012–13 campaign, which included appearances in UEFA Europa League and Portuguese Cup finals.

He was loaned to Hamburger SV for the remainder of the 2013–14 season on 17 January 2014. He stayed at Benfica for the new season, scoring his first league goal on 12 September 2014 against Vitória Sétubal. On 5 October, he gave two assists in a 4–0 home win against Arouca in Portuguese league. On 29 May 2015, John scored the winning goal against Marítimo (2–1) in the league cup final.

On 1 September 2015, John was loaned out to Football League Championship side Reading for one season. Reading had an option to sign him on a permanent deal at the end of the loan spell. He scored his first goal for Reading in the home match against Huddersfield Town on 3 November 2015. On 22 August 2016, John returned to the Championship, to join Wolverhampton Wanderers on a season-long loan.

After an injury-ridden loan spell at Wolves, limiting his game time to a total of 71 minutes in all competitions, his loan was cut short on 13 January 2017 and he instead joined Deportivo de La Coruña on loan until the end of the season. In August 2017, it was reported that Ola John refused to be loaned to Panathinaikos and to Qarabağ.

=== Vitória de Guimarães ===
On 21 July 2018, John signed a three-year contract with Vitória S.C. in Primeira Liga.

=== Al-Arabi ===
On 4 June 2023, John joined Saudi First Division side Al-Arabi.

== International career ==
In February 2012, John was called up for the first time by Bert van Marwijk to represent the senior Netherlands football team for the game against England at Wembley. On 7 May 2012, he was named in the provisional list of 36 players for the UEFA Euro 2012 tournament, one of nine uncapped players to be chosen by Netherlands manager Bert van Marwijk as part of the preliminary squad. On 6 February 2013, John made his debut, appearing as a starter in the 1:1 draw with Italy in a friendly match.

== Personal life ==
As a two-year-old, John fled with his mother and brothers from Liberia to the Netherlands. His father was killed during the First Liberian Civil War. He did not return to the African continent until the U-17 World Championship in Nigeria in 2009. As a child, he played at the amateur club VV DES in Nijverdal. Like his brothers Collins and Paddy, Ola joined the youth academy of Twente.

== Career statistics ==
As of match played 1 July 2019

Club	Season	League			Cup (Note: Includes Johan Cruijff-schaal XVI and Supertaça Cândido de Oliveira.)		League Cup		Europe		Total	
Club	Season	Division	Apps	Goals	Apps	Goals	Apps	Goals	Apps	Goals	Apps	Goals
Twente	2010–11	Eredivisie	13	1	3	0	—		3	0	19	1
Twente	2011–12	Eredivisie	33	8	3	0	—		14	1	50	9
Twente	Total		46	9	6	0	—		17	1	69	10
Benfica	2012–13	Primeira Liga	22	0	4	2	4	0	12	2	42	4
Benfica	2013–14	Primeira Liga	5	0	1	1	1	0	2	0	9	1
Benfica	2014–15	Primeira Liga	26	3	3	0	4	1	2	0	35	4
Benfica	2015–16	Primeira Liga	2	0	1	0	0	0	0	0	3	0
Benfica	Total		55	3	9	3	9	1	16	2	89	9
Hamburger SV (loan)	2013–14	Bundesliga	8	0	1	0	—		—		9	0
Reading (loan)	2015–16	Championship	28	4	4	0	1	0	—		33	4
Wolverhampton Wanderers (loan)	2016–17	Championship	2	0	0	0	1	0	—		3	0
Deportivo La Coruña (loan)	2016–17	La Liga	11	0	—		—		—		11	0
Benfica B	2017–18	Segunda Liga	1	1	—		—		—		1	1
Vitória Guimarães	2018–19	Primeira Liga	26	1	1	1	0	0	—		28	1
Vitória Guimarães	2019–20	Primeira Liga	0	0	0	0	0	0	—		0	0
Vitória Guimarães	Total		26	1	1	1	0	0	—		28	1
Career total			177	18	21	3	12	1	33	3	243	24

== Honours ==
Twente

- KNVB Cup: 2010–11
- Johan Cruijff Shield: 2011

Benfica

- Primeira Liga: 2013–14, 2014–15, 2015–16
- Taça de Portugal: 2013–14
- Taça da Liga: 2013–14, 2014–15
- Supertaça Cândido de Oliveira: 2014
- UEFA Europa League runner-up: 2012–13
