= Jardel (footballer, born 1986) =

Brazilian footballer

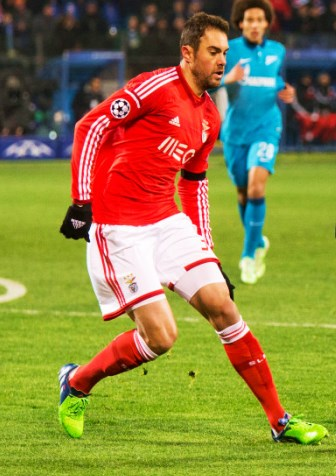
- Jardel playing for Benfica in 2014

Personal information
- Full name: Jardel Nivaldo Vieira
- Date of birth: 29 March 1986 (age 40)
- Place of birth: Florianópolis, Brazil
- Height: 1.92 m (6 ft 4 in)
- Position: Centre-back

Youth career
- 2002–2004: Avaí
- 2005: Vitória

Senior career*
Years	Team	Apps	(Gls)
2004	Avaí	0	(0)
2005	Vitória	12	(0)
2006	Santos	0	(0)
2007	Iraty		
2007	→ Avaí (loan)		(1)
2008–2010	Desportivo Brasil	0	(0)
2008	→ Joinville (loan)		
2009	→ Ituano (loan)	0	(0)
2009–2010	→ Estoril (loan)	28	(2)
2010–2011	Olhanense	16	(1)
2011–2021	Benfica	165	(11)
2012–2013	Benfica B	7	(1)
- * Club domestic league appearances and goals

Jardel Nivaldo Vieira (born 29 March 1986), simply known as Jardel, is a Brazilian retired professional footballer who played for as a central defender.

He spent most of his career at Benfica, having joined from Olhanense for €500,000 in January 2011, and became captain in September 2018. He made 288 appearances for the club and won 15 honours, including five Primeira Liga titles.

== Career ==
=== Early career ===
Born in Florianópolis, Santa Catarina, Jardel was an Avaí FC youth graduate. Signing his first professional contract at the age of only 16, being promoted to the first team.

In March 2005, Jardel joined Esporte Clube Vitória, winning the year's Campeonato Baiano while at the club. After suffering relegation from Campeonato Brasileiro Série B, he signed for Santos FC on 15 January 2006.

Jardel left Peixe in December 2006 after making no appearances and struggling severely with injuries. He subsequently represented Iraty Sport Club, Avaí, Joinville Esporte Clube, Ituano FC and Desportivo Brasil before moving abroad.

In 2009, Jardel moved to Portugal, where he would remain in the following years. He played one season with G.D. Estoril Praia in the second division where he only missed two league games, then signed with S.C. Olhanense in the top level on a one-year deal. He made 19 total appearances in his half-season on the Algarve, scoring in a 3–1 win over Vitória de Setúbal on 2 October 2010 to put the team into second place.

=== Benfica ===
In January 2011, Jardel joined Portuguese club S.L. Benfica for a €500,000 transfer fee, replacing Chelsea-bound David Luiz. After two months of sporadic appearances, then manager Jorge Jesus dropped Sidnei and immediately inserted Jardel into the first team's starting lineup. On 28 April, he scored his first goal for the Lisbon side, in a 2–1 home win against S.C Braga for the campaign's UEFA Europa League semi-finals (2–2 aggregate loss), He finished his first season with 16 appearances and won his first piece of silverware; on 1 May on his return to the Estádio José Arcanjo in Olhão, he was sent off in a 1–1 draw.

The following season, Jardel made 18 appearances, serving mostly as backup to Luisão and Ezequiel Garay. He started the 2012–13 season with Benfica's reserves in division two. After Luisão's two-month suspension, however, he was propelled directly into the first team's starting XI. During the 2013–14 season, like his 2011–12 season, he made 18 appearances, serving backup to Luisão and Garay. However, he enjoyed success as the club won the domestic treble.

After the departure of Ezequiel Garay to Zenit Saint Petersburg, Jardel became a mainstay in Benfica's starting lineup. On 4 January 2015, Jardel scored his first goal for Benfica in the Primeira Liga, away at F.C. Penafiel (0–3). On 8 February 2015, Jardel scored a crucial last-minute goal to tie the Lisbon derby (1–1) in the Primeira Liga. He helped the club win their second straight Primeira Liga and Taça da Liga

In the 2015–16 season, Jardel enjoyed his best ever season, appearing in 44 games and scoring 5 goals. He played alongside three different centre-backs, Luisão, Lisandro López and Victor Lindelöf, during the variation of the season. He scored the winner against Vitória de Setúbal (2–1) at the Estádio da Luz in the first half, securing Benfica's lead in the Primeira Liga. For the third straight season, he won the Primeira Liga and Taça da Liga.

Jardel's 2016–17 season was injury plagued, picking up a series of nagging injuries throughout the campaign. In the following season, he regained his starting position after the departure of Lindelöf to Manchester United. On 3 February 2018, he made his 200th appearance for the club and was elected man of the match after a goal and assist in a 5–1 home win against Rio Ave.

In September 2018, Jardel became club captain upon the retirement of long-serving compatriot Luisão, and extended his contract by a further year to 2021. He played 19 games as the Eagles regained the title from FC Porto on the last day, including one with a straight red card for elbowing Arsénio in a 3–1 home loss to Moreirense F.C. on 2 November.

Benfica announced in June 2021 that they would let Jardel's contract expire at the start of the new month, after 288 official appearances.

== Personal life ==
Jardel acquired Portuguese citizenship in 2016.

== Career statistics ==
As of match played 21 March 2021

Appearances and goals by club, season and competition
Club	Season	League			National cup		League cup		Continental		Other		Total	
Club	Season	Division	Apps	Goals	Apps	Goals	Apps	Goals	Apps	Goals	Apps	Goals	Apps	Goals
Vitória	2005	Série B	12	0	0	0	—		—		0	0	12	0
Santos	2006	Série A	0	0	0	0	—		—		0	0	0	0
Desportivo Brasil	2009	Paulista Segunda Divisão	—		—		—		—		6 (Note: Appearance(s) in Campeonato Paulista Segunda Divisão)	1	6	1
Ituano (loan)	2009	Série D	0	0	—		—		—		1 (Note: Appearance(s) in Campeonato Paulista)	0	1	0
Estoril (loan)	2009–10	Segunda Liga	28	2	0	0	6	0	—		—		34	2
Olhanense	2010–11	Primeira Liga	16	1	1	0	2	0	—		—		19	1
Benfica	2010–11	Primeira Liga	8	0	2	0	1	0	5 (Note: Appearance(s) in UEFA Europa League)	1	—		16	1
Benfica	2011–12	Primeira Liga	10	0	1	0	4	0	3 (Note: Appearance(s) in UEFA Champions League)	0	—		18	0
Benfica	2012–13	Primeira Liga	16	0	4	0	4	0	10 (Note: Five appearances in UEFA Champions League, five appearances and one goal in UEFA Europa League)	1	—		34	1
Benfica	2013–14	Primeira Liga	6	0	2	0	4	0	1	0	—		13	0
Benfica	2014–15	Primeira Liga	31	4	3	0	5	0	4	0	1 (Note: Appearance in Supertaça Cândido de Oliveira)	0	43	4
Benfica	2015–16	Primeira Liga	30	3	2	1	2	1	9	0	1	0	44	5
Benfica	2016–17	Primeira Liga	1	0	3	0	4	0	0	0	0	0	8	0
Benfica	2017–18	Primeira Liga	26	2	2	0	1	0	4	0	1	0	34	2
Benfica	2018–19	Primeira Liga	19	2	4	0	4	0	10 (Note: Eight appearances and one goal in UEFA Champions League, two appearances in UEFA Europa League)	1	—		37	3
Benfica	2019–20	Primeira Liga	10	0	4	0	3	0	2	0	0	0	19	0
Benfica	2020–21	Primeira Liga	8	0	4	0	2	0	4	0	0	0	18	0
Benfica	Total		165	11	31	1	34	1	52	3	3	0	285	16
Career total			221	14	32	1	42	1	52	3	10	1	355	20

== Honours ==
Benfica

- Primeira Liga: 2013–14, 2014–15, 2015–16, 2016–17, 2018–19
- Taça de Portugal: 2013–14, 2016–17
- Taça da Liga: 2010–11, 2011–12, 2013–14, 2014–15, 2015–16
- Supertaça Cândido de Oliveira: 2014, 2017, 2019
- UEFA Europa League runner-up: 2012–13, 2013–14

Individual

- Florianópolis City Council Medal of Sports Merit
