= Djavan (footballer) =

Brazilian footballer (born 1987)

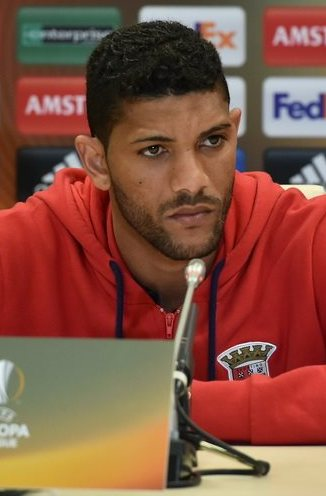
- Djavan with Braga in 2016

Personal information
- Full name: Djavan da Silva Ferreira
- Date of birth: 31 December 1987 (age 38)
- Place of birth: Serrinha, Brazil
- Height: 1.84 m (6 ft 0 in)
- Position: Left-back

Senior career*
Years	Team	Apps	(Gls)
2012	Astro	0	(0)
2012	→ Feirense-BA (loan)	0	(0)
2013	Feirense-BA	3	(0)
2013	Corithians-AL	0	(0)
2013	→ CRB (loan)	2	(0)
2013–2014	→ Académica (loan)	27	(1)
2014	Benfica	0	(0)
2014–2017	Braga	48	(0)
2014	Braga B	2	(0)
2017−2019	Chaves	46	(1)
2019–2020	Moreirense	10	(0)
2021	Jacuipense	11	(0)
2022	Real Noroeste	23	(0)
2023	Nova Venécia	5	(0)
2023	Alagoinhas	8	(0)
2024	Real Noroeste	17	(0)
Total		202	(2)
- * Club domestic league appearances and goals

Djavan da Silva Ferreira (born 31 December 1987), known simply as Djavan, is a Brazilian former professional footballer who played as a left-back.

== Club career ==
Born in Serrinha, Bahia, Djavan only played lower league football in his country, starting out at Feirense Futebol Clube in 2012. On 11 July 2013, he was loaned by Sport Club Corinthians Alagoano to Portuguese Primeira Liga club Académica de Coimbra. He made his debut in the competition on 18 August, starting in a 2–0 away loss against Gil Vicente FC.

On 6 June 2014, fellow top-division side S.L. Benfica signed Djavan to a four-year deal. On 2 August, without having played any competitive games, he moved to S.C. Braga for four years on a €1 million transfer fee. He first appeared in the league on 13 September, featuring the full 90 minutes in a 1–0 defeat at F.C. Arouca. During his first season he battled for position with Tiago Gomes, ending with 23 official matches.

On 1 June 2015, in the final of the Taça de Portugal, Djavan won a penalty after an irregular tackle from Cédric Soares, which was converted by Eder for the first goal of the game, but Braga eventually lost to Sporting CP in a penalty shootout after a 2–2 draw in regular time.

== Honours ==
Braga

- Taça de Portugal: 2015–16
