= Eliseu =

Portuguese footballer (born 1983)

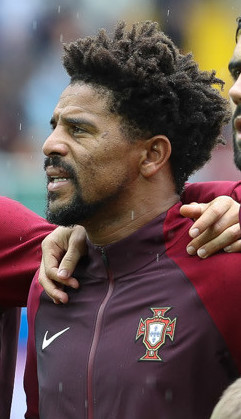
- Eliseu with Portugal in 2017

Personal information
- Full name: Eliseu Pereira dos Santos
- Date of birth: 1 October 1983 (age 43)
- Place of birth: Angra do Heroísmo, Portugal
- Height: 1.76 m (5 ft 9 in)
- Positions: Left-back; winger

Youth career
- 1994–2001: Marítimo Angra
- 2001–2002: Belenenses

Senior career*
Years	Team	Apps	(Gls)
2002–2007	Belenenses	52	(3)
2005–2006	→ Varzim (loan)	15	(3)
2007–2009	Málaga	74	(10)
2009–2010	Lazio	2	(0)
2010	→ Zaragoza (loan)	21	(2)
2010–2014	Málaga	116	(9)
2014–2018	Benfica	75	(4)
Total		355	(31)

International career
2004	Portugal U20	2	(1)
2004	Portugal U21	2	(0)
2009	Portugal B	1	(1)
2009–2017	Portugal	29	(1)
Medal record
Men's football
Representing Portugal
UEFA European Championship
Winner	2016 France
FIFA Confederations Cup
Third place	2017 Russia
- * Club domestic league appearances and goals

Eliseu Pereira dos Santos ComM (born 1 October 1983), known simply as Eliseu (Portuguese pronunciation: [eliˈzew]), is a Portuguese former professional footballer who played either as a left-back or left winger.

After starting out at Belenenses, he went on to spend most of his career with Málaga after signing in 2007, appearing in 214 official games and scoring 27 goals in two separate spells. In 2014 he signed with Benfica, with whom he won three consecutive Primeira Liga titles among other major trophies over four seasons.

A full international since 2009, Eliseu was part of the Portugal national squad that won Euro 2016.

== Early life ==
Eliseu was born in Angra do Heroísmo, Azores to a Cape Verdean mother, Inês Furtado (a restaurant owner), and a Portuguese father, José (an ambulance driver). The couple divorced when he was a teenager.

== Club career ==
=== Belenenses ===
Eliseu moved to Portugal's mainland in 2002, moving from Sport Clube Marítimo de Angra do Heroísmo to C.F. Os Belenenses. He gradually broke into the Lisbon-based club's first team, appearing in 24 Primeira Liga games in his second season and scoring in a 4–0 home win against C.F. Estrela da Amadora on 7 September 2003; his first had come in his only appearance of 2002–03, to close the 1–1 draw with Vitória de Setúbal after just one minute on the pitch.

After a loan with Varzim S.C. in the Segunda Liga, where he was banned for eight months after a positive doping test, Eliseu continued to be a relatively important attacking player for Belenenses, but was used mainly as a substitute.

=== Málaga ===
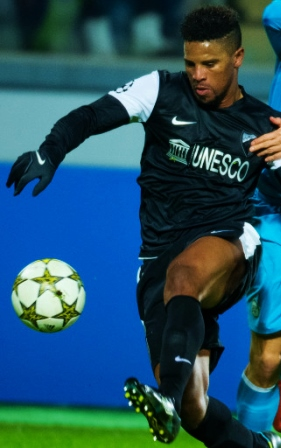
Eliseu playing for Málaga in 2012

For 2007–08, Eliseu and his compatriots Hélder Rosário and Paulo Jorge moved to Málaga CF, helping the Andalusians to return to La Liga after a two-year absence, with the trio combining for 108 matches and six goals (three from Eliseu). The following campaign, he continued to be first-choice, scoring his first Spanish top flight goal(s) in a 4–0 away victory over neighbours Recreativo de Huelva on 5 October 2008. He also found the net the following month, but in a 4–3 loss at Real Madrid.

On 25 June 2009, Eliseu joined S.S. Lazio in Italy for exactly €1 million. However, after receiving few opportunities, he moved to Real Zaragoza on 7 January of the following year, on loan until the end of the season. He scored in only his second match for the Aragonese, who lost 4–2 at Villarreal CF.

After contributing to Zaragoza avoiding relegation – he also scored in the last fixture, a 35-yard free kick against the same opponents, in a 3–3 home draw– Eliseu returned to La Rosaleda Stadium. Subsequently, he became teammate of fellow Portuguese Duda.

Eliseu started 2010–11 firmly established in the starting XI. On 27 September 2010, he scored from 25 meters against Villarreal to open the score but, minutes later, he headbutted Carlos Marchena and was sent off in an eventual 2–3 home loss; as his suspension was lifted, he was able to appear in the next fixture at UD Almería, but he again received his marching orders after elbowing Juan Manuel Ortiz in the 1–1 draw.

Eliseu was a regular starter when available, netting in a 4–1 home win over Racing de Santander on 5 December 2010 from a volley and also providing two assists to Salomón Rondón. Following the arrival of Manuel Pellegrini, who replaced the dismissed Jesualdo Ferreira, he was mostly used as a left-back.

After the signing of Nacho Monreal, Eliseu played in the midfield more often than not. On 3 October 2012, he scored a brace in a 3–0 away victory against Anderlecht in the group stage of the UEFA Champions League, the first coming from 20 meters and the second through a lob over the goalkeeper.

=== Benfica ===
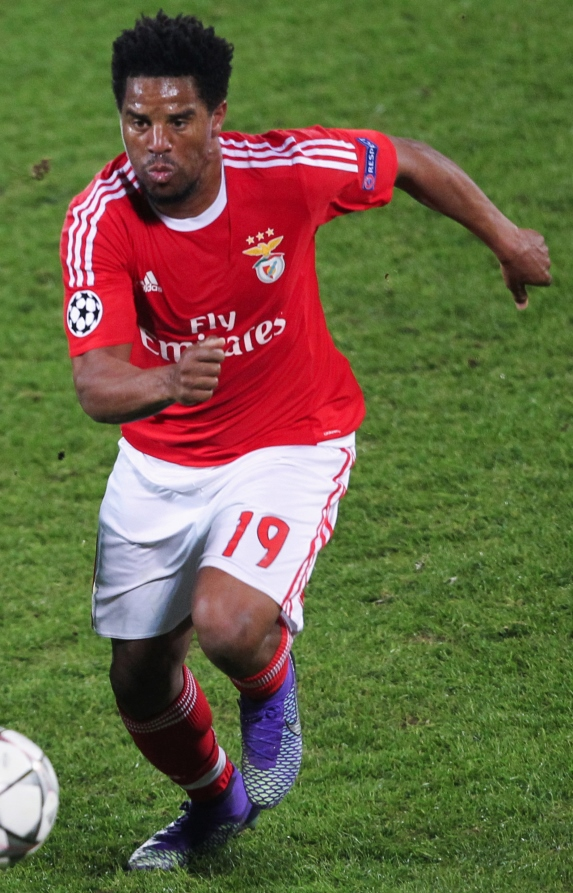
Eliseu with Benfica in 2016

On 24 July 2014, Eliseu signed for Portuguese champions S.L. Benfica for an undisclosed fee rumoured to be around €1.5 million, on a two-year deal with the option for a further one. He was reunited at the club with former Belenenses coach Jorge Jesus, who had previously tried to acquire his services.

Eliseu made his official debut on 10 August 2014, playing the full 120 minutes as a left-back in a penalty shootout win against Rio Ave F.C. in the Supertaça Cândido de Oliveira (0–0 draw). He scored his first goal for his new team with a strike from outside the box, which ended up being the winner at Boavista FC's artificial turf. His second came on 21 September also in the league, striking from 30 meters in a 3–1 home defeat of Moreirense FC.

On 21 February 2015, Eliseu also scored from long range against Moreirense in the league (3–1 away win). He ended the campaign with 33 games in all competitions, as Benfica won the national championship for the second time in a row.

It was reported by Portuguese press in December 2017 that Eliseu had been told by manager Rui Vitória that he would be released at the turn of the year. This did not happen, but in March it was confirmed that his contract would not be renewed once it expired at the end of the campaign.

Already retired, Eliseu returned to the Estádio da Luz in May 2019 to celebrate the team's league win by driving around the pitch on his scooter, wearing sunglasses at night; he had marked the victory two years prior in the same way.

== International career ==
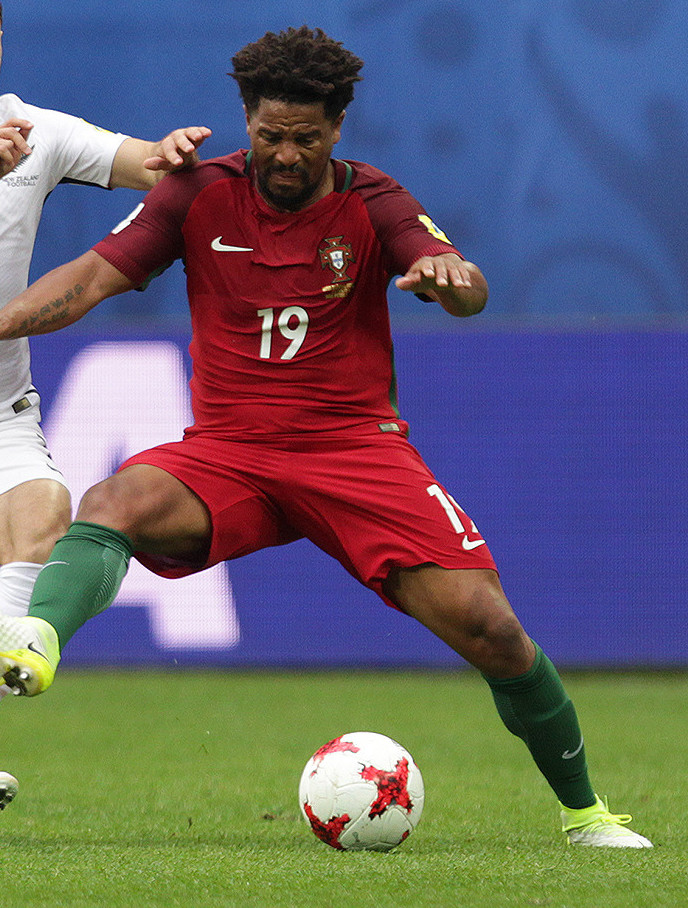
Eliseu playing at the 2017 Confederations Cup

Courtesy of his Málaga performances, Eliseu was first called to the Portugal national team for an exhibition game with Finland on 11 February 2009, but did not leave the bench. He finally made his debut on 10 June, in a 0–0 friendly against Estonia.

Although not part of the provisional 24-player list for the 2010 FIFA World Cup in South Africa, Eliseu was named in a backup list of six players. He scored his first international goal on 7 October 2011, in a 5–3 home win over Iceland for the UEFA Euro 2012 qualifiers where he featured as a left-back and also made two assists.

Eliseu did not make any appearances for his country in 2012 and 2013. He was selected by manager Fernando Santos for his Euro 2016 squad, featuring against Hungary in the group stage (3–3) and Poland in the quarter-finals (1–1, win on penalties) as the tournament ended in victory.

== Career statistics ==
=== Club ===
Appearances and goals by club, season and competition
Club	Season	League			National cup (Note: Includes Taça de Portugal, Copa del Rey)		League cup (Note: Includes Taça da Liga)		Europe		Other		Total	
Club	Season	Division	Apps	Goals	Apps	Goals	Apps	Goals	Apps	Goals	Apps	Goals	Apps	Goals
Belenenses	2002–03	Primeira Liga	1	1	0	0	—		—		—		1	1
Belenenses	2003–04	Primeira Liga	24	1	3	1	—		—		—		27	2
Belenenses	2004–05	Primeira Liga	10	0	1	0	—		—		—		11	0
Belenenses	2006–07	Primeira Liga	17	1	4	1	—		—		—		21	2
Belenenses	Total		52	3	8	2	—		—		—		60	5
Varzim (loan)	2005–06	Liga de Honra	15	3	1	0	—		—		—		16	3
Málaga	2007–08	Segunda División	37	3	2	1	—		—		—		39	4
Málaga	2008–09	La Liga	37	7	1	0	—		—		—		38	7
Málaga	Total		74	10	3	1	—		—		—		77	11
Lazio	2009–10	Serie A	2	0	0	0	—		7 (Note: Appearances in UEFA Europa League)	0	0	0	9	0
Zaragoza (loan)	2009–10	La Liga	21	2	0	0	—		—		—		21	2
Málaga	2010–11	La Liga	35	4	4	1	—		—		—		39	5
Málaga	2011–12	La Liga	25	2	3	0	—		—		—		28	2
Málaga	2012–13	La Liga	28	1	3	0	—		9 (Note: Appearances in UEFA Champions League)	5	—		40	6
Málaga	2013–14	La Liga	28	2	2	1	—		—		—		30	3
Málaga	Total		116	9	12	2	—		9	5	—		137	16
Benfica	2014–15	Primeira Liga	26	4	0	0	3	0	3	0	1 (Note: Appearance in Supertaça Cândido de Oliveira)	0	33	4
Benfica	2015–16	Primeira Liga	31	0	2	0	1	0	10	0	0	0	44	0
Benfica	2016–17	Primeira Liga	12	0	3	0	1	0	5	0	0	0	20	0
Benfica	2017–18	Primeira Liga	6	0	0	0	2	0	3	0	1	0	12	0
Benfica	Total		75	4	5	0	7	0	21	0	2	0	110	4
Career total			355	31	30	5	7	0	37	5	2	0	431	41

=== International ===
Appearances and goals by national team and year
National team	Year	Apps	Goals
Portugal	2009	2	0
Portugal	2011	2	1
Portugal	2014	2	0
Portugal	2015	7	0
Portugal	2016	6	0
Portugal	2017	10	0
Total		29	1

== Honours ==
Lazio

- Supercoppa Italiana: 2009

Benfica

- Primeira Liga: 2014–15, 2015–16, 2016–17
- Taça de Portugal: 2016–17
- Taça da Liga: 2014–15, 2015–16
- Supertaça Cândido de Oliveira: 2014, 2016, 2017

Portugal

- UEFA European Championship: 2016
- FIFA Confederations Cup third place: 2017

Orders

- Commander of the Order of Merit
