= Derley (footballer, born 1987) =

Brazilian footballer

Personal information
- Full name: Vanderley Dias Marinho
- Date of birth: 29 December 1987 (age 38)
- Place of birth: São Luís, Brazil
- Height: 1.83 m (6 ft 0 in)
- Position: Forward

Senior career*
| Years | Team | Apps | (Gls) |
| 2006 | Americano | 0 | (0) |
| 2007 | Bangu | 19 | (10) |
| 2008 | Madureira | 4 | (0) |
| 2008–2009 | Campinense | 4 | (1) |
| 2009 | União São João | 8 | (0) |
| 2010 | Madureira | 17 | (4) |
| 2011 | Ceará | 0 | (0) |
| 2011 | Tiradentes | 7 | (4) |
| 2012 | Cruzeiro | 0 | (0) |
| 2012–2013 | Madureira | 32 | (10) |
| 2013–2014 | Marítimo | 30 | (16) |
| 2014–2017 | Benfica | 15 | (1) |
| 2015–2016 | → Kayserispor (loan) | 23 | (5) |
| 2016–2017 | → Chiapas (loan) | 18 | (3) |
| 2017–2019 | Aves | 53 | (6) |
| 2019–2021 | Muangthong United | 44 | (20) |
| 2021–2023 | Ratchaburi | 59 | (21) |
| 2023–2024 | PT Prachuap | 28 | (6) |
| 2024–2025 | Chonburi | 32 | (14) |
| Total | | 393 | (121) |
- * Club domestic league appearances and goals as of 01:22, 26 August 2025 (UTC)

Vanderley Dias Marinho (born 29 December 1987), commonly known as Derley, is a Brazilian retired professional footballer who plays as a forward.

== Career ==
Born in São Luís, Maranhão, he began his professional career in Brazil at Ceará and after passing through various clubs in the Brazilian lower leagues.

On 25 June 2013, Derley signed a four-year contract with Portuguese club Marítimo. In Portugal, Derley had his breakthrough season, ending Primeira Liga with 16 goals. In all competitions, he scored 18 goals in 34 appearances. His performances sparked interest from Sporting CP and S.L. Benfica.

On 16 July 2014, Derley signed a four-year contract with Portuguese champions Benfica. On 10 August 2014, he debuted in the 2014 Supercup, winning his first major title. On 5 October, he scored his first goal for Benfica in a 4–0 win against Arouca in the league.

On 20 July 2015, Turkish club Kayserispor announced that Derley had joined them on loan from Benfica, until the end of the season. For the following season, he joined Mexican club Chiapas on a season-long loan with option to buy.

== Honours ==
Benfica

- Primeira Liga: 2014–15
- Taça da Liga: 2014–15
- Supertaça Cândido de Oliveira: 2014

Aves

- Taça de Portugal: 2017–18

Chonburi

- Thai League 2 : 2024–25
