= 2014 Valais Cup =

Valais Football Summer Cups

Tournament details
- Host country: Switzerland
- Teams: 4
- Venue: 3 (in 3 host cities)

Final positions
- Champions: (Portugal) Benfica (1st title)
- Runners-up: (Ukraine) Shakhtar Donetsk
- Third place: (Switzerland) Sion

Tournament statistics
- Matches played: 3
- Goals scored: 5 (1.67 per match)
- Best player: (Uruguay) Maxi Pereira (Benfica)

The 2014 Valais Cup was an international football tournament that is part of the Valais Football Summer Cups. Matches being played on 6 July, 30 July and 31 July in Switzerland. It was the second running of the competition, following the 2013 edition. The tournament consisted of three matchdays for a total of three matches.

== Participants ==
The tournament features European top-clubs:

- (Portugal) Benfica
- (Ukraine) Shakhtar Donetsk
- (Switzerland) Sion

== Results ==
Matchdays 2 and 3 were originally scheduled for 12 July and 13 July but due to Benfica having problems with arriving to Switzerland matches were cancelled and moved to the 30 and 31 July.

=== Matchday 1 ===
6 July 2014
17:00 CEST

Shakhtar Donetsk (Ukraine)	1–0	(Switzerland) Sion
Hladkyy 37'	Report1; Report2

Stade St-Germain, Savièse
Attendance: 1,050
Referee: Alain Bieri (Switzerland)

=== Matchday 2 ===
30 July 2014
19:30 CEST

Sion (Switzerland)	0–2	(Portugal) Benfica
	Report1; Report2	Jara 15'; Teixeira 50'

Stade Municipal, Yverdon-les-Bains
Attendance: 3,400
Referee: Fedayi San (Switzerland)

=== Matchday 3 ===
The game between Benfica and Shakhtar Donetsk was cancelled. On the third matchday, Benfica played the game against Spain's Athletic Bilbao. This match was not counted in the standings of the 2014 Valais Cup.

31 July 2014
19:30 CEST

Benfica (Portugal)	0–2	(Spain) Athletic Bilbao
	Report1; Report2	Aduriz 40'; Beñat 72'

Stade Universitaire Saint-Léonard, Fribourg
Attendance: 3,600
Referee: Stephan Klossner (Switzerland)

== Standings ==
Rank	Team	Win	Draw	Loss	GF	GA	GD	Points
1	(Portugal) Benfica	1	0	0	2	0	+2	3
2	(Ukraine) Shakhtar Donetsk	1	0	0	1	0	+1	3
3	(Switzerland) Sion	0	0	2	0	3	–3	0

== Awards ==
- Best player: (Uruguay) Maxi Pereira (Benfica)
