= 2013 Valais Cup =

Valais Football Summer Cups

Tournament details
- Host country: Switzerland
- Teams: 5
- Venue: 1 (in 1 host city)

Final positions
- Champions: (Portugal) Porto (1st title)
- Runners-up: (France) Saint-Étienne
- Third place: (Germany) VfL Wolfsburg
- Fourth place: (Switzerland) Sion

Tournament statistics
- Matches played: 4
- Goals scored: 11 (2.75 per match)

The Valais Cup is an international football tournament that is part of the Valais Football Summer Cups. It is played at the Stade de Tourbillon in Sion, Switzerland.

The competition features football teams preparing their season in Valais and its surroundings.

Five European top-clubs participated in the first edition of the tournament 6, 9 and 13 July 2013: Porto, Marseille, VfL Wolfsburg, Saint-Étienne and Sion. Porto won the Valais Cup after its victory 3–0 against Marseille.

== Participants ==
The tournament featured five European clubs:

- (Portugal) Porto
- (France) Marseille
- (Germany) VfL Wolfsburg
- (France) Saint-Étienne
- (Switzerland) Sion

== Competition format ==
The tournament consisted of three matchdays for a total of four matches. Sion, Marseille and VfL Wolfsburg played two games, while Saint-Étienne and Porto played only one match.

== Results ==
=== Matchday 1 ===
6 July 2013
20:00 CEST

Sion (Switzerland)	0–4	(Germany) VfL Wolfsburg
	Report	Naldo 22'; Diego 29'; Dost 43', 61'

Stade de Tourbillon, Sion
Referee: Stephan Klossner (Switzerland)

=== Matchday 2 ===
9 July 2013
18:00 CEST

Saint-Étienne (France)	1–1	(Germany) VfL Wolfsburg
Hamouma 38'	Report	Lopes 90'
Penalties
	5–4

Stade de Tourbillon, Sion
Referee: Charles Helbling (Switzerland)
9 July 2013
21:00 CEST

Sion (Switzerland)	1–1	(France) Marseille
Karlen 87'	Report	Marques 9' (o.g.)
Penalties
	4–3

Stade de Tourbillon, Sion
Referee: Stefan Studer (Switzerland)

=== Matchday 3 ===
13 July 2013
20:30 CEST

Marseille (France)	0–3	(Portugal) Porto
	Report	Izmailov 29'; Martínez 55'; Iturbe 76'

Stade de Tourbillon, Sion
Referee: Alain Bieri (Switzerland)

== Ranking ==
During the Valais Cup, points were distributed as follows:

- Victory after 90 minutes : 3 pts
- Draw after 90 minutes + victory after penalty shootout : 2 pts
- Draw after 90 minutes + defeat after penalty shootout : 1 pt
- Defeat after 90 minutes : 0 pt

The ranking of each team will be determined as follows:

a) greatest average number of points obtained per match (for teams that play two matches, the total number of points will be divided by two in order to obtain an average);
b) direct confrontation (if applicable);
c) average goal difference per match (for teams that play two matches, the total goal difference will be divided by two in order to obtain an average);
d) average number of goals scored per match (for teams that play two matches, the total number of goals scored will be divided by two in order to obtain an average);
e) by drawing lots in case it is not possible to decide between two teams on the basis of the rules laid down under letters a, b, c and d above.

Pos	Teams	Pld	W	DW	DL	L	GA (Avg.)	Points	Pts. Avg.
1	(Portugal) Porto	1	1	0	0	0	+3	3	3
2	(France) Saint-Étienne	1	0	1	0	0	0	2	2
3	(Germany) VfL Wolfsburg	2	1	0	1	0	+2	4	2
4	(Switzerland) Sion	2	0	1	0	1	-2	2	1
5	(France) Marseille	2	0	0	1	1	-1.5	1	0.5

Source: Valais Cup official website
Pld = Number of match player; W = Win; DW = Draw + victory after penalty shootout; DL = Draw + defeat after penalty shootout; L = Lost; GA (average) = Goal average/Number of matches played; PTS = Points; PTS Average = PTS/M

== Awards ==
Best player: (Brazil) Fernando – Porto
Best goalkeeper: (Brazil) Helton – Porto
