= César Martins =

Brazilian footballer (born 1992)

Personal information
- Full name: César Henrique Martins
- Date of birth: 28 December 1992 (age 33)
- Place of birth: Mairinque, Brazil
- Height: 1.90 m (6 ft 3 in)
- Position: Centre-back

Team information
- Current team: Criciúma
- Number: 37

Youth career
- 2011: Atlético Sorocaba

Senior career*
Years	Team	Apps	(Gls)
2012–2013	Atlético Sorocaba	0	(0)
2013	→ Ponte Preta (loan)	17	(0)
2014	Ponte Preta	10	(1)
2014–2018	Benfica	3	(0)
2015	Benfica B	2	(0)
2015–2016	→ Flamengo (loan)	23	(0)
2016–2017	→ Nacional (loan)	27	(1)
2017–2018	→ Vitória de Setúbal (loan)	5	(0)
2018	→ Juventude (loan)	6	(0)
2018–2020	Santa Clara	48	(3)
2020–2021	Farense	16	(1)
2021–2022	Club Bolívar	44	(4)
2023–2025	Grêmio Novorizontino	78	(9)
2026–	Criciúma	11	(2)
- * Club domestic league appearances and goals as of 15 April 2026

César Henrique Martins (born 28 December 1992), sometimes known as just César, is a Brazilian professional footballer who plays as a centre-back for Criciúma.

== Club career ==
Born in Mairinque, in the São Paulo state, César Martins started competing in hometown club Atlético Sorocaba in the Campeonato Paulista, where his performances sparked the interest of Ponte Preta which signed him on a loan deal on 26 April 2013.

At Ponte Preta, César Martins assumed a starting position, helping the team reach the 2013 Copa Sudamericana Finals, lost to Lanús, moving permanently to Macaca side in December 2014. As the Brazilian team sought to benefit financially from recent performances, on 2 July 2014, they announced that César had signed a five-year deal with incumbent Portuguese champions Benfica for an undisclosed fee, later confirmed to be €2.2M for half of his economic rights.

On 14 December 2014, he debuted in the Primeira Liga, in a Benfica 0–2 away win at Porto, replacing injured Luisão. In late January 2015, he suffered a muscular injury, missing several months, only reappearing on 2 May 2015, when he played for reserve side in a 1–0 home win against Braga B in Segunda Liga.

On 18 July 2015, César Martins was loaned to Flamengo, until 30 June 2016. Despite being regularly used, his spell was not without controversy. In May 2016, he was approached by Flamengo fans outside a shopping market, who verbally insulted him and threw rocks at his car, with his wife and child inside. Two weeks later, in a match with Palmeiras, he stopped a Gabriel Jesus's goalbound shot with his hands, committing a professional foul, which carried a potential nine match ban. Flamengo asked Benfica to retain him for another year, but they declined.

Upon returning to Portugal, he was loaned to Nacional for one-year. He played 30 games there, not avoiding relegation as the club finished last in Primeira Liga. Nacional's president attacked him saying he was the worst centre-back he had ever saw. César defended himself saying he always gave it all for the club and it was coward to name a culprit. In July 2017, he went on his third loan at Benfica, now to Vitória de Setúbal. Mid-season, César requested to return to Brazil and signed with Juventude from Série B. Eight months later, he terminated his contract with Benfica and joined Santa Clara on a two-year deal.

== Honours ==
Ponte Preta

- Copa Sudamericana: Runner-up 2013

Benfica

- Primeira Liga: 2014–15
- Taça da Liga: 2014–15
- Supertaça Cândido de Oliveira: 2014
