= Filip Marković =

Serbian footballer

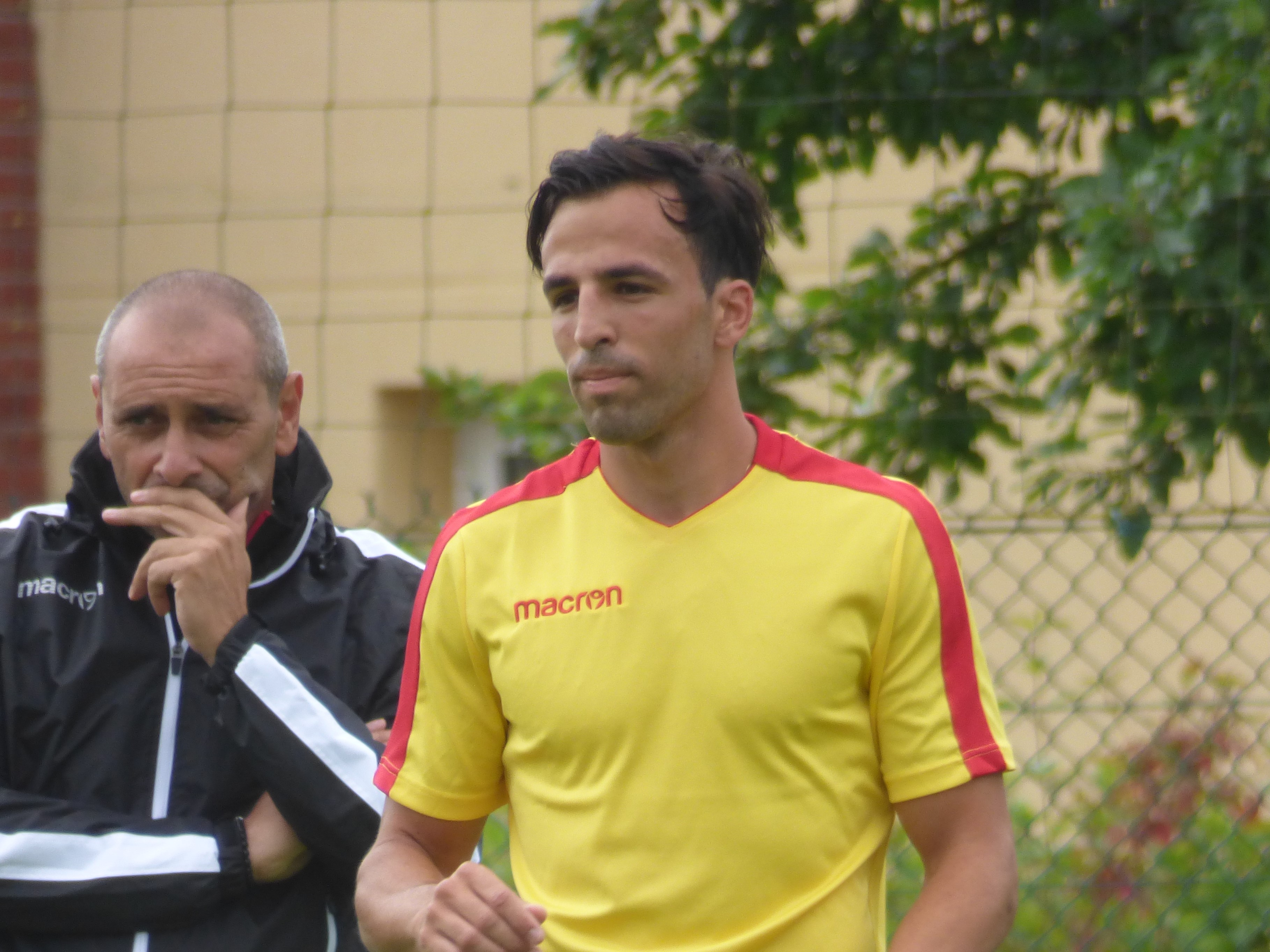
- Marković with Lens in 2018

Personal information
- Full name: Filip Marković
- Date of birth: 3 March 1992 (age 34)
- Place of birth: Čačak, Serbia
- Height: 1.81 m (5 ft 11 in)
- Position: Forward

Youth career
- Borac Čačak
- 2006–2010: Partizan

Senior career*
Years	Team	Apps	(Gls)
2010–2013	Teleoptik	78	(14)
2013–2014	Benfica B	21	(1)
2014–2015	Mallorca	13	(1)
2015–2017	Mouscron	55	(10)
2017–2019	Lens	21	(2)
2019–2020	Śląsk Wrocław	19	(2)
2019	Śląsk Wrocław II	1	(0)
2021	Radnički Niš	10	(0)
Total		218	(29)
- * Club domestic league appearances and goals as of 4 January 2024

Filip Marković (Serbian Cyrillic: Филип Марковић; born 3 March 1992) is a Serbian professional footballer who plays as a forward.

== Club career ==
Born in Čačak, Marković spent most of his graduated from FK Partizan's youth categories, but was promoted to FK Teleoptik, Partizan's farm team, instead of the main squad. On 14 August 2010 he made his debut as a professional, coming on as a late substitute in a 2–0 home success against FK Sinđelić Niš. He scored his first goal on 23 April of the following year, but in a 1–2 away loss against FK Radnički Sombor.

On 11 June 2013, Marković moved to S.L. Benfica, along with his brother Lazar, but was assigned to the reserves while his brother went straight to the main squad. He made his debut for the Encarnados on 1 September, again from the bench in a 1–1 away draw against F.C. Penafiel.

Marković scored his first goal for Benfica B on 6 November 2013, in a 4–4 home draw against C.F. União. He finished the campaign with 21 appearances, the vast majority as a substitute.

On 15 August 2014, Marković signed a two-year deal with the Spanish Segunda División's RCD Mallorca. He played 14 games for them – 5 starts – and scored once in a 4–1 win at UE Llagostera on 19 October.

Marković left Benfica on 9 July 2015, signing a three-year deal at Belgian top flight team Royal Excel Mouscron.

In August 2017, Marković signed for RC Lens in France's Ligue 2. In his second season, he and Moussa Maâzou were completely frozen out by manager Philippe Montanier, and the club unsuccessfully aimed to offload him in January 2019.

== Career statistics ==
Appearances and goals by club, season and competition
Club	Season	League			National Cup		Other		Total	
Club	Season	Division	Apps	Goals	Apps	Goals	Apps	Goals	Apps	Goals
Teleoptik	2010–11	Serbian First League	23	4	1	0	—		24	4
Teleoptik	2011–12	Serbian First League	32	5	1	0	—		33	5
Teleoptik	2012–13	Serbian First League	23	5	1	0	—		24	5
Teleoptik	Total		78	14	3	0	0	0	81	14
Benfica B	2013–14	Portuguese Segunda Liga	21	1	1	0	—		22	1
Mallorca	2014–15	Spanish Segunda División	13	1	1	0	—		14	1
Mouscron	2015–16	Belgian Pro League	31	4	1	0	—		32	4
Mouscron	2016–17	Belgian Pro League	24	6	2	1	4	0	30	7
Mouscron	Total		55	10	3	1	4	0	62	11
Lens	2017–18	Ligue 2	21	2	4	0	—		25	2
Lens	2018–19	Ligue 2	0	0	0	0	—		0	0
Lens	2019–20	Ligue 2	0	0	0	0	—		0	0
Lens	Total		21	2	4	0	0	0	25	2
Śląsk Wrocław	2019–20	Polish Ekstraklasa	19	1	0	0	—		19	1
Radnički Niš	2020–21	Serbian Super Liga	10	0	0	0	—		10	0
Career total			217	29	12	1	4	0	233	30

== Personal life ==
Marković's younger brother, Lazar, is also a footballer. A winger, he also came through in Partizan's youth setup.

== Honours ==
Śląsk Wrocław II

- III liga, gr. III: 2019–20
