= Christian Nana =

Cameroonian footballer

Personal information
- Full name: Christian Nana Kouamou
- Date of birth: 6 May 1988 (age 38)
- Place of birth: Douala, Cameroon
- Height: 1.85 m (6 ft 1 in)
- Position: Midfielder

Senior career*
Years	Team	Apps	(Gls)
2009–2011	Mirandela	45	(0)
2011–2013	Freamunde	33	(2)
2013–2014	Salgueiros 08	28	(4)
2014–2016	Covilhã	26	(0)
2016–2017	Jeunesse Canach	20	(0)
2017–2019	Stallion Laguna	23	(1)
- * Club domestic league appearances and goals as of 27 August 2017

Christian Nana Kouamou (born 6 May 1988, in Douala), known as Nana, is a Cameroonian professional footballer who plays as a defensive midfielder.
