= Tiago Gomes (footballer, born 1986) =

Portuguese footballer

Personal information
- Full name: Tiago Henrique Damil Gomes
- Date of birth: 29 July 1986 (age 40)
- Place of birth: Oeiras, Portugal
- Height: 1.77 m (5 ft 10 in)
- Position: Left-back

Youth career
- 1995–1997: Carcavelos
- 1997–2004: Benfica

Senior career*
Years	Team	Apps	(Gls)
2004–2006	Benfica B	26	(0)
2006–2008	Benfica	0	(0)
2006–2007	→ Estrela Amadora (loan)	5	(0)
2007–2008	→ Zagłębie Lubin (loan)	19	(0)
2008–2009	Osasuna	0	(0)
2009–2011	Belenenses	39	(0)
2011–2014	Estoril	47	(1)
2014–2017	Braga	16	(0)
2015–2016	→ Metz (loan)	20	(0)
2016–2017	→ Apollon Limassol (loan)	18	(0)
2017–2019	Feirense	23	(0)
2019	Universitatea Cluj	12	(0)
2020–2023	Alverca	60	(0)
Total		285	(1)

International career
2003	Portugal U17	15	(0)
2004–2005	Portugal U19	19	(0)
2005–2006	Portugal U20	12	(0)
2008	Portugal U21	3	(0)
2014	Portugal	1	(0)
Medal record
Men's football
Representing Portugal
UEFA European U17 Championship
Winner	2003 Portugal
- * Club domestic league appearances and goals

Tiago Henrique Damil Gomes (born 29 July 1986) is a Portuguese former professional footballer who played as a left-back.

== Club career ==
Gomes was born in Oeiras, Lisbon District. A product of S.L. Benfica's academy, he spent his first two professional seasons on loan, 2006–07 at C.F. Estrela da Amadora – in the Primeira Liga – where he played with namesake Tiago Filipe Figueiras Gomes, and the following at Poland's Zagłębie Lubin; he only appeared for his parent club during pre-season.

In August 2008, Gomes signed for CA Osasuna on a free transfer, making no competitive appearances for the Navarrese in his only season. One year later, he joined another Lisbon-based team, C.F. Os Belenenses, where he also did not manage to be first choice and they suffered relegation at the end of the campaign.

Gomes agreed to a contract at G.D. Estoril Praia in summer 2011. He won the Liga de Honra in his debut campaign, under manager Marco Silva.

On 4 July 2014, Gomes moved to fellow Portuguese top-division club S.C. Braga on a three-year deal. He scored his only goal in a 2–0 away win over Rio Ave F.C. in the group stage of the Taça da Liga, from a free kick, and was subsequently loaned to FC Metz (French Ligue 2) and Apollon Limassol FC (Cypriot First Division).

Until his retirement at the age of 36, Gomes represented top-flight side C.D. Feirense, FC Universitatea Cluj of the Romanian Liga II and F.C. Alverca in the Portuguese third division, where he fell short in the 2022–23 promotion series.

== International career ==
On 7 November 2014, Gomes was called up by new Portugal manager Fernando Santos for a UEFA Euro 2016 qualifier against Armenia and a friendly with Argentina. He made his debut in the latter, starting but leaving injured after 51 minutes in an eventual 1–0 win at Old Trafford.

== Career statistics ==
As of 28 January 2015

Appearances and goals by club, season and competition
Club	Season	League			Cup		League Cup		Continental		Other		Total	
Club	Season	Division	Apps	Goals	Apps	Goals	Apps	Goals	Apps	Goals	Apps	Goals	Apps	Goals
Estrela Amadora (loan)	2006–07	Primeira Liga	5	0	1	0	—		—		—		6	0
Zagłębie Lubin (loan)	2007–08	Ekstraklasa	19	0	0	0	6	0	2 (Note: Appearances in UEFA Champions League)	0	—		27	0
Osasuna	2008–09	La Liga	0	0	0	0	—		—		—		0	0
Belenenses	2009–10	Primeira Liga	13	0	0	0	2	0	—		—		15	0
Belenenses	2010–11	Segunda Liga	26	0	0	0	1	0	—		—		27	0
Belenenses	Total		39	0	0	0	3	0	—		—		42	0
Estoril	2011–12	Segunda Liga	28	1	2	0	5	0	—		—		35	1
Estoril	2012–13	Primeira Liga	5	0	0	0	3	0	—		—		8	0
Estoril	2013–14	Primeira Liga	14	0	3	0	1	0	—		—		18	0
Estoril	Total		47	1	5	0	10	0	—		—		62	1
Braga	2014–15	Primeira Liga	10	0	0	0	2	0	—		—		12	0
Career total			120	1	6	0	21	0	2	0	0	0	149	1

== Honours ==
Zagłębie Lubin

- Polish Super Cup: 2007

Estoril

- Liga de Honra: 2011–12

Apollon Limassol

- Cypriot Cup: 2016–17

Portugal U17

- UEFA European Under-17 Championship: 2003
