= Alhassan Wakaso =

Ghanaian footballer (born 1992)

Personal information
- Date of birth: 7 January 1992 (age 34)
- Place of birth: Tamale, Ghana
- Height: 1.80 m (5 ft 11 in)
- Position: Defensive midfielder

Youth career
- 2009–2011: Portimonense

Senior career*
| Years | Team | Apps | (Gls) |
| 2010–2013 | Portimonense | 57 | (3) |
| 2013–2017 | Rio Ave | 84 | (1) |
| 2014 | → Portimonense (loan) | 13 | (2) |
| 2017 | Lorient | 13 | (0) |
| 2017–2021 | Vitória Guimarães | 54 | (2) |
| 2021–2022 | Olympiakos Nicosia | 11 | (0) |
| 2023–2024 | Leixões | 23 | (0) |
| 2024–2025 | Ionikos | 7 | (0) |
| 2025–2026 | Semen Padang | 35 | (1) |

International career
| 2019 | Ghana | 1 | (0) |
- * Club domestic league appearances and goals as of 9 March 2026

Alhassan Wakaso (born 7 January 1992) is a Ghanaian professional footballer who plays as a defensive midfielder.

== Club career ==
Born in Tamale, Wakaso arrived in Portugal in 2009 at the age of 17, signing with Portimonense S.C. in the Segunda Liga. On 28 October of the following year, when he was still a junior, he made his debut for the first team, featuring in a 3–2 away loss against C.D. Aves in the second round of the Taça da Liga.

Wakaso was definitely promoted to the Algarve club's main squad for the 2011–12 season. On 23 December 2012, with the side still in the second division, he scored his first goal as a professional, in a 2–1 league win at Vitória S.C. B.

Wakaso moved to the Primeira Liga on 20 June 2013, signing with Rio Ave F.C. for three years. He made his debut in the competition for them on 18 August, starting and being replaced late into a 3–0 away victory over C.F. Os Belenenses. His only league goal during his spell would come on 25 September 2016, in the 2–1 defeat at F.C. Paços de Ferreira.

In the last minutes of the January 2014 transfer window, Wakaso returned to Portimonense on a five-month loan. Three years later, he joined FC Lorient of the French Ligue 1 on a three-and-a-half-year contract. He returned to Portugal and its top tier in the following off-season, however, agreeing to a three-year deal at Vitória de Guimarães.

Wakaso missed the entire 2019–20 campaign, due to an injury to his right knee. In September 2021, he signed a one-year contract with Cypriot First Division side Olympiakos Nicosia. Subsequently, he represented in quick succession Leixões SC (Portuguese second division) and Ionikos FC (Super League Greece 2).

== International career ==
Wakaso made his debut for Ghana on 26 March 2019, in a 3–1 friendly defeat of Mauritania.

== Personal life ==
Wakaso's older brother, Mubarak, was also a footballer and a midfielder. He spent most of his career in Spain.
