= Luís Tinoco =

Luís Tinoco may refer to:

- Luís Tinoco (composer), Portuguese composer
- Luís Tinoco (footballer), Portuguese footballer
