= 2013–14 S.L. Benfica season =

Benfica
2013–14 season
- President: Luís Filipe Vieira
- Head coach: Jorge Jesus
- Stadium: Estádio da Luz
- Primeira Liga: 1st
- Taça de Portugal: Winners
- Taça da Liga: Winners
- UEFA Champions League: Group stage
- UEFA Europa League: Runners-up
- Top goalscorer: League: Lima (14); All: Lima (21)
- Highest home attendance: 63,982 v Olhanense (20 April 2014)
- Lowest home attendance: 28,848 v Arouca (6 December 2013)
- Average home league attendance: 43,613
- Biggest win: Benfica 5–0 Gil Vicente (4 January 2014)
- Biggest defeat: Paris Saint-Germain 3–0 Benfica (2 October 2013)
Home colours	Away colours

The 2013–14 season was Sport Lisboa e Benfica's 110th season in existence and the club's 80th consecutive season in the top flight of Portuguese football. It involved Benfica competing in the Primeira Liga, Taça de Portugal, Taça da Liga, the group stage of the UEFA Champions League, and the knockout phase in the UEFA Europa League. Benfica qualified for the Champions League by coming second in the previous Primeira Liga.

On 4 June 2013, coach Jorge Jesus renewed his contract for a further two seasons, making him the first manager since Otto Glória in 1958–59 to start a fifth consecutive season at Benfica.

The season was one of the best in Benfica's history, as the club won its 33rd title, its fifth Taça da Liga (without conceding a single goal), reached the Europa League final for the second consecutive season (without any defeat) and won its 25th Taça de Portugal achieving the tenth double (record) of the club. By winning the Primeira Liga, Taça de Portugal and Taça da Liga, Benfica achieved a unique treble in Portugal. Benfica also finished the season unbeaten in home matches, and the 57 games played are a club record for a single season.

== Events ==
=== Pre-season ===
The pre-season started on 1 July 2013 with medical evaluations on the players. After a brief period of exercising at the Caixa Futebol Campus the team was due to travel on 8 July for Évian-les-Bains in France, but on 6 July, it chooses to stay at Futebol Campus instead of travelling to France, but still maintained the three pre-season games against Ètoile Carouge, Bordeaux and Sion. The team participated in the semi-finals of the tournament Lisbon Football Association Honour's Cup, where they played against Sporting CP B, using a mix of first team players like Ola John, Rodrigo or Jardel, with the remaining players from Benfica B. In the 3rd/4th place match, Benfica fielded a team with only one first-team player, Paulo Lopes. On 24, 26 and 27 July, Benfica faced Peñarol, Levante and Nice at Estádio Algarve, respectively. On 31 July, Benfica played Elche on their presentation game in Elche. They then took part in the sixth edition of the Eusébio Cup against São Paulo on 3 August, ending their pre-season on 9 August against Napoli as part of the MSC Crociere Cup.

=== August ===
- 18: Benfica is defeated at Estádio dos Barreiros by Marítimo in their first loss of the season. Additionally, Benfica continue their negative record in the first matchday, not winning it for the ninth consecutive season, never with Jorge Jesus, and only once during the 10-year term of Luís Filipe Vieira.
- 25: Benfica beat Gil Vicente with a dramatic stoppage time late goal from Lima at the 93rd minute, a minute after Marković equalizing the match. The Serbian armada was decisive in the victory, with both Sulejmani and Đuričić assisting in a goal. Earlier, Diogo Viana made it 1–0 for the gilistas after a Maxi Pereira mistake.
- 29: Benfica draw Paris Saint-Germain, Olympiacos and Anderlecht in the Champions League draw.
- 31: In the third matchday against Sporting CP, Benfica draw at the José Alvalade. The lions took the lead after an early goal from Fredy Montero, but Lazar Marković equalized the match in a solo run past three Sporting defenders, finished by rolling the ball under goalkeeper Rui Patrício.

=== September ===
- 14: Benfica beat Paços de Ferreira, with an early goal from Enzo Pérez, cemented by two goals from Ezequiel Garay, the first time he scored twice at Benfica. Ljubomir Fejsa and Guilherme Siqueira made their club debut.
- 17: In the first day of the Champions League, Benfica beat Anderlecht with a goal from Filip Đuričić on the fourth minute, followed by a Luisão goal at the half-hour mark. Đuričić scored his first goal at Benfica and first Champions League goal, while Luisão scored his fourth Champions League goal. It was Benfica's first clean sheet of the season.
- 22: In Guimarães, Benfica beat Vitória de Guimarães 1–0 after a goal from Óscar Cardozo, which rebounded on Marco Matias. Vitória's David Addy was sent off earlier in the match.
- 28: Benfica draw with Belenenses, losing the advantage won in the previous round and finishing the month five points from first place. Both coach and president complained of mistakes of the referee Jorge Tavares.

=== October ===
- 2: In the second round of the Champions League, Benfica is defeated by Paris Saint-Germain in Paris 3–0, with the players received in Lisbon under criticism from the fans.
- 6: At Estoril, Benfica beat the local team 1–2, with goals from Lima and Óscar Cardozo. Despite the win, the team received further criticism from the fans.
- 19: Benfica beat Cinfães in the third round of the Portuguese Cup, with a sole goal from Ola John, in the debut of Ivan Cavaleiro.
- 23: In the third day of the Champions League, at home, Benfica draw before Greek side Olympiacos, with a goal from Óscar Cardozo in the 84th minute. In a rainy night, the pitch became soaked, difficulting the task of the players. Olympiacos' Roberto and Javier Saviola returned to the Estádio da Luz.
- 27: Benfica beat Nacional with goals from Guilherme Siqueira and Óscar Cardozo. The Paraguayan ties Nuno Gomes for ninth place in the all-time goalscoring list for Benfica.

=== November ===
- 1: In Coimbra, Benfica trash Académica 3–0, with goals from Óscar Cardozo, and Lazar Marković, with an own goal completing the score.
- 6: Benfica lose 1–0 with Olympiacos on the fourth day of the Champions League, at the Karaiskakis Stadium. Roberto won man of the match, saving the Greek team numerous times.
- 9: On the fourth round of the Portuguese Cup, Benfica defeat Sporting CP 4–3. A hat-trick from Óscar Cardozo and a late goal from Luisão were enough to defeat the long-time rival. In an emotional match, which ended tied at 3–3 at regular time, the aforementioned goal from Luisão untied the score at overtime.
- 19: Jorge Jesus is suspended for 30 days for his actions in Guimarães by the Portuguese Football Federation (FPF).
- 23: In the tennth league matchday, Benfica beat Braga with a goal in the 73rd minute from Nemanja Matić, finishing November one point from leaders Porto.
- 27: On the fifth day of the Champions League, at the Constant Vanden Stock Stadium, Benfica beat Anderlecht by 3–2 with goals from Nemanja Matić and Rodrigo, and own goal from Chancel Mbemba. It was the club's first win against Anderlecht on Belgian soil.

=== December ===
- 1: Benfica beat Rio Ave in Vila do Conde with a goal from Rodrigo and a double from Lima.
- 7: In the first game of the twelve matchday, at home, Benfica draw 2–2 with Arouca with a goal from Rodrigo. David Simão, a youth graduate from Benfica, scored the visiting team's only goal. Jesus received criticism for his options, mostly by using Bruno Cortês in the match.
- 10: In the final matchday of the Champions League group stage, Benfica beat Paris Saint-Germain 2–1. Lima and Nicolás Gaitán scored the goals. It meant the third time in four years, Benfica fails to progress to the knockout round of the Champions League.
- 15: At the Estádio do Algarve, Benfica beat Olhanense with goals from Lima, Nemanja Matić and Miralem Sulejmani. Goalkeeper Jan Oblak made his debut for Benfica following an injury to regular starter Artur.
- 20: Benfica beat Vitória de Setúbal at the Estádio do Bonfim, with goals from Rodrigo and Lima.
- 31: In the first day of the League Cup, Benfica beat Nacional after an own goal from Mexer.

=== January ===
- 4: In the fifth round of the Portuguese Cup, Benfica defeat Gil Vicente with a double from Rodrigo and Lima, plus another from Lazar Marković.
- 5: Eusébio, former Benfica player and club legend, dies aged 71.
- 12: Benfica beat Porto 2–0 with goals from Rodrigo and Ezequiel Garay. In a nearly sold out stadium, all Benfica players wore a black ribbon and all names on the back of the players' shirts were of Eusébio. Benfica returned to the first position on the table, after losing it to Porto in their previous league match. It was also the first time since 2009 that Benfica defeated Porto in a league match.
- 15: Benfica sells Nemanja Matić to Chelsea.
- 16: On the second matchday of the League Cup, Benfica beat Leixões 2–0, with goals from Filip Đuričić and Ivan Cavaleiro, both scoring their first goals of the season.
- 19: Benfica defeat Marítimo, with a double from Rodrigo.
- 25: On third day of the League Cup, Benfica beat Gil Vicente with a goal from Miralem Sulejmani. Benfica will face Porto in the semi-finals.
- 31: Benfica sells Rodrigo and André Gomes to an investment firm. Both remain at Benfica until the end of the season.

=== February ===
- 1: Benfica draw with Gil Vicente, at the Estádio Cidade de Barcelos, with a goal from Lima; Óscar Cardozo misses a penalty.
- 5: In the quarter-finals of the Portuguese Cup, Benfica beat Penafiel with a goal from Miralem Sulejmani.
- 11: On matchday 18, Benfica beat Sporting CP 2–0, with goals from Nicolás Gaitán and then an individual effort by Enzo Pérez, keeping the first place with a four point lead. The match was scheduled to be played on February 9, but was postponed after the Estádio da Luz faced technical difficulties.
- 16: On the 19th matchday, Benfica beat Paços de Ferreira at the Estádio da Mata Real, with goals from Ezequiel Garay and Lazar Marković.
- 20: In the Round of 32 of the Europa League, Benfica defeat PAOK in Greece, with a goal from Lima.
- 24: In matchday 20, Benfica beat Vitória de Guimarães, with a sole goal from Lazar Marković.
- 25: Former captain and club legend, Mário Coluna passes away at age 78.
- 27: Benfica beat PAOK 3–0, with goals from Nicolás Gaitán, Lima and Lazar Marković, ensuring progression to the Round of 16.

=== March ===
- 2: In matchday 21, Benfica beat Belenenses with a sole goal from Nicolás Gaitán.
- 9: On the 22nd matchday, Benfica faces Estoril, winning 2–0 with goals from Luisão and Rodrigo.
- 13: In the Round of 16 of the Europa League, Benfica beat Tottenham Hotspur at White Hart Lane, with a goal from Rodrigo and a double from Luisão.
- 17: On matchday 23, Benfica beat Nacional at the Estádio da Madeira 4–2, with goals from Lima and Rodrigo, plus a double from Ezequiel Garay.
- 20: In the second leg of the Round of 16, Benfica eliminate Tottenham Hotspur after a 2–2 draw. Goals were scored by Ezequiel Garay and Lima.
- 23: On matchday 24, Benfica beat Académica with a double from Lima and another from Enzo Pérez.
- 26: In the first leg of the semi-finals of the Portuguese Cup, Benfica lose to Porto at the Estádio do Dragão, with an early header from Jackson Martínez.
- 30: On matchday 25, Benfica beat Braga at the Estádio Municipal de Braga with a goal from Lima, now with a seven point lead.

=== April ===
- 3: In the first leg of the quarter-finals of the Europa League, Benfica beat AZ at AFAS Stadion with a goal from Eduardo Salvio.
- 7: On matchday 26, Benfica beat Rio Ave 4–0, with goals from Rodrigo, Nicolás Gaitán and a double from Óscar Cardozo, both from the penalty kick.
- 10: In the second leg of the quarter-finals of the Europa League, Benfica beat AZ Alkmaar 2–0, with a double from Rodrigo, progressing to face Juventus in the semi-finals.
- 13: On matchday day 27, Benfica beat Arouca with goals from Rodrigo and Nicolás Gaitán, only needing three points to win the championship with three matches left on the season.
- 17: In the second leg of the Portuguese Cup semi-finals, Benfica beat Porto 3–1 in a high-profile, high-pressure match, eliminating them and reaching the second consecutive Portuguese Cup final. Goals were scored by Eduardo Salvio, Enzo Pérez and with an individual effort, André Gomes scored the decisive goal.
- 21: On matchday 28, Benfica beat Olhanense with a double from Lima, winning their record 33rd title, with two games to spare.
- 24: In the first leg of the Europa League semi-finals, Benfica beat Juventus by 2–1 with goals from Ezequiel Garay and Lima, taking a precious advantage for the second leg.
- 27: In the semi-finals of the League Cup, Benfica eliminate Porto, this time away at the Estádio do Dragão, on penalty kicks after a null at the end of regular time.

=== May ===
- 1: In the second leg of the semi-finals of the Europa League, Benfica draw to Juventus at Juventus Stadium, eliminating the Italian club from the Europa League. Benfica will play their second consecutive European final, albeit without Enzo Pérez, Lazar Marković and Eduardo Salvio.
- 4: On matchday 29, an already-crowned Champion and with some key players resting for the upcoming Europa League finals, Benfica faced Vitória de Setúbal and draw 1–1, with a goal from André Gomes.
- 7: At the League Cup final in Leiria, Benfica beat Rio Ave 2–0, with goals from Rodrigo and Luisão, thus conquering their fifth Taça da Liga.
- 10: In the final matchday of the championship, a resting Benfica lose to Porto at the Estádio do Dragão 2–1, with a goal from Enzo Pérez. Benfica end the campaign 13 points ahead of rivals Porto.
- 15: In the Europa League final against Sevilla, Benfica lose on the penalty kicks after Óscar Cardozo and Rodrigo each have their shots defended. It is the club's third loss in the Europa League finals.
- 18: In the Portuguese Cup final, Benfica defeated Rio Ave 1–0 with a goal from Nicolás Gaitán, securing their 25th Taça de Portugal. This victory completed a treble of domestic trophies, as Benfica had already won the Primeira Liga and the Taça da Liga, marking their first Portuguese double since 1987 and establishing a record treble.

== Stadium ==
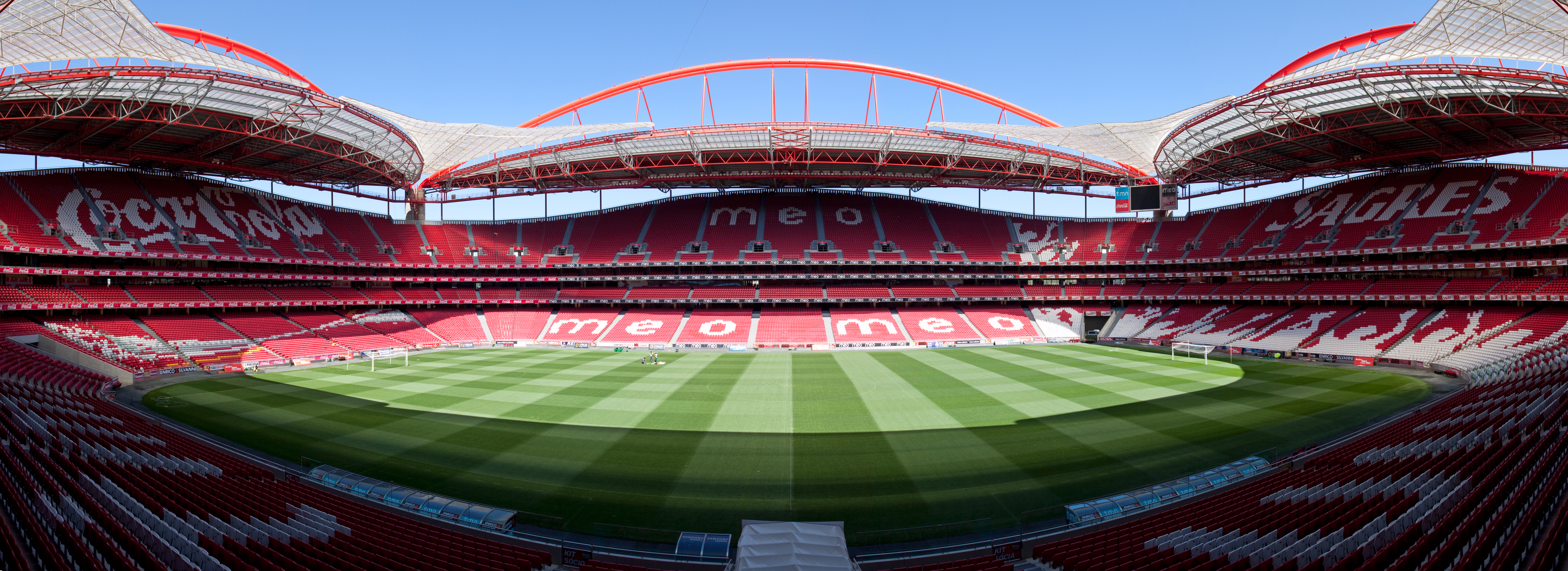

Ground (capacity and dimensions)	Estádio da Luz (65,647 / 105x68m)
Training ground	Caixa Futebol Campus

== Players ==
=== Squad information ===
N	Pos.	Nat.	Name	Age	Since	App	Goals	Ends	Transfer fee	Notes
1	GK	(Brazil)	Artur	33	2011	93	0	2015	Free	
3	CB	(Portugal)	S. Vitória	27	2013	0	0	2017	Free	
4	CB	(Brazil)	Luisão (captain)	33	2003	370	33	2017	€3.0M	
5	DM	(Serbia)	Fejsa	25	2013	0	0	2018	€5.0M	
6	CM	(Portugal)	R. Amorim	29	2008	105	6	2017	€1.0M	Originally from youth system
7	FW	(Paraguay)	Cardozo	31	2007	261	161	2016	€11.6M	
8	RW	(Serbia)	Sulejmani	25	2013	0	0	2018	Free	
9	FW	(Argentina)	Funes Mori	23	2013	0	0	2018	Free	
10	AM	(Serbia)	F. Djuricic	22	2013	0	0	2018	€6.0M	
11	FW	(Brazil)	Lima	30	2012	49	30	2016	€4.0M	
12	LB	(Brazil)	Cortez	27	2013	0	0	2014	Loan	
13	GK	(Portugal)	Paulo Lopes	36	2012	5	0	2014	Free	Originally from youth system
14	RB	(Uruguay)	Maxi	30	2007	248	16	2015	€6.7M	
15	LW	(Netherlands)	John	22	2012	42	4	2017	€8.0M	
16	LB	(Brazil)	G. Siqueira	28	2013	0	0	2014	Free	
18	RW	(Argentina)	Salvio	23	2012	89	23	2017	€13.5M	Played on loan in the 2010–11 season
19	FW	(Spain)	Rodrigo	23	2011	77	27	2019	€6.0M	
20	LW	(Argentina)	Nico Gaitán	26	2010	136	18	2018	€8.4M	
21	DM	(Serbia)	Matic	25	2011	77	6	2018	Free	
22	CB	(Serbia)	Mitrovic	24	2013	0	0	2018	€1.1M	
23	RW	(Uruguay)	Urreta	24	2008	27	2	2015	€1.26M	
24	CB	(Argentina)	Garay	27	2011	87	4	2015	€5.5M	
28	RB	(Portugal)	Sílvio	26	2013	0	0	2014	Loan	Originally from youth system
30	DM	(Portugal)	A. Gomes	20	2012	18	2	2019	Youth system	
33	CB	(Brazil)	Jardel	28	2011 (Winter)	68	2	2018	€0.5M	
34	FB	(Portugal)	A. Almeida	23	2011	38	0	2018	Free	
35	CM	(Argentina)	Pérez	28	2011	51	4	2016	€5.5M	
41	GK	(Slovenia)	Oblak	21	2010	0	0	2018	€1.7M	
50	LW	(Serbia)	L. Markovic	20	2013	0	0	2018	€6.25M	

- Source: S.L. Benfica (for EU passport, country as international player, contract ending and transfer fee)
- Ordered by squad number.

=== Transfers in ===
No.	Pos.	Nat.	Name	Age	Moving from	Type	Transfer window	Ends	Transfer fee	Source
8	RW	(Serbia)	Miralem Sulejmani	24	Ajax (Netherlands)	Transfer	Summer	2018	Free	Record, A Bola
10	AM	(Serbia)	Filip Đuričić	21	Heerenveen (Netherlands)	Transfer	Summer	2018	€6.0M	A Bola
	RW	(Paraguay)	Jorge Rojas	20	Cerro Porteño (Paraguay)	Transfer	Summer	2018	€1.2M	A Bola
22	CB	(Serbia)	Stefan Mitrović	23	Kortrijk (Belgium)	Transfer	Summer	2018	€1.1M	Benfica
50	LW	(Serbia)	Lazar Marković	19	Partizan (Serbia)	Transfer	Summer	2018	€6.25M	A Bola
3	CB	(Portugal)	Steven Vitória	26	Estoril	Transfer	Summer	2017	Free	Benfica
2	CB	(Argentina)	Lisandro López	23	Arsenal (Argentina)	Transfer	Summer	2018	€5.0M	Benfica
31	AM	(Argentina)	Luis Fariña	22	Racing (Argentina)	Transfer	Summer	2018	€3.5M	Sapo Desporto
	LW	(Portugal)	Pizzi	23	Atlético Madrid (Spain)	Transfer	Summer	2018	Undisclosed	Atlético Madrid
9	FW	(Argentina)	Rogelio Funes Mori	22	River Plate (Argentina)	Transfer	Summer	2018	100% of Rodrigo Mora	Record
5	MF	(Serbia)	Ljubomir Fejsa	24	Olympiacos (Greece)	Transfer	Summer	2018	€5M	Maisfutebol
12	LB	(Brazil)	Bruno Cortês	26	São Paulo (Brazil)	Loan	Summer	2014	N/A	A Bola
28	RB	(Portugal)	Sílvio	25	Atlético Madrid (Spain)	Loan	Summer	2014	N/A	Atlético Madrid
16	LB	(Brazil)	Guilherme Siqueira	27	Granada (Spain)	Loan	Summer	2014	Free	Benfica
6	CM	(Portugal)	Ruben Amorim	28	Braga	Loan return	Summer	2014	N/A	
41	GK	(Slovenia)	Jan Oblak	20	Rio Ave	Loan return	Summer	2016	N/A	

Total expenditure: ▼€27.0 million

=== Transfers out ===
No.	Pos.	Nat.	Name	Age	Moving to	Type	Transfer window	Transfer fee	Source
10	AM	(Argentina)	Pablo Aimar	33	Johor Darul Takzim (Malaysia)	End of contract	Summer	Free	A Bola
27	CB	(Portugal)	Miguel Vítor	24	PAOK (Greece)	End of contract	Summer	Free	PAOK
	CM	(Portugal)	Carlos Martins	31	Benfica B	Demoted	Summer	Free	
	AM	(Portugal)	David Simão	23	Arouca	Transfer	Summer	Free	Maisfutebol
	LW	(Spain)	Nolito	26	Celta de Vigo (Spain)	Transfer	Summer	€2.6M	Celta de Vigo
	AM	(Brazil)	Felipe Menezes	25	Palmeiras (Brazil)	Transfer	Summer	Free	Palmeiras
	MF	(Portugal)	Nuno Coelho	25	Arouca	Transfer	Summer	Free	A Bola
	MF	(Argentina)	José Luis Fernández	25	Godoy Cruz (Argentina)	Transfer	Summer	Free	Diario Uno
	MF	(Brazil)	Diego Lopes	19	Rio Ave	Transfer	Summer	Free	Rio Ave
	CB	(Portugal)	Roderick	22	Rio Ave	Transfer	Summer	Free	Rio Ave
	FW	(Uruguay)	Rodrigo Mora	25	River Plate (Argentina)	Transfer	Summer	€3.5M (50% of Funes Mori)	O Jogo
	LB	(Portugal)	Luisinho	28	Deportivo La Coruña (Spain)	Transfer	Summer	Free	Deportivo
	FW	(Portugal)	Hugo Vieira	24	Braga	Transfer	Summer	Free	O Jogo
	FW	(Brazil)	Alípio	21	Omonia Nicosia (Cyprus)	Transfer	Summer	Free	Omonoia
	GK	(Brazil)	Júlio César	26		Contract terminated	Summer	Free	A Bola
	LB	(Paraguay)	Lorenzo Melgarejo	22	Kuban Krasnodar (Russia)	Transfer	Summer	€5M	CMVM
31	FW	(Brazil)	Alan Kardec	24	Palmeiras (Brazil)	Loan	Summer	Undisclosed	Palmeiras
	FW	(Portugal)	Nélson Oliveira	21	Rennes (France)	Loan	Summer	Undisclosed	Stade Rennais
	CB	(Brazil)	Sidnei	23	Espanyol (Spain)	Loan	Summer	Undisclosed	Espanyol
	LW	(Portugal)	Pizzi	23	Espanyol (Spain)	Loan	Summer	Undisclosed	Espanyol
	FW	(Brazil)	Michel	26	Al Wakrah (Qatar)	Loan	Summer	Undisclosed	Maisfutebol
	AM	(Argentina)	Luis Fariña	22	Bani Yas (United Arab Emirates)	Loan	Summer	Undisclosed	Maisfutebol
	FW	(Argentina)	Franco Jara	24	Estudiantes (LP) (Argentina)	Loan	Summer	Undisclosed	Record
	CB	(Argentina)	Lisandro López	23	Getafe (Spain)	Loan	Summer	Undisclosed	Marca
12	LB	(Brazil)	Bruno Cortês	26	São Paulo (Brazil)	Loan end	Winter	Free	Globoesporte
22	CB	(Serbia)	Stefan Mitrović	23	Real Valladolid (Spain)	Loan	Winter	Undisclosed	Real Vallolid
15	LW	(Netherlands)	Ola John	21	Hamburg (Germany)	Loan	Winter	Undisclosed	DN
21	CM	(Serbia)	Nemanja Matić	24	Chelsea (England)	Transfer	Winter	€25M	BBC
	GK	(Spain)	Roberto	24	Atlético Madrid (Spain)	Transfer	Winter	€6M	

Total income: ▲€42.1 million

== Technical staff ==
Position	Staff
Manager	Jorge Jesus
Assistant managers	Raúl José; Miguel Quaresma; Minervino Pietra
Fitness coach	Mário Monteiro
Goalkeeping coach	Hugo Oliveira
Club doctors	João Paulo Almeida; Bento Leitão
Physiotherapists	Carlos Costa; Paulo Rebelo; Telmo Firmino
Opposition scout	Marco Pedroso
Director of football	Lourenço Pereira Coelho
B team manager	Hélder Cristóvão

Last updated: 17 June 2013
Source: S.L. Benfica

== Pre-season friendlies ==
Win Draw Loss

13 July 2013 Friendly	Étoile Carouge	1–6	Benfica	Carouge, Switzerland
19:30 WEST (UTC+01:00)	Delley 36'		Salvio 13', 38'; Lima 20'; Sulejmani 49', 76'; Urretaviscaya 61'	Stadium: Stade de la Fontenette

14 July 2013 Friendly	Benfica	3–3	Bordeaux	Nyon, Switzerland
19:00 WEST (UTC+01:00)	Lima 4' (pen.); López 62'; Salvio 67'		Sertic 23'; Saivet 44', 90+1'	Stadium: Centre sportif de Colovray Nyon

16 July 2013 Friendly	Sion	2–3	Benfica	Coppet, Switzerland
18:45 WEST (UTC+01:00)	Veloso 72'; Marques 81'		Lima 44'; Marković 60', 68'	Stadium: Stade de Copet; Attendance: 4,000

20 July 2013 Taça de Honra	Benfica	1–2	Sporting CP	Estoril, Portugal
21:15 WEST (UTC+01:00)	Soares 6'		Reis 34'; Fokobo 52'	Stadium: Estádio António Coimbra da Mota; Referee: Quitério Almeida

21 July 2013 Taça de Honra	Belenenses	0–0 (5–6 p.)	Benfica	Estoril, Portugal
18:30 WEST (UTC+01:00)				Stadium: Estádio António Coimbra da Mota; Referee: Pedro Silva

24 July 2013 Friendly	Benfica	1–1	Peñarol	Portimão, Portugal
19:45 WEST (UTC+01:00)	Marković 17'		Rodríguez 23'	Stadium: Estádio Municipal de Portimão; Referee: Bruno Paixão

26 July 2013 Friendly	Benfica	2–1	Levante	Faro, Portugal
19:45 WEST (UTC+01:00)	Lima 55', 90+4' (pen.)		El Zhar 29'	Stadium: Estádio do Algarve; Referee: Paulo Baptista

27 July 2013 Friendly	Benfica	2–1	Nice	Faro, Portugal
19:45 WEST (UTC+01:00)	Marković 11'; Lima 13'		Eysseric 33' (pen.)	Stadium: Estádio do Algarve; Referee: Bruno Esteves

31 July 2013 Friendly	Elche	1–3	Benfica	Elche, Spain
19:45 WEST (UTC+01:00)	Stevanović 60'		Rodrigo 17', 22', 26'	Stadium: Estadio Manuel Martínez Valero; Attendance: 17,000; Referee: Antonio Mateu Lahoz

3 August 2013 Eusébio Cup	Benfica	0–2	São Paulo	Lisbon, Portugal
19:45 WEST (UTC+01:00)			Aloísio 53'; Toloi 63'	Stadium: Estádio da Luz; Attendance: 30,638; Referee: Duarte Gomes

9 August 2013 MSC Crociere Cup	Napoli	2–1	Benfica	Naples, Italy
19:45 WEST (UTC+01:00)	Behrami 8'; Higuaín 70'		Luisão 44'	Stadium: Stadio San Paolo; Referee: Carmine Russo

== Competitions ==
=== Overview ===
Competition	Started round	Final position / round	First match	Last match
Primeira Liga	—	1st	18 August 2013	11 May 2014
Taça de Portugal	Third round	Winners	19 October 2013	18 May 2014
Taça da Liga	Group stage	Winners	30 December 2013	7 May 2014
UEFA Champions League	Group stage	Group stage	17 September 2013	10 December 2013
UEFA Europa League	Round of 32	Runners-up	20 February 2014	14 May 2014

Updated to match played 18 May 2014
Source: Competitions

=== Primeira Liga ===
==== League table ====
Pos	Team	Pld	W	D	L	GF	GA	GD	Pts	Qualification or relegation
1	Benfica (C)	30	23	5	2	58	18	+40	74	Qualification to Champions League group stage
2	Sporting CP	30	20	7	3	54	20	+34	67	Qualification to Champions League group stage
3	Porto	30	19	4	7	57	25	+32	61	Qualification to Champions League play-off round
4	Estoril	30	15	9	6	42	26	+16	54	Qualification to Europa League group stage
5	Nacional	30	11	12	7	43	33	+10	45	Qualification to Europa League play-off round

Source: LPFP (in Portuguese)
Rules for classification: 1) Points; 2) Head-to-head points; 3) Head-to-head goal difference; 4) Head-to-head away goals scored; 5) Goal difference; 6) Matches won; 7) Goals scored; 8) Play-off.
(Note: LPFP decided that only criteria 1, 5, 6 and 7 would be applied to establish the classification during the competition.)
(C) Champions

==== Results summary ====
Overall								Home						Away					
Pld	W	D	L	GF	GA	GD	Pts	W	D	L	GF	GA	GD	W	D	L	GF	GA	GD
30	23	5	2	58	18	+40	74	12	3	0	30	6	+24	11	2	2	28	12	+16

Last updated: 4 May 2014.
Source: Competitive matches

==== Results by round ====
Round	1	2	3	4	5	6	7	8	9	10	11	12	13	14	15	16	17	18	19	20	21	22	23	24	25	26	27	28	29	30
Ground	A	H	A	H	A	H	A	H	A	H	A	H	A	A	H	H	A	H	A	H	A	H	A	H	A	H	A	H	H	A
Result	L	W	D	W	W	D	W	W	W	W	W	D	W	W	W	W	D	W	W	W	W	W	W	W	W	W	W	W	D	L
Position	9	8	7	5	4	5	3	3	3	3	2	3	3	3	1	1	1	1	1	1	1	1	1	1	1	1	1	1	1	1

Source: Competitive matches
A = Away; H = Home; W = Win; D = Draw; L = Loss

==== Matches ====
Win Draw Loss

18 August 2013 1	Marítimo	2–1	Benfica	Funchal
17:45 WEST (UTC+01:00)	Soares (yellow card) 23'; Derley 45+1' (pen.); Sami 78'	Report	Amorim (yellow card) 30'; Artur (yellow card) 45'; Luisão (yellow card) 50'; Rodrigo 51'; Pereira (yellow card) 74'	Stadium: Estádio dos Barreiros; Attendance: 4,338; Referee: Jorge Sousa

25 August 2013 2	Benfica	2–1	Gil Vicente	Lisbon
17:45 WEST (UTC+01:00)	Marković 90+2'; Lima 90+3'	Report	Moraes (yellow card) 26'; Paulinho (yellow card) 26'; Viana 70'; Vilela (yellow card) 77'	Stadium: Estádio da Luz; Attendance: 37,381; Referee: Paulo Baptista

31 August 2013 3	Sporting CP	1–1	Benfica	Lisbon
20:00 WEST (UTC+01:00)	Rojo (yellow card) 9'; Montero 10' (yellow card) 50'; Carrillo (yellow card) 54'	Report	Matić (yellow card) 40'; Pereira (yellow card) 45+1'; Marković 64'; Amorim (yellow card) 85'	Stadium: Estádio de Alvalade; Attendance: 46,109; Referee: Hugo Miguel

14 September 2013 4	Benfica	3–1	Paços de Ferreira	Lisbon
18:15 WEST (UTC+01:00)	Pérez 4'; Garay 24', 52'; Pereira (yellow card) 83'	Report	Lopes (yellow card) 30'; Ribeiro 50'; Tony (yellow card) 54'; Oliveira (yellow card) 56'; Romeu (yellow card) 88'	Stadium: Estádio da Luz; Attendance: 34,575; Referee: Bruno Paixão

22 September 2013 5	Vitória de Guimarães	0–1	Benfica	Guimarães
18:00 WEST (UTC+01:00)	André (yellow card) 2'; Addy (yellow card) 26' (yellow-red card) 61'; Oliveira (yellow card) 38'; Matias (yellow card) 89'	Report	Siqueira (yellow card) 44'; Cardozo 72'; Matić (yellow card) 81'; Almeida (yellow card) 90'; Pérez (yellow card) 90+1'	Stadium: Estádio D. Afonso Henriques; Attendance: 20,576; Referee: Bruno Esteves

28 September 2013 6	Benfica	1–1	Belenenses	Lisbon
18:15 WEST (UTC+01:00)	Cardozo 17'; Matić (yellow card) 57'; Fejsa (yellow card) 90+5'	Report	Diakité 31'; Silva (yellow card) 75'; Jones (yellow card) 78'; Diawara (yellow card) 90+5'; Arsénio (yellow card) 90+6'	Stadium: Estádio da Luz; Attendance: 31,635; Referee: Jorge Tavares

6 October 2013 7	Estoril	1–2	Benfica	Estoril
20:15 WEST (UTC+01:00)	Babanco (yellow card) 12'; Gonçalves (yellow card) 45+1' (yellow-red card) 56'; João Pedro (yellow card) 49'; Sebá (yellow card) 64'; Balboa 73'	Report	Lima 10'; Pereira (yellow card) 13' (yellow-red card) 89'; Siqueira (yellow card) 19'; Matić (yellow card) 30'; Cardozo 71'; Gaitán (yellow card) 87'; Artur (yellow card) 90'	Stadium: Estádio António Coimbra da Mota; Attendance: 5,015; Referee: Manuel Mota

27 October 2013 8	Benfica	2–0	Nacional	Lisbon
17:15 WET (UTC+00:00)	Siqueira 15'; Cardozo 49'	Report	Aurélio (yellow card) 55'; Djaniny (yellow card) 68'	Stadium: Estádio da Luz; Attendance: 35,519; Referee: Jorge Ferreira

1 November 2013 9	Académica	0–3	Benfica	Coimbra
20:30 WET (UTC+00:00)		Report	Cardozo 33'; Marcelo Goiano 37' (o.g.); Pérez (yellow card) 72'; Marković 86'	Stadium: Estádio Cidade de Coimbra; Attendance: 8,551; Referee: Hugo Pacheco

23 November 2013 10	Benfica	1–0	Braga	Lisbon
18:15 WET (UTC+00:00)	Matić 73'; Garay (yellow card) 77'	Report	Silva (yellow card) 52'	Stadium: Estádio da Luz; Attendance: 35,764; Referee: Nuno Almeida

1 December 2013 11	Rio Ave	1–3	Benfica	Vila do Conde
17:45 WET (UTC+00:00)	Tarantini (yellow card) 26'; Ukra 57'; Wakaso (yellow card) 63' (yellow-red card) 68'	Report	Gaitán (yellow card) 34'; Rodrigo 38'; Garay (yellow card) 40'; Pereira (yellow card) 50'; Lima 63', 78'; Matić (yellow card) 89'	Stadium: Estádio do Rio Ave FC; Attendance: 6,023; Referee: Bruno Paixão

6 December 2013 12	Benfica	2–2	Arouca	Lisbon
20:15 WET (UTC+00:00)	Rodrigo 39' (yellow card) 59'; Lima 83' (pen.); Pérez (yellow card) 90+1'	Report	Simão 18' (yellow card) 19'; Serginho 73' (yellow card) 79'; Balliu (yellow card) 82'; Cássio (yellow card) 86'; Tinoco (yellow card) 90+4'	Stadium: Estádio da Luz; Attendance: 28,848; Referee: Rui Costa

15 December 2013 13	Olhanense	2–3	Benfica	Olhão
18:15 WET (UTC+00:00)	Balogun 7'; Pelé (yellow card) 23'; Regula 31'; Diakhite (yellow card) 81'	Report	Lima 19'; Matić 37'; Sulejmani 47'	Stadium: Estádio do Algarve; Attendance: 6,423; Referee: Vasco Santos

20 December 2013 14	Vitória de Setúbal	0–2	Benfica	Setúbal
21:00 WET (UTC+00:00)	Tiba (yellow card) 34'; Dani (yellow card) 68'; Cardozo (yellow card) 86'; Pedroso (yellow card) 90'	Report	Fejsa (yellow card) 44'; Rodrigo 54'; Lima 69' (pen.)	Stadium: Estádio do Bonfim; Attendance: 4,415; Referee: Paulo Baptista

12 January 2014 15	Benfica	2–0	Porto	Lisbon
16:00 WET (UTC+00:00)	Rodrigo 13'; Garay 53'; Matić (yellow card) 59'; Pérez (yellow card) 90+3'	Report	Martínez (yellow card) 57'; Quaresma (yellow card) 58'; Danilo (yellow card) 61' (yellow-red card) 75'; González (yellow card) 69'; Fernando (yellow card) 88'	Stadium: Estádio da Luz; Attendance: 62,508; Referee: Artur Soares Dias

19 January 2014 16	Benfica	2–0	Marítimo	Lisbon
17:00 WET (UTC+00:00)	Rodrigo 19', 35'; Marković (yellow card) 74'	Report	Gégé (yellow card) 86'	Stadium: Estádio da Luz; Attendance: 34,396; Referee: Hugo Miguel

1 February 2014 17	Gil Vicente	1–1	Benfica	Barcelos
19:15 WET (UTC+00:00)	Halisson (yellow card) 22'; Martins (yellow card) 24'; Brito (yellow card) 60'; Gonçalves 72'; Danielson (yellow card) 90+1'	Report	Siqueira (yellow card) 36' (yellow-red card) 57'; Lima 61'; Marković (yellow card) 63'; Rodrigo (yellow card) 66'; Gaitán (yellow card) 71'	Stadium: Estádio Cidade de Barcelos; Attendance: 8,792; Referee: Bruno Paixão

11 February 2014 (Note: Match originally scheduled for 9 February but postponed due to the security concerns after glass wool fell from the stadium's roof as a result of heavy weather conditions.) 18	Benfica	2–0	Sporting CP	Lisbon
20:15 WET (UTC+00:00)	Pérez (yellow card) 16' (goal) 76'; Fejsa (yellow card) 64'; Gaitán 28' (yellow card) 88'	Report	Rojo (yellow card) 80'; Maurício (yellow card) 88'; Cédric (yellow card) 90'	Stadium: Estádio da Luz; Attendance: 48,965; Referee: Marco Ferreira

16 February 2014 19	Paços de Ferreira	0–2	Benfica	Paços de Ferreira
17:00 WET (UTC+00:00)	Boaventura (yellow card) 38'; Tony (yellow card) 77'; Bebé (yellow card) 84'; Manuel José (yellow card) 89'	Report	Pereira (yellow card) 37'; Siqueira (yellow card) 44'; Garay (yellow card) 45+1' (goal) 53'; Gaitán (yellow card) 59'; Marković 68'; Amorim (yellow card) 81'	Stadium: Estádio da Mata Real; Attendance: 5,982; Referee: Duarte Gomes

24 February 2014 20	Benfica	1–0	Vitória de Guimarães	Lisbon
20:15 WET (UTC+00:00)	Marković 40'; Jardel (yellow card) 53'	Report	Addy (yellow card) 45+1'; Moreno (yellow card) 54'; Barrientos (yellow card) 63'	Stadium: Estádio da Luz; Attendance: 36,242; Referee: Nuno Almeida

2 March 2014 21	Belenenses	0–1	Benfica	Lisbon
17:00 WET (UTC+00:00)	Kay (yellow card) 32'; Ferreira (yellow card) 42'; Bruno China (yellow card) 53'; Rambé (yellow card) 74'; Fredy (yellow card) 80' (yellow-red card) 80'	Report	Gaitán 7'; Fejsa (yellow card) 65'	Stadium: Estádio do Restelo; Attendance: 10,118; Referee: Jorge Ferreira

9 March 2014 22	Benfica	2–0	Estoril	Lisbon
17:00 WET (UTC+00:00)	Luisão 6'; Fejsa (yellow card) 8'; Rodrigo 19'; Pereira (yellow card) 27'	Report	Evandro (yellow card) 22'; Balboa (yellow card) 40'	Stadium: Estádio da Luz; Attendance: 56,730; Referee: Paulo Baptista

17 March 2014 23	Nacional	2–4	Benfica	Funchal
20:00 WET (UTC+00:00)	Candeias 6' (pen.); Marçal (yellow card) 12'; Ghazal (yellow card) 14'; Gomaa (yellow card) 30'; Rodrigues (yellow card) 65'; João (yellow card) 68'; Djaniny 80'	Report	Luisão (yellow card) 5'; Lima 24'; Siqueira (yellow card) 31'; Rodrigo 33'; Garay 43', 88'; Gaitán (yellow card) 75'	Stadium: Estádio da Madeira; Attendance: 5,142; Referee: Manuel Mota

23 March 2014 24	Benfica	3–0	Académica	Lisbon
18:00 WET (UTC+00:00)	Lima 11', 27'; Pérez 59'	Report	Agra (yellow card) 15'; Marcos Paulo (yellow card) 49'	Stadium: Estádio da Luz; Attendance: 49,320; Referee: Rui Costa

30 March 2014 25	Braga	0–1	Benfica	Braga
17:00 WEST (UTC+01:00)	Dabó (yellow card) 13'; Fortuna (yellow card) 56'; Luíz Carlos (yellow card) 64'; Santos (yellow card) 76'; Miljković (yellow card) 90'	Report	Lima 13'; Siqueira (yellow card) 15'; Fejsa (yellow card) 57'; Oblak (yellow card) 90+3'	Stadium: Estádio Municipal de Braga; Attendance: 18,360; Referee: Pedro Proença

7 April 2014 26	Benfica	4–0	Rio Ave	Lisbon
20:00 WEST (UTC+01:00)	Rodrigo 17'; Pérez (yellow card) 28'; Gaitán 29'; Luisão (yellow card) 67'; Cardozo 77' (pen.), 90+2' (pen.)	Report	Filipe Augusto (yellow card) 2'; Edimar (yellow card) 8'; Santos (yellow card) 20'; Lopes (yellow card) 38'; Marcelo (yellow card) 58' (yellow-red card) 90+1'; Braga (yellow card) 76'; Tarantini (yellow card) 86'; Ederson (yellow card) 90'	Stadium: Estádio da Luz; Attendance: 46,004; Referee: Cosme Machado

13 April 2014 27	Arouca	0–2	Benfica	Aveiro (Note: The match between Arouca and Benfica was scheduled to be played at the Estádio Municipal de Arouca, but due to disagreements between Arouca and the stadium's owners, the match venue was changed to the Estádio Municipal de Aveiro.)
17:00 WEST (UTC+01:00)	Tinoco (yellow card) 44'; Galo (yellow card) 83'	Report	Almeida (yellow card) 42'; Rodrigo 45+1'; Gaitán 54'	Stadium: Estádio Municipal de Aveiro; Attendance: 28,200; Referee: Hugo Miguel

20 April 2014 28	Benfica	2–0	Olhanense	Lisbon
18:00 WEST (UTC+01:00)	Lima 57', 60' (yellow card) 61'	Report	Luís Filipe (yellow card) 58'; Duarte (yellow card) 58'; Celestino (yellow card) 58'; Sampirisi (yellow card) 66'; Diakhite (yellow card) 83'	Stadium: Estádio da Luz; Attendance: 63,982; Referee: Carlos Xistra

4 May 2014 29	Benfica	1–1	Vitória de Setúbal	Lisbon
18:00 WEST (UTC+01:00)	Gomes 59'; Pérez (yellow card) 73'; Pereira (yellow card) 75'; Gaitán (yellow card) 86'	Report	Martins 75' (pen.); Tavares (yellow card) 82'; Ozéia (yellow card) 90'	Stadium: Estádio da Luz; Attendance: 52,325; Referee: Duarte Gomes

10 May 2014 30	Porto	2–1	Benfica	Porto
18:00 WEST (UTC+01:00)	Pereira 4'; Reyes (yellow card) 25'; Martínez 39' (pen.); Alex Sandro (yellow card) 74'; Danilo (yellow card) 90+2'	Report	Pérez 26' (pen.); Almeida (yellow card) 37'; Jardel (yellow card) 40'; Funes Mori (yellow card) 90+2'	Stadium: Estádio do Dragão; Attendance: 25,121; Referee: Rui Costa

=== Taça de Portugal ===
==== Third round ====
19 October 2013 Third round	Cinfães	0–1	Benfica	Cinfães
14:30 WEST (UTC+01:00)	Hélio (yellow card) 55'; Miguel Moreira (yellow card) 61'; Miguel Mendes (yellow card) 70'; Ruizinho (yellow card) 79'		Cavaleiro (yellow card) 20'; John 52'; Đuričić (yellow card) 57'; Vitória (yellow card) 64'	Stadium: Estádio Municipal Prof. Cerveira Pinto; Attendance: 7,000; Referee: Rui Costa

==== Fourth round ====
9 November 2013 Fourth round	Benfica	4–3 (a.e.t.)	Sporting CP	Lisbon
19:45 WET (UTC+00:00)	Cardozo 12', 42', 45'; Amorim (yellow card) 29'; Marković (yellow card) 56'; Sílvio (yellow card) 58'; Almeida (yellow card) 69'; Artur (yellow card) 73'; Garay (yellow card) 90+3'; Luisão 97'	Report	Capel 37'; Rojo (yellow card) 59' (yellow-red card) 114'; Maurício 62' (yellow card) 80'; Carrillo (yellow card) 82'; Slimani 90+2' (yellow card) 108'	Stadium: Estádio da Luz; Attendance: 47,156; Referee: Duarte Gomes

==== Fifth round ====
4 January 2014 Fifth round	Benfica	5–0	Gil Vicente	Lisbon
20:15 WET (UTC+00:00)	Rodrigo 3', 38'; Marković 16'; Lima 58' (pen.), 90+2'	Report	Pimenta (yellow card) 6'; Viana (yellow card) 12'; Gabriel (yellow card) 50'; Patterson (yellow card) 57'; Paulinho (yellow card) 60'; Danielson (yellow card) 80'	Stadium: Estádio da Luz; Attendance: 15,504; Referee: Nuno Almeida

==== Quarter-finals ====
5 February 2014 Quarter-final	Penafiel	0–1	Benfica	Penafiel
19:00 WET (UTC+00:00)	Fontes (yellow card) 32'; João Pedro (yellow card) 68'	Report	Sulejmani 84'; Artur (yellow card) 87'	Stadium: Estádio Municipal 25 de Abril; Attendance: 5,000; Referee: João Capela

==== Semi-finals ====
26 March 2014 First leg	Porto	1–0	Benfica	Porto
21:00 WET (UTC+00:00)	Martínez 6' (yellow card) 90+2'; Defour (yellow card) 25'; Herrera (yellow card) 49'; Fernando (yellow card) 62'; Danilo (yellow card) 90+3'	Report	Pereira (yellow card) 19'; Sílvio (yellow card) 59'	Stadium: Estádio do Dragão; Attendance: 34,499; Referee: Marco Ferreira

16 April 2014 Second leg	Benfica	3–1 (3–2 agg.)	Porto	Lisbon
20:45 WEST (UTC+01:00)	Salvio 17'; Siqueira (yellow card) 25' (yellow-red card) 28'; Pérez 58' (pen.); Jardel (yellow card) 78'; Gomes 80' (yellow card) 82'; Artur (yellow card) 90+2'	Report	Quaresma (yellow card) 22' (yellow-red card) 88'; Danilo (yellow card) 48'; Varela 52' (yellow card) 70'; Reyes (yellow card) 58'; Herrera (yellow card) 64'; Defour (yellow card) 75'	Stadium: Estádio da Luz; Attendance: 45,380; Referee: Pedro Proença

==== Final ====
18 May 2014 Final	Benfica	1–0	Rio Ave	Oeiras
17:15 WEST (UTC+01:00)	Gaitán 20'; Lima (yellow card) 54'	Report	Santos (yellow card) 30'; Ribeiro (yellow card) 45+1'; Braga (yellow card) 58'	Stadium: Estádio Nacional; Attendance: 37,150; Referee: Carlos Xistra; Man of the Match: Nicolás Gaitán

=== Taça da Liga ===
==== Group stage ====
Pos	Team	Pld	W	D	L	GF	GA	GD	Pts	Qualification
1	Benfica	3	3	0	0	4	0	+4	9	Advance to knockout phase
2	Nacional	3	1	1	1	4	3	+1	4	
3	Gil Vicente	3	0	2	1	2	4	−2	2	
4	Leixões	3	0	1	2	0	4	−4	1	

30 December 2013 1	Nacional	0–1	Benfica	Funchal
20:45 WET (UTC+00:00)	Mexer (yellow card) 66'; Candeias (yellow card) 67'; Rodrigues (yellow card) 72'; Ghazal (yellow card) 90+2'	Report	Pérez (yellow card) 23'; Mexer 32' (o.g.); Siqueira (yellow card) 90+2'	Stadium: Estádio da Madeira; Attendance: 3,427; Referee: Carlos Xistra

15 January 2014 2	Benfica	2–0	Leixões	Lisbon
20:45 WET (UTC+00:00)	Đuričić 27'; Rodrigo (yellow card) 82'; Cavaleiro 87'	Report	Lenho (yellow card) 82'	Stadium: Estádio da Luz; Attendance: 9,524; Referee: Manuel Oliveira

25 January 2014 3	Benfica	1–0	Gil Vicente	Lisbon
16:00 WET (UTC+00:00)	Vitória (yellow card) 36'; Sulejmani 56'; Đuričić (yellow card) 69'	Report	Vinha (yellow card) 29'; Scapolan (yellow card) 42'; Pimenta (yellow card) 54'	Stadium: Estádio do Restelo (Note: The match between Benfica and Gil Vicente was scheduled to be played at the Estádio da Luz, but due to Benfica's ground undergoing resurfacing work, the match venue was changed to the Estádio do Restelo.); Attendance: 6,664; Referee: Bruno Esteves

==== Knockout phase ====
===== Semi-finals =====
27 April 2014 (Note: Match originally scheduled for 12 February but postponed due to the disciplinary investigation conducted against Porto regarding the delayed start of Porto's final match against Marítimo in the third round.) Semi-finals	Porto	0–0 (3–4 p)	Benfica	Porto
18:15 WEST (UTC+01:00)	Danilo (yellow card) 82'	Report	Vitória (red card) 32'; Almeida (yellow card) 81'	Stadium: Estádio do Dragão; Attendance: 26,104; Referee: Marco Ferreira
	Penalties
	Quintero (penalty scored); Martínez (penalty missed); Ghilas (penalty scored); Maicon (penalty missed); Varela (penalty scored); Fernando (penalty missed)		(penalty scored) Siqueira; (penalty missed) Garay; (penalty scored) Jardel; (penalty missed) Gomes; (penalty scored) Pérez; (penalty scored) Cavaleiro

===== Final =====
7 May 2014 Final	Benfica	2–0	Rio Ave	Leiria
20:30 WEST (UTC+01:00)	Amorim (yellow card) 35'; Rodrigo 41'; Luisão 78'; Salvio (yellow card) 88'	Report	Lima (yellow card) 70'; Tarantini (yellow card) 77'	Stadium: Estádio Dr. Magalhães Pessoa; Attendance: 23,119; Referee: Hugo Miguel; Man of the Match: Rodrigo

=== UEFA Champions League ===
Benfica began their Champions League campaign in the group stage after achieving a top-two finish in the league's previous season. Courtesy of their UEFA coefficient, they were seeded in Pot 1 for the draw, which took place in Monaco in late August 2013. The final of the competition is to be played at Benfica's home stadium Estádio da Luz.

==== Group stage ====
Pos	Team	Pld	W	D	L	GF	GA	GD	Pts	Qualification	PAR	OLY	BEN	AND
1	(France) Paris Saint-Germain	6	4	1	1	16	5	+11	13	Advance to knockout phase	—	2–1	3–0	1–1
2	(Greece) Olympiacos	6	3	1	2	10	8	+2	10 (Note: Head-to-head points: Olympiacos 4, Benfica 1.)	Advance to knockout phase	1–4	—	1–0	3–1
3	(Portugal) Benfica	6	3	1	2	8	8	0	10	Transfer to Europa League	2–1	1–1	—	2–0
4	(Belgium) Anderlecht	6	0	1	5	4	17	−13	1		0–5	0–3	2–3	—

Source: UEFA
Notes:

17 September 2013 1	Benfica (Portugal)	2–0	(Belgium) Anderlecht	Lisbon, Portugal
19:45 WEST (UTC+01:00)	Đuričić 4'; Pérez (yellow card) 27'; Luisão 30'	Report	Bruno (yellow card) 21'; De Zeeuw (yellow card) 34'; Mitrović (yellow card) 70'; Kljestan (yellow card) 76'; Suárez (yellow card) 89'	Stadium: Estádio da Luz; Attendance: 29,393; Referee: Manuel Gräfe (Germany)

2 October 2013 2	Paris Saint-Germain (France)	3–0	(Portugal) Benfica	Paris, France
20:45 CEST (UTC+02:00)	Ibrahimović 5', 31'; Marquinhos 25'; Van der Wiel (yellow card) 36'; Alex (yellow card) 47'	Report	Gaitán (yellow card) 32'	Stadium: Parc des Princes; Attendance: 44,732; Referee: Nicola Rizzoli (Italy)

23 October 2013 3	Benfica (Portugal)	1–1	(Greece) Olympiacos	Lisbon, Portugal
19:45 WEST (UTC+01:00)	Pérez (yellow card) 55'; Gaitán (yellow card) 62'; Cardozo 83'	Report	Domínguez 29'; Fuster (yellow card) 36'; Weiss (yellow card) 42'; Mitroglou (yellow card) 59'; Maniatis (yellow card) 84'	Stadium: Estádio da Luz; Attendance: 38,149; Referee: Alberto Undiano Mallenco (Spain)

5 November 2013 4	Olympiacos (Greece)	1–0	(Portugal) Benfica	Piraeus, Greece
20:45 CET (UTC+01:00)	Manolas 13'; Yatabaré (yellow card) 38'; Roberto (yellow card) 85'; N'Dinga (yellow card) 89'; Domínguez (yellow card) 90+2'	Report	Pereira (yellow card) 33'; Matić (yellow card) 37'; Amorim (yellow card) 42'	Stadium: Karaiskakis Stadium; Attendance: 31,461; Referee: Damir Skomina (Slovenia)

27 November 2013 5	Anderlecht (Belgium)	2–3	(Portugal) Benfica	Anderlecht, Belgium
20:45 CET (UTC+01:00)	Mbemba 18'; Bruno (yellow card) 29' (goal) 77'; Nuytinck (yellow card) 49'; Mitrović (yellow card) 88'	Report	Matić 34'; Mbemba 52' (o.g.); Almeida (yellow card) 78'; Rodrigo 90'; Artur (yellow card) 90+2'	Stadium: Constant Vanden Stock Stadium; Attendance: 16,780; Referee: Daniele Orsato (Italy)

10 December 2013 6	Benfica (Portugal)	2–1	(France) Paris Saint-Germain	Lisbon, Portugal
19:45 WET (UTC+00:00)	Pereira (yellow card) 30'; Lima 45' (pen.); Gaitán 58'; Sílvio (yellow card) 87'	Report	Cavani 37'; Motta (yellow card) 50'; Ménez (yellow card) 70'; Rabiot (yellow card) 77'	Stadium: Estádio da Luz; Attendance: 30,089; Referee: Mark Clattenburg (England)

=== UEFA Europa League ===
==== Knockout phase ====
===== Round of 32 =====
20 February 2014 First leg	PAOK (Greece)	0–1	(Portugal) Benfica	Thessaloniki, Greece
20:00 EET (UTC+02:00)	Kaçe (yellow card) 5'; Lazăr (yellow card) 27'; Maduro (yellow card) 54'; Stoch (yellow card) 85'	Report	Gomes (yellow card) 45'; Lima 59'	Stadium: Toumba Stadium; Attendance: 24,670; Referee: Wolfgang Stark (Germany)

27 February 2013 Second leg	Benfica (Portugal)	3–0 (4–0 agg.)	(Greece) PAOK	Lisbon, Portugal
20:05 WET (UTC+00:00)	Gaitán 70'; Sílvio (yellow card) 76'; Lima 78' (pen.); Marković 79'	Report	Kitsiou (yellow card) 39'; Katsouranis (red card) 69'	Stadium: Estádio da Luz; Attendance: 31,058; Referee: Szymon Marciniak (Poland)

===== Round of 16 =====
13 March 2014 First leg	Tottenham Hotspur (England)	1–3	(Portugal) Benfica	London, England
20:05 WET (UTC+00:00)	Sandro (yellow card) 9'; Eriksen 64'; Vertonghen (yellow card) 81'	Report	Rodrigo 30'; Luisão 58', 84'; Sílvio (yellow card) 63'; Amorim (yellow card) 81'	Stadium: White Hart Lane; Attendance: 34,283; Referee: Jonas Eriksson (Sweden)

20 March 2014 Second leg	Benfica (Portugal)	2–2 (5–3 agg.)	(England) Tottenham Hotspur	Lisbon, Portugal
18:00 WET (UTC+00:00)	Luisão (yellow card) 10'; Garay 34'; Pérez (yellow card) 90'; Lima 90+5' (pen.)	Report	Chadli 78', 79'; Naughton (yellow card) 90+1'	Stadium: Estádio da Luz; Attendance: 40,990; Referee: Damir Skomina (Slovenia)

===== Quarter-finals =====
3 April 2014 First leg	AZ (Netherlands)	0–1	(Portugal) Benfica	Alkmaar, Netherlands
21:05 CEST (UTC+02:00)	Johansson (yellow card) 78'	Report	Salvio 48'; Gaitán (yellow card) 61'; Siqueira (yellow card) 89'; Salvio (yellow card) 90+2'; Pereira (yellow card) 90+5'	Stadium: AFAS Stadion; Attendance: 16,906; Referee: Svein Oddvar Moen (Norway)

10 April 2014 Second leg	Benfica (Portugal)	2–0 (3–0 agg.)	(Netherlands) AZ	Lisbon, Portugal
20:05 WEST (UTC+01:00)	Salvio (yellow card) 30'; Rodrigo 39', 71'; Gomes (yellow card) 73'	Report	Berghuis (yellow card) 22'	Stadium: Estádio da Luz; Attendance: 35,723; Referee: Pavel Královec (Czech Republic)

===== Semi-finals =====
24 April 2014 First leg	Benfica (Portugal)	2–1	(Italy) Juventus	Lisbon, Portugal
20:05 WEST (UTC+01:00)	Garay 3'; Gomes (yellow card) 34'; Artur (yellow card) 71'; Lima 84'; Almeida (yellow card) 88'	Report	Pogba (yellow card) 45'; Tevez 73'	Stadium: Estádio da Luz; Attendance: 55,779; Referee: Cüneyt Çakır (Turkey)

1 May 2014 Second leg	Juventus (Italy)	0–0 (1–2 agg.)	(Portugal) Benfica	Turin, Italy
21:05 CEST (UTC+02:00)	Asamoah (yellow card) 64'	Report	Rodrigo (yellow card) 56'; Pérez (yellow card) 61' (yellow-red card) 67'; Oblak (yellow card) 82'; Salvio (yellow card) 90+6'	Stadium: Juventus Stadium; Attendance: 40,134; Referee: Mark Clattenburg (England)

===== Final =====
14 May 2014 Final	Sevilla (Spain)	0–0 (a.e.t.) (4–2 p)	(Portugal) Benfica	Turin, Italy
20:45 CEST (UTC+02:00)	Fazio (yellow card) 11'; Moreno (yellow card) 13'; Coke (yellow card) 98'	Report	Siqueira (yellow card) 30'; Almeida (yellow card) 100'	Stadium: Juventus Stadium; Attendance: 33,120; Referee: Felix Brych (Germany); Man of the Match: Ivan Rakitić
	Penalties
	Bacca (penalty scored); Mbia (penalty scored); Coke (penalty scored); Gameiro (penalty scored)		(penalty scored) Lima; (penalty missed) Cardozo; (penalty missed) Rodrigo; (penalty scored) Luisão

=== Overall record ===
Competition	First match	Last match	Record								
Competition	First match	Last match	G	W	D	L	GF	GA	GD	Win %	Source
Primeira Liga	18 August 2013	11 May 2014	30	23	5	2	58	18	+40	76.67	
Taça de Portugal	19 October 2013	18 May 2014	7	6	0	1	15	5	+10	85.71	
Taça da Liga	30 December 2013	7 May 2014	5	4	1	0	6	0	+6	80.00	
Champions League	19 September 2013	10 December 2013	6	3	1	2	8	8	+0	50.00	
Europa League	20 February 2014	14 May 2014	9	6	3	0	14	4	+10	66.67	
Total			57	42	10	5	101	35	+66	73.68	

== Player statistics ==
No.	Pos	Nat	Player	Total		Primeira Liga		Portuguese Cup		League Cup		Europe	
No.	Pos	Nat	Player	Apps	Goals	Apps	Goals	Apps	Goals	Apps	Goals	Apps	Goals
Goalkeepers
1	GK	(Brazil) BRA	Artur	30	0	14	0	4	0	1	0	11	0
13	GK	(Portugal) POR	Paulo Lopes	3	0	2	0	0	0	1	0	0	0
41	GK	(Slovenia) SLO	Jan Oblak	26	0	16	0	3	0	3	0	4	0
Defenders
3	DF	(Portugal) POR	Steven Vitória	5	0	1	0	1	0	3	0	0	0
4	DF	(Brazil) BRA	Luisão	49	6	28	1	5	1	1	1	15	3
12	DF	(Brazil) BRA	Bruno Cortês	7	0	6	0	1	0	0	0	0	0
14	DF	(Uruguay) URU	Maxi Pereira	43	0	25	0	5	0	2	0	11	0
16	DF	(Brazil) BRA	Guilherme Siqueira	33	1	18	1	2	0	3	0	10	0
22	DF	(Serbia) SRB	Stefan Mitrović	0	0	0	0	0	0	0	0	0	0
24	DF	(Argentina) ARG	Ezequiel Garay	49	8	27	6	5	0	3	0	14	2
28	DF	(Portugal) POR	Sílvio	22	0	8	0	4	0	3	0	7	0
33	DF	(Brazil) BRA	Jardel	14	0	6	0	3	0	4	0	1	0
34	DF	(Portugal) POR	André Almeida	26	0	10	0	3	0	4	0	9	0
70	DF	(Portugal) POR	João Cancelo (B)	2	0	1	0	0	0	1	0	0	0
Midfielders
5	MF	(Serbia) SRB	Ljubomir Fejsa	27	0	16	0	2	0	2	0	7	0
6	MF	(Portugal) POR	Ruben Amorim	37	0	17	0	6	0	5	0	9	0
8	MF	(Serbia) SRB	Miralem Sulejmani	26	3	11	1	2	1	3	1	10	0
10	MF	(Serbia) SRB	Filip Đuričić	22	2	11	0	3	0	2	1	6	1
15	MF	(Netherlands) NED	Ola John	9	1	5	0	1	1	1	0	2	0
18	MF	(Argentina) ARG	Eduardo Salvio	22	2	12	0	3	1	1	0	6	1
20	MF	(Argentina) ARG	Nicolás Gaitán	43	8	26	4	5	1	2	1	10	2
21	MF	(Serbia) SRB	Nemanja Matić	22	3	14	2	2	0	0	0	6	1
30	MF	(Portugal) POR	André Gomes	23	2	7	1	4	1	3	0	9	0
35	MF	(Argentina) ARG	Enzo Pérez	47	5	28	4	4	1	3	0	12	0
50	MF	(Serbia) SRB	Lazar Marković	49	7	26	5	6	1	4	0	13	1
90	MF	(Portugal) POR	Ivan Cavaleiro	19	1	8	0	3	0	3	1	5	0
92	MF	(Sweden) SWE	Victor Lindelöf (B)	2	0	1	0	1	0	0	0	0	0
94	MF	(Portugal) POR	Bernardo Silva (B)	3	0	1	0	1	0	1	0	0	0
Strikers
7	FW	(Paraguay) PAR	Óscar Cardozo	32	11	15	7	5	3	1	0	11	1
9	FW	(Argentina) ARG	Rogelio Funes Mori (B)	5	0	2	0	1	0	2	0	0	0
11	FW	(Brazil) BRA	Lima	51	21	28	14	6	2	4	0	13	5
19	FW	(Spain) ESP	Rodrigo	43	18	26	11	5	2	3	1	9	4
67	FW	(Portugal) POR	Hélder Costa (B)	1	0	0	0	0	0	1	0	0	0

(B) – Benfica B player
