= Ezequiel Garay =

Argentine footballer (born 1986)

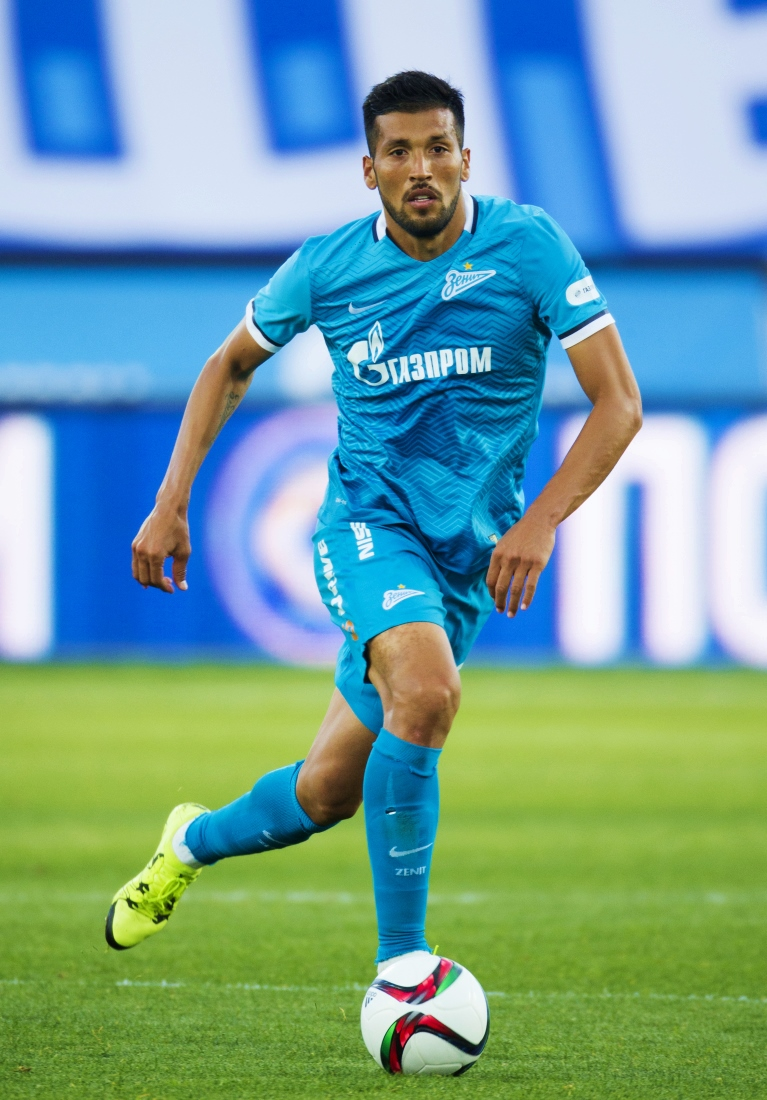
- Garay with Zenit in 2015

Personal information
- Full name: Ezequiel Marcelo Garay González
- Date of birth: 10 October 1986 (age 40)
- Place of birth: Rosario, Argentina
- Height: 1.88 m (6 ft 2 in)
- Position: Centre-back

Youth career
- Newell's Old Boys

Senior career*
Years	Team	Apps	(Gls)
2004–2005	Newell's Old Boys	13	(1)
2005–2008	Racing Santander	60	(12)
2008–2011	Real Madrid	25	(1)
2008–2009	→ Racing Santander (loan)	24	(2)
2011–2014	Benfica	78	(9)
2014–2016	Zenit Saint Petersburg	50	(3)
2016–2020	Valencia	92	(6)
Total		342	(34)

International career
2003	Argentina U17	6	(2)
2008	Argentina U23	9	(0)
2007–2015	Argentina	32	(0)
Medal record
Men's football
Representing Argentina
FIFA World Cup
Runner-up	2014 Brazil	Team
Copa América
Runner-up	2015 Chile	Team
Olympic Games
Gold medal – first place	2008 Beijing	Team
FIFA World Youth Championship
Winner	2005 Netherlands	U-20 Team
- * Club domestic league appearances and goals

Ezequiel Marcelo Garay González (Spanish pronunciation: [eseˈkjel ɣaˈɾaj]; born 10 October 1986) is an Argentine former professional footballer who played as a central defender.

He started his career with Newell's Old Boys but moved to Spain at the age of 19, going on to amass La Liga totals of 201 games and 21 goals over ten seasons with Racing de Santander, Real Madrid and Valencia. In 2011 he signed with Benfica, winning four major titles, most notably the domestic treble in 2013–14.

Garay represented Argentina at the 2014 World Cup and two Copa América tournaments.

== Club career ==
=== Early career ===
Garay was born in Rosario, Santa Fe. At the early age of 18, he made his professional debut for hometown's Newell's Old Boys, in the Primera División. His first match was against Club de Gimnasia y Esgrima La Plata, as the local team eventually won the Apertura championship in the 2004–05 season.

Garay made another 12 league appearances for Newell's, scoring his only goal for the club in the local derby against Rosario Central, a 2–1 win.

=== Racing Santander ===
Garay joined La Liga club Racing de Santander in December 2005, helping with seven complete matches as the Cantabria side barely avoided relegation. His first full season was nothing short of spectacular as he netted nine league goals in 31 games, being the second top scorer in his position in Europe's major leagues only behind Inter Milan's Marco Materazzi (ten); against Real Madrid only, he scored three times – 2–1 home victory (both through penalties, as well as five other goals) and 3–1 away loss – as Racing eventually finished tenth, their best since returning to the top flight in 2002.

On 19 March 2008, in the semi-finals of the Copa del Rey against Getafe CF, Garay suffered a serious leg injury which put him out of action for the remainder of the campaign. He still scored three goals in 22 matches with his team finishing in a best-ever sixth position, qualifying for the first time to the UEFA Cup– one of those came on 30 September 2007 in a 1–0 win at UD Almería.

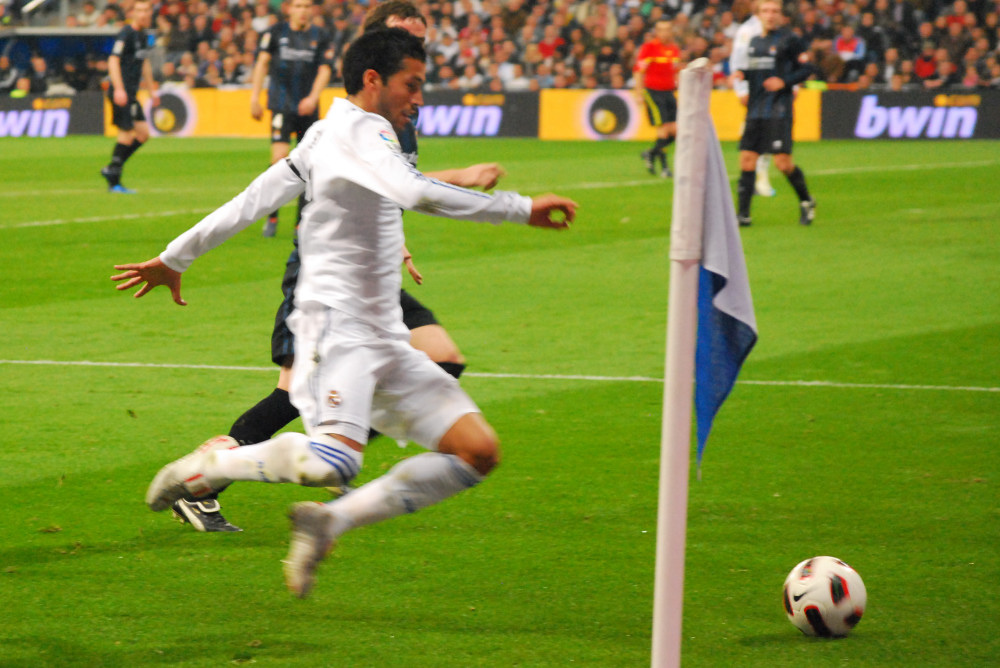
Garay playing for Real Madrid against Real Sociedad in 2011

=== Real Madrid ===
On 18 May 2008, Racing sold Garay to Real Madrid, but received the player again on a season-long loan. Returned in July 2009, he made his league debut for the latter on 29 August, in the opening game of the campaign against Deportivo de La Coruña, a 3–2 home win. On 12 December, after coming on as a substitute for the severely injured Pepe, he scored his first goal for the club, heading in a free kick from Xabi Alonso to make it 3–2 at Valencia CF with six minutes to go.

Garay was only fourth-choice stopper in 2010–11 under new manager José Mourinho, only making five league appearances, adding two in the Spanish Cup (including one minute in the final against FC Barcelona, a 1–0 extra-time victory).

=== Benfica ===
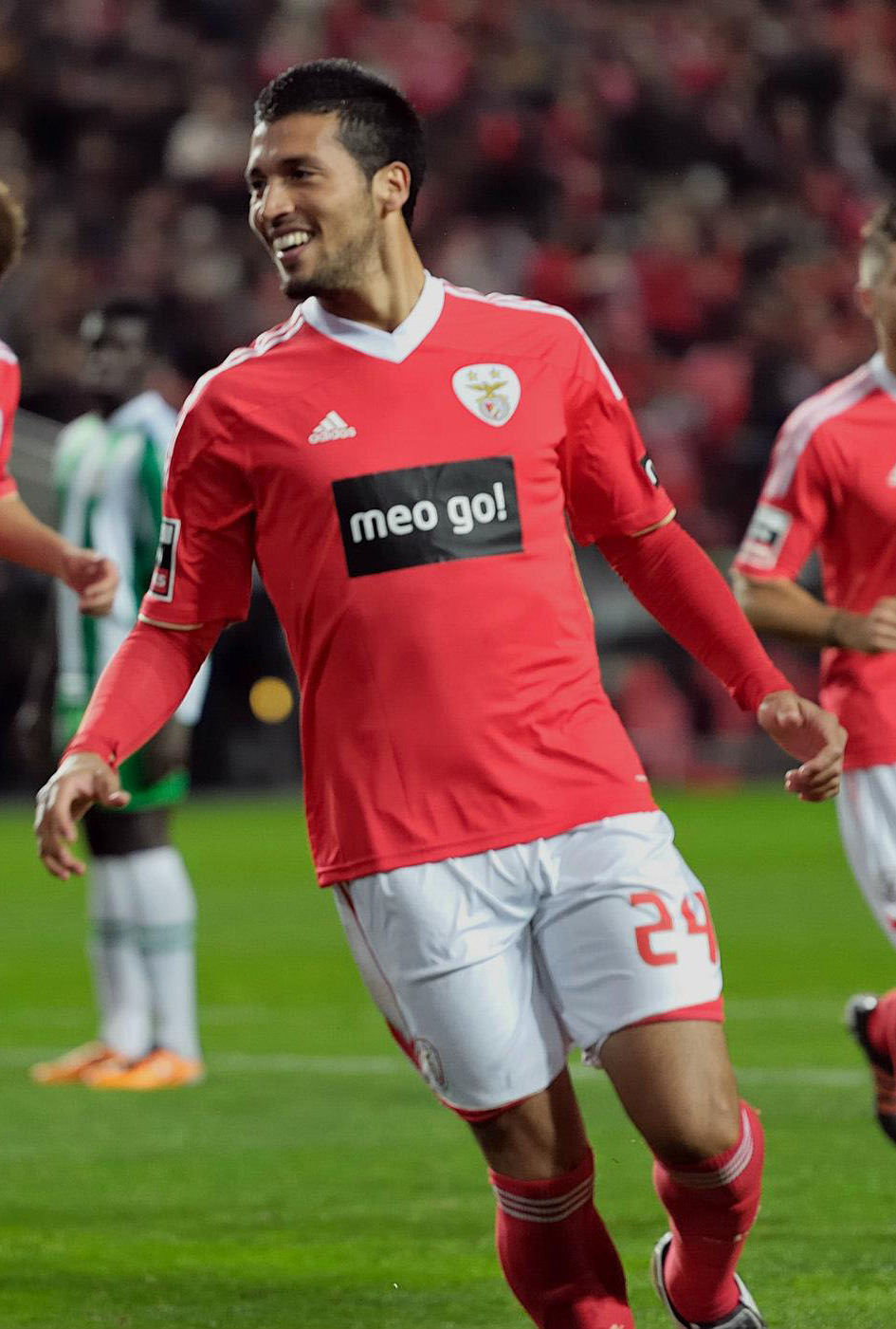
Garay with Benfica in 2011

On 5 July 2011, Garay transferred to S.L. Benfica for a fee of €5.5 million, signing a four-year contract; initially part of the deal that sent Fábio Coentrão to Real Madrid, Garay eventually signed a separate deal. Real Madrid also remained eligible for 50% of any transfer fee Benfica would receive, and the latter also sold part of his rights to Benfica Stars Fund for €1.175 million, making the club owner of 40%.

During his spell in Lisbon, Garay shared teams with a host of compatriots, and often partnered with Luisão in central defence. On 24 April 2014, he scored his eighth official goal of the season, his team's first in a 2–1 home win over Juventus FC in the first leg of the Europa League semi-finals.

=== Zenit ===
On 25 June 2014, Russian club FC Zenit Saint Petersburg signed Garay in a transfer totalling €6 million, with Benfica receiving €2.4 million for their 40% part of the player's rights.

He appeared in 42 games in all competitions in his first season, helping the team to their fourth Russian Premier League championship.

=== Valencia ===
On 31 August 2016, Garay joined Valencia for a fee reported at around €20 million. He scored four goals in his debut campaign, but his side could only finish 12th.

Garay was on the starting XI in the 2019 Copa del Rey final, a 2–1 defeat of Barcelona. In February 2020, after suffering a cruciate ligament injury to his right knee which would sideline him for up to six months, he asked to be released so that another player in his position could be signed.

Having been without a club for over one year, the 34-year-old Garay announced his retirement on 16 July 2021. He revealed that he had been suffering with a long-term injury since 2018 and had had offers since leaving Valencia, but felt that it would have been dishonest to accept them since the injury situation would have meant he would only have been available for one game out of every three.

== International career ==
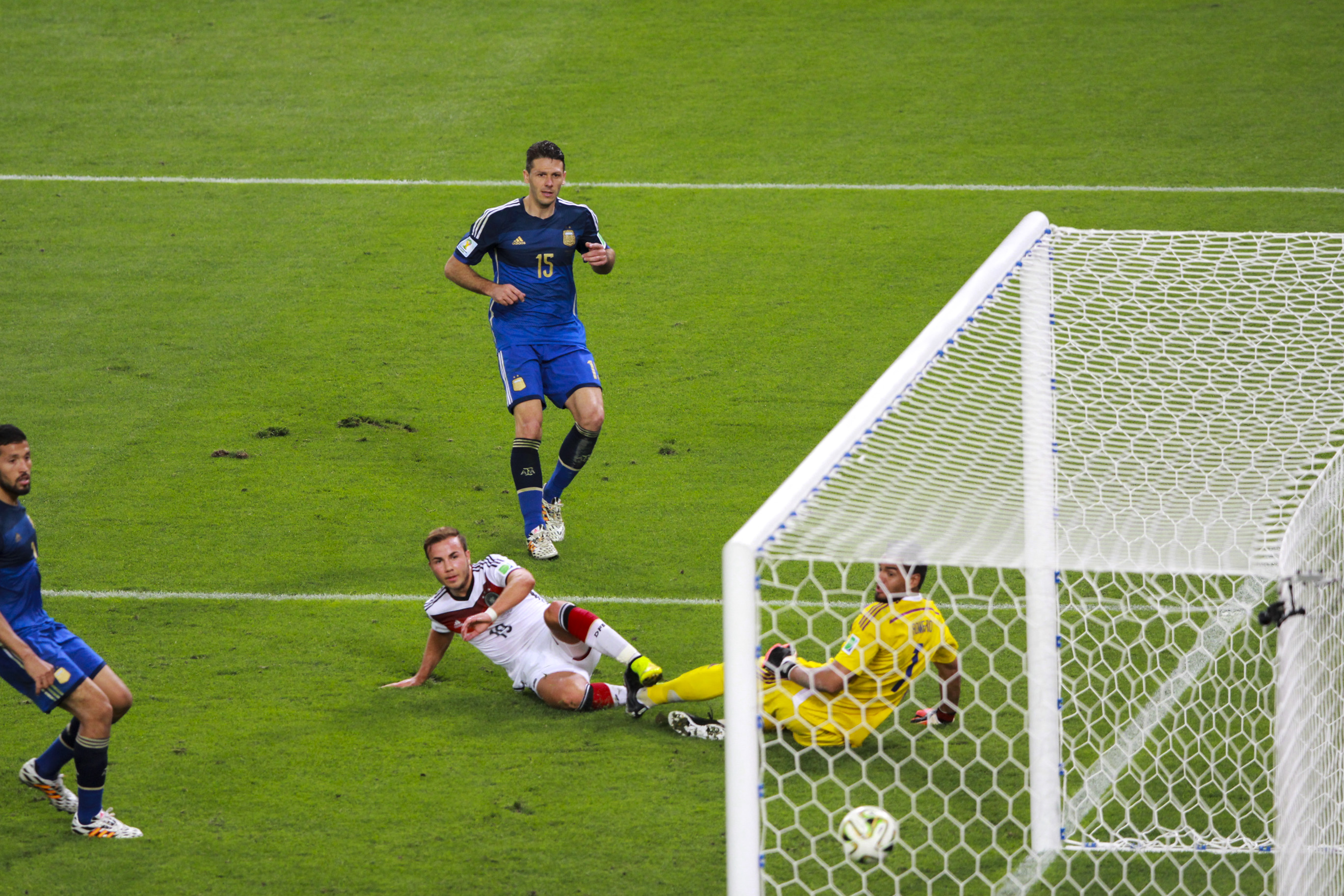
Mario Götze scoring the winning goal for Germany as Garay (left), Martín Demichelis (centre) and goalkeeper Sergio Romero look on during the 2014 World Cup final

In 2005, Garay helped the Argentine under-20s win the FIFA U-20 World Cup in the Netherlands by defeating Nigeria in the final. That side also included Sergio Agüero, Fernando Gago, Lionel Messi and Oscar Ustari.

Garay earned his first cap for the senior team cap in a friendly against Norway, a 2–1 loss on 22 August 2007. He had previously been called in May by coach Alfio Basile to a series of friendlies prior to the 2007 Copa América, but injury prevented him from appearing in those matches and the official competition.

Garay was selected by new national team manager Sergio Batista to the 2011 Copa América. He was also picked by the following coach, Alejandro Sabella, for his 2014 FIFA World Cup squad, making his debut in the competition on 15 June by featuring the full 90 minutes in a 2–1 group stage win over Bosnia and Herzegovina. He was first-choice in all the remaining games and, on 9 July, converted his penalty shootout attempt against the Netherlands (0–0 after 120 minutes) to send his country to the final for the first time in 24 years.

Garay made the list for the 2015 Copa América, starting in the team's opening fixture with Paraguay in La Serena (2–2).

== Personal life ==
On 15 March 2020, Garay became the first La Liga player to test positive for COVID-19. On 21 September 2021, shortly following his retirement, he was reported to have started real estate development in Valencia.

== Career statistics ==
=== Club ===
Appearances and goals by club, season and competition
Club	Season	League			National Cup		League Cup		Continental		Other		Total	
Club	Season	Division	Apps	Goals	Apps	Goals	Apps	Goals	Apps	Goals	Apps	Goals	Apps	Goals
Newell's Old Boys	2004–05	Argentine Primera División	1	0	—								1	0
Newell's Old Boys	2005–06	Argentine Primera División	12	1	—								12	1
Newell's Old Boys	Total		13	1	—								13	1
Racing Santander	2005–06	La Liga	7	0	0	0	—						7	0
Racing Santander	2006–07	La Liga	31	9	1	0	—						32	9
Racing Santander	2007–08	La Liga	22	3	7	2	—						29	5
Racing Santander (loan)	2008–09	La Liga	24	2	2	0	—		4 (Note: Appearances in UEFA Cup)	0	—		30	2
Racing Santander (loan)	Total		84	14	10	2	—		4	0	—		98	16
Real Madrid	2009–10	La Liga	20	1	0	0	—		3 (Note: Appearances in UEFA Champions League)	0	—		23	1
Real Madrid	2010–11	La Liga	5	0	2	0	—		1	0	—		8	0
Real Madrid	Total		25	1	2	0	—		4	0	—		31	1
Benfica	2011–12	Primeira Liga	24	2	2	0	3	0	11	0	—		40	2
Benfica	2012–13	Primeira Liga	27	1	4	0	1	0	14 (Note: Six appearances in UEFA Champions League, eight appearances in UEFA Europa League)	1	—		46	2
Benfica	2013–14	Primeira Liga	27	6	5	0	3	0	14	2	—		49	8
Benfica	Total		78	9	11	0	7	0	39	3	—		135	12
Zenit Saint Petersburg	2014–15	Russian Premier League	26	1	1	0	—		15 (Note: Ten appearances in UEFA Champions League, five appearances in UEFA Europa League)	0	—		42	1
Zenit Saint Petersburg	2015–16	Russian Premier League	20	2	2	0	—		6	0	0	0	28	2
Zenit Saint Petersburg	2016–17	Russian Premier League	4	0	0	0	—				1 (Note: Appearance in Russian Super Cup)	0	5	0
Zenit Saint Petersburg	Total		50	3	3	0	—		21	0	1	0	75	3
Valencia	2016–17	La Liga	27	4	1	0	—						28	4
Valencia	2017–18	La Liga	24	0	4	0	—						28	0
Valencia	2018–19	La Liga	24	2	3	0	—		8 (Note: Three appearances in UEFA Champions League, five appearances in UEFA Europa League)	0	—		35	2
Valencia	2019–20	La Liga	17	0	0	0	—		5	0	1 (Note: Appearance in Supercopa de España)	0	23	0
Valencia	Total		92	6	8	0	—		13	0	1	0	114	6
Career total			342	34	34	2	7	0	81	3	2	0	466	39

=== International ===
Appearances and goals by national team and year
National team	Year	Apps	Goals
Argentina	2007	1	0
Argentina	2011	2	0
Argentina	2012	8	0
Argentina	2013	7	0
Argentina	2014	7	0
Argentina	2015	7	0
Total		32	0

== Honours ==
Newell's Old Boys

- Argentine Primera División: 2004 Apertura

Real Madrid

- Copa del Rey: 2010–11

Benfica

- Primeira Liga: 2013–14
- Taça de Portugal: 2013–14
- Taça da Liga: 2011–12, 2013–14
- UEFA Europa League runner-up: 2012–13, 2013–14

Zenit Saint Petersburg

- Russian Premier League: 2014–15
- Russian Cup: 2015–16
- Russian Super Cup: 2016

Valencia

- Copa del Rey: 2018–19

Argentina U17

- FIFA U-17 World Cup third place: 2003

Argentina U20

- FIFA U-20 World Cup: 2005

Argentina U23

- Summer Olympic Games: 2008

Argentina

- FIFA World Cup runner-up: 2014
- Copa América runner-up: 2015

Individual

- UEFA Europa League Squad of the Season: 2013–14
