= Nemanja Matić =

Serbian footballer (born 1988)

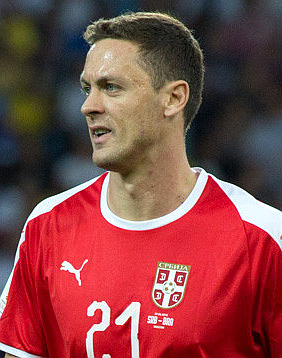
- Matić playing for Serbia at the 2018 FIFA World Cup

Personal information
- Full name: Nemanja Matić
- Date of birth: 1 August 1988 (age 38)
- Place of birth: Šabac, SR Serbia, SFR Yugoslavia
- Height: 1.94 m (6 ft 4 in)
- Position: Defensive midfielder

Team information
- Current team: Sassuollo
- Number: 18

Youth career
- 1993–1997: Vrelo
- 1997–2000: Obrenovac 1905
- 2000–2004: Red Star Belgrade
- 2004–2005: Partizan
- 2005–2006: Jedinstvo Ub

Senior career*
Years	Team	Apps	(Gls)
2006–2007	Kolubara	16	(2)
2007–2009	Košice	70	(4)
2009–2011	Chelsea	2	(0)
2010–2011	→ Vitesse (loan)	28	(2)
2011–2014	Benfica	56	(6)
2014–2017	Chelsea	121	(4)
2017–2022	Manchester United	128	(2)
2022–2023	Roma	35	(2)
2023–2024	Rennes	14	(0)
2024–2025	Lyon	44	(0)
2025–	Sassuolo	42	(1)

International career
2008–2010	Serbia U21	12	(2)
2008–2019	Serbia	48	(2)
- * Club domestic league appearances and goals as of 24 October 2026 (UTC)

Nemanja Matić (Serbian Cyrillic: Немања Матић, pronounced [němaɲa mǎːtitɕ]; born 1 August 1988) is a Serbian professional footballer who plays as a defensive midfielder for Serie A club Sassuolo.

Matić began his senior career at Kolubara, before joining Slovak side Košice in 2007. He moved to English club Chelsea for £1.5 million in 2009. Used sparingly during his first spell at the club, he spent the 2010–11 season on loan at Dutch club Vitesse, and in the summer of 2011, he moved to Benfica as part of a swap deal involving David Luiz. He won the Primeira Liga Player of the Year award for his performances in the 2012–13 season.

Matić returned to Chelsea in January 2014, for £21 million. He was an integral part of a Chelsea team that won two Premier League titles. He was named in the PFA Team of the Year for the 2014–15 season. In July 2017, he was reunited with former Chelsea manager José Mourinho after signing for Manchester United. He played with Manchester United until 2022 when he again was reunited with Mourinho at Roma. After one season with Roma, he joined Rennes in 2023.

Matić represented Serbia at under-21 level. He made his senior international debut in 2008 and scored two goals in 48 appearances. He was part of Serbia's squad at the 2018 FIFA World Cup.

== Club career ==
=== Early career ===
Matić was born in Šabac, SR Serbia. He began playing football at age five with FK Vrelo from the eponymous village, coached by his own father. He began his senior career at Kolubara before signing for Slovak club Košice in 2007. While living in the country, he also received Slovak citizenship.

=== Chelsea ===
On 18 August 2009, Matić signed for Chelsea from Košice for a fee of around £1.5 million on a four-year contract, having been on trial at Middlesbrough. He was given the number 24 shirt by Chelsea but could not debut immediately due to the injury he picked up at the 2009 UEFA European Under-21 Football Championship. He was on the bench for Chelsea's League Cup match against Queens Park Rangers on 23 September 2009, but did not take any part in the 1–0 victory. Matić made his Premier League debut for Chelsea on 21 November, coming on as a substitute for Florent Malouda in the 69th minute in a 4–0 victory against Wolverhampton Wanderers.

On 23 August 2010, Matić transferred to Eredivisie club Vitesse on a one-year loan, together with teammates Slobodan Rajković and Matej Delač.

=== Benfica ===
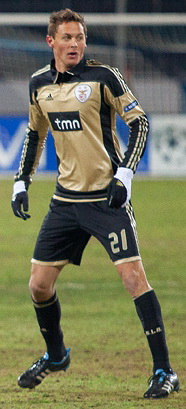
Matić playing for Benfica in 2012

On 31 January 2011, Matić agreed to join Portuguese club Benfica next summer as part of a transfer for Chelsea to sign Brazilian centre-back David Luiz. Under Benfica manager Jorge Jesus, Matić was converted from a playmaker into a defensive midfielder. On 14 April 2012, Matić started for Benfica in the 2012 Taça da Liga Final against Gil Vicente, where he won his first trophy with the Lisbon-based club.

On 13 January 2013, Matić scored Benfica's first goal in a 2–2 draw against O Clássico rivals Porto. The next day, he was awarded with a contract extension until 2018, with the buyout clause set at €45 million.

In the second leg of Benfica's Europa League round of 32 tie against Bayer Leverkusen, Matić headed in a late goal after a cross from Lima to seal a 3–1 aggregate victory. He was a key member throughout the 2012–13 Primeira Liga as Benfica looked to claim their club's first league championship since 2010. Going into the penultimate game of the season against Porto, both teams were undefeated in league play, but a stoppage-time winner from substitute Kelvin gave Porto a 2–1 victory.

On 15 May, Matić faced former employers Chelsea in the Europa League final in Amsterdam but was on the losing club as Benfica fell to a 2–1 defeat, courtesy of a last minute Branislav Ivanović header. On 4 July 2013, he was named Primeira Liga Player of the Year after having won the monthly award three times over the course of the season.

In the 2013–14 season, Matić played half of the season, with 22 matches and three goals, he helped Benfica to win the Primeira Liga and Taça de Portugal. On 13 January 2014, Matić placed second in the 2013 FIFA Puskás Award.

=== Return to Chelsea ===
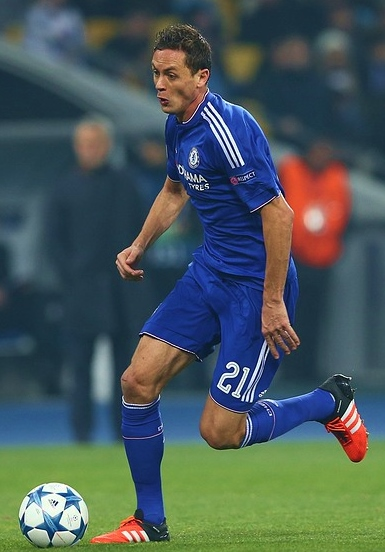
Matić playing for Chelsea in 2015

On 15 January 2014, Matić rejoined Chelsea for a fee of £21 million (€25M), on a five-and-a-half-year contract. He made his second debut for the club four days later, replacing Willian in a 3–1 victory against Manchester United.

On 3 February, Matić made his first Premier League start in Chelsea's fixture away at championship rivals Manchester City. He was named man of the match by Sky Sports as Chelsea ended City's unbeaten run at the City of Manchester Stadium with a 1–0 victory.

On 30 August 2014, Matić scored his first Premier League goal in a 6–3 victory against Everton. One month later, he scored the only goal as Chelsea won away at Sporting CP in the group stage of the Champions League. In the same competition on 5 November, his goal earned Chelsea a 1–1 draw against Maribor.

In Chelsea's 1–1 home draw against Burnley on 21 February 2015, Matić was given a straight red card for pushing over Ashley Barnes following a high tackle by him, which resulted in the bending of Matić's shin. On appeal, his suspension was shortened to two matches, including the League Cup Final. On 26 April, Matić was named as one of four midfielders in the PFA Team of the Year, alongside teammate Eden Hazard. Four more Chelsea players were included in the selection.

On 12 September 2015, Matić scored his first goal of the 2015–16 Premier League season against Everton, but it was not enough to save Chelsea from a 3–1 loss. he was sent off for two yellow cards in the first half of Chelsea's 2–1 loss against West Ham United on 24 October.

For the majority of the 2016–17 Premier League season, Matić played as a central midfielder in a 3–4–3 formation. He scored the 4th goal in Chelsea's 4–2 FA Cup semi-final victory against Tottenham Hotspur on 22 April 2017. On 8 May 2017, Matić scored his first ever goal at Stamford Bridge, in a 3–0 victory against Middlesbrough.

=== Manchester United ===
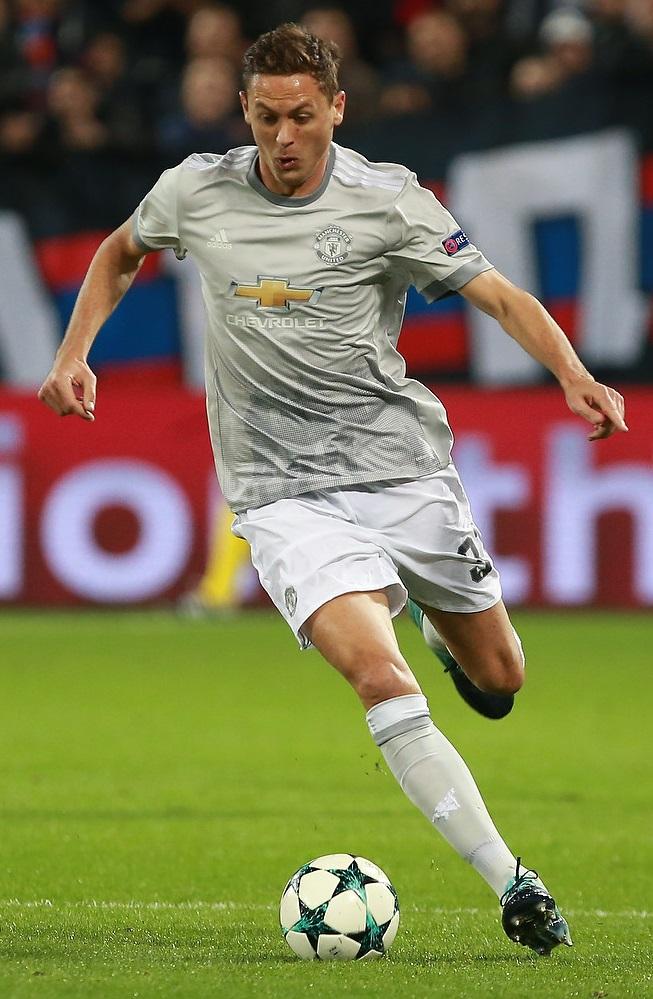
Matić playing for Manchester United in 2017

On 30 July 2017, a photo was leaked of Matić wearing a Manchester United training kit printed with the number 31 vacated by Bastian Schweinsteiger the previous March, fuelling rumours that Matić was on the verge of a reunion with former Chelsea manager José Mourinho. Manchester United confirmed the deal the next day, with Matić signing a three-year contract with an option for another year, for a fee reported to be in the region of £40 million.

Two days after signing, Matić made his first appearance in a friendly against Sampdoria, finishing in a 2–1 win over the Italian side. On 13 August 2017, he made his league debut in a 4–0 victory against West Ham United at Old Trafford, in which he was named Man of the Match. On 5 March 2018, Matić scored his first goal for the club with a half-volley in a 3–2 comeback victory against Crystal Palace after being 2–0 down. The goal was later voted Manchester United goal of the season. During the boxing day matches of the 2018–19 Premier League, Matić scored his first goal of the season and his second for Manchester United in a 3–1 victory against Huddersfield Town.

On 29 January 2020, Matić scored the only goal in a 1–0 derby win, but was also sent-off during the game which United lost 3–2 on aggregate. On 17 March, Manchester United triggered a clause in Matić's contract to extend it by another year rather than allowing it to expire in summer, keeping him at the club for a fourth season. On 6 July 2020, Matić signed a new three-year contract with the club, securing his future until 2023.

On 15 April 2022, Matić announced he would leave the club at the end of the season.

=== Roma ===
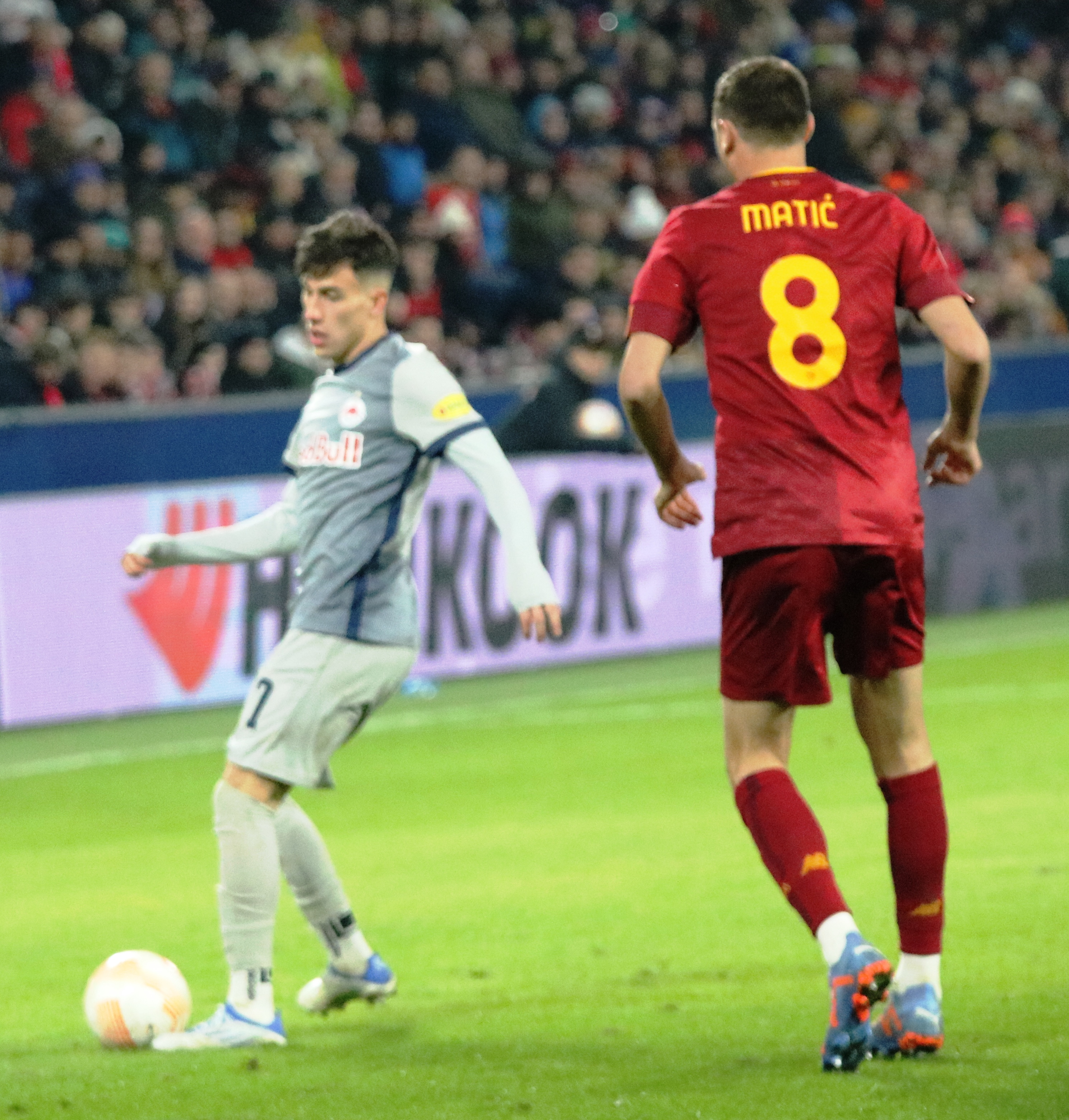
Matić defending against FC Red Bull Salzburg's Nicolás Capaldo in February 2023

On 14 June 2022, it was announced that Matić had agreed to join Roma on a one-year contract, following the expiry of his Manchester United contract. He joined on a free transfer. This was his third reunion with manager José Mourinho, having also played under him for Chelsea and Manchester United. "I already worked with him, we have a good connection and he is one of the reasons why I came here." Matić on Mourinho. On 14 August, he made his debut for the club, as a substitute, in a 1–0 away win against Salernitana in the Serie A. He started in the Europa League final, but was replaced in the extra-time as Roma went on to lose the match on penalties.

In 2025, years after his departure from AS Roma, Matić revealed in an interview that he decided to leave the club as they did not respect him.

=== Later career ===
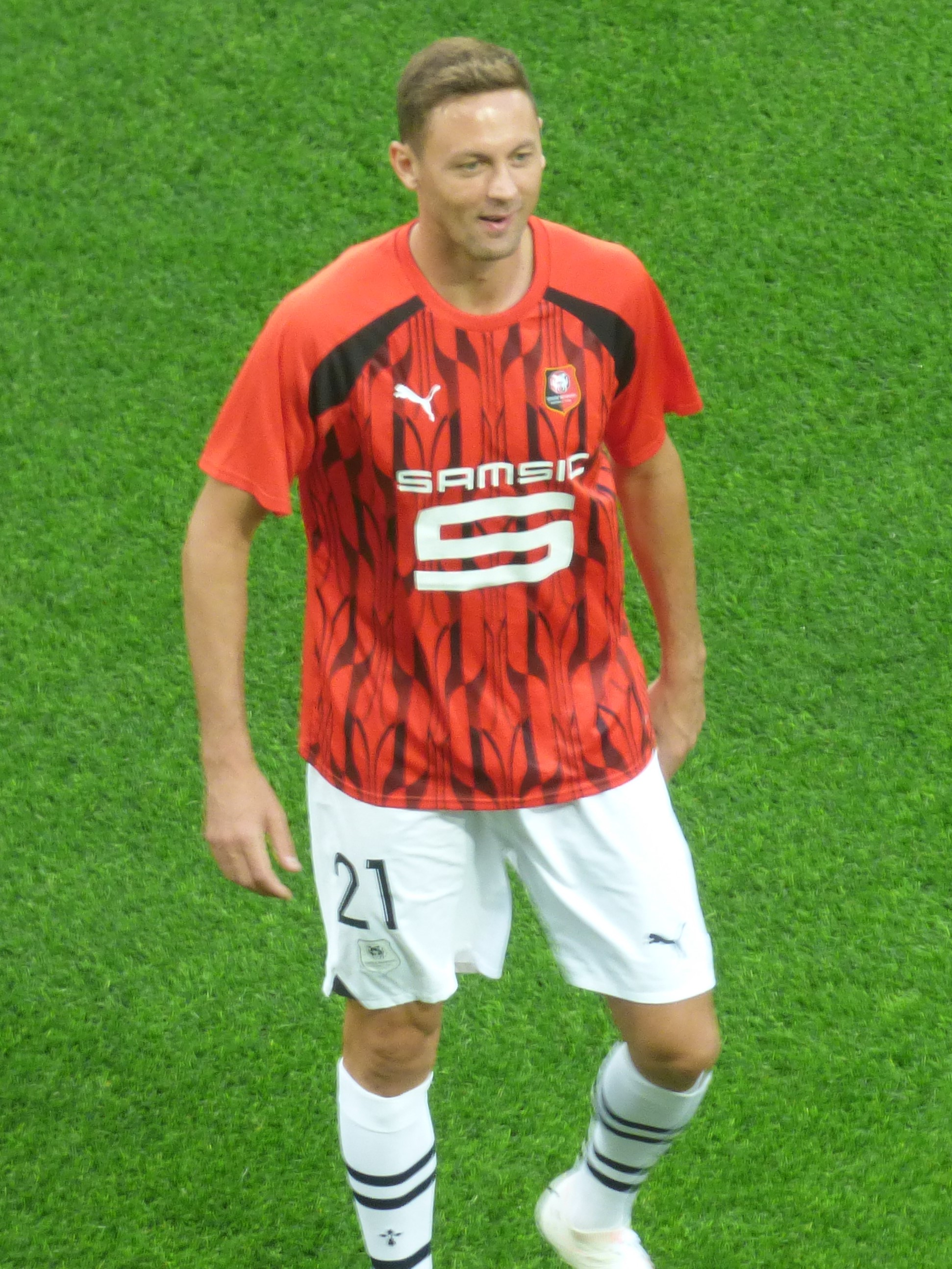
Matić with Rennes in 2023

On 14 August 2023, Matić joined Ligue 1 club Rennes on a two-year contract for a reported transfer fee of €3 million. He played in 13 Ligue 1 matches and received seven yellow cards, incurring two yellow card suspensions. Rennes won two matches that Matić played in. He was left out of the squad after 18 December, with Rennes winning all five matches until his departure. However, Matić played in all six Europa League group stage matches, providing an assist in all three home ones as Rennes advanced from their group.

On 27 January 2024, Matić joined fellow Ligue 1 club Lyon on a two-and-a-half-year contract, for a transfer fee of €2.6 million. On 17 May 2025, Matić played in a Ligue 1 match against Angers SCO with a white tape on the sleeve of his jersey covering Ligue 1's anti-homophobia badge. He was given a two-game ban for his action. On 14 August 2025, his contract with Lyon was terminated by mutual consent.

On 26 August 2025, Matić signed for newly-promoted Serie A club Sassuolo until 2026.

== International career ==
=== Youth and senior debut ===
In August 2008, while playing for MFK Košice in Slovak Corgoň Liga, Matić received Slovak citizenship. Initially, he expressed an interest in playing for Slovakia at international level, refusing to play for his country of birth: "They can lure me into the A-team or the U21 [team], but I don't want to [play for Serbia] any more. I've already decided."

However, on 11 October 2008, he debuted for the Serbia under-21 team in a match against Denmark. After three matches and two goals for the Serbia under-21 squad, he was called up to the senior team, debuting in a friendly match against Poland on 14 December 2008, in a 1–0 loss. Matić played in the Cyprus International Football Tournament in 2009 where Serbia made it to the final.

Matić took part in the 2009 UEFA Euro Under-21 Championship, where he played 85 minutes in the first group match against Italy in a 0–0 draw. Matić, however, injured himself after contact with Italian forward Sebastian Giovinco. He broke the fifth metatarsal in his right foot and was forced to undergo surgery.

=== Refusal to play and first senior goal ===
In December 2012, Matić announced he would not play for the Serbia national team while Siniša Mihajlović was the coach. The reason was that Matić felt he was not given the right opportunity by the coach not playing a single minute in his last five call-ups. On 6 September 2013, Matić returned to the senior team on a 2014 FIFA World Cup qualification match against Croatia, being sent off in the 75th minute.

On 29 March 2015, Matić scored his first international goal in a UEFA Euro 2016 qualifying away match against Portugal at the Estádio da Luz – equalising via an overhead kick – albeit in a 2–1 defeat. On 11 October, in a loss against the same opponents by the same score at the Partizan Stadium, Matić received a straight red card within a minute of teammate Aleksandar Kolarov's dismissal.

=== 2018 World Cup and retirement ===
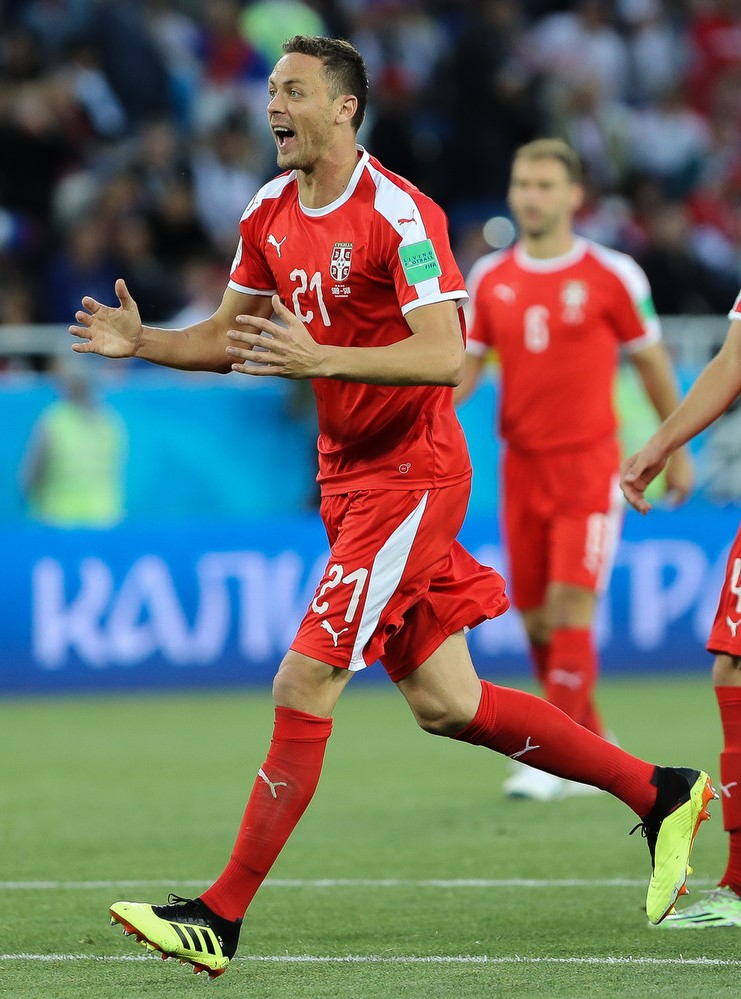
Matić playing for Serbia at the 2018 FIFA World Cup

In June 2018, Matić was selected to represent the Serbian team at the 2018 World Cup, playing all three group stage matches.

On 28 August 2020, the Football Association of Serbia announced that Matić had retired from international football. He made 48 appearances and scored two goals for Serbia. He earned his final cap against Luxembourg on 10 September 2019.

== Style of play ==
A left-footed defensive midfielder, Matić's poise and power, in addition to his in-game intelligence and tactical awareness, have enabled his attacking teammates to flourish. He is often used at a holding position and screens the defence while providing cover for attacking movements. Just before he joined Manchester United, he had a tackle success rate of 75% in 123 Premier League appearances, a higher rate than N'Golo Kante, Ander Herrera, Fernandinho and Jordan Henderson. José Mourinho commented on Matić, "At this moment, he is a giant, not for his size but for the way he plays." Matić's qualities have led to comparison to his ex-teammate at Manchester United, Michael Carrick. Prior to joining Benfica, he played as an attacking midfielder, before being shifted to a holding midfield role.

== Personal life ==
Matić was born in Šabac, Serbia. His maternal grandfather is from Volkovija, North Macedonia. His younger brother, Uroš, is a former professional footballer, currently coaching Jedinstvo Ub in Serbia. He has three children with his wife, Aleksandra.

Matić has admired former Manchester United midfielder Roy Keane from an early age.

In November 2018, Matić refused to wear a remembrance poppy on his shirt for a match against Bournemouth. After the match, he was castigated and got threats by a number of people via social networks for not respecting servicemen who have died in war. He stated that he will not wear a poppy because his village of Vrelo was hit by the NATO bombing of Yugoslavia in 1999. On 17 May 2025, the International Day Against Homophobia, Biphobia and Transphobia, Matić played in Lyon's match against Angers with an anti-homophobia logo on his shirt appearing to be covered.

== Career statistics ==
=== Club ===
As of match played 24 October 2026

Appearances and goals by club, season and competition
Club	Season	League			National cup (Note: Includes FA Cup, KNVB Cup, Taça de Portugal, Coppa Italia, Coupe de France)		League cup (Note: Includes Taça da Liga, Football League/EFL Cup)		Europe		Other		Total	
Club	Season	Division	Apps	Goals	Apps	Goals	Apps	Goals	Apps	Goals	Apps	Goals	Apps	Goals
Košice	2006–07	Slovak Superliga	14	1	0	0	—		—		—		14	1
Košice	2007–08	Slovak Superliga	26	1	0	0	—		—		—		26	1
Košice	2008–09	Slovak Superliga	29	2	0	0	—		—		—		29	2
Košice	2009–10	Slovak Superliga	1	0	—		—		0	0	—		1	0
Košice	Total		70	4	0	0	—		0	0	—		70	4
Chelsea	2009–10	Premier League	2	0	1	0	0	0	0	0	—		3	0
Chelsea	2010–11	Premier League	0	0	—		—		—		0	0	0	0
Chelsea	Total		2	0	1	0	0	0	0	0	0	0	3	0
Vitesse (loan)	2010–11	Eredivisie	27	2	2	0	—		—		—		29	2
Benfica	2011–12	Primeira Liga	16	1	2	0	2	0	10 (Note: Appearances in UEFA Champions League)	0	—		30	1
Benfica	2012–13	Primeira Liga	26	3	7	1	1	0	13 (Note: Five appearances in UEFA Champions League, eight appearances and one goal in UEFA Europa League)	1	—		47	5
Benfica	2013–14	Primeira Liga	14	2	2	0	0	0	6	1	—		22	3
Benfica	Total		56	6	11	1	3	0	29	2	—		99	9
Chelsea	2013–14	Premier League	17	0	2	0	—		—		—		19	0
Chelsea	2014–15	Premier League	36	1	0	0	5	0	8	2	—		49	3
Chelsea	2015–16	Premier League	33	2	3	0	1	0	5	0	1 (Note: Appearance in FA Community Shield)	0	43	2
Chelsea	2016–17	Premier League	35	1	3	1	2	0	—		—		40	2
Chelsea	Total		121	4	8	1	8	0	13	2	1	0	151	7
Manchester United	2017–18	Premier League	36	1	4	1	1	0	7	0	1 (Note: Appearance in UEFA Super Cup)	0	49	2
Manchester United	2018–19	Premier League	28	1	3	0	1	0	6	0	—		38	1
Manchester United	2019–20	Premier League	21	0	5	0	3	1	5 (Note: Appearances in UEFA Europa League)	0	—		34	1
Manchester United	2020–21	Premier League	20	0	3	0	2	0	11 (Note: Four appearances in UEFA Champions League, seven appearances in UEFA Europa League)	0	—		36	0
Manchester United	2021–22	Premier League	23	0	0	0	1	0	8	0	—		32	0
Manchester United	Total		128	2	15	1	8	1	37	0	1	0	189	4
Roma	2022–23	Serie A	35	2	2	0	—		13	0	—		50	2
Rennes	2023–24	Ligue 1	13	0	0	0	—		6	0	—		19	0
Lyon	2023–24	Ligue 1	15	0	4	0	—		—		—		19	0
Lyon	2024–25	Ligue 1	29	0	2	1	—		5	0	—		36	1
Lyon	Total		44	0	6	1	—		5	0	—		55	1
Sassuolo	2025–26	Serie A	34	1	0	0	—		—		—		34	1
Sassuolo	2026–27	Serie A	8	0	1	0	—		—		—		9	0
Sassuolo	Total		42	1	1	0	—		—		—		43	1
Career total			554	23	46	4	19	1	103	4	2	0	724	32

=== International ===
Appearances and goals by national team and year
National team	Year	Apps	Goals
Serbia	2008	1	0
Serbia	2009	1	0
Serbia	2010	0	0
Serbia	2011	0	0
Serbia	2012	3	0
Serbia	2013	4	0
Serbia	2014	9	0
Serbia	2015	8	1
Serbia	2016	4	0
Serbia	2017	6	1
Serbia	2018	10	0
Serbia	2019	2	0
Total		48	2

Serbia score listed first, score column indicates score after each Matić goal

List of international goals scored by Nemanja Matić
No.	Date	Venue	Cap	Opponent	Score	Result	Competition
1	29 March 2015	Estádio da Luz, Lisbon, Portugal	19	Portugal	1–1	1–2	UEFA Euro 2016 qualification
2	6 October 2017	Ernst-Happel-Stadion, Vienna, Austria	35	Austria	2–2	2–3	2018 FIFA World Cup qualification

== Honours ==
Košice

- Slovak Cup: 2008–09

Chelsea

- Premier League: 2014–15, 2016–17
- FA Cup: 2009–10; runner-up: 2016–17
- Football League Cup: 2014–15

Benfica

- Primeira Liga: 2013–14
- Taça de Portugal: 2013–14; runner-up: 2012–13
- Taça da Liga: 2011–12, 2013–14
- UEFA Europa League runner-up: 2012–13

Manchester United

- FA Cup runner-up: 2017–18
- UEFA Europa League runner-up: 2020–21

Roma

- UEFA Europa League runner-up: 2022–23

Lyon

- Coupe de France runner-up: 2023–24

Individual

- LPFP Primeira Liga Player of the Year: 2012–13
- Serbian Footballer of the Year: 2014, 2015
- SJPF Player of the Month: December 2012, January 2013, April 2013
- PFA Team of the Year: 2014–15 Premier League
- Manchester United Goal of the Season: 2017–18 (vs. Crystal Palace, 5 March 2018)
- UEFA Europa League Team of the Season: 2022–23
