= Vrelo (Ub) =

Vrelo Врело
- Village (Selo)
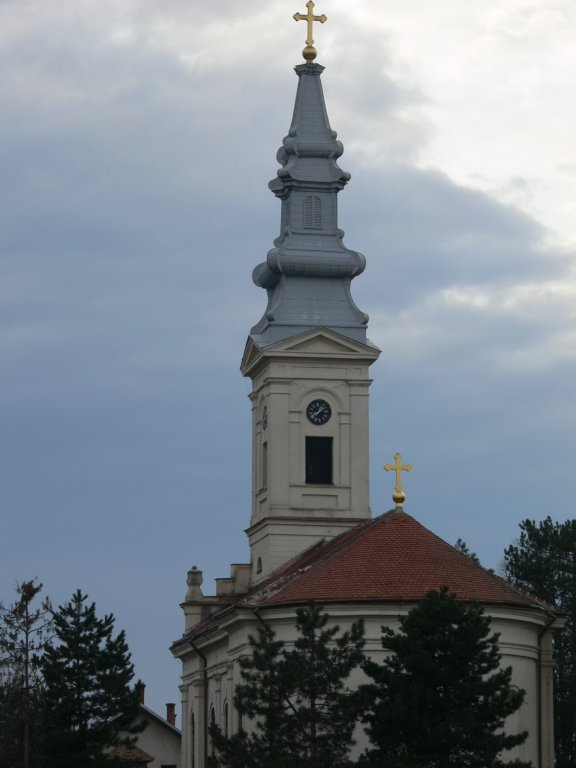
- Village's Church

- Location within Serbia
- Coordinates: 44°30′N 20°01′E
- Country: Serbia
- District: Kolubara District
- Municipality: Ub

Area
  - Total: 24.36 km^{2} (9.41 sq mi)
- Elevation: 101 m (331 ft)

Population (2011)
  - Total: 1,503
  - Density: 61.70/km^{2} (159.8/sq mi)
- Time zone: UTC+1 (CET)
  - Summer (DST): UTC+2 (CEST)

Vrelo (Serbian Cyrillic: Врело) is a village located in the municipality of Ub, western Serbia. According to the 2011 census, the village has a population of 1,503 inhabitants.

== Trivia ==
Football player Nemanja Matić is a native of this village.

== Gallery ==
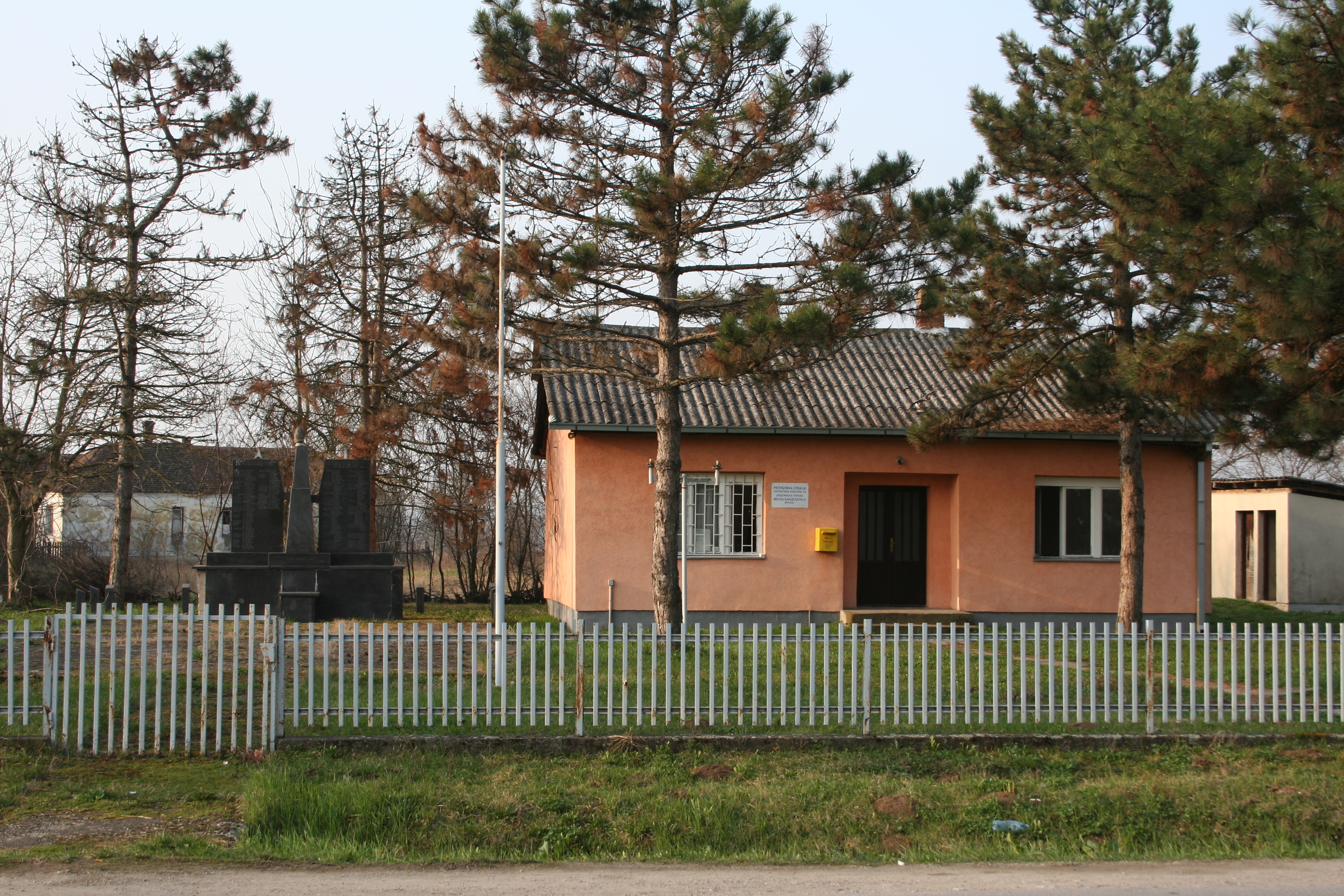
Village's local community building

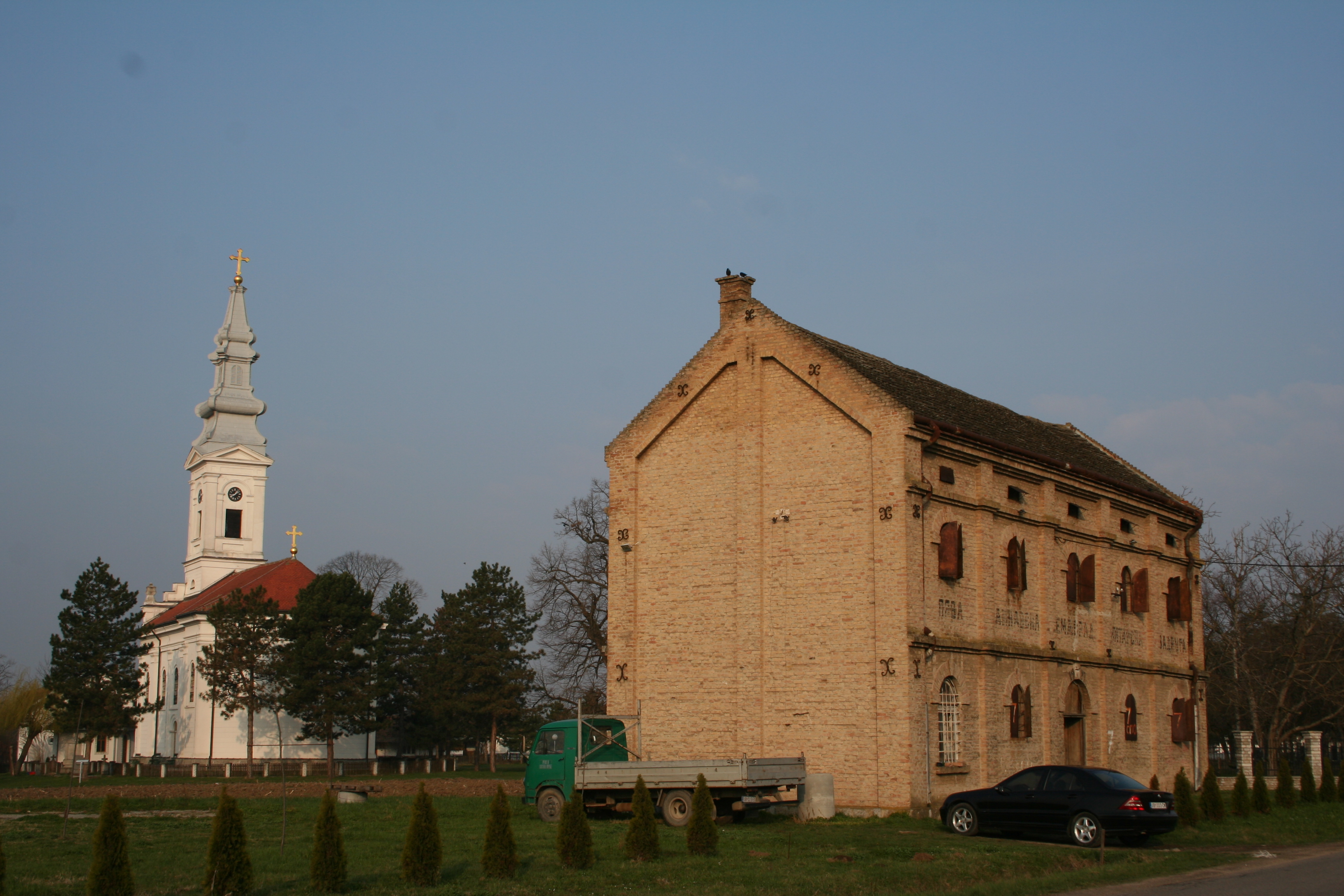
Cooperative's building and Church in the background
