= Luís Tinoco (footballer) =

Portuguese footballer (born 1986)

Personal information
- Full name: Luís Fernando Gonçalves Fernandes Tinoco
- Date of birth: 17 October 1986 (age 40)
- Place of birth: Barcelos, Portugal
- Height: 1.86 m (6 ft 1 in)
- Position: Left-back

Youth career
- 1997–2005: Gil Vicente

Senior career*
Years	Team	Apps	(Gls)
2005–2008	Gil Vicente	4	(0)
2006–2007	→ Valdevez (loan)		
2007–2008	→ Vianense (loan)		
2008–2009	Monopoli	16	(0)
2009–2010	Vianense	28	(1)
2010–2012	Beira-Mar	1	(0)
2011	→ Moreirense (loan)	7	(0)
2011–2012	→ Estoril (loan)	8	(0)
2012–2013	Naval	40	(2)
2013–2015	Arouca	40	(0)
2015–2016	Tondela	11	(0)
2016–2017	União Madeira	15	(0)
2017–2018	Gil Vicente	22	(1)
2018–2019	Oliveirense	20	(1)
2019–2020	Felgueiras 1932	13	(1)
2020–2023	Santa Maria	18	(0)
Total		243	(6)
- * Club domestic league appearances and goals

Luís Fernando Gonçalves Fernandes Tinoco (born 17 October 1986) is a Portuguese former professional footballer who played as a left-back.

== Club career ==
Born in Barcelos, Tinoco reached local Gil Vicente FC's youth system at the age of 10. He appeared in four Primeira Liga games towards the end of the 2004–05 season, but went on to spend the following years on loan to amateur clubs, being released from contract in 2008 and joining another lower-league side, Italy's SS Monopoli 1966.

Tinoco returned to his country's top division in the summer of 2010, but only featured once in the league with S.C. Beira-Mar, being loaned twice to teams in the Segunda Liga. For the 2012–13 campaign he signed with another club in the latter tier, Associação Naval 1º de Maio.

Following Naval's relegation to the third division due to irregularities, Tinoco moved to newly promoted F.C. Arouca in late June 2013. He was presented the following month alongside Rui Sacramento.

On 24 June 2015, having been relatively played during his stint, Tinoco signed a one-year deal with top-flight C.D. Tondela. When it expired, he agreed to a similar one at C.F. União in the league below.
