= 2015–16 Associação Académica de Coimbra – O.A.F. season =

Académica
2015–16 season
- President: José Eduardo Simões
- Coach: José Viterbo (until 20 September 2015); Filipe Gouveia (from 24 September 2015)
- Stadium: Estádio Cidade de Coimbra
- Primeira Liga: 18th
- Taça de Portugal: Fifth round
- Taça da Liga: Second Round
- Top goalscorer: League: Pedro Nuno (4); All: Rafael Lopes (6)
- Highest home attendance: 26,444
- Lowest home attendance: 2,170
- Average home league attendance: 5,354

The 2015–16 season was Académica de Coimbra's 64th season in the Primeira Liga and 14th and final consecutive season in the top flight of Portuguese football. Briosa also participated in the Taça de Portugal and Taça da Liga. The club was initially managed by José Viterbo in what would have been his first full season as manager. Viterbo, however, resigned on 20 September 2015 and later replaced by Filipe Gouveia on 24 September. The club were relegated from the top flight of Portuguese football for the first time since the 1998–99 season, following a home draw with Braga on 7 May 2016.

== Competitions ==
=== Pre-season ===
15 July 2015 Friendly	Académica	3–1	Académica U19	Quiaios, Figueira da Foz
17:30	Hwang (?); Lopes (?); Pedro Nuno (?)		António Xavier (?)	Stadium: Centro de Estágio Rosa Náutica

18 July 2015 Friendly	Académica	0–1	Feirense	Quiaios, Figueira da Foz
10:30			? (?)	Stadium: Centro de Estágio Rosa Náutica

22 July 2015 Friendly	Académica	0–1	Arouca	Coimbra
17:00			Vedova 84'	Stadium: Estádio Cidade de Coimbra

25 July 2015 Friendly	Tondela	1–2	Académica	Anadia
10:30	Saldanha 68'		Ivanildo 32', 66'	Stadium: Estádio Municipal de Anadia

29 July 2015 Friendly	Académica	0–3	Nacional	Coimbra
17:00			Soares 24', 44'; Peters 67'	Stadium: Estádio Cidade de Coimbra

31 July 2015 Friendly	Naval	0–1	Académica	Figueira da Foz
19:00			Rui Pedro 68'	Stadium: Estádio Municipal José Bento Pessoa

1 August 2015 Friendly	Académica	1–2	Benfica Castelo Branco	Entroncamento
17:00	Rabiola 57'		Rocha 38'; Cristiano Pascoal 88'	Stadium: Estádio Municipal do Entroncamento

4 August 2015 Troféu Crédito Agrícola	Académica	2–2 (4–2 p)	(Morocco) Wydad Casablanca	Coimbra
20:00	Rabiola 20' (pen.); Rui Pedro 43' (pen.)		El-Moutaraji 16'; Diarra 66' (pen.)	Stadium: Estádio Cidade de Coimbra

8 August 2015 Friendly	Académica	1–1	Rio Ave	Coimbra
17:00	Paciência 15'		Kizito 88'

9 August 2015 Friendly	Anadia	1–2	Académica	Anadia
16:00	Mendonça 89'		Pedro Nuno (?); Lopes (?)	Stadium: Municipal Engº Sílvio Henriques Cerveira

=== Primeira Liga ===
==== League table ====
Pos	Team	Pld	W	D	L	GF	GA	GD	Pts	Qualification or relegation
14	Boavista	34	8	9	17	24	41	−17	33	
15	Vitória de Setúbal	34	6	12	16	40	61	−21	30 (Note: Vitória de Setúbal ahead of Tondela on head-to-head record; Tondela–Vitória de Setúbal 1–3, Vitória de Setúbal–Tondela 0–1)	
16	Tondela	34	8	6	20	34	54	−20	30	
17	União da Madeira (R)	34	7	8	19	27	50	−23	29	Relegation to LigaPro
18	Académica (R)	34	5	10	19	32	60	−28	25	Relegation to LigaPro

Source: Liga Portugal, Soccerway
Rules for classification: 1) Points; 2) Head-to-head points; 3) Head-to-head goal difference; 4) Head-to-head away goals scored; 5) Goal difference; 6) Matches won; 7) Goals scored; 8) Play-off.
(Note: LPFP decided that only criteria 1, 5, 6 and 7 would be applied to establish the classification during the competition.)
(R) Relegated

==== Results by round ====
Round	1	2	3	4	5	6	7	8	9	10	11	12	13	14	15	16	17	18	19	20	21	22	23	24	25	26	27	28	29	30	31	32	33	34
Ground	A	H	H	A	H	A	H	A	H	A	H	A	H	A	H	A	H	H	A	A	H	A	H	A	H	A	H	A	H	A	H	A	H	A
Result	L	L	L	L	L	L	W	D	D	D	D	L	W	L	W	L	W	D	L	L	D	D	L	L	W	D	L	L	L	D	L	L	D	L
Position	15	18	18	18	18	18	18	17	17	17	17	17	17	17	16	16	16	17	17	17	17	17	17	17	17	17	17	17	17	17	17	17	18	18

Updated to match(es) played on 2 April 2016. Source: LPFP
A = Away; H = Home; W = Win; D = Draw; L = Loss

==== Matches ====
17 August 2015 1	Paços de Ferreira	1–0	Académica	Paços de Ferreira
20:00 WEST (UTC+01:00)	Christian (yellow card) 39'; Roniel (yellow card) 42' (goal) 43'; Pelé (yellow card) 60'; Baixinho (yellow card) 75'; Cícero (yellow card) 85'; Jota (red card) 90+2'	Report	Rui Pedro (yellow card) 21'; Bouadla (yellow card) 83'; Nascimento (red card) 90+2'; Obiora (yellow card) 90+4'	Stadium: Estádio da Mata Real; Attendance: 3,077; Referee: João Capela

24 August 2015 2	Académica	0–4	Vitória de Setúbal	Coimbra
20:00 WEST (UTC+01:00)		Report	Suk 17', 55'; Claro 57'; Costinha 81'	Stadium: Estádio EFAPEL Cidade de Coimbra; Attendance: 3,062; Referee: Cosme Machado

30 August 2015 3	Académica	1–3	Sporting CP	Coimbra
19:15 WEST (UTC+01:00)	Rabiola 33' (pen.)	Report	Mané 6'; Slimani 24'; Aquilani 83' (pen.)	Stadium: Estádio EFAPEL Cidade de Coimbra; Attendance: 12,903; Referee: Bruno Esteves

13 September 2015 4	Nacional	2–0	Académica	Funchal
16:00 WEST (UTC+01:00)	Soares 19'; Agra 64'	Report		Stadium: Estádio da Madeira; Attendance: 1,793; Referee: Luís Ferreira

20 September 2015 5	Académica	0–2	Boavista	Coimbra
16:00 WEST (UTC+01:00)		Report	Zé Manuel 1'; Carvalho 87'	Stadium: Estádio EFAPEL Cidade de Coimbra; Attendance: 3,507; Referee: João Pinheiro

28 September 2015 6	Rio Ave	1–0	Académica	Vila do Conde
20:00 WEST (UTC+01:00)	Bressan 36'	Report		Stadium: Estádio do Rio Ave; Attendance: 2,558; Referee: Nuno Almeida

3 October 2015 7	Académica	1–0	Marítimo	Coimbra
18:30 WEST (UTC+01:00)	Rui Pedro 63' (pen.)	Report		Stadium: Estádio EFAPEL Cidade de Coimbra; Attendance: 2,559; Referee: Bruno Paixão

24 October 2015 8	Vitória de Guimarães	1–1	Académica	Guimarães
20:45 WET (UTC+00:00)	Tomané 16'; Alex (yellow card) 23' (yellow-red card) 48'; Moreno (yellow card) 48' (red card) 59'; Dalbert (yellow card) 51'; Alves (yellow card) 90+4'	Report	Emídio Rafael (yellow card) 11'; Lopes (yellow card) 58', (goal) 66'; Rui Pedro (yellow card) 62'; Paciência (yellow card) 90+2'	Stadium: Estádio D. Afonso Henriques; Attendance: 10,036; Referee: Manuel Oliveira

1 November 2015 9	Académica	1–1	Moreirense	Coimbra
16:00 WET (UTC+00:00)	Obiora 16'; Seco (yellow card) 45'; Lopes (yellow card) 74'; Marinho (yellow card) 82'; Plange (yellow card) 90+1'	Report	Evaldo (yellow card) 18'; Gomes (yellow card) 27'; André Micael (yellow card) 30'; Medeiros (yellow card) 40'; Stefanović (yellow card) 85'; Fati 90+5'	Stadium: Estádio EFAPEL Cidade de Coimbra; Attendance: 2,855; Referee: Hugo Miguel

6 November 2015 10	Estoril	1–1	Académica	Estoril
20:30 WET (UTC+00:00)	Babanco (yellow card) 23'; Bonatini 34'; Diego Carlos (yellow card) 56'	Summary	Seco (yellow card) 43'; Rabiola 71'; Obiora (yellow card) 83'; Alexandre (yellow card) 86'; Paciência (yellow card) 90+4'	Stadium: Estádio António Coimbra da Mota; Attendance: 1,283; Referee: (Portugal) Jorge Sousa

29 November 2015 11	Académica	1–1	Arouca	Coimbra
16:00 WET (UTC+00:00)	Paciência 11'; Piloto (yellow card) 69'; Santos (yellow card) 78'; L. Silva (yellow card) 78'; Ivanildo (yellow card) 80'; Marinho (red card) 90+2'	Summary	Maurides 37'; Simão (yellow card) 45+2'	Stadium: Estádio EFAPEL Cidade de Coimbra; Attendance: 2,752; Referee: (Portugal) João Capela

4 December 2015 12	Benfica	3–0	Académica	Lisbon
20:30 WET (UTC+00:00)	Fejsa (yellow card) 18'; Jonas 35' (pen.), 69' (pen.); Sanches 85'	Summary	Trigueira (yellow card) 34'; A. Silva (yellow card) 44'; Ofori (yellow card) 69'; Rabiola (yellow card) 80'	Stadium: Estádio da Luz; Attendance: 34,752; Referee: (Portugal) Luís Ferreira

14 December 2015 13	Académica	4–3	Belenenses	Coimbra
21:00 WET (UTC+00:00)	Paciência 21' (pen.); Alexandre (yellow card) 34', (goal) 80'; Pedro Nuno 42', (yellow card) 44'; Ivanildo 46'; Santos (yellow card) 85'	Summary	João Afonso (yellow card) 21'; Sturgeon (yellow card) 37'; Nascimento 45+1' (o.g.); Dias (yellow card) 48'; Caeiro 58'; G. Silva (yellow card) 73'; Ferreira (yellow card) 76'; T. Silva (yellow card) 90+1'; Pinto 90+3'	Stadium: Estádio EFAPEL Cidade de Coimbra; Attendance: 2,659; Referee: (Portugal) Carlos Miguel Taborda Xistra

20 December 2015 14	Porto	3–1	Académica	Porto
21:30 WET (UTC+00:00)	D. Pereira 7', (yellow card) 89'; Aboubakar 53'; Herrera 72'	Summary	Lopes (yellow card) 34'; Alexandre (yellow card) 53'; Rui Pedro 84'	Stadium: Estádio do Dragão; Attendance: 32,122; Referee: (Portugal) Bruno Esteves

2 January 2016 15	Académica	3–1	União da Madeira	Coimbra
17:00 WET (UTC+00:00)	Nascimento 8'; Trigueira (yellow card) 20'; Ivanildo (yellow card) 22'; Alexandre 67', (yellow card) 87'; Real 85'; Rabiola (yellow card) 90'	Summary	Monteiro 21' (pen.); Gian (yellow card) 44'; Martins (yellow card) 63'; Amilton (yellow card) 81'; Paulinho (yellow card) 84'; Soares (yellow card) 86'; Joãozinho (yellow card) 88'	Stadium: Estádio EFAPEL Cidade de Coimbra; Attendance: 2,387; Referee: (Portugal) Fábio Veríssimo

6 January 2016 16	Braga	3–0	Académica	Braga
19:15 WET (UTC+00:00)	Kouka 31', 85'; Santos (yellow card) 42'; Stojiljković 45'	Summary	Piloto (yellow card) 20' (yellow-red card) 26'	Stadium: Estádio Municipal de Braga; Attendance: 4,169; Referee: (Portugal) Nuno Almeida

10 January 2016 17	Académica	2–1	Tondela	Coimbra
16:00 WET (UTC+00:00)	William Gustavo (yellow card) 52'; L. Silva (yellow card) 57'; Lopes 67'; Alexandre (yellow card) 76'; Seco 84'	Summary	Murillo 10'; Ramos (yellow card) 39'; Luís Alberto (yellow card) 45'; Souza (yellow card) 79'; Wágner (yellow card) 84'; Nascimento (yellow card) 87'	Stadium: Estádio EFAPEL Cidade de Coimbra; Attendance: 2,170; Referee: (Portugal) André Moreira

16 January 2016 18	Académica	1–1	Paços de Ferreira	Coimbra
16:15 WET (UTC+00:00)	Marinho (yellow card) 26'; Real 45+1'; Qualembo (yellow card) 64'; L. Silva (yellow card) 83'	Summary	Rocha (yellow card) 16' (yellow-red card) 84'; Jota 17'; Andrezinho (yellow card) 24'; Góis (yellow card) 56'	Stadium: Estádio EFAPEL Cidade de Coimbra; Attendance: 3,372; Referee: (Portugal) Sérgio Sousa

22 January 2016 19	Vitória de Setúbal	2–1	Académica	Setúbal
20:30 WET (UTC+00:00)	Hassan 38'; Venâncio (yellow card) 40'; Horta (yellow card) 81'; Issoko 84'; Ricardo (yellow card) 90+4'	Summary	Ivanildo (yellow card) 31'; Rafa (yellow card) 31'; Lopes (yellow card) 36'; Piloto 59'	Stadium: Estádio do Bonfim; Attendance: 2,288; Referee: (Portugal) Manuel Oliveira

30 January 2016 20	Sporting CP	3–2	Académica	Lisbon
20:45 WET (UTC+00:00)	Adrien Silva 30', (yellow card) 41'; Ruiz 43'; Ewerton (yellow card) 50'; Zeegelaar (yellow card) 82'; Montero 84'	Summary	Rafa 8', (yellow card) 22'; Aderlan Silva (yellow card) 19' (yellow-red card) 80'; L. Silva (yellow card) 40'; Alexandre (yellow card) 47'; Ewerton 58' (o.g.); Seco (yellow card) 80'	Stadium: Estádio José Alvalade; Attendance: 40,319; Referee: (Portugal) Cosme Cunha Machado

7 February 2016 21	Académica	2–2	Nacional	Coimbra
16:00 WET (UTC+00:00)	Plange 45'; Ivanildo (yellow card) 66'; Real 90'	Summary	Oualembo 46' (o.g.); Nascimento 50' (o.g.); Gottardi (yellow card) 85'; Fofana (yellow card) 90+1'	Stadium: Estádio EFAPEL Cidade de Coimbra; Attendance: 2,879; Referee: (Portugal) Luis Ferreira

14 February 2016 22	Boavista	0–0	Académica	Porto
17:00 WET (UTC+00:00)	Figueiredo (yellow card) 27'; Sampaio (yellow card) 85'; Mandiang (yellow card) 90+4'	Summary	Nascimento (yellow card) 24'; Real (yellow card) 60'	Stadium: Estádio do Bessa; Referee: (Portugal) Luis Godinho

20 February 2016 23	Académica	0–2	Rio Ave	Coimbra
20:45 WET (UTC+00:00)		Summary	Kuca 38'; Yazalde 69'; Edimar (yellow card) 85'; Roderick (yellow card) 90+3'	Stadium: Estádio EFAPEL Cidade de Coimbra; Attendance: 3,397; Referee: (Portugal) Manuel Mota

28 February 2016 24	Marítimo	1–0	Académica	Funchal
16:00 WET (UTC+00:00)	Soares (yellow card) 41'; Diawara 49'; Fransérgio (yellow card) 88'	Summary	L. Silva (yellow card) 15'; Santos (yellow card) 19'; Alexandre (yellow card) 55'	Stadium: Estádio dos Barreiros; Attendance: 6,756; Referee: (Portugal) Artur Soares Dias

6 March 2016 25	Académica	2–0	Vitória de Guimarães	Coimbra
18:15 WET (UTC+00:00)	Alexandre (yellow card) 45+2'; Marinho 50', 52'; L. Silva (yellow card) 63'	Summary	Pedrão (red card) 48'; Cafú (yellow card) 48'	Stadium: Estádio EFAPEL Cidade de Coimbra; Attendance: 4,889; Referee: (Portugal) Manuel Oliveira

13 March 2016 26	Moreirense	2–2	Académica	Moreira de Cónegos
16:00 WET (UTC+00:00)	Gonçalves (yellow card) 36'; Boateng 54'; Martins 85' (pen.), (red card) 90'	Summary	Plange 32'; Santos (yellow card) 34'; Seco (yellow card) 70'; L. Silva 78'; Real (yellow card) 84'	Stadium: Parque de Jogos Comendador Joaquim de Almeida Freitas; Attendance: 2,712; Referee: (Portugal) Fábio Veríssimo

20 March 2016 27	Académica	0–3	Estoril	Coimbra
16:00 WET (UTC+00:00)	Marinho (yellow card) 55'	Summary	Mattheus 21', 55'; Tavares (yellow card) 66'; Gerso 26', (yellow card) 69'	Stadium: Estádio EFAPEL Cidade de Coimbra; Attendance: 5,194; Referee: (Portugal) Rui Costa

2 April 2016 28	Arouca	3–2	Académica	Arouca
16:15 WEST (UTC+01:00)	Jubal 18'; Lima 39'; Artur 43'; Rodrigues (yellow card) 51'; Coelho (yellow card) 63'; Adilson (yellow card) 74'	Summary	Pedro Nuno 11'; Rabiola (yellow card) 46'; Piloto (yellow card) 49'; L. Silva (yellow card) 52'; Seco (yellow card) 66'; Paciência 62', (yellow card) 86'	Stadium: Estádio Municipal de Arouca; Referee: (Portugal) Carlos Xistra

9 April 2016 29	Académica	1–2	Benfica	Coimbra
18:30 WEST (UTC+01:00)	Pedro Nuno 17', (yellow card) 28'; Nascimento (yellow card) 21'; Santos (yellow card) 45'; Plange (yellow card) 90+1'	Summary	Mitroglou 39'; Jiménez 84'	Stadium: Estádio Cidade de Coimbra; Attendance: 26,444; Referee: João Capela (Lisbon)

17 April 2016 30	Belenenses	1–1	Académica	Lisbon
16:00 WEST (UTC+01:00)	Ortuño 32'	Summary	Lopes 37'	Stadium: Estádio do Restelo; Attendance: 3,928; Referee: Sérgio Piscarreta

23 April 2016 31	Académica	1–2	Porto	Coimbra
16:15 WEST (UTC+01:00)	Pedro Nuno 25'	Summary	Neves 38'; Brahimi 66'	Stadium: Estádio Cidade de Coimbra; Attendance: 5,085; Referee: Nuno Almeida

1 May 2016 32	União da Madeira	3–1	Académica	Ribeira Brava
20:30 WEST (UTC+01:00)	Martins 42', 62'; Gian 90+4'	Summary	Alexandre 68'	Stadium: Centro Desportivo da Madeira; Attendance: 2,423; Referee: Fábio Veríssimo

7 May 2016 33	Académica	0–0	Braga	Coimbra
18:30 WEST (UTC+01:00)		Summary		Stadium: Estádio EFAPEL Cidade de Coimbra; Attendance: 4,898; Referee: Manuel Mota

14 May 2016 34	Tondela	2–0	Académica	Tondela
19:30 WEST (UTC+01:00)	Pica 12'; Luís Alberto 54'	Summary		Stadium: Estádio João Cardoso; Attendance: 3,050; Referee: Rui Costa

=== Taça de Portugal ===
==== Third round ====
18 October 2015	Sanjoanense	1–5	Académica	São João da Madeira
15:00 WEST (UTC+01:00)	Bruno Almeida 49'		Lopes 7', 51'; Rui Pedro 36' (pen.); Paciência 85'; Marinho 90+3' (pen.)	Stadium: Estádio Conde Dias Garcia; Referee: André Moreira

==== Fourth round ====
21 November 2015	Trofense	0–0 (a.e.t.) (1–4 p)	Académica	Trofa
16:00 WET (UTC±00:00)	Serginho (yellow card) 35'; João Viana (yellow card) 63'; Miguel Ângelo (yellow card) 73'	Summary	Piloto (yellow card) 51'; Ofori (yellow card) 52' (yellow-red card) 68'; Nascimento (yellow card) 56'; A. Silva (yellow card) 76'; Obiora (yellow card) 85'; Paciência (yellow card) 105'	Stadium: Estádio CD Trofense; Referee: (Portugal) Jorge Ferreira

==== Fifth round ====
17 December 2015	Boavista	1–0	Académica	Porto
19:30 WET (UTC±00:00)	Mandiang (yellow card) 42'; Santos 86'	Summary	A. Silva (yellow card) 84'	Stadium: Estádio do Bessa; Referee: (Portugal) Rui Costa

=== Taça da Liga ===
==== Second round ====
23 September 2015	Marítimo	2–1	Académica	Funchal
16:00 WEST (UTC+01:00)	Costa 47'; João Diogo 57'	Report	Lopes 33' (pen.)	Stadium: Estádio dos Barreiros; Referee: Vasco Santos

== Players ==
=== Appearances and goals ===
No.	Pos	Nat	Player	Total		Primeira Liga		Taça de Portugal		Taça da Liga	
No.	Pos	Nat	Player	Apps	Goals	Apps	Goals	Apps	Goals	Apps	Goals
Goalkeepers
1	GK	(Portugal) POR	João Gomes	0	0	0	0	0	0	0	0
32	GK	(Brazil) BRA	Lee Oliveira	6	0	1+1	0	3	0	1	0
88	GK	(Portugal) POR	Pedro Trigueira	33	0	33	0	0	0	0	0
Defenders
2	DF	(Brazil) BRA	Aderlan Silva	27	0	23+2	0	2	0	0	0
3	DF	(Portugal) POR	Emídio Rafael	11	0	9	0	1	0	1	0
5	DF	(Brazil) BRA	Ricardo Nascimento	26	1	24+1	1	1	0	0	0
6	DF	(France) FRA	Tripy Makonda	1	0	0+1	0	0	0	0	0
13	DF	(Portugal) POR	João Real	30	3	24+2	3	3	0	0+1	0
14	DF	(Brazil) BRA	Iago Santos	19	0	17	0	1	0	1	0
22	DF	(Democratic Republic of the Congo) COD	Christopher Oualembo	15	0	12+1	0	1	0	1	0
23	DF	(Brazil) BRA	William Gustavo	8	0	3+3	0	1	0	1	0
37	DF	(Ghana) GHA	Richard Ofori	7	0	4+1	0	2	0	0	0
55	DF	(Portugal) POR	Rafa	15	0	15	0	0	0	0	0
Midfielders
4	MF	(Nigeria) NGA	Nwankwo Obiora	12	1	10+1	1	1	0	0	0
8	MF	(France) FRA	Selim Bouadla	8	0	5+2	0	0	0	1	0
20	MF	(Portugal) POR	Rui Pedro	24	3	16+5	2	3	1	0	0
21	MF	(Portugal) POR	Leandro Silva	30	1	23+4	1	2+1	0	0	0
24	MF	(South Korea) KOR	Hwang Mun-ki	2	0	0+1	0	0	0	1	0
27	MF	(Portugal) POR	Pedro Nuno	12	4	12	4	0	0	0	0
28	MF	(Portugal) POR	Nuno Piloto	21	1	13+5	1	3	0	0	0
48	MF	(Portugal) POR	Artur Taborda	1	0	0	0	0	0	1	0
65	MF	(Portugal) POR	Fernando Alexandre	29	3	27	3	0+1	0	1	0
Forwards
7	FW	(Portugal) POR	Marinho	21	3	10+8	2	2+1	1	0	0
9	FW	(Portugal) POR	Rabiola	25	2	9+14	2	1+1	0	0	0
10	FW	(Guinea-Bissau) GNB	Ivanildo	23	1	18+2	1	1+1	0	0+1	0
17	FW	(Ivory Coast) CIV	Inters Gui	6	0	1+5	0	0	0	0	0
19	FW	(Portugal) POR	Gonçalo Paciência	30	4	17+10	3	0+2	1	1	0
30	FW	(Portugal) POR	Rafael Lopes	29	6	13+13	3	2	2	1	1
43	FW	(Burkina Faso) BFA	Nii Plange	31	2	28	2	1+2	0	0	0
77	FW	(Portugal) POR	Hugo Seco	30	1	7+20	1	2	0	1	0

Last updated: 21 May 2016
Source: Equipa

=== Transfers ===
==== Summer ====
In: Note: Flags indicate national team as defined under FIFA eligibility rules; some limited exceptions apply. Players may hold more than one non-FIFA nationality.

No.	Pos.	Nation	Player
—	DF	POR	Emídio Rafael (from (Portugal) Estoril)
—	FW	POR	Rabiola (from (Portugal) Penafiel)
—	GK	POR	Pedro Trigueira (from (Portugal) União da Madeira)
—	MF	FRA	Selim Bouadla (from (Hungary) Debrecen)
—	DF	BRA	William Gustavo (on loan from (Brazil) Grêmio Anápolis)
—	MF	BFA	Nii Plange (from (Portugal) Vitória de Guimarães)
—	FW	POR	Gonçalo Paciência (on loan from (Portugal) Porto)
—	MF	POR	Leandro Silva (on loan from (Portugal) Porto)

Out: Note: Flags indicate national team as defined under FIFA eligibility rules; some limited exceptions apply. Players may hold more than one non-FIFA nationality.

No.	Pos.	Nation	Player
1	GK	POR	Cristiano (loan return to (Portugal) Braga)
3	DF	POR	Aníbal Capela (loan return to (Portugal) Braga)
11	FW	CIV	Magique (loaned to (Turkey) Şanlıurfaspor)
12	FW	GUI	Salim Cissé (loan return to (Portugal) Sporting CP)
19	FW	MLI	Ulysse Diallo (to (Portugal) Marítimo)
21	MF	BRA	Marcos Paulo (to (Greece) Panetolikos)
23	MF	CMR	Edgar Salli (loan return to (France) Monaco)
47	DF	POR	Ricardo Esgaio (loan return to (Portugal) Sporting CP)
92	DF	BRA	Lucas Mineiro (Contract terminated)

==== Winter ====
In: Note: Flags indicate national team as defined under FIFA eligibility rules; some limited exceptions apply. Players may hold more than one non-FIFA nationality.

No.	Pos.	Nation	Player
—	DF	POR	Rafa (on loan from (Portugal) Porto)
—	MF	CIV	Inters Gui (on loan from (Portugal) Vitória de Guimarães)

Out: Note: Flags indicate national team as defined under FIFA eligibility rules; some limited exceptions apply. Players may hold more than one non-FIFA nationality.

No.	Pos.	Nation	Player

== Technical staff ==
Position	Name
Head coach	Filipe Gouveia
Assistant coach	Miguel Pinto; Sérgio Carvalho; João Veloso
Goalkeeping coach	Ricardo Fonseca

Source: Académica
