= 2014–15 Associação Académica de Coimbra – O.A.F. season =

Académica
2014–15 season
- President: (Portugal) José Eduardo Simões
- Coach: (Portugal) José Viterbo
- Stadium: Estádio Cidade de Coimbra
- Primeira Liga: 15
- Taça de Portugal: Third Round
- Taça da Liga: Second Round
- Top goalscorer: League: Marinho; All: Marinho
- Highest home attendance: 19,092
- Lowest home attendance: 443
- Average home league attendance: 5,158

This article shows Associação Académica de Coimbra – O.A.F.'s player statistics and all matches that the club plays during the 2014–15 season. This season will be their 13th consecutive season in the top-flight of Portuguese football.

== Competitions ==
Win Draw Loss Postponed

=== Pre-season ===
19 July 2014	Feirense	0–0	Académica
10:30

22 July 2014	Braga	2–0	Académica
17:00	Éder 19'; Zé Luís 74'

26 July 2014	Arouca	0–0	Académica
10:30

31 July 2014	Académica	0–0	Deportivo La Coruña (Spain)
21:00

2 August 2014	Nacional	0–2	Académica
10:00			Rui Pedro 37'; Pedro Nuno 84'

6 August 2014	Académica	5–0	Naval
19:00	Rui Pedro (?); Marcos Paulo (?); Schumacher (?); Lopes (?)

9 August 2014	Sanjoaonense	0-3	Académica
10:00			Schumacher 42'; Pedro Nuno 70'; Magique 88'

12 August 2014	Porto	3–0	Académica
	Adrián 16'; Brahimi 57'; Kelvin 90+2'

=== Primeira Liga ===
==== League table ====
Pos	Team	Pld	W	D	L	GF	GA	GD	Pts	Qualification or relegation
13	Boavista	34	9	7	18	27	50	−23	34	
14	Vitória de Setúbal	34	7	8	19	24	56	−32	29	
15	Académica	34	4	17	13	26	46	−20	29	
16	Arouca	34	7	7	20	26	50	−24	28	
17	Gil Vicente (R)	34	4	11	19	25	60	−35	23	Relegation to LigaPro

Source: LPFP
Rules for classification: 1) points; 2) points in matches between tied teams; 3) goal difference in matches between tied teams; 4) away goals in matches between tied teams; 5) goal difference; 6) wins; 7) goals scored. The LPFP decided that only criteria 1, 5, 6 and 7 would be applied to establish the classification during the competition. Qualification for the 2015–16 Europa League has changed: the best-placed non-qualified domestic championship club will enter the UEFA Europa League from the 2015–16 season, rather than the domestic cup runners-up, should the domestic cup winners also qualify for the UEFA Champions League via the final championship standings.
(R) Relegated

==== Results by round ====
Round	1	2	3	4	5	6	7	8	9	10	11	12	13	14	15	16	17	18	19	20	21	22	23	24	25	26	27	28	29	30	31	32	33	34
Ground	H	A	H	A	H	A	H	A	H	A	H	H	A	H	A	H	A	A	H	A	H	A	H	A	H	A	H	A	A	H	A	H	A	H
Result	D	L	D	L	D	W	D	L	D	L	L	L	D	D	D	D	L	L	D	D	D	W	D	W	W	D	D	L	L	L	D	D	L	L
Position	8	11	13	16	16	12	11	14	12	14	15	15	15	15	15	16	17	17	17	17	17	16	15	14	13	14	14	14	14	14	14	14	14	15

Updated to match(es) played on 1 March 2015. Source: LPFP
A = Away; H = Home; W = Win; D = Draw; L = Loss

==== Matches ====
16 August 2014 1	Académica de Coimbra	1–1	Sporting CP	Coimbra
20:30h	Lopes 90'	Report	Carrillo 16'	Stadium: Estádio Cidade de Coimbra; Attendance: 19,092; Referee: Artur Soares Dias

23 August 2014 2	Maritimo	2–1	Académica de Coimbra	Funchal
17:00h	Fransérgio 53'; Maâzou 55'	Report	Rui Pedro 83'	Stadium: Estádio dos Barreiros; Attendance: 3,231; Referee: Vasco Santos

29 August 2014 3	Académica de Coimbra	1–1	Vitória de Setúbal	Coimbra
20:00	Nascimento 7'	Report	Venâncio 18'	Stadium: Estádio Cidade de Coimbra; Attendance: 3,003; Referee: Manuel Mota

14 September 2014 4	Boavista	1–0	Académica de Coimbra	Porto
16:00	Ofori 56' (o.g.)	Report		Stadium: Estádio do Bessa XXI; Attendance: 3,187; Referee: Bruno Esteves

22 September 2014 5	Académica de Coimbra	2–2	Estoril	Coimbra
20:00	Schumacher 31'; Marinho 38'	Report	Kuca 44', 70'	Stadium: Estádio Cidade de Coimbra; Attendance: 4,222; Referee: Rui Costa

28 September 2014 6	Arouca	0–1	Académica de Coimbra	Arouca
16:00		Report	Rui Pedro 8'	Stadium: Estádio Municipal de Arouca; Attendance: 1,150; Referee: Cosme Machado

5 October 2014 7	Académica de Coimbra	0–0	Moreirense	Coimbra
16:00h	Alexandre (yellow card) 58'	Summary	Cardozo (yellow card) 68'; Cunha (yellow card) 81'; Marques (yellow card) 88'	Stadium: Estádio Cidade de Coimbra; Attendance: 2,905; Referee: Fábio Veríssimo

26 October 2014 8	Nacional	1–0	Académica de Coimbra	Funchal
16:00	Gomaa (yellow card) 31'; Rondón (yellow card) 55'; Matias 66'; Marçal (yellow card) 88'; Willyan (yellow card) 90+5'	Summary	Lino (yellow card) 18'; Silva (yellow card) 42'; Salli (yellow card) 77'	Stadium: Estádio da Madeira; Attendance: 2,200; Referee: Jorge Sousa

2 November 2014 9	Académica de Coimbra	1–1	Braga	Coimbra
19:15	Silva 66'	Summary	Éder 66'	Stadium: Estádio Cidade de Coimbra; Attendance: 3,263; Referee: Bruno Paixão

10 November 2014 10	Rio Ave	3–0	Académica de Coimbra	Vila do Conde
20:00	Tarantini (yellow card) 23'; Hassan 36', 40'; Ukra (yellow card) 60', (goal) 65'	Summary	Magique (yellow card) 54'	Stadium: Estádio dos Arcos; Attendance: 1,300; Referee: Pedro Proença

30 November 2014 11	Académica de Coimbra	0–2	Benfica	Coimbra
18:00 WET (UTC±00:00)	Alexandre (yellow card) 19'; Marcos Paulo (yellow card) 42'; Rui Pedro (yellow card) 55'; Ivanildo (yellow card) 70'; Marinho (yellow card) 86' (red card) 90+5'	Report	Gaitán 8'; Jonas (yellow card) 39'; Luisão 45'; Almeida (yellow card) 61'; Pereira (yellow card) 67'; Jardel (yellow card) 73'	Stadium: Estádio Cidade de Coimbra; Attendance: 12,582; Referee: Jorge Ferreira

6 December 2014 12	Académica de Coimbra	0–3	Porto	Coimbra
20:15		Report	Martínez 13', 24'; Herrera 47'	Stadium: Estádio Cidade de Coimbra; Attendance: 7,189; Referee: Manuel Mota

13 December 2014 13	Gil Vicente	1–1	Académica de Coimbra	Barcelos
16:00	Paulinho 76'	Report	Lopes 57'	Stadium: Estádio Cidade de Barcelos; Attendance: 1,628; Referee: Duarte Gomes

21 December 2014 14	Académica de Coimbra	1–1	Penafiel	Coimbra
16:00	Ivanildo 69'	Report	Quiñones 49'	Stadium: Estádio Cidade de Coimbra; Attendance: 2,458; Referee: Cosme Machado

2 January 2015 15	Belenenses	0–0	Académica de Coimbra	Lisbon
20:30		Report		Stadium: Estádio do Restelo; Attendance: 1,954; Referee: João Capela

10 January 2015 16	Académica de Coimbra	2–2	Paços de Ferreira	Coimbra
18:00	Marcos Paulo 50'; Lucas Mineiro 83'	Report	Rafael 59'; Vasco Rocha 90+4'	Stadium: Estádio Cidade de Coimbra; Attendance: 2,004; Referee: Rui Rodrigues

17 January 2015 17	Vitória de Guimarães	4–0	Académica de Coimbra	Guimarães
19:00 CET	Valente 16'; André 35' (pen.); Tomané 40'; Hernâni 81', (yellow card) 81'	Report	Ofori (yellow card) 21'	Stadium: Estádio D. Afonso Henriques; Attendance: 11,759; Referee: Vasco Santos

25 January 2015 18	Sporting CP	1–0	Académica de Coimbra	Lisbon
16:00	João Mário 76'	Report		Stadium: Estádio José Alvalade; Attendance: 37,769; Referee: Rui Costa

1 February 2015 19	Académica de Coimbra	1–1	Marítimo	Coimbra
16:00	Silva 54'	Report	Costa 21'	Stadium: Estádio Cidade de Coimbra; Attendance: 2,410; Referee: Manuel Oliveira

8 February 2015 20	Vitória de Setúbal	0–0	Académica de Coimbra	Setúbal
16:00		Report		Stadium: Estádio do Bonfim; Attendance: 2,265; Referee: Fábio Veríssimo

15 February 2015 21	Académica de Coimbra	0–0	Boavista	Coimbra
17:00		Report		Stadium: Estádio Cidade de Coimbra; Attendance: 2,364; Referee: Luís Ferreira

8 February 2015 22	Estoril	1–2	Académica de Coimbra	Estoril
17:00	Bonatini 84'	Report	Marinho 8'; Rui Pedro 73'	Stadium: Estádio António Coimbra da Mota; Attendance: 1,346; Referee: Artur Soares Dias

1 March 2015 23	Académica de Coimbra	1–1	Arouca	Coimbra
16:00	Marinho 8'; Real (yellow card) 52'; I. Santos (yellow card) 63'; Obiora (yellow card) 78'; Diallo (yellow card) 90+1'	Report	Oliveira (yellow card) 38' (yellow-red card) 82'; Pintassilgo (yellow card) 55'; Medeiros (yellow card) 69'; Simão 71' (pen.); Sampaio (yellow card) 85'; Goicoechea (yellow card) 89'	Stadium: Estádio Cidade de Coimbra; Attendance: 3,147; Referee: Jorge Sousa

8 March 2015 24	Moreirense	0–2	Académica de Coimbra	Moreira de Cónegos
17:00		Report	Rui Pedro 84' (pen.), 90+5'	Stadium: Parque de Jogos Comendador Joaquim de Almeida Freitas; Attendance: 1,296; Referee: Rui Rodrigues

15 March 2015 25	Académica de Coimbra	2–1	Nacional	Coimbra
16:00	Marcos Paulo 29'; Lucas Mineiro 85'	Report	Matias 90+4'	Stadium: Estádio Cidade de Coimbra; Attendance: 6,321; Referee: Nuno Almeida

20 March 2015 26	Braga	0–0	Académica de Coimbra	Braga
20:30		Report		Stadium: Estádio Municipal de Braga; Attendance: 8,819; Referee: Bruno Paixão

3 April 2015 27	Académica de Coimbra	0–0	Rio Ave	Coimbra
16:00		Report		Stadium: Estádio Cidade de Coimbra; Attendance: 3,928; Referee: Hugo Miguel

11 April 2015 28	Benfica	5–1	Académica de Coimbra	Lisbon
17:00	Jardel 8'; Jonas 11', 53'; Lima 19' (pen.); Fejsa 84'	Report	Lopes 80'	Stadium: Estádio da Luz; Attendance: 56,197; Referee: Luís Ferreira

18 April 2015 29	Porto	1-0	Académica de Coimbra	Porto
18:00	Hernâni 11'	Report		Stadium: Estádio do Dragão; Attendance: 36,117; Referee: Duarte Gomes

25 April 2015 30	Académica de Coimbra	1–2	Gil Vicente	Coimbra
17:00	Rui Pedro 26'	Report	Ribeiro 38'; Cadú 67'	Stadium: Estádio Cidade de Coimbra; Attendance: 4,614; Referee: Artur Soares Dias

3 May 2015 31	Penafiel	0–0	Académica de Coimbra	Penafiel
16:00		Report		Stadium: Estádio Municipal 25 de Abril; Attendance: 558

9 May 2015 32	Académica de Coimbra	1–1	Belenenses	Coimbra
18:30	Lopes 78'	Report	Nunes 90+1'	Stadium: Estádio Cidade de Coimbra; Attendance: 4,684; Referee: Manuel Mota

17 May 2015 33	Paços de Ferreira	3–2	Académica de Coimbra	Paços de Ferreira
18:00	Jota 45', 74'; Farias 60'	Report	A. Silva 53'; Real 55'	Stadium: Estádio da Mata Real; Attendance: 3,508; Referee: Nuno Almeida

23 May 2015 34	Académica de Coimbra	2–4	Vitória de Guimarães	Coimbra
20:15	Pedro Nuno 39'; Ivanildo 69'	Report	Valente 35', 90+4'; Otávio 53'; Tomané 59'	Stadium: Estádio Cidade de Coimbra; Attendance: 3,498; Referee: Marco Ferreira

=== Taça de Portugal ===
==== Third round ====
19 October 2014	Santa Maria	1-0	Académica de Coimbra	Galegos (Santa Maria)
15:00 WEST (UTC+01:00)	Veiga 23' (pen.)	Report		Stadium: Estádio da Devesa; Attendance: - Referee: João Capela

=== Taça da Liga ===
==== Third round ====
Pos	Team	Pld	W	D	L	GF	GA	GD	Pts	Qualification
1	Porto (A)	4	3	1	0	9	3	+6	10	Advances to the knockout phase
2	Braga (E)	4	2	1	1	5	3	+2	7	
3	Académica de Coimbra (E)	4	2	0	2	5	6	−1	6	
4	União da Madeira (E)	4	2	0	2	6	8	−2	6	
5	Rio Ave (E)	4	0	0	4	1	6	−5	0	

Source: LPFP
Rules for classification: Tiebreakers
(A) Advance to a further round; (E) Eliminated

14 January 2015 2	Braga	1–0	Académica de Coimbra	Braga
16:30	Sousa (yellow card) 17'; Sasso 54'; Gomes (yellow card) 73'; Luíz Carlos (yellow card) 85'; Zé Luís (yellow card) 90+2'	Report	Capela (yellow card) 42'; Piloto (yellow card) 68'; Lucas Mineiro (yellow card) 79'	Stadium: Estádio Municipal de Braga; Attendance: 2,713; Referee: Marco Ferreira

21 January 2015 3	Académica de Coimbra	1–0	Rio Ave	Coimbra
17:00	Magique 65'; Lopes (yellow card) 82'	Report	Zeegelaar (yellow card) 63'	Stadium: Estádio Cidade de Coimbra; Attendance: 582; Referee: Carlos Xistra

28 January 2015 4	Porto	4–1	Académica de Coimbra	Porto
21:45 CET	Martínez 6', 59', (yellow card) 41'; Marcano (yellow card) 45'; José Ángel (yellow card) 56'; Paciência 75'; Danilo (yellow card) 78'; Evandro 80' (pen.)	Report	M'Bala Nzola 72'; Real (yellow card) 79'; Lopes (yellow card) 90+2'	Stadium: Estádio do Dragão; Attendance: 14,609; Referee: Tiago Martins

4 February 2015 5	Académica de Coimbra	3–1	União da Madeira	Coimbra
17:00 CET	Olascuaga 27'; Pedro Nuno (yellow card) 43'; Diallo (yellow card) 52'; I. Santos (yellow card) 52'; Capela 57'; Obiora (yellow card) 58'; Marinho 78'; Makonda (yellow card) 84'	Report	Chaby 11'; Wanderson (yellow card) 29'; Andrade (yellow card) 62'	Stadium: Estádio Cidade de Coimbra; Attendance: 443; Referee: Vasco Santos

== Current squad ==
As of 1 June 2015.

Note: Flags indicate national team as defined under FIFA eligibility rules; some limited exceptions apply. Players may hold more than one non-FIFA nationality.

No.	Pos.	Nation	Player
1	GK	POR	Cristiano (on loan from Braga)
3	DF	POR	Aníbal Capela (on loan from Braga)
4	MF	NGR	Nwankwo Obiora
5	DF	BRA	Ricardo Nascimento (on loan from Monte Azul)
6	DF	FRA	Tripy Makonda
7	FW	POR	Marinho
10	FW	GBS	Ivanildo Cassamá
11	FW	CIV	Magique
12	FW	GUI	Salim Cissé (on loan from Sporting CP)
13	DF	POR	João Real
14	DF	BRA	Iago Santos
17	FW	PER	Carlos Olascuaga (on loan from Universitario)
18	FW	FRA	M'Bala Nzola
19	FW	MLI	Ulysse Diallo
20	MF	POR	Rui Pedro

No.	Pos.	Nation	Player
21	MF	BRA	Marcos Paulo
22	DF	COD	Christopher Oualembo
23	FW	CMR	Edgar Salli (on loan from Monaco)
24	GK	POR	Fábio Santos
27	FW	POR	Pedro Nuno
28	MF	POR	Nuno Piloto
29	DF	BRA	Aderlan Silva
30	FW	POR	Rafael Lopes
32	GK	BRA	Lee Oliveira
37	DF	GHA	Richard Ofori
47	DF	POR	Ricardo Esgaio (on loan from Sporting CP)
65	MF	POR	Fernando Alexandre
77	FW	POR	Hugo Seco
92	MF	BRA	Lucas Mineiro

== Transfers ==
=== In ===
Date	Pos.	Name	From	Fee
21 June 2014	GK	(Portugal) Cristiano	(Portugal) Braga	1 Year Loan
27 June 2014	DF	(Democratic Republic of the Congo) Christopher Oualembo	(Poland) Lechia Gdańsk	Undisclosed
4 July 2014	FW	(Portugal) Hugo Seco	(Portugal) Benfica CB	Undisclosed
8 July 2014	FW	(Portugal) Rui Pedro	(Romania) CFR Cluj	Undisclosed
8 July 2014	DF	(Brazil) Aderlan Silva	(Brazil) Santa Rita	Undisclosed
23 July 2014	MF	(Brazil) Lee	(Brazil) Atlético Mineiro	Undisclosed
23 July 2014	MF	(Nigeria) Nwankwo Obiora	(Spain) Córdoba	Undisclosed
23 July 2014	MF	(Brazil) Lucas Mineiro	(Brazil) Vitória	Undisclosed
25 July 2014	FW	(Brazil) Schumacher	(Brazil) Ferroviária	Undisclosed
28 July 2014	DF	(Brazil) Iago Santos	(Brazil) Duque de Caxias	Undisclosed
28 July 2014	DF	(Brazil) Ricardo Nascimento	(Brazil) Monte Azul	1 Year Loan
29 July 2014	MF	(Peru) Carlos Olascuaga	(Peru) Universitario	2 Year Loan
29 July 2014	DF	(Brazil) Lino	(Greece) PAOK	Undisclosed
22 August 2014	FW	(Cameroon) Edgar Salli	(France) Monaco	1 Year Loan

=== Out ===
Date	Pos.	Name	To	Fee
5 December 2014	DF	(Brazil) Lino	(Brazil) Londrina	Free
27 January 2015	DF	(Brazil) Schumacher	Unattached	Free
2 February 2015	MF	(Cape Verde) Jimmy	(Portugal) Santa Clara	6 Month Loan
