= 2015–16 S.L. Benfica season =

Benfica
2015–16 season
- President: Luís Filipe Vieira
- Manager: Rui Vitória
- Stadium: Estádio da Luz
- Primeira Liga: 1st
- Taça de Portugal: Fourth round
- Taça da Liga: Winners
- Supertaça Cândido de Oliveira: Runners-up
- UEFA Champions League: Quarter-finals
- Top goalscorer: League: Jonas (32); All: Jonas (36)
- Highest home attendance: 64,235 v Nacional (15 May 2016)
- Lowest home attendance: 20,107 v Nacional (29 December 2015)
- Average home league attendance: 50,322
- Biggest win: Benfica 6–0 Belenenses (11 September 2015); Benfica 6–0 Marítimo (6 January 2016)
- Biggest defeat: Benfica 0–3 Sporting CP (25 October 2015)
Home colours	Away colours

The 2015–16 season was Sport Lisboa e Benfica's 112th season in existence and the club's 82nd consecutive season in the top flight of Portuguese football. It started on 9 August 2015 and concluded on 20 May 2016.

Benfica played in the Primeira Liga as the two-time defending champions after being crowned for a record 34th time, in the previous campaign. On 15 May, Benfica won their third consecutive league title (for the sixth time in their history and first since 1977), and their 35th overall, with a Portuguese record of 88 points out of the possible maximum of 102 (34 matches). Five days later, Benfica won their third consecutive league cup title, their seventh overall in nine editions, beating Marítimo 6–2 in the final. Internationally, Benfica reached the quarter-finals of the UEFA Champions League, where they were eliminated by Bayern Munich 2–3 on aggregate.

== Season overview ==
=== Pre-season ===
After six years as club manager, Jorge Jesus left Benfica for rivals Sporting. As a result, the board appointed Rui Vitória as the new coach.

The pre-season began on 2 July 2015, followed by five matches: a 3–2 loss against PSG, a 0–0 draw with Fiorentina, a 2–1 loss to New York Red Bulls, a 0–0 draw with Club América, and a 3–0 loss to C.F. Monterrey in the eighth edition of the Eusébio Cup at Monterrey in Mexico, held to inaugurate the Estadio BBVA Bancomer.

=== August-October ===
On 9 August, Benfica played their first official match of the season in the 2015 Supertaça Cândido de Oliveira against Sporting CP, losing 1–0.

After the loss to Sporting, Benfica started the league with a 4–0 win over Estoril, followed by a 1–0 away loss to Arouca and a 3–2 home win over Moreirense. In October, Benfica recorded a 6–0 home win over Belenenses and a 2–0 home win over Astana in its Champions League debut. This was followed by a 1–0 away loss to Porto, a 3–2 home win over Paços de Ferreira, and a 2–1 away win over Atlético Madrid in the Champions League, finishing the month two points behind Sporting and Porto.

October started with a 2–1 away win over Vianense in the third round of the Taça de Portugal, followed by a 2–1 away loss to Galatasaray in the Champions League and a 3–0 home loss to Sporting in the league. During the game, even with the team trailing 3–0, Benfica supporters chanted the song "Eu amo o Benfica." The month ended with a 4–0 away win over Tondela.

=== November-January ===
In November, Benfica beat Galatasaray 2–1 at home in the Champions League, defeated Boavista 2–0 at home, drew 2–2 with Astana away in the Champions League, and won 2–0 away over Braga. The most notable result came in the fourth round of the Taça de Portugal, when Benfica visited Estádio José Alvalade and lost 2–1 after extra time. Benfica ended the month out of the Taça de Portugal and seven points behind Sporting.

In December, Benfica won 3–0 at home against Académica, lost 2–1 at home to Atlético Madrid in the Champions League, won 4–2 at home against Vitória de Setúbal, drew 0–0 away with União da Madeira (a match originally scheduled for 4 October, but postponed), defeated Rio Ave 3–1 at home, and beat Nacional 1–0 in the Taça da Liga, finishing the year five points behind Sporting.

The new year started with a successful run: a 1–0 away win over Vitória de Guimarães, followed by a 6–0 away win over Marítimo, a 4–1 away win over Nacional, a 2–1 away win over Estoril, a 1–0 away win over Oriental in the Taça da Liga, a 3–1 home win over Arouca, a 6–1 away win over Moreirense in the Taça da Liga, and a 4–1 away league win over Moreirense, reducing Sporting’s lead to two points and qualifying for the Taça da Liga semi-finals.

=== February-March ===
Benfica continued their winning streak in February with a 5–0 away victory over Belenenses, followed by a 2–1 home loss to Porto, which ended an eleven-match winning run. The team responded with a 1–0 home win over Zenit in the Champions League round of 16 first leg, followed by a 3–1 away win over Paços de Ferreira and a 2–0 home win over União da Madeira, finishing the month one point behind Sporting.

March began with a decisive league match against Sporting. Benfica entered the game after three consecutive defeats, two of which cost them trophies, and Sporting were considered favourites due to home advantage. However, Benfica won 1–0 with a goal from Kostas Mitroglou in the 20th minute, climbing to first place for the first time that season. Following this victory, Benfica defeated Zenit 2–1 away to qualify for the Champions League quarter-finals, beat Tondela 4–1 at home, overcame Boavista 1–0 away with an injury-time goal from Jonas, and won 5–1 at home against Braga.

=== April-May ===
In the 5th of April, Benfica faced FC Bayern Munich in Germany, losing 1-0 in the first leg of the quarter-finals. On the returned leg Benfica scored first with a goal from Raúl Jiménez tying the round, but two goals from Bayern gave Bayern the advantage, with Talisca drawing the game with a free-kick, ending 2-2 which meant Bayern advanced to the semi-finals. Stil in April wins over Académica, Vitória de Setúbal, Rio Ave and Vitória de Guimarães continued Benfica league winning streak to keep a two point advantage.

Benfica started May with a 2-1 win over Braga in the Taça da Liga semi-final, followed by a 2-0 over Maritimo away in which the team played with 10-men for almost an hour. On the 15 of May Benfica hosted Nacional, beating them 4-1 and claiming its 35th league title and its first "tricampeonato" since 1976-77. In the Taça da Liga Final, Benfica beat Maritimo 6-1, in a what was the last game of Nicolás Gaitán and breaktrough player Renato Sanches.

== Players ==
=== Squad information ===
N	Pos.	Nat.	Name	Age	Since	App	Goals	Ends	Transfer fee	Notes
1	GK	(Brazil)	Ederson M.	22	2015	18	0	2020	Undisclosed	Originally from youth system
2	CB	(Argentina)	Lisandro	26	2014	29	1	2018	Undisclosed	
3	LB	(Spain)	Grimaldo	20	2016 (Winter)	5	0	2021	€2,121,000	
4	CB	(Brazil)	Luisão (captain)	35	2003	475	44	2017	Undisclosed	
5	DM	(Serbia)	Fejsa	27	2013	61	1	2019	Undisclosed	
7	CM	(Greece)	Samaris	27	2014	78	2	2019	€10,000,000	
9	ST	(Mexico)	Raúl	25	2015	45	12	2020	Undisclosed	
10	AM	(Argentina)	Nico Gaitán (VC)	28	2010	253	41	2019	€8,400,000	
11	ST	(Greece)	Mitroglou	28	2015	45	25	2016	Loan	
12	GK	(Brazil)	Júlio César	36	2014	64	0	2016	Free	
13	GK	(Portugal)	Paulo Lopes	38	2012	10	0	2016	Free	Originally from youth system
14	DF	(Sweden)	V. Lindelöf	21	2014	26	1	2020	Youth system	Promoted from Benfica B
17	ST	(Brazil)	Jonas	32	2014	83	67	2018	Free	
18	RW	(Argentina)	Salvio	25	2012	162	38	2017	€13,500,000	Played as a loanee in the 2010–11 season
19	LB	(Portugal)	Eliseu	32	2014	77	4	2016	Undisclosed	
20	RW	(Portugal)	G. Guedes	19	2014	40	4	2021	Youth system	Promoted from Benfica B
21	CM	(Portugal)	Pizzi	26	2014	78	12	2019	€14,000,000	
28	FB	(Portugal)	Sílvio	28	2013	39	0	2016	Loan	Originally from youth system
30	AM	(Brazil)	A. Talisca	22	2014	78	20	2019	€4,000,000	
33	CB	(Brazil)	Jardel	30	2011 (Winter)	166	11	2020	Undisclosed	
34	DM	(Portugal)	A. Almeida	25	2012	132	0	2018	Undisclosed	
35	ST	(Serbia)	Luka	18	2016 (Winter)	2	0	2021	€6,583,000	
38	LW	(Portugal)	N. Santos	21	2015	2	0	2021	Youth system	Promoted from Benfica B
39	AM	(Morocco)	Carcela G.	26	2015	29	3	2019	Free	
50	RB	(Portugal)	N. Semedo	22	2015	18	1	2021	Undisclosed	Promoted from Benfica B
85	MF	(Portugal)	R. Sanches	18	2015	35	2	2021	Youth system	Promoted from Benfica B

- Source: Plantel Principal
- Ordered by squad number.

=== Transfers ===
==== In ====
Date	Pos	No.	Player	Age	From	Ends	Fee	Ref
20 May 2015	MF	—	(Venezuela) Jhon Murillo	19	(Venezuela) Zamora FC	2020	Undisclosed	
26 May 2015	MF	—	(Brazil) Diego Lopes	21	(Portugal) Rio Ave	2020	€726,600	
26 May 2015	GK	1	(Brazil) Ederson	21	(Portugal) Rio Ave	2020	Undisclosed	
27 May 2015	DF	3	(Brazil) Marçal	26	(Portugal) Nacional	2020	Undisclosed	
27 May 2015	MF	—	(Portugal) Pelé	23	Unattached	2020	Undisclosed	
12 June 2015	MF	23	(Morocco) Adel Taarabt	26	(England) Queens Park Rangers	2020	€4,000,000	
13 June 2015	MF	39	(Morocco) Mehdi Carcela	25	(Belgium) Standard Liège	2019	Undisclosed	
13 August 2015	FW	9	(Mexico) Raúl Jiménez	24	(Spain) Atlético Madrid	2020	Undisclosed	
29 December 2015	DF	3	(Spain) Álex Grimaldo	20	(Spain) Barcelona	2021	€2,121,000	
2 February 2016	FW	35	(Serbia) Luka Jović	18	(Serbia) Red Star Belgrade	2021	€6,583,000	

==== Loan in ====
Date	Pos	No.	Player	Age	From	Ends	Fee	Ref
15 July 2015	DF	28	(Portugal) Sílvio	27	(Spain) Atlético Madrid	30 June 2016	Free	
6 August 2015	FW	11	(Greece) Kostas Mitroglou	27	(England) Fulham	30 June 2016	Undisclosed	

==== Out ====
Date	Pos	No.	Player	Age	To	Fee	Ref
25 May 2015	DF	—	(Portugal) João Cancelo	20	(Spain) Valencia	Undisclosed	
9 June 2015	MF	8	(Serbia) Miralem Sulejmani	26	(Switzerland) Young Boys	Undisclosed	
12 June 2015	FW	—	(Argentina) Rogelio Funes Mori	24	(Mexico) Monterrey	Undisclosed	
12 June 2015	MF	—	(Portugal) André Gomes	21	(Spain) Valencia	End of contract	
15 June 2015	FW	—	(Spain) Rodrigo	24	(Spain) Valencia	End of contract	
23 June 2015	DF	23	(Switzerland) Loris Benito	23	(Switzerland) Young Boys	Undisclosed	
30 June 2015	MF	—	(Brazil) Airton	25	Unattached	End of contract	
30 June 2015	GK	1	(Brazil) Artur	34	Unattached	End of contract	
30 June 2015	DF	14	(Uruguay) Maxi Pereira	31	Unattached	End of contract	
10 July 2015	FW	19	(Portugal) Ivan Cavaleiro	21	(France) Monaco	Undisclosed	
24 July 2015	FW	11	(Brazil) Lima	32	(United Arab Emirates) Al Ahli Club	€7,000,000	
2 February 2016	FW	—	(Portugal) Yannick Djaló	29	(Thailand) Ratchaburi	End of contract	

==== Loan out ====
Date	Pos	No.	Player	Age	To	Ends	Ref
10 July 2015	FW	32	(Portugal) Bebé	24	(Spain) Rayo Vallecano	30 June 2016	
10 July 2015	MF	67	(Portugal) Hélder Costa	21	(France) Monaco	30 June 2016	
16 July 2015	MF	—	(Venezuela) Jhon Murillo	19	(Portugal) Tondela	30 June 2016	
18 July 2015	DF	37	(Brazil) César	22	(Brazil) Flamengo	30 June 2016	
20 July 2015	FW	9	(Brazil) Derley	27	(Turkey) Kayserispor	30 June 2016	
22 July 2015	MF	—	(Brazil) Diego Lopes	21	(Turkey) Kayserispor	30 June 2016	
30 July 2015	FW	83	(Portugal) Rui Fonte	25	(Portugal) Braga	30 June 2016	
1 August 2015	MF	—	(Portugal) Pelé	23	(Portugal) Paços de Ferreira	30 June 2016	
7 August 2015	FW	—	(Portugal) Yannick Djaló	29	(Russia) Mordovia Saransk	31 December 2015	
14 August 2015	MF	6	(Portugal) Ruben Amorim	30	(Qatar) Al-Wakrah	30 June 2016	
20 August 2015	DF	3	(Brazil) Marçal	26	(Turkey) Gaziantepspor	30 June 2016	
28 August 2015	MF	27	(Germany) Hany Mukhtar	20	(Austria) Red Bull Salzburg	30 June 2016	
31 August 2015	MF	—	(Portugal) Daniel Candeias	27	(France) Metz	30 June 2016	
1 September 2015	MF	15	(Netherlands) Ola John	23	(England) Reading	30 June 2016	
1 September 2015	DF	—	(Brazil) Sidnei	26	(Spain) Deportivo La Coruña	30 June 2016	
4 September 2015	FW	16	(Portugal) Nélson Oliveira	24	(England) Nottingham Forest	30 June 2016	
8 January 2016	MF	24	(Italy) Bryan Cristante	20	(Italy) Palermo	30 June 2016	
25 January 2016	MF	22	(Serbia) Filip Đuričić	23	(Belgium) Anderlecht	30 June 2016	
1 February 2016	MF	31	(Brazil) Victor Andrade	20	(Portugal) Vitória de Guimarães	30 June 2016	

== Technical staff ==
Position	Name
Head coach	Rui Vitória
Assistant coach	Arnaldo Teixeira; Sérgio Botelho; Minervino Pietra; Marco Pedroso
Fitness coach	Paulo Mourão
Goalkeeping coach	Hugo Oliveira
Benfica LAB coordinator	Bruno Mendes

Source: Equipa Técnica

== Pre-season friendlies ==
Win Draw Loss

18 July 2015 International Champions Cup	Benfica	2–3	Paris Saint-Germain	Toronto, Ontario, Canada
20:30 EDT (UTC−04:00)	Talisca 34'; Jonas 42'; López (yellow card) 89'		Kimpembe (yellow card) 23'; Augustin 29'; Lucas (yellow card) 60' (goal) 64' (pen.); Digne 79'	Stadium: BMO Field; Attendance: 20,000; Referee: Drew Fischer (Canada)

24 July 2015 International Champions Cup	Benfica	0–0 (4–5 p)	Fiorentina	East Hartford, Connecticut, United States
20:00 EDT (UTC−04:00)	Luisão (yellow card) 29' (yellow-red card) 66'		Basanta (yellow card) 15'; Rodríguez (yellow card) 29'; Alonso (yellow card) 35'; Iličić (yellow card) 44'; Hegazi (yellow card) 74'; Badelj (yellow card) 90'	Stadium: Rentschler Field; Attendance: 15,791; Referee: Sorin Stoica (United States)
	Penalties
	Almeida (penalty scored); Pizzi (penalty scored); Sílvio (penalty scored); Oliveira (penalty scored); Carcela (penalty missed)		(penalty scored) Pasqual; (penalty scored) Badelj; (penalty scored) Iličić; (penalty scored) Rebić; (penalty scored) Suárez

26 July 2015 International Champions Cup	New York Red Bulls	2–1	Benfica	Harrison, New Jersey, United States
19:30 EDT (UTC−04:00)	Wright-Phillips 33'; Robles (yellow card) 45'; Grella 56'; Miller (yellow card) 85'		Pizzi 7' (yellow card) 20'	Stadium: Red Bull Arena; Referee: Alex Chilowicz (United States)

28 July 2015 International Champions Cup	Club América	0–0 (3–4 p)	Benfica	Mexico City, Mexico
21:00 CDT (UTC−05:00)	Alvarado (yellow card) 15'; Güémez (yellow card) 32'; Arroyo (yellow card) 54'; Burón (red card) 70'		Marçal (yellow card) 85'	Stadium: Estadio Azteca; Referee: Jorge Castillo (Mexico)
	Penalties
	Martínez (penalty missed); Zúñiga (penalty scored); Marín (penalty scored); Colula (penalty scored); Rosel (penalty missed)		(penalty scored) Cristante; (penalty missed) Gaitán; (penalty scored) Santos; (penalty scored) Samaris; (penalty scored) Rodríguez

2 August 2015 Eusébio Cup	Monterrey	3–0	Benfica	Monterrey, Mexico
22:00 CDT (UTC−05:00)	Ramírez 49'; Funes Mori 58' (pen.); Rivera 81'			Stadium: Estadio BBVA Bancomer; Attendance: 51,000; Referee: Francisco Chacón (Mexico)

== Competitions ==
=== Overall record ===
Performance by competition
Competition	Starting round	Final position/round	First match	Last match
Primeira Liga	—N/a	1st	16 August 2015	15 May 2016
Taça de Portugal	Third round	Fourth round	16 October 2015	21 November 2015
Taça da Liga	Third round	Winners	29 December 2015	20 May 2016
Supertaça Cândido de Oliveira	—N/a	Runners-up	9 August 2015	
UEFA Champions League	Group stage	Quarter-finals	15 September 2015	13 April 2016

Statistics by competition
Competition	Pld	W	D	L	GF	GA	GD	Win%
Primeira Liga	34	29	1	4	88	22	+66	85.29
Taça de Portugal	2	1	0	1	3	3	+0	50.00
Taça da Liga	5	5	0	0	16	4	+12	100.00
Supertaça Cândido de Oliveira	1	0	0	1	0	1	−1	0.00
UEFA Champions League	10	5	2	3	15	12	+3	50.00
Total	52	40	3	9	122	42	+80	76.92

=== Supertaça Cândido de Oliveira ===
9 August 2015	Benfica	0–1	Sporting CP	Faro/Loulé
20:45 WEST (UTC+01:00)	Sílvio (yellow card) 38'; Fejsa (yellow card) 50'; Jonas (yellow card) 60'; Gaitán (yellow card) 76'	Report	Slimani (yellow card) 16'; Gutiérrez 53'; A. Silva (yellow card) 57'; Pereira (yellow card) 58'; Carrillo (yellow card) 63'	Stadium: Estádio Algarve; Attendance: 28,717; Referee: Jorge Sousa (Porto); Man of the Match: André Carrillo

=== Primeira Liga ===
==== League table ====
Pos	Team	Pld	W	D	L	GF	GA	GD	Pts	Qualification or relegation
1	Benfica (C)	34	29	1	4	88	22	+66	88	Qualification for the Champions League group stage
2	Sporting CP	34	27	5	2	79	21	+58	86	Qualification for the Champions League group stage
3	Porto	34	23	4	7	67	30	+37	73	Qualification for the Champions League play-off round
4	Braga	34	16	10	8	54	35	+19	58	Qualification for the Europa League group stage (Note: Braga qualified for the Europa League group stage by winning the 2015–16 Taça de Portugal.)
5	Arouca	34	13	15	6	47	38	+9	54	Qualification for the Europa League third qualifying round

Source: Liga Portugal, Soccerway
Rules for classification: 1) Points; 2) Head-to-head points; 3) Head-to-head goal difference; 4) Head-to-head away goals scored; 5) Goal difference; 6) Matches won; 7) Goals scored; 8) Play-off.
(Note: LPFP decided that only criteria 1, 5, 6 and 7 would be applied to establish the classification during the competition.)
(C) Champions

==== Results by round ====
Round	1	2	3	4	5	6	7	8	9	10	11	12	13	14	15	16	17	18	19	20	21	22	23	24	25	26	27	28	29	30	31	32	33	34
Ground	H	A	H	H	A	H	A	H	A	H	A	H	A	H	A	H	A	A	H	A	A	H	A	H	A	H	A	H	A	H	A	H	A	H
Result	W	L	W	W	L	W	D	L	W	W	W	W	W	W	W	W	W	W	W	W	W	L	W	W	W	W	W	W	W	W	W	W	W	W
Position	1	8	4	3	3	3	5	8	5	4	3	3	3	3	3	2	2	2	2	2	1	2	2	2	1	1	1	1	1	1	1	1	1	1

A = Away; H = Home; W = Win; D = Draw; L = Loss

==== Matches ====
16 August 2015 1	Benfica	4–0	Estoril	Lisbon
20:30 WEST (UTC+01:00)	López (yellow card) 16'; Mitroglou 73'; Jonas 77' (pen.), 81'; Semedo 89'	Report	Anderson Luís (yellow card) 48'; Sebá (yellow card) 67'; Gerso (yellow card) 70'; Mattheus (yellow card) 77'; Taira (yellow card) 80'; Bruno César (yellow card) 84'	Stadium: Estádio da Luz; Attendance: 53,285; Referee: Tiago Martins (Lisbon)

23 August 2015 2	Arouca	1–0	Benfica	Aveiro
19:15 WEST (UTC+01:00)	Roberto 2' (yellow card) 41'; Simão (yellow card) 22'; Lima (yellow card) 37'; Jaílson (yellow card) 74'; Bracalli (yellow card) 84'	Report	Andrade (yellow card) 80'; Mitroglou (yellow card) 88'	Stadium: Estádio Municipal de Aveiro; Attendance: 23,540; Referee: Nuno Almeida (Algarve)

29 August 2015 3	Benfica	3–2	Moreirense	Lisbon
20:45 WEST (UTC+01:00)	Pizzi (yellow card) 40'; Jiménez 75'; Samaris 76'; Jonas 87'	Report	Martins 30'; Ohemeng (yellow card) 42'; Gonçalves (yellow card) 50'; Cardozo 84' (yellow card) 90'; Boateng (yellow card) 90+2'	Stadium: Estádio da Luz; Attendance: 43,417; Referee: Jorge Ferreira (Braga)

11 September 2015 4	Benfica	6–0	Belenenses	Lisbon
20:30 WEST (UTC+01:00)	Mitroglou 5', 53'; Jonas 17', 40'; Gaitán 60'; Talisca 63'; Luisão (yellow card) 86'	Report	Camará (yellow card) 70'	Stadium: Estádio da Luz; Attendance: 42,454; Referee: Bruno Paixão (Setúbal)

20 September 2015 5	Porto	1–0	Benfica	Porto
19:15 WEST (UTC+01:00)	Pereira (yellow card) 35'; Maicon (yellow card) 55'; André (yellow card) 70' (goal) 86'; Neves (yellow card) 71'	Report	Almeida (yellow card) 50'; Semedo (yellow card) 80'; Luisão (yellow card) 83'; Mitroglou (yellow card) 84'	Stadium: Estádio do Dragão; Attendance: 49,209; Referee: Artur Soares Dias (Porto)

26 September 2015 6	Benfica	3–0	Paços de Ferreira	Lisbon
18:30 WEST (UTC+01:00)	Jonas 34', 73'; Guedes 67'	Report	Silva (yellow card) 41'; Baixinho (yellow card) 79'	Stadium: Estádio da Luz; Attendance: 45,276; Referee: Rui Costa (Porto)

4 October 2015 (Note: Match postponed due to heavy fog.) 7	União da Madeira	v	Benfica	Funchal
16:00 WET (UTC±00:00)				Stadium: Estádio da Madeira; Referee: Cosme Machado (Braga)

25 October 2015 8	Benfica	0–3	Sporting CP	Lisbon
17:00 WET (UTC±00:00)	Samaris (yellow card) 40'; Gaitán (yellow card) 43'; Fejsa (yellow card) 47'; Jonas (yellow card) 50'; Mitroglou (yellow card) 83'	Report	Gutiérrez 9'; Slimani 21' (yellow card) 43'; Ruiz 36' (yellow card) 44'; Carvalho (yellow card) 50'; A. Silva (yellow card) 58'	Stadium: Estádio da Luz; Attendance: 63,054; Referee: Carlos Xistra (Castelo Branco)

30 October 2015 9	Tondela	0–4	Benfica	Aveiro
20:30 WET (UTC±00:00)	Souza (yellow card) 24'	Report	Jonas 3'; Talisca (yellow card) 5'; Berger 11' (o.g.); Jardel (yellow card) 35'; Luisão (yellow card) 39'; Guedes 42'; Samaris (yellow card) 68'; Carcela 82'	Stadium: Estádio Municipal de Aveiro; Attendance: 9,394; Referee: Fábio Veríssimo (Leiria)

8 November 2015 10	Benfica	2–0	Boavista	Lisbon
16:00 WET (UTC±00:00)	Guedes 39'; Samaris (yellow card) 85'; Carcela 88'	Report	Figueiredo (yellow card) 53'; Carvalho (yellow card) 73'; Idris (yellow card) 78' (yellow-red card) 90+3'	Stadium: Estádio da Luz; Attendance: 46,362; Referee: Bruno Esteves (Setúbal)

30 November 2015 11	Braga	0–2	Benfica	Braga
21:00 WET (UTC±00:00)	Hassan (yellow card) 68'; Ferreira (yellow card) 72'; Filipe Augusto (yellow card) 77'	Report	Pizzi 3' (yellow card) 73'; López 11'; Eliseu (yellow card) 67'; Sanches (yellow card) 68'	Stadium: Estádio Municipal de Braga; Attendance: 17,396; Referee: Hugo Miguel (Lisbon)

4 December 2015 12	Benfica	3–0	Académica	Lisbon
20:30 WET (UTC±00:00)	Fejsa (yellow card) 18'; Jonas 35' (pen.), 79' (pen.); Sanches 85'	Report	Trigueira (yellow card) 33'; Aderlan (yellow card) 44'; Ofori (yellow card) 68'; Rabiola (yellow card) 79'	Stadium: Estádio da Luz; Attendance: 34,752; Referee: Luís Ferreira (Braga)

12 December 2015 13	Vitória de Setúbal	2–4	Benfica	Setúbal
20:45 WET (UTC±00:00)	Pinto (yellow card) 44'; Costa 59'; Suk 88'	Report	López (yellow card) 33'; Pizzi 35'; Jonas 39'; Mitroglou 54', 79'; Eliseu (yellow card) 60'; Almeida (yellow card) 65'; Samaris (yellow card) 90+3'	Stadium: Estádio do Bonfim; Attendance: 9,323; Referee: Manuel Mota (Braga)

15 December 2015 7	União da Madeira	0–0	Benfica	Funchal
21:00 WET (UTC±00:00)	Cádiz (yellow card) 42'; Gian (yellow card) 45+1'; Danilo (yellow card) 90+1'; Fidalgo (yellow card) 90+4'	Report	Sanches (yellow card) 14'; Eliseu (yellow card) 90+2'	Stadium: Estádio da Madeira; Attendance: 5,095; Referee: Cosme Machado (Braga)

20 December 2015 14	Benfica	3–1	Rio Ave	Lisbon
16:00 WET (UTC±00:00)	Jonas 4', 81'; Samaris (yellow card) 8'; Jiménez 84'	Report	Bressan 9'; Wakaso (yellow card) 29'	Stadium: Estádio da Luz; Attendance: 45,955; Referee: Manuel Oliveira (Porto)

2 January 2016 15	Vitória de Guimarães	0–1	Benfica	Guimarães
18:30 WET (UTC±00:00)	Dourado (yellow card) 11'; Otávio (yellow card) 20'; Saré (yellow card) 28'	Report	López (yellow card) 38'; Fejsa (yellow card) 39'; Sanches 74' (yellow card) 75'; Jardel (yellow card) 85'	Stadium: Estádio D. Afonso Henriques; Attendance: 22,218; Referee: Carlos Xistra (Castelo Branco)

6 January 2016 16	Benfica	6–0	Marítimo	Lisbon
19:00 WET (UTC±00:00)	Pizzi 29', 34'; Jiménez 35' (yellow card) 50'; Jonas 52' (pen.), 54' (pen.); Talisca 69'	Report	Silva (yellow card) 10'; Bessa (yellow card) 37'; João Diogo (yellow card) 49'; Sousa (yellow card) 50'; F. Ferreira (yellow card) 52'; Rodrigues (yellow card) 61'	Stadium: Estádio da Luz; Attendance: 31,590; Referee: Fábio Veríssimo (Leiria)

10 January 2016 (Note: The match was interrupted in the 8th minute because of heavy fog, and was resumed on 11 January 2016, 12:00, from the point of abandonment.) 17	Nacional	1–4	Benfica	Funchal
20:30 WET (UTC±00:00)	Soares 50'; Zainadine (yellow card) 81'	Report	Jonas 23', 56', 63'; Eliseu (yellow card) 47'; Mitroglou 89'	Stadium: Estádio da Madeira; Attendance: 4,753; Referee: Tiago Martins (Lisbon)

16 January 2016 18	Estoril	1–2	Benfica	Estoril
20:45 WET (UTC±00:00)	Bonatini 11'; Tavares (yellow card) 74'; Taira (yellow card) 86'	Report	Mitroglou 52'; Pizzi 68'; Júlio César (yellow card) 90+2'	Stadium: Estádio António Coimbra da Mota; Attendance: 7,836; Referee: Vasco Santos (Porto)

23 January 2016 19	Benfica	3–1	Arouca	Lisbon
18:30 WET (UTC±00:00)	Pizzi 3'; Almeida (yellow card) 6'; Mitroglou 19'; Jonas 68'	Report	Velázquez (yellow card) 77' (goal) 90+1'	Stadium: Estádio da Luz; Attendance: 51,511; Referee: Manuel Mota (Braga)

31 January 2016 20	Moreirense	1–4	Benfica	Moreira de Cónegos
19:15 WET (UTC±00:00)	Gomes (yellow card) 54'; Palhinha (yellow card) 81'; Medeiros 90+1'	Report	Jonas 16', 67'; Mitroglou 43'; Jardel (yellow card) 63'; Lindelöf (yellow card) 63'; Gaitán 75'	Stadium: Parque de Jogos Comendador Joaquim de Almeida Freitas; Attendance: 5,772; Referee: Manuel Oliveira (Porto)

5 February 2016 21	Belenenses	0–5	Benfica	Lisbon
20:30 WET (UTC±00:00)	Juanto (yellow card) 20'; Pinto (yellow card) 27'	Report	Mitroglou 42', 57', 75'; Jonas 53', 87'; Sílvio (yellow card) 71'; Samaris (yellow card) 81'	Stadium: Estádio do Restelo; Attendance: 13,109; Referee: Nuno Almeida (Algarve)

12 February 2016 22	Benfica	1–2	Porto	Lisbon
20:30 WET (UTC±00:00)	Mitroglou 18'; Carcela (yellow card) 79'; Sanches (yellow card) 85'; Almeida (yellow card) 88'	Report	Herrera 28' (yellow card) 30'; Aboubakar 65'; Neves (yellow card) 75'; Layún (yellow card) 88'	Stadium: Estádio da Luz; Attendance: 61,536; Referee: Artur Soares Dias (Porto)

20 February 2016 23	Paços de Ferreira	1–3	Benfica	Paços de Ferreira
18:30 WET (UTC±00:00)	Jota 23'; Moreira (yellow card) 28'; Andrezinho (yellow card) 45'; Farias (yellow card) 58'; Martins (yellow card) 81'	Report	Mitroglou 13'; Jonas 45+2' (pen.); Lindelöf 58'; Jardel (yellow card) 73'; Eliseu (yellow card) 82'	Stadium: Estádio Capital do Móvel; Attendance: 6,433; Referee: Jorge Ferreira (Braga)

29 February 2016 (Note: The match was originally to be played on 28 February 2016, during Benfica's 112th anniversary, but was postponed because União da Madeira could not fly to Lisbon.) 24	Benfica	2–0	União da Madeira	Lisbon
19:45 WET (UTC±00:00)	Jonas 4', 76'; Lindelöf (yellow card) 78'	Report	Monteiro (yellow card) 70'	Stadium: Estádio da Luz; Attendance: 44,485; Referee: Cosme Machado (Braga)

5 March 2016 25	Sporting CP	0–1	Benfica	Lisbon
20:45 WET (UTC±00:00)	Jefferson (yellow card) 70' (A. Silva (red card) 86')	Report	Mitroglou 20' (yellow card) 67'; Jonas (yellow card) 46'; Gaitán (yellow card) 52'; Sanches (yellow card) 86'	Stadium: Estádio José Alvalade; Attendance: 49,699; Referee: Artur Soares Dias (Porto)

14 March 2016 26	Benfica	4–1	Tondela	Lisbon
20:00 WET (UTC±00:00)	Jardel 11' (yellow card) 12'; Jonas 24', 69'; Mitroglou 87' (yellow card) 87'	Report	Monteiro (yellow card) 51'; Tikito (yellow card) 70'; Nathan Júnior 90+1'	Stadium: Estádio da Luz; Attendance: 51,314; Referee: Luís Ferreira (Braga)

20 March 2016 27	Boavista	0–1	Benfica	Porto
18:15 WET (UTC±00:00)	Tahar (yellow card) 60'	Report	Samaris (yellow card) 10'; Eliseu (yellow card) 45'; Jiménez (yellow card) 59'; Jonas 90+3'; Ederson (yellow card) 90+5'	Stadium: Estádio do Bessa; Attendance: 22,834; Referee: Fábio Veríssimo (Leiria)

1 April 2016 28	Benfica	5–1	Braga	Lisbon
20:30 WEST (UTC+01:00)	Mitroglou 17', 71'; Jonas 37' (pen.); Pizzi 39' (yellow card) 62'; Samaris 75'; Semedo (yellow card) 90+2'	Report	Santos (yellow card) 51' (goal) 90+3' (pen.); Stojiljković (yellow card) 72'; Luíz Carlos (yellow card) 83'; Marcelo Goiano (yellow card) 89'	Stadium: Estádio da Luz; Attendance: 61,042; Referee: Nuno Almeida (Algarve)

9 April 2016 29	Académica	1–2	Benfica	Coimbra
18:30 WEST (UTC+01:00)	Pedro Nuno 17' (yellow card) 28'; Nascimento (yellow card) 21'; Santos (yellow card) 45'; Plange (yellow card) 90+1'	Report	Mitroglou 39'; Jiménez 84'	Stadium: Estádio Cidade de Coimbra; Attendance: 26,444; Referee: João Capela (Lisbon)

18 April 2016 30	Benfica	2–1	Vitória de Setúbal	Lisbon
21:00 WEST (UTC+01:00)	Jonas 19' (yellow card) 90'; Jardel 24'	Report	Claro 1'; Lourenço (yellow card) 86'	Stadium: Estádio da Luz; Attendance: 54,855; Referee: Rui Costa (Porto)

24 April 2016 31	Rio Ave	0–1	Benfica	Vila do Conde
20:30 WEST (UTC+01:00)	Vilas Boas (yellow card) 18' (yellow-red card) 90+4'; Héldon (yellow card) 66'	Report	Eliseu (yellow card) 29'; Jardel (yellow card) 37'; Fejsa (yellow card) 41'; Jiménez 73'; Ederson (yellow card) 87'	Stadium: Estádio do Rio Ave FC; Attendance: 9,023; Referee: Artur Soares Dias (Porto)

29 April 2016 32	Benfica	1–0	Vitória de Guimarães	Lisbon
19:00 WEST (UTC+01:00)	Jardel 47'; Eliseu (yellow card) 48'; Almeida (yellow card) 54' (yellow-red card) 90+5'	Report	Pedro Henrique (yellow card) 7'; Hurtado (yellow card) 13'; Otávio (yellow card) 22'; Licá (yellow card) 35'; Josué (yellow card) 53'; X. Silva (yellow card) 80'; Vigário (yellow card) 90+2'	Stadium: Estádio da Luz; Attendance: 60,351; Referee: Bruno Paixão (Setúbal)

8 May 2016 33	Marítimo	0–2	Benfica	Funchal
20:30 WEST (UTC+01:00)	Dirceu (yellow card) 11'; Costa (yellow card) 65'; João Diogo (yellow card) 73'; Fransérgio (yellow card) 82' (yellow-red card) 89'; Deyvison (yellow card) 87'; Bessa (yellow card) 90+3'; Patrick (yellow card) 90+7'	Report	Sanches (yellow card) 27' (yellow-red card) 37'; Eliseu (yellow card) 30'; Jardel (yellow card) 43'; Mitroglou 48'; Talisca 83'	Stadium: Estádio dos Barreiros; Attendance: 9,400; Referee: Fábio Veríssimo (Leiria)

15 May 2016 34	Benfica	4–1	Nacional	Lisbon
17:00 WEST (UTC+01:00)	Gaitán 24', 64'; Talisca (yellow card) 28'; Jonas 39' (yellow card) 39'; Jardel (yellow card) 54'; Pizzi 84'	Report	Agra (yellow card) 12' (goal) 90+1'; Fofana (yellow card) 43'	Stadium: Estádio da Luz; Attendance: 64,235; Referee: Nuno Almeida (Algarve)

=== Taça de Portugal ===
==== Third round ====
16 October 2015	Vianense	1–2	Benfica	Barcelos
20:30 WEST (UTC+01:00)	R. Magalhães (yellow card) 20'; Coulibaly 79'		Fejsa (yellow card) 35'; Carcela 38'; Santos (yellow card) 72'; Jardel 90'	Stadium: Estádio Cidade de Barcelos; Attendance: 8,000; Referee: João Pinheiro (Braga)

==== Fourth round ====
21 November 2015	Sporting CP	2–1 (a.e.t.)	Benfica	Lisbon
20:00 WET (UTC±00:00)	Montero (yellow card) 43'; A. Silva 45+2'; Oliveira (yellow card) 70'; Slimani (yellow card) 84' (goal) 112'		Mitroglou 6'; Jardel (yellow card) 36'; Talisca (yellow card) 40'; Sílvio (yellow card) 45+3'; Gaitán (yellow card) 63' (Ederson (red card) 64'); Almeida (yellow card) 65'; Samaris (yellow card) 111' (yellow-red card) 114'; Jonas (yellow card) 120+1'	Stadium: Estádio José Alvalade; Attendance: 41,244; Referee: Jorge Sousa (Porto)

=== Taça da Liga ===
==== Third round ====
Pos	Team	Pld	W	D	L	GF	GA	GD	Pts	Qualification
1	Benfica	3	3	0	0	8	1	+7	9	Advance to knockout phase
2	Nacional	3	1	1	1	1	1	0	4	
3	Moreirense	3	1	1	1	5	8	−3	4	
4	Oriental	3	0	0	3	2	6	−4	0	

Source: LPFP
Rules for classification: Tiebreakers

29 December 2015 1	Benfica	1–0	Nacional	Lisbon
19:45 WET (UTC±00:00)	Lindelöf (yellow card) 24'; Eliseu (yellow card) 28'; López (yellow card) 33'; Jiménez 89'; Sílvio (yellow card) 90+2'	Report	Campos (yellow card) 38'; Sequeira (yellow card) 44'	Stadium: Estádio da Luz; Attendance: 20,107; Referee: João Capela (Lisbon)

19 January 2016 2	Oriental	0–1	Benfica	Lisbon
15:00 WET (UTC±00:00)	Tavares (yellow card) 51'	Report	Samaris (yellow card) 62'; Talisca 74'; Sanches (yellow card) 79'	Stadium: Campo Engenheiro Carlos Salema; Attendance: 3,409; Referee: Tiago Antunes (Coimbra)

26 January 2016 3	Moreirense	1–6	Benfica	Moreira de Cónegos
20:30 WET (UTC±00:00)	Andrade (yellow card) 11'; Medeiros 25'; Sousa (yellow card) 32'; Micael (yellow card) 84'; Schons (yellow card) 88'	Report	Talisca 11' (pen.), 14', 83' (yellow card) 36'; Gaitán 19', 89'; Semedo (yellow card) 23'; Jiménez 36'; Guedes (yellow card) 87'	Stadium: Parque de Jogos Comendador Joaquim de Almeida Freitas; Attendance: 4,206; Referee: Sérgio Piscarreta (Algarve)

==== Semi-finals ====
2 May 2016 (Note: The match was originally to be played in February 2016 but was postponed because of both teams' tight schedule.)	Benfica	2–1	Braga	Lisbon
19:45 WEST (UTC+01:00)	Jonas 58'; Jiménez 71'; Sílvio (yellow card) 79'; Grimaldo (yellow card) 84'	Report	Silva 19'; Mauro (yellow card) 44'	Stadium: Estádio da Luz; Attendance: 24,933; Referee: Tiago Martins (Lisbon)

==== Final ====
20 May 2016	Marítimo	2–6	Benfica	Coimbra
19:45 WEST (UTC+01:00)	João Diogo 45+1'; Fransérgio 83' (pen.)	Report	Jonas 11'; Mitroglou 18', 38'; Gaitán 77'; Jardel 90+1'; Jiménez 90+3' (pen.)	Stadium: Estádio Cidade de Coimbra; Attendance: 28,878; Referee: Fábio Veríssimo (Leiria); Man of the Match: Nicolás Gaitán

=== UEFA Champions League ===
==== Group stage ====
Pos	Team	Pld	W	D	L	GF	GA	GD	Pts	Qualification	ATM	BEN	GAL	AST
1	(Spain) Atlético Madrid	6	4	1	1	11	3	+8	13	Advance to knockout phase	—	1–2	2–0	4–0
2	(Portugal) Benfica	6	3	1	2	10	8	+2	10	Advance to knockout phase	1–2	—	2–1	2–0
3	(Turkey) Galatasaray	6	1	2	3	6	10	−4	5	Transfer to Europa League	0–2	2–1	—	1–1
4	(Kazakhstan) Astana	6	0	4	2	5	11	−6	4		0–0	2–2	2–2	—

Source: UEFA
Rules for classification: Group stage tiebreakers

15 September 2015 1	Benfica (Portugal)	2–0	(Kazakhstan) Astana	Lisbon, Portugal
20:45 CEST (UTC+02:00)	Samaris (yellow card) 40'; Guedes (yellow card) 45+1'; Gaitán 51'; Mitroglou 62'; Jardel (yellow card) 83'	Report	Aničić (yellow card) 21'; Dzholchiyev (yellow card) 24'; Zhukov (yellow card) 78'	Stadium: Estádio da Luz; Attendance: 32,799; Referee: Anastasios Sidiropoulos (Greece)

30 September 2015 2	Atlético Madrid (Spain)	1–2	(Portugal) Benfica	Madrid, Spain
20:45 CEST (UTC+02:00)	Correa 23'; Martínez (yellow card) 39'; Óliver (yellow card) 55'	Report	Eliseu (yellow card) 25'; Luisão (yellow card) 28'; Gaitán 36'; Samaris (yellow card) 39'; Guedes 51'; Jardel (yellow card) 82'	Stadium: Vicente Calderón; Attendance: 40,938; Referee: Gianluca Rocchi (Italy)

21 October 2015 3	Galatasaray (Turkey)	2–1	(Portugal) Benfica	Istanbul, Turkey
20:45 CEST (UTC+02:00)	İnan 19' (pen.) (yellow card) 63'; Podolski 33'; Kısa (yellow card) 42'; Balta (yellow card) 70'; Yılmaz (yellow card) 90+5'	Report	Gaitán 2'; Almeida (yellow card) 18'; Samaris (yellow card) 73'; Andrade (yellow card) 78'; Luisão (yellow card) 87'	Stadium: Türk Telekom Arena; Attendance: 33,615; Referee: Willie Collum (Scotland)

3 November 2015 4	Benfica (Portugal)	2–1	(Turkey) Galatasaray	Lisbon, Portugal
20:45 CET (UTC+01:00)	Almeida (yellow card) 31'; Guedes (yellow card) 43'; Gaitán (yellow card) 44' (red card) 85'; Jonas 52'; Sílvio (yellow card) 56'; Luisão 67'	Report	Yılmaz (yellow card) 41'; İnan (yellow card) 55'; Podolski 58'; Adın (yellow card) 90+3'	Stadium: Estádio da Luz; Attendance: 35,726; Referee: Milorad Mažić (Serbia)

25 November 2015 5	Astana (Kazakhstan)	2–2	(Portugal) Benfica	Astana, Kazakhstan
16:00 CET (UTC+01:00)	Twumasi 19'; Aničić 31'; Cañas (yellow card) 50'; Shchotkin (yellow card) 90+4'	Report	Jiménez (yellow card) 23' (goal) 40', 72'; López (yellow card) 44'; Jonas (yellow card) 48'	Stadium: Astana Arena; Attendance: 15,089; Referee: Ruddy Buquet (France)

8 December 2015 6	Benfica (Portugal)	1–2	(Spain) Atlético Madrid	Lisbon, Portugal
20:45 CET (UTC+01:00)	Mitroglou 75'; Fejsa (yellow card) 77'	Report	Saúl 33' (yellow card) 70'; Vietto 55'; Godín (yellow card) 68'; Óliver (yellow card) 89'	Stadium: Estádio da Luz; Attendance: 47,630; Referee: Ovidiu Hațegan (Romania)

==== Round of 16 ====
16 February 2016 1st leg	Benfica (Portugal)	1–0	(Russia) Zenit Saint Petersburg	Lisbon, Portugal
20:45 CET (UTC+01:00)	Almeida (yellow card) 16'; Jardel (yellow card) 35'; Pizzi (yellow card) 43'; Jonas 90+1' (yellow card) 90+2'	Report	Witsel (yellow card) 32'; García (yellow card) 59'; Criscito (yellow card) 67' (yellow-red card) 90'	Stadium: Estádio da Luz; Attendance: 48,615; Referee: Gianluca Rocchi (Italy)

9 March 2016 2nd leg	Zenit Saint Petersburg (Russia)	1–2 (1–3 agg.)	(Portugal) Benfica	Saint Petersburg, Russia
18:00 CET (UTC+01:00)	Hulk 69' (yellow card) 90+5'	Report	Mitroglou (yellow card) 36'; Pizzi (yellow card) 49'; Gaitán 85'; Talisca 90+6'	Stadium: Petrovsky Stadium; Attendance: 17,688; Referee: Viktor Kassai (Hungary)

==== Quarter-finals ====
5 April 2016 1st leg	Bayern Munich (Germany)	1–0	(Portugal) Benfica	Munich, Germany
20:45 CEST (UTC+02:00)	Vidal 2'; Ribéry (yellow card) 22'; Bernat (yellow card) 42'	Report	Jonas (yellow card) 58'; Lindelöf (yellow card) 62'	Stadium: Allianz Arena; Attendance: 70,000; Referee: Szymon Marciniak (Poland)

13 April 2016 2nd leg	Benfica (Portugal)	2–2 (2–3 agg.)	(Germany) Bayern Munich	Lisbon, Portugal
20:45 CEST (UTC+02:00)	Jiménez 27'; Carcela (yellow card) 70'; Talisca 76'; Almeida (yellow card) 90+1'	Report	Vidal 38'; Müller 52'; Martínez (yellow card) 74'	Stadium: Estádio da Luz; Attendance: 63,235; Referee: Björn Kuipers (Netherlands)

== Statistics ==
=== Squad statistics ===
No.	Pos	Nat	Player	Total		Primeira Liga		Taça de Portugal^{1}		Taça da Liga		UEFA Champions League	
No.	Pos	Nat	Player	Apps	Goals	Apps	Goals	Apps	Goals	Apps	Goals	Apps	Goals
1	GK	(Brazil) BRA	Ederson	18	-12	10	-4	0	0	5	-4	3	-4
2	DF	(Argentina) ARG	Lisandro López	19	1	14	1	1	0	2	0	2	0
3	DF	(Spain) ESP	Álex Grimaldo	5	0	2	0	0	0	3	0	0	0
4	DF	(Brazil) BRA	Luisão	17	1	9	0	2	0	2	0	4	1
5	MF	(Serbia) SRB	Ljubomir Fejsa	28	0	19	0	2	0	1	0	6	0
7	MF	(Greece) GRE	Andreas Samaris	40	2	27	2	1	0	5	0	7	0
9	FW	(Mexico) MEX	Raúl Jiménez	45	12	28	5	2	0	5	4	10	3
10	MF	(Argentina) ARG	Nicolás Gaitán	37	11	25	4	2	0	2	3	8	4
11	FW	(Greece) GRE	Kostas Mitroglou	45	25	32	20	3	1	3	2	7	2
12	GK	(Brazil) BRA	Júlio César	34	-29	24	-17	3	-4	0	0	7	-8
13	GK	(Portugal) POR	Paulo Lopes	1	-1	1	-1	0	0	0	0	0	0
14	DF	(Sweden) SWE	Victor Lindelöf	23	1	15	1	0	0	4	0	4	0
15	MF	(Netherlands) NED	Ola John	3	0	2	0	1	0	0	0	0	0
17	FW	(Brazil) BRA	Jonas	48	36	34	32	2	0	3	2	9	2
18	MF	(Argentina) ARG	Eduardo Salvio	12	0	8	0	0	0	1	0	3	0
19	DF	(Portugal) POR	Eliseu	44	0	31	0	2	0	1	0	10	0
20	FW	(Portugal) POR	Gonçalo Guedes	32	4	18	3	2	0	5	0	7	1
21	MF	(Portugal) POR	Pizzi	47	8	31	8	3	0	3	0	10	0
22	MF	(Serbia) SRB	Filip Đuričić	2	0	1	0	0	0	1	0	0	0
23	MF	(Morocco) MAR	Adel Taarabt	0	0	0	0	0	0	0	0	0	0
24	MF	(Italy) ITA	Bryan Cristante	5	0	2	0	0	0	1	0	2	0
28	DF	(Portugal) POR	Sílvio	14	0	4	0	3	0	4	0	3	0
30	MF	(Brazil) BRA	Talisca	34	9	21	3	3	0	5	4	5	2
31	MF	(Brazil) BRA	Victor Andrade	5	0	3	0	1	0	0	0	1	0
33	DF	(Brazil) BRA	Jardel	44	5	30	3	3	1	2	1	9	0
34	MF	(Portugal) POR	André Almeida	37	0	26	0	1	0	2	0	8	0
35	FW	(Serbia) SRB	Luka Jović	2	0	1	0	0	0	0	0	1	0
38	MF	(Portugal) POR	Nuno Santos	2	0	1	0	1	0	0	0	0	0
39	MF	(Morocco) MAR	Mehdi Carcela	29	3	20	2	1	1	4	0	4	0
40	MF	(Portugal) POR	João Teixeira (B)	1	0	0	0	1	0	0	0	0	0
50	DF	(Portugal) POR	Nélson Semedo	18	1	12	1	1	0	2	0	3	0
61	DF	(Mozambique) MOZ	Clésio Baúque (B)	1	0	1	0	0	0	0	0	0	0
85	MF	(Portugal) POR	Renato Sanches	35	2	24	2	0	0	5	0	6	0

(B) – Benfica B player

Includes Supertaça Cândido de Oliveira

=== Goalscorers ===
Rnk	Pos	Player	League	Cup	League Cup	Champions League	Total
1	FW	(Brazil) Jonas	32	0	2	2	36
2	FW	(Greece) Kostas Mitroglou	20	1	2	2	25
3	FW	(Mexico) Raúl Jiménez	5	0	4	3	12
4	MF	(Argentina) Nicolás Gaitán	4	0	3	4	11
5	MF	(Brazil) Talisca	3	0	4	2	9
6	MF	(Portugal) Pizzi	8	0	0	0	8
7	DF	(Brazil) Jardel	3	1	1	0	5
8	FW	(Portugal) Gonçalo Guedes	3	0	0	1	4
9	MF	(Morocco) Mehdi Carcela	2	1	0	0	3
10	MF	(Portugal) Renato Sanches	2	0	0	0	2
10	MF	(Greece) Andreas Samaris	2	0	0	0	2
12	DF	(Portugal) Nélson Semedo	1	0	0	0	1
12	DF	(Brazil) Luisão	0	0	0	1	1
12	DF	(Argentina) Lisandro López	1	0	0	0	1
12	DF	(Sweden) Victor Lindelöf	1	0	0	0	1
Own goals			1	0	0	0	1
Totals			88	3	16	15	122

=== Hat-tricks ===
Player	Against	Result	Date	Competition
(Brazil) Jonas	Nacional	4–1 (A)	10 January 2016	Primeira Liga
(Brazil) Talisca	Moreirense	6–1 (A)	26 January 2016	Taça da Liga
(Greece) Mitroglou	Belenenses	5–0 (A)	5 February 2016	Primeira Liga

(H) – Home; (A) – Away

=== Assists ===
Rnk	Pos	Player	League	Cup	League Cup	Champions League	Total
1	MF	(Argentina) Nicolás Gaitán	15	0	1	3	19
2	FW	(Brazil) Jonas	12	0	2	1	15
3	MF	(Portugal) Pizzi	6	2	3	0	11
4	FW	(Portugal) Gonçalo Guedes	5	0	1	0	6
4	MF	(Morocco) Mehdi Carcela	5	0	1	0	6
6	FW	(Mexico) Raúl Jiménez	1	0	0	3	4
6	DF	(Portugal) André Almeida	3	0	0	1	4
8	FW	(Greece) Kostas Mitroglou	2	0	0	1	3
8	DF	(Portugal) Eliseu	1	0	0	2	3
10	DF	(Brazil) Jardel	2	0	0	0	2
11	MF	(Brazil) Victor Andrade	1	0	0	0	1
11	MF	(Greece) Andreas Samaris	1	0	0	0	1
11	DF	(Brazil) Luisão	0	0	0	1	1
11	DF	(Argentina) Lisandro López	1	0	0	0	1
11	MF	(Brazil) Talisca	0	0	1	0	1
11	DF	(Portugal) Nélson Semedo	0	0	1	0	1
11	MF	(Portugal) Renato Sanches	1	0	0	0	1
Totals			56	2	10	12	80

=== Clean sheets ===
Number of matches inside brackets.

Rnk	Player	League	Cup^{1}	League Cup	Champions League	Total
1	(Brazil) Júlio César	12 (24)	0 (3)	—	2 (7)	14 (34)
2	(Brazil) Ederson	6 (10)	—	2 (5)	0 (3)	8 (18)
3	(Portugal) Paulo Lopes	0*	—	—	—	0*
Totals		17 (34)	0 (3)	2 (5)	2 (10)	22 (52)

^{1}Includes Supertaça Cândido de Oliveira

* Shared match on Round 34 against Marítimo.

=== Disciplinary record ===
N	P	Nat.	Name	League			Cup			League Cup			Champions League			Total			Notes
N	P	Nat.	Name	Yellow card	Second yellow card	Red card	Yellow card	Second yellow card	Red card	Yellow card	Second yellow card	Red card	Yellow card	Second yellow card	Red card	Yellow card	Second yellow card	Red card	Notes
1	GK	(Brazil)	Ederson	2					1							2		1	
7	MF	(Greece)	Andreas Samaris	7				1		1			3			11	1		
34	MF	(Portugal)	André Almeida	4	1		1						4			9	1		
85	MF	(Portugal)	Renato Sanches	5	1					1						6	1		
10	MF	(Argentina)	Nicolás Gaitán	2			1							1		3	1		Cup includes Super Cup
33	DF	(Brazil)	Jardel	8			1						3			12			
19	DF	(Portugal)	Eliseu	9						1			1			11			
17	FW	(Brazil)	Jonas	4			1						4			9			Cup includes Super Cup
5	MF	(Serbia)	Ljubomir Fejsa	4			1						2			7			Cup includes Super Cup
11	FW	(Greece)	Kostas Mitroglou	5									1			6			
28	DF	(Portugal)	Sílvio	1			1			2			2			6			Cup includes Super Cup
2	DF	(Argentina)	Lisandro López	3						1			1			5			
4	DF	(Brazil)	Luisão	3									2			5			
14	DF	(Sweden)	Victor Lindelöf	3						1			1			5			
21	MF	(Portugal)	Pizzi	3									2			5			
30	MF	(Brazil)	Talisca	2						1			1			4			
9	FW	(Mexico)	Raúl Jiménez	2									1			3			
20	FW	(Portugal)	Gonçalo Guedes							1			2			3			
34	DF	(Portugal)	Nélson Semedo	2						1						3			
31	MF	(Brazil)	Victor Andrade	1									1			2			
39	MF	(Morocco)	Mehdi Carcela	1									1			2			
3	DF	(Spain)	Álex Grimaldo							1						1			
12	GK	(Brazil)	Júlio César	1												1			
38	MF	(Portugal)	Nuno Santos				1									1			

Source: LPFP and competitions above.
Ordered by (red card) , (second yellow card) and (yellow card)
(yellow card) = Number of bookings; (second yellow card) = Number of sending offs after a second yellow card; (red card) = Number of sending offs by a direct red card.

== Awards ==
=== Player ===
No.	Pos	Name	Award	Month/Year	Ref
85	MF	(Portugal) Renato Sanches	SJPF Young Player of the Month	December	
85	MF	(Portugal) Renato Sanches	Cosme Damião Award – Revelation of the Year	2015	
85	MF	(Portugal) Renato Sanches	CNID Revelation of the Year	—	
85	MF	(Portugal) Renato Sanches	LPFP Primeira Liga Breakthrough Player	—	
85	MF	(Portugal) Renato Sanches	LPFP Primeira Liga Best Goal	—	
17	FW	(Brazil) Jonas	SJPF Player of the Month	January	
17	FW	(Brazil) Jonas	SJPF Player of the Month	February	
17	FW	(Brazil) Jonas	SJPF Player of the Month	March	
17	FW	(Brazil) Jonas	Cosme Damião Award – Footballer of the Year	2015	
17	FW	(Brazil) Jonas	CNID Footballer of the Year	—	
17	FW	(Brazil) Jonas	Bola de Prata	—	
17	FW	(Brazil) Jonas	LPFP Primeira Liga Best Player	—	

=== Manager ===
Name	Award	Month	Ref
(Portugal) Rui Vitória	LPFP Primeira Liga Best Coach	—	
