= Lucas Mineiro =

Lucas Mineiro may refer to:

- Lucas Mineiro (footballer, born 1992), Lucas Alberto Pereira da Silva, Brazilian football midfielder
- Lucas Mineiro (footballer, born 1996), Lucas da Silva Izidoro, Brazilian football midfielder
