= Mohamed Coulibaly =

Mohamed Coulibaly may refer to:

- Mohamed Coulibaly (footballer, born 1988), Senegalese footballer
- Mohamed Coulibaly (swimmer) (born 1989), Malian swimmer
- Mohamed Coulibaly (footballer, born 1994), Ivorian footballer
