= 2022–23 U.D. Vilafranquense season =

U.D. Vilafranquense
2022–23 season
- Chairman: Elias Barquete Albarrello
- Manager: Filipe Gouveia
- Stadium: Campo do Cevadeiro
- Liga Portugal 2: 5th
- Taça de Portugal: Third round
- Taça da Liga: Group stage
- Top goalscorer: League: Nenê (7); All: Nenê (8)
- Biggest win: Trofense 1–3 Vilafranquense
- Biggest defeat: Moreirense 3–0 Vilafranquense
Home colours	Away colours
- All statistics correct as of 8 January 2023.

The 2022–23 season is the 66th season in the history of U.D. Vilafranquense and their fourth consecutive season in the second division of Portuguese football. The club are participating in the Liga Portugal 2, the Taça de Portugal, and the Taça da Liga. The season covers the period from 1 July 2022 to 30 June 2023.

== Players ==
As of 6 January 2023

Note: Flags indicate national team as defined under FIFA eligibility rules; some limited exceptions apply. Players may hold more than one non-FIFA nationality.

No.	Pos.	Nation	Player
2	DF	POR	Bruno Sousa
3	DF	BRA	Thiago Freitas
5	DF	ESP	Kike Hermoso
6	MF	POR	André Ceitil
7	MF	POR	Luís Silva
8	MF	POR	Bernardo Martins
9	FW	CIV	Balla Sangaré
10	MF	FRA	Idrissa Dioh
11	FW	ALG	Mouhamed Belkheir
12	DF	BRA	Edson Paraíba
13	DF	BRA	Gabriel Pereira
15	MF	POR	João Amorim
16	DF	ENG	Easah Suliman (on loan from Vitória de Guimarães)
17	FW	POR	Umaro Baldé
18	FW	BRA	Nenê

No.	Pos.	Nation	Player
21	FW	POR	Edson Mucuana
22	DF	BRA	Léo Alaba
23	DF	LUX	Eric Veiga
25	MF	POR	Ricardo Dias
26	MF	POR	André Sousa
27	FW	FRA	Nathan Bizet
28	DF	POR	Sílvio
32	GK	BRA	Lucas Moura
37	FW	POR	Idrisa Sambú
41	DF	FRA	Anthony Correia
72	GK	POR	Fanã
77	FW	POR	Leandro Tipote
88	GK	POR	Pedro Trigueira
98	GK	POR	Fábio Duarte
—	MF	POR	Júnior Franco

=== Other players under contract ===
Note: Flags indicate national team as defined under FIFA eligibility rules; some limited exceptions apply. Players may hold more than one non-FIFA nationality.

No.	Pos.	Nation	Player
—	MF	POR	Gonçalo

== Pre-season and friendlies ==
Win Draw Loss Fixtures

27 July 2022 Friendly	Mafra (Portugal)	1–0	(Portugal) Vilafranquense	TBD
10:00 WEST (UTC+1)

== Competitions ==
=== Overall record ===
Competition	First match	Last match	Starting round	Final position	Record							
Competition	First match	Last match	Starting round	Final position	Pld	W	D	L	GF	GA	GD	Win %
Liga Portugal 2	7 August 2022	May 2023	Matchday 1		15	6	5	4	19	17	+2	40.00
Taça de Portugal	2 October 2022	14 October 2022	Second round	Third round	2	1	0	1	3	5	−2	50.00
Taça da Liga	19 November 2022	11 December 2022	Group stage	Group stage	3	0	2	1	0	1	−1	0.00
Total					20	7	7	6	22	23	−1	35.00

Last updated: 8 January 2023
Source: Soccerway

=== Liga Portugal 2 ===
==== League table ====
Pos	Team	Pld	W	D	L	GF	GA	GD	Pts
5	Porto B (I)	34	14	9	11	48	40	+8	51
6	Mafra	34	12	11	11	46	49	−3	47
7	Vilafranquense	34	12	10	12	42	36	+6	46 (Note: Vilafranquense are ahead of Feirense on head-to-head points: Vilafranquense 1–0 Feirense, Feirense 1–2 Vilafranquense.)
8	Feirense	34	11	13	10	43	37	+6	46
9	Torreense	34	13	5	16	38	41	−3	44

Updated to match(es) played on 28 May 2023. Source: Liga Portugal 2
Rules for classification: 1) Points; 2) Head-to-head points; 3) Head-to-head goal difference; 4) Head-to-head away goals scored; 5) Goal difference; 6) Matches won; 7) Goals scored; 8) Play-off.
(I) Ineligible for promotion

==== Results summary ====
Overall								Home						Away					
Pld	W	D	L	GF	GA	GD	Pts	W	D	L	GF	GA	GD	W	D	L	GF	GA	GD
0	0	0	0	0	0	0	0	0	0	0	0	0	0	0	0	0	0	0	0

Last updated: August 2022.
Source: Liga Portugal

==== Results by round ====
Round	1
Ground	
Result	
Position	

Updated to match(es) played on August 2022. Source: Liga Portugal
A = Away; H = Home; W = Win; D = Draw; L = Loss

==== Matches ====
The league fixtures were announced on 5 July 2022.
