= Bizet (disambiguation) =

Georges Bizet (1838–1875), a French classical composer and pianist.

Bizet may also refer to:

== People ==
- Celin Bizet Ildhusøy (born 2001), Norwegian footballer
- Jean Bizet (born 1947), French politician
- Marie Bizet (1905–1998), French actress and singer
- Nathan Bizet (born 1997), French footballer

== Places ==
- Bizet, Enticho, a town in Tigray
- Le Bizet, a village in Ploegsteert, Belgium

== Other ==
- Bizet (sheep), a breed of sheep
- Bizet metro station, on the Brussels metro
