= Inters Gui =

Ivorian footballer

Inters Gui "le Vieux Capable"
Personal information
- Full name: Inters Auxence Gui
- Date of birth: 8 August 1992 (age 34)
- Place of birth: Bingerville, Ivory Coast
- Height: 1.73 m (5 ft 8 in)
- Position: Winger

Team information
- Current team: Newroz
- Number: 81

Senior career*
Years	Team	Apps	(Gls)
2010−2014	Sporting Covilhã	70	(4)
2014−2017	Vitória Guimarães	13	(0)
2014−2016	→ Vitória Guimarães B	29	(3)
2016	→ Académica (loan)	6	(0)
2016–2017	→ Chiasso (loan)	14	(5)
2017–2018	Samtredia	35	(10)
2019	Saburtalo	21	(2)
2020–2021	Sporting Covilhã	18	(0)
2021	Torreense	7	(1)
2021–2022	Sliema Wanderers	20	(0)
2022–2024	Al-Nahda	11	(2)
2024	Al-Nahda	1	(1)
2024–2025	Newroz	6	(0)
2025-	Safa SC	5	(0)
- * Club domestic league appearances and goals as of 25 May 2025 @ 05:05AM(AEST)

Inters Gui (born 8 August 1992) is an Ivorian footballer who plays as a winger for Iraq Stars League club Newroz.

== Career ==
Après 4 ans au Sporting Covilhã, totalisant 70 apparitions, en juillet 2014, Gui rejoint Vitória Guimarães. Le 12 juillet 2023, Gui a rejoint Tuwaiq, équipe de la deuxième division saoudienne. Le 14 janvier 2024, Gui est retourné à Al-Nahda.

On 12 July 2023, Gui joined Saudi Second Division side Tuwaiq.

On 14 January 2024, Gui returned to Al-Nahda.
