= João Pica =

Portuguese footballer (born 1986)

Personal information
- Full name: João Miguel Passos Manuel Pica
- Date of birth: 8 April 1986 (age 40)
- Place of birth: Moura, Portugal
- Height: 1.85 m (6 ft 1 in)
- Position: Centre-back

Youth career
- 1995–2003: Moura
- 2003–2004: Desportivo Beja
- 2004–2005: Vitória Setúbal

Senior career*
| Years | Team | Apps | (Gls) |
| 2005–2007 | Vitória Setúbal B | 3 | (0) |
| 2007 | Elvas | | |
| 2008–2009 | Ribeirão | 43 | (1) |
| 2009–2010 | Varzim | 21 | (1) |
| 2011–2012 | Moreirense | 16 | (1) |
| 2011–2012 | → Tondela (loan) | 26 | (2) |
| 2012–2017 | Tondela | 103 | (6) |
| 2017–2022 | Académico Viseu | 81 | (2) |
| 2022–2024 | Castro Daire | 44 | (3) |
| Total | | 337 | (16) |
- * Club domestic league appearances and goals

João Miguel Passos Manuel Pica (born 8 April 1986) is a Portuguese former professional footballer who played as a central defender.

== Club career ==
Pica was born in Moura, Alentejo. Until the age of 23, he alternated between the third and fourth divisions of Portuguese football, representing Vitória de Setúbal B, O Elvas C.A.D. and G.D. Ribeirão.

In the summer of 2009, Pica signed for Segunda Liga club Varzim S.C. and, on 8 August, made his professional debut in a 1–0 home win against C.D. Fátima in the first round of the Taça da Liga. In January 2011, he moved to Moreirense F.C. in the same league.

In June 2012, after spending one season with C.D. Tondela in division three on loan, Pica agreed to a permanent deal after helping to promotion to the second tier. In the 2014–15 campaign, he contributed 19 games and one goal as his team reached the Primeira Liga for the first time in their history and, subsequently, renewed his expiring contract for a further year.

Pica played his first match in the top flight on 20 December 2015, featuring the full 90 minutes in a 1–3 home loss to Vitória de Setúbal. Initially fourth or fifth-choice stopper, he was ever-present in the season's final stretch, scoring three goals in seven games as Tondela avoided relegation in the last matchday.

On 27 June 2017, Pica joined Académico de Viseu F.C. of the second division.
