= Pedro Trigueira =

Portuguese footballer

Personal information
- Full name: Pedro José da Silva Trigueira
- Date of birth: 4 January 1988 (age 38)
- Place of birth: Baltar, Portugal
- Height: 1.92 m (6 ft 4 in)
- Position: Goalkeeper

Youth career
- 2000–2004: Paredes
- 2004–2005: Boavista
- 2005–2006: Infesta
- 2006–2007: Boavista

Senior career*
Years	Team	Apps	(Gls)
2007–2009	Boavista	8	(0)
2007–2008	→ Ribeirão (loan)	17	(0)
2009–2012	Rio Ave	1	(0)
2011–2012	→ Trofense (loan)	13	(0)
2012–2013	Cinfães	29	(0)
2013–2015	União Madeira	72	(0)
2015–2016	Académica	33	(0)
2016–2018	Vitória Setúbal	17	(0)
2018–2020	Moreirense	9	(0)
2020–2022	Tondela	46	(0)
2022–2023	Vilafranquense	31	(0)
2023–2026	AVS	31	(0)

International career
2008	Portugal U20	5	(0)
2009	Portugal U21	4	(0)
- * Club domestic league appearances and goals as of 16:48, 14 June 2026 (UTC)

Pedro José da Silva Trigueira (born 4 January 1988) is a Portuguese professional footballer who plays as a goalkeeper.

== Club career ==
Trigueira was born in Baltar, Paredes. A product of Porto-based Boavista FC's youth ranks, he was promoted to the first team in 2007, serving a loan at modest G.D. Ribeirão to gain more experience. His professional debut was made in the 2008–09 season, playing eight matches in the Segunda Liga as the former club was relegated for the second consecutive year.

Following Boavista's misfortunes, Trigueira signed in summer 2009 with Primeira Liga team Rio Ave FC, but was only third choice in his first year, behind experienced Carlos and Miguel Mora. More of the same in the 2010–11 campaign, as he appeared in only one league game (one minute against S.C. Olhanense in the last round) and added a further seven bench appearances.

From 2011 to 2015, Trigueira alternated between the second and third tiers of Portuguese football, representing C.D. Trofense, C.D. Cinfães and C.F. União. On 11 June 2015, after helping the latter to return to the top flight for the first time in 21 years, he joined Académica de Coimbra.

On 12 July 2016, after suffering top-division relegation, Trigueira signed a two-year deal with Vitória FC. In June 2018, he agreed to a contract of the same duration at Moreirense FC.

Trigueira moved to C.D. Tondela on 17 August 2020 on a two-year contract, as a replacement for FC Porto-bound Cláudio Ramos.

== International career ==
Trigueira won the first of his four caps for the Portugal under-21 team on 10 February 2009, coming on as a late substitute in the 3–1 friendly win over Switzerland.

== Career statistics ==
As of match played 16 May 2026

Appearances and goals by club, season and competition
Club	Season	League			Taça de Portugal		Taça da Liga		Other		Total	
Club	Season	Division	Apps	Goals	Apps	Goals	Apps	Goals	Apps	Goals	Apps	Goals
Boavista	2007–08	Primeira Liga	0	0	0	0	0	0	—		0	0
Boavista	2008–09	Liga de Honra	8	0	2	0	0	0	—		10	0
Boavista	Total		8	0	2	0	0	0	—		10	0
Ribeirão (loan)	2007–08	Segunda Divisão	17	0	0	0	—		—		17	0
Rio Ave	2009–10	Primeira Liga	0	0	1	0	0	0	—		1	0
Rio Ave	2010–11	Primeira Liga	1	0	1	0	0	0	—		2	0
Rio Ave	Total		1	0	2	0	0	0	—		3	0
Trofense (loan)	2011–12	Liga de Honra	13	0	1	0	0	0	—		14	0
Cinfães	2012–13	Segunda Divisão	29	0	1	0	—		—		30	0
União Madeira	2013–14	Segunda Liga	37	0	0	0	2	0	—		39	0
União Madeira	2014–15	Segunda Liga	35	0	0	0	2	0	—		37	0
União Madeira	Total		72	0	0	0	4	0	—		76	0
Académica	2015–16	Primeira Liga	33	0	0	0	0	0	—		33	0
Vitória Setúbal	2016–17	Primeira Liga	6	0	3	0	4	0	—		13	0
Vitória Setúbal	2017–18	Primeira Liga	11	0	0	0	5	0	—		16	0
Vitória Setúbal	Total		17	0	3	0	9	0	—		29	0
Moreirense	2018–19	Primeira Liga	8	0	3	0	0	0	—		11	0
Moreirense	2019–20	Primeira Liga	1	0	2	0	0	0	—		3	0
Moreirense	Total		9	0	5	0	0	0	—		14	0
Tondela	2020–21	Primeira Liga	17	0	1	0	0	0	—		18	0
Tondela	2021–22	Primeira Liga	29	0	0	0	1	0	—		30	0
Tondela	Total		46	0	1	0	1	0	—		48	0
Vilafranquense	2022–23	Liga Portugal 2	31	0	0	0	3	0	—		34	0
AVS	2023–24	Liga Portugal 2	30	0	0	0	3	0	—		33	0
AVS	2024–25	Primeira Liga	0	0	1	0	—		—		1	0
AVS	2025–26	Primeira Liga	1	0	0	0	—		—		1	0
AVS	Total		31	0	1	0	3	0	—		35	0
Career total			307	0	16	0	20	0	0	0	343	0

== Honours ==
Individual

- Liga Portugal 2 Goalkeeper of the Month: August 2023, September 2023, December 2023
