= Rafael Amorim =

Brazilian footballer (born 1987)

Personal information
- Full name: Rafael Leme Amorim
- Date of birth: 30 July 1987 (age 39)
- Place of birth: São Paulo, Brasil
- Height: 1.94 m (6 ft 4 1/2 in)
- Position: Centre-back

Senior career*
Years	Team	Apps	(Gls)
2009−2011	Marítimo B	34	(1)
2011−2012	→ Desportivo de Aves (loan)	1	(0)
2013−2014	Desportivo de Aves	15	(1)
2014−2015	Paços de Ferreira	20	(1)
2015	Mesaimeer	0	(0)
2016	Belenenses	7	(0)
2016−2018	Tondela	17	(0)
2018–2019	Cova da Piedade	18	(0)
2020	Xylotymbou	11	(0)
- * Club domestic league appearances and goals as of 12 December 2020

Rafael Leme Amorim (born 30 July 1987) is a Brazilian professional football player who plays as a centre-back.

== Career ==
Born in São Paulo, Amorim is arrived in Portugal in 2009, joining the reserve side of C.S. Marítimo, then competing in the third tier.

Two seasons later, he went on loan to Desportivo de Aves and made his professional debut at 2 October 2011, in a home win against Arouca. eventually becoming an undisputed starter, when he signed as permanent player for the Aves-side.

On 17 January 2014, Amorim moved to Paços de Ferreira, becoming a constant challenger for the starting line-up, but suffering an injury plagued season in 2014-15. On 3 June 2015, he moved to Qatar, joining Mesaimeer. However, just six-months later, he returned to Portugal to play for Belenenses. After another six-months, he traded clubs again and signed with Tondela.
