= Aníbal Capela =

Portuguese footballer

Personal information
- Full name: Aníbal Araújo Capela
- Date of birth: 8 May 1991 (age 35)
- Place of birth: Vila Verde, Portugal
- Height: 1.88 m (6 ft 2 in)
- Position: Centre-back

Youth career
- 2002–2010: Braga

Senior career*
Years	Team	Apps	(Gls)
2010–2015	Braga	1	(0)
2010–2011	→ Vizela (loan)	10	(0)
2011–2012	→ Covilhã (loan)	22	(0)
2012–2013	Braga B	15	(1)
2013	→ Moreirense (loan)	14	(2)
2013–2015	→ Académica (loan)	33	(0)
2015–2017	Rio Ave	11	(0)
2017–2018	Carpi	17	(0)
2018–2020	Cosenza	53	(0)
2020–2022	Triestina	37	(1)

International career
2009	Portugal U18	3	(0)
2009–2010	Portugal U19	9	(0)
2010–2011	Portugal U20	3	(0)
2012	Portugal U21	1	(0)
- * Club domestic league appearances and goals as of 13 September 2022

Aníbal Araújo Capela (born 8 May 1991) is a Portuguese professional footballer who plays as a central defender.
