= Mohamed Coulibaly (footballer, born 1994) =

Ivorian footballer

Personal information
- Date of birth: 17 May 1994 (age 32)
- Place of birth: Koun-Fao, Ivory Coast
- Height: 1.73 m (5 ft 8 in)
- Position: Midfielder

Team information
- Current team: Torre de Moncorvo
- Number: 13

Youth career
- 2012–2013: União de Coimbra

Senior career*
Years	Team	Apps	(Gls)
2013–2014	Naval	17	(0)
2014	Vilaverdense	3	(0)
2014–2015	Mirandela	30	(0)
2015	Vianense	9	(0)
2016	Farense	7	(1)
2016	Zimbru Chișinău	0	(0)
2016–2017	Almancilense	23	(1)
2017–2018	Bragança	22	(0)
2018–2019	Sanjoanense	31	(1)
2019–2020	Loures	16	(0)
2020–2022	Alcains	46	(3)
2022–2023	Ferreira de Aves	25	(1)
2023	Távora	4	(0)
2023–	Torre de Moncorvo	1	(0)
- * Club domestic league appearances and goals as of 15:33, 10 November 2023 (UTC)

Mohamed Coulibaly (born 17 May 1994), also known as Momo Coulibaly, is an Ivorian professional footballer who plays as a midfielder for Portuguese club Torre de Moncorvo.
