= Rabiola =

Portuguese footballer (born 1989)

Personal information
- Full name: Tiago André Coelho Lopes
- Date of birth: 25 July 1989 (age 37)
- Place of birth: Guimarães, Portugal
- Height: 1.82 m (5 ft 11 1/2 in)
- Position: Forward

Youth career
- 1999–2002: Vitória Guimarães
- 2002–2003: Brito
- 2003–2006: Vitória Guimarães

Senior career*
Years	Team	Apps	(Gls)
2006–2007	Vitória Guimarães	5	(1)
2007–2011	Porto	2	(0)
2007–2008	→ Vitória Guimarães (loan)	4	(1)
2009–2010	→ Olhanense (loan)	25	(3)
2010–2011	→ Aves (loan)	14	(8)
2011–2012	Feirense	9	(1)
2012–2013	Aves	24	(14)
2013–2014	Braga	0	(0)
2013–2014	Braga B	13	(3)
2013–2014	→ Piast Gliwice (loan)	16	(0)
2014–2015	Penafiel	26	(6)
2015–2016	Académica	23	(2)
2016–2018	Paços Ferreira	0	(0)
2018–2020	Felgueiras 1932	41	(26)
2020	Vizela	3	(0)
2020–2021	Fafe	19	(1)
2021–2022	Vila Meã	22	(6)
Total		246	(72)

International career
2006–2007	Portugal U18	9	(3)
2007–2008	Portugal U19	11	(3)
2009–2010	Portugal U21	6	(0)
- * Club domestic league appearances and goals

Tiago André Coelho Lopes (born 25 July 1989), known as Rabiola, is a Portuguese former professional footballer who played as a forward.

== Club career ==
Rabiola was born in Guimarães. A product of Vitória de Guimarães' youth system, he made his professional debut in the 2006–07 season, helping the club to return to the Primeira Liga with five games and one goal, which came in a 6–0 home rout of Portimonense S.C. on 6 May 2007.

Subsequently bought by FC Porto on a three-year contract, with an option for another two, Rabiola spent the first half of the 2007–08 campaign on loan to Vitória. He was rarely featured again, taking part in four matches for the eventual third-placed team and adding a goal as a late substitute against U.D. Leiria.

Rabiola returned to Porto in January 2008. He waited 15 months to make his first league appearance for them, however, playing one minute in the 2–0 home win over Vitória de Setúbal after having replaced Lisandro López.

Rabiola was loaned again for 2009–10, now to S.C. Olhanense which had just returned to the main division. He alternated between the first and the second tiers the following years, representing C.D. Aves (two spells), C.D. Feirense (where he seriously injured his knee) and S.C. Braga (originally signed to a four-and-a-half-year deal, he only appeared for the reserves during his spell).

On 8 June 2015, after suffering top-flight relegation with F.C. Penafiel, Rabiola moved to Académica de Coimbra on a two-year contract. He scored only twice in his only season as his side met the same fate and, the following summer, he joined F.C. Paços de Ferreira in the same league, but missed the entire campaign due to an anterior cruciate ligament injury and subsequently was not re-signed.

Having not played a match for over two years, Rabiola dropped into the third tier for the first time in July 2018, signing for F.C. Felgueiras 1932. He scored 15 goals from 25 appearances in his first season, including a hat-trick the following 17 March in the first half-hour of a 5–1 home defeat of A.D. Os Limianos.

On 20 January 2020, as leading scorer in Felgueiras' group, Rabiola transferred to F.C. Vizela, leaders of another group. On 8 June, he joined AD Fafe for the upcoming season.

== International career ==
Rabiola won 26 caps for Portugal in three youth age groups and scored six goals. He made his debut for the under-21s on 4 June 2009, playing 33 minutes after replacing Braga's Yazalde in a 1–0 loss against Chile in that year's Toulon Tournament.

== Career statistics ==
As of 30 December 2012

Club	Season	League		Cup		League Cup		Europe		Total	
Club	Season	Apps	Goals	Apps	Goals	Apps	Goals	Apps	Goals	Apps	Goals
Vitória Guimarães	2006–07	5	1	0	0	0	0	0	0	5	1
Porto	2007–08	0	0	1	0	0	0	0	0	1	0
Vitória Guimarães	2007–08	4	1	1	0	0	0	0	0	5	1
Porto	2008–09	2	0	1	0	2	1	0	0	5	1
Olhanense	2009–10	25	3	0	0	1	0	0	0	26	3
Aves	2010–11	14	8	1	0	6	1	0	0	21	9
Feirense	2011–12	9	1	1	0	0	0	0	0	10	1
Aves	2012–13	19	12	2	1	4	5	0	0	25	18
Career totals		78	26	7	1	13	7	0	0	98	34

== Honours ==
Porto

- Primeira Liga: 2008–09
- Taça de Portugal: 2008–09
