= Nathan Bizet =

French footballer (born 1997)

Personal information
- Date of birth: 27 April 1997 (age 29)
- Place of birth: Paris, France
- Height: 1.91 m (6 ft 3 in)
- Position: Forward

Team information
- Current team: Vilafranquense
- Number: 27

Youth career
- Dijon

Senior career*
| Years | Team | Apps | (Gls) |
| 2014–2017 | Dijon B | 28 | (2) |
| 2015–2017 | Dijon | 1 | (0) |
| 2017–2019 | Auxerre B | 44 | (22) |
| 2017–2019 | Auxerre | 7 | (0) |
| 2019–2020 | Dunkerque | 25 | (4) |
| 2020–2021 | Red Star | 23 | (5) |
| 2021– | Vilafranquense | 14 | (2) |
- * Club domestic league appearances and goals as of 26 June 2023

Nathan Bizet (born 27 April 1997) is a French professional footballer who plays for Portuguese club U.D. Vilafranquense as a forward.

== Career ==
Bizet started his career with Dijon FCO, playing four years with the reserve team and making his Ligue 2 debut in a 0–0 draw with Red Star on 18 December 2015. He moved to AJ Auxerre in 2017, and after a year with the reserve side, signed his first professional contract with the club. In June 2019 he moved to Championnat National side USL Dunkerque. In June 2020 he joined Red Star F.C.
