= Nii Plange =

Burkinabé professional footballer (born 1989)

Personal information
- Full name: Nii Adamah Plange
- Date of birth: 26 June 1989 (age 37)
- Place of birth: Accra, Ghana
- Height: 1.75 m (5 ft 9 in)
- Position: Winger

Youth career
- Feyenoord Ghana

Senior career*
Years	Team	Apps	(Gls)
2006–2010	Feyenoord Ghana		
2008–2009	→ ASEC Mimosas (loan)		
2009–2010	ASFA Yennenga		
2010–2012	Feyenoord Ghana		
2012–2013	Sporting B	28	(4)
2013	Sporting CP	1	(0)
2013–2015	Vitória Guimarães	33	(1)
2015	Vitória Guimarães B	2	(0)
2015–2017	Académica	51	(3)
2017–2018	Nacional	4	(0)
2018–2019	Pinhalnovense	10	(2)
2019	Cesarense	3	(0)

International career^{‡}
2011–2014	Burkina Faso	3	(0)
- * Club domestic league appearances and goals as of 24 February 2019 ‡ National team caps and goals as of 5 March 2014

Nii Adamah Plange (born 26 June 1989) is a professional footballer who plays mainly as a right winger. Born in Ghana, he plays for the Burkina Faso national team.

== Club career ==
Born in Accra, Ghana, Plange began his career with local Feyenoord, moving to ASEC Mimosas on loan in July 2009. In the summer of 2012, following another spell with Feyenoord Ghana, he moved to Portugal and joined Sporting CP, initially being assigned to the reserves in the second division. He made his Primeira Liga debut on the last day of the season, playing one minute in a 4–1 away win against S.C. Beira-Mar.

On the last day of the summer transfer window of 2013, Plange moved to fellow league club Vitória de Guimarães. He played his first competitive game for his new team on 14 September, coming on as a 58th-minute substitute in a 1–0 success at Rio Ave FC. he scored his first goal in the Portuguese top level the following 8 February, but in 2–3 away loss to Vitória de Setúbal.

Plange signed a two-year deal with Académica de Coimbra (also in the Portuguese top flight) on 16 July 2015.

== International career ==
Plange made his international debut for Burkina Faso on 10 August 2011, in a friendly game against South Africa. He was selected by manager Paulo Duarte as he possessed dual nationality due to being married to a Burkinabé woman.
