= Fernando Alexandre (footballer) =

Portuguese footballer

Personal information
- Full name: Fernando José Ribeiro Alexandre
- Date of birth: 2 August 1985 (age 41)
- Place of birth: Lourinhã, Portugal
- Height: 1.82 m (6 ft 0 in)
- Position: Defensive midfielder

Youth career
- 1995–1997: Lourinhanense
- 1997–1998: Benfica
- 1998–2000: Lourinhanense
- 2000–2004: Benfica

Senior career*
Years	Team	Apps	(Gls)
2004–2006	Benfica B	27	(1)
2006–2007	Benfica	0	(0)
2006–2007	→ Olivais Moscavide (loan)	4	(1)
2007–2008	Mafra	34	(7)
2008–2009	Estrela Amadora	29	(0)
2009–2012	Braga	1	(0)
2009–2010	→ Leixões (loan)	22	(0)
2010–2012	→ Olhanense (loan)	49	(0)
2012–2013	Olhanense	22	(1)
2013–2020	Académica	113	(7)
2017	→ Moreirense (loan)	6	(0)
Total		307	(17)

International career
2001–2002	Portugal U17	10	(0)
2002–2003	Portugal U18	4	(0)
2003–2004	Portugal U19	9	(0)
2004–2006	Portugal U20	8	(2)
- * Club domestic league appearances and goals

Fernando José Ribeiro Alexandre (born 2 August 1985) is a Portuguese former professional footballer who played mainly as a defensive midfielder.

== Club career ==
Born in Lourinhã, Lisbon District, Alexandre started his professional career with S.L. Benfica, but could never make any official appearances for the first team. From 2004 to 2006 he played with the club's reserves (soon to be extinct) and in the Segunda Liga, with Lisbon neighbours C.D. Olivais e Moscavide.

After one season in the third tier with C.D. Mafra – also in the region – Alexandre moved to C.F. Estrela da Amadora, again in the capital but now in the Primeira Liga. He was an essential figure in midfield, as the side finished in a comfortable mid-table position in spite of serious financial difficulties.

In late June 2009, after Estrela were relegated off-court, Alexandre moved to S.C. Braga on a free transfer and a four-year contract. He still participated in one league match with the Minho team, playing 25 minutes in a 2–1 away win against Sporting CP but, just hours before the August transfer window closed, was sent on loan to Leixões S.C. also of the top flight, remaining on loan the following two years but with S.C. Olhanense.

On 4 July 2013, Académica de Coimbra completed the signing of Alexandre, with the free agent penning a one-year contract and reuniting with his former Olhanense manager Sérgio Conceição. He was regularly used in the next top-division campaigns, scoring three goals from 27 games in 2015–16 but being relegated.

During the 2017 January transfer window, Alexandre was loaned to Moreirense FC.

== Honours ==
Moreirense

- Taça da Liga: 2016–17
