= Nuno Piloto =

Portuguese footballer (born 1982)

Personal information
- Full name: Nuno Miguel Torres Piloto de Albuquerque
- Date of birth: 19 March 1982 (age 44)
- Place of birth: Tondela, Portugal
- Height: 1.77 m (5 ft 9 1/2 in)
- Position: Midfielder

Team information
- Current team: Anderlecht (assistant)

Youth career
- 1994–2000: Repesenses
- 2000–2001: Académica

Senior career*
Years	Team	Apps	(Gls)
2001–2004	Académica B	67	(14)
2001–2002	→ Anadia (loan)	26	(4)
2003–2009	Académica	90	(2)
2006–2007	→ Tourizense (loan)	2	(0)
2009–2010	Iraklis	0	(0)
2010–2013	Olhanense	41	(3)
2013–2017	Académica	77	(1)
Total		303	(24)

Managerial career
- 2018–2019: Académica (youth)
- * Club domestic league appearances and goals

Nuno Miguel Torres Piloto de Albuquerque (born 19 March 1982), known as Piloto, is a Portuguese former professional footballer who played as a central midfielder. He is currently the assistant manager of Belgian Pro League club Anderlecht.

He totalled 173 appearances and six goals in the Primeira Liga over 12 seasons, with Académica (nine years) and Olhanense (three).

== Playing career ==
Born in Tondela, Viseu District, Piloto was brought up in the youth system of Académica de Coimbra. His first season as a senior would be spent with semi-professional Anadia FC, in 2001–02, after which he played two years with Académica's reserves in the third division; his debut with the first team arrived late into 2002–03.

Piloto was used irregularly in his first years with the main squad (six Primeira Liga appearances, then 25 and nine), definitely becoming an important part in 2007–08 and scoring his first league goals the following campaign in home matches against C.D. Nacional (1–1) and C.F. Os Belenenses (1–0). By this time, he was already team captain.

In June 2009, having rejected offers for a new deal, Piloto moved abroad and signed a three-year contract with Iraklis from Greece. At the end of July, during pre-season training, he suffered a tear in the ligaments of his left knee following a strong challenge by Matías Lequi, being sidelined for six months; the surgery took place in his country, being performed by FC Porto's medical staff.

After failing to make a single appearance, Piloto returned to Portugal and signed a two-year deal with top flight club S.C. Olhanense. On 6 September 2013, following three years of little playing time, narrowly avoiding relegation in his last, he rejoined Académica.

On 23 June 2016, in spite of his team's relegation to the Segunda Liga, the 34-year-old Piloto renewed his contract – about to expire – for another year.

== Coaching career ==
After retiring, Piloto worked as assistant manager of amateurs União Futebol Clube and top-tier B-SAD. In between, he acted as head coach to Académica's under-17 side.

Piloto joined newly appointed Vítor Bruno's staff at Porto in June 2024. He had previously been coached as a player by the latter and his predecessor Sérgio Conceição at Olhanense and Académica.

== Personal life ==
Still as a professional footballer, Piloto graduated from the University of Coimbra with a degree in biochemistry, majoring in 2005. This was followed by a master's degree in 2009.
