= Christopher Oualembo =

Congolese football player (born 1987)

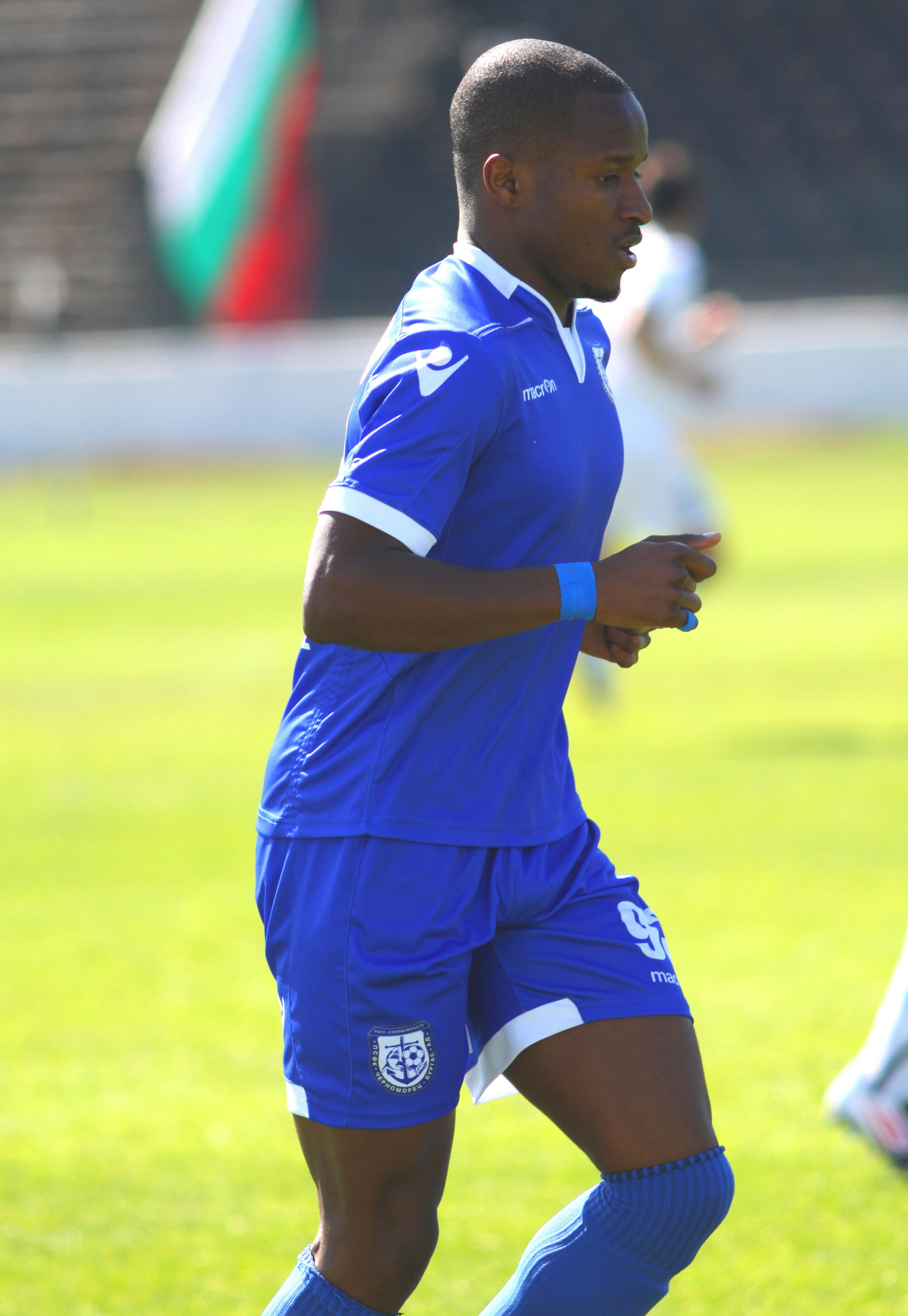
- Oualembo in 2012

Personal information
- Full name: Christopher Clark Oualembo
- Date of birth: 31 January 1987 (age 39)
- Place of birth: Saint-Germain-en-Laye, France
- Height: 1.78 m (5 ft 10 in)
- Position: Full-back

Youth career
- Paris Saint-Germain

Senior career*
Years	Team	Apps	(Gls)
2004–2006	Paris Saint-Germain	15	(0)
2006–2007	US Quevilly	11	(0)
2007–2008	Levante	7	(0)
2009–2011	Monza	42	(1)
2012	Chernomorets Burgas	11	(0)
2012–2014	Lechia Gdańsk	26	(0)
2012–2014	Lechia Gdańsk II	10	(1)
2014–2016	Académica	31	(0)
Total		153	(2)

International career
2008–2016	Congo DR	13	(0)
- * Club domestic league appearances and goals

Christopher Clark Oualembo (born 31 January 1987) is a Congolese former professional footballer.

== Club career ==
Oualembo began his career with Paris SG. Then he joined US Quevilly for the 2006–07 season. In January 2007 he moved to Levante UD and left the club in May 2008. On 30 July 2009 he joined Monza. On 22 January 2012, he signed with Chernomorets Burgas. He was released in early June 2012. On 15 October 2012, he signed with Lechia Gdańsk.

After two seasons in Poland, Oualembo moved to Portugal signing a two-year deal with Académica de Coimbra. He made his debut in a 0–2 home defeat against S.L. Benfica.

== International career ==
He made his first cap for Congo DR national football team against Gabon on 25 March 2008.

== Honours ==
DR Congo

- Africa Cup of Nations bronze:2015
