= Lee Oliveira =

Brazilian footballer (born 1988)

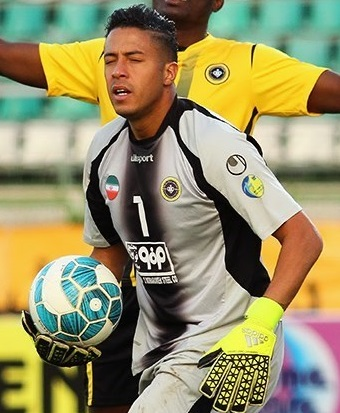
- Lee with Sepahan in 2016

Personal information
- Full name: Lee Winston Leandro da Silva Oliveira
- Date of birth: March 9, 1988 (age 38)
- Place of birth: São Paulo, Brazil
- Height: 1.88 m (6 ft 2 in)
- Position: Goalkeeper

Team information
- Current team: Tubarão

Youth career
- Vitória

Senior career*
Years	Team	Apps	(Gls)
2008–2010	Vitória	11	(0)
2008	→ Colo Colo-BA (loan)		
2009	→ Tigres do Brasil (loan)		
2011–2014	Atlético Mineiro	1	(0)
2012	→ Boa Esporte (loan)	1	(0)
2014–2016	Académica	11	(0)
2016–2018	Sepahan	37	(0)
2019	Caxias	12	(0)
2019–	Tubarão	0	(0)
- * Club domestic league appearances and goals as of 16:35, 20 January 2020 (UTC)

Lee Winston Leandro da Silva Oliveira, or simply Lee (born 9 March 1988 in São Paulo) is a goalkeeper who plays for Clube Atlético Tubarão.

== Career ==
Lee Oliveira started his career with loan spells to Colo Colo-BA and Tigres do Brasil before he was handed his professional debut with Vitória. His league debut was on 24 June 2010 in a 0-0 draw against Grêmio Barueri. He has achieved notoriety in his next match against Santos when he saved an Antonin Panenka-style penalty kick from Neymar after standing still in the goal.

After being released from Vitória, Lee Oliveira signed for Atlético Mineiro as a third goalkeeper for the team behind Renan Ribeiro and Giovanni. His league debut for Galo was on 27 November 2011 against Botafogo, playing the entire second half of the match.

In July 2014, Lee Oliveira moved abroad, signing a three-year contract with Académica de Coimbra in Portugal. He made his debut in a 2014–15 Taça de Portugal game against Santa Maria F.C.

On 8 June 2016, after suffering top flight relegation with Académica, Lee signed a one-year deal with Sepahan F.C.

=== Career statistics ===
(Correct as of June 11, 2012)

Club	Season	State League		Brazilian Série A		Copa do Brasil		Copa Libertadores		Copa Sudamericana		Total	
Club	Season	Apps	Goals	Apps	Goals	Apps	Goals	Apps	Goals	Apps	Goals	Apps	Goals
Vitória	2010	-	-	9	0	1	0	-	-	1	0	11	0
Total		-	-	9	0	1	0	-	-	1	0	11	0
Atlético Mineiro	2011	-	-	1	0	-	-	-	-	-	-	1	0
Atlético Mineiro	2012	-	-	0	0	-	-	-	-	-	-	0	0
Total		-	-	1	0	-	-	-	-	-	-	1	0

== Honours ==
Vitória

- Campeonato Baiano: 2010
- Campeonato do Nordeste: 2010

Atlético Mineiro

- Campeonato Mineiro: 2012, 2013
- Copa Libertadores: 2013
