= Lucas Mineiro (footballer, born 1992) =

Brazilian footballer

Personal information
- Full name: Lucas Alberto Pereira da Silva
- Date of birth: 16 June 1992 (age 34)
- Place of birth: Montes Claros, Brazil
- Height: 1.73 m (5 ft 8 in)
- Position: Midfielder

Youth career
- 2010–2012: Vitória

Senior career*
Years	Team	Apps	(Gls)
2012–2014	Vitória	41	(5)
2013	→ Ceará (loan)	1	(0)
2014–2015	Académica	11	(2)
2016	Anápolis	0	(0)
2016–	Tombense	3	(0)
- * Club domestic league appearances and goals as of 21 May 2016

Lucas Alberto Pereira da Silva (born 16 June 1992), simply known as Lucas Mineiro, is a Brazilian professional footballer who plays as a midfielder for Tombense Futebol Clube.

== Career ==
Born in Montes Claros, Brazil, Lucas Mineiro is product of Vitória youth ranks. On 23 July 2014, Lucas Mineiro started his first experience abroad, joining Académica on a two-year deal.

He made his debut for Académica at 10 January 2015, in a 2–2 draw against Paços de Ferreira, scoring the 2–1. On 4 August 2015, Mineiro terminated his contract with Académica.
