= Richard Ofori (defender) =

Ghanaian footballer (born 1993)

Personal information
- Full name: Richard Ofori
- Date of birth: 24 April 1993 (age 33)
- Place of birth: Accra, Ghana
- Height: 1.81 m (5 ft 11 in)
- Position: Defender

Team information
- Current team: Ethnikos Achna
- Number: 37

Youth career
- 2010−2011: Mighty Jets

Senior career*
Years	Team	Apps	(Gls)
2011–2013	Mighty Jets		
2011–2012	→ Charleroi (loan)	1	(0)
2013	→ Lierse (loan)	8	(0)
2013−2016	Académica	20	(0)
2013–2014	→ Beira-Mar (loan)	5	(0)
2016–2017	Covilhã	16	(0)
2017–2020	Fafe	71	(3)
2020–2022	Vizela	49	(0)
2022–2024	Nea Salamina	45	(0)
2024–	Ethnikos Achna	43	(1)

International career
2013	Ghana U20		
- * Club domestic league appearances and goals as of 14 June 2026

Richard Ofori (born 24 April 1993) is a Ghanaian professional footballer who plays as a defender for Ethnikos Achna.

== Club career ==
Born in Accra, Ofori played youth football for Mighty Jets, signing a one-year loan contract with Charleroi in 2011. Ofori made his competitive debut for Charleroi against Tubize on 29 Abril 2012 in the Belgian Pro League. Ofori then signed, on 21 January 2013, a six months loan contract with Lierse. He made his debut from the start in a 2–0 defeat to Zulte Waregem on 26 January 2013.

On 2 September 2013, Ofori was signed by Académica and was immediately sent on loan to Beira-Mar.
