= Ricardo Nascimento (Brazilian footballer) =

Brazilian footballer

Personal information
- Full name: Ricardo dos Santos Nascimento
- Date of birth: 7 February 1987 (age 39)
- Place of birth: Ilhéus, Brazil
- Height: 1.91 m (6 ft 3 in)
- Position: Centre-back

Team information
- Current team: Royal AM F.C.
- Number: 3

Youth career
- 2007: Friburguense

Senior career*
Years	Team	Apps	(Gls)
2007–2008	Palmeiras	0	(0)
2008–2015	Olé Brasil	0	(0)
2009–2010	→ Penafiel (loan)	23	(2)
2010–2011	→ Portimonense (loan)	13	(0)
2011	→ Comercial (loan)		
2011–2012	→ Astra Giurgiu (loan)	9	(0)
2012–2013	→ Portimonense (loan)	33	(2)
2013–2014	→ Moreirense (loan)	40	(3)
2014–2015	→ Académica (loan)	31	(0)
2015–2016	Académica	25	(2)
2016–2022	Mamelodi Sundowns	92	(12)
2022–	Royal AM F.C.	24	(2)
- * Club domestic league appearances and goals as of 12 February 2017

Ricardo dos Santos Nascimento (born 7 February 1987), simply known as Ricardo Nascimento is a Brazilian footballer who plays as a centre-back for Royal AM F.C..

== Career ==
After an unsuccessful spell at Palmeiras, he joined Olé Brasil in 2008. Nascimento spent the following seasons on loan at Penafiel followed by Portimonense. He then returned to Brazil before embracing Romanian football with Astra Giurgiu.

He again spent the 2012–13 season with Portimonense. It was followed by another loan spell with Moreirense. In 2014, he entered Primeira Liga with Académica.

In 2016, Nascimento moved to South Africa to play for the Mamelodi Sundowns. After six years, he moved to Durban-based Premier Division rivals Royal AM F.C. Nascimento has played in 116 South African Premier Division matches as of 29 December 2023.

== Honours ==
Mamelodi Sundowns

- South African Premier Division: 2017–18, 2018–19, 2019–20, 2020–21
- Nedbank Cup: 2019–20
- Telkom Knockout: 2019
- CAF Super Cup: 2017.
