= 2012–13 Associação Académica de Coimbra – O.A.F. season =

Académica
2012–13 season
- President: José Eduardo Simões
- Coach: Pedro Emanuel
- Stadium: Estádio Cidade de Coimbra
- Primeira Liga: 11th
- Taça de Portugal: Quarter-finals
- Taça da Liga: Third round
- UEFA Europa League: Group stage
- Supertaça Cândido de Oliveira: Runners-up
- Top goalscorer: League: Edinho (9); All: Edinho (13)
- Highest home attendance: 8,270 vs Benfica (23 September)
- Lowest home attendance: 920 vs Olhanense (30 December)
Home colours	Away colours

The 2012–13 season is Académica de Coimbra's 11th season in the top flight, the Primeira Liga since returning to first division in the 2002–03 season. As the title holders of the Taça de Portugal, Académica faced Porto in the Supertaça Cândido de Oliveira, losing 1–0. Also, by winning the 2011–12 Taça de Portugal, the club entered directly to the group stage of the 2012–13 UEFA Europa League for the first time.

== Review and events ==
Académica signed Rafik Halliche, Serge N’Gal, Bruno China, Cleyton, Marcos Paulo, Rodrigo Galo, Wilson Eduardo, John Ogu, Carlos Saleiro, Afonso, Salim Cissé and Lassana Camará.

== Competitions ==
=== Legend ===
Win Draw Loss Postponed

== Super Cup ==
11 August 2012 Final	Porto	1–0	Académica de Coimbra	Aveiro
20:45	Defour (yellow card) 53'; Otamendi (yellow card) 88'; Martínez 90', (yellow card) 90'	Summary	Cabral (yellow card) 61'	Stadium: Estádio Municipal de Aveiro; Attendance: 26,000; Referee: Olegário Benquerença

=== Primeira Liga ===
==== League table ====
Pos	Team	Pld	W	D	L	GF	GA	GD	Pts	Qualification or relegation
9	Vitória de Guimarães	30	11	7	12	36	47	−11	40 (Note: Nacional ahead of Vitória de Guimarães on head-to-head record; Nacional–Vitória de Guimarães 2–1, Vitória de Guimarães–Nacional 1–3)	Qualification for the Europa League group stage (Note: Vitória de Guimarães qualified for the group stage of 2013–14 UEFA Europa League after winning the 2012–13 Taça de Portugal.)
10	Marítimo	30	9	11	10	34	45	−11	38	
11	Académica	30	6	10	14	33	45	−12	28	
12	Vitória de Setúbal	30	7	5	18	30	55	−25	26	
13	Gil Vicente	30	6	7	17	31	54	−23	25 (Note: Gil Vicente ahead of Olhanense on head-to-head record; Gil Vicente–Olhanense 2–0, Olhanense–Gil Vicente 2–2)	

Source: LPFP (in Portuguese)
Rules for classification: 1) Points; 2) Head-to-head points; 3) Head-to-head goal difference; 4) Head-to-head away goals scored; 5) Goal difference; 6) Matches won; 7) Goals scored; 8) Play-off.
(Note: LPFP decided that only criteria 1, 5, 6 and 7 would be applied to establish the classification during the competition.)

==== Matches ====
20 August 2012 1	Beira-Mar	3–3	Académica de Coimbra	Aveiro
21:15	Balboa 7' (pen.), (yellow card) 36'; Camará 42', 56'; Collet (yellow card) 67'; Fleurival (yellow card) 73'; Ribeiro (yellow card) 79'; Joãozinho (yellow card) 88'	Summary	Real (red card) 7'; Reiner (yellow card) 58'; Makelele (yellow card) 62'; Cissé 69'; Ogu (yellow card) 73'; Edinho 81', 87'	Stadium: Estádio Municipal de Aveiro; Attendance: 2,830; Referee: Manuel Sousa

24 August 2012 2	Académica de Coimbra	1–1	Olhanense	Coimbra
21:15	Ogu (yellow card) 47'; Edinho 53', (yellow card) 90+2'; Makelele (yellow card) 61'; Cissé (yellow card) 79'	Summary	Ivanildo (yellow card) 41'; Silva 68'; Ricardo (yellow card) 83'; Luís Filipe (yellow card) 90+2'	Stadium: Estádio Cidade de Coimbra; Attendance: 3,167; Referee: Cosme Machado

2 September 2012 3	Rio Ave	0–0	Académica de Coimbra	Vila do Conde
19:00	Nivaldo (yellow card) 66'	Summary		Stadium: Estádio do Rio Ave FC; Attendance: 1,321; Referee: Nuno Almeida

23 September 2012 4	Académica de Coimbra	2–2	Benfica	Coimbra
21:15	Cissé 26' (pen.); Galo (red card) 50'; Dias (yellow card) 54'; Reiner (yellow card) 61'; Eduardo 69' (pen.); Ogu (yellow card) 77'	Summary	Pereira (yellow card) 25'; Cardozo 51' (pen.); Melgarejo (yellow card) 54'; Garay (yellow card) 69'; Lima 85'	Stadium: Estádio Cidade de Coimbra; Attendance: 8,270; Referee: Carlos Xistra

30 September 2012 5	Marítimo	0–2	Académica de Coimbra	Funchal
19:15	D. Dias (yellow card) 36'; Héldon (yellow card) 78'	Summary	Eduardo 11', (yellow card) 68'; J. Dias (yellow card) 27'; Marinho 43', (yellow card) 60'	Stadium: Estádio dos Barreiros; Attendance: 3,429; Referee: Hugo Pacheco

7 October 2012 6	Académica de Coimbra	1–2	Vitória de Guimarães	Coimbra
19:30	Marinho 23'; Reiner (yellow card) 55'; Dias (yellow card) 74'; Ogu (yellow card) 88' (yellow-red card) 88'; Keita (yellow card) 90+1'; Ferreira (yellow card) 90+2'	Summary	Soudani 67', 87'; Defendi (yellow card) 76'	Stadium: Estádio Cidade de Coimbra; Attendance: 4,444; Referee: Duarte Gomes

29 October 2012 7	Sporting CP	0–0	Académica de Coimbra	Lisbon
21:15	A. Silva (yellow card) 43'; Rinaudo (yellow card) 72'; Pranjić (yellow card) 78'; Viola (yellow card) 81'; Van Wolfswinkel (yellow card) 87'; Izmailov (yellow card) 89'	Summary	Ferreira (yellow card) 15'; Galo (yellow card) 33'; Lopes (yellow card) 88'	Stadium: Estádio José Alvalade; Attendance: 25,056; Referee: Bruno Esteves

4 November 2012 8	Académica de Coimbra	0–2	Estoril	Coimbra
19:00	Keita (yellow card) 73'; Edinho (yellow card) 86' (yellow-red card) 90'; Bruno China (red card) 88'; Eduardo (yellow card) 89'	Summary	Evandro (yellow card) 51'; Nascimento 84'; Licá 90+4'	Stadium: Estádio Cidade de Coimbra; Attendance: 3,056; Referee: Marco Ferreira

11 November 2012 9	Porto	2–1	Académica de Coimbra	Porto
19:00	Rodríguez 50'; Moutinho 62'; Ba (yellow card) 75'	Summary	Reiner (yellow card) 77'; Eduardo 79'; Ogu (yellow card) 83'	Stadium: Estádio do Dragão; Attendance: 31,910; Referee: Hugo Pacheco

25 November 2012 10	Académica de Coimbra	2–2	Gil Vicente	Coimbra
19:00	Ferreira 49'; Edinho 84'	Summary	Éder (yellow card) 27'; Amaral (yellow card) 40'; Araújo (yellow card) 42', (goal) 68'; Cláudio 73'; P. Pereira (yellow card) 85'	Stadium: Estádio Cidade de Coimbra; Attendance: 2,258; Referee: João Capela

10 December 2012 11	Académica de Coimbra	1–4	Braga	Coimbra
19:15	Cissé (yellow card) 82', (goal) 86'	Summary	Ismaily 8'; Amorim 16'; Mossoró 64'; Barbosa (yellow card) 77'; Carlão 80'	Stadium: Estádio Cidade de Coimbra; Attendance: 2,741; Referee: Artur Soares Dias

16 December 2012 12	Moreirense	2–2	Académica de Coimbra	Moreira de Cónegos
17:00	Fernandes (yellow card) 4'; Ghilas 27'; Wagner 30'; Espinho (yellow card) 62'	Summary	Makelele (yellow card) 21'; Cleyton (yellow card) 32'; Afonso (yellow card) 37'; Edinho 43', (yellow card) 73'; Nivaldo (yellow card) 87'; Cissé 90+3'	Stadium: Parque de Jogos Comendador Joaquim de Almeida Freitas; Attendance: 1,234; Referee: Luís Ferreira

5 January 2013 13	Académica de Coimbra	4–2	Vitória de Setúbal	Coimbra
19:00	Cissé 12'; Edinho 15', 27', 84'; Reiner (yellow card) 76'	Summary	Tavares (yellow card) 23'; Meyong (yellow card) 62', (goal) 78' (pen.); Cristiano 67'	Stadium: Estádio Cidade de Coimbra; Attendance: 2,287; Referee: Cosme Machado

13 January 2013 14	Paços de Ferreira	1–0	Académica de Coimbra	Paços de Ferreira
17:00	Hurtado 51'; Leão (yellow card) 52'; Tony (yellow card) 58'; Ricardo (yellow card) 71' (yellow-red card) 87'	Summary	Real (yellow card) 44'; Ferreira (yellow card) 51'; Ricardo (yellow card) 70'	Stadium: Estádio da Mata Real; Attendance: 1,378; Referee: Jorge Ferreira

21 January 2013 15	Académica de Coimbra	2–1	Nacional	Coimbra
17:00	Makelele 46'; Cleyton (yellow card) 55'; Reiner (yellow card) 57'; Edinho (yellow card) 59', (goal) 81'; Bruno China (yellow card) 72'	Summary	Rondón 21'; Da Costa (yellow card) 38'; Aurélio (red card) 39'; Mexer (yellow card) 72'; Revson (yellow card) 76' (yellow-red card) 83'	Stadium: Estádio Cidade de Coimbra; Attendance: 2,664; Referee: Vasco Santos

25 January 2013 16	Académica de Coimbra	3–1	Beira-Mar	Coimbra
17:00	Marinho 15', (yellow card) 84'; Edinho 35', (yellow card) 83'; Cleyton 37'; Reiner (yellow card) 81'	Summary	Dias (yellow card) 27'; Moreira (yellow card) 55'; Ribeiro 84' (pen.); Camará (yellow card) 84'	Stadium: Estádio Cidade de Coimbra; Attendance: 2,521; Referee: Hugo Miguel

3 February 2013 17	Olhanense	0–0	Académica de Coimbra	Olhão Municipality
17:00	Luís Filipe (yellow card) 85'	Report	Bruno China (yellow card) 16'; Edinho (red card) 38'; Marinho (yellow card) 66'	Stadium: Estádio José Arcanjo; Attendance: 1329; Referee: Pedro Proença

10 February 2013 18	Académica de Coimbra	1–2	Rio Ave	Coimbra
17:00	Cissé 50'	Report	Filipe Augusto (yellow card) 15'; Hassan 30'; Bébé 54', (yellow card) 70'; Lopes (yellow card) 56'; Edimar (yellow card) 65'; Oblak (yellow card) 84'; Lionn (yellow card) 88'; Marcelo (yellow card) 90+1'	Stadium: Estádio Cidade de Coimbra; Attendance: 2250; Referee: Carlos Xistra

17 February 2013 19	Benfica	1–0	Académica de Coimbra	Lisbon
20:15	Lima 90+4' (pen.)	Report		Stadium: Estádio da Luz; Attendance: 32,206; Referee: Nuno Almeida

25 February 2013 20	Académica de Coimbra	2–3	Marítimo	Coimbra
21:00	Edinho 45+2'; Eduardo 90+4'	Summary	Dias 6'; Artur 25', (yellow card) 45+1'; Rosário (yellow card) 37'; Simão (yellow card) 45+1'; Sami 48'; Salin (yellow card) 61'; Briguel (yellow card) 67'	Stadium: Estádio Cidade de Coimbra; Attendance: 2,807; Referee: Olegário Benquerença

4 March 2013 21	Vitória de Guimarães	2–0	Académica de Coimbra	Guimarães
19:15	Rodrigues 4', (yellow card) 78'; Soudani 20', (yellow card) 27'; Olímpio (yellow card) 46'; Oliveira (yellow card) 58'	Summary	Halliche (yellow card) 42'; Makelele (yellow card) 60'; Edinho (yellow card) 82'	Stadium: Estádio D. Afonso Henriques; Attendance: 7,302; Referee: Vasco Santos

9 March 2013 22	Académica de Coimbra	1–1	Sporting CP	Coimbra
21:15	Eduardo 26' (pen.); Cabral (yellow card) 74'; Marcos Paulo (yellow card) 78'; Ricardo (yellow card) 90+2'	Summary	Fokobo (yellow card) 25'; Cédric (yellow card) 44'; Van Wolfswinkel 78'	Stadium: Estádio Cidade de Coimbra; Attendance: 6,086; Referee: Hugo Pacheco

17 March 2013 23	Estoril	2–0	Académica de Coimbra	Estoril
17:00	Licá 8'; Carlos Eduardo (yellow card) 9', (goal) 26'; Gerso (yellow card) 60'; Vitória (yellow card) 62'	Summary	Marcos Paulo (yellow card) 17'; Edinho (yellow card) 85'; Cleyton (yellow card) 85'	Stadium: Estádio António Coimbra da Mota; Attendance: 1,512; Referee: Jorge Ferreira

30 March 2013 24	Académica de Coimbra	0–3	Porto	Coimbra
19:15	Bruno China (yellow card) 24'	Summary	Mangala 16', (yellow card) 34'; Danilo 52'; Otamendi (yellow card) 61'; Moutinho (yellow card) 88'; Castro 89'	Stadium: Estádio Cidade de Coimbra; Attendance: 5,832; Referee: Bruno Esteves

7 April 2013 25	Gil Vicente	2–1	Académica de Coimbra	Barcelos, Portugal
17:00	Cunha (yellow card) 33'; Halisson (yellow card) 41'; Brito 62'; Peixoto (yellow card) 65'; Bruno China 69' (o.g.)	Summary	Real (yellow card) 31'; Eduardo 42', (yellow card) 64'	Stadium: Estádio Cidade de Barcelos; Attendance: 4,728; Referee: João Ferreira

19 April 2013 26	Braga	1–0	Académica de Coimbra	Braga
21:00	Rúben Micael 45'	Summary	Cabral (yellow card) 41'; Reiner (yellow card) 71'	Stadium: Estádio Municipal de Braga; Attendance: 18,401; Referee: Hugo Miguel

28 April 2013 27	Académica de Coimbra	1–0	Moreirense	Coimbra
21:15	Marinho 18', (yellow card) 68'; Ferreira (yellow card) 60'; Reiner (yellow card) 62'; Cissé (yellow card) 75'; Galo (yellow card) 89'	Summary	Gonçalves (yellow card) 90'	Stadium: Estádio Cidade de Coimbra; Attendance: 12,739; Referee: Pedro Proença

5 May 2013 28	Vitória de Setúbal	0–1	Académica de Coimbra	Setúbal
17:00	Santos (yellow card) 32' (yellow-red card) 85'; Queirós (yellow card) 60'	Summary	Galo (yellow card) 27'; Marinho (yellow card) 34'; Bruno China (yellow card) 72'; Ogu 78'	Stadium: Estádio do Bonfim; Attendance: 3,779; Referee: Manuel Sousa

12 May 2013 29	Académica de Coimbra	1–1	Paços de Ferreira	Coimbra
19:15	Ogu (yellow card) 25'; Edinho 72' (pen.); Cleyton (yellow card) 75'; Makelele (yellow card) 90+2'	Summary	Manuel José 55'; Poulson (yellow card) 71'	Stadium: Estádio Cidade de Coimbra; Attendance: 8,799; Referee: Duarte Gomes

19 May 2013 30	Nacional	2–1	Académica de Coimbra	Funchal
19:30	Candeias 41'; Keita 64'	Report	Edinho 48' (pen.)	Stadium: Estádio da Madeira; Attendance: 2,784; Referee: João Ferreira

=== Taça de Portugal ===
21 October 2012 Round 3	Ponte da Barca	1–3	Académica de Coimbra	Ponte da Barca
15:00		Summary		Stadium: Campo Municipal Ponte da Barca

18 November 2012 Round 4	Académica de Coimbra	1–0 (a.e.t.)	Penalva do Castelo	Coimbra
17:00	Real (yellow card) 54'; Dias (yellow card) 88'; Edinho 108' (pen.)	Summary	Gamarra (yellow card) 90'; Gui (yellow card) 90+1'	Stadium: Estádio Cidade de Coimbra; Attendance: 1,218; Referee: João Lopes Ferreira

1 December 2012 Round 5	Académica de Coimbra	3–0	Tourizense	Coimbra
18:00	Nivaldo (yellow card) 13', (goal) 90+4'; Dias (yellow card) 25'; Edinho 37'; Ogu (yellow card) 39'; Afonso (yellow card) 47'; Reiner (yellow card) 49'; Eduardo (yellow card) 56', (goal) 81' (pen.)	Summary		Stadium: Estádio Cidade de Coimbra; Attendance: 1,239; Referee: Rui Manuel Gomes Costa

17 January 2013 Quarter-final	Académica de Coimbra	0–4	Benfica	Coimbra
21:45	Keita (yellow card) 32'; Ferreira (yellow card) 80'	Summary	John 5'; Lima 9', 27'; Jardel (yellow card) 40'; Salvio 71'	Stadium: Estádio Cidade de Coimbra; Attendance: 7,498; Referee: Manuel Sousa

=== Taça da Liga ===
==== Round 2 ====
8 September 2012 First leg	Sporting da Covilhã	2–0	Académica de Coimbra	Covilhã
22:00	Fabrício 28'; Silva 65', (yellow card) 74'; Fernandes (yellow card) 90+2'	Summary	Ferreira (yellow card) 7'; Cleyton (yellow card) 41'; Reiner (yellow card) 90'	Stadium: Complexo Desportivo da Covilhã; Attendance: 535; Referee: Paulo Baptista

14 October 2012 Second leg	Académica de Coimbra	2–0 (a.e.t.) (3–2 p)	Sporting da Covilhã	Coimbra
19:00	Edinho 32', 73'; Bruno China (yellow card) 45+2'; Cleyton (yellow card) 80'	Summary	Silva (yellow card) 35'; Grilo (yellow card) 58'; Araújo (yellow card) 79'; José Gaspar (yellow card) 81'	Stadium: Estádio Cidade de Coimbra; Attendance: 951; Referee: Rui Costa

==== Group D ====
Team	Pld	W	D	L	GF	GA	GD	Pts
Benfica	3	2	1	0	6	4	+2	7
Moreirense	3	0	3	0	3	3	0	3
Académica	3	0	2	1	4	5	-1	2
Olhanense	3	0	2	1	1	2	-1	2

19 December 2012 1	Moreirense	2–2	Académica	Moreira de Cónegos
17:00	Augusto (yellow card) 63'; Ghilas 84', 90+3'	Summary	Keita 12'; Eduardo 51'; Nivaldo (yellow card) 58' (yellow-red card) 74'	Stadium: Parque de Jogos Comendador Joaquim de Almeida Freitas; Attendance: 438; Referee: Bruno Paixão

30 December 2012 2	Académica de Coimbra	0–0	Olhanense	Coimbra
17:00	Halliche (yellow card) 55' (yellow-red card) 66'; Saleiro (yellow card) 63'	Summary	Jander (yellow card) 25'; Piloto (yellow card) 59'; Brandão (yellow card) 66'	Stadium: Estádio Cidade de Coimbra; Attendance: 920; Referee: João Ferreira

9 January 2013 3	Benfica	3–2	Académica de Coimbra	Lisbon
20:45	Lima 40', 66'; Alan Kardec 62'; Martins (yellow card) 90'	Summary	Makelele 44', (yellow card) 69'; Saleiro 50'; Reiner (yellow card) 52' (yellow-red card) 69'; Keita (yellow card) 90'	Stadium: Estádio da Luz; Attendance: 13,872; Referee: Manuel Mota

=== UEFA Europa League ===
==== Group stage ====
Team	Pld	W	D	L	GF	GA	GD	Pts
(Czech Republic) Viktoria Plzeň	6	4	1	1	11	4	+7	13
(Spain) Atlético Madrid	6	4	0	2	7	4	+3	12
(Portugal) Académica	6	1	2	3	6	9	−3	5
(Israel) Hapoel Tel Aviv	6	1	1	4	4	11	−7	4

20 September 2012 1	(Czech Republic) Viktoria Plzeň	3–1	(Portugal) Académica	Plzeň
19:00	Horváth 46', (yellow card) 49'; Ďuriš 58'; Rajtoral 80'; Kozáčik (yellow card) 88'	Summary	Eduardo 19'; Halliche (yellow card) 21'; Cissé (yellow card) 50'; Edinho (yellow card) 78'; Ogu (yellow card) 82'	Stadium: Stadion města Plzně; Attendance: 10,848; Referee: (Estonia) Hannes Kaasik

4 October 2012 2	(Portugal) Académica	1–1	(Israel) Hapoel Tel Aviv	Coimbra
21:05	Cissé 47'	Summary	Gordana (yellow card) 60'; Badir (yellow card) 89'; Damari 90+2'	Stadium: Estádio Cidade de Coimbra; Attendance: 5,676; Referee: (Switzerland) Stephan Studer

25 October 2012 Match 3	(Spain) Atlético Madrid	2–1	(Portugal) Académica	Madrid
21:05	Costa 48'; Belözoğlu 68'; Saúl (yellow card) 86'	Summary	Lopes (yellow card) 62'; Cissé 85'; Bruno China (yellow card) 90+1'	Stadium: Vicente Calderón Stadium; Attendance: 15,749; Referee: (Scotland) Bobby Madden

8 November 2012 4	(Portugal) Académica	2–0	(Spain) Atlético Madrid	Coimbra
19:00	Eduardo (yellow card) 13', (goal) 28', 70' (pen.); Nivaldo (yellow card) 41'; Cleyton (yellow card) 58'; Real (yellow card) 84'; Makelele (yellow card) 90+1'	Summary	Sílvio (yellow card) 47'; García (yellow card) 54'; Díaz (yellow card) 76'	Stadium: Estádio Cidade de Coimbra; Attendance: 4,652; Referee: (England) Lee Probert

22 November 2012 5	(Portugal) Académica	1–1	(Czech Republic) Viktoria Plzeň	Coimbra
21:05	Dias (yellow card) 57'; Ricardo (yellow card) 66'; Eduardo (yellow card) 77'; Marinho (yellow card) 79'; Edinho 88' (pen.); Ferreira (yellow card) 90'	Summary	Štípek (yellow card) 48'; Darida (yellow card) 54'; Horváth 57' (pen.); Hora (yellow card) 63'	Stadium: Estádio Cidade de Coimbra; Attendance: 3,717; Referee: (Poland) Marcin Borski

6 December 2012 6	(Israel) Hapoel Tel Aviv	2–0	(Portugal) Académica	Tel Aviv
19:00	Merey 56'; Hutba (yellow card) 64'; Maman 80'	Summary		Stadium: Bloomfield Stadium; Attendance: 10,000; Referee: (Russia) Alexey Nikolaev

== Current squad ==
As of December 30, 2012.

Note: Flags indicate national team as defined under FIFA eligibility rules; some limited exceptions apply. Players may hold more than one non-FIFA nationality.

No.	Pos.	Nation	Player
1	GK	FRA	Romuald Peiser
2	DF	POR	João Dias
3	DF	BRA	Júnior Lopes
4	MF	POR	Flávio Ferreira
5	DF	ALG	Rafik Halliche
6	MF	MLI	Alphousseyni Keita
7	FW	POR	Marinho
8	MF	BRA	Makelele
9	FW	CMR	Serge N'Gal
12	GK	POR	Ricardo
13	DF	POR	João Real
14	MF	POR	Bruno China
20	MF	BRA	Cleyton

No.	Pos.	Nation	Player
21	MF	BRA	Marcos Paulo
22	DF	BRA	Rodrigo Galo
24	GK	POR	Fábio Santos
26	DF	CPV	Nivaldo
28	FW	POR	Wilson Eduardo (on loan from Sporting CP)
30	MF	NGR	John Ogu
35	DF	BRA	Reiner
36	FW	POR	Edinho
39	FW	POR	Carlos Saleiro
55	DF	POR	Hélder Cabral
77	FW	BRA	Afonso (on loan from Corinthians Alagoano)
88	MF	CIV	Rodolph Amessan
92	FW	GUI	Salim Cissé
