= 2013–14 Associação Académica de Coimbra – O.A.F. season =

Académica
2013–14 season
- President: José Eduardo Simões
- Head coach: Sérgio Conceição
- Stadium: Estádio Cidade de Coimbra
- Primeira Liga: 8th
- Taça de Portugal: Quarter-finals
- Taça da Liga: Second round
- Top goalscorer: League: Marcos Paulo (5); All: Marcos Paulo (5)
- Highest home attendance: 14,194 vs Sporting (4 August 2013)
- Lowest home attendance: 1,617 vs Paços Ferreira (12 January 2014)
- Average home league attendance: 4,302

== Pre-season and friendlies ==
Win Draw Loss

17 July 2013 Friendly	Académica	4–0	Pampilhosa	Coimbra
10:00 WEST (UTC+01:00)	Djavan 48'; Marinho 49'; Marcos Paulo 54'; Buval 87'			Stadium: Estádio Cidade de Coimbra

20 July 2013 Friendly	Académica	1–0	Beira-Mar	Praia de Quiaios, Figueira da Foz
10:00 WEST (UTC+01:00)	André Sousa (o.g.)			Stadium: Centro de Estágio Rosa Náutica

23 July 2013 Friendly	Académica	3–0	Naval	Praia de Quiaios, Figueira da Foz
10:00 WEST (UTC+01:00)	Valente; Capela; Magique			Stadium: Centro de Estágio Rosa Náutica

26 July 2013 Friendly	Académica	1–0	Marítimo	Praia de Quiaios, Figueira da Foz
17:00 WEST (UTC+01:00)	Cleyton			Stadium: Centro de Estágio Rosa Náutica

31 July 2013 Friendly	Vitória Setúbal	2–1	Académica	Nazaré
16:00 WEST (UTC+01:00)	Cohene 23'; Bruninho 32'		Capela 88'	Stadium: Estádio Municipal de Nazaré

4 August 2013 Friendly	Académica	2–1	Rayo Vallecano (Spain)	Coimbra
20:30 WEST (UTC+01:00)	Marinho 28'; Buval 33'		Trashorras 24' (pen.)	Stadium: Estádio Cidade de Coimbra

7 August 2013 Friendly	Académica	2–0	Nogueirense	Coimbra
10:00 WEST (UTC+01:00)	Marcos Paulo; Manoel			Stadium: Academia Briosa XXI

7 August 2013 Friendly	Académica	2–1	Fátima	Coimbra
15:00 WEST (UTC+01:00)	Cleyton; Halliche		Goal	Stadium: Academia Briosa XXI

== Competitions ==
=== Primeira Liga ===
==== League table ====
Pos	Team	Pld	W	D	L	GF	GA	GD	Pts
6	Marítimo	30	11	8	11	40	44	−4	41
7	Vitória de Setúbal	30	10	9	11	41	41	0	39
8	Académica	30	9	10	11	25	35	−10	37 (Note: Académica ahead of Braga on head-to-head record; Académica–Braga 1–1, Braga–Académica 0–1)
9	Braga	30	10	7	13	39	37	+2	37
10	Vitória de Guimarães	30	10	5	15	30	35	−5	35

Source: LPFP (in Portuguese)
Rules for classification: 1) Points; 2) Head-to-head points; 3) Head-to-head goal difference; 4) Head-to-head away goals scored; 5) Goal difference; 6) Matches won; 7) Goals scored; 8) Play-off.
(Note: LPFP decided that only criteria 1, 5, 6 and 7 would be applied to establish the classification during the competition.)

==== Results summary ====
Overall								Home						Away					
Pld	W	D	L	GF	GA	GD	Pts	W	D	L	GF	GA	GD	W	D	L	GF	GA	GD
30	9	10	11	25	35	−10	37	5	6	4	13	16	−3	4	4	7	12	19	−7

Last updated: 10 October 2016.
Source: LPFP

==== Results by round ====
Round	1	2	3	4	5	6	7	8	9	10	11	12	13	14	15	16	17	18	19	20	21	22	23	24	25	26	27	28	29	30
Ground	A	H	A	H	A	H	H	A	H	A	H	A	H	A	H	H	A	H	A	H	A	A	H	A	H	A	H	A	H	A
Result	L	L	D	W	L	D	L	W	L	W	W	L	D	L	W	W	D	L	D	D	W	D	D	L	W	L	D	D	D	W
Position	12	16	14	13	14	14	15	11	14	11	9	12	12	12	10	9	8	9	9	10	7	9	10	10	6	9	9	9	9	8

Source: LPFP
A = Away; H = Home; W = Win; D = Draw; L = Loss

==== Matches ====
Win Draw Loss

18 August 2013 1	Gil Vicente	2–0	Académica	Barcelos
16:00 WEST (UTC+01:00)	Bruno Moraes 5' (pen.); Luís Martins 90+4'	Report		Stadium: Estádio Cidade de Barcelos; Attendance: 3,016; Referee: Pedro Proença

24 August 2013 2	Académica	0–4	Sporting CP	Coimbra
20:15 WEST (UTC+01:00)		Report	Carrillo 23'; Rojo 41'; Adrien 54' (pen.); Montero 58' (pen.)	Stadium: Estádio Cidade de Coimbra; Attendance: 14,194; Referee: Artur Soares Dias

2 September 2013 3	Estoril	1–1	Académica	Estoril
20:00 WEST (UTC+01:00)	Luís Leal 74'	Report	Cleyton 16'	Stadium: Estádio António Coimbra da Mota; Attendance: 2,658; Referee: Manuel Oliveira

15 September 2013 4	Académica	2–1	Belenenses	Coimbra
15:45 WEST (UTC+01:00)	China 57'; Marinho 71'	Report	Tiago Silva 40'	Stadium: Estádio Cidade de Coimbra; Attendance: 5,495; Referee: Duarte Gomes

22 September 2013 5	Nacional	1–0	Académica	Funchal
16:00 WEST (UTC+01:00)	Rondón 32'	Report		Stadium: Estádio da Madeira; Attendance: 1,794; Referee: Vasco Santos

28 September 2013 6	Académica	0–0	Arouca	Coimbra
16:00 WEST (UTC+01:00)		Report		Stadium: Estádio Cidade de Coimbra; Attendance: 2,352; Referee: Cosme Machado

4 October 2013 7	Académica	0–1	Rio Ave	Coimbra
20:15 WEST (UTC+01:00)		Report	Reiner 80' (o.g.)	Stadium: Estádio Cidade de Coimbra; Attendance: 2,345; Referee: Bruno Paixão

25 October 2013 8	Braga	0–1	Académica	Braga
20:15 WET (UTC+00:00)		Report	Fernando Alexandre 4'	Stadium: Estádio Municipal de Braga; Attendance: 8,131; Referee: Olegário Benquerença

1 November 2013 9	Académica	0–3	Benfica	Coimbra
20:30 WET (UTC+00:00)		Report	Cardozo 33'; Goiano 37' (o.g.); Marković 86'	Stadium: Estádio Cidade de Coimbra; Attendance: 8,551; Referee: Hugo Pacheco

25 November 2013 10	Olhanense	0–1	Académica	Olhão
20:15 WET (UTC+00:00)		Report	Magique 17'	Stadium: Estádio José Arcanjo; Attendance: 607; Referee: Manuel Oliveira

30 November 2013 11	Académica	1–0	Porto	Coimbra
21:15 WEST (UTC+00:00)	Fernando Alexandre 44'	Report		Stadium: Estádio Cidade de Coimbra; Attendance: 4,562; Referee: João Capela

9 December 2013 12	Vitória de Setúbal	1–0	Académica	Setúbal
20:15 WET (UTC+00:00)	Horta 73'	Report		Stadium: Estádio do Bonfim; Attendance: 1,415; Referee: Manuel Mota

13 December 2013 13	Académica	1–1	Marítimo	Coimbra
20:15 WET (UTC+00:00)	Makelele 41'	Report	Derley 71'	Stadium: Estádio Cidade de Coimbra; Attendance: 2,224; Referee: Luís Ferreira

21 December 2013 14	Vitória de Guimarães	3–0	Académica	Guimarães
18:15 WET (UTC+00:00)	Matias 27'; Barrientos 55'; André 59'	Report		Stadium: Estádio D. Afonso Henriques; Attendance: 9,515; Referee: Artur Soares Dias

12 January 2014 15	Académica	4–2	Paços de Ferreira	Coimbra
16:00 WET (UTC+00:00)	Magique 12'; João Real 46'; Cleyton 47'; Ivanildo 75'	Report	Manuel José 22' (pen.); Carlão 32'	Stadium: Estádio Cidade de Coimbra; Attendance: 1,617; Referee: Cosme Machado

19 January 2014 16	Académica	1–0	Gil Vicente	Coimbra
16:00 WET (UTC+00:00)	Djavan 90+2'	Report		Stadium: Estádio Cidade de Coimbra; Attendance: 2,736; Referee: Duarte Gomes

2 February 2014 17	Sporting CP	0–0	Académica	Lisbon
18:15 WET (UTC+00:00)		Report		Stadium: Estádio José Alvalade; Attendance: 36.168; Referee: Paulo Baptista

10 February 2014 18	Académica	0–1	Estoril	Coimbra
20:00 WET (UTC+00:00)		Report	Balboa 42'	Stadium: Estádio Cidade de Coimbra; Attendance: 1,944; Referee: Hugo Pacheco

15 February 2014 19	Belenenses	0–0	Académica	Lisbon
18:00 WET (UTC+00:00)		Report		Stadium: Estádio do Restelo; Attendance: 2,066; Referee: Manuel Mota

24 February 2014 20	Académica	0–0	Nacional	Coimbra
20:15 WET (UTC+00:00)		Report		Stadium: Estádio Cidade de Coimbra; Attendance: 2,102; Referee: Rui Silva

3 March 2014 21	Arouca	0–3	Académica	Arouca
20:00 WET (UTC+00:00)		Report	Marcos Paulo 42'; Valente 85'; Salvador Agra 89'	Stadium: Estádio Municipal de Arouca; Attendance: 1,032; Referee: Bruno Esteves

7 March 2014 22	Rio Ave	0–0	Académica	Vila do Conde
20:00 WET (UTC+00:00)		Report		Stadium: Estádio do Rio Ave; Attendance: 1,615; Referee: Duarte Gomes

14 March 2014 23	Académica	1–1	Braga	Coimbra
20:00 WET (UTC+00:00)	Makelele 31'	Report	Pardo 4'	Stadium: Estádio Cidade de Coimbra; Attendance: 3,697; Referee: Marco Ferreira

23 March 2014 24	Benfica	3–0	Académica	Lisbon
18:00 WET (UTC+00:00)	Lima 11', 27'; Pérez 59'	Report		Stadium: Estádio da Luz; Attendance: 49,320; Referee: Rui Costa

30 March 2014 25	Académica	2–1	Olhanense	Coimbra
16:00 WEST (UTC+01:00)	Marcos Paulo 34' (pen.) 77' (pen.)	Report	Paulo Sérgio 55'	Stadium: Estádio Cidade de Coimbra; Attendance: 2,196; Referee: Bruno Paixão

6 April 2014 26	Porto	3–1	Académica	Porto
19:15 WEST (UTC+01:00)	Martínez 4', 39' (pen.); Ghilas 23'	Report	Marcos Paulo 52'	Stadium: Estádio do Dragão; Attendance: 29,309; Referee: Manuel Mota

11 April 2014 27	Académica	1–1	Vitória de Setúbal	Coimbra
20:00 WEST (UTC+01:00)	Marcos Paulo 33' (pen.)	Report	Rafael 26'	Stadium: Estádio Cidade de Coimbra; Attendance: 3,489; Referee: Luís Ferreira

19 April 2014 28	Marítimo	3–1	Académica	Funchal
16:00 WEST (UTC+01:00)	Derley 16'; Marakis 20'; Fransérgio 90+6'	Report	Salvador Agra 51'	Stadium: Estádio dos Barreiros; Attendance: 1,957; Referee: Jorge Ferreira

4 May 2014 29	Académica	0–0	Vitória de Guimarães	Coimbra
18:00 WEST (UTC+01:00)		Report		Stadium: Estádio Cidade de Coimbra; Attendance: 10,614; Referee: Manuel Oliveira

10 May 2014 30	Paços de Ferreira	2–4	Académica	Paços de Ferreira
16:00 WEST (UTC+01:00)	Bebé 18', 32' (pen.)	Report	Guèye 7', 36'; Salvador Agra 15', 87'	Stadium: Estádio Capital do Móvel; Attendance: 3,780; Referee: João Capela

=== Taça de Portugal ===
==== Third round ====
20 October 2013 Third round	Belenenses	2–2 (2–4 p)	Académica	Lisbon
15:30 WEST (UTC+01:00)	Fredy 39', 70' (pen.)		Diakité 51' (o.g.); Alexandre 62'	Stadium: Estádio do Restelo; Attendance: 2,900; Referee: Marco Ferreira
	Penalties
	F. Ferreira (penalty scored); Fredy (penalty scored); Afonso (penalty missed); Diawara (penalty missed)		(penalty scored) Cleyton; (penalty scored) Alexandre; (penalty scored) Goiano; (penalty scored) Abdi

==== Fourth round ====
10 November 2013 Fourth round	Académica	1–1 (a.e.t.) (4–3 p)	Académico de Viseu	Coimbra
15:00 WET (UTC+00:00)	Valente 93'		Zé Rui 113'	Stadium: Estádio Cidade de Coimbra; Attendance: 1,486; Referee: Paulo Baptista
	Penalties
	Cleyton (penalty missed); Alexandre (penalty scored); Valente (penalty scored); Ivanildo (penalty scored); Magique (penalty scored)		(penalty missed) Diogo Alves; (penalty scored) Lança; (penalty missed) Luisinho; (penalty scored) Monteiro; (penalty scored) Martins

==== Fifth round ====
5 January 2014 Fifth round	Beira-Mar	0–1	Académica	Aveiro
15:00 WET (UTC+00:00)			Magique 25'	Stadium: Estádio Municipal de Aveiro; Attendance: 1,043; Referee: Pedro Proença

==== Quarter-finals ====
6 February 2014 Quarter-final	Rio Ave	1–0	Académica	Vila do Conde
19:00 WET (UTC+00:00)	Braga 77'			Stadium: Estádio do Rio Ave FC; Referee: Hugo Miguel

=== Taça da Liga ===
==== Second round ====
12 October 2013 First leg	Penafiel	2–1	Académica	Penafiel
16:00 WEST (UTC+00:00)	Vítor Bruno 6', 10'	Report	Rafael Oliveira 36'	Stadium: Estádio Municipal 25 de Abril; Attendance: 582; Referee: Jorge Tavares

16 November 2013 Second leg	Académica	0–0	Penafiel	Coimbra
17:00 WET (UTC+00:00)		Report		Stadium: Estádio Cidade de Coimbra; Attendance: 719; Referee: Jorge Ferreira

=== Overall record ===
Competition	First match	Last match	Record								
Competition	First match	Last match	G	W	D	L	GF	GA	GD	Win %	Source
Primeira Liga	18 August 2013	10 May 2014	30	9	10	11	25	35	−10	30.00	
Taça de Portugal	20 October 2013	6 February 2014	4	1	2	1	4	4	+0	25.00	
Taça da Liga	12 October 2013	16 November 2013	2	0	1	1	1	2	−1	0.00	
Total			57	42	10	5	101	35	+66	73.68	

== Player statistics ==
No.	Pos	Nat	Player	Total		Primeira Liga		Portuguese Cup		League Cup	
No.	Pos	Nat	Player	Apps	Goals	Apps	Goals	Apps	Goals	Apps	Goals
Goalkeepers
1	GK	(France) FRA	Romuald Peiser	2	0	0	0	0	0	2	0
12	GK	(Portugal) POR	Ricardo	34	0	30	0	4	0	0	0
24	GK	(Portugal) POR	Fábio Santos	19	0	14	0	4	0	1	0
Defenders
2	DF	(Portugal) POR	João Dias	8	0	5+2	0	0	0	1	0
3	DF	(Portugal) POR	Aníbal Capela	21	0	16+2	0	2	0	1	0
5	DF	(Algeria) ALG	Rafik Halliche	22	0	19+1	0	1	0	1	0
6	DF	(Brazil) BRA	Djavan	33	1	27	1	4	0	2	0
13	DF	(Portugal) POR	João Real	26	1	18+3	1	3	0	2	0
35	DF	(Brazil) BRA	Reiner Ferreira	10	0	7+1	0	2	0	0	0
63	DF	(Portugal) POR	Elton Monteiro	0	0	0	0	0	0	0	0
87	DF	(Brazil) BRA	Marcelo Goiano	30	0	25	0	4	0	1	0
Midfielders
8	MF	(Brazil) BRA	Makelele	27	2	22+1	2	2	0	1+1	0
14	MF	(Portugal) POR	Bruno China	23	1	18+3	1	1	0	1	0
20	MF	(Brazil) BRA	Cleyton	28	2	19+3	2	3+1	0	1+1	0
21	MF	(Brazil) BRA	Marcos Paulo	15	5	14+1	5	0	0	0	0
25	MF	(Portugal) POR	Paulo Grilo	2	0	1+1	0	0	0	0	0
28	MF	(Portugal) POR	Nuno Piloto	10	0	5+2	0	1+1	0	1	0
30	MF	(Nigeria) NGA	John Ogu	9	0	0+7	0	1+1	0	0	0
65	MF	(Portugal) POR	Fernando Alexandre	29	3	23	2	4	1	2	0
Strikers
7	FW	(Portugal) POR	Marinho	32	1	9+18	1	3	0	1+1	0
9	FW	(Martinique) MTQ	Bédi Buval	8	0	4+3	0	0	0	0+1	0
10	FW	(Guinea-Bissau) GNB	Ivanildo	25	1	17+4	1	2+1	0	1	0
11	FW	(Brazil) BRA	Manoel	19	0	4+11	0	1+1	0	0+2	0
16	FW	(Portugal) POR	Rafael Lopes	13	0	9+3	0	1	0	0	0
17	FW	(Somalia) SOM	Liban Abdi	12	0	10+1	0	0+1	0	0	0
18	FW	(Senegal) SEN	Moussa Gueye	9	2	6+2	2	0+1	0	0	0
23	FW	(Portugal) POR	Diogo Valente	27	2	9+12	1	2+2	1	2	0
29	FW	(Brazil) BRA	Rafael Oliveira	9	1	3+1	0	1+2	0	2	1
77	FW	(Portugal) POR	Salvador Agra	15	4	11+3	4	1	0	0	0
99	FW	(Ivory Coast) CIV	Magique	18	3	10+6	2	1+1	1	0	0

Last updated: 10 October 2016

== Technical staff ==
Position	Staff
Manager	Sérgio Conceição
Assistant managers	Jorge Rosário; Siramana Dembélé
Fitness coach	Vítor Bruno
Goalkeeping coach	Diamantino Figueiredo

Last updated: 10 October 2016
