= 2012 Supertaça Cândido de Oliveira =

- Event: Supertaça Cândido de Oliveira (Portuguese Super Cup)
Porto	Académica
1	0
- Date: 11 August 2012
- Venue: Estádio Municipal de Aveiro, Aveiro
- Man of the Match: Jackson Martínez (Porto)
- Referee: Olegário Benquerença (Leiria)
- Attendance: 26,825
- Weather: Clear sky 26 °C (79 °F)

The 2012 Supertaça Cândido de Oliveira was the 34th edition of the Supertaça Cândido de Oliveira, the annual Portuguese football season-opening match contested by the winners of the previous season's top league and cup competitions (or cup runner-up in case the league- and cup-winning club is the same). The match was contested between the 2011–12 Primeira Liga winners, Porto and the 2011–12 Taça de Portugal winners, Académica.

The final took place at Estádio Municipal de Aveiro in Aveiro on the 11 August 2012. Porto were making their twenty-eighth Supertaça appearance in which it was their seventh consecutive final since 2006 having won eighteen and lost ten. Académica were appearing in their first Supertaça.

Porto defeated Académica 1–0, with one goal in the last minute of the game from newly acquired Colombian forward Jackson Martínez, and collected a record fourth consecutive Super Cup, raising the club's tally to 19 trophies in this competition (67.8% of wins). In Portugal, the final was televised live in HD on RTP1. The game televised on RTP1 saw an average view rate of 974,000.

== Background ==
Porto were appearing in their 28th Supertaça Cândido de Oliveira in which it was their seven consecutive Supertaça appearance since 2006. Porto went into the match as 18-time winners (1981, 1983, 1984, 1986, 1990, 1991, 1993, 1994, 1996, 1998, 1999, 2001, 2003, 2004, 2006, 2009, 2010, 2011). Of their 27 Supertaça Cândido de Oliveira appearances, they had lost nine times (1979, 1985, 1988, 1992, 1995, 1997, 2000, 2007, 2008). Académica de Coimbra were appearing in their first Supertaça.

In Porto's and Académica's history, the two teams in their entire history had met on 128 different occasions. Porto had accumulated ninety victories whilst Académica had accumulated sixteen victories. Of those 128 encounters, twenty two of those games had ended in ties. The last meeting between these two teams in domestic league action saw Porto draw with The Students, 1–1 at the Estádio do Dragão in March 2012. The last meeting between these sides in the domestic cup competition saw Académica defeat the Dragons , 3–0 en route to the 2012 Taça de Portugal Final.

== Pre-match ==
=== Entry ===
Porto qualified for the 2012 Supertaça Cândido de Oliveira by winning the 2011–12 Primeira Liga. They fought off competition from Benfica and Braga to capture their twenty-sixth league title in their history. Six games from the end of the season, Benfica were one point ahead of Porto. The next four games for each side proved to be vital. From gameweek 24 to 27, Benfica managed seven points from a possible twelve whilst Porto capitalized on Benfica's mistakes of dropping points and managed to capture maximum of 12 points from 12. The pivotal win which clinched Porto the title was a 2–0 away win against Marítimo, where the following day Benfica drew their game away to Rio Ave which resulted in Porto capturing their second consecutive league title.

Académica qualified for their very first Supertaça by winning the 2012 Taça de Portugal Final, beating Sporting CP 1–0 in the final at the Estádio Nacional. En route to the final, Académica de Coimbra defeated teams from the Primeira Liga, Liga de Honra and the Portuguese Second Division. Académica started their cup campaign defeating Oriental, 1–0. The most notable win en route to the final saw them face their opposition of the 2012 Supertaça in the fourth round, where they defeated the Dragons, 3–0 at the Estádio Cidade de Coimbra. Following their most notable win in their cup run, they went on to defeat Leixões 5–2 and the Desportivo das Aves 3–2 in the next two rounds. The draw for the semi-finals saw them draw Oliveirense of the Liga de Honra. The semi final was contested over two legs with Académica winning the first game 1–0 and drawing the second game at the Estádio Carlos Osório 2–2. Académica would win the semi-final 3–2 on aggregate and therefore book their place in the cup final for the first time since 1969. A fourth-minute goal from Marinho in the 2012 Taça de Portugal Final saw them capture the Taça de Portugal for the first time since 1939.

=== Officials ===
The match officials for the game were confirmed on 7 August 2012. Olegário Benquerença of Leiria was named as referee. Benquerença had previously officiated the 2005 Supertaça Cândido de Oliveira between Benfica and Vitória de Setúbal at the Estádio Algarve. Aside from the Supertaça, Benquerença had also officiated two Taça de Portugal finals in 2008 between Porto and Sporting CP and in 2002 between Sporting CP and Leixões. Benquerença was assisted by João Santos of Porto and Luís Marcelino of Leiria, while the fourth official was Jorge Tavares of Aveiro.

=== Venue ===
The Portuguese Football Federation announced in June 2012, that the 2012 Supertaça Cândido de Oliveira was to take place at the Estádio Municipal de Aveiro in Aveiro. Académica's Estádio Cidade de Coimbra was also considered in contention to host the Supertaça but was not selected as a result of Académica qualifying for the competition. The Estádio Municipal de Aveiro hosted the Supertaça competition for a fourth consecutive year in a row after previously hosting the 2009, 2010 and the 2011 editions of the Supertaça. All of these four finals all consisted of Porto winning the competition.

The Estádio Municipal de Aveiro is the home stadium of Beira-Mar. It holds a capacity for 30,127 spectators. The stadium was built in 2003 and replaced the Estádio Mário Duarte which was Beira-Mar's home stadium from 1930 until 2003. The stadium was used for two games at UEFA Euro 2004.

== Match ==
=== Team selection ===
Porto went into the 2012 Supertaça Cândido de Oliveira with several players who were doubtful due to injury as well as players missing due to other commitments. In the weeks building up to the match, Porto had several players who were doubtful for the game but fully recuperated for the match. This was the case for Eliaquim Mangala and Marc Janko. Newly acquired forward Jackson Martínez was included in the squad after receiving international clearance for him to join Porto from Mexican team Chiapas. Porto's Alex Sandro, Danilo and Hulk missed the Supertaça due to being a part of the Brazilian national under-23 team who were participating in the 2012 Summer Olympics in London.

Vítor Pereira's squad selection for the match saw him leave out Argentine midfielder Juan Iturbe and centre forward Marc Janko despite being recovered from an injury. Pereira's selection also saw him leave out Álvaro Pereira, who was on the verge of signing for Inter Milan. Pereira's squad selection for the Supertaça saw him include two newly acquired players; Fabiano and Jackson Martínez. Porto's starting line-up would see Miguel Lopes and Eliaquim Mangala start the game in the full back positions after first-team regulars Alex Sandro and Danilo were unavailable for the game. The surprise choices in the starting line up saw Steven Defour start over João Moutinho and Christian Atsu start over Silvestre Varela.

Académica went into the 2012 Supertaça Cândido de Oliveira with no injuries to any of its players. Pedro Emanuel selected a squad of 19 players for the Supertaça. His squad selection for the Supertaça saw him include ten newly acquired players: Afonso, Bruno China, Cleyton, Edinho, Henrique, John Ogu, Magique, Makelele, Rodrigo Galo and Salim Cissé. Of those ten, Afonso, Cleyton, Makelele, Galo and Cissé would start the game. Ogu and Magique were later used in the game as substitutes. The surprise choice in Pedro Emanuel's starting eleven saw first-team goalkeeper Romuald Peiser be replaced by Ricardo.

=== Summary ===
Porto dominated possession early on and created several chances which tested Académica's defense. The first major chance of the game saw Miguel Lopes receive the ball inside the eighteen yard box and pass it to James Rodríguez who fired the ball into Ricardo's hands. Porto's dominance continued with Maicon's free kick being parried by Ricardo and on the follow-up, Ricardo blocked Christian Atsu's shot. The first half would remain goalless. Porto entered into the second half dominating possession just like they did in the first half. The first major goal scoring chance of the second half saw Lucho González play the ball into Académica's penalty box where Jackson Martínez couldn't capitalize off Académica's defense frailties when he shot the ball over the bar. As the score remained goalless, Vítor Pereira brought on Djalma and João Moutinho. Pereira's substitutions were paying off, as Porto started to create more chances and provide more attacking threat. Porto's next major threat on goal saw Nicolás Otamendi's bicycle kick be saved by Ricardo from a resulting James Rodríguez corner kick. As the game drew closer to the end, it seemed that the Supertaça would be settled on overtime but in the ninetieth minute of the game, a right wing cross found Jackson Martínez in the box who headed the ball past Ricardo to grant Porto a nineteenth Supertaça.

=== Details ===
11 August 2012
20:45 UTC

Porto	1–0	Académica
Martínez 90'	Report

Estádio Municipal de Aveiro, Aveiro
Attendance: 26,825
Referee: Olegário Benquerença

Porto	Académica

GK	1	(Brazil) Helton
RB	13	(Portugal) Miguel Lopes
CB	4	(Brazil) Maicon
CB	30	(Argentina) Nicolás Otamendi	(yellow card) 88'
LB	22	(France) Eliaquim Mangala
DM	25	(Brazil) Fernando
CM	3	(Argentina) Lucho González (c)		(substituted off) 86'
CM	35	(Belgium) Steven Defour	(yellow card) 53'	(substituted off) 57'
RW	10	(Colombia) James Rodríguez
LW	27	(Ghana) Christian Atsu		(substituted off) 57'
CF	9	(Colombia) Jackson Martínez	(yellow card) 90+1'
Substitutes:
GK	24	(Brazil) Fabiano
DF	14	(Portugal) Rolando
MF	6	(Portugal) André Castro
MF	8	(Portugal) João Moutinho		(substituted on) 57'
FW	20	(Angola) Djalma		(substituted on) 57'
FW	17	(Portugal) Silvestre Varela		(substituted on) 86'
FW	11	(Brazil) Kléber
Manager:
(Portugal) Vítor Pereira

GK	12	(Portugal) Ricardo
RB	22	(Brazil) Rodrigo Galo
CB	35	(Brazil) Reiner
CB	13	(Portugal) João Real
LB	55	(Portugal) Hélder Cabral	(yellow card) 60'
DM	4	(Portugal) Flávio Ferreira (c)
CM	8	(Brazil) Makelele
CM	20	(Brazil) Cleyton
RW	7	(Portugal) Marinho		(substituted off) 87'
LW	77	(Brazil) Afonso		(substituted off) 71'
CF	92	(Guinea) Salim Cissé
Substitutes:
GK	1	(France) Romuald Peiser
DF	2	(Portugal) João Dias
DF	23	(Portugal) Henrique
MF	14	(Portugal) Bruno China
MF	18	(Ivory Coast) Magique		(substituted on) 87'
FW	30	(Nigeria) John Ogu		(substituted on) 71'
FW	36	(Portugal) Edinho
Manager:
(Portugal) Pedro Emanuel

2012 Supertaça Cândido de Oliveira Winners
Porto
19th Title

Man of the match

- (Colombia) Jackson Martínez (Porto)

Match officials

- Assistant referees:
  - João Santos (Porto)
  - Luís Marcelino (Leiria)
- Fourth official: Jorge Tavares (Aveiro)

Match rules

- 90 minutes
- Penalty shoot-out if scores level after 90 minutes
- Seven named substitutes
- Maximum of three substitutions

== See also ==
- 2012–13 Primeira Liga
- 2012–13 Taça de Portugal
- 2012–13 Taça da Liga
- 2012–13 FC Porto season
