= 2012–13 FC Porto season =

Porto
2012–13 season
- President: Jorge Nuno Pinto da Costa
- Manager: Vítor Pereira
- Stadium: Estádio do Dragão
- Primeira Liga: 1st
- Taça de Portugal: Fifth round
- Taça da Liga: Runners-up
- Supertaça Cândido de Oliveira: Winners
- UEFA Champions League: Round of 16
- Top goalscorer: League: Jackson Martínez (26); All: Jackson Martínez (31)
Home colours	Away colours	Third colours

The 2012–13 FC Porto season in Primeira Liga.

== Competitions ==
=== Legend ===
Win Draw Loss

=== Supertaça Cândido de Oliveira ===
11 August 2012	Porto	1–0	Académica	Aveiro
21:45	Defour (yellow card) 53'; Otamendi (yellow card) 88'; Martínez 90', (yellow card) 90'	Report	Cabral (yellow card) 61'	Stadium: Estádio Municipal de Aveiro; Attendance: 26,000; Referee: Olegário Benquerença

=== Primeira Liga ===
==== League table ====
Pos	Team	Pld	W	D	L	GF	GA	GD	Pts	Qualification or relegation
1	Porto (C)	30	24	6	0	70	14	+56	78	Qualification for the Champions League group stage
2	Benfica	30	24	5	1	77	20	+57	77	Qualification for the Champions League group stage
3	Paços de Ferreira	30	14	12	4	42	29	+13	54	Qualification for the Champions League play-off round
4	Braga	30	16	4	10	60	44	+16	52	Qualification for the Europa League play-off round
5	Estoril	30	13	6	11	47	37	+10	45	Qualification for the Europa League third qualifying round

Source: LPFP (in Portuguese)
Rules for classification: 1) Points; 2) Head-to-head points; 3) Head-to-head goal difference; 4) Head-to-head away goals scored; 5) Goal difference; 6) Matches won; 7) Goals scored; 8) Play-off.
(Note: LPFP decided that only criteria 1, 5, 6 and 7 would be applied to establish the classification during the competition.)
(C) Champions

==== Matches ====
19 August 2012 1	Gil Vicente	0–0	Porto	Barcelos
17:15 GMT	João Pedro (yellow card) 38'; Facchini (yellow card) 88'; Halisson (yellow card) 90+6'	Report	Mangala (yellow card) 47'; González (yellow card) 70'; Rodríguez (yellow card) 72'	Stadium: Estádio Cidade de Barcelos; Attendance: 8,298; Referee: Duarte Gomes

25 August 2012 2	Porto	4–0	Vitória de Guimarães	Porto
20:15 GMT	González 15', 71'; Hulk 66'; Martínez 80' (pen.)	Report	Defendi (yellow card) 79'; Olímpio (yellow card) 90+1'	Stadium: Estádio do Dragão; Attendance: 43,913; Referee: Hugo Miguel

1 September 2012 3	Olhanense	2–3	Porto	Olhão
19:30 GMT	Abdi 13', (yellow card) 27'; Alexandre (yellow card) 20'; Targino 86'	Report	Alex Sandro (yellow card) 14'; Rodríguez 43'; Martínez 49'; Hulk 72'	Stadium: Estádio José Arcanjo; Attendance: 9,498; Referee: João Ferreira dos Santos

22 September 2012 4	Porto	4–0	Beira-Mar	Porto
19:30 GMT	Martínez 32'; Varela 37'; Rodríguez 47'; Maicon 71'; Mangala (yellow card) 82'	Report	Sasso (yellow card) 80'	Stadium: Estádio do Dragão; Attendance: 28,609; Referee: Manuel Mota

29 September 2012 5	Rio Ave	2–2	Porto	Vila do Conde
19:30 GMT	Wíres (yellow card) 12'; Braga (yellow card) 67'; Tarantini 78', 85', (yellow card) 90+2'	Report	Lopes 32'; Varela (yellow card) 70'; Martínez 89'	Stadium: Estádio do Rio Ave FC; Attendance: 3,341; Referee: Bruno Alexandre da Silva Esteves

7 October 2012 6	Porto	2–0	Sporting CP	Porto
19:45 GMT	Martínez 9'; González (yellow card) 24'; Rodríguez (yellow card) 26', (goal) 83' (pen.); Fernando (yellow card) 40'; Alex Sandro (yellow card) 79'	Report	Schaars (yellow card) 34'; Carrillo (yellow card) 40'; Izmaylov (yellow card) 51'; Pranjić (yellow card) 66'; Silva (yellow card) 66'; Rojo (yellow card) 70' (yellow-red card) 72'; Elias (yellow card) 82'; Boulahrouz (yellow card) 83'; Van Wolfswinkel (yellow card) 88'	Stadium: Estádio do Dragão; Attendance: 38,909; Referee: Manuel Jorge Neves Moreira de Sousa

28 October 2012 7	Estoril	1–2	Porto	Estoril
20:15 GMT	Vitória 9'	Report	Varela 56'; Martínez 60'; Fernando (yellow card) 68'	Stadium: Estádio António Coimbra da Mota; Attendance: 4,934; Referee: João Capela

2 November 2012 8	Porto	5–0	Marítimo	Porto
20:15 GMT	Martínez 4', 59'; Varela 35'; Otamendi (yellow card) 63'; Rodríguez 72', 77'	Report	Roberge (yellow card) 54'; João Luiz (yellow card) 67'; Dias (yellow card) 83'	Stadium: Estádio do Dragão; Attendance: 27,609; Referee: Cosme Machado

11 November 2012 9	Porto	2–1	Académica	Porto
18:00 GMT	Rodríguez 50'; Moutinho 62'; Ba (yellow card) 75'	Report	Reiner (yellow card) 77'; Eduardo 79'; Ogu (yellow card) 83'	Stadium: Estádio do Dragão; Attendance: 31,910; Referee: Hugo Rodrigues Pacheco

25 November 2012 10	Braga	0–2	Porto	Braga
20:15 GMT	Custódio (yellow card) 52'; Salino (yellow card) 88'	Report	Fernando (yellow card) 39'; Varela (yellow card) 62'; Rodríguez 90'; Martínez 90'; Helton (yellow card) 90+2'	Stadium: Estádio Municipal de Braga; Attendance: 17,251; Referee: Carlos Xistra

8 December 2012 11	Porto	1–0	Moreirense	Porto
20:30 GMT	Alex Sandro (yellow card) 63'; Martínez 71'; Mangala (yellow card) 77'	Report	Gonçalves (yellow card) 52'; Espinho (yellow card) 85'	Stadium: Estádio do Dragão; Attendance: 24,610; Referee: Vasco Santos

23 January 2013 12	Vitória de Setúbal	0–3	Porto	Setúbal
20:15 GMT	Santos (yellow card) 8'; Jorginho (yellow card) 31' (yellow-red card) 84'; Cristiano (yellow card) 64'; Gallo (yellow card) 76' (yellow-red card) 78'	Report	Martínez 8', 86'; Moutinho (yellow card) 32'; González 90+1'	Stadium: Estádio do Bonfim; Attendance: 2,828; Referee: Pedro Proença (Lisbon)

5 January 2013 13	Porto	1–0	Nacional	Porto
20:30 GMT	Martínez 23'; Fernando (yellow card) 90+1'	Report	Moreno (yellow card) 54'; Mexer (yellow card) 74'; Aurélio (yellow card) 88'	Stadium: Estádio do Dragão; Attendance: 27,109; Referee: Rui Costa (Porto)

13 January 2013 14	Benfica	2–2	Porto	Lisbon
20:15 GMT	Matić 10', (yellow card) 63'; Gaitán 20'; Pérez (yellow card) 47'; Pereira (yellow card) 85'	Report	Mangala 8'; Martínez 15'; Moutinho (yellow card) 82'	Stadium: Estádio da Luz; Attendance: 60,556; Referee: João Ferreira (Setúbal)

19 January 2013 15	Porto	2–0	Paços de Ferreira	Porto
20:15 GMT	Alex Sandro (yellow card) 16', (goal) 47'; Izmaylov 78'; Fernando (yellow card) 85'	Report	Luiz Carlos (yellow card) 41'; Leão (yellow card) 71'; Josué (yellow card) 89'	Stadium: Estádio do Dragão; Attendance: 22,703; Referee: Jorge Sousa (Porto)

28 January 2013 16	Porto	5–0	Gil Vicente	Porto
20:00 GMT	Danilo 4'; Vinha 11' (o.g.); Mangala (yellow card) 43'; Defour 54'; Varela 74'; Martínez 89'	Report	Cláudio (yellow card) 47' (yellow-red card) 61'	Stadium: Estádio do Dragão; Attendance: 24,202; Referee: Paulo Baptista (Portalegre

2 February 2013 17	Vitória de Guimarães	0–4	Porto	Guimarães
20:30 GMT	Alex (yellow card) 35'; Barrientos (yellow card) 44'	Report	Varela (yellow card) 9'; Mangala 14'; Martínez 36', 55', 72'; Otamendi (yellow card) 65'	Stadium: Estádio D. Afonso Henriques; Attendance: 17,244; Referee: Marco Ferreira (Madeira)

10 February 2013 18	Porto	1–1	Olhanense	Porto
20:15 GMT	Martínez 54'; Fernando (yellow card) 72'	Report	Targino 6', (yellow card) 80'; Jander (yellow card) 64'; Piloto (yellow card) 78'; Duarte (yellow card) 83'; Lucas (yellow card) 83'	Stadium: Estádio do Dragão; Attendance: 26,809; Referee: Cosme Machado (Braga)

15 February 2013 19	Beira-Mar	0–2	Porto	Aveiro
20:30 GMT	Lopes (yellow card) 27'; Vieira (yellow card) 51'	Report	Mangala (yellow card) 31' (yellow-red card) 88'; Atsu 34'; Alex Sandro (yellow card) 45'; Martínez 73'	Stadium: Estádio Municipal de Aveiro; Attendance: 6,524; Referee: Carlos Xistra

23 February 2013 20	Porto	2–1	Rio Ave	Porto
20:15 GMT	Martínez 45', 76'	Report	Braga 38'; Marcelo (yellow card) 45'; Tope (yellow card) 68'; Ukra (yellow card) 80'; Wíres (yellow card) 90'	Stadium: Estádio do Dragão; Attendance: 27,859; Referee: Artur Soares Dias

2 March 2013 21	Sporting CP	0–0	Porto	Lisbon
19:45 GMT	Rojo (yellow card) 44' (yellow-red card) 77'; Carrillo (yellow card) 81'; Lopes (yellow card) 89'; Bruma (yellow card) 90+1'	Report	Izmaylov (yellow card) 37'; Maicon (yellow card) 81'; Fernando (yellow card) 86'	Stadium: Estádio José Alvalade; Attendance: 27,436; Referee: Paulo Baptista

8 March 2013 22	Porto	2–0	Estoril	Porto
20:00 GMT	Maicon 4'; Martínez 14'	Report	Leal (yellow card) 90+2'	Stadium: Estádio do Dragão; Attendance: 24,604; Referee: Nuno Almeida

17 March 2013 23	Marítimo	1–1	Porto	Funchal
18:00 GMT	Suk 38'; Héldon (yellow card) 63'; Ferreira (yellow card) 83'	Report	Alex Sandro (yellow card) 27'; Rodríguez 34', (yellow card) 80'; Otamendi (yellow card) 36'; González (yellow card) 42'; Danilo (yellow card) 79'	Stadium: Estádio dos Barreiros; Attendance: 4,433; Referee: João Capela

30 March 2013 24	Académica	0–3	Porto	Coimbra
18:15 GMT	Bruno China (yellow card) 23'	Report	Mangala 15', (yellow card) 15'; Danilo 52'; Otamendi (yellow card) 62'; Moutinho (yellow card) 87'; Castro 89'	Stadium: Estádio Cidade de Coimbra; Attendance: 5,832; Referee: Bruno Esteves

8 April 2013 25	Porto	3–1	Braga	Porto
20:00 GMT	Rodríguez 37'; Kelvin 83', 86'	Report	Alan 23'; Quim (yellow card) 67'	Stadium: Estádio do Dragão; Attendance: 31,210; Referee: Pedro Proença

20 April 2013 26	Moreirense	0–3	Porto	Moreira de Cónegos
20:30 GMT		Report	Martínez 33', 55'; Fernando 51' (pen.)	Stadium: Parque Joaquim de Almeida Freitas; Attendance: 3,692; Referee: Marco Ferreira

27 April 2013 27	Porto	2–0	Vitória de Setúbal	Porto
20:30 GMT	Atsu (yellow card) 33'; González 64'; Defour 87'	Report	Pedro (yellow card) 32'; Santos (yellow card) 37'; Tavares (yellow card) 77'; Kiko (yellow card) 80'; Jorginho (yellow card) 84'	Stadium: Estádio do Dragão; Attendance: 32,410; Referee: Carlos Xistra

4 May 2013 28	Nacional	1–3	Porto	Funchal
20:30 GMT	Candeias 26', (yellow card) 30'; Keita (yellow card) 89'	Report	Rodríguez 9'; Mangala 20', (yellow card) 26'; González 22'; Fernando (yellow card) 52'; Helton (yellow card) 71'; Izmaylov (yellow card) 90+1'	Stadium: Estádio da Madeira; Attendance: 3,872; Referee: Cosme Machado

11 May 2013 29	Porto	2–1	Benfica	Porto
20:30 GMT	Varela 24'; Rodríguez (yellow card) 56'; Fernando (yellow card) 66'; Defour (yellow card) 80'; Kelvin 90'; Helton (yellow card) 90+3'	Report	Lima 18'; Pérez (yellow card) 46'; Matić (yellow card) 59'; Artur (yellow card) 85'	Stadium: Estádio do Dragão; Attendance: 50,117; Referee: Pedro Proença

19 May 2013 30	Paços de Ferreira	0–2	Porto	Paços de Ferreira
16:00 GMT	Ricardo (red card) 22'; Leão (yellow card) 78'	Report	Danilo (yellow card) 17' (yellow-red card) 57'; González 23'; Martínez 51'	Stadium: Estádio da Mata Real; Attendance: 4,928; Referee: Hugo Miguel

=== Taça de Portugal ===
20 October 2012 Third round	Santa Eulália	0–1	Porto	Vizela
15:30		Summary	Danilo 31'	Stadium: Campo Municipal de Santa Eulália; Referee: Rui Costa

17 November 2012 Fourth round	Nacional	0–3	Porto	Funchal
21:15	Da Costa (yellow card) 30'; Claudemir (yellow card) 38'; Mexer (yellow card) 61'; Revson (yellow card) 67'; Marçal (yellow card) 80'	Summary	Mangala (yellow card) 25', (goal) 72'; González 28'; Atsu (yellow card) 62'; Kléber 89'	Stadium: Estádio da Madeira; Attendance: 1,500; Referee: Paulo Baptista

30 November 2012 Fifth round	Braga	2–1	Porto	Braga
21:15	Custódio (yellow card) 66'; Mossoró (yellow card) 68'; Danilo 74' (o.g.); Rúben Micael (yellow card) 76'; Eder 79'	Summary	Mangala 13', (yellow card) 90'; Castro (yellow card) 18' (yellow-red card) 72'; Otamendi (yellow card) 64'; González (yellow card) 74'; Kléber (yellow card) 86'	Stadium: Estádio Municipal de Braga; Attendance: 9,070; Referee: Olegário Benquerença

=== Taça da Liga ===
==== Group stage ====
Group A
Team	Pld	W	D	L	GF	GA	GD	Pts
Porto	3	2	1	0	5	2	+3	7
Vitória de Setúbal	3	1	1	1	3	2	+1	4
Nacional	3	1	0	2	2	5	–3	3
Estoril	3	0	2	1	2	3	–1	2

19 December 2012 1	Nacional	0–2	Porto	Funchal
19:00		Summary	González 32'; Otamendi 50'	Stadium: Estádio da Madeira; Attendance: 1,437; Referee: Bruno Esteves

30 December 2012 2	Estoril	2–2	Porto	Estoril
19:15	Vitória 15', 61' (pen.), (yellow card) 57'; Coimbra (yellow card) 65'; Matos (yellow card) 74'	Summary	Martínez 31'; Danilo (yellow card) 59'; Fernando (yellow card) 60'; González (yellow card) 70'; Moutinho 89', (yellow card) 90+3'	Stadium: Estádio António Coimbra da Mota; Attendance: 3,257; Referee: Jorge Ferreira

9 January 2013 3	Porto	1–0	Vitória de Setúbal	Porto
18:30	Kelvin (yellow card) 31'; Mangala (yellow card) 37'; Moutinho 44' (pen.)	Summary	Cristiano (yellow card) 63'; Santos (yellow card) 83'; Queirós (yellow card) 85'; Tavares (yellow card) 90+3'	Stadium: Estádio do Dragão; Attendance: 12,808; Referee: João Capela

==== Knockout phase ====
3 April 2013 Semi-finals	Porto	4–0	Rio Ave	Porto
17:45	Rodríguez 57' (pen.); Fernando 72'; Defour 83'; Izmaylov (red card) 90+2'; Mangala 90+4'	Summary	Oblak (red card) 54'; Lionn (yellow card) 90+2'; Nivaldo (yellow card) 90+3'	Stadium: Estádio do Dragão; Attendance: 12,509; Referee: Hugo Filipe Ferreira de Campos Moreira Miguel

13 April 2013 Final	Braga	1–0	Porto	Coimbra
20:45	Echiéjilé (yellow card) 36'; Alan 45+2' (pen.); Baiano (yellow card) 48'; Mossoró (yellow card) 67'; Custódio (yellow card) 80'; Quim (yellow card) 90+4'	Summary	Ba (yellow card) 17' (yellow-red card) 45'	Stadium: Estádio Cidade de Coimbra; Attendance: 18,519; Referee: João Carlos Santos Capela

=== UEFA Champions League ===
==== Group stage ====
Group A
Team	Pld	W	D	L	GF	GA	GD	Pts
(France) Paris Saint-Germain	6	5	0	1	14	3	+11	15
(Portugal) Porto	6	4	1	1	10	4	+6	13
(Ukraine) Dynamo Kyiv	6	1	2	3	6	10	−4	5
(Croatia) Dinamo Zagreb	6	0	1	5	1	14	−13	1

18 September 2012 1	Dinamo Zagreb (Croatia)	0–2	(Portugal) Porto	Zagreb, Croatia
20:45 CEST (UTC+02:00)		Report	González 41'; Defour 90+2'	Stadium: Stadion Maksimir; Attendance: 4,683; Referee: Daniele Orsato (Italy)

3 October 2012 2	Porto (Portugal)	1–0	(France) Paris Saint-Germain	Porto, Portugal
20:45 CEST (UTC+02:00)	Rodríguez 83'	Report		Stadium: Estádio do Dragão; Attendance: 36,509; Referee: Howard Webb (England)

24 October 2012 3	Porto (Portugal)	3–2	(Ukraine) Dynamo Kyiv	Porto, Portugal
20:45 CEST (UTC+02:00)	Varela 15'; Martínez 36', 78'	Report	Husyev 21'; Ideye 72'	Stadium: Estádio do Dragão; Attendance: 29,317; Referee: Pavel Královec (Czech Republic)

6 November 2012 4	Dynamo Kyiv (Ukraine)	0–0	(Portugal) Porto	Kyiv, Ukraine
20:45 CET (UTC+01:00)		Report		Stadium: Olympic Stadium; Attendance: 34,386; Referee: Alberto Undiano Mallenco (Spain)

21 November 2012 5	Porto (Portugal)	3–0	(Croatia) Dinamo Zagreb	Porto, Portugal
20:45 CET (UTC+01:00)	González 20'; Moutinho 67'; Varela 85'	Report		Stadium: Estádio do Dragão; Attendance: 27,603; Referee: Paolo Tagliavento (Italy)

4 December 2012 6	Paris Saint-Germain (France)	2–1	(Portugal) Porto	Paris, France
20:45 CET (UTC+01:00)	Silva 29'; Lavezzi 61'	Report	Martínez 33'	Stadium: Parc des Princes; Attendance: 45,512; Referee: Craig Thomson (Scotland)

==== Knockout phase ====
===== Round of 16 =====
19 February 2013 First leg	Porto (Portugal)	1–0	(Spain) Málaga	Porto, Portugal
20:45 CET (UTC+01:00)	Moutinho 56'	Report	Iturra (yellow card) 75'	Stadium: Estádio do Dragão; Attendance: 42,209; Referee: Mark Clattenburg (England)

13 March 2013 Second leg	Málaga (Spain)	2–0 (2–1 agg.)	(Portugal) Porto	Málaga, Spain
20:45 CET (UTC+01:00)	Demichelis (yellow card) 28'; Gámez (yellow card) 33'; Isco 43'; Toulalan (yellow card) 64'; Santa Cruz 77'	Report	Otamendi (yellow card) 17'; Defour (yellow card) 24' (yellow-red card) 49'; Alex Sandro (yellow card) 30'; Mangala (yellow card) 83'	Stadium: La Rosaleda; Attendance: 29,500; Referee: Nicola Rizzoli (Italy)

=== Overall record by competition ===
As of 19 April 2013

Competition	First match	Last match	Record								
Competition	First match	Last match	G	W	D	L	GF	GA	GD	Win %	Source
Primeira Liga	19 August 2012	19 May 2013	30	24	6	0	70	14	+56	80.00	
Taça de Portugal	20 October 2012	30 November 2012	3	2	0	1	5	2	+3	66.67	
Taça da Liga			5	3	1	1	9	3	+6	60.00	
Supertaça Cândido de Oliveira	11 August 2012		1	1	0	0	1	0	+1	100.00	
Champions League	18 September 2012	13 March 2013	8	5	1	2	11	6	+5	62.50	
Total			46	34	8	4	88	24	+64	73.91	

== Squad ==
=== Current squad ===
Note: Flags indicate national team as defined under FIFA eligibility rules; some limited exceptions apply. Players may hold more than one non-FIFA nationality.

No.	Pos.	Nation	Player
1	GK	BRA	Helton
2	DF	BRA	Danilo
3	MF	ARG	Lucho González (captain)
4	DF	BRA	Maicon
5	DF	COL	Héctor Quiñones
6	MF	POR	André Castro
8	MF	POR	João Moutinho
9	FW	COL	Jackson Martínez
10	FW	COL	James Rodríguez
15	MF	RUS	Marat Izmaylov
17	FW	POR	Silvestre Varela

No.	Pos.	Nation	Player
19	FW	POR	Liédson (on loan from Flamengo)
22	DF	FRA	Eliaquim Mangala
23	DF	SEN	Abdoulaye Ba
24	GK	BRA	Fabiano
25	MF	BRA	Fernando
26	DF	BRA	Alex Sandro
27	MF	GHA	Christian Atsu
28	FW	BRA	Kelvin
30	DF	ARG	Nicolás Otamendi
35	MF	BEL	Steven Defour
41	GK	ANG	Kadú

== Squad changes in 2012–13 ==
=== Signings ===
Note: Flags indicate national team as defined under FIFA eligibility rules; some limited exceptions apply. Players may hold more than one non-FIFA nationality.

No.	Pos.	Nation	Player
—	DF	MEX	Diego Reyes (from América – €7,200,000)
—	MF	RUS	Marat Izmaylov (from Sporting CP – rights of Miguel Lopes)
—	FW	PAR	Mauro Caballero (from Libertad – €365,000)

=== Departures ===
Note: Flags indicate national team as defined under FIFA eligibility rules; some limited exceptions apply. Players may hold more than one non-FIFA nationality.

No.	Pos.	Nation	Player
—	GK	POR	Hugo Ventura (to Sporting CP – Nominal fee)
—	DF	POR	Miguel Lopes (to Sporting CP – rights of Marat Izmaylov)
—	DF	POR	Emídio Rafael (to Braga – Nominal fee)

No.	Pos.	Nation	Player
—	DF	URU	Jorge Fucile (End of contract)
—	MF	BRA	Souza (to Grêmio – €3,200,000)
—	FW	BRA	Hulk (to Zenit – €60,000,000)

=== Out on loan ===
Note: Flags indicate national team as defined under FIFA eligibility rules; some limited exceptions apply. Players may hold more than one non-FIFA nationality.

No.	Pos.	Nation	Player
–	GK	BRA	Rafael Bracalli (to Olhanense)
–	DF	POR	Henrique Sereno (to Valladolid)
–	DF	POR	Rolando (to Napoli)
–	FW	POR	Ukra (to Rio Ave)

No.	Pos.	Nation	Player
–	FW	ANG	Djalma (to Kasımpaşa)
–	FW	ARG	Juan Iturbe (to River Plate)
–	FW	BRA	Kléber (to Palmeiras)

== See also ==
- List of unbeaten football club seasons
