= 2013 Supertaça Cândido de Oliveira =

- Event: Supertaça Cândido de Oliveira (Portuguese Super Cup)
Porto	Vitória de Guimarães
3	0
- Date: 10 August 2013
- Venue: Estádio Municipal de Aveiro, Aveiro
- Man of the Match: Lucho González (Porto)
- Referee: Artur Soares Dias (Porto)
- Attendance: 29,100

The 2013 Supertaça Cândido de Oliveira was the 35th edition of the Supertaça Cândido de Oliveira, the annual Portuguese football season-opening match contested by the winners of the previous season's top league and cup competitions (or cup runner-up in case the league- and cup-winning club is the same). It took place on 10 August 2013 at the Estádio Municipal de Aveiro in Aveiro, and was contested between Porto, the 2012–13 Primeira Liga winners, and Vitória de Guimarães, the 2012–13 Taça de Portugal winners.

Played in front of a crowd of 29,100, the Dragões defeated the Vimaranenses 3–0. A fifth-minute goal from newly acquired winger Licá, a headed goal from Colombian centre forward Jackson Martínez on 17 minutes and a volleyed strike before the end of the first half by Argentine midfielder Lucho González saw Porto defeat the opposition comfortably and thus raise the club's tally to 20 trophies in this competition (57.1% of wins).

== Background ==
2013 was Porto's 29th appearance in the Supertaça Cândido de Oliveira and eighth consecutive presence since 2006. They entered the match as the record 19-time winners (1981, 1983, 1984, 1986, 1990, 1991, 1993, 1994, 1996, 1998, 1999, 2001, 2003, 2004, 2006, 2009, 2010, 2011, 2012). In 2012, they defeated the 2011–12 Taça de Portugal holders Académica de Coimbra 1–0.

It was the third Supertaca appearance for Vitória de Guimarães and first since 2011, when they lost 2–1 against Porto.

The two teams had previously met on 153 different occasions, with Porto leading the series with a 97-22-34 record. Before the Supertaça, the last meeting between both sides was in the domestic league on 2 February 2013, with the Dragões defeating the Vimaranenses 4–0 at the Estádio D. Afonso Henriques. A hat-trick from Colombian centre-forward Jackson Martínez and a header from Eliaquim Mangala provided Porto with the three points.

== Pre-match ==
=== Broadcasting ===
RTP broadcast the Supertaça on TV and Radio (RTP1 and Antena 1) for the third consecutive year. As it happened in previous years, a HD broadcast was available on 1080i resolution on RTP HD, which was available on most Pay-TV providers at that time.

=== Entry ===
Porto qualified for the 2013 Supertaça Cândido de Oliveira by winning the 2012–13 Primeira Liga. The Primeira Liga title was primarily contested between Porto and Benfica. Three games from the end of the season, Benfica had a four-point advantage over the Dragões. The next fixture saw Benfica drop two points at home to Estoril, while Porto picked up three points away to Nacional which would close the gap to two points and allow the title decision to be resolved in the Clássico game at the Estádio do Dragão. In a must-win game, Porto's Kelvin scored a dramatic injury time goal which claimed all three points and put Porto one point ahead of their rivals with one game to go. Kelvin's late winner would mark the first time Benfica would suffer a loss in the 2012–13 Primeira Liga campaign. Porto won their final league game away to Paços de Ferreira, with goals from Lucho González and Jackson Martínez which claimed the league title for a third consecutive season, which was their 27th overall.

Vitória de Guimarães qualified for the Supertaça by winning the 2012–13 Taça de Portugal for the first time in the club's history. The Guimarães outfit progressed through six rounds to reach the final for a second time in three seasons. Their first cup tie saw them easily defeat lower league opposition Vilaverdense 6–1, with braces from Hillal Soudani, Marcelo Toscano and Ricardo Pereira. The next two rounds saw Primeira Liga opposition and two consecutive penalty shootouts for the Conquistadores. After two successful cup ties which were won on penalties, the quarter-finals saw rivals Braga stand in their way. Vitória de Guimarães won the tie 2–1 after a third consecutive game which went to extra-time. Uruguayan midfielder Jean Barrientos scored both goals to allow his side to progress to the semi-finals. For the semi-finals which were contested over two legs, they were drawn against Belenenses, who at the time was the lowest-ranked side in the competition. Vitória de Guimarães won both ties (3–0 on aggregate) to progress to the final. In the cup final, Benfica were the opponents. The match was primarily dominated by the Encarnados from the start, with Benfica scoring first with a first-half Nicolás Gaitán goal. In the second half, the match looked destined to be won by Benfica but a quick attack play and a goalkeeping blunder by Benfica's Artur would see two goals in two minutes near the end of the game in which the underdogs would hold on for their first cup triumph after five previously failed attempts.

=== Officials ===
Artur Soares Dias of Porto was named as referee for the match on the 8 August. For the Supertaça, Soares Dias was assisted by Rui Tavares and João Silva of Porto, while the fourth official was Rui Silva of Vila Real.

=== Ticketing ===
Tickets for the Supertaça went on sale on the 22 July. The FPF allocated tickets for both finalist clubs with prices for the game varying between €5 and €15.

=== Venue ===
The Portuguese Football Federation (FPF) announced in June 2013, that the 2013 Supertaça Cândido de Oliveira was to take place at the Estádio Municipal de Aveiro in Aveiro. The Estádio Municipal de Aveiro hosted the Supertaça competition for a fifth consecutive year in a row after previously hosting the 2009, 2010, 2011 and the 2012 editions. All of these four finals all consisted of Porto winning the competition.

The Estádio Municipal de Aveiro is the home stadium of Beira-Mar. It holds a capacity for 30,127 spectators. The stadium was built in 2003 and replaced the Estádio Mário Duarte which was Beira-Mar's home stadium from 1930 until 2003. The stadium was used for two games at UEFA Euro 2004.

== Match ==
=== Team selection ===
The Vimaranenses went into the Supertaça without newly acquired striker Moussa Maâzou. Vitória's Maâzou was missing due to holding talks with FIFA over disputes concerning unpaid wages by his former club Étoile du Sahel.

=== Details ===
10 August 2013
20:45 WEST

Porto	3–0	Vitória de Guimarães
Licá 5'; Martínez 17'; González 45'	Report

Estádio Municipal de Aveiro, Aveiro
Attendance: 29,100
Referee: Artur Soares Dias (Porto)

Porto	Vitória SC

GK	1	(Brazil) Helton
RB	5	(Uruguay) Jorge Fucile
CB	22	(France) Eliaquim Mangala
CB	30	(Argentina) Nicolás Otamendi
LB	26	(Brazil) Alex Sandro
DM	25	(Brazil) Fernando
CM	3	(Argentina) Lucho González (c)
CM	35	(Belgium) Steven Defour	(substituted off) 76'
RW	17	(Portugal) Silvestre Varela	(substituted off) 63'
LW	19	(Portugal) Licá	(substituted off) 87'
CF	9	(Colombia) Jackson Martínez
Substitutes:
GK	24	(Brazil) Fabiano
DF	4	(Brazil) Maicon
MF	8	(Portugal) Josué	(substituted in) 63'
MF	16	(Mexico) Héctor Herrera
MF	10	(Colombia) Juan Fernando Quintero	(substituted in) 76'
FW	11	(Algeria) Nabil Ghilas
FW	28	(Brazil) Kelvin	(substituted in) 87'
Manager:
(Portugal) Paulo Fonseca

GK	1	(Brazil) Douglas (c)
RB	23	(Portugal) Pedro Correia
CB	3	(Portugal) Josué
CB	15	(Portugal) Paulo Oliveira
LB	30	(Ghana) David Addy
DM	6	(Portugal) Moreno	(yellow card) 81'
DM	11	(Portugal) André André		(substituted off) 76'
AM	50	(Brazil) Rafael Crivellaro		(substituted off) 46'
RW	7	(Portugal) Marco Matias
LW	10	(Uruguay) Jean Barrientos
CF	22	(Portugal) Tómané		(substituted off) 46'
Substitutes:
GK	13	(Brazil) Assis
DF	2	(Brazil) Freire
DF	5	(Portugal) Luís Rocha
MF	17	(Portugal) Hernâni
MF	18	(Brazil) Leonel Olímpio		(substituted in) 46'
FW	19	(Cape Verde) Ricardo Gomes		(substituted in) 76'
FW	22	(Niger) Moussa Maâzou		(substituted in) 46'
Manager:
(Portugal) Rui Vitória

Man of the match

- (Argentina) Lucho González (Porto)

Match officials

- Assistant referees:
  - Rui Tavares (Porto)
  - João Silva (Porto)
- Fourth official: Rui Silva (Vila Real)

Match rules

- 90 minutes
- Penalty shoot-out if scores level after 90 minutes
- Seven named substitutes
- Maximum of three substitutions

== See also ==
- 2013–14 Primeira Liga
- 2013–14 Taça de Portugal
- 2013–14 Taça da Liga
- 2013–14 FC Porto season
