= Tomané Nunes =

Portuguese footballer (born 1987)

Personal information
- Full name: António Manuel Nunes Ferreira
- Date of birth: 15 January 1987 (age 39)
- Place of birth: Nogueira do Cravo, Portugal
- Height: 1.78 m (5 ft 10 in)
- Position: Forward

Youth career
- 1998–2000: Nogueirense
- 2000–2001: Académica
- 2001–2006: Sporting CP

Senior career*
Years	Team	Apps	(Gls)
2006–2007	Sporting CP	1	(0)
2006–2007	→ Barreirense (loan)	15	(2)
2007–2008	Villarreal B	0	(0)
2008–2011	Tourizense	76	(33)
2011–2012	Belenenses	13	(1)
2012–2013	Torreense	14	(4)
Total		119	(40)

International career
2003	Portugal U16	1	(2)
2003–2004	Portugal U17	6	(2)
2005	Portugal U18	6	(2)
2005	Portugal U19	5	(3)
2006–2007	Portugal U20	7	(4)
- * Club domestic league appearances and goals

António Manuel 'Tomané' Nunes Ferreira (born 15 January 1987) is a Portuguese former professional footballer who played as a forward.

== Club career ==
Nunes was born in Nogueira do Cravo, Oliveira do Hospital. A product of Sporting CP's prolific youth system, he made his first competitive appearance for the Lisbon club on 7 January 2006, playing 45 minutes in a 3–2 away loss against S.C. Braga in the Primeira Liga, and added another match the following week in the Taça de Portugal. He spent the next season with F.C. Barreirense of the third division, on loan.

In June 2007, Nunes signed a four-year contract with La Liga side Villarreal CF, but spent the entire campaign with the Valencians' B team in the Segunda División B, where he also failed to appear officially. He subsequently returned to his country, joining G.D. Tourizense in the third tier and scoring 13 goals in his first year, but only four in the second.

Nunes moved to C.F. Os Belenenses of the Segunda Liga in July 2011, after netting 16 times for Tourizense in his final season.

== Personal life ==
Nunes' younger brother, Flávio, was also a footballer.
