= Samuel Araújo =

Brazilian footballer

Personal information
- Full name: Samuel de Araújo Miranda
- Date of birth: 28 March 1988 (age 38)
- Place of birth: Governador Valadares, Minas Gerais, Brazil
- Height: 1.92 m (6 ft 4 in)
- Position: Centre-back

Senior career*
Years	Team	Apps	(Gls)
2007	Ituano		
2008	Oeste		
2009–2010	ASA		
2010–2011	Mafra	26	(0)
2011–2012	Mesaimeer		
2012	Covilhã	8	(0)
2013–2014	Zimbru Chișinău	15	(1)
2014	Icasa	2	(0)
2014–2015	Zawisza Bydgoszcz	11	(0)
2015–2016	Ethnikos Achna	24	(2)
2016	Al-Muharraq		
2016–2020	Al-Hala		
2020–2021	Isa Town		
- * Club domestic league appearances and goals as of 10:01, 28 March 2024 (UTC)

Samuel de Araújo Miranda (born 28 March 1988), known as Samuel Araújo, is a Brazilian professional footballer who plays as a centre-back.
