= Gilberto Silva (Portuguese footballer) =

Portuguese footballer (born 1987)

Personal information
- Full name: Gilberto Manuel Pereira da Silva
- Date of birth: 26 March 1987 (age 39)
- Place of birth: Guimarães, Portugal
- Height: 1.69 m (5 ft 7 in)
- Position: Midfielder

Team information
- Current team: Ponte

Youth career
- 1998–2000: Sandinenses
- 2000–2006: Boavista

Senior career*
Years	Team	Apps	(Gls)
2006–2007	Penalva	26	(0)
2007–2009	Boavista	52	(0)
2009–2011	Ermis	12	(0)
2011–2012	Oliveira Frades	15	(2)
2012–2024	Covilhã	382	(26)
2024–2025	Sandinenses	23	(1)
2025–	Ponte	29	(1)

International career
2002–2003	Portugal U16	13	(1)
2003–2004	Portugal U17	15	(0)
2004–2005	Portugal U18	4	(0)
2005	Portugal U19	4	(0)
2007	Portugal U21	1	(0)
- * Club domestic league appearances and goals as of 16:11, 4 July 2026 (UTC)

Gilberto Manuel Pereira da Silva (born 26 March 1987 in Guimarães, Minho Province) is a Portuguese professional footballer who plays mainly as a central midfielder but also as a right-back for CD Ponte.
