= Manoel (footballer, born 1989) =

Brazilian footballer

Personal information
- Full name: Manoel Cristiano Ribeiro Lemes
- Date of birth: 1 February 1989 (age 37)
- Place of birth: Porto Esperidião, Brazil
- Height: 1.85 m (6 ft 1 in)
- Position: Forward

Senior career*
Years	Team	Apps	(Gls)
2008−2010	Gloria Buzau	1	(0)
2010−2011	Grêmio Anápolis	0	(0)
2010−2011	→ Penafiel (loan)	15	(2)
2011−2012	Penafiel	28	(14)
2012−2013	Braga B	40	(9)
2013−2014	→ Académica (loan)	15	(0)
2015	Grêmio Anápolis	11	(5)
2016–2019	Altos	32	(18)
2018	→ Boa (loan)	14	(3)
2019	→ Imperatriz (loan)	12	(4)
2020	Brasiliense	0	(0)
2020–2022	Altos	49	(15)
2021	→ Vitória (loan)	9	(0)
2022–2023	Capital CF	11	(2)
2023	Altos	19	(2)
- * Club domestic league appearances and goals

Manoel Cristiano Ribeiro Lemes (born 1 February 1989), simply known as Manoel, is a Brazilian former footballer who played as a forward.

== Club career ==
After playing with clubs like Penafiel and Gremio, Manoel joined Braga in a free transfer.

His debut for the Portuguese team was in a Taca de Portugal match against Pampilhosa where he was substituted in 90+3 minutes.

== Honours ==
Braga

- Portuguese League Cup: 2012-13

Altos

- Campeonato Piauiense: 2017,2018 e 2021
