= Centro de Estágios da Académica =

Training facility of Académica de Coimbra

Coordinates: 40°13′38″N 8°26′48″W

The Centro de Estágios da Académica (formerly known as Academia Dolce Vita for sponsoring reasons) is the training facility and youth academy of Associação Académica de Coimbra - O.A.F. football club.

The facility includes one grass field and two synthetic turf training fields, as well as a support building featuring staff's offices, bedrooms, medical care, jacuzzi, fitness and massage centers. The Centro de Estágios da Académica was founded in 2007 and is located in Campos do Bolão, Coimbra. It was built by engineering company A. Baptista de Almeida.
