= Alphousseyni Keita =

Malian footballer

Personal information
- Date of birth: 3 November 1985 (age 41)
- Place of birth: Bamako, Mali
- Height: 1.81 m (5 ft 11 in)
- Position: Midfielder

Youth career
- 2003–2005: Cercle Olympique de Bamako

Senior career*
Years	Team	Apps	(Gls)
2005–2006	Cercle Olympique de Bamako	13	(0)
2007	Djoliba AC	15	(1)
2007–2009	Le Mans	16	(0)
2009	→ Nîmes (loan)	16	(0)
2010–2011	Nîmes	46	(1)
2011–2012	U.D. Leiria	7	(0)
2012–2014	Académica de Coimbra	16	(0)
2014−2015	Gil Vicente	13	(0)
Total		142	(2)

International career
2005–2010	Mali	13	(0)
- * Club domestic league appearances and goals

Alphousseyni Keita (born 3 November 1985) is a Malian former professional footballer who played as a midfielder.

== Club career ==
Born in Bamako, Keita began his career by Cercle Olympique de Bamako, in January 2007 joined to Djoliba AC. After six months he left Djoliba and moved to French side Le Mans, where he played 8 games for the reserve and was promoted to first team in January 2008.

On 28 January 2009, the midfielder joined Nîmes Olympique on loan from Le Mans until the end of the season. One year later, on 7 January 2010, Nîmes signed him permanently until June 2012.

On 29 April 2012, while due to play a game for his new temporary team U.D. Leiria against Feirense, he was accused of running out of the dressing room with a money box containing approximately €6000, and vanished. Later the club stated that the accusation was false. The player agreed not to press charges against the club for defamation.

== International career ==
Keita played his first international game for Mali, on 3 September 2005 against Congo DR national football team.
