= Marcos Paulo (footballer, born 1988) =

Brazilian footballer

Personal information
- Full name: Marcos Paulo Gelmini Gomes
- Date of birth: 13 July 1988 (age 38)
- Place of birth: Pedro Leopoldo, Brazil
- Height: 1.82 m (5 ft 11 1/2 in)
- Position: Midfielder

Team information
- Current team: Académica
- Number: 17

Youth career
- 2006: Venda Nova

Senior career*
Years	Team	Apps	(Gls)
2007	Caldense	15	(2)
2008–2010	Le Mans B	58	(3)
2009–2010	Le Mans	4	(0)
2010–2012	União Leiria	52	(1)
2012–2015	Académica	50	(7)
2015–2019	Panetolikos	94	(5)
2019–2020	Académica	19	(1)
2020–2022	Vizela	58	(5)
2022–2023	Farense	27	(1)
2023–2025	Paços Ferreira	51	(1)
2025–	Académica	28	(6)
- * Club domestic league appearances and goals as of 09:42, 5 August 2026 (UTC)

Marcos Paulo Gelmini Gomes (born 13 July 1988), known as Marcos Paulo, is a Brazilian professional footballer who plays as a midfielder for Liga Portugal 2 club Académica de Coimbra. He also holds Italian nationality.

== Club career ==
Born in Pedro Leopoldo, Minas Gerais, Marcos Paulo played with Venda Nova Futebol Clube and Associação Atlética Caldense in his country. In January 2008, he joined Ligue 1 side Le Mans Union Club 72.

During his two-and-a-half-year spell in France, Paulo was almost exclusively associated with the reserve team. He made his league debut for the main squad on 18 April 2009, featuring 17 minutes of a 2–0 away win against Valenciennes FC.

Marcos Paulo spent the following seasons competing in Portugal's Primeira Liga, with U.D. Leiria and Académica de Coimbra. On 29 July 2015, he signed a two-year contract with Super League Greece club Panetolikos F.C. for an undisclosed fee, where he totalled 105 appearances.

In five of the next six seasons, Marcos Paulo competed in the Liga Portugal 2 with Académica, F.C. Vizela, Farense and F.C. Paços de Ferreira. He won promotion with Vizela in 2020–21, contributing 33 matches and two goals to this achievement (35 in all competitions) and subsequently agreeing to a new deal, and repeated the feat with Farense in 2022–23.

Marcos Paulo returned to Académica on 28 July 2025 aged 37, with the club now in the Liga 3.
