= Ivanildo Cassamá =

Guinea-Bissauan footballer

Ivanildo
Personal information
- Full name: Ivanildo Soares Cassamá
- Date of birth: 9 January 1986 (age 40)
- Place of birth: Bissau, Guinea-Bissau
- Height: 1.75 m (5 ft 9 in)
- Position: Winger

Youth career
- 1996–2004: Porto

Senior career*
Years	Team	Apps	(Gls)
2004–2005	Porto B	26	(7)
2005–2009	Porto	20	(0)
2006–2007	→ União Leiria (loan)	20	(1)
2007–2008	→ Académica (loan)	22	(0)
2008–2009	→ Gil Vicente (loan)	22	(2)
2009–2011	Portimonense	39	(8)
2011–2013	Olhanense	21	(2)
2013–2016	Académica	58	(4)
Total		228	(24)

International career
2002	Portugal U16	7	(3)
2002–2003	Portugal U17	15	(6)
2004–2005	Portugal U19	15	(1)
2007	Portugal U20	3	(0)
2005–2007	Portugal U21	9	(0)
2006	Portugal U23	1	(0)
2006	Portugal B	2	(0)
2010–2015	Guinea-Bissau	14	(0)
- * Club domestic league appearances and goals

Ivanildo Soares Cassamá (born 9 January 1986 in Bissau), known simply as Ivanildo, is a Guinea-Bissauan former professional footballer who played as a winger.

== Honours ==
Porto

- Primeira Liga: 2005–06
- Taça de Portugal: 2005–06
