= Magique (footballer) =

Ivorian footballer

Personal information
- Full name: Judikael Magique Goualy
- Date of birth: 21 January 1993 (age 33)
- Place of birth: Abidjan, Ivory Coast
- Height: 1.80 m (5 ft 11 in)
- Position: Forward

Team information
- Current team: Oliveira de Frades
- Number: 10

Youth career
- 2011–2012: Académica

Senior career*
Years	Team	Apps	(Gls)
2012−2016	Académica	39	(4)
2012−2013	→ Trofense (loan)	19	(2)
2015	→ Şanlıurfaspor (loan)	6	(0)
2016	→ Feirense (loan)	4	(1)
2016−2017	Cova da Piedade	3	(0)
2017	Vizela	12	(0)
2017−2018	Sintrense	23	(0)
2018−2019	Fátima	22	(2)
2019−2020	1º Dezembro	20	(0)
2020	Ribeirão FC	1	(0)
2021	Cinfães	6	(2)
2021–	Oliveira de Frades	88	(23)
- * Club domestic league appearances and goals as of 19:29, 5 October 2024 (UTC)

Judikael Magique Goualy (born 21 January 1993 in Abidjan) simply Magique, is an Ivorian footballer who plays as a forward for Portuguese club Oliveira de Frades.

== Career ==
On 7 February 2012, Magique made his professional debut with Académica in a 2011–12 Taça da Liga match against Oliveirense.

== Honours ==
Académica de Coimbra

- Taça de Portugal: 2011–12
