= John Ogu =

Nigerian footballer (born 1988)

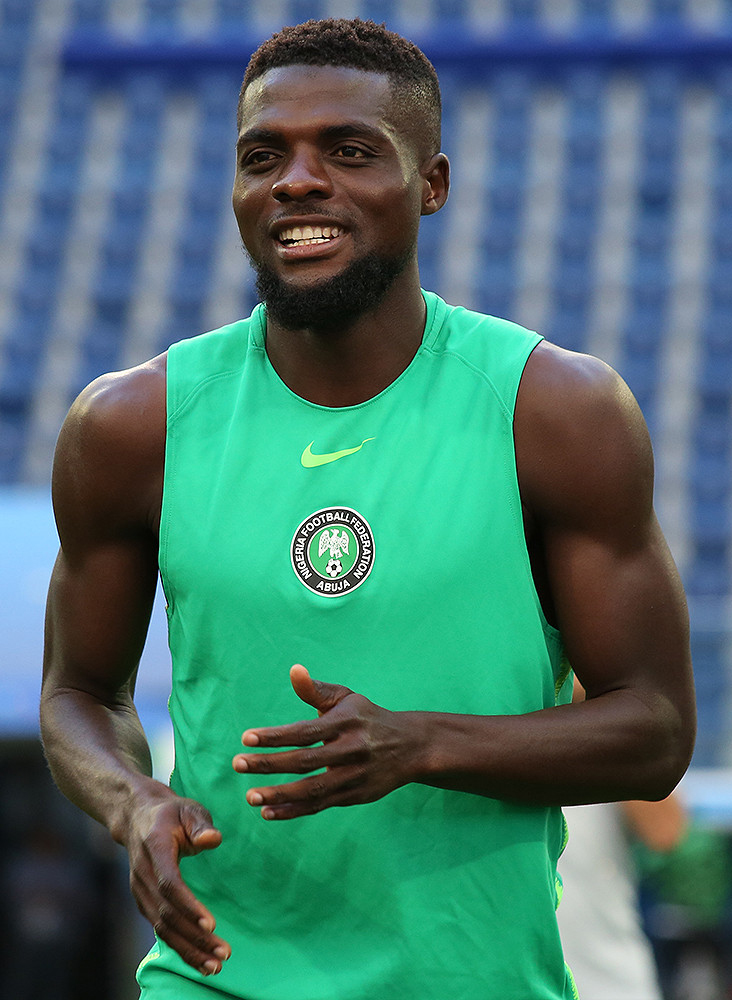
- Ogu training with Nigeria at the 2018 FIFA World Cup

Personal information
- Full name: Ugochukwu John Ogu
- Date of birth: 20 April 1988 (age 38)
- Place of birth: Lagos, Nigeria
- Height: 1.91 m (6 ft 3 in)
- Position: Midfielder

Youth career
- Akwa Starlets
- 2004–2005: Akwa United
- 2005–2006: Flying Sports Academy

Senior career*
Years	Team	Apps	(Gls)
2006–2010	Drava Ptuj	97	(8)
2010–2011	Atlético CP	0	(0)
2011	Almería B	0	(0)
2011–2012	Leiria	17	(3)
2012–2014	Académica	27	(1)
2014–2019	Hapoel Be'er Sheva	151	(13)
2020	Al-Adalah	7	(0)
2022	Hapoel Nof HaGalil	9	(0)
2022–2024	Maccabi Jaffa	65	(1)

International career^{‡}
2013–2019	Nigeria	26	(1)
Medal record
Africa Cup of Nations
Third place	2019 Egypt
- * Club domestic league appearances and goals as of 5 June 2023 (UTC) ‡ National team caps and goals as of 11:09, 17 July 2020 (UTC)

Ugochukwu John OguLiaten (born 20 April 1988) is a Nigerian professional footballer who most recently played as a midfielder for Israeli club Maccabi Jaffa.

== Club career ==
=== Early career ===
Ogu began playing football at the youth departments of Akwa Starlets, Akwa United and the Flying Sports Academy. On 23 September 2006, he began his senior career in Slovenia when he signed with Drava Ptuj from the Slovenian PrvaLiga. In his four-year stint, Ogu scored eight goals in 97 appearances.

=== In Portugal ===
In the summer of 2010, Ogu moved to Atlético Clube de Portugal, which then played in the Terceira Divisão in Portugal. After six months, he moved to neighboring Spain and signed for Almería, but played only in Almería B of the third division. In November 2011 Ogu returned to Portugal and joined Leiria, but at the end of the season the team dropped to the second division.

In July 2012, Ogu moved to Académica from Primeira Liga. Ogu scored his first goal in the third round of the Portuguese Cup against Ponte da Barca. He scored his first league goal against Vitória de Setúbal in a decisive win that ensured the team remain in the top division. All in all, Ogu played two years at Académica and scored one goal in 27 league appearances.

=== Hapoel Be'er Sheva ===
In the 2014–15 season, Ogu arrived in Israel and on 2 September 2014 made his debut in Hapoel Be'er Sheva in a 0–0 draw against Maccabi Petah Tikva in the Toto Cup. On 7 September, he signed a four-year contract with Hapoel Be'er Sheva. Five days later, he made his debut in the Israeli Premier League when he opened the team against Beitar Jerusalem at Vasermil Stadium and on 29 November scored his first goal in Hapoel Be'er Sheva in a 4–0 home win over Maccabi Netanya. In the first season of the team, and at the end of the season reached the finals of the Israel State Cup, losing to Maccabi Tel Aviv.

In the 2015–16 season he competed with Hapoel Be'er Sheva in the UEFA Europa League qualifying and even scored a goal against FC Thun from the Swiss Super League, but the team was eliminated in both games. Later in the season he scored four goals and assisted five, was part of the team's winning the State Championship and was among the candidates for the title of footballer of the season.

Entering the 2016–17 season, Ogu was ranked on Walla Sports web site as the number 1 footballer in Israel by 60 sports journalists and professionals. On 11 August 2016, Ogu won the Israel Super Cup with Hapoel Be'er Sheva after winning 4–2 against Maccabi Haifa. Later on, he faced the UEFA Champions League qualifying team and reached the playoff stage in which he was eliminated against Celtic, and as a result fell to the UEFA Europa League stage. On 28 December, Ogu and Hapoel Be'er Sheva won the Toto Cup after a 4–1 win over Ironi Kiryat Shmona in the final game. On 29 April 2017, Ogu scored the winning goal in the championship game against Maccabi Tel Aviv helping Hapoel Be'er Sheva to win the league championship for the second time in a row.

=== Al-Adalah ===
In January 2020, Ogu signed for Al-Adalah on a six-month contract. He left the club having made seven appearances.

=== Hapoel Nof HaGalil F.C. ===
On 2 February 2022, Ogu returned to Israel to join newly promoted club H. Nof HaGalil until the end of the season.

=== Maccabi Jaffa ===
On 30 May 2022, signed for Maccabi Jaffa.

== International career ==
In March 2013, Ogu was called up to the Nigerian national side for a 2014 FIFA World Cup qualifier. He debuted against Kenya in a 1–1 draw, where he was used as a substitute to replace an injured Victor Moses. On 31 May, Ogu scored his first international goal against Mexico in a friendly game which took place at the Reliant Stadium in Houston. On 9 June, Nigerian coach Stephen Keshi selected Ogu as one of 23 players to participate in the 2013 FIFA Confederations Cup.

On 18 March 2015, he was called up with 27 other players for the proposed friendly matches against Bolivia and South Africa.

In May 2018 he was named to Nigeria's preliminary 30-man squad for the 2018 FIFA World Cup in Russia. He was included in the 23-man squad to AFCON 2019.

== Career statistics ==
=== Club ===
As of 1 July 2023

Appearances and goals by club, season and competition
Club	Season	League			National cup		League cup		Europe		Other		Total		Ref.
Club	Season	Division	Apps	Goals	Apps	Goals	Apps	Goals	Apps	Goals	Apps	Goals	Apps	Goals	Ref.
Drava Ptuj	2006–07	Slovenian PrvaLiga	16	0	0	0	0	0	–		–		16	0	
Drava Ptuj	2007–08	Slovenian PrvaLiga	27	2	1	0	0	0	–		–		28	2	
Drava Ptuj	2008–09	Slovenian PrvaLiga	25	4	1	0	0	0	–		–		26	4	
Drava Ptuj	2009–10	Slovenian PrvaLiga	29	2	2	1	0	0	–		–		31	3	
Drava Ptuj	Total		97	8	4	1	0	0	0	0	0	0	101	9	–
Atlético CP	2010–11	Campeonato de Portugal	0	0	1	0					–		1	0	
Almería B	2010–11	Segunda División B	0	0	0	0	0	0	0	0	–		0	0	
Almería B	2011–12	Segunda División B	0	0	0	0	0	0	0	0	–		0	0	
Almería B	Total		0	0	0	0	0	0	0	0	0	0	0	0	–
Leiria	2011–12	Primeira Liga	17	3	0	0	0	0	–		–		17	3	
Académica	2012–13	Primeira Liga	20	1	2	0	3	0	5	0	1	0	31	1	
Académica	2013–14	Primeira Liga	7	0	1	0	0	0	0	0	–		8	0	
Académica	Total		27	1	3	0	3	0	5	0	1	0	39	1	–
Hapoel Be'er Sheva	2014–15	Israeli Premier League	34	4	6	0	1	0	–		–		41	4	
Hapoel Be'er Sheva	2015–16	Israeli Premier League	34	4	3	0	5	0	2	1	–		44	5	
Hapoel Be'er Sheva	2016–17	Israeli Premier League	30	1	0	0	0	0	13	1	1 (Note: Appearances in the Israel Super Cup)	0	44	2	
Hapoel Be'er Sheva	2017–18	Israeli Premier League	29	3	2	0	4	0	10	1	1	0	46	4	
Hapoel Be'er Sheva	2018–19	Israeli Premier League	24	1	2	0	1	0	5	2	1	0	33	3	
Hapoel Be'er Sheva	Total		151	13	13	0	11	0	30	5	3	0	208	18	–
Al-Adalah	2019–20	Saudi Professional League	7	0	1	0	0	0	–		–		8	0	
Hapoel Nof HaGalil	2021–22	Israeli Premier League	9	0	0	0	0	0	–		–		9	0	
Maccabi Jaffa	2022–23	Liga Leumit	34	1	0	0	0	0	–		–	–	34	1	
Career total			342	26	22	1	14	0	35	5	4	0	417	32	–

=== International ===
As of 16 July 2019

Appearances and goals by national team and year
National team	Year	Apps	Goals
Nigeria	2013	10	0
Nigeria	2014	0	0
Nigeria	2015	2	0
Nigeria	2016	0	0
Nigeria	2017	3	1
Nigeria	2018	7	0
Nigeria	2019	3	0
Nigeria	Total	25	1

As of 1 June 201
Scores and results list Nigeria's goal tally first, score column indicates score after each Ogu goal.

List of international goals scored by John Ogu
No.	Date	Venue	Opponent	Score	Result	Competition
1	10 November 2017	Stade Mohamed Hamlaoui, Constantine, Algeria	Algeria	1–0	1–1	2018 FIFA World Cup qualification

== Honours ==
Hapoel Beer Sheva

- Israeli Premier League: 2015–16, 2016–17, 2017–18
- Israel Super Cup: 2016, 2017
- Toto Cup: 2016–17
