= Cristiano (footballer, born 1983) =

Brazilian footballer

Personal information
- Full name: Cristiano Moraes de Oliveira
- Date of birth: 28 September 1983 (age 43)
- Place of birth: Manaus, Brazil
- Height: 1.74 m (5 ft 8 1/2 in)
- Position: Attacking midfielder

Senior career*
Years	Team	Apps	(Gls)
2001–2005	Nacional-AM		
2005	→ São Raimundo (loan)		
2005–2009	Paços Ferreira	98	(13)
2009–2011	PAOK	15	(0)
2011	Sporting CP	4	(0)
2011	Beira-Mar	10	(2)
2012	Criciúma	5	(1)
2012–2013	Vitória Setúbal	23	(2)
2013	Nacional-AM	2	(0)
2014	Manaus		
Total		157	(18)
- * Club domestic league appearances and goals

Cristiano Moraes de Oliveira (born 28 September 1983), known simply as Cristiano, is a Brazilian former professional footballer who played as an attacking midfielder.

He spent most of his career in Portugal, amassing Primeira Liga totals of 135 games and 17 goals over the course of eight seasons, almost exclusively with Paços de Ferreira.

== Club career ==
Born in Manaus, Amazonas, Cristiano started playing football with two local clubs, Nacional Futebol Clube and São Raimundo Esporte Clube (AM), representing the latter on loan. In August 2005 he moved to Portugal and joined F.C. Paços de Ferreira, being rarely used in his debut season in the Primeira Liga (eight appearances, all as a substitute).

In the 2006–07 campaign, Cristiano contributed 26 matches – two goals, one of them in a 1–1 home draw against Sporting CP on 17 February 2007– as Paços finished in sixth position, qualifying for the UEFA Cup for the first time in their history. He continued to feature regularly for the northerners in the subsequent seasons, scoring a career-best seven goals in 2008–09.

On 6 November 2009, Cristiano netted twice in the 3–0 away win over C.F. Belenenses. In the following transfer window, he moved to PAOK FC from Greece on a two-and-a-half-year contract; after only a few games, he suffered an anterior cruciate ligament injury, being sidelined for about six months.

Cristiano returned to Portugal in late January 2011, joining Sporting as a free agent and reuniting with his former Paços de Ferreira manager Paulo Sérgio. In June, having made just five competitive appearances, he was released and signed a two-year deal with S.C. Beira-Mar shortly after.
