= Afonso (footballer) =

Brazilian footballer (born 1991)

Personal information
- Full name: Manoel Afonso Júnior
- Date of birth: November 14, 1991 (age 35)
- Place of birth: Brazil
- Height: 1.72 m (5 ft 7 1/2 in)
- Position: Forward

Senior career*
Years	Team	Apps	(Gls)
2010	ASA		
2011	Gamba Osaka	5	(0)
2012–2013	Académica de Coimbra	13	(0)
2013	CRB	10	(1)
2013–2014	Botafogo (SP)	4	(0)
2014–2015	Coimbra MG		
2015–2016	CSA	12	(2)
2016	Murici	2	(0)
2016–2017	Brusque	5	(0)
2017	Lagarto	9	(3)
2017	Murici	5	(0)
2018	Interporto	4	(0)
2023	CS Sergipe	14	(2)
- * Club domestic league appearances and goals as of 15:04, 18 February 2024

Manoel Afonso Júnior (born November 14, 1991) is a Brazilian football player.
