= Fábio Santos (footballer, born 1992) =

Portuguese footballer

Personal information
- Full name: Fábio Alexandre Barbosa Santos
- Date of birth: 14 November 1992 (age 33)
- Place of birth: Penafiel, Portugal
- Height: 1.87 m (6 ft 2 in)
- Position: Goalkeeper

Youth career
- 2000–2010: Penafiel
- 2010–2011: Académica

Senior career*
| Years | Team | Apps | (Gls) |
| 2011–2015 | Académica | 0 | (0) |
| 2013–2014 | → Carapinheirense (loan) | 4 | (0) |
| 2015–2017 | Tourizense | 61 | (0) |
| 2017–2018 | Sertanense | 15 | (0) |
| 2018 | Felgueiras | 4 | (0) |
| 2018 | AD Oliveirense | 4 | (0) |
| 2018–2020 | Sanjoanense | 21 | (0) |
| 2020 | Coimbrões | 7 | (0) |
| 2021 | Gondomar | 1 | (0) |
- * Club domestic league appearances and goals as of 17 January 2022

Fábio Alexandre Barbosa Santos (born 14 November 1992) is a Portuguese footballer who plays as a goalkeeper. He is the nephew of former professional goalkeeper Nuno Santos.

== Career ==
Santos was born in Penafiel. On 21 October 2012, he made his professional debut with Académica de Coimbra in a 2012–13 Taça de Portugal match against A.D. Ponte da Barca.
