= Flávio Ferreira =

Portuguese footballer (born 1991)

Personal information
- Full name: Flávio Nunes Ferreira
- Date of birth: 19 October 1991 (age 35)
- Place of birth: Nogueira do Cravo, Portugal
- Height: 1.80 m (5 ft 11 in)
- Positions: Centre-back; defensive midfielder

Youth career
- 2005–2006: Oliveira Hospital
- 2006–2009: Académica

Senior career*
| Years | Team | Apps | (Gls) |
| 2009–2013 | Académica | 43 | (1) |
| 2009–2010 | → Tourizense (loan) | 19 | (3) |
| 2010–2011 | → Covilhã (loan) | 22 | (0) |
| 2013–2016 | Málaga | 16 | (0) |
| Total | | 100 | (4) |

International career
| 2007 | Portugal U16 | 2 | (0) |
| 2008–2009 | Portugal U18 | 5 | (0) |
- * Club domestic league appearances and goals

Flávio Nunes Ferreira (born 19 October 1991) is a Portuguese former professional footballer who played as a central defender or a defensive midfielder.

== Club career ==
Ferreira was born in Nogueira do Cravo, Oliveira do Hospital. After starting his youth career with hometown's F.C. Oliveira do Hospital, he finished his development at Académica de Coimbra.

In August 2009, Ferreira moved to neighbouring G.D. Tourizense – who acted as Académica's farm team – until the end of the season. A year later, he joined Segunda Liga club S.C. Covilhã also on loan, and played his first match as a professional on 26 September 2010, coming on as a second-half substitute in a 1–0 home win against S.C. Freamunde.

Ferreira returned to Académica in June 2011, and made his Primeira Liga debut on 15 August in a 2–1 away victory over U.D. Leiria where he again came from the bench. On 23 December, he renewed his contract until 2015.

On 20 May 2012, Ferreira replaced David Simão for the last 25 minutes of the 1–0 defeat of Sporting CP in the final of the Taça de Portugal. He scored his only goal as a professional on 25 November that year, opening an eventual 2–2 home draw against Gil Vicente F.C. in the domestic league.

On 12 June 2013, Académica agreed a deal for Ferreira with La Liga side Málaga CF, with the player signing a three-year deal. He first appeared in the Spanish league the following 12 January, coming on for the injured Weligton in the 34th minute of a 1–0 loss at Levante UD.

Subsequently, Ferreira was sidelined with back problems for nearly two years. He terminated his contract by mutual consent in January 2016.

== Personal life ==
Ferreira's older brother, António, was also a footballer. He spent most of his career in the lower leagues.

== Honours ==
Académica

- Taça de Portugal: 2011–12
