= Paulo Grilo =

Portuguese footballer (born 1991)

Personal information
- Full name: Paulo Rafael Grilo das Neves
- Date of birth: 19 August 1991 (age 35)
- Place of birth: Figueira da Foz, Portugal
- Height: 1.84 m (6 ft 0 in)
- Position: Defensive midfielder

Team information
- Current team: Naval 1893

Youth career
- 1999–2004: Naval
- 2004–2010: Académica

Senior career*
Years	Team	Apps	(Gls)
2010–2014	Académica	7	(0)
2010–2011	→ Tourizense (loan)	5	(0)
2011–2012	→ Santa Clara (loan)	25	(0)
2012–2013	→ Covilhã (loan)	37	(0)
2014−2015	Penafiel	3	(0)
2015	Feirense	10	(1)
2015−2017	Freamunde	67	(1)
2017−2018	Santa Clara	5	(0)
2018−2022	Lusitânia	111	(8)
2022−2023	São João Ver	27	(1)
2023−2024	Oliveira Hospital	28	(3)
2024−2025	Beira-Mar	25	(2)
2025−	Naval 1893	29	(0)

International career
2010–2011	Portugal U20	3	(0)
- * Club domestic league appearances and goals as of 17:29, 24 September 2026 (UTC)

Paulo Rafael Grilo das Neves (born 19 August 1991 in Figueira da Foz, Coimbra District) is a Portuguese professional footballer who plays as a defensive midfielder for Associação Naval 1893.
