= Salim Cissé =

Guinean footballer (born 1992)

Personal information
- Full name: Salim Cissé
- Date of birth: 24 December 1992 (age 33)
- Place of birth: Conakry, Guinea
- Height: 1.85 m (6 ft 1 in)
- Position: Forward

Team information
- Current team: Marsaxlokk
- Number: 21

Youth career
- Borgo Massimina

Senior career*
Years	Team	Apps	(Gls)
2011–2012	Arezzo	27	(13)
2012–2013	Académica	25	(6)
2013–2016	Sporting B	34	(7)
2014	→ Arouca (loan)	9	(0)
2015	→ Académica (loan)	9	(0)
2016	→ Vitória Setúbal (loan)	9	(2)
2016–2017	Olhanense	35	(7)
2017–2018	Politehnica Iași	11	(1)
2019	Trikala	12	(1)
2019–2020	Amarante	16	(3)
2020	Anadia	4	(1)
2020	Egaleo	3	(0)
2021	Vllaznia Shkodër	15	(0)
2021–	Marsaxlokk	2	(0)

International career^{‡}
2013–2014	Guinea	5	(2)
- * Club domestic league appearances and goals as of 19:28, 10 October 2021 (UTC) ‡ National team caps and goals as of 10 October 2021

Salim Cissé (born 24 December 1992) is a Guinean footballer who plays for Maltese club Marsaxlokk as a forward.

== Club career ==
=== Early years ===
Born in Conakry, Cissé started playing football when he was already 18. He moved to Italy with his parents in 2011, to escape the political situation in his homeland, and started playing the sport with lower league side U.S. Arezzo, based in Tuscany.

=== Académica ===
In summer 2012, Cissé switched to Portugal, signing for three years with Primeira Liga club Académica de Coimbra. He appeared in 41 official games in his first season as a professional and scored nine goals – second-best in the squad only behind Edinho – netting twice in six appearances in the team's campaign in the UEFA Europa League.

=== Sporting ===
Cissé continued in the country for 2013–14, penning a five-year contract with Sporting CP. He spent his first season, however, mainly registered with the reserves in the Segunda Liga.

On 20 January 2014, Cissé was loaned out to fellow top flight side F.C. Arouca until June. Still in that level and still owned by Sporting, he went on to represent Académica and Vitória de Setúbal.

=== Olhanense ===
On 31 August 2016, Cissé signed for S.C. Olhanense. He scored twice in the last day of the season to help the hosts defeat F.C. Penafiel 3–1, but they were already relegated to the Campeonato de Portugal after finishing in last place.

=== Politehnica Iași ===
In September 2017, Cissé signed with Romanian Liga I team CSM Politehnica Iași on a two-year deal. He scored his first goal for his new club on 24 October, contributing to a 2–1 away win over FC Argeș Pitești in the Cupa României.

== Personal life ==
Cissé is a practicing Muslim.
