= João Dias (footballer) =

Portuguese footballer (born 1986)

Personal information
- Full name: João Manuel Antunes Dias
- Date of birth: 23 December 1986 (age 39)
- Place of birth: Braga, Portugal
- Height: 1.80 m (5 ft 11 in)
- Position: Right-back

Youth career
- 1998–2003: Braga
- 2003–2005: Porto

Senior career*
Years	Team	Apps	(Gls)
2005–2006	Porto B	21	(0)
2006–2008	Prato	1	(0)
2008	Infesta	10	(1)
2008–2010	Santa Clara	59	(1)
2010–2011	Trofense	27	(1)
2011–2014	Académica	30	(0)
2014–2015	Boavista	22	(0)
2015–2017	Santa Clara	64	(2)
2017–2018	Covilhã	34	(0)
2018–2022	União Leiria	107	(1)
Total		375	(6)

International career
2002–2003	Portugal U17	20	(0)
2004	Portugal U18	5	(0)
2004–2005	Portugal U19	10	(0)
2006	Portugal U20	2	(0)
2009	Portugal U23	2	(0)
Medal record
Men's football
Representing Portugal
UEFA European U17 Championship
Winner	2003 Portugal
- * Club domestic league appearances and goals

João Manuel Antunes Dias (born 23 December 1986) is a Portuguese former professional footballer who played as a right-back.

== Club career ==
Born in Braga, Dias played youth football with local S.C. Braga as well as FC Porto. He made his senior debut with the latter's B team, which competed in the third division. In the summer of 2006, he signed for Italian amateurs A.C. Prato.

Dias first appeared at the professional level in 2008–09, with C.D. Santa Clara. He scored his first goal for the Azores side the following season when he contributed to a 2–1 home win against Varzim SC, and in June 2010 he joined fellow Segunda Liga club C.D. Trofense on a one-year contract.

In June 2011, Dias agreed to a two-year deal at Académica de Coimbra. His maiden appearance in the Primeira Liga took place on 15 August, when he played the full 90 minutes of the 2–1 away victory over U.D. Leiria. During his spell at the Estádio Cidade de Coimbra, however, he was sparingly used.

In 2015, after one top-flight campaign with Boavista FC, Dias returned to both Santa Clara and the second tier.

== Honours ==
Académica

- Taça de Portugal: 2011–12

Portugal Under-17

- UEFA European Under-17 Championship: 2003
