= João Real =

Portuguese footballer

Personal information
- Full name: João Daniel Mendes Real
- Date of birth: 13 May 1983 (age 43)
- Place of birth: Covilhã, Portugal
- Height: 1.84 m (6 ft 1/2 in)
- Position: Centre-back

Youth career
- 1994–2001: Estação

Senior career*
Years	Team	Apps	(Gls)
2001–2003	Estação		
2003–2008	Covilhã	106	(13)
2008–2011	Naval	31	(1)
2011–2019	Académica	176	(16)
Total		313	(30)
- * Club domestic league appearances and goals

João Daniel Mendes Real (born 13 May 1983) is a Portuguese former professional footballer who played as a central defender.

He made 211 competitive appearances over eight years for Académica, where he won the Taça de Portugal in 2012. He additionally represented Naval in Primeira Liga and Covilhã in LigaPro, totalling 122 and 115 games in each division.

== Club career ==
Born in Covilhã, Real started playing amateur football with locals of A.D. Estação. In 2003, at the age of 20, he switched to city giants Sporting Clube, twice helping them promote to the second division.

In the summer of 2008, after a solid season – his second promotion – which brought him six goals in 25 matches, Real moved to the Primeira Liga with Associação Naval 1º de Maio. His first year was quite unassuming, as he had to wait until 15 February 2009 to make his league debut, playing eight minutes in a 2–2 away draw against C.D. Trofense.

In the 2009–10 campaign, with Naval again remaining in the top flight, Real appeared more, but was still a fringe player. On 17 April 2010, he found the net in the club's 3–1 win at F.C. Paços de Ferreira, but also scored an own goal.

Real featured regularly in 2010–11, but the Figueira da Foz side were relegated after a six-year stay. In June 2011, he signed for Académica de Coimbra on a free transfer. In his first year with the Students, he played the final of the Taça de Portugal as they won their first trophy in 73 years via a 1–0 victory over Sporting CP.

On 20 August 2012, in the first game of the new season, Real was sent off after seven minutes at S.C. Beira-Mar for conceding a penalty kick with a foul on Nildo Petrolina; his team recovered from a 3–0 deficit to earn a draw. In May 2014, he extended his contract for three more years.

Real remained a regular for Académica over the coming years, including after their relegation in 2016. He retired in July 2019 at the age of 36, after his link expired; also hanging up his boots on the same day was Marinho, who had arrived at the club in precisely the same deal from Naval and was the only other survivor from the cup final win.

== Honours ==
Académica

- Taça de Portugal: 2011–12
