= Estádio Municipal de Aveiro =

Football stadium in Aveiro, Portugal

Coordinates: 40°38′51″N 8°35′37″W

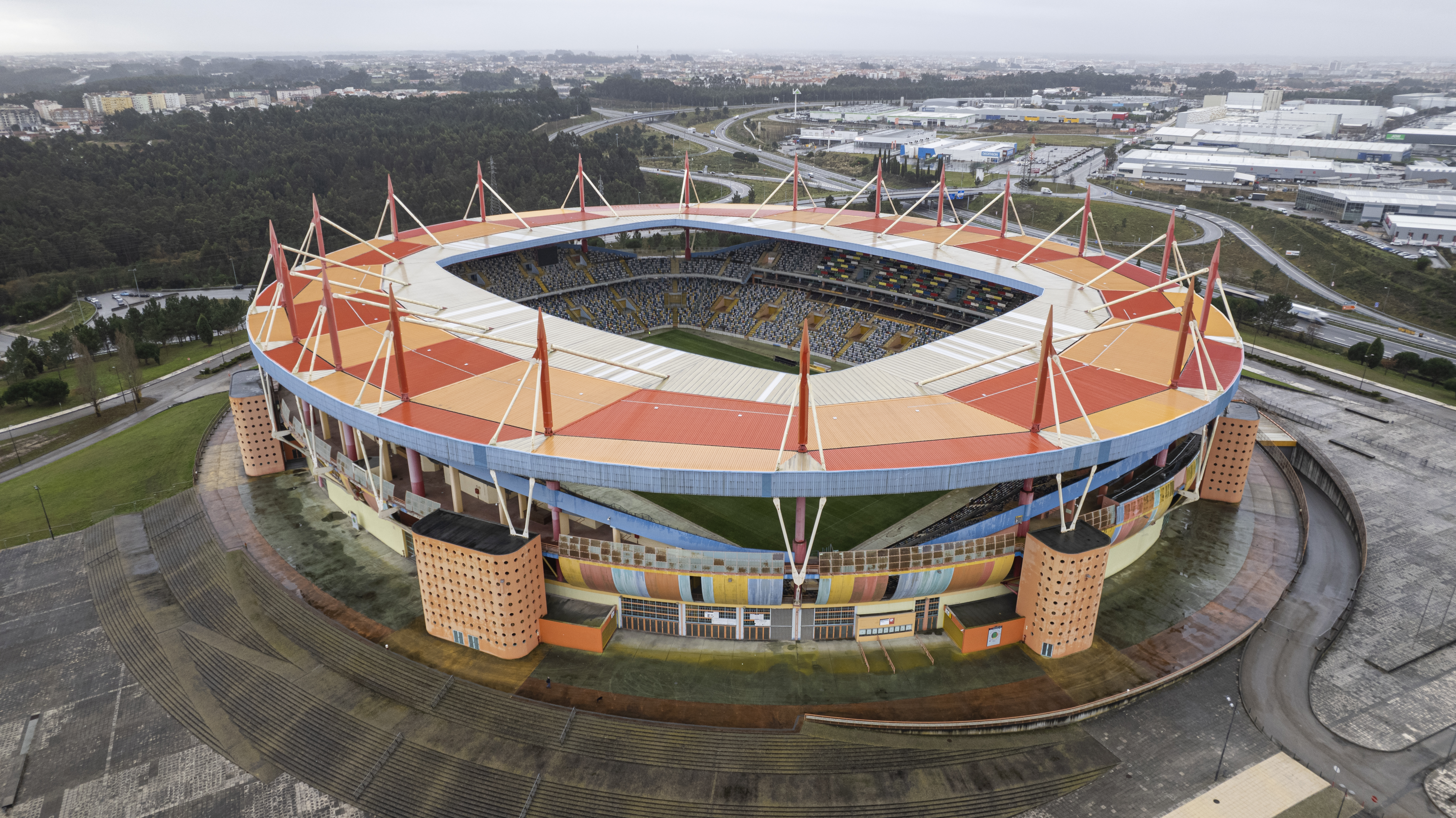
- UEFA
- Interactive map of Estádio Municipal de Aveiro
- Full name: Estádio Municipal de Aveiro
- Location: Aveiro, Portugal
- Owner: Municipality of Aveiro
- Capacity: 32,830
- Surface: Grass
- Record attendance: 29,935 (19 June 2004); Netherlands 2–3 Czech Republic
- Field size: 105 x 68 m

Construction
- Built: 2003
- Opened: 15 November 2003
- Cost: €68.100 million
- Architect: Tomás Taveira

Tenants
- Beira-Mar (2003–2015, 2019–present); Portugal national football team (selected matches)

The Estádio Municipal de Aveiro (English: Aveiro Municipal Stadium) is a football stadium in Aveiro, Portugal. It was designed for the UEFA Euro 2004 tournament by Portuguese architect Tomás Taveira. It has a capacity of 32,830 spectators, making it the fifth largest football stadium in Portugal.

The stadium has been primarily used by the historic club SC Beira-Mar since its inauguration, with the exception of the seasons between 2015–2019 when it returned to its former home, the Estádio Mário Duarte, which was demolished in 2020.

Amongst the most notable football games at the venue are two matches of the UEFA Euro 2004 championship, five matches of the Portugal national team, and eleven matches of the Supertaça Cândido de Oliveira (Portuguese Super Cup).

== Design ==
Estádio Municipal de Aveiro Stadium has a unique design that combines a simple shape with a variety of bright colours throughout the entire stadium. It was the design of architect Tomás Taveira to introduce tonality colours to the exterior of the stadium and to subsequently give a feeling of motion and a visual effect. The stadium resembles a toy for children with many coloured parts gathered together.

The stadium's polychromy and dynamism is also reflected on the interior where four tribunes contain a curvilinear profile and multicoloured seats. These have different colours that are distributed in a random way. The roof contributes to the visuals process by making the stadium look like a big toy. It contains sharply red steel pylons that uphold sky-blue edges. From a more formal point of view, the slightly waved roof unifies the curved course of the underlying tribunes that offer a view over the pylons and its steel tie-beams.

== UEFA Euro 2004 ==
The following UEFA Euro 2004 matches were held in the stadium.

Date	Team #1	Result	Team #2	Round	Attendance
15 June 2004	Czech Republic	2–1	Latvia	Group D	21,744
19 June 2004	Netherlands	2–3	Czech Republic	Group D	29,935

== Portugal national team matches ==
The following national team matches were held in the stadium.

#	Date	Score	Opponent	Competition
1.	15 November 2003	1–1	Greece	Friendly
2.	8 October 2005	2–1	Liechtenstein	World Cup 2006 qualification
3.	20 August 2008	5–0	Faroe Islands	Friendly
4.	29 March 2011	2–0	Finland	Friendly
5.	7 September 2014	0–1	Albania	Euro 2016 qualifying
6.	7 October 2016	6–0	Andorra	World Cup 2018 qualification
7.	11 June 2024	3–0	Republic of Ireland	Friendly

== Supertaça Cândido de Oliveira finals ==
The following Portuguese Super Cup finals took place at this stadium:

Edition	Season	Date	Winner	Score	Runner-up
31st	2009	9 August 2009	FC Porto	2–0	F.C. Paços de Ferreira
32nd	2010	7 August 2010	FC Porto	2–0	S.L. Benfica
33rd	2011	7 August 2011	FC Porto	2–1	Vitória de Guimarães
34th	2012	11 August 2012	FC Porto	1–0	Académica de Coimbra
35th	2013	10 August 2013	FC Porto	3–0	Vitória de Guimarães
36th	2014	10 August 2014	S.L. Benfica	0–0; 3–2 (p)	Rio Ave FC
38th	2016	7 August 2016	S.L. Benfica	3–0	SC Braga
39th	2017	5 August 2017	S.L. Benfica	3–1	Vitória de Guimarães
40th	2018	4 August 2018	FC Porto	3–1	CD Aves
42nd	2020	23 December 2020	FC Porto	2–0	Benfica
43rd	2021	31 July 2021	Sporting CP	2–1	Braga

== See also ==
- List of football stadiums in Portugal
- Lists of stadiums
