= Cleyton (footballer, born 1990) =

Brazilian footballer

Personal information
- Full name: Cleyton Rafael Lima da Silva
- Date of birth: 24 February 1990 (age 36)
- Place of birth: Mato Grosso do Sul, Brazil
- Height: 1.76 m (5 ft 9 in)
- Position: Midfielder

Team information
- Current team: Botafogo-PB (on loan from Operário Ferroviário)

Senior career*
Years	Team	Apps	(Gls)
2011–2012	Iraty	37	(2)
2012–2016	Académica	66	(4)
2014–2015	→ FC Tyumen (loan)	18	(5)
2015	→ ABC (loan)	7	(0)
2015–2016	→ CSA (loan)	29	(11)
2016	→ Paysandu (loan)	7	(2)
2017	CSA	18	(4)
2017	→ Botafogo-PB (loan)	16	(0)
2018–	Operário Ferroviário	73	(3)
2021–	→ Botafogo-PB (loan)	0	(0)
- * Club domestic league appearances and goals as of 10 March 2019

Cleyton Rafael Lima da Silva (born 24 February 1990), simply known as Cleyton, is a Brazilian footballer playing for Botafogo-PB, on loan from Operário Ferroviário, as a midfielder.

== Club career ==
Cleyton played for Iraty in his native Brazil between 2011 and 2012, where he made 35 appearances. Cleyton then moved to Académica in the Portuguese Primeira Liga in 2012, signing a two-year contract.

In July 2014, Cleyton moved to FC Tyumen of the Russian National Football League on a season-long loan deal.

On 27 November 2017, Cleyton signed for Operário.

== Career statistics ==
As of match played 22 November 2014

Club	Season	League			National Cup		League Cup		Continental		Other		Total	
Club	Season	Division	Apps	Goals	Apps	Goals	Apps	Goals	Apps	Goals	Apps	Goals	Apps	Goals
Iraty	2011	Campeonato Paranaense	15	0	1	0	0	0	0	0	0	0	16	0
Iraty	2012	Campeonato Paranaense	20	2	0	0	0	0	0	0	0	0	20	2
Iraty	Total		35	2	1	0	0	0	0	0	0	0	36	2
Académica de Coimbra	2012–13	Primeira Liga	25	1	3	0	2	0	5	0	1	0	36	1
Académica de Coimbra	2013–14	Primeira Liga	22	2	3	0	2	0	0	0	0	0	27	2
Académica de Coimbra	Total		47	3	6	0	4	0	5	0	1	0	63	3
Tyumen (loan)	2014–15	RNFL	14	4	0	0	0	0	0	0	0	0	14	4
Tyumen (loan)	Total		14	4	0	0	0	0	0	0	0	0	14	4
Career total			96	9	7	0	4	0	5	0	1	0	113	9
