= Makelele (footballer, born 1985) =

Brazilian footballer

Personal information
- Full name: Leandro dos Santos de Jesus
- Date of birth: 26 February 1985 (age 41)
- Place of birth: Salvador, Brazil
- Height: 1.71 m (5 ft 7 in)
- Position: Defensive midfielder

Team information
- Current team: Botafogo

Youth career
- 2002–2003: Real Salvador Esporte Clube
- 2004: Santo André

Senior career*
Years	Team	Apps	(Gls)
2005–2006	Santo André	35	(4)
2007–2009	Palmeiras	27	(0)
2008–2009	→ Grêmio (loan)	21	(0)
2009	→ Coritiba (loan)	6	(0)
2010	Santo André	16	(0)
2011	Pelotas		
2011	ABC	28	(0)
2012	Linense		
2012–2014	Académica		
2014–2015	Kuwait SC		
2016–	Botafogo		
- * Club domestic league appearances and goals

Leandro dos Santos de Jesus, or simply Makelele (born 26 February 1985), is a Brazilian footballer who plays as a defensive midfielder for Botafogo.

== Career ==
On 25 September 2009, it was announced that Makelele would play for Coritiba Foot Ball Club, on loan from Palmeiras, until the end of the Campeonato Brasileiro, in the next month of December 2009.

On 30 March 2016, it was confirmed that Makelele has signed with Botafogo.

== Honours ==
Palmeiras

- São Paulo State Championship: 2008
