= Bruno China =

Portuguese footballer

Personal information
- Full name: Bruno Manuel Rodrigues Silva
- Date of birth: 5 August 1982 (age 44)
- Place of birth: Matosinhos, Portugal
- Height: 1.82 m (6 ft 0 in)
- Position: Defensive midfielder

Youth career
- 1992–2001: Leixões

Senior career*
Years	Team	Apps	(Gls)
2001–2009	Leixões	186	(6)
2009–2010	Mallorca	9	(0)
2010–2012	Rio Ave	27	(1)
2012–2014	Académica	29	(1)
2014–2015	Belenenses	34	(0)
2016–2018	Leixões	81	(5)
Total		366	(13)

Managerial career
- 2018–2020: Leixões (assistant)
- 2020: Leixões (interim)
- 2021: Espinho
- 2021–2022: Felgueiras 1932
- 2022: Trofense
- 2023: Varzim
- 2024: Anadia
- * Club domestic league appearances and goals

Bruno Manuel Rodrigues Silva (born 5 August 1982), known as Bruno China, is a Portuguese former professional footballer who played as a defensive midfielder, currently a manager.

He spent most of his career with Leixões, representing the club in all three major levels of Portuguese football. He appeared in 150 Primeira Liga matches over eight seasons, and also played in Spain.

== Playing career ==
China, a youth product of Leixões S.C. that was born in Matosinhos, participated in the club's promotion from the third division into the Primeira Liga. He made his debut in the latter competition on 18 August 2007, on the first day of the season against S.L. Benfica (1–1 home draw), and only missed one game as the side retained their league status.

On 20 August 2009, after extensive negotiations, China joined Spain's RCD Mallorca on a three-year contract, even though manager Gregorio Manzano opposed his signing. He made his La Liga debut on 13 September, playing the last five minutes of a 1–1 draw at Villarreal CF, and appeared rarely throughout the campaign as the Balearic Islands team finished fifth and qualified for the UEFA Europa League.

China was released from contract in August 2010, returning to his country shortly after with Rio Ave FC. He continued competing in the top flight the following years, representing Académica de Coimbra and C.F. Os Belenenses.

In late December 2015, the 33-year-old China returned to Leixões. He retired three years later, after as many second-tier seasons.

== Coaching career ==
China worked as an assistant manager at his last club. He was the side's interim manager for one game after the dismissal of Carlos Pinto in January 2020, leaving the under-23 side and the Estádio do Mar altogether after not being retained.

On 7 January 2021, China was appointed head coach at S.C. Espinho in the third tier. In the ensuing summer, he joined F.C. Felgueiras 1932 in the same league.
