= Olegário Benquerença =

Portuguese football referee

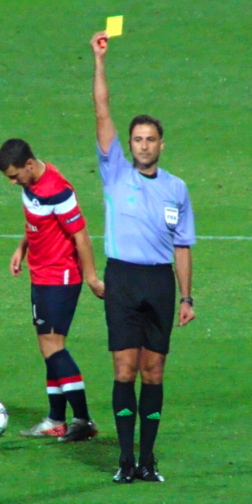
Benquerença in a Champions League match

Olegário Manuel Bartolo Faustino Benquerença (born 18 October 1969 in Batalha) is a retired Portuguese football referee. As of 11 March 2009, he has refereed 11 matches in the Champions League and 11 matches in the UEFA Cup (not counting qualification rounds). He also refereed in qualifiers for 2006 FIFA World Cup, UEFA Euro 2008, and 2010 FIFA World Cup.

In 2004, he officiated the match between Vitória de Guimarães and Benfica (0–1), a tragic encounter in which Benfica player Miklós Fehér suffered a cardiac arrest on the pitch after being shown a yellow card and subsequently died in hospital at the age of 24.

He was preselected as a referee for the 2010 FIFA World Cup and was the head referee in the quarterfinal between Uruguay and Ghana. In this game he gave Luis Suárez a red card for blatantly blocking a shot with his hands to save what would have been the extra-time winner.

Benquerença gave a touchline dismissal to Auxerre defender Jean-Pascal Mignot, during an AFC Ajax v AJ Auxerre UEFA Champions League group stage match in October 2010. Mignot was warming up during the final moments of the game, having not yet taken to the field, and was sent-off for continually remonstrating against a decision that went against his team.

In 2015, he retired from refereeing at the age of 45 following a match at the Estádio do Dragão.

He lives in the Portuguese city of Leiria.
