= 2012–13 S.L. Benfica season =

Benfica
2012–13 season
- President: Luís Filipe Vieira
- Manager: Jorge Jesus
- Stadium: Estádio da Luz
- Primeira Liga: 2nd
- Taça de Portugal: Runners-up
- Taça da Liga: Semi-finals
- UEFA Champions League: Group stage
- UEFA Europa League: Runners-up
- Top goalscorer: League: Lima (20); All: Óscar Cardozo (33)
- Highest home attendance: 63,847 v Barcelona (2 October 2012)
- Lowest home attendance: 13,872 v Académica (9 January 2013)
- Average home league attendance: 42,359
- Biggest win: Benfica 6–0 Desportivo das Aves (2 January 2013)
- Biggest defeat: Benfica 0–2 Barcelona (2 October 2012)
Home colours	Away colours

The 2012–13 season was Sport Lisboa e Benfica's 109th season in existence and the club's 79th consecutive season in the top flight of Portuguese football. It involved Benfica competing in the Primeira Liga, Taça de Portugal, Taça da Liga and the group stage of the UEFA Champions League. Benfica qualified for the Champions League by coming second in the previous Primeira Liga.

Benfica could have enjoyed a treble in May if they could win the UEFA Europa League, maintain their lead in the Primeira Liga, and win the Taça de Portugal. In the league, they came second to Porto after conceding a 90th-minute goal; and despite a win in their last match, they could not prevent their rivals from winning the title. Afterwards, they lost the UEFA Europa League final to then European champions Chelsea (2–1) when Branislav Ivanović headed in an injury-time winner. In the Taça de Portugal, Benfica reached the final for the first time since 2004–05 Taça de Portugal but lost to Vitória de Guimarães, conceding two goals in two minutes. The Taça da Liga ended at the semi-finals, which prevented Benfica for winning their fifth league cup in a row.

In the UEFA Champions League, Benfica finished third in the group stage, with ten points, behind Barcelona and Celtic, and was relegated to the UEFA Europa League, where they reached the club's ninth European final and first since 1990.

== Season summary ==
=== Pre-season ===
After two unsuccessful seasons without winning the league title, Benfica retained Jorge Jesus as manager for a fourth year. During the summer transfer window, starting midfielders Javi García and Axel Witsel were sold to Manchester City for €23 million and Zenit Saint Petersburg for €40 million, respectively, with García departing on the final day of the window. Striker Javier Saviola’s contract was mutually terminated, and he subsequently joined Málaga on a free transfer. Starting left-back Emerson was also sold, joining Turkish club Trabzonspor for €1.6 million. Other notable departures included left-back Joan Capdevila, who transferred to Espanyol for €500,000, the loan of long-serving midfielder Ruben Amorim to Braga, and the loan of striker Nélson Oliveira to Deportivo de La Coruña. In the winter transfer window, winger Nolito was loaned to Granada.

In terms of arrivals, right winger Eduardo Salvio returned from Atlético Madrid for €13.5 million, while Ola John, who had faced Benfica the previous season in UEFA Champions League qualifying, was signed for €9 million. Benfica also added striker Lima from Braga.

For squad depth, the club signed goalkeeper Paulo Lopes from Feirense, defender Luisinho from Paços de Ferreira, midfielder Michel from Braga, and forward Hugo Vieira from Gil Vicente, who was immediately loaned to Sporting de Gijón. Returning from loan spells were Lorenzo Melgarejo (Paços de Ferreira), Carlos Martins (Granada), Enzo Pérez (Estudiantes), and Alan Kardec (Santos).

The preseason featured a 2–0 win over Marseille, followed by victories against Hamm Benfica, Śląsk Wrocław, Real Madrid (5–2), and Gil Vicente, draws with Lille and Juventus, and a defeat to PSV Eindhoven.

After the departures of García and Witsel, Nemanja Matić and Enzo Pérez established themselves in the starting lineup, while Lima quickly secured a regular place alongside Óscar Cardozo, relegating Rodrigo to the bench.

=== August-November ===
The official season began on 8 August with a 2–2 home draw against Braga, followed by victories over Nacional and Vitória de Setúbal, and a 0–0 away draw with Celtic in the Champions League. Benfica then drew 2–2 away with Académica and won 2–1 against F.C. Paços de Ferreira, finishing September level on points with Porto.

October opened with a 2–0 home defeat to FC Barcelona in the Champions League, followed by a league win over Beira-Mar, a Taça de Portugal victory over Freamunde, a 2–1 away loss to Spartak Moskva in the Champions League, and a 3–0 away win against Gil Vicente. In November, Benfica won all of their matches: 3–0 at home against Vitória de Guimarães, 2–0 at home against Spartak Moskva in the Champions League, 1–0 away against Rio Ave in the league, 2–0 away against Moreirense in the fourth round of the Taça de Portugal, 2–1 at home against Celtic in the Champions League, and 2–0 at home against Olhanense. They ended the month still level on points with Porto.

=== December-January ===
December began with a 0–0 draw at Camp Nou against Barcelona in the Champions League, a result that eliminated Benfica from the group stage and sent them into the UEFA Europa League, followed by a 3–1 league win over Sporting at the Estádio José Alvalade, featuring a hat-trick from Cardozo. Benfica then recorded a 4–1 home win over Marítimo, a 2–1 away win against Olhanense and a 1–1 draw with Moreirense, both in the Taça da Liga.

The new year began with a 6–0 win over C.D. Aves in the Taça de Portugal, followed by a 3–1 away win against Estoril and a 4–0 away victory over Académica in the Taça da Liga, which qualified Benfica for the semi-finals. On 13 January, Benfica hosted Porto in the league, drawing 2–2. They then defeated Académica 4–0 in the Taça de Portugal quarter-finals, Moreirense 2–0 in the league, Braga 2–1 away, and Paços de Ferreira 2–0 in the first leg of the Taça de Portugal semi-finals, ending the month level on points with Porto.

=== February-April ===
In February, Benfica recorded league wins over Vitória de Setúbal, Académica, and Paços de Ferreira, and drew away against Nacional. In Europe, they eliminated Bayer Leverkusen 3–1 on aggregate in the Europa League round of 32 (1–0 away, 2–1 home). The month concluded with elimination from the Taça da Liga after a penalty shootout loss to Braga in the semi-finals.

March saw Benfica win all of their matches: 1–0 against Beira-Mar in the league, 1–0 at home and 3–2 away against Bordeaux in the Europa League round of 16, 5–0 against Gil Vicente, 4–0 away against Vitória de Guimarães, and 6–1 at home against Rio Ave, finishing the month four points clear of Porto. The next month opened with a 3–1 home win against Newcastle United in the Europa League quarter-finals, followed by a 2–2 draw away to progress to the semi-finals. In the league, Benfica defeated Olhanense, Sporting at home, and Marítimo away, while also drawing 1–1 with Paços de Ferreira in the second leg of the Taça de Portugal semi-final to advance 3–1 on aggregate. The month ended with a 1–0 away defeat to Fenerbahçe in the first leg of the Europa League semi-finals.

=== May ===
May opened with a 3–1 home win over Fenerbahçe, with two goals from Cardozo, which qualified Benfica for their first European final in 23 years. Shortly after, Benfica drew 1–1 at home against Estoril, reducing their league lead to two points, before visiting the Estádio do Dragão. Ahead of the decisive league match, both Benfica and Porto remained unbeaten. Benfica took the lead in the 19th minute through Lima, but a stoppage-time goal gave Porto victory and put them in control of the title race.

On 15 May, Benfica faced Chelsea in the 2013 UEFA Europa League final at the Amsterdam Arena, losing 2–1 after a stoppage-time header from Ivanović. It was the club's sixth consecutive defeat in a European final. Four days later, Benfica met Vitória de Guimarães in the Taça de Portugal final at the Jamor. Nicolás Gaitán opened the scoring for Benfica, but two second-half goals secured victory for Vitória, leaving Benfica without a trophy despite competing for three major titles.

== Competitions ==
Win Draw Loss Postponed

=== Pre-season ===
13 July 2012 Friendly	Benfica	2–0	Marseille	Sion, Switzerland
19:45 CET (UTC+01)	Cardozo 37' (pen.); Martins 90+1'			Stadium: Stade Tourbillon; Attendance: 7,569; Referee: Sascha Amhof

15 July 2012 Friendly	Benfica	3–0	Hamm Benfica	Hesperange, Luxembourg
19:45 CET (UTC+01)	Pereira 49'; Cardozo 67'; Nolito 85'			Stadium: Stade Alphonse Theis; Attendance: 5,000; Referee: Laurent Kopriwa

16 July 2012 Friendly	Lille	0–0	Benfica	Metz, France
19:30 CET (UTC+01)				Stadium: Stade Saint-Symphorien; Attendance: 5,000; Referee: Antony Gautier

21 July 2012 Polish Masters	Śląsk Wrocław	2–4	Benfica	Wrocław, Poland
16:00 UTC	Elsner 67'; Sobota 69'		11' Cardozo; 60' Luisão; 73' Martins; 89' Gaitán	Stadium: Stadion Miejski; Attendance: 30,000; Referee: Robert Małek

22 July 2012 Polish Masters	PSV Eindhoven	3–1	Benfica	Wrocław, Poland
13:45 UTC	Jørgensen 54'; Lens 74'; Wijnaldum 83'		34' Martins	Stadium: Stadion Miejski; Attendance: 15,000; Referee: Tomasz Garbowski

27 July 2012 Eusébio Cup	Benfica	5–2	Real Madrid	Estádio da Luz, Portugal
19:00 WEST (UTC+01:00)	García 4'; Witsel 22'; Pérez 53', 85'; Martins 58'	Report	Callejón 18', 20'	Attendance: 35,476; Referee: Bruno Paixão

28 July 2012 Friendly	Gil Vicente	2–5	Benfica	Barcelos, Portugal
19:30 CET (UTC+01)	Cláudio 40'; Pereira 52'		Mora 14', 23', 35'; Vítor 18'; Michel 67'	Stadium: Estádio Cidade de Barcelos; Attendance: 5,000; Referee: Cosme Machado

1 August 2012 Friendly	Benfica	1–1	Juventus	Geneva, Switzerland
18:00 CET (UTC+01)	Cardozo 88'		Krasić 90+2'	Stadium: Stade de Genève; Attendance: 5,000; Referee: Stéphan Studer

11 August 2012 Friendly	Fortuna Düsseldorf	0–0; Suspended (Note: Match suspended by Christian Fischer after being pushed to the ground by Luisão.)	Benfica	Düsseldorf, Germany
18:00 CET (UTC+01)				Stadium: Esprit Arena; Attendance: 25,000; Referee: Christian Fischer

=== Primeira Liga ===
==== League table ====
Pos	Team	Pld	W	D	L	GF	GA	GD	Pts	Qualification or relegation
1	Porto (C)	30	24	6	0	70	14	+56	78	Qualification for the Champions League group stage
2	Benfica	30	24	5	1	77	20	+57	77	Qualification for the Champions League group stage
3	Paços de Ferreira	30	14	12	4	42	29	+13	54	Qualification for the Champions League play-off round
4	Braga	30	16	4	10	60	44	+16	52	Qualification for the Europa League play-off round
5	Estoril	30	13	6	11	47	37	+10	45	Qualification for the Europa League third qualifying round

Source: LPFP (in Portuguese)
Rules for classification: 1) Points; 2) Head-to-head points; 3) Head-to-head goal difference; 4) Head-to-head away goals scored; 5) Goal difference; 6) Matches won; 7) Goals scored; 8) Play-off.
(Note: LPFP decided that only criteria 1, 5, 6 and 7 would be applied to establish the classification during the competition.)
(C) Champions

==== Results summary ====
Overall								Home						Away					
Pld	W	D	L	GF	GA	GD	Pts	W	D	L	GF	GA	GD	W	D	L	GF	GA	GD
30	24	5	1	77	20	+57	77	12	3	0	42	9	+33	12	2	1	35	11	+24

Last updated: 19 May 2013.
Source: lpfp.pt and League matches

==== Results by round ====
Round	1	2	3	4	5	6	7	8	9	10	11	12	13	14	15	16	17	18	19	20	21	22	23	24	25	26	27	28	29	30
Ground	H	A	H	A	A	H	A	H	A	H	A	H	A	H	A	A	H	A	H	H	A	H	A	H	A	H	A	H	A	H
Result	D	W	W	D	W	W	W	W	W	W	W	W	W	D	W	W	W	D	W	W	W	W	W	W	W	W	W	D	L	W
Position	5	1	1	2	1	2	1	2	2	2	1	1	1	1	1	2	2	2	2	2	1	1	1	1	1	1	1	1	2	2

Source: LPFP
A = Away; H = Home; W = Win; D = Draw; L = Loss

==== Matches ====
18 August 2012 1	Benfica	2–2	Braga	Lisbon
20:15 CET (UTC+01)	Pereira (yellow card) 18'; Salvio 49'; Bruno César (yellow card) 59'; Cardozo 72' (pen.) (yellow card) 73'	Report	Melgarejo 54' (o.g.); Mossoró 62'	Stadium: Estádio da Luz; Attendance: 53,357; Referee: Artur Soares Dias

26 August 2012 2	Vitória de Setúbal	0–5	Benfica	Setúbal
20:15 CET (UTC+01)	Amoreirinha (red card) 8'; Bruno Amaro (yellow card) 17'	Report	Rodrigo 14', 88'; Luisão (yellow card) 17'; Salvio 30'; Pérez 45'; Nolito 66'	Stadium: Estádio do Bonfim; Attendance: 10,569; Referee: Jorge Sousa

2 September 2012 3	Benfica	3–0	Nacional	Lisbon
20:15 CET (UTC+01)	Cardozo 50', 88'; Rodrigo 56'	Report	Školnik (yellow card) 46'	Stadium: Estádio da Luz; Attendance: 34,695; Referee: Bruno Esteves

23 September 2012 4	Académica	2–2	Benfica	Coimbra
20:15 CET (UTC+01)	Cissé 26' (pen.); Galo (red card) 50'; Dias (yellow card) 55'; Ferreira (yellow card) 61'; Eduardo 68' (pen.); Ogu (yellow card) 77'	Report	Pereira (yellow card) 26'; Melgarejo (yellow card) 55'; Cardozo 51' (pen.); Garay (yellow card) 68'; Lima 86'	Stadium: Estádio Cidade de Coimbra; Attendance: 8,270; Referee: Carlos Xistra

28 September 2012 5	Paços de Ferreira	1–2	Benfica	Paços de Ferreira
20:15 CET (UTC+01)	Cícero 6'; Tony (yellow card) 59'	Report	Lima 8', 71'; Pereira (yellow card) 73'; Artur (yellow card) 90+3'; Gaitán (yellow card) 90+4'	Stadium: Estádio da Mata Real; Attendance: 4,247; Referee: Marco Ferreira

6 October 2012 6	Benfica	2–1	Beira-Mar	Lisbon
20:30 CET (UTC+01)	Pereira 58'; Rodrigo 60' (yellow card) 64'	Report	Sasso 5'	Stadium: Estádio da Luz; Attendance: 28,305; Referee: Rui Costa

27 October 2012 7	Gil Vicente	0–3	Benfica	Barcelos
20:30 CET (UTC+01)	Luís Manuel (yellow card) 36'; Cunha (yellow card) 70'; Pereira (yellow card) 89'	Report	Lima 2'; Matić (yellow card) 21'; Luisinho 26'; Pérez (yellow card) 32' (yellow-red card) 69'; Gomes 45+1'; Bruno César (yellow card) 90+1'	Stadium: Estádio Cidade de Barcelos; Attendance: 7,242; Referee: Vasco Santos

3 November 2012 8	Benfica	3–0	Vitória de Guimarães	Lisbon
20:30 (UTC+01)	Cardozo 36', 47' (pen.); Lima 66'; Gomes (red card) 79'	Report	Defendi (yellow card) 21'; Addy (yellow card) 47'	Stadium: Estádio da Luz; Attendance: 31,543; Referee: João Ferreira

11 November 2012 9	Rio Ave	0–1	Benfica	Vila do Conde
19:30 (UTC+01)	Marcelo (yellow card) 77'	Report	Lima 45+1'; Matić (yellow card) 68'; Almeida (yellow card) 79'; Artur (yellow card) 82'	Stadium: Estádio do Rio Ave FC; Attendance: 5,028; Referee: Bruno Esteves

24 November 2012 10	Benfica	2–0	Olhanense	Lisbon
20:30 (UTC+01)	Cardozo 26' (pen.); Luisão 72'	Report	Fernandes (yellow card) 37'	Stadium: Estádio da Luz; Attendance: 24,104; Referee: Rui Silva

10 December 2012 11	Sporting CP	1–3	Benfica	Lisbon
20:15	Carrillo (yellow card) 69'; Van Wolfswinkel 30'; Boulahrouz (red card) 81'; Rinaudo (yellow card) 84'; Rojo (yellow card) 89'	Report	Pereira (yellow card) 20'; Matić (yellow card) 45'; Cardozo 58', 81' (pen.), 86'	Stadium: Estádio José Alvalade; Attendance: 35,114; Referee: Marco Ferreira

15 December 2012 12	Benfica	4–1	Marítimo	Lisbon
20:30	Gomes (yellow card) 29'; Cardozo 34', 66' (pen.), 69'; Pereira (yellow card) 40'; Melgarejo (yellow card) 70'; Rodrigo 88'	Report	Rodrigo António 25'; Ferreira (yellow card) 34'; Dias (yellow card) 44'; Roberge (yellow card) 55' (yellow-red card) 64'; Fidélis (yellow card) 64'; Sami (yellow card) 90+2'	Stadium: Estádio da Luz; Attendance: 32,519; Referee: Hugo Pacheco

6 January 2013 13	Estoril	1–3	Benfica	Estoril
20:15	Coimbra (yellow card) 16'; Anderson Luís (yellow card) 65'; Santos 89'	Report	Rodrigo (yellow card) 23'; Gaitán 37'; Lima 59'; Pérez (yellow card) 64'; Salvio 66'; Almeida (yellow card) 80'	Stadium: Estádio António Coimbra da Mota; Attendance: 5,015; Referee: Duarte Gomes

13 January 2013 14	Benfica	2–2	Porto	Lisbon
20:15	Matić 9' (yellow card) 63'; Gaitán 16'; Pérez (yellow card) 47'; Pereira (yellow card) 85'	Report	Mangala 7'; Martínez 14'; Moutinho (yellow card) 82'	Stadium: Estádio da Luz; Attendance: 60,556; Referee: João Ferreira

20 January 2013 15	Moreirense	0–2	Benfica	Moreira de Cónegos
20:00	Pintassilgo (yellow card) 28'	Report	Salvio 48'; Lima 71'	Stadium: Parque de Jogos Comendador Joaquim de Almeida Freitas; Attendance: 4,139; Referee: João Capela

27 January 2013 16	Braga	1–2	Benfica	Braga
20:15	Ismaily (yellow card) 61'; João Pedro 71'; Haas (red card) 84'	Report	Salvio 4'; Lima 34'; Matić (yellow card) 51'; Gaitán (yellow card) 72'; Artur (yellow card) 90+2'	Stadium: Estádio Municipal de Braga; Attendance: 17,773; Referee: Bruno Esteves

3 February 2013 17	Benfica	3–0	Vitória de Setúbal	Lisbon
20:15	Pérez 5'; Lima 48'; Rodrigo 56'; Pereira (yellow card) 61'; Gomes (yellow card) 75'	Report	José Pedro (yellow card) 43'	Stadium: Estádio da Luz; Attendance: 38,538; Referee: Vasco Santos

10 February 2013 18	Nacional	2–2	Benfica	Funchal
18:00	Barcelos 6' (yellow card) 90+4'; Marçal (yellow card) 39' (yellow-red card) 90+3'; Mateus 52'; Rodrigues (yellow card) 55'; Gottardi (yellow card) 90+5'	Report	Mexer 15' (o.g.); Urretavizcaya 37'; Cardozo (red card) 90+3'; Matić (red card) 90+6'	Stadium: Estádio da Madeira; Attendance: 4,327; Referee: Pedro Proença

17 February 2013 19	Benfica	1–0	Académica	Lisbon
20:15	Pereira (yellow card) 39'; Lima 90+4' (pen.) (yellow card) 90+4'	Report	Cleyton (yellow card) 50'; Dias (yellow card) 90+3'; Cabral (red card) 90+4'	Stadium: Estádio da Luz; Attendance: 36,306; Referee: Nuno Almeida

24 February 2013 20	Benfica	3–0	Paços de Ferreira	Lisbon
19:15	Pérez 5' (yellow card) 43'; Cardozo 47'; Salvio 84'; Luisinho (yellow card) 90'	Report		Stadium: Estádio da Luz; Attendance: 40,201; Referee: João Capela

3 March 2013 21	Beira-Mar	0–1	Benfica	Aveiro
19:30	Vieira (yellow card) 15'; Sampaio (yellow card) 56'; Jaime (yellow card) 60'; Ribeiro (yellow card) 90+2'	Report	Cardozo 16' (pen.); Melgarejo (yellow card) 87'	Stadium: Estádio Municipal de Aveiro; Attendance: 18,730; Referee: Manuel Mota

10 March 2013 22	Benfica	5–0	Gil Vicente	Lisbon
20:15	Pereira 12'; Salvio 22'; Melgarejo 33'; Lima 64'; Gaitán 90+3'	Report	Cláudio (yellow card) 57'	Stadium: Estádio da Luz; Attendance: 33,706; Referee: Duarte Gomes

17 March 2013 23	Vitória de Guimarães	0–4	Benfica	Guimarães
20:30	El Adoua (yellow card) 36'; Kanú (yellow card) 45+1' (yellow-red card) 60'; Olímpio (yellow card) 54'	Report	Cardozo 38' (pen.) (yellow card) 65'; Garay 61'; Salvio 82'; Rodrigo 90+4'	Stadium: Estádio D. Afonso Henriques; Attendance: 19,395; Referee: Paulo Baptista

30 March 2013 24	Benfica	6–1	Rio Ave	Lisbon
20:30	Melgarejo 11' (yellow card) 77' (yellow-red card) 89'; Matić 15' (yellow card) 83'; Lima 41', 49', 76'; Gaitán (yellow card) 52'; Rodrigo (yellow card) 61'; Pérez 82'; Cardozo (yellow card) 88'	Report	Wíres (yellow card) 8' (yellow-red card) 59'; Ukra (yellow card) 18'; Edimar (yellow card) 41' (yellow-red card) 71'; Tarantini (yellow card) 43'; Hassan 51'	Stadium: Estádio da Luz; Attendance: 45,862; Referee: Rui Costa

7 April 2013 25	Olhanense	0–2	Benfica	Olhão
20:15	Fernandes (yellow card) 32'	Report	Salvio 52'; Matić 64'	Stadium: Estádio José Arcanjo; Attendance: 5,560; Referee: Hugo Miguel

21 April 2013 26	Benfica	2–0	Sporting CP	Lisbon
20:30	Salvio 36'; Luisão (yellow card) 66'; Lima 75'	Report	Viola (yellow card) 84'; Rinaudo (yellow card) 89'	Stadium: Estádio da Luz; Attendance: 62,553; Referee: João Capela

29 April 2013 27	Marítimo	1–2	Benfica	Funchal
20:00	Rosário (yellow card) 4'; Rossi (yellow card) 21' (goal) 42'; Artur (yellow card) 27'	Report	Lima 5' (pen.); Garay (yellow card) 44'; Luisão (yellow card) 67'; Rossi 72' (o.g.); Cardozo (yellow card) 90+2'	Stadium: Estádio dos Barreiros; Attendance: 4,504; Referee: Manuel Mota

6 May 2013 28	Benfica	1–1	Estoril	Lisbon
20:00	Pereira 67'; Martins (yellow card) 69' (yellow-red card) 78'	Report	Evandro (yellow card) 20'; Jefferson 58'; Tavares (yellow card) 90+2'; Vagner (yellow card) 90+3'	Stadium: Estádio da Luz; Attendance: 60,897; Referee: Paulo Baptista

12 May 2013 29	Porto	2–1	Benfica	Porto
20:30	Pereira 25' (o.g.); Rodríguez (yellow card) 56'; Fernando (yellow card) 66'; Defour (yellow card) 80'; Kelvin 90'; Helton (yellow card) 90+3'	Report	Lima 18'; Pérez (yellow card) 46'; Matić (yellow card) 59'; Artur (yellow card) 85'	Stadium: Estádio do Dragão; Attendance: 50,117; Referee: Pedro Proença

19 May 2013 30	Benfica	3–1	Moreirense	Lisbon
18:30	Cardozo (yellow card) 25' (goal) 50'; Lima 80', 90' (pen.); Matić (yellow card) 88'	Report	Vinícius 43'; Diego Gaúcho (yellow card) 60'; Paulinho (red card) 90+1'	Stadium: Estádio da Luz; Attendance: 51,349; Referee: Marco Ferreira

=== Taça de Portugal ===
18 October 2012 Third round	Freamunde	0–4	Benfica	Freamunde, Paços de Ferreira
20:15 CET (UTC+01)		Report	Lima 16'; Cardozo 45'; Salvio 62'; Gomes 74'	Stadium: Complexo Desportivo do SC Freamunde; Referee: Manuel Mota

16 November 2012 Fourth round	Moreirense	0–2	Benfica	Moreira de Cónegos
21:00		Report	Bruno César (yellow card) 25'; Matić (yellow card) 50' (goal) 59'; Cardozo 90+3'	Stadium: Parque de Jogos Comendador Joaquim de Almeida Freitas; Referee: Duarte Gomes

2 January 2013 Fifth round	Benfica	6–0	Desportivo das Aves	Lisbon
20:15	Rodrigo 5', 57'; Cardozo 18', 22', 32'; Lima 73' (pen.)			Stadium: Estádio da Luz; Attendance: 15,713; Referee: Hugo Miguel

16 January 2013 Quarter-finals	Académica	0–4	Benfica	Coimbra
20:15			John 5'; Lima 9', 27'; Salvio 71'	Stadium: Estádio Cidade de Coimbra; Referee: Jorge Sousa

30 January 2013 Semi-finals; First leg	Paços de Ferreira	0–2	Benfica	Paços de Ferreira
20:00 CET (UTC+01)			Lima 58'; John 75'	Stadium: Estádio da Mata Real; Referee: Cosme Machado

17 April 2013 Semi-finals; Second leg	Benfica	1–1 (3–1 agg.)	Paços de Ferreira	Lisbon
20:15 CET (UTC+01)	Cardozo 54'		Cícero 80'	Stadium: Estádio da Luz; Attendance: 17,118; Referee: Bruno Esteves

26 May 2013 final	Vitória de Guimarães	2–1	Benfica	Oeiras
17:00 CET (UTC+01)	Soudani 79'; R. Pereira 81'		Gaitán 30'	Stadium: Estádio Nacional; Attendance: 36,850; Referee: Jorge Sousa

=== Taça da Liga ===
==== Group stage ====
Group D
Team	Pld	W	D	L	GF	GA	GD	Pts
Benfica	3	2	1	0	6	4	+2	7
Moreirense	3	0	3	0	3	3	0	3
Académica	3	0	2	1	4	5	–1	2
Olhanense	3	0	2	1	1	2	–1	2

19 December 2012 1	Olhanense	1–2	Benfica	Olhão
19:45 (UTC+01)	Brandão 48'	Report	Rodrigo 69'; Lima 87'	Stadium: Estádio José Arcanjo; Attendance: 3,213; Referee: Paulo Baptista

30 December 2012 2	Moreirense	1–1	Benfica	Moreira de Cónegos
20:15 (UTC+01)	Ghilas 48'	Report	Cardozo 90+3' (pen.)	Stadium: Parque de Jogos Comendador Joaquim de Almeida Freitas; Referee: Cosme Machado

9 January 2013 3	Benfica	3–2	Académica	Lisbon
19:45	Lima 40', 65'; Alan Kardec 61'	Report	Makelele 45+1'; Saleiro 50'	Stadium: Estádio da Luz; Attendance: 13,872; Referee: Manuel Mota

==== Knockout phase ====
27 February 2013 Semi-finals	Braga	0–0 (3–2 p)	Benfica	Braga
19:45		Report		Stadium: Estádio Municipal de Braga; Referee: Marco Ferreira
	Penalties
	Alan (penalty missed); Custódio (penalty scored); João Pedro (penalty scored); Amorim (penalty scored)		Rodrigo (penalty scored); Luisão (penalty missed); Pérez (penalty scored); Roderick (penalty missed); Gaitán (penalty missed)

=== UEFA Champions League ===
==== Group stage ====
Group G
Team	Pld	W	D	L	GF	GA	GD	Pts
(Spain) Barcelona	6	4	1	1	11	5	+6	13
(Scotland) Celtic	6	3	1	2	9	8	+1	10
(Portugal) Benfica	6	2	2	2	5	5	0	8
(Russia) Spartak Moscow	6	1	0	5	7	14	−7	3

19 September 2012 1	Celtic (Scotland)	0–0	(Portugal) Benfica	Glasgow, Scotland
20:45 CEST	Wanyama (yellow card) 21'; Izaguirre (yellow card) 34'; Brown (yellow card) 89'	Report	Matić (yellow card) 47'; Aimar (yellow card) 57'; Bruno César (yellow card) 90+2'	Stadium: Celtic Park; Attendance: 57,759; Referee: Nicola Rizzoli (Italy)

2 October 2012 2	Benfica (Portugal)	0–2	(Spain) Barcelona	Lisbon, Portugal
20:45 CEST	Bruno César (yellow card) 38'; Martins (yellow card) 84'; Matić (yellow card) 86'; Jardel (yellow card) 89'	Report	Sánchez 6'; Pedro (yellow card) 28'; Fàbregas (yellow card) 19' (goal) 56'; Busquets (red card) 88'	Stadium: Estádio da Luz; Attendance: 63,847; Referee: Cüneyt Çakır (Turkey)

23 October 2012 3	Spartak Moscow (Russia)	2–1	(Portugal) Benfica	Moscow, Russia
18:00 CEST	Rafael Carioca 3'; Suchý (yellow card) 45'; Jardel 43' (o.g.); Welliton (yellow card) 90+2'; Ari (yellow card) 90+4'	Report	Lima 33'; Cardozo (yellow card) 72'; Matić (yellow card) 76'	Stadium: Luzhniki Stadium; Attendance: 41,237; Referee: Mark Clattenburg (England)

7 November 2012 4	Benfica (Portugal)	2–0	(Russia) Spartak Moscow	Lisbon, Portugal
20:45 CET	Almeida (yellow card) 29'; Cardozo 55', 69'	Report	Rebrov (yellow card) 32'; Makeyev (yellow card) 33'; Pareja (yellow card) 38' (yellow-red card) 76'; Jurado (yellow card) 82'	Stadium: Estádio da Luz; Attendance: 36,448; Referee: Florian Meyer (Germany)

20 November 2012 5	Benfica (Portugal)	2–1	(Scotland) Celtic	Lisbon, Portugal
20:45 CET	John 7'; Garay 71'; Melgarejo (yellow card) 77'; Almeida (yellow card) 90+1'	Report	Samaras 32' (yellow card) 38'; Ledley (yellow card) 48'; Wanyama (yellow card) 85'	Stadium: Estádio da Luz; Attendance: 47,065; Referee: Viktor Kassai (Hungary)

5 December 2012 6	Barcelona (Spain)	0–0	(Portugal) Benfica	Barcelona, Spain
20:45 CET	Rafinha (yellow card) 49'; Adriano (yellow card) 60'	Report	Nolito (yellow card) 43'; Garay (yellow card) 56'; Luisão (yellow card) 59'; Matić (yellow card) 78'	Stadium: Camp Nou; Attendance: 50,659; Referee: Svein Oddvar Moen (Norway)

=== UEFA Europa League ===
==== Knockout phase ====
===== Round of 32 =====
14 February 2013 First leg	Bayer Leverkusen (Germany)	0–1	(Portugal) Benfica	Leverkusen, Germany
18:00	Bender (yellow card) 53'; Kießling (yellow card) 73'; Milik (yellow card) 81'	Report	Melgarejo (yellow card) 45'; Cardozo 61'; Gaitán (yellow card) 73'	Stadium: BayArena; Referee: Antonio Mateu Lahoz (Spain)

21 February 2013 Second leg	Benfica (Portugal)	2–1 (3–1 agg.)	(Germany) Bayer Leverkusen	Lisbon, Portugal
20:05	Pérez (yellow card) 55'; John 60' (yellow card) 60'; Matić 77' (yellow card) 90+3'	Report	Bender (yellow card) 28'; Carvajal (yellow card) 45+2'; Schürrle 75'	Stadium: Estádio da Luz; Attendance: 35,000; Referee: Pavel Královec (Czech Republic)

===== Round of 16 =====
7 March 2013 First leg	Benfica (Portugal)	1–0	(France) Bordeaux	Lisbon, Portugal
20:15	Carrasso 21' (o.g.); Martins (yellow card) 50'; Rodrigo (yellow card) 53'	Report		Stadium: Estádio da Luz; Attendance: 47,000; Referee: Alon Yefet (Israel)

14 March 2013 Second leg	Bordeaux (France)	2–3 (2–4 agg.)	(Portugal) Benfica	Bordeaux, France
21:05	Henrique (yellow card) 10'; Obraniak (yellow card) 31'; Diabaté 74'; Ben Khalfallah (yellow card) 77'; Jardel 90+1' (o.g.)	Report	Jardel 30'; Roderick (yellow card) 52'; Cardozo 75', 90+2'; John (yellow card) 83'; Pereira (yellow card) 90'	Stadium: Stade Chaban-Delmas; Referee: Ovidiu Hațegan (Romania)

===== Quarter-finals =====
4 April 2013 First leg	Benfica (Portugal)	3–1	(England) Newcastle United	Lisbon, Portugal
21:05	Rodrigo 25'; Lima 65'; Cardozo 71' (pen.); Pérez (yellow card) 73'	Report	Cissé 12'; Perch (yellow card) 20'; Sh. Ameobi (yellow card) 87'	Stadium: Estádio da Luz; Attendance: 44,133; Referee: Antony Gautier (France)

11 April 2013 Second leg	Newcastle United (England)	1–1 (2–4 agg.)	(Portugal) Benfica	Newcastle upon Tyne, England
21:05	Cissé (yellow card) 67' (goal) 71'; Cabaye (yellow card) 70'; Yanga-Mbiwa (yellow card) 81'; Williamson (yellow card) 83'	Report	Artur (yellow card) 32'; Pérez (yellow card) 32'; Almeida (yellow card) 49'; Salvio 90+2'	Stadium: St James' Park; Attendance: 52,157; Referee: Ivan Bebek (Croatia)

===== Semi-finals =====
25 April 2013 First leg	Fenerbahçe (Turkey)	1–0	(Portugal) Benfica	Istanbul, Turkey
21:05	Cristian (yellow card) 38'; Topal (yellow card) 50'; Korkmaz 72'; Webó (yellow card) 90'	Report	Gomes (yellow card) 31'; Aimar (yellow card) 37'; Pereira (yellow card) 41'; John (yellow card) 45+1'	Stadium: Şükrü Saracoğlu Stadium; Attendance: 51,000; Referee: Milorad Mažić (Serbia)

2 May 2013 Second leg	Benfica (Portugal)	3–1 (3–2 agg.)	(Turkey) Fenerbahçe	Lisbon, Portugal
21:05	Gaitán 9'; Pereira (yellow card) 28'; Pérez (yellow card) 33'; Cardozo 35', 66'	Report	Kuyt 23' (pen.); Cristian (yellow card) 30'; Erkin (yellow card) 85'	Stadium: Estádio da Luz; Attendance: 55,402; Referee: Stéphane Lannoy (France)

===== Final =====
15 May 2013 Final	Benfica (Portugal)	1–2	(England) Chelsea	Amsterdam, Netherlands
20:45 CET (UTC+01)	Cardozo 68' (pen.)	Report	Torres 60'; Ivanović 90+3'	Stadium: Amsterdam Arena; Attendance: 46,163; Referee: Björn Kuipers (Netherlands)

=== Overall record ===
As of 26 May 2013

Competition	First match	Last match	Record								
Competition	First match	Last match	G	W	D	L	GF	GA	GD	Win %	Source
Primeira Liga	18 August 2012	19 May 2013	30	24	5	1	77	20	+57	80.00	
Taça de Portugal	18 October 2012	26 May 2013	7	5	1	1	20	3	+17	71.43	
Taça da Liga	19 December 2012	27 February 2013	4	2	2	0	6	4	+2	50.00	Taça da Liga results
UEFA Champions League	19 September 2012	5 December 2012	6	2	2	2	5	5	+0	33.33	
UEFA Europa League	14 February 2013	15 May 2013	9	6	1	2	15	9	+6	66.67	
Total			56	39	11	6	123	41	+82	69.64	

== Players ==
=== Statistics ===
No.	Pos	Nat	Player	Total		Primeira Liga		Portuguese Cup		League Cup		Europe^{2}	
No.	Pos	Nat	Player	Apps	Goals	Apps	Goals	Apps	Goals	Apps	Goals	Apps	Goals
Goalkeepers
1	GK	(Brazil) BRA	Artur	50	0	30	0	4	0	1	0	15	0
13	GK	(Portugal) POR	Paulo Lopes	5	0	0	0	2	0	3	0	0	0
64	GK	(Brazil) BRA	Júlio César	0	0	0	0	0	0	0	0	0	0
Defenders
14	DF	(Uruguay) URU	Maxi Pereira	41	3	28	3	4	0	1	0	8	0
4	DF	(Brazil) BRA	Luisão	33	1	18	1	5	0	1	0	9	0
24	DF	(Argentina) ARG	Ezequiel Garay	46	2	27	1	4	0	1	0	14	1
33	DF	(Brazil) BRA	Jardel	34	0	16	0	4	0	4	0	10	0
27	DF	(Portugal) POR	Miguel Vítor	1	0	1	0	0	0	0	0	0	0
3	DF	(Portugal) POR	Roderick	7	0	2	0	0	0	2	0	3	0
25	DF	(Paraguay) PAR	Lorenzo Melgarejo	40	2	21	2	3	0	2	0	14	0
5	DF	(Portugal) POR	Luisinho	10	1	5	1	3	0	2	0	0	0
75	DF	(Brazil) BRA	Sidnei	2	0	0	0	1	0	1	0	0	0
Midfielders
21	MF	(Serbia) SRB	Nemanja Matić	47	5	26	3	7	1	1	0	13	1
34	DF	(Portugal) POR	André Almeida	34	0	14	0	5	0	3	0	12	0
20	MF	(Argentina) ARG	Nicolás Gaitán	44	5	23	3	6	1	2	0	13	1
15	MF	(Netherlands) NED	Ola John	42	4	22	0	4	2	4	0	12	2
10	MF	(Argentina) ARG	Pablo Aimar	21	0	13	0	3	0	2	0	3	0
17	MF	(Portugal) POR	Carlos Martins	22	0	13	0	2	0	2	0	5	0
18	MF	(Argentina) ARG	Eduardo Salvio	51	13	29	10	6	2	3	0	13	1
35	MF	(Argentina) ARG	Enzo Pérez	47	4	28	4	3	0	3	0	13	0
89	MF	(Portugal) POR	André Gomes	18	2	7	1	4	1	2	0	5	0
23	MF	(Uruguay) URU	Jonathan Urretavizcaya	8	1	4	1	1	0	1	0	2	0
Strikers
7	FW	(Paraguay) PAR	Óscar Cardozo	47	33	25	17	6	6	2	1	14	9
19	FW	(Spain) ESP	Rodrigo	39	11	20	7	6	2	3	1	10	1
31	FW	(Brazil) BRA	Alan Kardec	5	1	3	0	1	0	1	1	0	0
11	FW	(Brazil) BRA	Lima	49	30	27	20	7	5	3	3	12	2
No longer at club^{1}
6	MF	(Spain) ESP	Javi García	2	0	2	0	0	0	0	0	0	0
28	MF	(Belgium) BEL	Axel Witsel	3	0	3	0	0	0	0	0	0	0
12	FW	(Portugal) POR	Yannick Djaló	0	0	0	0	0	0	0	0	0	0
8	MF	(Brazil) BRA	Bruno César	15	0	6	0	3	0	2	0	4	0
9	MF	(Spain) ESP	Nolito	15	1	6	1	3	0	3	0	3	0
30	FW	(Argentina) ARG	Javier Saviola	0	0	0	0	0	0	0	0	0	0
40	FW	(Brazil) BRA	Michel	0	0	0	0	0	0	0	0	0	0

- 1.Players who were in the squad at the time of the first competitive fixture.
- 2.Also includes 2012–13 UEFA Champions League and 2012–13 UEFA Europa League.

=== Transfers ===
==== In ====
No.	Pos.	Name	Age	Moving from	Type	Transfer Window	Contract ends	Transfer fee	Sources
13	GK	(Portugal) Paulo Lopes	34	(Portugal) Gil Vicente	Transfer	Summer	2014	Free	
5	DF	(Portugal) Luisinho	27	(Portugal) Paços de Ferreira	Transfer	Summer	2016	€1,000,000	
25	DF	(Paraguay) Lorenzo Melgarejo	21	(Portugal) Paços de Ferreira	Loan return	Summer	2016	-	
17	MF	(Portugal) Carlos Martins	30	(Spain) Granada	Loan return	Summer	2016	-	
15	MF	(Netherlands) Ola John	21	(Netherlands) Twente	Transfer	Summer	2018	€9,150,000	
18	MF	(Argentina) Eduardo Salvio	22	(Spain) Atlético Madrid	Transfer	Summer	2018	€14,550,000	
35	MF	(Argentina) Enzo Pérez	27	(Argentina) Estudiantes	Loan return	Summer	2016	-	
31	FW	(Brazil) Alan Kardec	23	(Brazil) Santos	Loan return	Summer	2015	-	
40	FW	(Brazil) Michel	25	(Portugal) Paços de Ferreira	Transfer	Summer	2017	€1,000,000	
70	FW	(Portugal) Hugo Vieira	23	(Portugal) Gil Vicente	Transfer	Summer	2016	€155,850	
11	FW	(Brazil) Lima	29	(Portugal) Braga	Transfer	Summer	2016	€4,840,000	
3	DF	(Portugal) Roderick	21	(Spain) Deportivo La Coruña	Loan return	Winter	2018	-	

==== Out ====
No.	Pos.	Name	Age	Moving to	Type	Transfer Window	Transfer fee	Sources
-	DF	(Brazil) Emerson	27	(Turkey) Trabzonspor	Transfer	Summer	€1,600,000	
-	DF	(Denmark) Daniel Wass	23	(France) Evian	Transfer	Summer	€1,000,000	
-	MF	(Brazil) Fellipe Bastos	23	(Brazil) Vasco da Gama	Transfer	Summer	€300,000	
-	MF	(Spain) Javi García	25	(England) Manchester City	Transfer	Summer	€20,000,000 + €3,000,000 in add-ons	
-	MF	(Belgium) Axel Witsel	23	(Russia) Zenit Saint Petersburg	Transfer	Summer	€40,000,000	
-	MF	(Ghana) Ishmael Yartey	22	(France) Sochaux	Transfer	Summer	€1,500,000	
-	FW	(Brazil) Éder Luís	27	(Brazil) Vasco da Gama	Transfer	Summer	€3,000,000	
-	FW	(Spain) Joan Capdevila	34	(Spain) Espanyol	Transfer	Summer	€500,000	
-	FW	(Portugal) Hélio Vaz	23	(Portugal) União de Leiria	Transfer	Summer	Free	
-	FW	(Argentina) Javier Saviola	30	(Spain) Málaga	Transfer	Summer	Free	
-	GK	(Slovenia) Jan Oblak	19	(Portugal) Rio Ave	Loan	Summer	-	
-	DF	(Portugal) Roderick	20	(Spain) Deportivo La Coruña	Loan	Summer	-	
-	DF	(Brazil) Léo Kanu	24	(Brazil) Ponte Preta	Loan	Summer	-	
-	MF	(Brazil) Airton	24	(Brazil) Flamengo	Loan	Summer	-	
-	MF	(Portugal) Ruben Amorim	26	(Portugal) Braga	Loan	Winter	-	
-	MF	(Brazil) Felipe Menezes	24	(Brazil) Sport Recife	Loan	Summer	-	
-	MF	(Brazil) Diego Lopes	18	(Portugal) Rio Ave	Loan	Summer	-	
-	MF	(Portugal) David Simão	23	(Portugal) Marítimo	Loan	Summer	-	
-	MF	(Portugal) Nuno Coelho	24	(Greece) Aris	Loan	Summer	-	
-	FW	(Portugal) Nélson Oliveira	21	(Spain) Deportivo La Coruña	Loan	Summer	-	
-	FW	(Argentina) Franco Jara	24	(Argentina) San Lorenzo	Loan	Summer	-	
-	FW	(Uruguay) Rodrigo Mora	25	(Argentina) River Plate	Loan	Summer	-	
-	FW	(Portugal) Hugo Vieira	24	(Spain) Sporting de Gijón	Loan	Summer	-	
-	FW	(Portugal) Yannick Djaló	26	(France) Toulouse	Loan	Summer	-	
-	FW	(Argentina) José Luis Fernández	26	(Portugal) Olhanense	Loan	Summer	-	
-	FW	(Brazil) Michel	26	(Portugal) Braga	Loan	Summer	-	
-	GK	(Portugal) Eduardo	30	(Italy) Genoa	Loan return	Summer	-	
-	FW	(Argentina) José Luis Fernández	26	(Argentina) Godoy Cruz	Loan	Winter	-	
-	DF	(Brazil) Léo Kanu	25	(Brazil) Grêmio Osasco	Loan	Winter	-	
8	MF	(Brazil) Bruno César	24	(Saudi Arabia) Al-Ahli	Transfer	Winter	€5,000,000	
-	FW	(Portugal) Hugo Vieira	24	(Portugal) Gil Vicente	Loan	Winter	-	
-	FW	(Spain) Nolito	26	(Spain) Granada	Loan	Winter	€600,000	
-	MF	(Brazil) Airton	24	(Brazil) Internacional	Loan	Winter	-	
-	DF	(Portugal) Fábio Faria	24	-	Career termination	-	-	
