= 2013 Taça de Portugal final =

- Event: 2012–13 Taça de Portugal
Benfica	Vitória de Guimarães
1	2
- Date: 26 May 2013
- Venue: Estádio Nacional, Oeiras
- Man of the Match: Ricardo Pereira (V. Guimarães)
- Fair Player of the Match: Paulo Oliveira (V. Guimarães)
- Referee: Jorge Sousa
- Attendance: 36,850
- Weather: Partly cloudy 15 °C (59 °F)

The 2013 Taça de Portugal final was the final match of the 2012–13 Taça de Portugal, the 73rd season of the Taça de Portugal, the premier Portuguese football cup competition organized by the Portuguese Football Federation (FPF). The match was played on 26 May 2013 at the Estádio Nacional in Oeiras, and opposed Benfica and Vitória de Guimarães. Vitória defeated Benfica 2–1 and secured their first title in the competition after five previous failed appearances in the final. In Portugal, the final was televised live in HD on RTP1 and Sport TV.

As a result of winning the Taça de Portugal, Vitória claimed €300,000 in prize money. As the winners, Vitória de Guimarães qualified for the group stage of the 2013–14 UEFA Europa League, and played against Porto, the winners of the 2012–13 Primeira Liga, in the 2013 Supertaça Cândido de Oliveira.

== Background ==
Benfica were appearing in their 34th Taça de Portugal final. Benfica went into the match as 24-time winners (1940, 1943, 1944, 1949, 1951, 1952, 1953, 1955, 1957, 1959, 1962, 1964, 1969, 1970, 1972, 1980, 1981, 1983, 1985, 1986, 1987, 1993, 1996, 2004). Of their 33 Taça de Portugal final appearances, they had lost 9 times (1939, 1958, 1965, 1971, 1974, 1975, 1989, 1997, 2005). Benfica's last Taça de Portugal final appearance was in 2005, against Vitória de Setúbal. The sadinos defeated the encarnados 2–1. Vitória de Guimarães were appearing in their sixth Taça de Portugal final. They had previously lost all five finals (1942, 1963, 1976, 1988, 2011). The Vimaranenses last Taça de Portugal final appearance was the 2011 final against Porto, where they lost 6–2.

In Benfica's and Vitória de Guimarães' entire history, the two teams had met on 152 different occasions. Benfica had accumulated 104 victories while Vitória de Guimarães had accumulated 24 victories. Of those 152 encounters, 24 of those games had ended in a draw. The last meeting between these two sides in this competition was a fourth round tie in the 2009–10 edition, where the Conquistadores defeated Benfica at the Estádio da Luz. The last meeting between these two sides, prior to this encounter was a domestic league match, which took place on 17 March. Benfica defeated their opponents 4–0 at the Estádio D. Afonso Henriques.

== Route to the final ==
=== Benfica ===
Round	Opponents	Score
3	Freamunde (A)	0–4
4	Moreirense (A)	0–2
5	Desportivo das Aves (H)	6–0
QF	Académica de Coimbra (A)	0–4
SF	Paços de Ferreira (A)	0–2
SF	Paços de Ferreira (H)	1–1

As a Primeira Liga team, Benfica entered the 2012–13 Taça de Portugal in the third round, where they were drawn in an away tie against Segunda Liga side Freamunde at the Complexo Desportivo do SC Freamunde. Benfica comfortably defeated the second division side 4–0, with goals from Lima, Óscar Cardozo, Eduardo Salvio and André Gomes. Fellow Primeira Liga side Moreirense, were Benfica's opponents in the fourth round. The match which took place at the Parque de Jogos Comendador Joaquim de Almeida Freitas, saw Benfica defeat the side from Moreira de Cónegos, 2–0. A goal near the hour mark through Serbian midfielder Nemanja Matić, and an injury time strike from Óscar Cardozo granted Benfica safe passage to the fifth round.

Benfica were drawn to play at home against Desportivo das Aves in the fifth round. Despite Desportivo das Aves being a second division side, Benfica's coach Jorge Jesus opted for a strong starting line-up with first team regulars Artur, Ezequiel Garay, Maxi Pereira and Nicolás Gaitán being selected over players who had primarily been used by Jorge Jesus for the cup competition. Jesus' strong starting XI would pay off as Benfica would demolish the opposition 6–0, with a hat-trick from Óscar Cardozo, a brace from Rodrigo and a second-half penalty from Lima. The Encarnados faced cup holders Académica de Coimbra at the Estádio Cidade de Coimbra in the quarter-finals. For a second consecutive cup match, Jorge Jesus utilized another strong side to take on the Coimbra side. Benfica would defeat their opponents 4–0. Benfica's passage to the next round was pretty much sealed within the first twenty seven minutes, after Ola John opened the scoring and Brazilian striker Lima would score two. Argentine winger Eduardo Salvio would close the scoring in the second half.

For the semi-finals, Benfica were drawn against fellow Primeira Liga side Paços de Ferreira. The semi-finals were contested over two legs with the first leg taking place at Paços de Ferreira's Estádio da Mata Real. The first half of the first leg saw Benfica dominate possession but not break threw Paços de Ferreira's defense, but the second half proved to be different. Benfica broke the dead lock on 58 minutes, after Eduardo Salvio obtained the ball on the right hand side and took on Paços' Vitorino Antunes, where Salvio crossed the ball to an unmarked Lima to tap in Benfica's first goal of the game. Benfica's second came on 75 minutes threw substitute Ola John. The goal arose after Rodrigo's shot was saved by Cássio, and John followed up to tap in Benfica's second to take a two-goal advantage back to Estádio da Luz. Benfica's first leg win had marked five consecutive cup games where Benfica had kept clean sheets. The return leg in Lisbon was played in mid April, over two months after the first leg. The game saw the home side not take many risks, while the away side opted for an attacking approach in order to reduce the two goal deficit. After a quite first half, Benfica broke the deadlock in the second half near the hour mark through Óscar Cardozo to score his sixth overall goal of the competition. Paços would tie the game ten minutes from the end threw Cícero. The game would end tied, and Benfica would win the tie 3–1 on aggregate to progress to the final for the first time since 2005.

=== Vitória de Guimarães ===
Round	Opponents	Score
3	Vilaverdense (H)	6–1
4	Vitória de Setúbal (A)	2–2 (aet), 3–5 p
5	Marítimo (A)	1–1 (aet), 4–5 p
QF	Braga (H)	2–1 (aet)
SF	Belenenses (A)	0–2
SF	Belenenses (H)	1–0

Just like their opponents, Vitória de Guimarães entered the 2012–13 Taça de Portugal in the third round, where they were drawn in a home tie against third division side Vilaverdense. The Vimaranenses defeated their opposition 6–1 thanks to braces from Hillal Soudani, Marcelo Toscano and Ricardo Pereira. Fellow Primeira Liga side Vitória de Setúbal were Vitória de Guimarães' opponents in the fourth round. Played at the Estádio do Bonfim, the game was heavily contested which featured four goals. The home side scored first through Cameroonian striker Albert Meyong on 13 minutes. João Ribeiro equalized from the penalty spot on 50 minutes for Vitória de Guimarães. The 1–1 result would require extra-time to settle a winner. Six minutes from the end in extra-time, Freire would give the away side the advantage, but the home side would equalize a minute later through Jorginho which would require the tie to be settled by a penalty shootout. Vitória de Guimarães would win the penalty shootout, 5–3 after Setúbal's Albert Meyong missed his spot kick.

The fifth round saw the Conquistadores face another Primeira Liga side which was Marítimo. The fifth round cup tie saw the away side face another penalty shootout for a second consecutive match. The match went to penalties after each side were tied after 120 minutes. Marítimo scored the first goal of the game on nine minutes through Fidélis, and Vitória de Guimarães would equalize in the second half through Ricardo Pereira. After each side had taken six penalties each, the score was tied 4–4. João Diogo missed Marítimo's seven spot kick, and Amido Baldé converted his penalty kick to send his side to the quarter-finals. The quarter finals saw a home tie against Minho rivals Braga. Despite both sides competing for a European place in the domestic league, both managers opted for strong starting line-ups in order to win the tie. The game opened up with an early goal. The first goal of the game came in the first minute as Braga's Ismaily played the ball into his own penalty box where Uruguayan midfielder Jean Barrientos intercepted, and scored the first goal of the game from ten yards out. The Vimaranenses would go in at half time with a goal advantage. The second half began with the away side applying the pressure on their opposition to score an equalizer. As the game drew to a close, Braga's manager José Peseiro opted to play with an extra center forward and one less defender in order to take the game to extra-time. Peseiro's risk would pay off as Braga's Eder would score equalizer five minutes from the end. Eder's goal would force extra-time to settle the tie. Extra-time opened up with a goal from Jean Barrientos, who would score his second of the match. Vitória de Guimarães would hold on in extra-time and win 2–1 and book their place in the semi-final.

For the semi-finals, Vitória de Guimarães were drawn against the lowest ranked team still active in the competition which were Belenenses of the Segunda Liga. The semi-finals were played over two legs with the first leg taking place at the Estádio do Restelo. The first leg was primarily dominated by the home side but the away side where more clinical in front of goal and managed to score a goal in each half to take a two-goal advantage back to the Estádio D. Afonso Henriques for the second leg. Ricardo Pereira would score both goals, his fourth and fifth goals of the campaign. His first came about from a long ball in which he capitalized on a Belenenses defensive mistake and found himself unmarked in the penalty box to beat Belenenses' Matt Jones. His second came in the 76th minute as he headed the ball into the net from a free kick on the edge of the box. The return leg in Guimarães saw the Vimaranenses win 1–0 with a 14th-minute goal from Marco Matias, and thus win the tie 3–0 on aggregate to progress to the final for the first time since 2011.

== Pre-match ==
=== Officials ===
Match officials were confirmed on 21 May, when Jorge Sousa of Porto was named the referee for the final. This was the first time that Sousa officiated a final of the Taça de Portugal. Sousa was assisted by Bertino Miranda of Porto and Álvaro Mesquita of Vila Real while the fourth official was Bruno Esteves of Setúbal.

=== Ticketing ===
Tickets for the final went on sale on 12 May. The FPF allocated tickets for both finalist clubs varying in price between of €15 and €30. On the 13 May, the FPF announced that all tickets for the final had been sold after only one day after its release to the public.

=== Venue ===
Traditionally the final of the Taça de Portugal has been played at the Estádio Nacional in Oeiras since 1946. Five cup finals since the inauguration of the stadium in the 1940s have been played outside the Estádio Nacional. In January 2013, President of the Portuguese Football Federation Fernando Gomes announced his concerns over the conditions of the Estádio Nacional. He expressed his desire for the final to be held elsewhere.

Following Gomes' announcements, the Portuguese Football Federation sent a letter to the Secretary of State of Sport and Youth Alexandre Mestre, where the FPF expressed its concerns over the current conditions of the Estádio Nacional. The FPF cited the degradation of the internal and external conditions of the stadium as it main concerns. The FPF proposed renovations that needed to take place in order for the stadium to play host to the final.

On 30 January 2013, Minister of Parliamentary Affairs Miguel Relvas publicly announced to newspaper A Bola that the final of the cup should be hosted at the Jamor. Relvas went on to say that the government and the Portuguese Football Federation (FPF) agreed that the stadium should hold the Portuguese Cup final, but in order to do so major improvements need to be made in order to host the game. On 4 February, the Portuguese Federation announced the final to be held at the Jamor. On 5 February, Secretary of State of Sport and Youth Alexandre Mestre announced that the Portuguese government would invest €2.3 million into the stadium to improve its facilities with work to commence following Mestre's announcement and to conclude before May so that it can be ready to host the final of the Taça de Portugal.

== Match ==
=== Details ===
26 May 2013
17:15 WEST

Benfica	1–2	Vitória de Guimarães
Gaitán 30'	Report	Soudani 80'; Pereira 82'

Estádio Nacional, Oeiras
Attendance: 36,850
Referee: Jorge Sousa

Benfica	Vitória de Guimarães

GK	1	(Brazil) Artur
RB	14	(Uruguay) Maxi Pereira
CB	4	(Brazil) Luisão (c)
CB	24	(Argentina) Ezequiel Garay
LB	34	(Portugal) André Almeida
RM	18	(Argentina) Eduardo Salvio	(yellow card) 84'
CM	21	(Serbia) Nemanja Matić	(yellow card) 34'
CM	35	(Argentina) Enzo Pérez	(yellow card) 41'	(substituted off) 87'
LM	20	(Argentina) Nicolás Gaitán		(substituted off) 84'
CF	11	(Brazil) Lima
CF	7	(Paraguay) Óscar Cardozo		(substituted off) 70'
Substitutes:
GK	13	(Portugal) Paulo Lopes
DF	25	(Paraguay) Lorenzo Melgarejo
DF	33	(Brazil) Jardel
MF	10	(Argentina) Pablo Aimar		(substituted on) 87'
MF	23	(Uruguay) Jonathan Urretaviscaya		(substituted on) 70'
MF	89	(Portugal) André Gomes
FW	19	(Spain) Rodrigo		(substituted on) 84'
Manager:
(Portugal) Jorge Jesus

GK	1	(Brazil) Douglas
RB	51	(Brazil) Kanú		(substituted off) 64'
CB	15	(Portugal) Paulo Oliveira
CB	5	(Morocco) Issam El Adoua
LB	30	(Ghana) David Addy	(yellow card) 74'
CM	11	(Portugal) André André
CM	18	(Brazil) Leonel Olímpio (c)		(substituted off) 77'
RM	21	(Portugal) Ricardo Pereira
AM	42	(Portugal) Tiago Rodrigues
LM	22	(Algeria) Hillal Soudani
CF	17	(Portugal) Amido Baldé	(yellow card) 17'	(substituted off) 90+2'
Substitutes:
GK	13	(Brazil) Assis
DF	4	(Mali) Mahamadou N'Diaye		(substituted on) 90+2'
DF	19	(Portugal) Alex
MF	14	(Uruguay) Jean Barrientos
MF	50	(Brazil) Rafael Crivellaro
FW	7	(Portugal) João Ribeiro		(substituted on) 77'
FW	9	(Portugal) Marco Matias		(substituted on) 64'
Manager:
(Portugal) Rui Vitória

2012–13 Taça de Portugal Winners
Vitória de Guimarães
1st Title

Man of the match

- (Portugal) Ricardo Pereira (Vitória de Guimarães)

Match officials

- Assistant referees:
  - Bertino Miranda (Porto)
  - Álvaro Mesquita (Vila Real)
- Fourth official: Bruno Esteves (Setúbal)

Match rules

- 90 minutes
- Penalty shoot-out if scores level after 90 minutes
- Seven named substitutes
- Maximum of three substitutions

=== Statistics ===
Overall
Statistic	Benfica	Vitória de Guimarães
Goals scored	1	2
Total shots	8	9
Shots on target	3	5
Ball possession	55%	45%
Corner kicks	8	0
Fouls committed	16	25
Offsides	3	5
Yellow cards	3	2
Red cards	0	0

== See also ==
- 2012–13 S.L. Benfica season
- 2013 Taça da Liga final
