= Kanu =

Kanu or KANU may refer to:

== People ==
- Kanú (footballer, born 1983), full name Elias de Oliveira Rosa, Brazilian footballer
- Kanu (footballer, born 1984), full name António Eduardo Pereira dos Santos, Brazilian footballer
- Kanu (footballer, born 1987), full name Rubenilson dos Santos da Rocha, Brazilian footballer
- Kanú (footballer, born 1992), full name Alexandre Valério, Brazilian footballer
- Christopher Kanu (born 1979), Nigerian footballer
- Hero Kanu (born 2004), German-American football player
- Mohamed Kanu (born 1968), Sierra Leonean footballer
- Ndubuisi Kanu (1943–2021), Nigerian politician
- Nwankwo Kanu (born 1976), Nigerian footballer
- Uchenna Kanu (born 1997), Nigerian footballer
- Hal Robson-Kanu (born 1989), Welsh footballer

== Other uses ==
- Kanu (caste), a caste in India
- KANU (FM), a radio station in Lawrence, Kansas, United States
- Kanu (play), a kabuki play included in the Kabuki Jūhachiban
- Kenya African National Union, a political party
