= 2012 Polish Masters =

Tournament details
- Host country: Poland
- Dates: July 21 – July 22
- Teams: 4 (from 1 confederation)
- Venue: 1 (in 1 host city)

Final positions
- Champions: (Netherlands) PSV Eindhoven (1st title)
- Runners-up: (Portugal) Benfica
- Third place: (Spain) Athletic Bilbao
- Fourth place: (Poland) Śląsk Wrocław

Tournament statistics
- Matches played: 4
- Goals scored: 12 (3 per match)
- Top scorer(s): (Portugal) Carlos Martins (Netherlands) Georginio Wijnaldum (2 goals each)

The 2012 Polish Masters was an exhibition international club football (soccer) competition featuring football club teams from Europe, which was held in July 2012. All matches were played in Stadion Miejski in Wrocław, Poland. This was the first Polish Masters.

== Teams ==
The following four clubs participated in the 2012 tournament:

- (Poland) Śląsk Wrocław
- (Netherlands) PSV Eindhoven
- (Spain) Athletic Bilbao
- (Portugal) S.L. Benfica

== Matches ==
On July 20, the draw for the semi-final pairs took place during a press conference with coaches and players of all teams. The winners will play in the finals and the loser of the match for 3rd place.

Semi-finals
21 July – Wrocław
(Spain) Athletic Bilbao	0
(Netherlands) PSV Eindhoven	1
21 July – Wrocław
(Poland) Śląsk Wrocław	2
(Portugal) S.L. Benfica	4

Final
22 July – Wrocław
(Netherlands) PSV Eindhoven	3
(Portugal) S.L. Benfica	1
Third place
22 July – Wrocław
(Spain) Athletic Bilbao	1
(Poland) Śląsk Wrocław	0

=== Semi-finals ===
July 21, 2012
13:00 UTC

(Spain) Athletic Bilbao	0–1	PSV Eindhoven (Netherlands)
		73' Wijnaldum

Stadion Miejski, Wrocław, Poland
Attendance: 15,000
Referee: (Poland) Sebastian Tarnowski
July 21, 2012
16:00 UTC

(Poland) Śląsk Wrocław	2–4	S.L. Benfica (Portugal)
Elsner 67'; Sobota 69'		11' Cardozo; 60' Luisão; 73' Carlos Martins; 89' Gaitán

Stadion Miejski, Wrocław, Poland
Attendance: 30,000
Referee: (Poland) Robert Małek

=== Third-place ===
July 22, 2012
10:45 UTC

(Spain) Athletic Bilbao	1–0	Śląsk Wrocław (Poland)
Susaeta 43'

Stadion Miejski, Wrocław, Poland
Attendance: 15,000
Referee: (Poland) Marek Opaliński

=== Final ===
July 22, 2012
13:45 UTC

(Netherlands) PSV Eindhoven	3–1	S.L. Benfica (Portugal)
Jørgensen 54'; Lens 74'; Wijnaldum 83'		34' Carlos Martins

Stadion Miejski, Wrocław, Poland
Attendance: 15,000
Referee: (Poland) Tomasz Garbowski

Eindhoven	Benfica

== Top scores ==
2 goals

- (Netherlands) Georginio Wijnaldum (PSV Eindhoven)
- (Portugal) Carlos Martins (Benfica)

1 goal

- (Slovenia) Rok Elsner (Śląsk Wrocław)
- (Poland) Waldemar Sobota (Śląsk Wrocław)
- (Paraguay) Óscar Cardozo (Benfica)
- (Brazil) Luisão (Benfica)
- (Argentina) Nicolás Gaitán (Benfica)
- (Spain) Markel Susaeta (Athletic Bilbao)
- (Denmark) Mathias Jørgensen (PSV Eindhoven)
- (Netherlands) Jeremain Lens (PSV Eindhoven)

The topscorer of the 2012 Polish Masters was Carlos Martins, because he played fewer minutes than Georginio Wijnaldum.
