= Amido Baldé =

Bissau-Guinean footballer (born 1991)

Personal information
- Full name: Amido Baldé
- Date of birth: 16 May 1991 (age 35)
- Place of birth: Bissau, Guinea-Bissau
- Height: 1.93 m (6 ft 4 in)
- Position: Forward

Youth career
- Sporting Bissau
- 2008–2010: Sporting CP

Senior career*
Years	Team	Apps	(Gls)
2010–2012	Sporting CP	0	(0)
2010	→ Santa Clara (loan)	5	(0)
2011	→ Badajoz (loan)	13	(4)
2011–2012	→ Cercle Brugge (loan)	22	(6)
2012–2013	Vitória Guimarães	27	(9)
2013–2015	Celtic	20	(3)
2014–2015	→ Waasland-Beveren (loan)	14	(1)
2015	→ Hapoel Tel Aviv (loan)	9	(0)
2015–2016	Metz	8	(0)
2016	Benfica Luanda	12	(5)
2016–2017	Marítimo	2	(0)
2017	→ Tondela (loan)	2	(0)
2018	Kukësi	8	(2)
2018–2019	Al-Nasr	5	(0)
2019	Persebaya	9	(5)
2019	PSM	14	(6)
2020	Ho Chi Minh City	9	(3)
Total		179	(44)

International career
2009–2010	Portugal U19	16	(2)
2011	Portugal U20	10	(2)
2015	Guinea-Bissau	4	(1)
Medal record
Men's football
Representing Portugal
FIFA U-20 World Cup
Runner-up	2011 Colombia
- * Club domestic league appearances and goals

Amido Baldé CvIH (born 16 May 1991) is a former professional footballer who played as a forward.

He started his career with Sporting CP, being loaned several times over the duration of his contract and winning the 2013 Taça de Portugal with Vitória de Guimarães. In 2013 he signed with Celtic, who also loaned him twice before he left for Metz two years later. After playing for Benfica Luanda in Angola, he returned to Portugal in the summer of 2016, when he joined Marítimo. In subsequent years he had a nomadic career, having brief spells at clubs in Albania, Libya, Indonesia and Vietnam.

Internationally, Baldé represented Portugal at youth level, helping the under-20 team finish second at the 2011 World Cup. In 2014, he decided to switch allegiance to the country of his birth, Guinea-Bissau.

== Club career ==
=== Sporting CP ===
Born in Bissau, Baldé started his career with Sporting CP's farm team in Guinea-Bissau, Sporting de Bissau. In 2008 he, alongside teammate Zezinho, moved to the Lisbon club to continue his development, helping it to back-to-back junior championships – of three in total in a row – scoring 13 goals in 29 games in 2008–09.

Baldé split the 2010–11 season, his first as a senior, between Santa Clara (Segunda Liga) and Badajoz (Spanish Segunda División B). Still owned by the Lions, he joined several Sporting teammates at Cercle Brugge in Belgium for the following campaign.

=== Vitória Guimarães ===
Baldé was released by Sporting in summer 2012. On 28 August he signed with fellow Primeira Liga side Vitória de Guimarães for two years. He made his debut on 21 September, coming on as a late substitute in a 1–0 away win against Moreirense. After a series of appearances from the bench, he scored in only his second game as a starter on 23 November, netting an injury time equaliser in a 2–2 draw at Beira-Mar.

Baldé appeared in 37 matches in all competitions in his only season, including seven in the Taça de Portugal. He helped the Minho club win the tournament for the first time ever – he was replaced in the 90th minute of the final against Benfica, a 2–1 victory.

=== Celtic ===
On 13 June 2013, Baldé signed a four-year contract with Scottish Premier League champions Celtic; on arrival, he stated that his new team were "one of the best clubs in Europe and they are going to play in the Champions League." He made his official debut on 23 July, replacing James Forrest for the last 15 minutes of the second leg of the Champions League qualifier against Cliftonville.

Baldé scored his first competitive goal on 28 September 2013, coming in as a late substitute and netting the last goal in a 5–2 win at Kilmarnock. On 27 October, at Partick Thistle, he took the field in the 67th minute and scored the 2–1 winner eight minutes later. He failed to establish himself as a regular in the team, and although he made 20 league appearances over the season, most were as a substitute; his only other goal came in a 4–0 league victory over Kilmarnock, on 29 January 2014.

On 1 September 2014, Baldé joined Waasland-Beveren in the Belgian Pro League on a season-long loan. He made his debut twelve days later against Zulte Waregem, scoring his team's second goal in an eventual 4–1 away win, a spectacular half-volley from 40 yards out. It was to be his only competitive goal for the club, and in January 2015 he moved on loan again, this time to Hapoel Tel Aviv. He made 11 competitive appearances for the Israelis, failing to score in any of them.

In June 2015, Celtic agreed to terminate Baldé's contract despite there still being two years left to run.

=== Metz ===
On 16 July 2015, Baldé signed a two-year deal with Metz of the French Ligue 2. He made his debut on 1 August, in a 0–0 draw against Lens.

Baldé failed to find the net during his spell at the Stade Saint-Symphorien, in nine official games.

=== Benfica Luanda ===
After terminating his contract with Metz, Baldé moved teams and countries again on 14 January 2016 as he joined Benfica de Luanda in Angola for one and a half years. In his only season he scored a squad-best six goals to help them to a sixth-place finish in the Girabola, and left at the end of August 2016.

=== Marítimo ===
In August 2016, Baldé returned to European football and Portugal when he signed for Marítimo. On 26 March 2017, whilst on loan to fellow top division side Tondela, he was admitted to hospital due to a pulmonary embolism. Marítimo stopped paying his wages, claiming they did not have to pay him as he was unable to play, and he had to rely on assistance from the players' union to support himself and his family; by the end of the year, he was still not at full health.

Baldé travelled to South Africa in January 2018 for a trial with ABSA Premiership club Free State Stars, although doubts remained about his fitness.

=== Kukësi ===
On 1 February 2018, Baldé signed a six-month contract with Albanian Superliga side Kukësi. He made his debut 13 days later, coming on as a second-half substitute during a 1–0 defeat of KF Tirana in the quarter-finals of the Albanian Cup, his first competitive game of football in 11 months. His first league appearance took place on 19 February against Partizani when he took the field in injury time of a 3–1 win, Kukësi's first-ever at the opposition's ground.

=== Later career ===
Following a short spell in Libya with Al-Nasr, in February 2019 Baldé moved to Indonesia after agreeing to a deal at Persebaya. He scored five times in nine Liga 1 matches in the first half of the season, including a hat-trick in a 4–0 victory over Persib on 5 July 2019. He also finished joint-top scorer in the country's cup tournament, the Piala Indonesia, with ten goals along with PSM's Zulham Zamrun; however, the return of David da Silva to the team during the mid-season transfer window saw Baldé become surplus to requirements and on 31 August he signed for another Indonesian club, precisely PSM, scoring on his debut the following day to help the hosts beat Persela 2–1.

In January 2020, Baldé moved to Vietnam to sign for Ho Chi Minh City. He made his debut on 21 January, in a 2–1 loss to Buriram United in a preliminary round of the AFC Champions League. That defeat saw his team drop into the AFC Cup, where the player scored three times in the group-stages; the opening goal in the 2–2 draw with Yangon United, and a brace in a 3–2 win against Hougang United. His first in the V.League 1 arrived on 23 June, in a 3–1 away defeat of Song Lam Nghe An.

Baldé had scored six goals in 14 games in all competitions for Ho Chi Minh City by August 2020. The club then looked to loan him out to other sides in Vietnam, but the player refused. As such, his contract was terminated by mutual agreement.

== International career ==
Baldé chose to represent Portugal internationally. He was part of the under-20 squad that finished as runners-up at the 2011 FIFA World Cup in Colombia, but only saw seven minutes of action.

In May 2014, Baldé switched nationalities to Guinea-Bissau after being called up to the squad for the 2015 Africa Cup of Nations qualifier against the Central African Republic. He earned his first cap on 13 June 2015, playing the full 90 minutes in a 0–0 draw in Zambia in the 2017 Africa Cup of Nations qualifying phase.

Baldé scored his only goal for Guinea-Bissau on 8 October 2015 in a 2018 FIFA World Cup qualifier against Liberia, closing the 1–1 away draw.

== Career statistics ==
=== Club ===
Appearances and goals by club, season and competition
Club	Season	League			Cup		League Cup		Continental		Other		Total	
Club	Season	Division	Apps	Goals	Apps	Goals	Apps	Goals	Apps	Goals	Apps	Goals	Apps	Goals
Santa Clara (loan)	2010–11	Liga de Honra	5	0	1	0	3	0	–		–		9	0
Badajoz (loan)	2010–11	Segunda División B	13	4	0	0	–		–		–		13	4
Cercle Brugge (loan)	2011–12	Belgian Pro League	22	6	1	0	–		–		–		23	6
Vitória Guimarães	2012–13	Primeira Liga	27	9	7	0	3	0	–		–		37	9
Celtic	2013–14	Scottish Premiership	20	3	1	0	0	0	3	0	–		24	3
Waasland-Beveren (loan)	2014–15	Belgian Pro League	14	1	1	0	0	0	–		–		15	1
Hapoel Tel Aviv (loan)	2014–15	Israeli Premier League	9	0	2	0	0	0	0	0	–		11	0
Metz	2015–16	Ligue 2	8	0	0	0	1	0	–		–		9	0
Benfica Luanda	2016	Girabola	12	5	0	0	0	0	–		–		12	5
Marítimo	2016–17	Primeira Liga	2	0	1	0	1	0	–		–		4	0
Tondela (loan)	2016–17	Primeira Liga	2	0	0	0	0	0	–		–		2	0
Kukësi	2017–18	Albanian Superliga	8	2	2	0	0	0	–		–		10	2
Persebaya	2019	Liga 1	9	5	5	10	–		–		3 (Note: Appearances in Indonesia President's Cup)	4	17	19
PSM	2019	Liga 1	14	6	0	0	–		–		0	0	14	6
Ho Chi Minh City	2020	V.League 1	9	3	0	0	–		4	3	1 (Note: Appearances in Vietnamese National Football Super Cup)	0	14	6
Career total			174	44	21	10	8	0	7	3	4	4	214	61

=== International ===
Scores and results list Guinea-Bissau's goal tally first, score column indicates score after each Baldé goal.

List of international goals scored by Amido Baldé
No.	Date	Venue	Opponent	Score	Result	Competition
1	8 October 2015	Antoinette Tubman Stadium, Monrovia, Liberia	Liberia	1–1	1–1	2018 World Cup qualification

== Honours ==
Vitória Guimarães

- Taça de Portugal: 2012–13

Celtic

- Scottish Premiership: 2013–14

Persebaya

- Piala Presiden runner-up: 2019

Portugal U20

- FIFA U-20 World Cup runner-up: 2011

Individual

- Piala Indonesia top scorer: 2018–19 (ten goals)

Orders

- Knight of the Order of Prince Henry
