= Lorenzo Melgarejo =

Paraguayan footballer (born 1990)

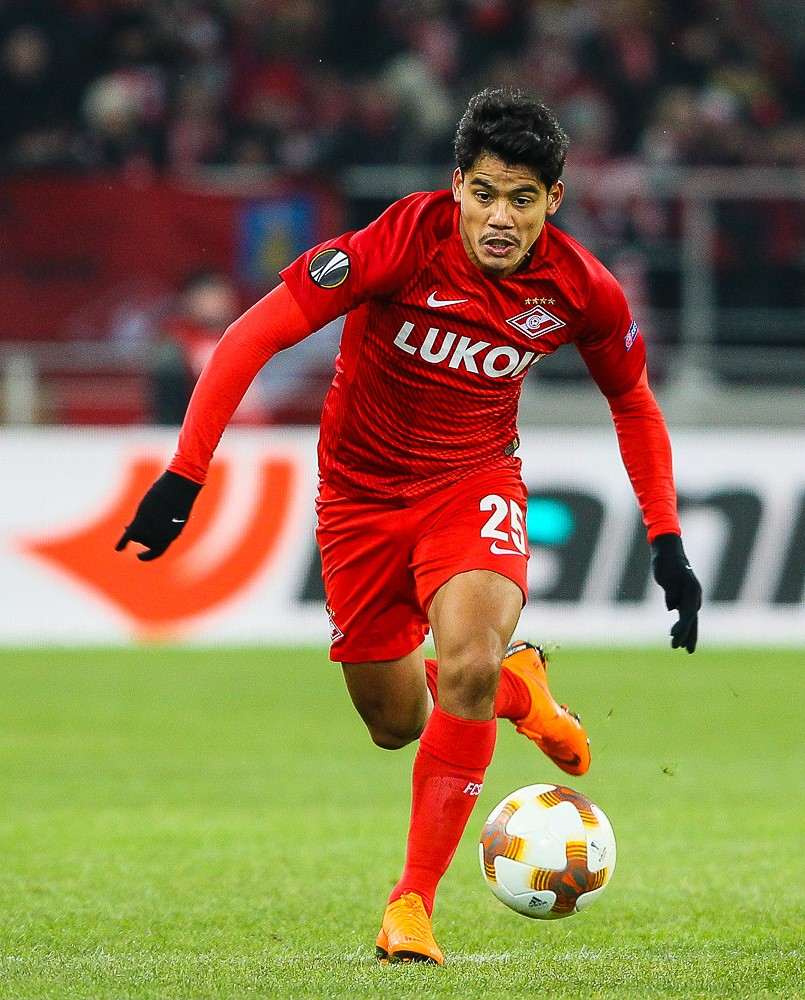
- Melgarejo with Spartak in 2018

Personal information
- Full name: Lorenzo Antonio Melgarejo Sanabria
- Date of birth: 10 August 1990 (age 36)
- Place of birth: Loma Grande, Paraguay
- Height: 1.78 m (5 ft 10 in)
- Positions: Forward; winger

Team information
- Current team: Libertad
- Number: 10

Youth career
- El Porvenir Alteño
- Libertad
- Independiente CG

Senior career*
Years	Team	Apps	(Gls)
2009	12 de Octubre	22	(7)
2010	Olimpia	12	(1)
2011	Independiente CG	17	(8)
2011–2013	Benfica	21	(2)
2011–2012	→ Paços Ferreira (loan)	29	(10)
2013	Benfica B	1	(0)
2013–2016	Kuban Krasnodar	47	(15)
2016–2020	Spartak Moscow	88	(11)
2020–2021	Racing	16	(5)
2021–	Libertad	133	(51)

International career^{‡}
2009–2010	Paraguay U20	3	(0)
2012–2022	Paraguay	5	(0)
- * Club domestic league appearances and goals as of 12 August 2025 ‡ National team caps and goals as of 31 August 2022

Lorenzo Antonio Melgarejo Sanabria (born 10 August 1990) is a Paraguayan footballer who plays as a forward or left winger for Paraguayan club Libertad.

After playing in his country with 12 de Octubre, Olimpia and Independiente, he went on to spend most of his professional career in Portugal and Russia, starting out at Benfica.

Melgarejo won four caps for Paraguay.

== Club career ==
=== Early years / Benfica ===
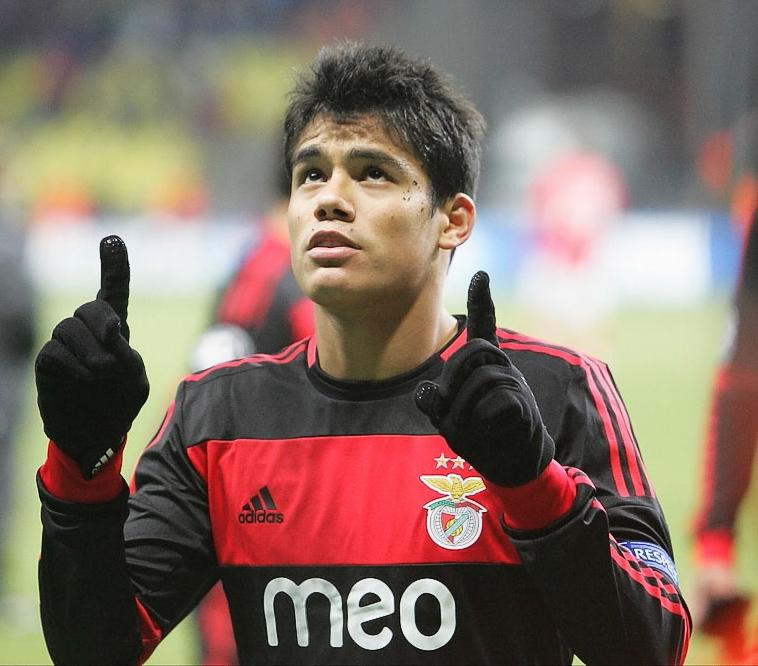
Melgarejo with Benfica in 2012

Melgarejo was born in Loma Grande District. He started his professional career with Club 12 de Octubre at the age of 19, and later moved to the capital, Asunción, where he represented Club Olimpia and Independiente FBC.

In early June 2011, Melgarejo moved to Portugal after being signed by Primeira Liga club S.L. Benfica, who immediately loaned him to fellow league side F.C. Paços de Ferreira for one season.

Melgarejo scored on his debut with Paços, a 2–1 home win against U.D. Leiria. He also found the net against FC Porto in a 1–1 draw on 25 March 2012, also at home, and finished the campaign as the team's top scorer.

For 2012–13, Benfica manager Jorge Jesus decided to recall Melgarejo and reconvert him into a left back, also immediately placing him as a starter. On 17 September, in spite of initial criticism, his contract was extended until June 2018 with a release clause of €30 million.

Melgarejo spent most of the campaign in the starting eleven, including in the UEFA Europa League final, but was an unused substitute in the season's Portuguese Cup final, with Benfica losing both matches.

=== Kuban ===
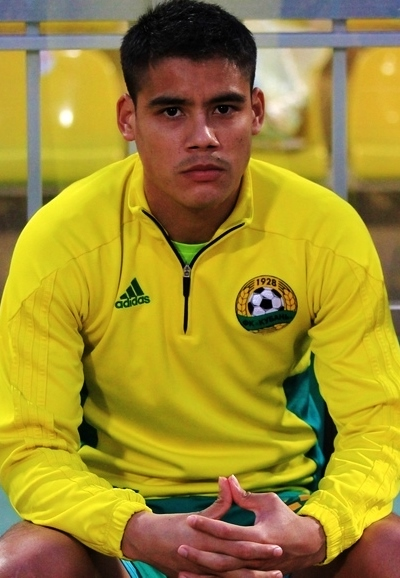
Melgarejo with Kuban in 2015

In July 2013, it was widely reported that Liverpool had agreed a deal to sign Melgarejo on loan, with a view to making the move permanent at the end of the season, but no transfer took place. Instead, on 2 September, he signed with Russian Premier League club FC Kuban Krasnodar for a €5 million fee.

=== Spartak Moscow ===
On 8 February 2016, Melgarejo joined FC Spartak Moscow on a long-term contract.

=== Racing ===
On 25 August 2020, he signed a contract until the end of 2022 with Argentinian club Racing.

== International career ==
On 14 November 2012, Melgarejo made his debut for Paraguay, playing the second half of a 3–1 friendly win over Guatemala. In August 2017, he spoke in an interview of his frustration of not receiving a call up for the national team after six years in Europe.

On 2 March 2019, more than five years after his last selection, Melgarejo was called by manager Eduardo Berizzo ahead of that month's friendlies with Peru and Mexico.

== Career statistics ==
As of match played 26 July 2026

Club	Season	League			National cup (Note: Includes Taça de Portugal, Russian Cup, Copa Argentina, Copa Paraguay)		League cup (Note: Includes Taça da Liga)		Continental		Other		Total	
Club	Season	Division	Apps	Goals	Apps	Goals	Apps	Goals	Apps	Goals	Apps	Goals	Apps	Goals
12 de Octubre	2009	Paraguayan Primera División	21	7	–		–		–		–		21	7
Olimpia	2010	Paraguayan Primera División	12	1	–		–		–		–		12	1
Independiente	2011	Paraguayan Primera División	17	8	–		–		–		–		17	8
Paços de Ferreira	2011–12	Primeira Liga	29	10	1	1	0	0	–		–		30	11
Benfica	2012–13	Primeira Liga	21	2	3	0	2	0	14 (Note: Six appearances in UEFA Champions League, eight appearances in UEFA Europa League)	0	–		40	2
Benfica B	2013–14	LigaPro	1	0	–		–		–		–		1	0
Kuban Krasnodar	2013–14	Russian Premier League	17	6	1	1	–		6 (Note: Appearances in UEFA Europa League)	3	–		24	10
Kuban Krasnodar	2014–15	Russian Premier League	14	1	1	0	–		–		–		15	1
Kuban Krasnodar	2015–16	Russian Premier League	16	8	1	1	–		–		–		17	9
Kuban Krasnodar	Total		47	15	3	2	–		6	3	–		56	20
Spartak Moscow	2015–16	Russian Premier League	11	2	–		–		–		–		11	2
Spartak Moscow	2016–17	Russian Premier League	21	2	0	0	–		1	0	–		22	2
Spartak Moscow	2017–18	Russian Premier League	21	3	2	2	–		8 (Note: Six appearances and one goal in UEFA Champions League, two appearances and one goal in UEFA Europa League)	2	1 (Note: Appearance in the Russian Super Cup)	0	32	7
Spartak Moscow	2018–19	Russian Premier League	23	3	3	0	–		7 (Note: One appearance in UEFA Champions League, six appearances and two goals in UEFA Europa League)	2	–		33	5
Spartak Moscow	2019–20	Russian Premier League	12	1	3	0	–		3	0	–		18	1
Spartak Moscow	Total		88	11	8	2	–		19	4	1	0	116	17
Racing Club	2020	Argentine Primera División	5	4	1	0	–		5 (Note: Appearances in Copa Libertadores)	2	1 (Note: Appearance in Supercopa Argentina)	0	12	6
Racing Club	2021	Argentine Primera División	11	1	–		–		1	0	–		12	1
Racing Club	Total		16	5	1	0	–		6	2	1	0	24	7
Libertad	2021	División de Honor	14	9	3	3	–		4 (Note: Appearances in Copa Sudamericana)	1	–		21	13
Libertad	2022	División de Honor	41	18	2	4	–		8	2	–		51	24
Libertad	2023	División de Honor	29	11	0	0	–		8 (Note: Four appearances and one goal in Copa Libertadores, four appearances and one goal in Copa Sudamericana)	2	–		37	13
Libertad	2024	División de Honor	24	5	0	0	–		9 (Note: Five appearances and one goal in Copa Libertadores, four appearances in Copa Sudamericana)	1	1 (Note: Appearance in Supercopa Paraguay)	0	34	6
Libertad	2025	División de Honor	34	11	1	2	–		6	0	–		41	13
Libertad	2026	División de Honor	19	13	0	0	–		5	4	–		24	17
Libertad	Total		161	67	6	9	–		40	10	1	0	208	86
Career total			413	126	22	14	2	0	85	19	2	0	525	159

== Honours ==
Spartak Moscow

- Russian Premier League: 2016–17
- Russian Super Cup: 2017

Libertad

- División de Honor: 2021 Apertura, 2022 Apertura, 2023 Apertura, 2023 Clausura, 2024 Apertura, 2025 Apertura
- Copa Paraguay: 2023, 2024
- Supercopa Paraguay: 2023, 2024
