= Marçal =

Marçal may refer to:

- Fernando Marçal (born 1989), a Brazilian footballer
- Guilhermina Marçal, a Roman Catholic Canossian sister
- João Marçal (born 1980), a Portuguese futsal player
- Juçara Marçal (born 1962), a Brazilian singer and teacher
- Marçal Aquino (born 1958), a Brazilian novelist, screenwriter and journalist
- Marçal Justen Filho (born 1955), a Brazilian attorney and Law professor
- Maria Mercè Marçal (1952–1998), a Spanish poet, professor, writer and translator
- Nuno Marçal (born 1975), a Portuguese basketball player
- Pablo Marçal (born 1987), a Brazilian businessman
- Pedro Marçal (born 1938), a Portuguese fencer
