= João Ribeiro (footballer) =

Portuguese footballer

Personal information
- Full name: João da Rocha Ribeiro
- Date of birth: 13 August 1987 (age 39)
- Place of birth: Porto, Portugal
- Height: 1.76 m (5 ft 9 in)
- Position: Winger

Youth career
- 1995–2006: Porto

Senior career*
Years	Team	Apps	(Gls)
2005–2006	Porto B	6	(1)
2006–2009	Naval	41	(1)
2009–2010	Frenaros 2000	0	(0)
2009–2010	→ Académica (loan)	22	(1)
2010–2013	Vitória Guimarães	40	(4)
2011–2012	→ Orduspor (loan)	13	(0)
2013	Vitória Guimarães B	3	(0)
2013–2014	Olhanense	12	(0)
Total		137	(7)

International career
2002–2003	Portugal U16	10	(0)
2003	Portugal U17	5	(0)
2006	Portugal U19	4	(0)
2006–2007	Portugal U20	10	(0)
2010	Portugal U23	2	(1)
- * Club domestic league appearances and goals

João da Rocha Ribeiro (born 13 August 1987) is a Portuguese former professional footballer who played as a left winger.

== Club career ==
Born in Porto, Ribeiro was brought up in FC Porto's youth system. He made his senior debut when he was still a junior, but went on to take part in only six times over two seasons with the reserves in the third division.

Released by Porto, Ribeiro signed a four-year contract with Associação Naval 1º de Maio in summer 2006. He made his Primeira Liga debut on 3 December in a 2–0 away loss against C.D. Aves (25 minutes played), and appeared in a further 12 games to help the Figueira da Foz club to retain its status.

Ribeiro became first-choice in the following campaign, featuring in 27 matches and scoring once as Naval finished in 11th position. He missed the vast majority of 2008–09 due to injury.

After one year on loan to fellow top-flight side Académica de Coimbra, from Cypriot Second Division's Frenaros FC 2000, Ribeiro joined Vitória S.C. of the same league. He scored his first competitive goal for the Guimarães-based team on 15 January 2011, in a 1–0 home win over S.C. Olhanense.

For the 2011–12 season, Ribeiro was loaned to Orduspor from the Turkish Süper Lig. Returned to Vitória, he contributed four appearances and one goal in the 2012–13 edition of the Taça de Portugal as the club won the competition for the first time in history, being an unused substitute in the 2–1 final defeat of S.L. Benfica.

Ribeiro agreed to a two-year deal at top-tier Olhanense on 11 August 2013.

== International career ==
Ribeiro earned 29 caps for Portugal at youth level. On 3 March 2010, he scored once for its under-23 team in a 7–2 win over a semi-professional Wales counterpart in the 2009–2011 International Challenge Trophy.

== Honours ==
Vitória Guimarães

- Taça de Portugal: 2012–13
