= João Marçal =

Portuguese futsal player

Personal information
- Full name: João Miguel Fernandes Marçal
- Date of birth: 30 April 1980 (age 46)
- Place of birth: Lisbon, Portugal
- Height: 1.74 m (5 ft 9 in)
- Position: Winger

Team information
- Current team: Burinhosa
- Number: 21

Youth career
- 1994–1995: Brinca N'Areia
- 1995–1999: Atlético Odivelas

Senior career*
Years	Team	Apps	(Gls)
1999–2005	Sporting CP	178	(112)
2005–2006	SL Olivais		
2006–2009	Benfica		
2009–2016	SL Olivais		
2016	AMSAC	8	(5)
2017	Burinhosa	12	(2)
2017–2018	Leões Porto Salvo	21	(6)
2018–2019	Burinhosa	22	(2)
2019–	Jardim da Amoreira		

International career^{‡}
2000	Portugal U21	2	(0)
2001	Portugal U23	2	(0)
2001–2009	Portugal	34	(8)
- * Club domestic league appearances and goals as of 22:00, 16 February 2021 (UTC) ‡ National team caps and goals as of 22:00, 16 February 2021 (UTC)

João Miguel Fernandes Marçal (born 30 April 1980) is a Portuguese futsal player who is a winger for Jardim da Amoreira and the Portugal national team.
