= Michel (footballer, born 1986) =

Brazilian footballer

Personal information
- Full name: Michel Souza da Silva
- Date of birth: 22 August 1986 (age 40)
- Place of birth: Rio de Janeiro, Brazil
- Height: 1.82 m (6 ft 0 in)
- Position: Striker

Senior career*
Years	Team	Apps	(Gls)
2008–2011	Penafiel	83	(34)
2011–2012	Paços Ferreira	28	(9)
2012–2015	Benfica	0	(0)
2012–2013	→ Braga (loan)	3	(0)
2013–2014	→ Al-Wakrah (loan)	23	(7)
2015	Penafiel	1	(0)
Total		138	(50)
- * Club domestic league appearances and goals

Michel Souza da Silva (born 22 August 1986), known simply as Michel, is a Brazilian former professional footballer who played as a striker.

== Club career ==
Born in Rio de Janeiro, Michel moved to Portugal initially as a futsal player, but he switched to association football shortly after because of his physical strength and powerful shots. He started his career with F.C. Penafiel in the third division, scoring 13 goals in 32 games in his first season, which ended in promotion.

In mid-July 2011, after two more years with the club in the Segunda Liga, Michel signed for F.C. Paços de Ferreira. In his only season, he ranked as team top scorer as they retained their Primeira Liga status, notably netting against Sporting CP (twice) and S.L. Benfica in two defeats.

Michel moved to Benfica on 31 May 2012, alongside Paços teammate Luisinho. On 31 August, however, he joined S.C. Braga of the same league on loan, in a deal that saw Lima go in the opposite direction.

In late January 2013, Braga terminated Michel's loan early and he returned to Benfica. He went on loan again in August, now to Qatar's Al-Wakrah SC.

Michel returned to Portugal on 1 September 2014, and the following 2 February he rejoined Penafiel, who now competed in the top tier.
