= André Gomes =

Portuguese footballer (born 1993)

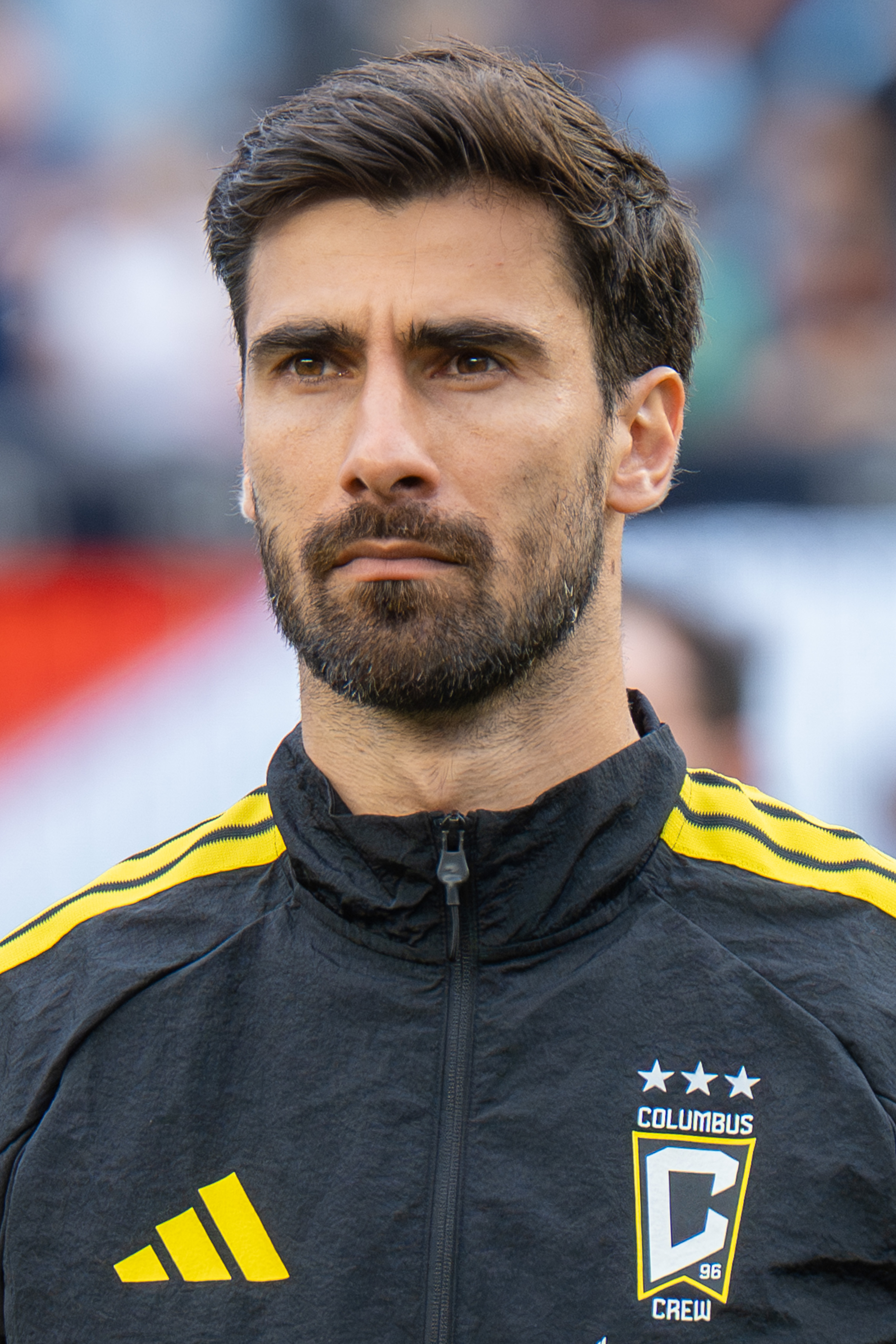
- Gomes with the Columbus Crew in 2026

Personal information
- Full name: André Filipe Tavares Gomes
- Date of birth: 30 July 1993 (age 33)
- Place of birth: Grijó, Portugal
- Height: 1.90 m (6 ft 3 in)
- Position: Central midfielder

Team information
- Current team: Columbus Crew
- Number: 20

Youth career
- 2005–2008: Porto
- 2008–2009: Pasteleira
- 2009–2011: Boavista
- 2011–2012: Benfica

Senior career*
Years	Team	Apps	(Gls)
2012–2014	Benfica B	17	(8)
2012–2015	Benfica	14	(2)
2014–2015	→ Valencia (loan)	33	(4)
2015–2016	Valencia	30	(3)
2016–2019	Barcelona	46	(3)
2018–2019	→ Everton (loan)	27	(1)
2019–2024	Everton	73	(1)
2022–2023	→ Lille (loan)	26	(3)
2024–2026	Lille	22	(0)
2026–	Columbus Crew	24	(1)

International career
2010	Portugal U17	2	(0)
2010–2011	Portugal U18	6	(1)
2011–2012	Portugal U19	9	(3)
2012–2013	Portugal U20	14	(1)
2013–2014	Portugal U21	6	(1)
2014–2018	Portugal	29	(0)
Medal record
Men's football
Representing Portugal
UEFA European Championship
Winner	2016 France
FIFA Confederations Cup
Third place	2017 Russia
- * Club domestic league appearances and goals as of 03:58, 8 November 2026 (UTC)

André Filipe Tavares Gomes ComM (Portuguese pronunciation: [ɐ̃ˈdɾɛ ˈɣomɨʃ]; (Note: In isolation, Gomes is pronounced [ˈɡomɨʃ].) born 30 July 1993) is a Portuguese professional footballer who plays as a central midfielder for Major League Soccer club Columbus Crew.

He played three years at Benfica, where he won the domestic treble in the 2013–14 season. In July 2014 he joined Valencia and, two years later, signed with Barcelona also in the Spanish La Liga. Following a year on loan at Everton, he agreed to a permanent contract in 2019. He then joined Lille on loan for the 2022–23 season, before returning to the Ligue 1 club in 2024 on a two-year deal.

Gomes earned 37 caps for Portugal all youth levels accounted for, including six for the under-21s. He represented the nation at Euro 2016, winning the tournament, and the 2017 Confederations Cup.

== Club career ==
=== Benfica ===
Born in Grijó, Vila Nova de Gaia, Porto District, Gomes joined Benfica's youth system at age 18, playing his last year as a junior with the Lisbon club. On 28 July 2012 he appeared in his first game with the first team, a friendly with Gil Vicente, and spent his first season as a senior with the reserve side, competing in the Segunda Liga.

Gomes scored his first goals with Benfica B in league matches against Braga B (2–2 home draw) and Belenenses (6–0, also at home). On 18 October 2012, he made his official debut with the main squad, playing 25 minutes after coming on as a substitute for Eduardo Salvio and netting in a 4–0 win at Freamunde in the Taça de Portugal.

Gomes' momentum in the first team continued on 27 October 2012, as he started and scored in a 3–0 away victory over Gil Vicente in his first Primeira Liga appearance. However, he continued to be mainly associated with the B team.

On 31 January 2014, Benfica (and Benfica Stars Fund) sold 100% of Gomes' economic rights to a private company, Meriton Capital Limited, for €15 million, plus 25% of a future transfer fee. He remained at the Estádio da Luz until the end of the campaign.

On 16 April 2014, Gomes played the full 90 minutes in the second leg of the semi-finals of the Portuguese Cup, scoring the final 3–1 after a brilliant individual effort to help his team – who played with one man less for 60 minutes against Porto – win the tie 3–2 on aggregate. He ended the season with 23 games in all competitions, helping his side to win the first treble in their history (league, cup and Taça da Liga).

=== Valencia ===
On 17 July 2014, Gomes agreed to a season-long loan deal with Valencia, joining a host of compatriots including manager Nuno Espírito Santo. The economic rights to both him and Rodrigo were owned by Peter Lim, who had purchased the Spanish club.

Gomes made his La Liga debut on 23 August 2014, starting in a 1–1 away draw against Sevilla. He scored his first goal in the competition on 22 September, netting the second of a 3–0 win at Getafe.

On 12 June 2015, Benfica and Valencia announced that they had reached an agreement on Gomes' federative rights. Subsequently, he signed a contract with the Spaniards until 30 June 2020.

=== Barcelona ===
On 21 July 2016, Barcelona reached an agreement with Valencia for the transfer of Gomes, for a fee of €35 million plus €20 million in add-ons. He made his competitive debut on 17 August, playing the full 90 minutes in a 3–0 home win against Sevilla in the Supercopa de España and being directly involved in two of the goals.

Gomes scored his first goal for the team on 19 March 2017, closing a 4–2 home win against his former club Valencia. He was voted the worst signing of the season by readers of Marca. In the final of the Copa del Rey, however, he replaced injured Javier Mascherano early into the first half of the match against Alavés, playing mostly as a right-back and providing the assist for Neymar who netted the second in an eventual 3–1 triumph.

=== Everton ===
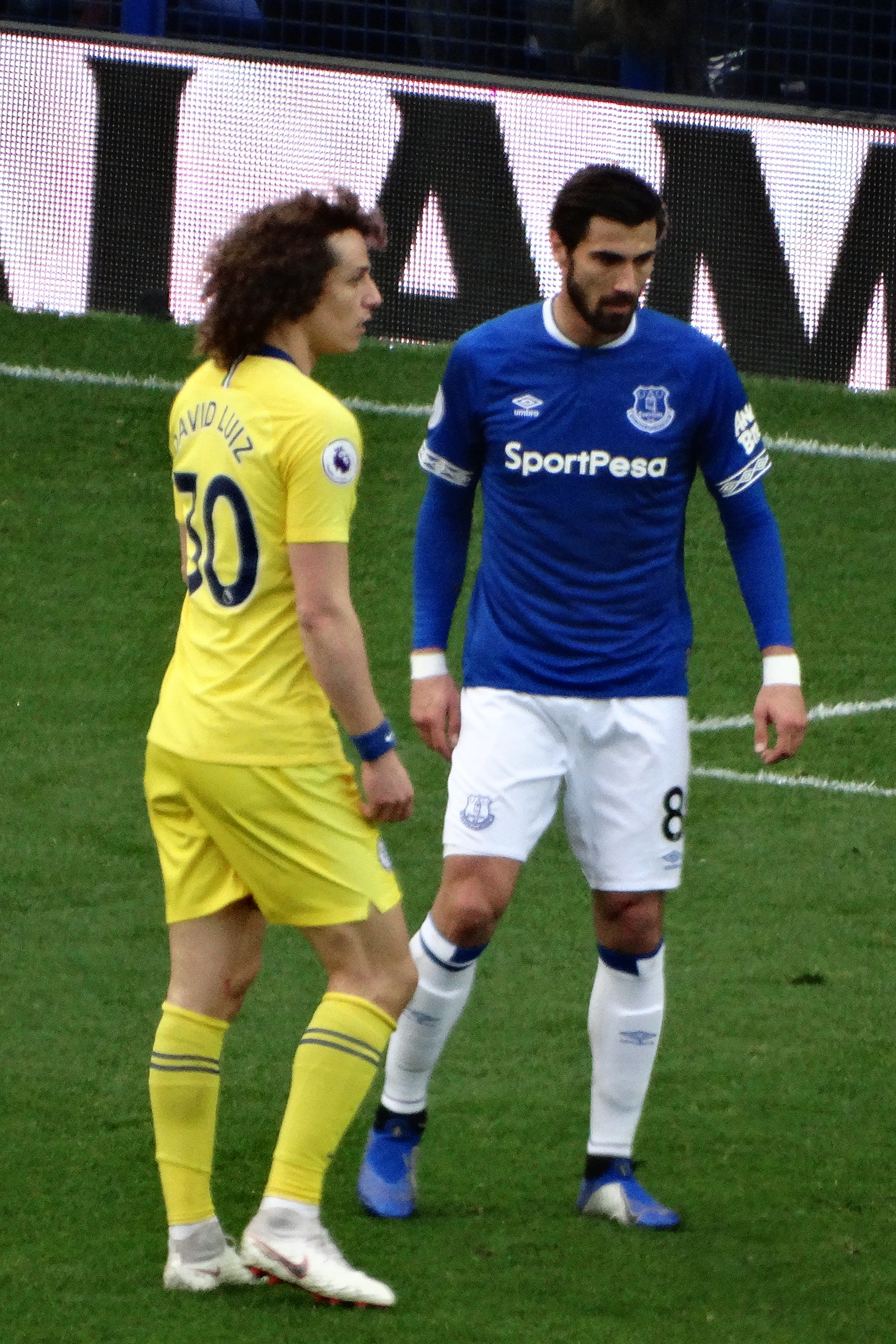
Gomes (right) and Chelsea's David Luiz in 2019

On 9 August 2018, and even though he was nursing a leg injury sustained during pre-season, Gomes moved to English club Everton on a season-long loan for €2.25 million. He made his Premier League debut on 21 October, playing 82 minutes in a 2–0 home win over Crystal Palace. He scored his first goal for the team on 2 February 2019, in a 1–3 home defeat to Wolverhampton Wanderers.

Gomes was a regular for the Toffees during his spell, but on 16 April 2019 he received a three-match ban for standing on the leg of Fulham's Aleksandar Mitrović during the 2–0 loss at Craven Cottage. He signed a permanent five-year contract on 25 June, for a £22 million transfer fee.

On 3 November 2019, Gomes sustained a serious ankle injury in a Premier League home game against Tottenham Hotspur after a tackle by Son Heung-min and subsequent collision with Serge Aurier. Referee Martin Atkinson was going to give Son a yellow card initially, but changed it to red after realising the severity of the situation; the red card was later overturned by The Football Association, while Gomes was expected to make a full recovery after successful surgery.

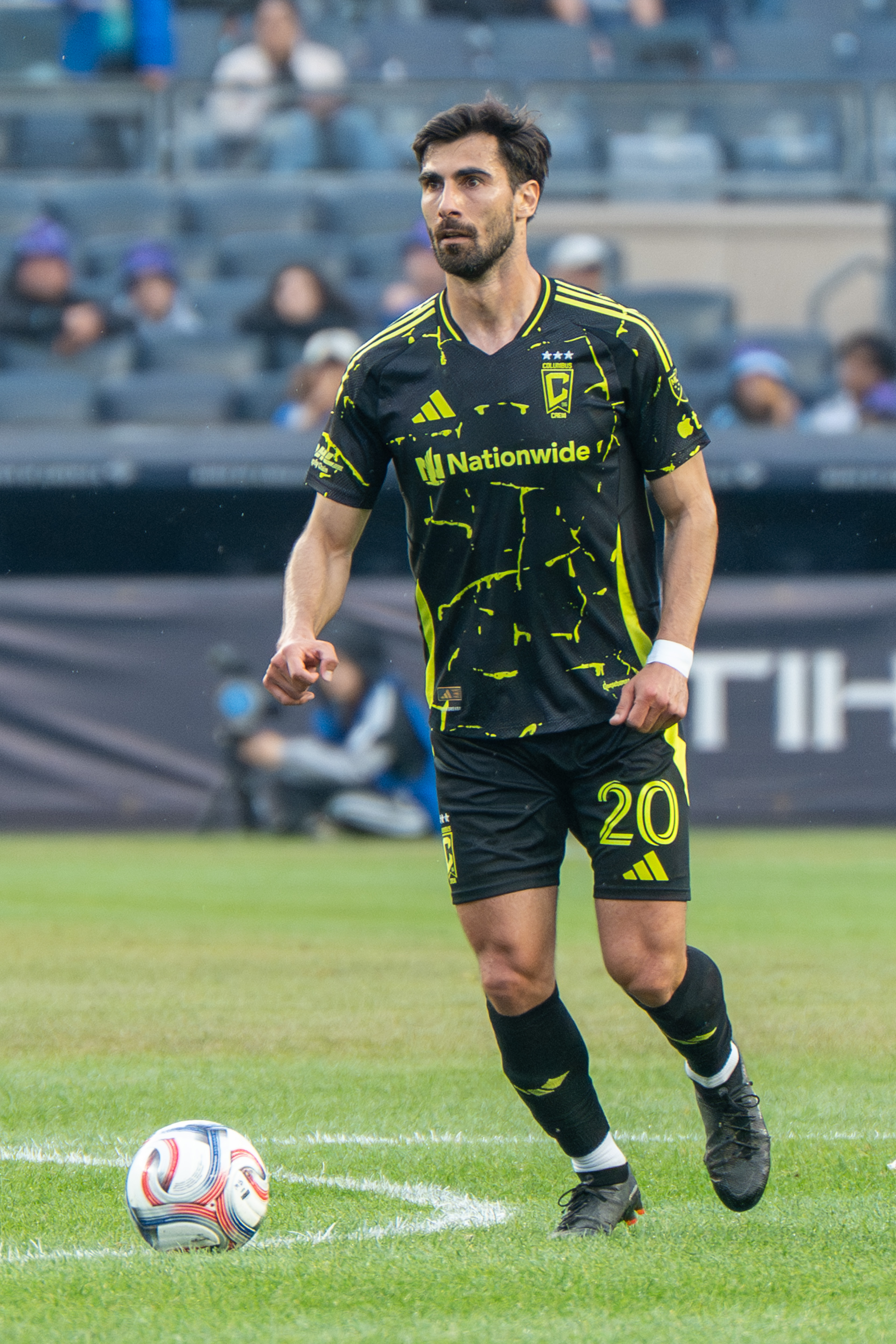
Gomes with the Columbus Crew in 2026

On 23 February 2020, Gomes completed his return from injury in the second half of a 3–2 away loss against Arsenal. In September 2022, he joined French Ligue 1 club Lille on a season-long loan. He scored his first goal for the latter on 4 February 2023 in the 3–1 victory at Rennes; his performance earned him a rate of 8/10 in L'Équipe, the best of the match.

Gomes made his first appearance for Everton in 19 months on 23 December 2023, coming on as a substitute for Idrissa Gana Gueye and scoring his team's goal in the 2–1 league loss at Tottenham. The following 17 January, in the FA Cup's third round replay at home against Crystal Palace, he scored in the 1–0 home win through a free kick to send his side through.

On 17 May 2024, it was announced Gomes would be released on 30 June when his contract expired.

=== Return to Lille ===
On 6 September 2024, Gomes returned to Lille on a free transfer. Over two spells, he made 53 appearances, scored four goals and provided two assists.

=== Columbus Crew ===
On 20 February 2026, Columbus Crew announced the signing of Gomes for free.

== International career ==
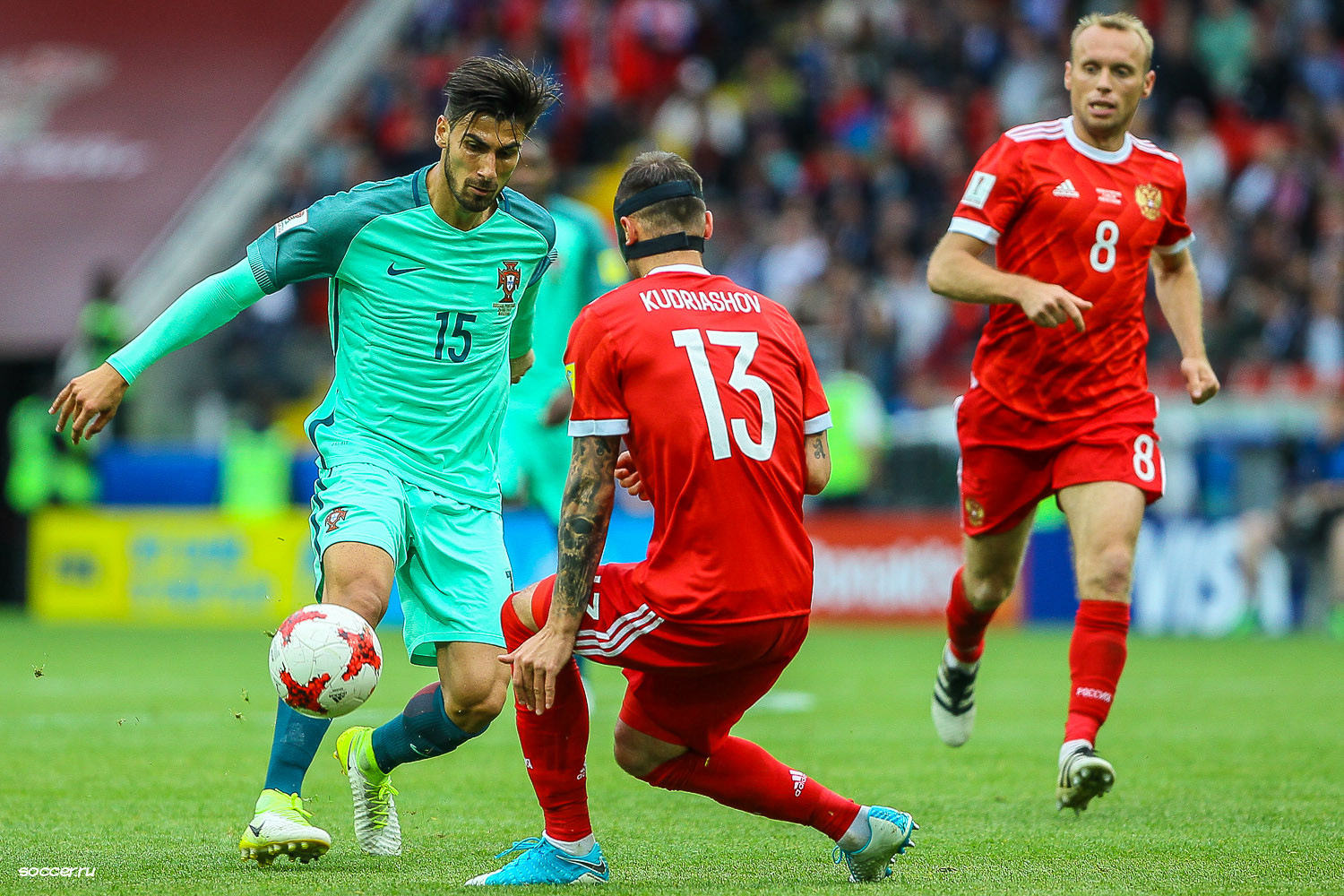
Gomes playing against Russia at the 2017 FIFA Confederations Cup

Gomes represented Portugal at the 2012 UEFA European Under-19 Championship. At the age of 19, he received his first call-up to the senior team, for a friendly against Ecuador on 6 February 2013, but remained unused in the 2–3 home loss.

On 7 September 2014, Gomes made his full debut, starting and playing 90 minutes in a 0–1 defeat to Albania at the Estádio Municipal de Aveiro for the UEFA Euro 2016 qualifiers. He was selected for the squad that appeared in and won the finals in France, starting in their first game, a 1–1 draw with Iceland in Saint-Étienne where he provided the assist to Nani's goal before being replaced by Eder late into the second half.

Gomes also represented Portugal at the 2017 FIFA Confederations Cup in Russia, playing four times as they finished in third place. He was included in a preliminary 35-man squad for the 2018 FIFA World Cup, but did not make the final cut; in total, he earned 29 caps.

== Career statistics ==
=== Club ===
As of match played 21 November 2026

Appearances and goals by club, season and competition
Club	Season	League			National cup (Note: Includes Taça de Portugal, Copa del Rey, FA Cup, Coupe de France, U.S. Open Cup)		League cup (Note: Includes Taça da Liga, EFL Cup)		Continental		Other		Total	
Club	Season	Division	Apps	Goals	Apps	Goals	Apps	Goals	Apps	Goals	Apps	Goals	Apps	Goals
Benfica B	2012–13	Segunda Liga	9	3	—								9	3
Benfica B	2013–14	Segunda Liga	8	5	—								8	5
Benfica B	Total		17	8	—								17	8
Benfica	2012–13	Primeira Liga	7	1	3	0	2	0	5 (Note: Two appearances in UEFA Champions League, three appearances in UEFA Europa League)	0	—		17	1
Benfica	2013–14	Primeira Liga	7	1	4	1	3	0	9 (Note: Two appearances in UEFA Champions League, seven appearances in UEFA Europa League)	0	—		23	2
Benfica	Total		14	2	7	1	5	0	14	0	—		40	3
Valencia (loan)	2014–15	La Liga	33	4	4	0	—						37	4
Valencia	2015–16	La Liga	30	3	4	0	—		7 (Note: Four appearances and one goal in UEFA Champions League, three appearances and one goal in UEFA Europa League)	2	—		41	5
Valencia	Total		63	7	8	0	—		7	2	—		78	9
Barcelona	2016–17	La Liga	30	3	8	0	—		8 (Note: Appearances in UEFA Champions League)	0	1 (Note: Appearances in Supercopa de España)	0	47	3
Barcelona	2017–18	La Liga	16	0	5	0	—		9	0	1	0	31	0
Barcelona	Total		46	3	13	0	—		17	0	2	0	78	3
Everton (loan)	2018–19	Premier League	27	1	2	0	0	0	—				29	1
Everton	2019–20	Premier League	19	0	1	0	0	0	—				20	0
Everton	2020–21	Premier League	28	0	3	0	1	0	—				32	0
Everton	2021–22	Premier League	14	0	3	1	2	0	—				19	1
Everton	2023–24	Premier League	12	1	2	1	0	0	—				14	2
Everton	Total		100	2	11	2	3	0	—				114	4
Lille (loan)	2022–23	Ligue 1	26	3	1	0	—						27	3
Lille	2024–25	Ligue 1	20	0	2	1	—		2	0	—		24	1
Lille	2025–26	Ligue 1	2	0	0	0	—		0	0	—		2	0
Lille	Total		48	3	3	1	—		2	0	—		53	4
Columbus Crew	2026	Major League Soccer	24	1	2	0	—				4 (Note: Three appearances in Leagues Cup, one appearance in MLS Cup playoffs)	0	30	1
Career total			312	25	44	4	8	0	40	2	6	0	410	31

=== International ===
Appearances and goals by national team and year
National team	Year	Apps	Goals
Portugal	2014	3	0
Portugal	2015	1	0
Portugal	2016	13	0
Portugal	2017	10	0
Portugal	2018	2	0
Total		29	0

== Honours ==
Benfica

- Primeira Liga: 2013–14
- Taça de Portugal: 2013–14; runner-up: 2012–13
- Taça da Liga: 2013–14
- UEFA Europa League runner-up: 2012–13, 2013–14

Barcelona

- La Liga: 2017–18
- Copa del Rey: 2016–17, 2017–18
- Supercopa de España: 2016

Columbus Crew

- U.S. Open Cup runner-up: 2026

Portugal

- UEFA European Championship: 2016
- FIFA Confederations Cup third place: 2017

Individual

- UEFA European Under-19 Championship Team of the Tournament: 2012
- UEFA Europa League Squad of the Season: 2013–14

Orders

- Commander of the Order of Merit
