= Léo Kanu =

Brazilian footballer

Personal information
- Full name: Leonardo Medeiros da Silva
- Date of birth: 14 January 1988 (age 38)
- Place of birth: Porto Alegre, Brazil
- Height: 1.96 m (6 ft 5 in)
- Position: Centre back

Team information
- Current team: Internacional de Lages

Youth career
- 2001: Vasco da Gama
- 2002–2004: Internacional
- 2005–2006: Pedrabranca

Senior career*
Years	Team	Apps	(Gls)
2006	Ponte Preta		
2007	São José		
2008–2011	Cruzeiro-RS	?	(?)
2009	→ Esporte Clube Taubaté(loan)	?	(?)
2011–2013	Benfica	0	(0)
2011–2012	→ Belenenses (loan)	19	(3)
2012	→ Ponte Preta (loan)	0	(0)
2013	→ Grêmio Osasco (loan)	15	(1)
2014	Náutico	1	(0)
2015	São José-PA	15	(2)
2015	Passo Fundo	11	(1)
2016	Avenida	8	(1)
2016	Aimoré		
2017	Treze	7	(0)
2017	Inter de Lages	10	(0)
- * Club domestic league appearances and goals as of 2 June 2017

Leonardo Medeiros da Silva (born 14 January 1988), known as Léo Kanu, is a Brazilian professional footballer who plays for Internacional de Lages, as a central defender.

== Career ==
After a series of good performances at the Campeonato Gaúcho, he was bought by Benfica for 996 thousand euros.

He was immediately loaned to Belenenses for one season, and he managed to gain his space at the starting eleven, playing the fifth round of the Taça de Portugal against Sporting CP. However, with the arrival of new manager, Marco Paulo, he lost his place. Later in the season, he criticized the club on Twitter and was suspended.

On 24 July 2012, he returned to Brazil, to play at Ponte Preta on loan from Benfica, but couldn't break into the first team so on 17 December 2012, he moved to Grêmio Esportivo Osasco in Campeonato Paulista Série A3. In 2014, he signed with Náutico in permanent basis, but only managed one appearance before being released. In February 2015, he signed with São José-PA in the Campeonato Gaúcho. After eight months with them, he moved to another team in the Campeonato Gáucho, Passo Fundo. Kanu changed teams again in April 2016, when he signed with Avenida. In July 2016, he moved to Aimoré, and in early 2017, to Treze.

Kanu continued on his journeyman career at Internacional de Lages.

== Honours ==
Best central defender from the 2011 Campeonato Gaúcho by Federação Gaúcha de Futebol
