= Lima (footballer, born 1983) =

Brazilian footballer

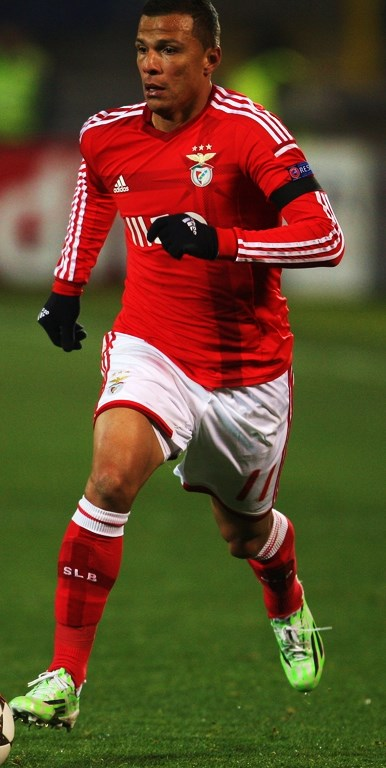
- Lima playing for Benfica in 2014

Personal information
- Full name: Rodrigo José Lima dos Santos
- Date of birth: 11 May 1983 (age 43)
- Place of birth: Monte Alegre, Brazil
- Height: 1.78 m (5 ft 10 in)
- Position: Striker

Youth career
- 2003: Paraná

Senior career*
Years	Team	Apps	(Gls)
2004	Vizela	7	(0)
2004	Mixto		
2005	Paysandu		
2006	Iraty	?	(1)
2006	J. Malucelli		
2006–2009	Astral-PR		
2007	→ Paraná (loan)	17	(1)
2008	→ Juventus-SP (loan)	0	(0)
2008	→ Santos (loan)	21	(0)
2009	→ Avaí (loan)	8	(1)
2009–2010	Belenenses	27	(7)
2010–2012	Braga	60	(26)
2012–2015	Benfica	89	(53)
2015–2017	Al-Ahli	19	(17)
Total		248	(106)
- * Club domestic league appearances and goals

Rodrigo José Lima dos Santos (born 11 May 1983), known as Lima, is a Brazilian former footballer who played as a striker.

He spent the better part of his professional career in Portugal, amassing Primeira Liga totals of 176 matches and 86 goals over six seasons, representing mainly Braga and Benfica and winning six major titles with the latter club, notably the treble in 2014.

== Club career ==
=== Early years ===
Born in Monte Alegre, Pará, Lima played for nine clubs in his country, without settling at any. In the 2008 edition of the Série A he did not manage to score for Santos FC, who ranked in 15th position.

In the middle of 2009, after failing to sign with Ukrainian side FC Metalist Kharkiv, Lima moved to Portugal with C.F. Os Belenenses, scoring regularly for the Lisbon team but also suffering relegation from the Primeira Liga.

=== Braga ===
Afterwards, Lima joined another club in the country, S.C. Braga – which was filled with several of his compatriots – signing a three-year contract. On 24 August 2010, after coming on as a substitute, he netted a hat-trick against Sevilla FC in the second leg of the third qualifying round of the UEFA Champions League, in a 4–3 away win (5–3 on aggregate).

Lima was crowned Portuguese League top scorer at the end of the 2011–12 campaign with 20 league goals – joint with S.L. Benfica's Óscar Cardozo– as the Minho side finished third and returned to the Champions League. Highlights included three against Gil Vicente FC (3–0 away win), braces against F.C. Paços de Ferreira (5–2, home) and Vitória de Setúbal (3–0 at home), and a penalty kick equaliser at Benfica (1–1); he also scored two against eventual champions FC Porto, but in a 2–3 defeat at the Estádio do Dragão.

=== Benfica ===
On 31 August 2012, the very last day of the summer transfer window, Lima signed a four-year contract with Benfica, in a deal that saw Michel move in the opposite direction. He wasted no time on making an impact, also taking long time incumbent striker Cardozo's starting place, and found the net in his first two official games, once against Académica de Coimbra in a 2–2 away draw and twice in a 2–1 victory over Paços de Ferreira (also away). He added a third in the Champions League 1–2 group stage loss at FC Spartak Moscow, ending the season with 30 goals as his team's top scorer in the league.

On 26 January 2013, Lima scored his eighth league goal of the campaign, helping to a 2–1 win at former club Braga. On 30 March he netted his first hat-trick in the Portuguese League, helping to a 6–1 home demolition of Rio Ave FC.

Lima took his 2013–14 tally to 20 all competitions comprised on 20 April 2014, scoring both of Benfica's goals as they defeated S.C. Olhanense 2–0 at home and clinched their 33rd national championship. He also found the net the following game, a 2–1 win over Juventus FC in the first leg of the UEFA Europa League semi-finals also at the Estádio da Luz, where he broke the tie in the 84th minute; his 21 goals in the season helped the team win the three main domestic competitions, in a historic treble.

Lima scored his first goal of the 2014–15 campaign against Moreirense F.C. on 21 September 2014, ending a 12-match stretch without goals. On 14 December he netted in a 2–0 win at Porto, and, on 15 February of the following year, he contributed with a brace to help beat Setúbal at home 3–0. He netted another two in a home defeat of F.C. Penafiel on 9 May (4–0), as Benfica again won the league, adding the Portuguese League Cup and the Supercup.

=== Al-Ahli ===
On 24 July 2015, Al-Ahli Club announced the signing of Lima for two seasons, in a transfer fee worth €7 million. In February 2017, the 33-year-old left the club.

On 21 January 2019, Lima announced his retirement due to injury problems.

== Career statistics ==
Club	Season	League			Cup^{1}		League Cup		Continental		Other		Total		Ref.
Club	Season	Division	Apps	Goals	Apps	Goals	Apps	Goals	Apps	Goals	Apps	Goals	Apps	Goals	Ref.
Belenenses	2009–10	Primeira Liga	27	7	3	4	2	1	0	0	–		32	12	
Braga	2010–11	Primeira Liga	28	6	1	0	2	3	19	5	–		50	14	
Braga	2011–12	Primeira Liga	30	20	2	0	3	2	9	4	–		44	26	
Braga	2012–13	Primeira Liga	2	0	0	0	0	0	2	0	–		4	0	
Braga	Total		60	26	3	0	5	5	30	9	0	0	98	40	–
Benfica	2012–13	Primeira Liga	27	20	7	5	3	3	12	2	–		49	30	
Benfica	2013–14	Primeira Liga	28	14	6	2	4	0	13	5	–		51	21	
Benfica	2014–15	Primeira Liga	34	19	1	0	2	0	6	0	1 (Note: Supertaça Cândido de Oliveira)	0	44	19	
Benfica	Total		89	53	14	7	9	3	31	7	1	0	144	70	–
Al-Ahli	2015–16	UAE Pro League	11	11			6	4	6	4			23	19	
Al-Ahli	2016–17	UAE Pro League	8	6			6	3	0	0	1 (Note: UAE Super Cup)	1	15	10	
Al-Ahli	Total		19	17	0	0	12	7	6	4	1	1	38	29	–
Career total			195	103	20	11	28	16	67	20	2	1	312	151	–

== Honours ==
=== Club ===
Paysandu

- Campeonato Paraense: 2005

Avaí

- Campeonato Catarinense: 2009

Braga

- UEFA Europa League runner-up: 2010–11

Benfica

- Primeira Liga: 2013–14, 2014–15
- Taça de Portugal: 2013–14
- Taça da Liga: 2013–14, 2014–15
- Supertaça Cândido de Oliveira: 2014
- UEFA Europa League runner-up: 2012–13, 2013–14

Al-Ahli

- UAE Pro League: 2015–16
- UAE Super Cup: 2016
- UAE League Cup: 2016–17
- AFC Champions League runner-up: 2015

=== Individual ===
- Bola de Prata: 2011–12
- SJPF Player of the Month: February 2012, March 2013, April 2014
