= Luisinho (footballer, born 1985) =

Portuguese footballer

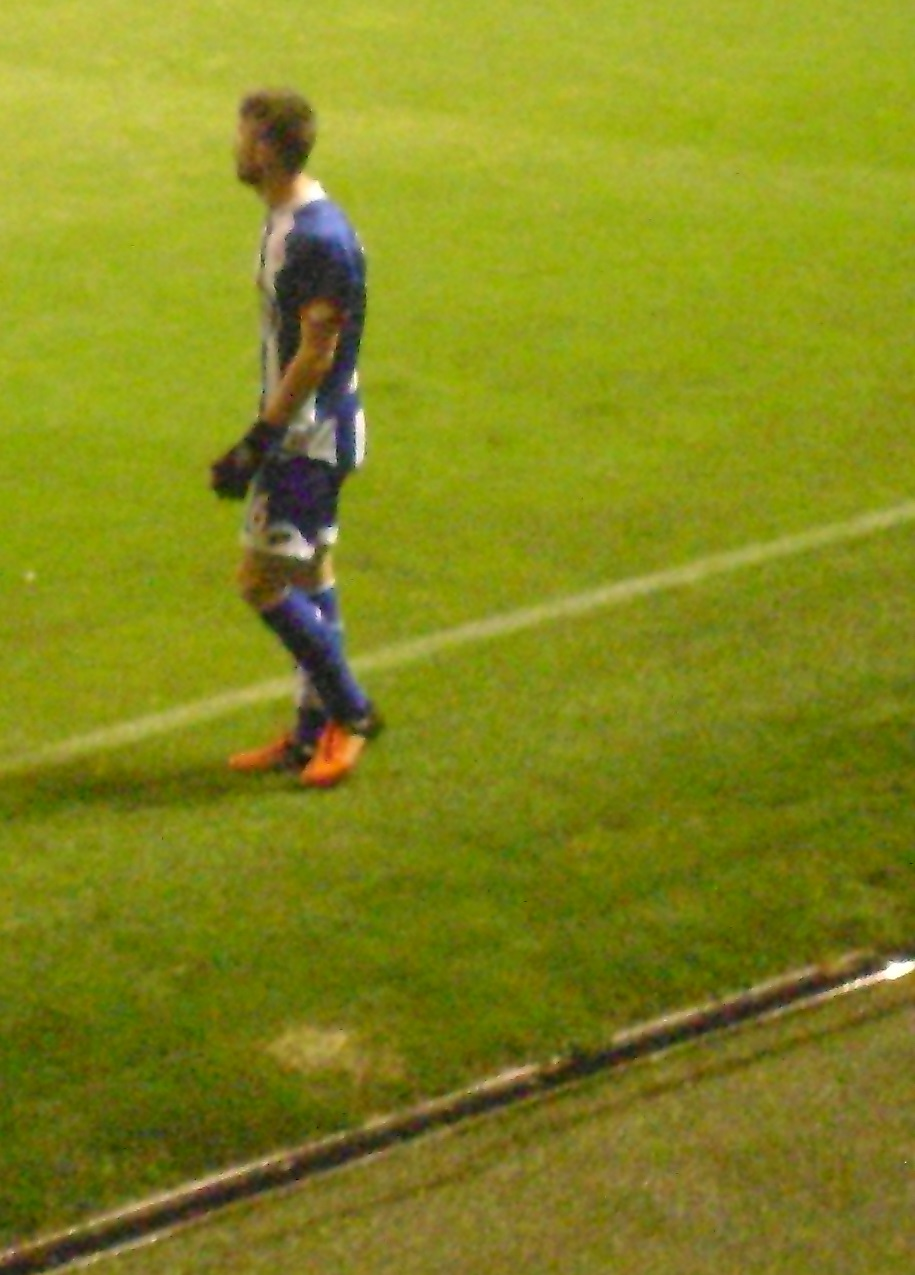
- Luisinho with Deportivo in 2015

Personal information
- Full name: Luís Carlos Correia Pinto
- Date of birth: 5 May 1985 (age 41)
- Place of birth: Porto, Portugal
- Height: 1.71 m (5 ft 7 1/2 in)
- Position: Left-back

Youth career
- 1998–2000: Varzim
- 2000–2001: Espinho
- 2001–2002: Oliveirense
- 2002–2004: Vila Real

Senior career*
Years	Team	Apps	(Gls)
2004–2005	Vila Real		
2005–2007	Braga B	26	(0)
2006–2007	→ Moreirense (loan)	25	(2)
2007	→ Rio Ave (loan)	6	(0)
2008–2009	Moreirense	38	(6)
2009–2011	Aves	51	(5)
2011–2012	Paços Ferreira	28	(1)
2012–2013	Benfica	5	(1)
2013–2018	Deportivo La Coruña	142	(4)
2018–2021	Huesca	39	(0)
2021–2022	Leixões	6	(0)
2022	Vila Real	4	(0)
Total		370	(19)
- * Club domestic league appearances and goals

Luís Carlos Correia Pinto (born 5 May 1985), known as Luisinho, is a Portuguese former professional footballer who played as a left-back.

== Club career ==
=== Early years ===
Born in Porto, Luisinho made his senior debut with S.C. Vila Real in 2004. In the summer of 2005 he joined S.C. Braga, being assigned to the reserves and subsequently serving loans at Moreirense F.C. and Rio Ave FC.

In January 2008, Luisinho joined Moreirense on a permanent basis, moving to C.D. Aves in the Segunda Liga after one and a half seasons. He played his first competitive match for the latter on 2 August of that year, starting and being booked in a 1–1 home draw against G.D. Estoril Praia in the first round of the Taça da Liga.

Luisinho signed with F.C. Paços de Ferreira in June 2011. He appeared in 32 competitive matches in his only campaign at the Estádio da Mata Real, being also reconverted in a left-back in the process.

=== Benfica and Deportivo ===
On 31 May 2012, Luisinho joined S.L. Benfica along with teammate Michel. In August 2013, having been sparingly used, he moved abroad for the first time in his career, signing for Deportivo de La Coruña.

Luisinho slapped teammate Juan Carlos Real in the face on 2 April 2014, following an argument in a training session. He contributed 31 games and three goals during the season, as the club returned to La Liga after a one-year absence.

In 2014–15, Luisinho continued to be a starter under new manager Víctor Fernández, and in early December 2014 renewed his contract until 30 June 2018. However, the following campaign, he was involved in several spats with the latter's successor Víctor Sánchez.

Luisinho scored his only goal in the Spanish top division on 20 September 2017, in a 1–0 home win against Deportivo Alavés. He was first-choice throughout the season, one that ended in relegation.

=== Huesca ===
Lusinho signed a two-year contract with newly-promoted SD Huesca on 15 June 2018. On 9 August 2020, after helping his side return to the top tier at the first attempt, the 35-year-old agreed to a one-year extension.

=== Leixões ===
On 3 July 2021, after Huesca's relegation, Luisinho returned to Portugal after eight years and signed for Leixões S.C. in the second division.

== Honours ==
Huesca

- Segunda División: 2019–20
