= Tomasz Garbowski =

Polish politician (born 1979)

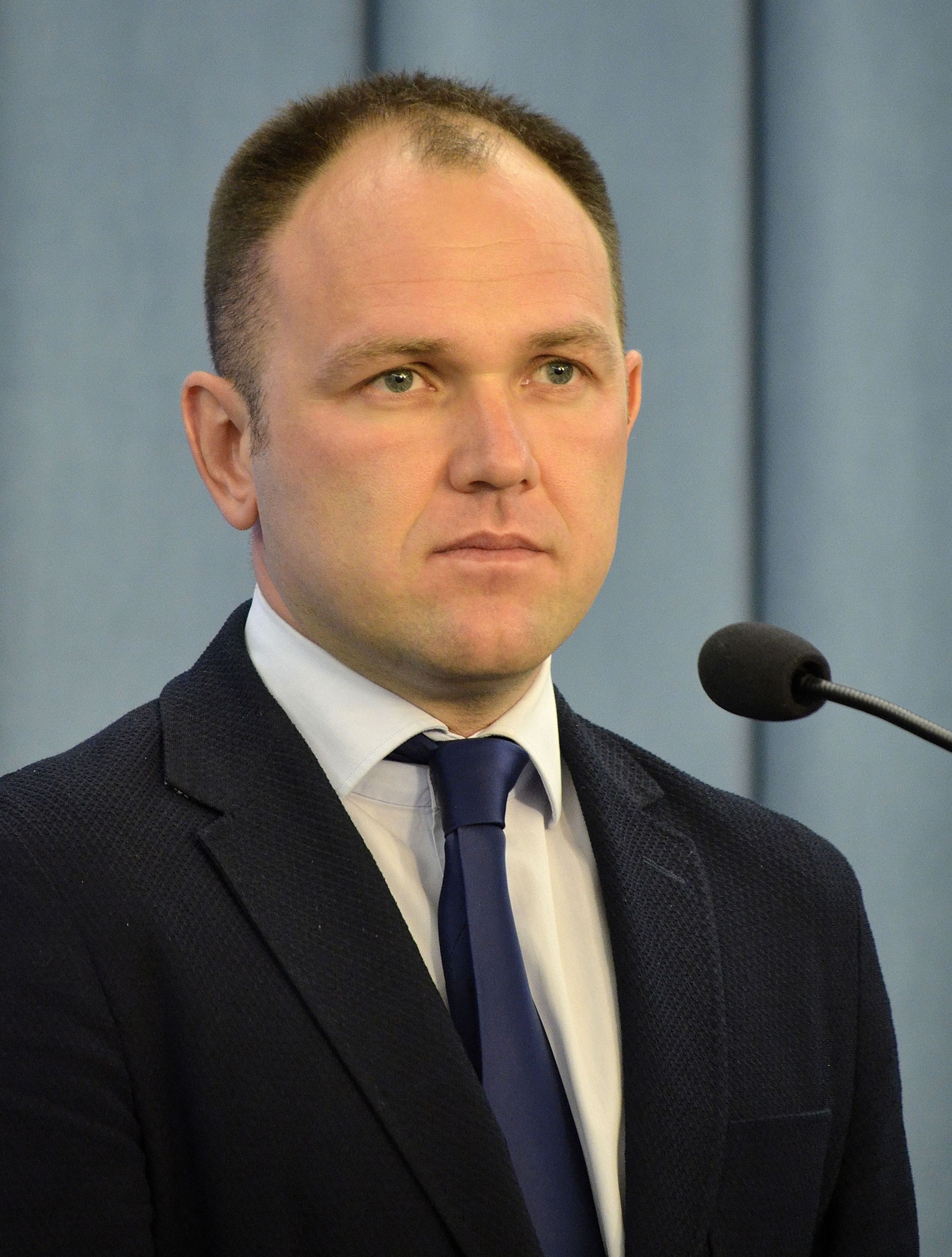

Member of the Sejm
- In office 18 October 2005 – 11 November 2015
- Constituency: 21 – Opole

Personal details
- Born: 1979 (age 46–47)
- Party: Democratic Left Alliance

Tomasz Robert Garbowski (born 7 January 1979 in Kluczbork) is a Polish politician. He was elected to the Sejm on 25 September 2005, getting 7,517 votes in 21 Opole district as a candidate from the Democratic Left Alliance list.

== See also ==
- Members of Polish Sejm 2005-2007
