= Kanú (footballer, born 1992) =

Brazilian footballer

Personal information
- Full name: Alexandre Valério
- Date of birth: 5 March 1992 (age 34)
- Place of birth: Arapongas, Brazil
- Height: 1.80 m (5 ft 11 in)
- Position: Defender

Youth career
- 2010–2011: Braga

Senior career*
Years	Team	Apps	(Gls)
2009–2010	Laranja Mecânica		
2011–2012	Braga	0	(0)
2012–2013	→ Vizela (loan)	17	(0)
2012–2014	Vitória de Guimarães B	19	(0)
2012–2014	Vitória de Guimarães	11	(0)
2015	Apucarana		
2015–2016	Bragança	20	(0)
- * Club domestic league appearances and goals

Alexandre Valério, known as Kanú (born 5 March 1992) is a Brazilian former professional footballer who played as a defender.

== Career ==
Kanú made his Primeira Liga debut for Vitória de Guimarães on 5 January 2013 in a game against Gil Vicente.

== Honours ==
Vitória de Guimarães

- Taça de Portugal: 2012–13
