= 2017 Supertaça Cândido de Oliveira =

- Event: Supertaça Cândido de Oliveira (Portuguese Super Cup)
Benfica	Vitória de Guimarães
3	1
- Date: 5 August 2017
- Venue: Estádio Municipal de Aveiro, Aveiro
- Man of the Match: Pizzi (Benfica)
- Referee: Artur Soares Dias (Porto)
- Attendance: 29,100

The 2017 Supertaça Cândido de Oliveira was the 39th edition of the Supertaça Cândido de Oliveira. It took place on 5 August 2017 and featured the winners of the 2016–17 Primeira Liga and 2016–17 Taça de Portugal, Benfica, and the runners-up of the Taça de Portugal, Vitória de Guimarães. Benfica won their second consecutive Supertaça Cândido de Oliveira for the first time and seventh overall.

== Venue ==
The Aveiro Municipal Stadium was announced as the venue on 6 June 2017, following the decision of the Portuguese Football Federation Directive Board. That same day, the Board announced that the stadium would also be the venue of the following year's Supertaça Cândido de Oliveira. This was the eight time Aveiro Municipal Stadium hosted the Supertaça (it had been the venue in the 2009, 2010, 2011, 2012, 2013, 2014 and 2016 editions).

== Background ==
Benfica made their 19th Supertaça appearance. Their last appearance had been in 2016, when they defeated Braga 3–0 at the Estádio Municipal de Aveiro. Benfica had won six Supertaças, in 1980, 1985, 1989, 2005, 2014 and 2016.

Vitória de Guimarães played in the fixture for the fourth time. Their last presence had been in 2013 when they lost 3–0 to Porto. Vitória de Guimarães had won one edition against Porto in 1988, 2–0 on aggregate, and had also been runners-up in 2011.

== Pre-match ==
=== Entry ===
Benfica qualified for their fourth consecutive Supertaça Cândido de Oliveira by winning the league title. On the penultimate matchday, Benfica won 5–0 against Vitória de Guimarães at the Estádio da Luz to clinch the Primeira Liga for the 36th time and fourth consecutive time for the first time in their history.

Vitória de Guimarães qualified by reaching the cup final, losing to league champions Benfica 2–1.

=== Broadcasting ===
The final was broadcast by RTP.

== Match ==
=== Details ===
5 August 2017
20:45 WEST (UTC+01:00)

Benfica	3–1	Vitória de Guimarães
Jonas 6'; Seferovic 11'; Jiménez 83'		Raphinha 43'

Estádio Municipal de Aveiro, Aveiro
Attendance: 29,100
Referee: Artur Soares Dias

Benfica	Vitória de Guimarães

GK	30	(Portugal) Bruno Varela
RB	34	(Portugal) André Almeida
CB	4	(Brazil) Luisão (c)
CB	33	(Brazil) Jardel
LB	3	(Spain) Álex Grimaldo		(substituted off) 75'
DM	5	(Serbia) Ljubomir Fejsa
CM	21	(Portugal) Pizzi
RW	18	(Argentina) Eduardo Salvio		(substituted off) 65'
ST	10	(Brazil) Jonas		(substituted off) 81'
ST	14	(Switzerland) Haris Seferovic	(yellow card) 58'
LW	22	(Argentina) Franco Cervi
Substitutes:
GK	13	(Portugal) Paulo Lopes
DF	2	(Argentina) Lisandro López
DF	19	(Portugal) Eliseu		(substituted on) 75'
MF	6	(Brazil) Filipe Augusto		(substituted on) 65'
FW	9	(Mexico) Raúl Jiménez		(substituted on) 81'
MF	27	(Portugal) Rafa Silva
FW	84	(Portugal) Diogo Gonçalves
Manager:
(Portugal) Rui Vitória

GK	56	(Portugal) Miguel Silva
RB	20	(Portugal) João Aurélio		(substituted off) 80'
CB	3	(Portugal) Josué Sá (c)	(yellow card) 88'
CB	4	(Portugal) Marcos Valente
LB	23	(Portugal) João Vigário
DM	93	(Colombia) Guillermo Celis
DM	8	(South Africa) Bongani Zungu
RW	22	(Portugal) Hélder Ferreira		(substituted off) 72'
ST	99	(Brazil) Rafael Martins	(yellow card) 90+2'
LW	11	(Brazil) Raphinha
CM	16	(Peru) Paolo Hurtado		(substituted off) 80'
Substitutes:
GK	1	(Brazil) Douglas
DF	17	(Mali) Falaye Sacko
DF	6	(Portugal) Moreno
MF	5	(Brazil) Rafael Miranda
MF	45	(Portugal) Xande Silva		(substituted on) 80'
FW	71	(Portugal) Fábio Sturgeon		(substituted on) 72'
FW	26	(Colombia) Óscar Estupiñán		(substituted on) 80'
Manager:
(Portugal) Pedro Martins

Man of the Match:
(Portugal) Pizzi (Benfica)

Assistant referees:
Rui Tavares
Rui Teixeira
Fourth official:
Manuel Oliveira
Video assistant referees:
Jorge Sousa
Hugo Miguel

Match rules

- 90 minutes.
- 30 minutes of extra time if necessary.
- Penalty shoot-out if scores still level.
- Seven named substitutes, of which up to three may be used.

=== Statistics ===
First half
	Benfica	Vitória de Guimarães
Goals scored	2	1
Total shots		
Shots on target		
Ball possession		
Corner kicks		
Fouls committed		
Offsides		
Yellow cards	0	0
Red cards	0	0

Second half
	Benfica	Vitória de Guimarães
Goals scored	1	0
Total shots		
Shots on target		
Ball possession		
Corner kicks		
Fouls committed		
Offsides		
Yellow cards	1	2
Red cards	0	0

Overall
	Benfica	Vitória de Guimarães
Goals scored	3	1
Total shots	17	8
Shots on target	9	5
Ball possession	47%	53%
Corner kicks	2	2
Fouls committed	27	18
Offsides	2	3
Yellow cards	1	2
Red cards	0	0

== See also ==
- 2017–18 Primeira Liga
- 2017–18 Taça de Portugal
- 2017–18 Taça da Liga
- 2017–18 S.L. Benfica season
- 2017–18 Vitória S.C. season
