= 2017–18 Vitória S.C. season =

Vitória de Setúbal
2017–18 season
- President: Júlio Mendes
- Manager: Pedro Martins
- Stadium: Estádio D. Afonso Henriques
- Primeira Liga: 9th
- Taça de Portugal: Round of 16
- Taça da Liga: Group stage
- Supertaça: Runner-up
- Europa League: Group stage
- Top goalscorer: League: Raphinha (15); All: Raphinha (18)
- Highest home attendance: 25,702; Vitória 1–3 Benfica (5 November 2017)
- Lowest home attendance: 9,040; Vitória 1–1 Konyaspor (7 December 2017)
- Average home league attendance: 17867 (7 home league games)
| Home colours | Away colours |
- All statistics correct as of 18 December 2017.

This article shows Vitória Sport Clube's player statistics and all matches that the club played during the 2017–18 season.

== Players ==
=== Current squad ===
As of 6 July 2017.

Note: Flags indicate national team as defined under FIFA eligibility rules; some limited exceptions apply. Players may hold more than one non-FIFA nationality.

| No. | Pos. | Nation | Player |
|---|---|---|---|
| 1 | GK | BRA | Douglas |
| 2 | DF | BRA | Pedrão |
| 3 | DF | POR | Josué |
| 4 | DF | POR | Marcos Valente |
| 5 | MF | BRA | Rafael Miranda |
| 6 | DF | POR | Moreno |
| 7 | MF | POR | Francisco Ramos |
| 8 | MF | RSA | Bongani Zungu |
| 10 | MF | POR | Tozé |
| 11 | FW | BRA | Raphinha |
| 16 | MF | PER | Paolo Hurtado |
| 17 | DF | MLI | Falaye Sacko |
| 20 | DF | POR | João Aurélio |
| 22 | FW | POR | Hélder Ferreira |

| No. | Pos. | Nation | Player |
|---|---|---|---|
| 23 | DF | POR | João Vigário |
| 26 | FW | COL | Óscar Estupiñán |
| 28 | MF | POR | Rúben Oliveira |
| 31 | MF | RSA | Haashim Domingo |
| 43 | MF | GHA | Joseph Amoah |
| 45 | MF | POR | Xande Silva |
| 53 | DF | CIV | Ghislain Konan |
| 56 | GK | POR | Miguel Silva |
| 71 | FW | POR | Fábio Sturgeon |
| 91 | FW | URU | David Texeira |
| 93 | MF | COL | Guillermo Celis |
| 99 | FW | BRA | Rafael Martins |
| — | FW | COL | Sebastián Rincón |

== Pre-season and friendlies ==
Win Draw Loss

| 8 July 2017 Friendly | Vitória de Guimarães (Portugal) | 6–0 | (Portugal) Santiago de Mascotelos |
| 10:00 WEST (UTC+01:00) |

| 12 July 2017 Friendly | Vitória de Guimarães (Portugal) | 9–2 | (Portugal) Vila Chã |
| 18:00 WEST (UTC+01:00) | Hélder Ferreira (1); Óscar Estupiñán (2); Haashim Domingo (2); Xande Silva (1); Tozé (2); Raphinha (1) |

| 15 July 2017 Friendly | Portimonense (Portugal) | 3–3 (5–7 p) | (Portugal) Vitória de Guimarães | Portimão, Portugal |
| 19:30 WEST (UTC+01:00) | Moreno 57', 70' (o.g.); Pires 77' | | Texeira 32'; Tozé 86'; Estupiñán 90' | Stadium: Estádio Municipal de Portimão |

| 19 July 2017 Friendly | Feirense (Portugal) | 1–3 | (Portugal) Vitória de Guimarães | Santa Maria da Feira, Portugal |
| 19:30 WEST (UTC+01:00) | José Valencia | | Pedro Henrique; Tozé; Sturgeon | Stadium: Estádio Marcolino de Castro |

| 23 July 2017 Presentation | Vitória de Guimarães (Portugal) | 0–2 | (Portugal) Porto | Guimarães, Portugal |
| 20:30 WEST (UTC+01:00) | | | Aboubakar 21'; Soares 26' | Stadium: Estádio D. Afonso Henriques; Referee: Jorge Sousa (Portugal) |

| 26 July 2017 Friendly | Sporting CP (Portugal) | 0–3 | (Portugal) Vitória de Guimarães | Rio Maior, Portugal |
| 20:00 WEST (UTC+01:00) | | | Estupiñán 14', 22'; Raphinha 85' | Stadium: Estádio Municipal de Rio Maior; Referee: Artur Soares Dias (Portugal) |

== Competitions ==
=== Supertaça Cândido de Oliveira ===
| 5 August 2017 | Benfica | 3–1 | Vitória de Guimarães | Aveiro |
| 20:45 WEST | Jonas 7'; Seferovic 10', (yellow card) 58'; Jiménez 83' | | Raphinha 43'; Sá (yellow card) 88'; Martins (yellow card) 90+2' | Stadium: Estádio Municipal de Aveiro; Referee: Artur Soares Dias (Porto) |

=== Primeira Liga ===
On 5 July 2017, Liga Portuguesa de Futebol Profissional announced nine stipulations for the Liga NOS fixture draw that took place on 7 July. Among previous conditions, two new were added, the two teams who will play the Supertaça could not play against Sporting CP (Portuguese team in the play-off round of Champions League) on the first two matchdays.

==== League table ====
| Pos | Team | Pld | W | D | L | GF | GA | GD | Pts |
|---|---|---|---|---|---|---|---|---|---|
| 7 | Marítimo | 34 | 13 | 8 | 13 | 36 | 49 | −13 | 47 (Note: Chaves finished ahead of Marítimo on head-to-head points: Chaves 4–1 Marítimo, Marítimo 1–2 Chaves.) |
| 8 | Boavista | 34 | 13 | 6 | 15 | 35 | 44 | −9 | 45 |
| 9 | Vitória de Guimarães | 34 | 13 | 4 | 17 | 45 | 56 | −11 | 43 |
| 10 | Portimonense | 34 | 10 | 8 | 16 | 52 | 60 | −8 | 38 (Note: Portimonense finished ahead of Tondela on head-to-head points: Portimonense 2–0 Tondela, Tondela 2–2 Portimonense.) |
| 11 | Tondela | 34 | 10 | 8 | 16 | 41 | 50 | −9 | 38 |

Source: Liga Portugal
Rules for classification: 1) Points; 2) Head-to-head points; 3) Head-to-head goal difference; 4) Head-to-head away goals scored; 5) Goal difference; 6) Matches won; 7) Goals scored; 8) Play-off. (Note: only criteria 1, 5, 6 and 7 are applied to establish the classification during the competition.)

==== Results by matchday ====
| Matchday | 1 | 2 | 3 | 4 | 5 | 6 | 7 | 8 | 9 | 10 | 11 | 12 | 13 | 14 | 15 | 16 | 17 | 18 | 19 | 20 | 21 | 22 | 23 | 24 | 25 | 26 | 27 | 28 | 29 | 30 | 31 | 32 | 33 | 34 |
|---|---|---|---|---|---|---|---|---|---|---|---|---|---|---|---|---|---|---|---|---|---|---|---|---|---|---|---|---|---|---|---|---|---|---|
| Ground | H | A | H | A | H | A | H | A | H | A | H | A | H | A | H | A | A | A | H | A | | | | | | | | | | | | | | |
| Result | W | L | L | D | W | L | W | L | D | W | L | W | W | L | L | D | L | L | W | | | | | | | | | | | | | | | |
| Position | 4 | 10 | 11 | 11 | 7 | 9 | 8 | 9 | 10 | 8 | 8 | 7 | 6 | 7 | 7 | 8 | 8 | 8 | 8 | | | | | | | | | | | | | | | |

Updated to match(es) played on 21 January 2018. Source:
A = Away; H = Home; W = Win; D = Draw; L = Loss

==== Matches ====
| 10 August 2017 1 | Vitória de Guimarães | 3–2 | Chaves | Guimarães |
| 21:00 WEST (UTC+01:00) | Zungu 23'; Hurtado 32'; Raphinha 57' | | William 80', 88' | Stadium: Estádio D. Afonso Henriques; Attendance: 19,753; Referee: Luís Godinho |

| 14 August 2017 2 | Estoril | 3–0 | Vitória de Guimarães | Estoril |
| 19:00 WEST (UTC+01:00) | Monteiro 19'; Kléber 63' (pen.), 80' | | | Stadium: Estádio António Coimbra da Mota; Attendance: 2,043; Referee: Carlos Xistra |

| 19 August 2017 3 | Vitória de Guimarães | 0–5 | Sporting CP | Guimarães |
| 18:15 WEST (UTC+01:00) | | | Fernandes 3', 60'; Dost 21', 23'; A. Silva 85' | Stadium: Estádio D. Afonso Henriques; Attendance: 22,936; Referee: Hugo Miguel |

| 26 August 2017 4 | Paços de Ferreira | 0–0 | Vitória de Guimarães | Paços de Ferreira |
| 16:00 WEST (UTC+01:00) | | | | Stadium: Estádio da Mata Real; Attendance: 4,353; Referee: Nuno Almeida |

| 10 September 2017 5 | Vitória de Guimarães | 1–0 | Boavista | Guimarães |
| 18:00 WEST (UTC+01:00) | Rincón 65' | | | Stadium: Estádio D. Afonso Henriques; Attendance: 17,426; Referee: Jorge Sousa |

| 17 September 2017 6 | Braga | 2–1 | Vitória de Guimarães | Braga |
| 20:15 WEST (UTC+01:00) | Teixeira (yellow card) 14'; Paulinho 23'; Kouka 45+1'; Silva (yellow card) 54'; Danilo (yellow card) 90' | Report | Raphinha 37'; Wakaso (yellow card) 39'; Pedrão (yellow card) 48'; García (yellow card) 75' | Stadium: Estádio Municipal de Braga; Attendance: 14,185; Referee: Rui Costa |

| 24 September 2017 7 | Vitória de Guimarães | 2–1 | Marítimo | Guimarães |
| 16:00 WEST (UTC+01:00) | Raphinha 5'; Aurélio (yellow card) 28'; Jubal (red card) 63'; Hurtado (yellow card) 66'; Héldon 75' | Report | Costa 15'; Pinho (yellow card) 29'; Júnior (red card) 63'; Bebeto (yellow card) 74' | Stadium: Estádio D. Afonso Henriques; Attendance: 18,019; Referee: Fábio Veríssimo |

| 1 October 2017 8 | Belenenses | 1–0 | Vitória de Guimarães | Lisbon |
| 21:30 WEST (UTC+01:00) | Tandjigora 26', (yellow card) 61'; Sousa (yellow card) 52'; Tomás (yellow card) 55'; Geraldes (yellow card) 59' | Report | Moreno (yellow card) 52' | Stadium: Estádio do Restelo; Attendance: 1,523; Referee: Vasco Santos |

| 23 October 2017 9 | Vitória de Guimarães | 3–3 | Portimonense | Guimarães |
| 21:00 WEST (UTC+01:00) | Raphinha 41', 88'; Valente (yellow card) 78'; Martins 82' | Report | Nakajima 15'; Fabrício 19'; Sá 30'; Hackman (yellow card) 81'; Ricardo (yellow card) 84' | Stadium: Estádio D. Afonso Henriques; Attendance: 11,712; Referee: Hélder Malheiro |

| 29 October 2017 10 | Desportivo das Aves | 1–3 | Vitória de Guimarães | Aves |
| 20:15 WEST (UTC+01:00) | Agra 17' (pen.); Nildo Petrolina (yellow card) 64' | Report | Raphinha 4'; Héldon 45' (yellow card) 45+1'; Jubal (yellow card) 62'; Martins 70' | Stadium: Estádio do CD Aves; Attendance: 3,303; Referee: Luís Ferreira |

| 5 November 2017 11 | Vitória de Guimarães | 1–3 | Benfica | Guimarães |
| 18:00 WEST (UTC+01:00) | Martins 86' | Report | Jonas 22'; Fejsa (yellow card) 49'; Svilar (yellow card) 57'; Luisão (yellow card) 69'; Samaris 76'; Salvio 79'; Almeida (yellow card) 90+3' | Stadium: Estádio D. Afonso Henriques; Attendance: 25,702; Referee: Artur Soares Dias |

| 27 November 2017 12 | Rio Ave | 0–1 | Vitória de Guimarães | Vila do Conde |
| 21:00 WEST (UTC+01:00) | | Report | Celis (yellow card) 29'; Héldon 39', (yellow card) 50'; Wakaso (yellow card) 62'; Martins (yellow card) 90+2' | Stadium: Estádio dos Arcos; Attendance: 3,587; Referee: Manuel Oliveira |

| 3 December 2017 13 | Vitória de Setúbal | 1–2 | Vitória de Guimarães | Setúbal |
| 20:15 WEST (UTC+01:00) | Semedo (yellow card) 11'; Issoko (yellow card) 24'; Paciência 88' (pen.) | Report | Raphinha 12' (pen.), 61'; Vigário (yellow card) 30'; Douglas (yellow card) 63'; Hurtado (yellow card) 67'; Miranda (yellow card) 86'; Jubal (yellow card) 87' | Stadium: Estádio do Bonfim; Attendance: 1,515; Referee: Vasco Santos |

| 11 December 2017 14 | Vitória de Guimarães | 1–0 | Feirense | Guimarães |
| 19:00 WEST (UTC+01:00) | Aurélio (yellow card) 76'; Jubal (yellow card) 89'; Ferreira 90+5', (yellow card) 90+6' | Report | Babanco (yellow card) 20'; Silva (yellow card) 54'; Gomes (yellow card) 74'; Etebo (yellow card) 90+5' | Stadium: Estádio D. Afonso Henriques; Attendance: 9,519; Referee: João Capela |

| 18 December 2017 15 | Moreirense | 2–1 | Vitória de Guimarães | Moreira de Cónegos |
| 19:00 WEST (UTC+01:00) | Cádiz 16'; Arsénio 33', (yellow card) 54'; Semedo (yellow card) 52'; Aouacheria (yellow card) 63' | Report | Kiko (yellow card) 52' (yellow-red card) 72'; Raphinha (yellow card) 68', (goal) 76' | Stadium: Parque de Jogos Comendador Joaquim de Almeida Freitas; Attendance: 3,096; Referee: Nuno Almeida |

=== Taça de Portugal ===
| 14 October 2017 Last 64 | Vasco Gama | 1–6 | Vitória de Guimarães | Vidigueira |
| 15:00 WEST (UTC+01:00) | Pázinho 30' | Summary | Moreno 5'; Martins 16'; Duarte 27'; Tallo 70'; Texeira 90', 90+2' | Stadium: Municipal da Vidigueira; Referee: Nuno Almeida |

| 19 November 2017 Last 32 | Vitória de Guimarães | 2–1 | Feirense | Guimarães |
| 20:15 WEST (UTC+01:00) | Héldon 4'; Ramos (yellow card) 35'; Raphinha 58'; Pedrão (yellow card) 88'; Douglas (yellow card) 90' | Summary | Alcénat (yellow card) 2' (yellow-red card) 48'; Seco (yellow card) 26'; Machado (yellow card) 65'; Silva | Stadium: Estádio D. Afonso Henriques; Referee: Rui Costa |

| 14 December 2017 Last 16 | Porto | 4–0 | Vitória de Guimarães | Porto |
| 20:15 WEST (UTC+01:00) | Aboubakar 12' (pen.); Ricardo (yellow card) 50'; D. Pereira 58'; André 64', 83' | Summary | Sturgeon (yellow card) 57' | Stadium: Estádio do Dragão; Referee: Carlos Xistra |

=== Group C ===
| Pos | Team | Pld | W | D | L | GF | GA | GD | Pts | Qualification |
|---|---|---|---|---|---|---|---|---|---|---|
| 1 | Oliveirense | 2 | 1 | 1 | 0 | 4 | 1 | +3 | 4 | Advance to knockout phase |
| 2 | Moreirense | 2 | 1 | 1 | 0 | 2 | 1 | +1 | 4 | |
| 3 | Feirense | 2 | 0 | 1 | 1 | 2 | 3 | −1 | 1 | |
| 4 | Vitória de Guimarães | 2 | 0 | 1 | 1 | 2 | 5 | −3 | 1 | |

Updated to match(es) played on 11 November 2017. Source: LPFP
Rules for classification: Tiebreakers

=== UEFA Europa League ===
==== Group stage ====
| Pos | Team | Pld | W | D | L | GF | GA | GD | Pts | Qualification | SAL | MAR | KON | VSC |
|---|---|---|---|---|---|---|---|---|---|---|---|---|---|---|
| 1 | (Austria) Red Bull Salzburg | 6 | 3 | 3 | 0 | 7 | 1 | +6 | 12 | Advance to knockout phase | — | 1–0 | 0–0 | 3–0 |
| 2 | (France) Marseille | 6 | 2 | 2 | 2 | 4 | 4 | 0 | 8 | Advance to knockout phase | 0–0 | — | 1–0 | 2–1 |
| 3 | (Turkey) Konyaspor | 6 | 1 | 3 | 2 | 4 | 6 | −2 | 6 | | 0–2 | 1–1 | — | 2–1 |
| 4 | (Portugal) Vitória de Guimarães | 6 | 1 | 2 | 3 | 5 | 9 | −4 | 5 | | 1–1 | 1–0 | 1–1 | — |

Source: UEFA
Rules for classification: Group stage tiebreakers

| 14 September 2017 1 | Vitória de Guimarães (Portugal) | 1–1 | (Austria) Red Bull Salzburg | Guimarães, Portugal |
| 21:05 CEST (UTC+02:00) | Pedrão 25' | Report | Berisha 45' | Stadium: Estádio D. Afonso Henriques |

| 28 September 2017 2 | Konyaspor (Turkey) | 2–1 | (Portugal) Vitória de Guimarães | Konya, Turkey |
| 19:00 CEST (UTC+02:00) | Araz 24'; Milošević 48'; Eze (yellow card) 61'; Turan (yellow card) 64' | Report | Jubal (yellow card) 61'; Hurtado 74'; Celis (yellow card) 76' | Stadium: Konya Büyükşehir Stadium; Attendance: 21,116; Referee: (North Macedonia) Aleksandar Stavrev |

| 19 October 2017 3 | Marseille (France) | 2–1 | (Portugal) Vitória de Guimarães | Marseille, France |
| 19:00 CEST (UTC+02:00) | Ocampos 28', (yellow card) 82'; Abdennour (yellow card) 63'; Lopez 76' | Report | Martins 17'; Jubal (yellow card) 59'; Miranda (yellow card) 63'; Raphinha (yellow card) 90+4' | Stadium: Stade Vélodrome; Attendance: 13,359; Referee: (Sweden) Stefan Johannesson |

| 2 November 2017 4 | Vitória de Guimarães (Portugal) | 1–0 | (France) Marseille | Guimarães, Portugal |
| 21:05 CET (UTC+01:00) | Hurtado (yellow card) 15', (goal) 80'; Ferreira (yellow card) 90+1'; Ramos (yellow card) 90+2' | Report | Evra (red card) 0'; Amavi (yellow card) 8'; Kamara (yellow card) 55' (yellow-red card) 86' | Stadium: Estádio D. Afonso Henriques; Attendance: 14,181; Referee: (Hungary) Tamás Bognár |

| 23 November 2017 5 | Red Bull Salzburg (Austria) | 3–0 | (Portugal) Vitória de Guimarães | Wals-Siezenheim, Austria |
| 19:00 CET (UTC+01:00) | Dabour 26'; Ulmer 45+1'; Hwang 67'; Haidara (yellow card) 76'; Schlager (yellow card) 77' | Report | | Stadium: Red Bull Arena; Attendance: 6,474; Referee: (Scotland) Andrew Dallas |

| 7 December 2017 6 | Vitória de Guimarães (Portugal) | 1–1 | (Turkey) Konyaspor | Guimarães, Portugal |
| 21:05 CET (UTC+01:00) | Celis (yellow card) 13'; Hurtado (yellow card) 63'; Turan 77' (o.g.); García (yellow card) 87' | Report | Bourabia 15'; Turan (yellow card) 45+2'; Bora (yellow card) 57'; Moke (yellow card) 70'; Skubic (yellow card) 73' | Stadium: Estádio D. Afonso Henriques; Attendance: 9,040; Referee: (Germany) Daniel Siebert |
