= Federal Institute of Rio Grande do Sul =

Academic institution in Brasil

Federal Institute of Education, Science and Technology of Rio Grande do Sul
- Instituto Federal de Educação, Ciência e Tecnologia do Rio Grande do Sul
- Type: Public university
- Established: December 29, 2008
- Rector: Júlio Xandro Heck
- Location: Bento Gonçalves and other 8 cities, Rio Grande do Sul, Brazil
- Campus: Urban
- Website: www.ifrs.edu.br

The Federal Institute of Rio Grande do Sul (Portuguese: Instituto Federal do Rio Grande do Sul, IFRS), or in full: Federal Institute of Education, Science and Technology of Rio Grande do Sul (Portuguese: Instituto Federal de Educação, Ciência e Tecnologia do Rio Grande do Sul) is an institution that offers high and professional educations by having a pluricurricular form. It is an multicampi institution, especialized in offering professional and technological education in different areas of knowledge (biologics/human sciences/exact sciences).

IFRS is a federal institution, public, directly vinculated to the Ministry of Education of Brazil.

== Campuses ==
Bento Gonçalves, Porto Alegre, Feliz, Porto Alegre-Restinga, Sertão, Canoas, Caxias do Sul, Osório, Erechim, Rio Grande and Novo Hamburgo

== See also ==
- Federal University of Rio Grande do Sul
