= Miguel Oliveira (footballer, born 1994) =

Portuguese footballer

Personal information
- Full name: Miguel Aires Fernandes de Oliveira
- Date of birth: 25 May 1994 (age 32)
- Place of birth: Infantas, Portugal
- Height: 1.96 m (6 ft 5 in)
- Position: Goalkeeper

Team information
- Current team: Penafiel
- Number: 1

Youth career
- 2003–2012: Vitória Guimarães

Senior career*
Years	Team	Apps	(Gls)
2012–2020	Vitória Guimarães B	144	(0)
2020	→ Leixões (loan)	0	(0)
2020–2022	Moreirense	2	(0)
2022–2024	AEL Limassol	30	(0)
2024–	Penafiel	15	(0)

International career
2010	Portugal U16	1	(0)
2012	Portugal U18	2	(0)
2012	Portugal U19	1	(0)
- * Club domestic league appearances and goals as of 19:18, 8 November 2026 (UTC)

Miguel Aires Fernandes de Oliveira (born 25 May 1994) is a Portuguese professional footballer who plays as a goalkeeper for Liga Portugal 2 club Penafiel.

== Club career ==
=== Vitória Guimarães ===
Born in the village of Infantas in Guimarães, Oliveira joined Vitória SC's youth system at the age of 9. On 18 August 2012 he made his professional debut in the Segunda Liga with the reserves, coming on as a substitute after Assis was sent off late into the first half of an eventual 1–0 away loss against Sporting CP B.

For the 2017–18 season, Oliveira was promoted to the first team in the Primeira Liga as third choice, behind Brazilian Douglas and fellow youth graduate Miguel Silva. On 31 January 2020, he was loaned to second division club Leixões S.C. until 30 June.

=== Moreirense ===
Oliveira returned to the top tier in September 2020, signing a two-year contract with Moreirense F.C. on a free transfer. He only made his top-flight debut on 14 May 2021, in a 2–1 defeat at S.C. Braga.

For the rest of his spell at the Parque de Jogos Comendador Joaquim de Almeida Freitas, Oliveira continued to be second or third choice.

=== Later career ===
In August 2022, Oliveira joined AEL Limassol of the Cypriot First Division on a two-year deal. He returned to Portugal on 18 July 2024, on a contract of the same duration at second-tier side F.C. Penafiel.
