= Miguel Oliveira (disambiguation) =

Miguel Oliveira (born 1995) is a Portuguese motorcycle racer.

Miguel Oliveira may also refer to:

- Miguel Oliveira (footballer, born 1983), Portuguese football defender
- Miguel Oliveira (footballer, born 1994), Portuguese football goalkeeper
- Miguel Oliveira (footballer, born 1995), Portuguese football forward

== See also ==
- Miguel de Oliveira (1947–2021), former Brazilian boxer
