= 2016–17 Vitória S.C. season =

Vitória de Guimarães
2016–17 season
- President: Júlio Mendes
- Manager: Pedro Martins
- Stadium: Estádio D. Afonso Henriques
- Primeira Liga: 4th
- Taça de Portugal: Final
- Taça da Liga: Group stage
Home colours	Away colours

Vitória Sport Clube, commonly known as Vitória de Guimarães, are a Portuguese professional football club based in Guimarães that competes in the Primeira Liga, the top-flight of football in Portugal. During the 2016-17 campaign they competed in the Primeira Liga, Taca de Portugal and the Taca da Liga.

== Primeira Liga ==
=== Results summary ===
Overall								Home						Away					
Pld	W	D	L	GF	GA	GD	Pts	W	D	L	GF	GA	GD	W	D	L	GF	GA	GD
34	18	8	8	50	39	+11	62	8	5	4	27	20	+7	10	3	4	23	19	+4

Last updated: 20 May 2017.

=== Results by matchday ===
Matchday	1	2	3	4	5	6	7	8	9	10	11	12	13	14	15	16	17	18	19	20	21	22	23	24	25	26	27	28	29	30	31	32	33	34
Ground	H	A	H	A	H	A	H	A	A	H	A	H	A	H	A	H	A	A	H	A	H	A	H	A	H	H	A	H	A	H	A	H	A	H
Result	L	W	W	L	D	W	D	W	W	W	L	D	W	W	W	L	D	W	D	L	L	D	W	D	D	W	W	W	W	W	W	W	L	L
Position	12	8	5	9	10	5	6	5	5	4	5	5	5	5	5	5	5	5	5	5	5	5	4	5	5	5	5	5	4	4	4	4	4	4

Updated to match(es) played on 20 May 2017. Source:
A = Away; H = Home; W = Win; D = Draw; L = Loss

== Taca de Portugal ==
16 October 2016 Last 64	Santa Iria	1 - 2	Vitória de Guimarães	Sacavém
16:00		Report		Stadium: Campo do Sacavenense; Attendance: 3,000

20 November 2016 Last 32	Boavista	1 - 2 (a.e.t.)	Vitória de Guimarães	Porto
20:15	Lucas (yellow card) 49' (yellow-red card); Schembri 56'; Erivelto (yellow card) 79'; Nuno Henrique (yellow card) 83'; Mandiang (yellow card) 100' (red card) 120+2'; Aghayev (yellow card) 110'; Fábio Espinho (yellow card) 116'	Report	Tiquinho Soares 28' (pen.); Rúben Ferreira (yellow card) 31'; Hernâni (yellow card) 39'; Rafael Miranda (yellow card) 70'; Hurtado 118' (yellow card) 119'; Xande Silva (yellow card) 119'; João Miguel (yellow card) 120+2'	Stadium: Estádio do Bessa; Attendance: 10,000; Referee: (Portugal) Jorge Sousa

15 December 2016 Last 16	Vitória de Guimarães	1 - 0	Vilafranquense	Guimarães
19:00	Hurtado 61'; Hernâni (yellow card) 65'; Bruno Gaspar (yellow card) 85'	Report	Charles Monteiro (yellow card) 45'; Marocas (yellow card) 71'; Carlos David (yellow card) 81'	Stadium: Estádio D. Afonso Henriques; Attendance: 3,040; Referee: (Portugal) Luis Godinho

18 January 2017 Quarter Final	Sporting Covilhã	0 - 1	Vitória de Guimarães	Covilhã
19:30	Gilberto (yellow card) 51'	Report	João Aurélio (yellow card) 48'; Zungu (yellow card) 76'; Hernâni 79'	Stadium: Estádio Municipal José Santos Pinto; Attendance: 1,825; Referee: (Portugal) Manuel Oliveira
