= Douglas (footballer, born March 1983) =

Brazilian footballer

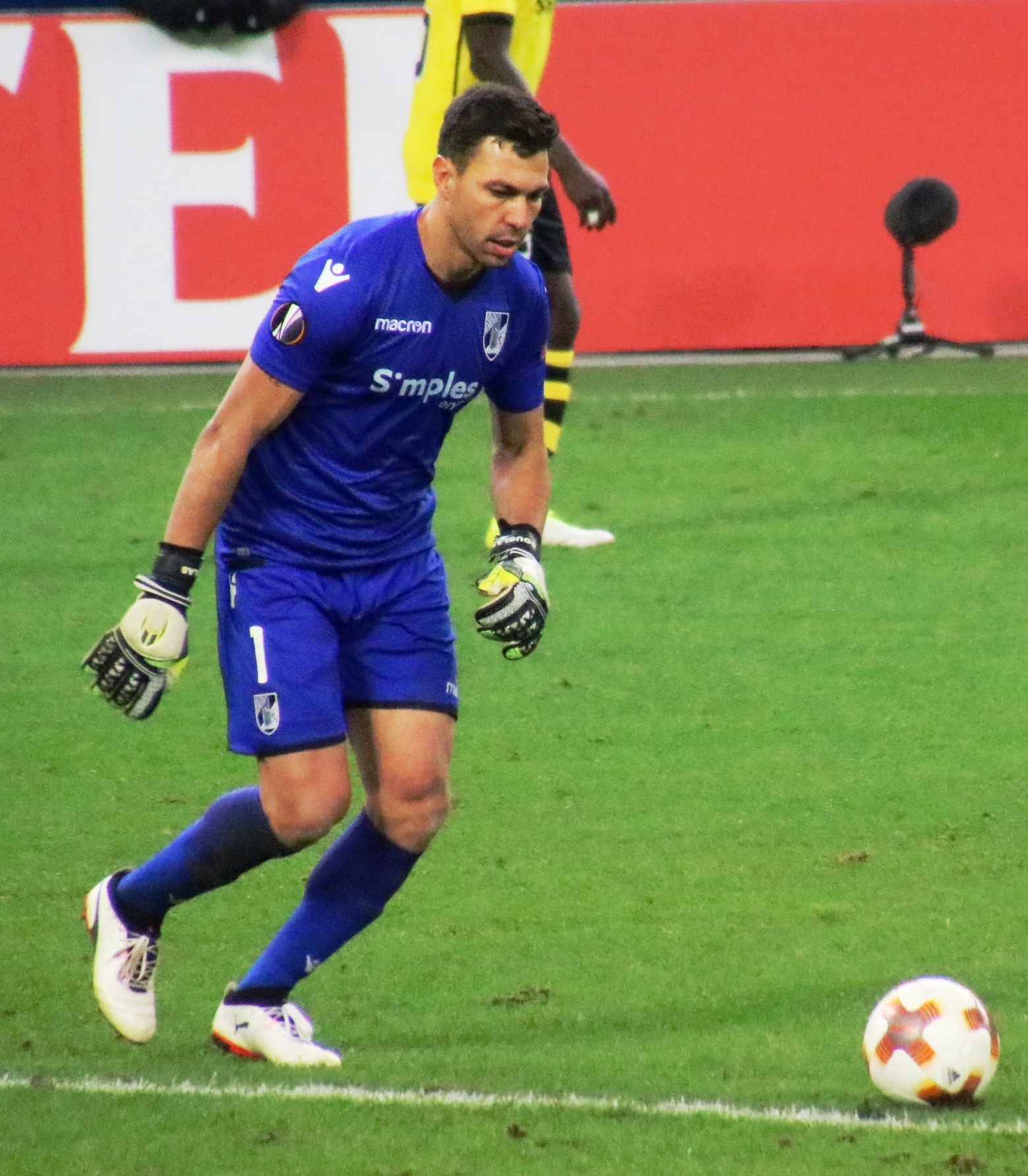
- Douglas playing for Vitória Guimarães in 2017

Personal information
- Full name: Douglas Renato de Jesus
- Date of birth: 9 March 1983 (age 43)
- Place of birth: Ribeirão Preto, Brazil
- Height: 1.88 m (6 ft 2 in)
- Position: Goalkeeper

Youth career
- Botafogo-SP

Senior career*
Years	Team	Apps	(Gls)
2000–2005	Botafogo-SP		
2006	Iraty		
2007	Olímpia-SP	27	(0)
2007	Sertãozinho	6	(0)
2008–2010	Santos	26	(0)
2010	→ Ipatinga (loan)	36	(0)
2011–2020	Vitória Guimarães	190	(0)
Total		285	(0)
- * Club domestic league appearances and goals

Douglas Renato de Jesus (born 9 March 1983), known simply as Douglas, is a Brazilian former professional footballer who played as a goalkeeper.

He spent most of his 20-year career with Vitória de Guimarães, having signed in 2011 from Ipatinga. He won the 2012–13 Taça de Portugal with the club, appearing in 235 competitive matches.

== Club career ==
=== Early career ===
Douglas was born in Ribeirão Preto, São Paulo, and started his career with hometown club Botafogo Futebol Clube (SP). In 2006 he joined Iraty Sport Club, but returned to his native state in the following year after signing for Olímpia Futebol Clube.

After winning the year's Campeonato Paulista Série A3, Douglas moved to neighbouring Sertãozinho Futebol Clube in the Série C.

=== Santos ===
On 6 February 2008, Douglas was presented at Série A side Santos FC after agreeing to a three-year contract. During his first season he started ahead of Fábio Costa and Felipe, playing 17 matches to help his team finish in the 15th position.

Douglas was demoted to third choice in 2009, and was loaned to Ipatinga Futebol Clube of the Série B on 23 January 2010. Upon returning, he left Santos as his contract expired.

=== Vitória Guimarães ===
In January 2011, aged nearly 28, Douglas moved to Portugal and signed with Vitória S.C. from Guimarães. He made his Primeira Liga debut on 5 May 2012 in a 3–1 away win against C.D. Feirense, but spent his first two seasons as backup to compatriot Nilson.

Douglas became the starter from the 2012–13 campaign onwards, occasionally splitting the minutes with Assis Giovanaz first and youth graduate Miguel Silva later. On 26 May 2013, he was on goal as Vitória won their first ever Taça de Portugal after defeating S.L. Benfica 2–1.

On 12 August 2020, after announcing his retirement, Douglas was named academy goalkeeper coach at the Estádio D. Afonso Henriques.

== Career statistics ==
Appearances and goals by club, season and competition
Club	Season	League			State league		National cup		League cup		Continental		Other		Total	
Club	Season	Division	Apps	Goals	Apps	Goals	Apps	Goals	Apps	Goals	Apps	Goals	Apps	Goals	Apps	Goals
Santos	2008	Série A	17	0	1	0	—		—		0	0	—		18	0
Santos	2009	Série A	7	0	1	0	1	0	—		—		—		9	0
Santos	Total		24	0	2	0	1	0	—		0	0	—		27	0
Ipatinga (loan)	2010	Série B	36	0	15	0	—		—		—		—		51	0
Vitória Guimarães	2011–12	Primeira Liga	2	0	—		0	0	3	0	0	0	0	0	5	0
Vitória Guimarães	2012–13	Primeira Liga	29	0	—		6	0	3	0	—		—		38	0
Vitória Guimarães	2013–14	Primeira Liga	29	0	—		1	0	1	0	6	0	1	0	38	0
Vitória Guimarães	2014–15	Primeira Liga	19	0	—		0	0	4	0	—		—		23	0
Vitória Guimarães	2015–16	Primeira Liga	10	0	—		0	0	1	0	2	0	—		13	0
Vitória Guimarães	2016–17	Primeira Liga	30	0	—		0	0	2	0	—		—		32	0
Vitória Guimarães	2017–18	Primeira Liga	19	0	—		1	0	0	0	3	0	0	0	23	0
Vitória Guimarães	2018–19	Primeira Liga	23	0	—		0	0	0	0	—		—		23	0
Vitória Guimarães	2019–20	Primeira Liga	29	0	—		1	0	4	0	4	0	—		38	0
Vitória Guimarães	Total		190	0	—		9	0	18	0	15	0	1	0	233	0
Career total			250	0	17	0	10	0	18	0	15	0	1	0	311	0

== Honours ==
Olímpia

- Campeonato Paulista Série A3: 2007

Vitória Guimarães

- Taça de Portugal: 2012–13
