= Tinga (footballer, born 1978) =

Brazilian footballer

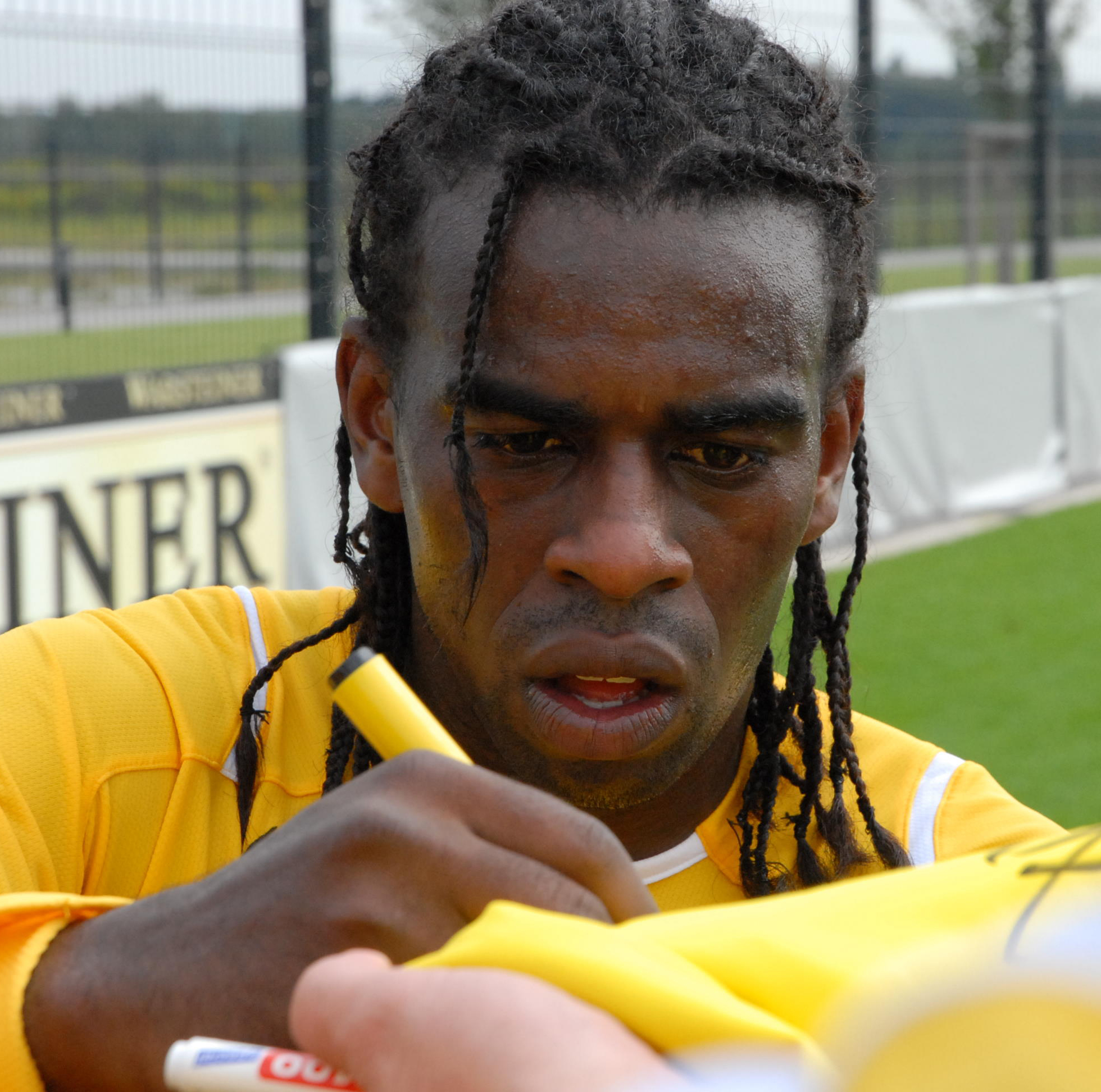
- Tinga as a Borussia Dortmund player (2006)

Personal information
- Full name: Paulo César Fonseca Nascimento
- Date of birth: 13 January 1978 (age 48)
- Place of birth: Porto Alegre, Brazil
- Height: 1.70 m (5 ft 7 in)
- Position: Central midfielder

Youth career
- 1994–1997: Grêmio

Senior career*
Years	Team	Apps	(Gls)
1997–2003	Grêmio	89	(7)
1999	→ Kawasaki Frontale (loan)	24	(8)
2000	→ Botafogo (loan)	17	(1)
2004	Sporting CP	20	(0)
2005–2006	Internacional	42	(6)
2006–2010	Borussia Dortmund	98	(9)
2010–2012	Internacional	43	(3)
2012–2015	Cruzeiro	40	(1)
Total		373	(35)

International career
2001–2007	Brazil	4	(0)
- * Club domestic league appearances and goals

Paulo César Fonseca do Nascimento (born 13 January 1978), known as Tinga, is a Brazilian former professional footballer who played as a central midfielder.

After making a name for himself at Grêmio, he went on to play professionally in, other than his country, Japan, Portugal and Germany, representing Borussia Dortmund in the latter nation.

== Club career ==
Born in Porto Alegre, Tinga started playing professionally with local Grêmio Foot-Ball Porto Alegrense, receiving his nickname from the name of the Restinga quarter where he grew up. In 1999 he was loaned to J2 League club Kawasaki Frontale, moving to Botafogo de Futebol e Regatas in the following year, also on loan.

In January 2004, following a wages dispute, Tinga left Grêmio and signed with Sporting Clube de Portugal, for the rest of that season and two more. However, he would only serve as third-choice in the Portuguese capital side, although he scored in a 2–0 home win against SK Rapid Wien in the club's runner-up run in the UEFA Cup.

Tinga returned to Brazil in December 2004, being sold to Sport Club Internacional and being instrumental in the team's Copa Libertadores success in 2006 as he scored against São Paulo FC in a 4–3 aggregate win. Following these displays, he signed a three-year contract with Borussia Dortmund in Germany for R$8 million. On 26 August he assisted and was booked in his first game, a 3–1 win at VfB Stuttgart, going on to only miss four Bundesliga matches combined in his first two campaigns and adding eight goals.

On 1 April 2010, after not having his contract with Borussia renewed, the 31-year-old Tinga left the club. He re-joined former club Internacional the following month and, on 17 May 2012, moved to Cruzeiro Esporte Clube.

On 30 April 2015, Tinga announced his retirement after his Cruzeiro contract ended.

== International career ==
Tinga made his debut with Brazil in 2001. After a five-year absence he was recalled to the national team by newly appointed manager Dunga, for a friendly against Switzerland, earning his third cap on 15 November 2006.

== Racism issue ==
On 12 February 2014, after a 2–1 loss against Real Garcilaso for the Libertadores Cup, Tinga suffered racist abuse from the home fans, who made monkey noises whenever he touched the ball. He subsequently spoke with sadness of the events, that took place in a "neighbouring country" and "still occurred in 2014".

== Career statistics ==
=== Club ===
Appearances and goals by club, season and competition
Club	Season	League		
Club	Season	Division	Apps	Goals
Grêmio	1996	Série A	0	0
Grêmio	1997	Série A	10	1
Grêmio	1998	Série A	14	0
Grêmio	Total		24	1
Kawasaki Frontale	1999	J2 League	24	8
Botafogo	2000	Série A	17	1
Grêmio	2001	Série A	11	2
Grêmio	2002	Série A	22	2
Grêmio	2003	Série A	32	2
Grêmio	Total		65	6
Sporting	2003–04	Primeira Liga	11	0
Sporting	2004–05	Primeira Liga	9	0
Sporting	Total		20	0
Internacional	2005	Série A	35	5
Internacional	2006	Série A	7	1
Internacional	Total		42	6
Borussia Dortmund	2006–07	Bundesliga	31	4
Borussia Dortmund	2007–08	Bundesliga	33	4
Borussia Dortmund	2008–09	Bundesliga	27	1
Borussia Dortmund	2009–10	Bundesliga	7	0
Borussia Dortmund	Total		98	9
Career total			290	31

=== International ===
Appearances and goals by national team and year
National team	Year	Apps	Goals
Brazil	2001	2	0
Brazil	2002	0	0
Brazil	2003	0	0
Brazil	2004	0	0
Brazil	2005	0	0
Brazil	2006	1	0
Brazil	2007	1	0
Total		4	0

== Honours ==
=== Club ===
Internacional

- Copa Libertadores: 2006, 2010
- Campeonato Gaúcho: 2011, 2012
- Recopa Sudamericana: 2011

Cruzeiro

- Campeonato Brasileiro Série A: 2013, 2014
- Campeonato Mineiro: 2014

=== Individual ===
- Campeonato Brasileiro Série A Team of the Year: 2005
