= Raphinha =

Brazilian footballer (born 1996)

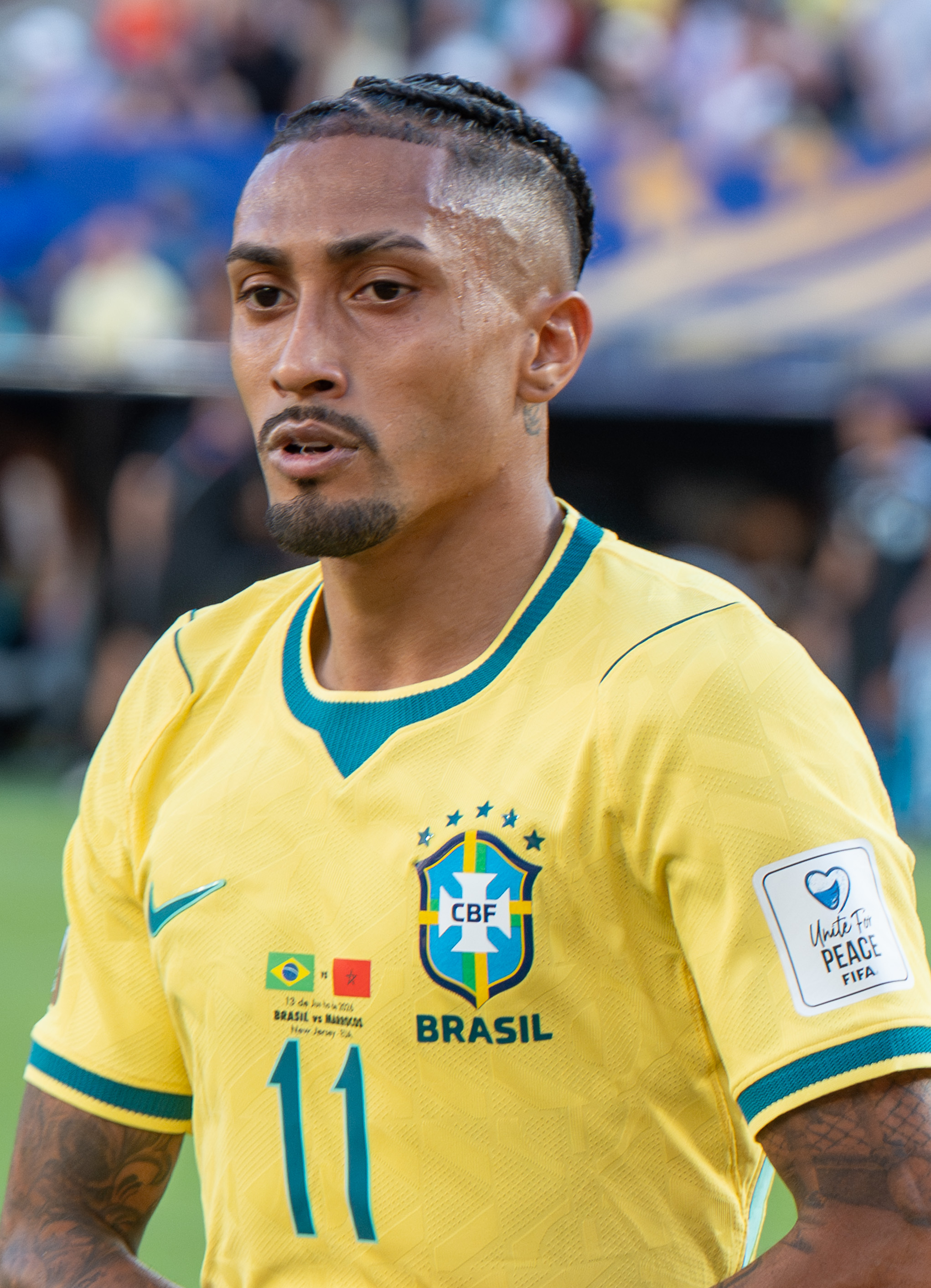
- Raphinha with Brazil in 2026

Personal information
- Full name: Raphael Dias Belloli
- Date of birth: 14 December 1996 (age 29)
- Place of birth: Porto Alegre, Brazil
- Height: 1.76 m (5 ft 9 in)
- Position: Forward

Team information
- Current team: Barcelona
- Number: 11

Youth career
- Porto Alegre
- 2012–2013: Audax
- 2014: Imbituba
- 2014–2016: Avaí

Senior career*
Years	Team	Apps	(Gls)
2016	Vitória Guimarães B	16	(5)
2016–2018	Vitória Guimarães	65	(19)
2018–2019	Sporting CP	28	(6)
2019–2020	Rennes	28	(6)
2020–2022	Leeds United	65	(17)
2022–	Barcelona	134	(59)

International career^{‡}
2021–	Brazil	43	(12)
- * Club domestic league appearances and goals as of 23:00, 22 November 2026 (UTC) ‡ National team caps and goals as of 23:12, 29 September 2026 (UTC)

Raphael Dias Belloli (Portuguese pronunciation: [ʁɐˈfiɲɐ]; born 14 December 1996), known as Raphinha, is a Brazilian professional footballer who plays as a forward for La Liga club Barcelona, which he captains, and the Brazil national team. Considered one of the best players in the world, he is known for his pace, work rate, playmaking ability, and finishing.

Raphinha began his career in Brazil with Avaí, before signing for Portuguese club Vitória de Guimarães in 2016, where he made his professional debut. In 2018, he joined fellow Primeira Liga club Sporting CP, winning the Taça de Portugal and Taça da Liga in 2019.

After having played for Rennes and Leeds United, Raphinha signed for Spanish club Barcelona in 2022. Despite initially struggling, in 2024–25, Raphinha had his breakthrough season, being integral to Barcelona winning a domestic treble of the La Liga title, the Copa del Rey, and the Supercopa de España, while also finishing as the UEFA Champions League top scorer.

After never being capped at youth level, Raphinha made his senior international debut for Brazil in 2021, and was part of their squads for the 2022 and 2026 FIFA World Cups and the 2024 Copa América.

== Early life ==
Raphinha was born in Porto Alegre, Brazil, and grew up in Restinga, a favela far from the city centre. His father is of Italian descent and his mother is mixed-race Brazilian. His father was a jobbing musician who played in a samba band. Raphinha has described a difficult upbringing: he shared a bedroom with his parents, his younger brother and the family's pets, sometimes could not afford the travel to matches, and occasionally had to ask strangers for food.

When he was seven, Raphinha went to Ronaldinho's birthday party, where his father's band was playing; his father and uncles knew Ronaldinho, whom Raphinha now counts as a friend.

As a teenager, Raphinha played in the várzea tournaments around Porto Alegre, which he describes as "a network of independent matches and tournaments organised by the local community". Any player could take part, and the level was well below that of professional clubs' academies. He has recalled playing on clay pitches in intense heat, often with no nets and not enough shirts to go round. Home supporters threatened visiting players in their changing room before matches, and gunshots sometimes went off nearby.

== Club career ==
=== Early career ===
After starting out in a social project, Raphinha went through the football schools of Internacional and Grêmio, but both clubs turned him away for being too small and frail. He later said his trials there each lasted a week and ended with the same excuses. He then played for Porto Alegre, a club run by Ronaldinho's brother Roberto Assis, and returned to várzea football when that club folded. From there he joined the youth ranks of Audax, but the club was sold in 2013, about a year after his arrival.

Disillusioned after leaving Audax, Raphinha accepted an invitation to join the under-20 side of Imbituba in 2014. In around six months with the club, he helped the team finish as runners-up in the second-tier Santa Catarina under-20 championship, and his performances earned him a move to Avaí.

At Avaí, Raphinha played for the under-20 team and was promoted to the first-team squad in October 2015. By his own account, an injury towards the end of that year cost him his place in the under-20 side. Left out of matchday squads and told to train on his own, he came close to quitting before his mother persuaded him to carry on. He nevertheless impressed for the under-20s at the 2015 Copa RS and the 2016 Copa São Paulo de Futebol Júnior. Weeks later, in early 2016, he left Avaí after two years at the club, without having made a senior appearance for the club.

=== Vitória de Guimarães ===
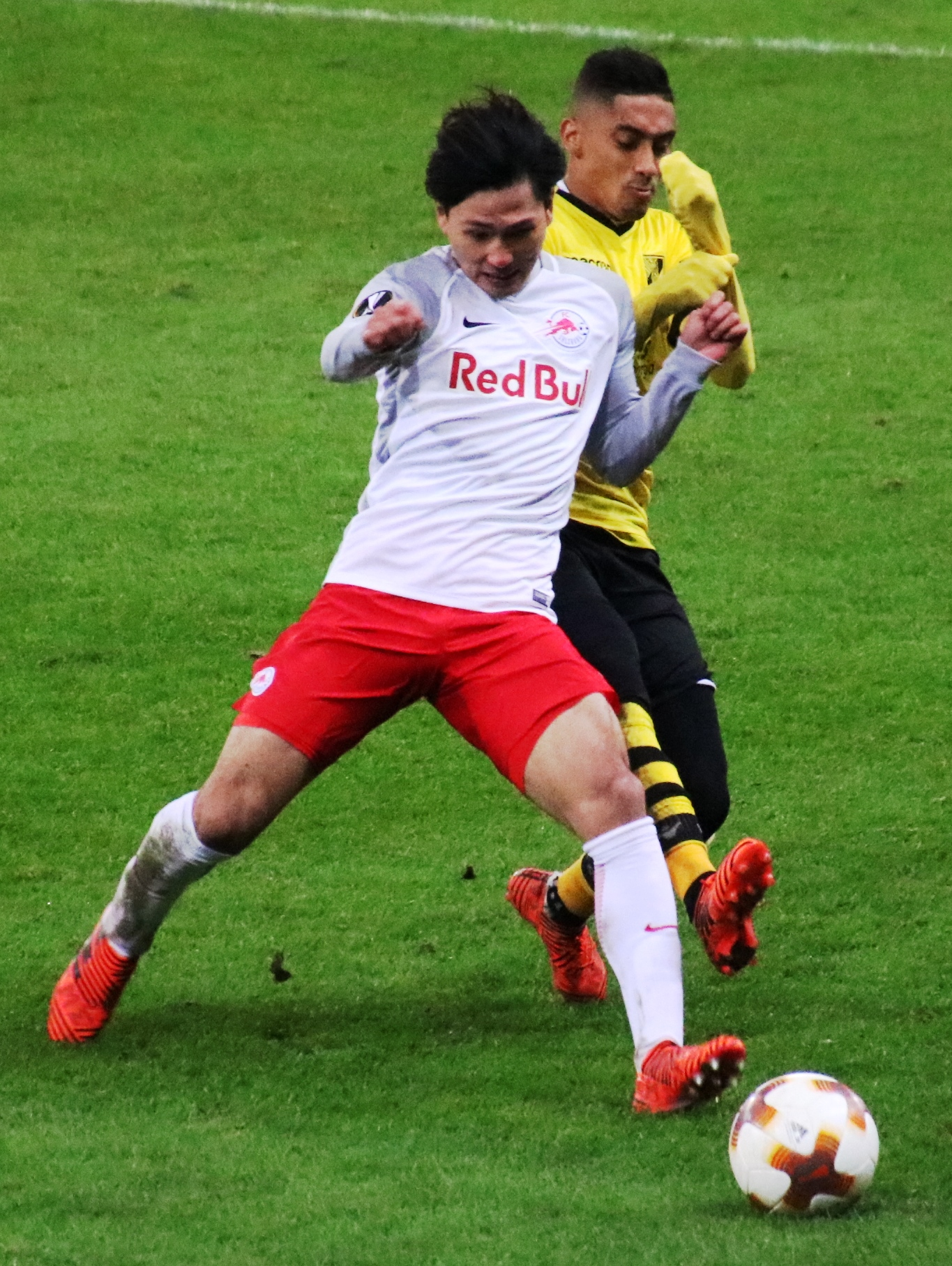
Raphinha (behind) playing for Vitória de Guimarães in 2017

On 2 February 2016, Raphinha signed for Portuguese side Vitória de Guimarães, having been scouted at the Copa São Paulo de Futebol Júnior by Deco, who signed him to his agency, D20 Sports, and arranged his transfer to Vitória. He made his debut for the Vimaranenses on 13 March 2016 against Paços de Ferreira. He scored his first goal for the club against Marítimo on 20 August 2016. He made his first appearance in the 2017–18 UEFA Europa League on 14 September 2017 against Red Bull Salzburg. He won the Vitória Guimarães Breakthrough Player of the Year in 2017. He scored 18 goals during 43 games (in all competitions) during the 2017–18 Primeira Liga season for Vitória de Guimarães.

=== Sporting CP ===
In May 2018, Raphinha transferred to Portuguese club Sporting CP until 2019. He made his debut on 12 August against Moreirense. He scored his first goal for the club on 20 September 2018 against Qarabag in the 2–0 victory in the 2018–19 UEFA Europa League. He struggled in finishing with only four goals and as many assists, in particular due to a muscle injury which hampered his progress, but was a part of the side that won the 2018–19 Taça da Liga and Taça de Portugal, scoring a penalty in the penalty shootout victory against Porto.

=== Rennes ===
Raphinha signed for Ligue 1 club Rennes in 2019, with a transfer fee around €21 million, the club's record signing. He scored and gained an assist in his final game for the club during the 2020–21 Ligue 1 fixture against Reims in a 2–2 draw on 4 October 2020. He scored eight goals and gained seven assists during his time at the club, where he helped Rennes to a third-place finish and qualify for the 2020–21 UEFA Champions League during the 2019–20 Ligue 1 season.

=== Leeds United ===
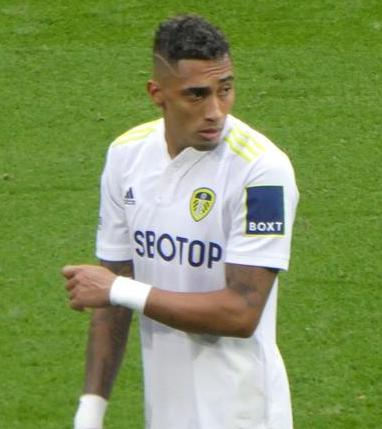
Raphinha with Leeds United in 2021

On 5 October 2020, Raphinha joined Premier League club Leeds United on a four-year contract for an undisclosed fee reported to be in the region of £17 million, or about €20 Million.

On 19 October 2020, Raphinha made his debut as a second-half substitute in a 1–0 loss to Wolverhampton Wanderers. His full debut was at home to Arsenal on 22 November 2020. On 28 November 2020, Raphinha scored his first Leeds goal in a 1–0 away win over Everton. His winning goal secured Leeds' first ever Premier League win at Goodison Park and their first league win at Everton since 1990. He finished the season with six goals, all from league fixtures.

Raphinha scored his first goal of the season on 21 August 2021, in Leeds' first home game, a low-struck 72nd-minute equaliser from just inside the penalty area, in a 2–2 result against Everton, which was nominated as one of the Premier League's Goals of the Month for August.

Raphinha ended the season as Leeds' top goalscorer with 11 goals, including the first goal of the game in the 2–1 away win against Brentford on the last day of the season, from the penalty spot after being fouled by the Brentford goalkeeper David Raya, saving Leeds from relegation to the Championship.

Over the summer transfer window, Chelsea had an agreement in place with Leeds to sign him, with both clubs agreeing a fee worth of £55 million, despite Arsenal and Tottenham Hotspur's interest. However, Raphinha preferred a move to Barcelona, despite their financial struggles. This led to Raphinha flying to Barcelona to complete a deal, being left out of Leeds's squad for their pre-season tour to Australia in order to finalise a transfer.

=== Barcelona ===
On 15 July 2022, Raphinha signed for La Liga club Barcelona on a five-year contract for a reported initial fee of £50m, potentially rising to £55 million in add-ons. He was initially presented without a name or number on his shirt due to registration issues, with the club needing to sell players to register players and make new signings.

==== 2022–24: Adaptation to Spain and La Liga title ====
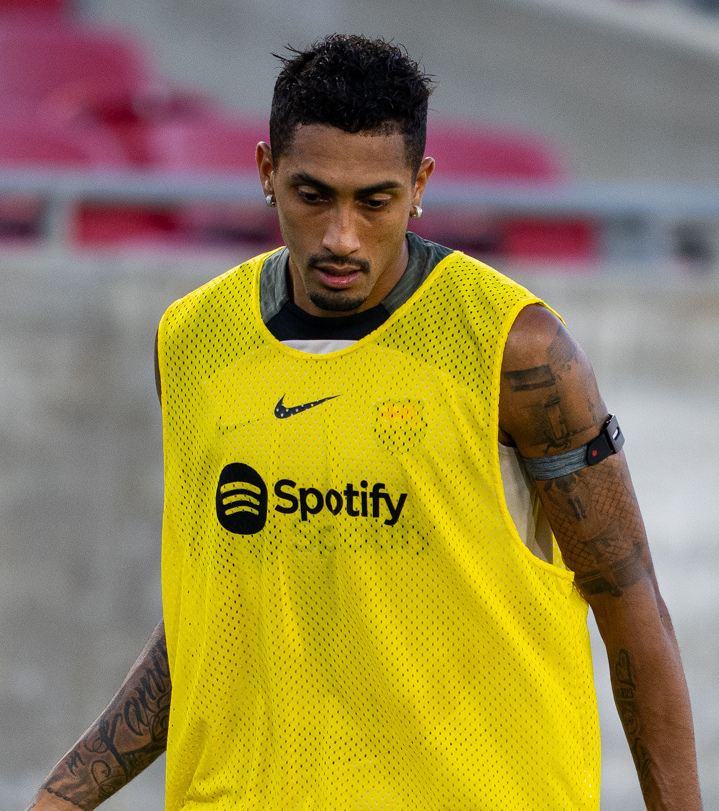
Raphinha training with Barcelona in 2023

On 13 August, Raphinha made his debut for the club in 0–0 draw against Rayo Vallecano in the league. On 3 September, he scored his first goal for Blaugrana in a 3–0 victory over Sevilla at the Ramón Sánchez Pizjuán Stadium. On 13 September, he made his continental debut for the club starting in the 2–0 loss to Bayern Munich in the Champions League. At the end of the group stage, Barcelona finished third, which put them in the Europa League knockout round play-offs for the second consecutive season. Signed to be a replacement for struggling Ousmane Dembélé, both competed for a starting spot with manager Xavi insisting that he wanted to keep both players, hoping to breed competition between them for starting spots on a team that was short on wingers. Over the course of the season, Dembélé's resurgence in form limited his opportunities to impress at his preferred right-wing position.

On 16 January 2023, Barcelona won the 2023 Supercopa de España final, following a 3–1 victory over rivals Real Madrid in El Clásico, winning his first title with the club. On 16 February, Raphinha assisted and scored in a 2–2 draw against Manchester United in a knockout round play-off in the Europa League at the Camp Nou. Barcelona was eliminated from the tournament after losing 2–1 at the away leg at Old Trafford. In the second half of the season, he was handed a chance to impress when Dembélé picked up a muscle injury, but was inconsistent over that period, leading Raphinha to be in and out of the starting XI. On 14 May, he assisted Robert Lewandowski's second goal, as Barcelona defeated Espanyol 4–2 in the Derbi Barceloní, confirming them as La Liga champions.

After missing part of the new season, Raphinha struggled to meet the expectations of fans and Barcelona's management in La Liga, despite support from his manager Xavi. He eventually lost his spot in the starting XI to young prospect Lamine Yamal, who had already scored during Raphinha's absence due to injury and at the end of the first part of the season, he had scored only three goals.

Despite a disappointing overall season, Raphinha played a key role in Barcelona's Champions League campaign, being involved in two goals in their 3–1 win over Napoli on 12 March, in the home leg, knocking them out with a 4–2 aggregate score. On 10 April 2024, he scored his first Champions League goal by netting a brace in a 3–2 away win against Ligue 1 champions Paris Saint-Germain at the Parc des Princes in the quarter-final first leg, and awarded as the Player of the Match. In the return leg at home, despite scoring the opening goal, the Parisian team overturned the aggregate score with a 4–1 win, eliminating Barça.

==== 2024–25: Breakthrough season and goalscoring achievements ====
Despite recording 10 goals and 11 assists in 37 appearances in his previous season, Raphinha's future at the Spanish club was uncertain and with Xavi leaving the managerial role, he was linked with a move away from the club, in order for Barcelona to raise funds amid their financial difficulties. He was the recipient of a contract offer worth €90 million from Saudi Pro League side Al-Hilal, with Barcelona's sporting director Deco informing his agent to look for another team for him. However, Hansi Flick, who replaced Xavi as the new manager, decided to keep him. Raphinha was selected as one of the team's captains for the season after a squad vote.

Flick began his tenure with a different tactical approach than his predecessor, he positioned Raphinha centrally, behind Robert Lewandowski and flanked by wingers, which saw his form improve dramatically. On 31 August 2024, he scored his first hat-trick for Barcelona in a 7–0 thrashing at home against Real Valladolid in a La Liga match. Later that year, on 23 October, he scored a hat-trick in the Champions League in a 4–1 home win against Bayern Munich in the group stage and was named Player of the Match. A few days later, on 26 October, he netted his first goal in El Clásico and provided an assist in a 4–0 away win over Real Madrid. During the match at the Santiago Bernabéu, Raphinha and his Barcelona teammates Lamine Yamal and Ansu Fati were targeted with racial abuse by a group of home supporters.

On 12 January 2025, Raphinha was named Player of the Match, after scoring a brace and providing an assist in a 5–2 victory over Real Madrid in the Supercopa de España final. On 21 January, he was named player of the match once again, after leading Barcelona to a comeback victory against Benfica in the Champions League. He contributed a brace, including a decisive goal in injury time, to secure a 5–4 away win. On 5 March, in the Champions League round of 16, Raphinha scored the only goal of an away win over Benfica, whilst being one man down and scored two goals and provided an assist on 11 March in the second leg of a 3–1 home win, securing a 4–1 aggregate victory and qualify to the quarter-finals of the tournament. On 9 April, he equaled Lionel Messi's record of 19 goal involvements in a single Champions League season, set in the 2011–12 season, after scoring and assisting twice in a 4–0 win over Borussia Dortmund in the first leg of the Champions League quarter-finals. On 19 April, Rapninha scored two goals in Barcelona's 4–3 La Liga victory over Celta Vigo, the latter of which marked his 50th goal for Barcelona. On 30 April, in the first leg of the semi-finals, he surpassed Messi's record with 20 goal contributions, after assisting in the 3–3 draw against Inter Milan. In the second leg, on 6 May, despite scoring his side's third goal, after being two goals down, Inter Milan came back and Barcelona lost the match 4–3, being eliminated in the semi-finals of the tournament.

Raphinha finished his Champions League campaign as joint top scorer with 13 goals, alongside Serhou Guirassy, and also led the tournament in assists with nine. On 11 May, he scored two goals against Real Madrid as Barcelona went on to win 4–3. On 22 May, Raphinha extended his contract with Barcelona until 30 June 2028.

==== 2025–26: Third league title and injury issues ====
On 16 August, Raphinha started in Barcelona's La Liga season opener against Mallorca, scoring their first goal of the league campaign with a seventh minute header assisted by Lamine Yamal, Barcelona went on to win the match 3–0. On 15 September 2025, Raphinha netted a brace in a 6–0 victory against Valencia. On 25 September, Raphinha sustained a mid-section tear of the right biceps femoris during a La Liga match against Real Oviedo, forcing him to be substituted in the 65th minute. He was initially expected to be sidelined for three weeks but setbacks meant that he could not return to the field until 22 November, when he came on as a late second half substitute for Dani Olmo in Barcelona's opening match at the partially renovated Camp Nou against Athletic Bilbao. After returning from injury, Raphinha immediately found his form, providing two assists in his second match back against Alavés, which was followed by a goal in his third match back in a 3–1 victory over Atlético Madrid after Barcelona conceded an early goal from Álex Baena. On 13 December, Raphinha scored both goals in a 2–0 win against Osasuna, reaching 60 official goals for Barcelona, which equalled Barcelona legend Johan Cruyff's tally.

On 11 January 2026, he netted a brace and was named man of the match in a 3–2 win over rivals Real Madrid in the Supercopa de España final, finishing the tournament as the top scorer with 4 goals. On 15 March, Raphinha scored his third hat-trick for Barcelona in a 5–2 win against Sevilla. Later that month, he suffered another hamstring injury in an international friendly against France, with both the Brazilian Football Confederation and Barcelona's medical staff predicting that recovery would take approximately five weeks, forcing him to miss crucial Champions League quarter-final matches against Atlético Madrid. Hansi Flick revealed that Raphinha was "very down" and "devastated" after the injury, prompting the club to grant him time off in Brazil with his family to clear his mind before beginning rehabilitation in Barcelona. On 10 May, he made his return from injury replacing Marcus Rashford in the 64th minute, as Barcelona won 2–0 over rivals Real Madrid in El Clásico, securing his club's 29th La Liga title, and his third league title with the club.

==== 2026–27: Captaincy ====
Following the departures of Marc-André ter Stegen and Ronald Araújo and the injury of Frenkie de Jong, Raphinha was named Barcelona's first provisional captain by manager Hansi Flick. On 23 August 2026, he scored his first goals of the season, netting a brace in a 5–0 away victory over Elche. On 5 September, he was confirmed as Barcelona's captain, becoming the first Brazilian player to hold the role in the club's history. As of 19 September, Raphinha had scored 14 goals in his first eight games, including consecutive hat-tricks against Racing Santander and Sevilla, with his form seeing him break Barcelona's record for the most goals scored in the opening games of a season. On 5 November, he extended his contract with the club until 2030.

== International career ==
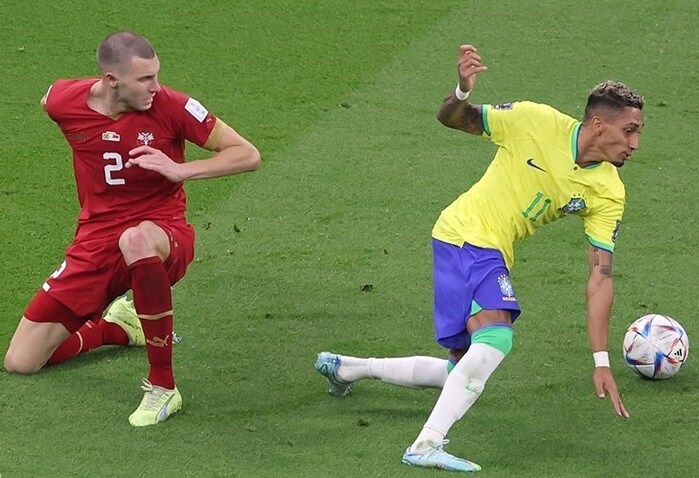
Raphinha (right) with Brazil playing against Serbia at the 2022 FIFA World Cup

Prior to UEFA Euro 2020, the Italian Football Federation attempted to call up Raphinha for the Italian national team, for whom Raphinha was eligible due to his father's heritage. Raphinha has stated that he was close to representing Italy, but did not receive an Italian passport in time to represent them at the tournament.

In August 2021, Raphinha was selected to represent Brazil for the team's World Cup qualifiers against Chile, Argentina and Peru. On 7 October, Raphinha made his full debut for the national side, coming on as a substitute at half time in a 3–1 comeback win against Venezuela. He assisted two goals and won a penalty in 45 minutes on the pitch, receiving praise from sports pundits and fans. On 15 October, he scored his first two international goals in a qualifying match against Uruguay.

On 7 November 2022, Raphinha was named in the squad for the 2022 FIFA World Cup by manager Tite. Brazil reached the quarter-finals of the tournament, where they were eliminated by Croatia on 9 December, following a 4–2 penalty shoot-out loss after a 1–1 draw.

On 10 May, Raphinha was called up for Brazil to participate in the 2024 Copa América. He scored his only goal of the tournament against Colombia in their third group phase game, in a 1–1 draw. Brazil were eliminated from the tournament following a 4–2 penalty shoot-out defeat after a goalless draw against Uruguay in the quarter-finals.

In May 2026, Raphinha was selected for Brazil's squad for the 2026 FIFA World Cup.

== Style of play ==
Raphinha is a versatile winger known for his technical ability, agility, pace and defensive work rate. Primarily operating on the right-wing, he uses his left foot to cut inside, creating goal-scoring opportunities or delivering passes into dangerous areas. His dribbling, characterized by close control, rapid changes of direction, and a blend of speed and creativity, allows him to beat defenders in one-on-one situations. A proficient passer, Raphinha delivers accurate crosses and threads passes into the box, stretching opposition defenses while also operating effectively in tight spaces. Defensively, he plays an important role in counter-pressing, regaining possession by tracking back to support full-backs or disrupting opposition build-up play.

At Barcelona under Hansi Flick, Raphinha's tactical role evolved from a traditional winger to a more centrally positioned role as a second striker. This shift allowed him to exploit spaces between the opposition's defensive and midfield lines, making diagonal runs into the box or drifting inward while other forwards, such as Robert Lewandowski, provided width. By not being confined to the flank, Raphinha stretched the defensive structure, creating additional space and opportunities for himself and his teammates. His quick change of pace and intelligent movement enabled link-up play with players like Dani Olmo, while also supporting attacking moves from deeper positions.

== Personal life ==
Raphinha has a long-standing friendship with Bruno Fernandes, starting before they became teammates at Sporting CP. He is on record saying Fernandes has been a huge help to him and his footballing career.

== Career statistics ==
=== Club ===
As of match played 22 November 2026

Appearances and goals by club, season and competition
Club	Season	League			National cup (Note: Includes Taça de Portugal, Coupe de France, FA Cup, Copa del Rey)		League cup (Note: Includes Taça da Liga, Coupe de la Ligue)		Europe		Other		Total	
Club	Season	Division	Apps	Goals	Apps	Goals	Apps	Goals	Apps	Goals	Apps	Goals	Apps	Goals
Vitória Guimarães B	2015–16	LigaPro	16	5	—		—		—		—		16	5
Vitória Guimarães	2015–16	Primeira Liga	1	0	0	0	0	0	—		—		1	0
Vitória Guimarães	2016–17	Primeira Liga	32	4	7	0	2	0	—		—		41	4
Vitória Guimarães	2017–18	Primeira Liga	32	15	1	1	3	1	6 (Note: Appearances in UEFA Europa League)	0	1 (Note: Appearance in Supertaça Cândido de Oliveira)	1	43	18
Vitória Guimarães	Total		65	19	8	1	5	1	6	0	1	1	85	22
Sporting CP	2018–19	Primeira Liga	24	4	4	0	4	2	4	1	—		36	7
Sporting CP	2019–20	Primeira Liga	4	2	—		—		—		1	0	5	2
Sporting CP	Total		28	6	4	0	4	2	4	1	1	0	41	9
Rennes	2019–20	Ligue 1	22	5	3	2	1	0	4	0	—		30	7
Rennes	2020–21	Ligue 1	6	1	—		—		—		—		6	1
Rennes	Total		28	6	3	2	1	0	4	0	—		36	8
Leeds United	2020–21	Premier League	30	6	1	0	—		—		—		31	6
Leeds United	2021–22	Premier League	35	11	1	0	0	0	—		—		36	11
Leeds United	Total		65	17	2	0	0	0	—		—		67	17
Barcelona	2022–23	La Liga	36	7	5	2	—		7 (Note: Five appearances in UEFA Champions League, two appearances and one goal in UEFA Europa League)	1	2 (Note: Appearance(s) in Supercopa de España)	0	50	10
Barcelona	2023–24	La Liga	28	6	1	1	—		7 (Note: Appearances in UEFA Champions League)	3	1	0	37	10
Barcelona	2024–25	La Liga	36	18	5	1	—		14	13	2	2	57	34
Barcelona	2025–26	La Liga	22	13	2	1	—		7	3	2	4	33	21
Barcelona	2026–27	La Liga	12	15	0	0	—		3	4	0	0	15	19
Barcelona	Total		134	59	13	5	—		38	24	7	6	192	94
Career total			336	112	30	8	10	3	52	25	9	7	437	155

=== International ===
As of match played 29 September 2026

Appearances and goals by national team and year
National team	Year	Apps	Goals
Brazil	2021	5	2
Brazil	2022	11	3
Brazil	2023	4	1
Brazil	2024	11	4
Brazil	2025	5	1
Brazil	2026	7	1
Total		43	12

As of match played 29 September 2026
Brazil score listed first, score column indicates score after each Raphinha goal.

List of international goals scored by Raphinha
No.	Date	Venue	Cap	Opponent	Score	Result	Competition
1	14 October 2021	Arena da Amazônia, Manaus, Brazil	3	Uruguay	2–0	4–1	2022 FIFA World Cup qualification
2	14 October 2021	Arena da Amazônia, Manaus, Brazil	3	Uruguay	3–0	4–1	2022 FIFA World Cup qualification
3	1 February 2022	Mineirão, Belo Horizonte, Brazil	7	Paraguay	1–0	4–0	2022 FIFA World Cup qualification
4	27 September 2022	Parc de Princes, Paris, France	11	Tunisia	1–0	5–1	Friendly
5	27 September 2022	Parc de Princes, Paris, France	11	Tunisia	4–1	5–1	Friendly
6	8 September 2023	Mangueirão, Belém, Brazil	17	Bolivia	2–0	5–1	2026 FIFA World Cup qualification
7	2 July 2024	Levi's Stadium, Santa Clara, United States	26	Colombia	1–0	1–1	2024 Copa América
8	15 October 2024	Estádio Nacional Mané Garrincha, Brasília, Brazil	29	Peru	1–0	4–0	2026 FIFA World Cup qualification
9	15 October 2024	Estádio Nacional Mané Garrincha, Brasília, Brazil	29	Peru	2–0	4–0	2026 FIFA World Cup qualification
10	14 November 2024	Estadio Monumental, Maturín, Venezuela	30	Venezuela	1–0	1–1	2026 FIFA World Cup qualification
11	20 March 2025	Estádio Nacional Mané Garrincha, Brasília, Brazil	32	Colombia	1–0	2–1	2026 FIFA World Cup qualification
12	29 September 2026	Lang Park, Brisbane, Australia	43	Australia	2–2	4–2	Friendly

== Honours ==
Sporting CP

- Taça de Portugal: 2018–19
- Taça da Liga: 2018–19

Barcelona

- La Liga: 2022–23, 2024–25, 2025–26
- Copa del Rey: 2024–25
- Supercopa de España: 2023, 2025, 2026

Individual

- Vitória de Guimarães Breakthrough Player of the Year: 2017
- Copa América Team of the Tournament: 2024
- La Liga Player of the Month: August 2024, August 2026, September 2026
- IFFHS Men's CONMEBOL Team: 2024, 2025
- La Liga Player of the Season: 2024–25
- La Liga Team of the Season: 2024–25 2025–26
- UEFA Champions League top scorer: 2024–25 (shared)
- UEFA Champions League Team of the Season: 2024–25
- The Athletic European Men's Team of the Season: 2024–25
- The Athletic European Men's Player of the Season: 2024–25
- The Athletic La Liga Team of the Season: 2024–25
