= Falaye Sacko =

Malian footballer

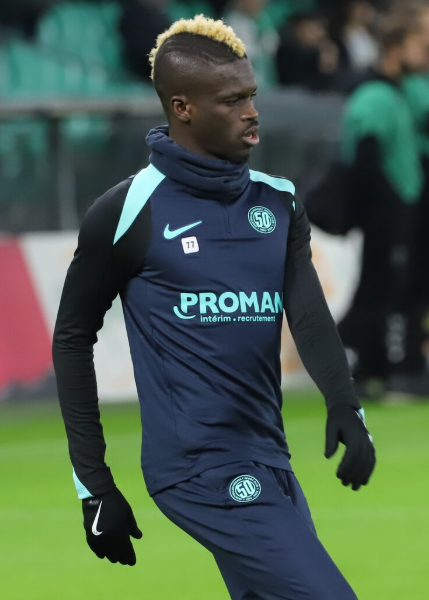
- Sacko with Montpellier in 2024

Personal information
- Date of birth: 1 May 1995 (age 31)
- Place of birth: Bamako, Mali
- Height: 1.79 m (5 ft 10 in)
- Position: Right-back

Team information
- Current team: Neftçi
- Number: 77

Senior career*
Years	Team	Apps	(Gls)
2014–2015	Djoliba AC		
2015–2016	Újpest	0	(0)
2015–2016	→ Sint-Truiden (loan)	0	(0)
2016–2017	Vitória de Guimarães B	63	(0)
2017–2023	Vitória de Guimarães	99	(1)
2022	→ Saint-Étienne (loan)	9	(0)
2022–2023	→ Montpellier (loan)	35	(1)
2023–2025	Montpellier	35	(0)
2025–	Neftçi	28	(0)

International career^{‡}
2018–	Mali	40	(1)
- * Club domestic league appearances and goals as of 22 June 2026 ‡ National team caps and goals as of 23:51, 6 June 2024 (UTC)

Falaye Sacko (born 1 May 1995) is a Malian professional footballer who plays as a right-back for Azerbaijani Premier League club Neftçi and the Mali national team.

== Club career ==
Sacko made his professional debut in the Segunda Liga for Vitória de Guimarães B on 17 February 2016 in a game against Atlético CP.

On 31 January 2022, the last day of the Portuguese transfer window, Sacko was loaned to Saint-Étienne. On 1 July 2022, he joined Montpellier on loan for the season.

On the 10th of August 2025, Sacko joined Neftçi on a free transfer signing a two-year contract, with an additional year as an option.

== International career ==
Sacko made his international debut for the Mali national team in a 1–1 friendly tie with Japan on 23 March 2018.

He then played four matches during the second half of 2018 as part of the 2019 Africa Cup of Nations qualification.

On 16 June 2019, Sacko scored his first goal for Mali in a friendly match against Algeria, although his team was defeated 3–2. He took part in his first international tournament at the 2019 Africa Cup of Nations.

In December 2021, Sacko was named by head coach Mohamed Magassouba in Mali's squad for the 2021 Africa Cup of Nations.

On 2 January 2024, he was included in the list of twenty-seven Malian players selected by Éric Chelle to compete in the 2023 Africa Cup of Nations.

== Career statistics ==
=== Club ===
As of match played 27 April 2025

Appearances and goals by club, season and competition
Club	Season	League			National cup		League cup		Continental		Other		Total	
Club	Season	Division	Apps	Goals	Apps	Goals	Apps	Goals	Apps	Goals	Apps	Goals	Apps	Goals
Sint-Truiden	2015–16	Belgian Pro League	0	0	1	0	—		—		—		1	0
Vitória B	2015–16	LigaPro	6	0	—		—		—		—		6	0
Vitória B	2016–17	LigaPro	35	0	—		—		—		—		35	0
Vitória B	Total		41	0	—		—		—		—		41	0
Vitória de Guimarães	2016–17	Primeira Liga	1	0	0	0	0	0	—		—		1	0
Vitória de Guimarães	2017–18	Primeira Liga	6	0	0	0	0	0	—		0	0	6	0
Vitória de Guimarães	2018–19	Primeira Liga	28	0	2	0	0	0	—		—		30	0
Vitória de Guimarães	2019–20	Primeira Liga	22	0	0	0	2	0	8 (Note: Appearances in UEFA Europa League)	0	—		32	0
Vitória de Guimarães	2020–21	Primeira Liga	28	0	1	0	1	0	—		—		30	0
Vitória de Guimarães	2021–22	Primeira Liga	13	1	1	0	3	0	—		—		17	0
Vitória de Guimarães	Total		78	0	4	0	6	0	8	0	0	0	96	0
Saint-Étienne	2021–22	Ligue 1	9	0	0	0	—		—		2 (Note: Appearances in Ligue 1 relegation/promotion play-offs)	0	11	0
Montpellier (loan)	2022–23	Ligue 1	35	1	1	0	—		—		—		36	1
Montpellier	2023–24	Ligue 1	19	0	0	0	—		—		—		19	0
Montpellier	2024–25	Ligue 1	16	0	0	0	—		—		—		16	0
Montpellier	Total		35	0	0	0	—		—		—		35	0
Career total			218	1	6	0	6	0	8	0	2	0	240	1

=== International ===
As of match played 6 June 2024

Appearances and goals by national team and year
National team	Year	Apps	Goals
Mali	2017	1	0
Mali	2018	5	0
Mali	2019	6	1
Mali	2020	2	0
Mali	2021	10	0
Mali	2022	6	0
Mali	2023	5	0
Mali	2024	5	0
Total		40	1

Scores and results list Mali's goal tally first, score column indicates score after each Sacko goal.

List of international goals scored by Falaye Sacko
No.	Date	Venue	Opponent	Score	Result	Competition
1	16 June 2019	Jassim bin Hamad Stadium, Doha, Qatar	Algeria	2–1	2–3	Friendly
