= Kiko Rodrigues =

Portuguese footballer

Kiko
Personal information
- Full name: Francisco Daniel Simões Rodrigues
- Date of birth: 27 February 1997 (age 29)
- Place of birth: Aveiro, Portugal
- Height: 1.80 m (5 ft 11 in)
- Position: Midfielder

Team information
- Current team: Águeda
- Number: 80

Youth career
- 2005–2006: Taboeira
- 2006–2014: Benfica
- 2014–2015: Vitória Guimarães

Senior career*
Years	Team	Apps	(Gls)
2016–2019	Vitória Guimarães B	52	(3)
2016–2019	Vitória Guimarães	6	(0)
2018–2019	→ Estoril (loan)	0	(0)
2020–2022	Felgueiras 1932	38	(0)
2022–2024	Beira-Mar	40	(2)
2024–	Águeda	18	(4)

International career
2015	Portugal U18	4	(0)
2016	Portugal U19	3	(0)
- * Club domestic league appearances and goals as of 20:12, 20 January 2025 (UTC)

Francisco Daniel Simões Rodrigues (born 27 February 1997) known as Kiko, is a Portuguese footballer who plays for R.D. Águeda as a midfielder.

== Career ==
On 12 August 2016, Kiko made his professional debut with Vitória Guimarães B in a 2016–17 LigaPro match against Aves.
