= Fábio Sturgeon =

Portuguese footballer

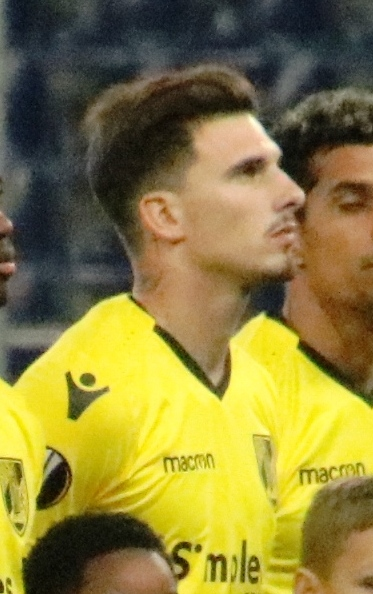
- Sturgeon with Vitória Guimarães in 2017

Personal information
- Full name: Fábio Miguel dos Santos Sturgeon
- Date of birth: 4 February 1994 (age 32)
- Place of birth: Almada, Portugal
- Height: 1.83 m (6 ft 0 in)
- Position: Attacking midfielder

Team information
- Current team: Sogndal
- Number: 23

Youth career
- 2003–2007: Charneca da Caparica
- 2007–2010: Pescadores
- 2010–2013: Belenenses

Senior career*
| Years | Team | Apps | (Gls) |
| 2011–2017 | Belenenses | 98 | (8) |
| 2017–2018 | Vitória Guimarães | 31 | (0) |
| 2018–2020 | Feirense | 28 | (2) |
| 2019–2020 | → Xanthi (loan) | 32 | (1) |
| 2020–2021 | OFI | 31 | (6) |
| 2021–2022 | Raków Częstochowa | 24 | (1) |
| 2023–2024 | Mafra | 14 | (0) |
| 2025– | Sogndal | 19 | (0) |

International career
| 2014 | Portugal U20 | 5 | (0) |
| 2014 | Portugal U21 | 1 | (0) |
- * Club domestic league appearances and goals as of 00:26, 23 June 2026 (UTC)

Fábio Miguel dos Santos Sturgeon (born 4 February 1994) is a Portuguese professional footballer who plays as an attacking midfielder for Norwegian First Division club Sogndal.

== Club career ==
Born in Almada, Setúbal District to an English father and a Portuguese mother, Sturgeon joined C.F. Os Belenenses' youth system at the age of 16. He made his professional debut with the first team while still a junior, playing one minute in a 0–0 away draw against F.C. Penafiel in the first round of the Taça da Liga.

Sturgeon first appeared in the Segunda Liga on 24 April 2013, coming on as a half-time substitute for Yacine Si Salem in a 0–2 home loss to U.D. Oliveirense. He made four appearances as his team won the league title, getting a first start on 12 May in a 2–1 win at C.D. Trofense.

After being used mostly off the bench in Belenenses' first season back in the Primeira Liga, Sturgeon made his breakthrough in 2014–15, playing 31 games and starting all but four. In the opener, on 17 August 2014, he scored his first professional goal in the sixth minute of a 3–1 away win against Penafiel, and his second came on 4 April in a 2–0 victory over Moreirense F.C. at the Estádio do Restelo.

Sturgeon started all ten fixtures in the 2015–16 edition of the UEFA Europa League, in an eventual group stage exit. On 26 January 2017, after having been tracked by Celtic of Scotland, he signed a four-and-a-half-year contract at Vitória SC. He totalled 38 scoreless matches during his spell, including their 3–1 loss to S.L. Benfica in the Supertaça Cândido de Oliveira on 5 August 2017.

In July 2018, Sturgeon moved to another top-flight team, C.D. Feirense, on a three-year deal. In just his second game, he opened his account on 20 August with the only goal of a win over his former team at the Estádio D. Afonso Henriques.

On 20 July 2019, Sturgeon was loaned to Xanthi F.C. of the Super League Greece with a buying option. In the summer of 2020, he signed a permanent contract with OFI Crete F.C. in the same country. His first goal came on 18 October, in a 2–2 home draw against Panathinaikos FC.

Sturgeon joined Polish Ekstraklasa club Raków Częstochowa on 10 August 2021, agreeing to an initial three-year deal. On 1 September 2022, however, he left by mutual consent.

Sturgeon returned to Portugal in September 2023 after four years away, on a contract at second-tier C.D. Mafra. On 22 July 2025, the 31-year-old free agent signed with Norwegian First Division's Sogndal Fotball.

== International career ==
Sturgeon was eligible to represent England and Portugal internationally. He appeared for the under-20 team of the latter at the 2014 Toulon Tournament, and won his only cap for the under-21s on 13 November 2014, playing 21 minutes in a 3–1 away friendly defeat against England.

== Honours ==
Belenenses

- Segunda Liga: 2012–13

Raków Częstochowa

- Ekstraklasa: 2022–23
- Polish Cup: 2021–22
