= Restinga, Porto Alegre =

Neighborhood in Porto Alegre

Restinga is a neighbourhood (bairro) in the city of Porto Alegre, the state capital of Rio Grande do Sul, in Brazil. It was created by Law 6571 from January 8, 1990.

One of biggest and most populated neighbourhoods in Porto Alegre, Restinga is home to 27 different shanty-towns today, but the three original slum areas are called Ilhota, Theodora and Marítimos, which were formed during the 1940s and the 1950s by poor migrants groups from country towns. Despite the City Hall efforts to improve its inhabitants' living conditions, there is still infrastructure scarcity in Restinga.

== Notable people ==
The following were born or raised in Restinga. Some became famous after they moved away.

- Paulo César Fonseca do Nascimento ("Tinga"), footballer
- Raphinha, footballer
