= Assis (footballer, born 1989) =

Brazilian footballer

Personal information
- Full name: Assis Giovanaz
- Date of birth: 4 October 1989 (age 37)
- Place of birth: Garibaldi, Brazil
- Height: 1.87 m (6 ft 1 1/2 in)
- Position: Goalkeeper

Youth career
- 2001−2007: América Mineiro
- 2007−2008: Belenenses

Senior career*
Years	Team	Apps	(Gls)
2008–2010	Belenenses	2	(0)
2010−2016	Vitória Guimarães	18	(0)
2010–2011	→ Lousada (loan)	13	(0)
2011–2012	→ Freamunde (loan)	14	(0)
2012−2016	Vitória Guimarães B	57	(0)
2016–2017	Leixões	20	(0)
2017–2019	Boavista	1	(0)
2020	Juventus-SC	6	(0)
2021	Garibaldi	0	(0)
- * Club domestic league appearances and goals as of 21:29, 5 September 2021 (UTC)

Assis Giovanaz (born 4 October 1989), known as Assis, is a Brazilian professional footballer who plays as a goalkeeper.

== Club career ==
Born in Garibaldi, Rio Grande do Sul, Giovanaz started his youth career at América Mineiro, finishing it in Portugal at C.F. Os Belenenses. He made his professional debut with the latter on 13 February 2010, playing 11 minutes in a 1–0 away loss against S.L. Benfica in the Primeira Liga after Bruno Vale was sent off.

In 2010, Assis signed with fellow league club Vitória de Guimarães, being initially assigned to their reserves in the Segunda Liga and going on to be loaned twice. His biggest league input with the first team consisted of 16 matches, in the 2014–15 season.

On 7 July 2016, Assis joined Portuguese second division club Leixões S.C. as a free agent. He returned to the top tier the following campaign, moving to Boavista F.C. on a two-year contract.
