= Marcos Valente =

Portuguese footballer

Personal information
- Full name: Marcos André Costa Valente
- Date of birth: 4 February 1994 (age 32)
- Place of birth: Penafiel, Portugal
- Height: 1.95 m (6 ft 5 in)
- Position: Centre-back

Team information
- Current team: Cinfães

Youth career
- 2002–2005: Penafiel
- 2005–2008: Porto
- 2008–2013: Penafiel

Senior career*
| Years | Team | Apps | (Gls) |
| 2013 | Penafiel | 4 | (0) |
| 2013–2016 | Benfica B | 44 | (3) |
| 2015–2016 | → Aves (loan) | 39 | (0) |
| 2016–2018 | Vitória Guimarães B | 45 | (3) |
| 2017–2020 | Vitória Guimarães | 10 | (0) |
| 2018–2019 | → Paços Ferreira (loan) | 6 | (0) |
| 2019–2020 | → Estoril (loan) | 20 | (1) |
| 2020–2021 | Estoril | 9 | (0) |
| 2021 | Trofense | 0 | (0) |
| 2021–2022 | Vilafranquense | 26 | (1) |
| 2022–2023 | Trofense | 24 | (1) |
| 2023–2025 | Lusitânia | 48 | (4) |
| 2025–2026 | Marco 09 | 10 | (0) |
| 2026– | Cinfães | 7 | (0) |
- * Club domestic league appearances and goals as of 10:21, 2 April 2026 (UTC)

Marcos André Costa Valente (born 4 February 1994) is a Portuguese professional footballer who plays as a centre-back for Campeonato de Portugal club Cinfães.

== Club career ==
Born in Penafiel, Valente had two youth spells at local club F.C. Penafiel, the last starting at the age of 14. On 17 February 2013, while still a junior, he first appeared in a Segunda Liga game, playing the full 90 minutes in a 0–0 away draw against C.D. Feirense.

In June 2013, Valente joined S.L. Benfica on a five-year contract, being assigned to the reserve team who also competed in the second tier. He played 37 matches in his second season, scoring his first league goal on 17 August 2014 in the 2–1 away loss to Leixões SC; additionally, in 2015–16, he served a loan at C.D. Aves in the same league.

Valente signed a permanent deal with Vitória S.C. on 1 July 2016. His maiden appearance in the Primeira Liga took place on 19 August of the following year, when he started in a 0–5 home defeat against Sporting CP.

== Career statistics ==
As of end of the 2014–15 season

| Club | Season | Domestic League | | Domestic Cup | | League Cup | | Continental | | Total | |
| Club | Season | Apps | Goals | Apps | Goals | Apps | Goals | Apps | Goals | Apps | Goals |
|---|---|---|---|---|---|---|---|---|---|---|---|
| Penafiel | 2012–13 | 4 | 0 | 0 | 0 | 0 | 0 | — | — | 4 | 0 |
| Benfica B | 2013–14 | 7 | 0 | — | — | — | — | — | — | 7 | 0 |
| Benfica B | 2014–15 | 37 | 3 | — | — | — | — | — | — | 37 | 3 |
| Benfica B | Total | 44 | 3 | — | — | — | — | — | — | 44 | 3 |
| Career Total | | 48 | 3 | 0 | 0 | 0 | 0 | — | — | 48 | 3 |
