= Rafael Miranda =

Brazilian footballer (born 1984)

Personal information
- Full name: Rafael Miranda da Conceição
- Date of birth: August 11, 1984 (age 42)
- Place of birth: Belo Horizonte, Brazil
- Height: 1.78 m (5 ft 10 in)
- Position: Defensive midfielder

Youth career
- 2003–2004: Atlético Mineiro

Senior career*
Years	Team	Apps	(Gls)
2005–2009	Atlético Mineiro	56	(0)
2009	→ Atlético Paranaense (loan)	30	(0)
2010–2013	Marítimo	90	(5)
2013–2015	Bahia	72	(3)
2015–2016	ABC	31	(2)
2016	Ferroviária	17	(1)
2016–2018	Vitória Guimarães	47	(3)
- * Club domestic league appearances and goals

Rafael Miranda da Conceição or simply Rafael Miranda (born August 11, 1984), is a former Brazilian defensive midfielder.

== Career ==
On 8 January 2010, Marítimo signed Brazilian midfielder from Atlético Mineiro until June 2013.

On 15 June 2016, he signed for Vitória Guimarães.

== Honours ==
Atlético Mineiro

- Brazilian Série B: 2006
- Minas Gerais State League: 2007
