= Paolo Hurtado =

Peruvian footballer (born 1990)

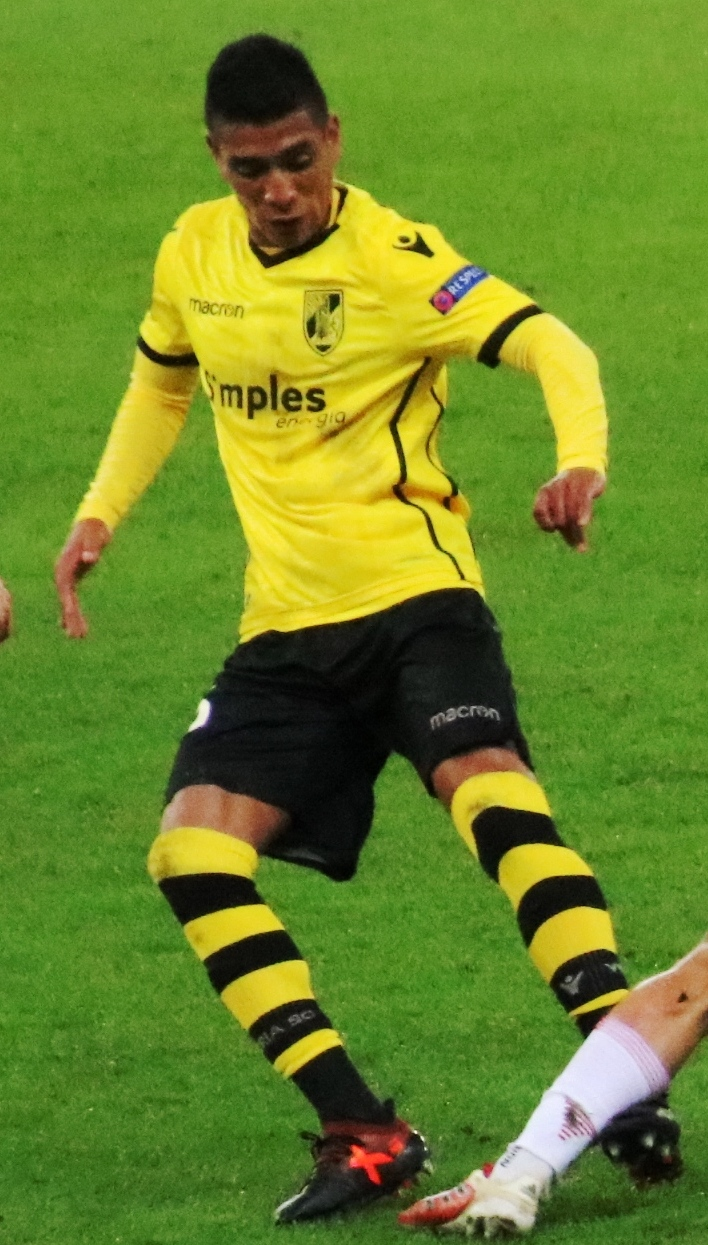
- Hurtado playing for Vitória Guimarães in 2017

Personal information
- Full name: Cristopher Paolo César Hurtado Huertas
- Date of birth: 27 July 1990 (age 36)
- Place of birth: Callao, Peru
- Height: 1.74 m (5 ft 9 in)
- Positions: Winger; forward

Team information
- Current team: Barranco City

Youth career
- 2005–2007: Alianza Lima

Senior career*
Years	Team	Apps	(Gls)
2008–2012	Alianza Lima	73	(12)
2009	→ Juan Aurich (loan)	21	(2)
2012–2015	Paços Ferreira	74	(13)
2014	→ Peñarol (loan)	14	(0)
2015–2017	Reading	6	(0)
2016–2017	→ Vitória Guimarães (loan)	47	(10)
2017–2018	Vitória Guimarães	33	(15)
2018–2021	Konyaspor	35	(6)
2021	Lokomotiv Plovdiv	2	(0)
2021–2022	Unión Española	4	(1)
2022	Alianza Lima	7	(0)
2023	Cienciano	19	(0)
2024	Carlos A. Mannucci	19	(0)
2025	Comerciantes	15	(3)
2026	Unión Huaral	16	(8)
2026–	Barranco City	0	(0)

International career^{‡}
2011–2019	Peru	38	(3)
Medal record
Men's football
Representing Peru
Copa América
Third place	2015 Chile
- * Club domestic league appearances and goals as of 19 October 2024 ‡ National team caps and goals as of 9 June 2019

Cristopher Paolo César Hurtado Huertas (born 27 July 1990), commonly known as Paolo Hurtado, is a Peruvian professional footballer who plays as a winger for Barranco City.

== Club career ==
=== Alianza Lima ===
Hurtado made his first team debut with Alianza Lima on 17 February 2008. Knowing he would not have much opportunities in Alianza he decide to go out on loan to Juan Aurich. After a successful loan period Hurtado became a regular in the Alianza Lima first team, proving to be one of their most influential players.

=== Paços de Ferreira ===
In 2012, he signed with Portuguese team Paços de Ferreira and swiftly proved his worth, becoming a key player.

=== Reading ===
On 12 August 2015, Hurtado signed a three-year contract with Reading of the Championship. After struggling to settle in England and also struggling for game time at Reading, Hurtado signed a loan deal with Vitória de Guimarães on 28 January 2016 until 30 June 2016. On 3 August 2016, Reading confirmed that Hurtado had returned to Vitória de Guimarães on a season-long loan.

=== Vitória Guimarães ===
On 20 July 2017, Reading confirmed that Hurtado had moved to Vitória de Guimarães permanently for an undisclosed fee.

== International career ==
In May 2018 Hurtado was named in the Peru national team's provisional 24-man squad for the 2018 FIFA World Cup in Russia.

== Career statistics ==
=== Club ===
As of match played 30 September 2018

Appearances and goals by club, season and competition
Club	Season	League			National cup		League cup		Continental		Other		Total	
Club	Season	Division	Apps	Goals	Apps	Goals	Apps	Goals	Apps	Goals	Apps	Goals	Apps	Goals
Alianza Lima	2008	Torneo Descentralizado	17	2	0	0	–		0	0	0	0	17	2
Alianza Lima	2009	Torneo Descentralizado	0	0	0	0	–		0	0	0	0	0	0
Alianza Lima	2010	Torneo Descentralizado	36	8	0	0	–		0	0	0	0	36	8
Alianza Lima	2011	Torneo Descentralizado	29	4	0	0	–		0	0	0	0	29	4
Alianza Lima	2012	Torneo Descentralizado	1	0	0	0	–		6 (Note: Appearances in the Copa Libertadores)	1	0	0	7	1
Alianza Lima	Total		83	14	0	0	0	0	6	1	0	0	89	13
Juan Aurich {loan}	2009	Torneo Descentralizado	20	2	0	0	–		–		0	0	20	2
Paços de Ferreira	2012–13	Primeira Liga	28	8	4	0	5	0	–		–		37	8
Paços de Ferreira	2013–14	Primeira Liga	8	0	0	0	0	0	6 (Note: Two appearances in the Champions League and four in the Europa League)	0	–		14	0
Paços de Ferreira	2014–15	Primeira Liga	21	4	1	0	1	1	–		–		23	5
Paços de Ferreira	Total		57	12	5	0	6	1	6	0	0	0	74	13
Peñarol (loan)	2013–14	Uruguayan Primera División	10	0	–		–		4	0	–		14	0
Reading	2015–16	Championship	5	0	0	0	1	0	–		–		6	0
Reading	2016–17	Championship	0	0	0	0	0	0	–		–		0	0
Reading	Total		5	0	0	0	1	0	0	0	0	0	6	0
Vitória de Guimarães (loan)	2015–16	Primeira Liga	7	1	0	0	–		–		–		7	1
Vitória de Guimarães (loan)	2016–17	Primeira Liga	31	6	4	2	3	1	–		–		38	9
Vitória de Guimarães (loan)	Total		38	7	4	2	3	1	0	0	0	0	45	10
Vitória de Guimarães	2017–18	Primeira Liga	25	11	1	0	1	2	5 (Note: Appearances in the UEFA Europa League)	2	1	0	33	15
Konyaspor	2018–19	Süper Lig	5	0	1	1	–		–		–		6	1
Career total			243	46	12	3	11	4	21	3	1	0	287	54

=== International ===
Appearances and goals by national team and year
National team	Year	Apps	Goals
Peru	2011	2	0
Peru	2012	2	0
Peru	2013	7	2
Peru	2014	3	0
Peru	2015	11	0
Peru	2017	4	1
Peru	2018	7	0
Peru	2019	2	0
Total		38	3

Scores and results list Peru's goal tally first, score column indicates score after each Hurtado goal.

List of international goals scored by Paolo Hurtado
No.	Date	Venue	Opponent	Score	Result	Competition
1	26 March 2013	Estadio Nacional, Lima, Peru	Trinidad and Tobago	2–0	3–0	Friendly
2	10 September 2013	Estadio Anzoátegui, Puerto la Cruz, Venezuela	Venezuela	1–0	2–3	2014 FIFA World Cup qualification
3	5 September 2017	Estadio Olímpico Atahualpa, Quito, Ecuador	Ecuador	2–0	2–1	2018 FIFA World Cup qualification
