= Miguel Silva (footballer, born April 1995) =

Portuguese footballer

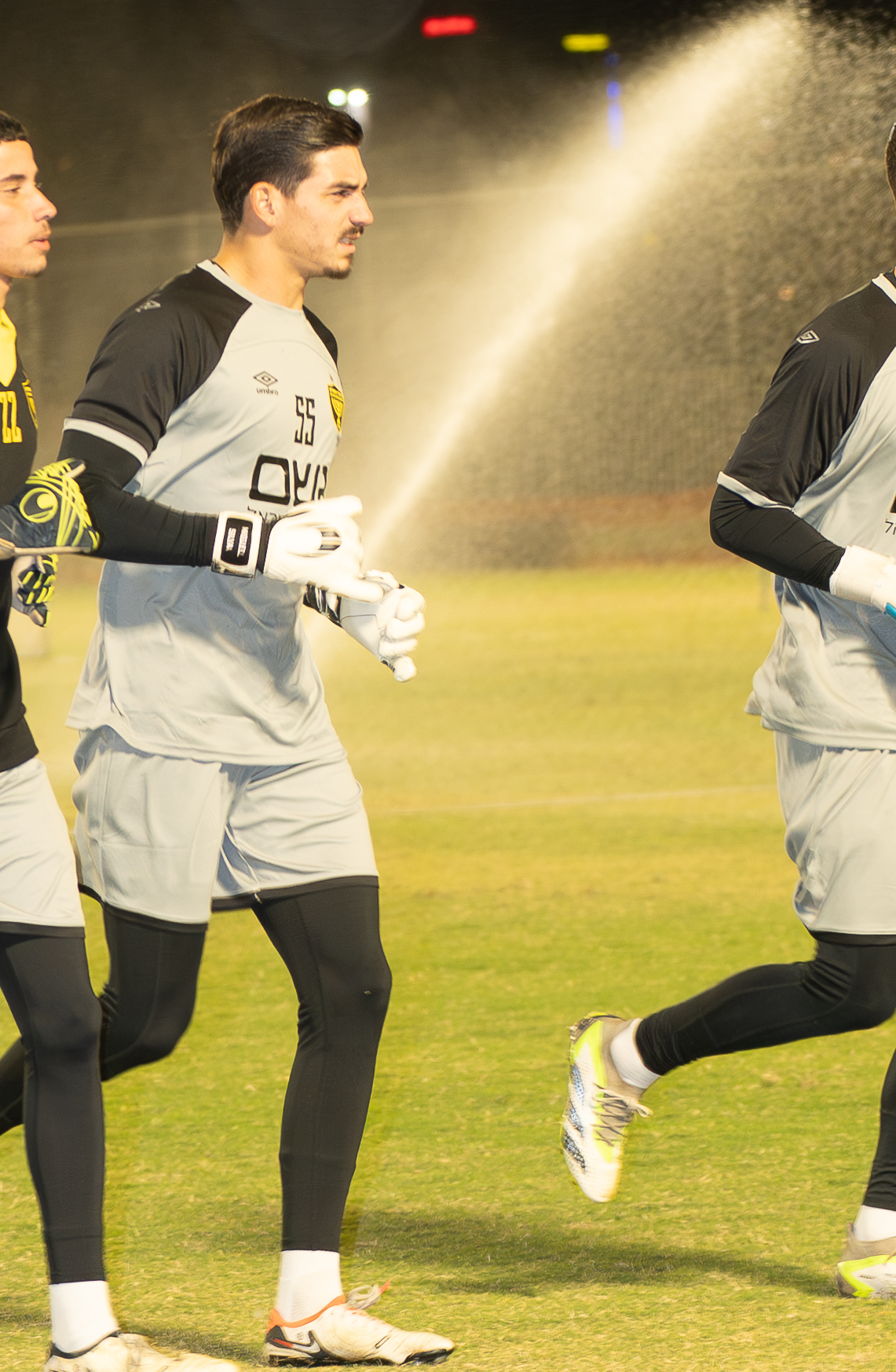
- Silva with Beitar Jerusalem in 2024

Personal information
- Full name: João Miguel Macedo Silva
- Date of birth: 7 April 1995 (age 31)
- Place of birth: Guimarães, Portugal
- Height: 1.90 m (6 ft 3 in)
- Position: Goalkeeper

Team information
- Current team: Beitar Jerusalem
- Number: 55

Youth career
- 2006–2009: CD Ponte
- 2009–2013: Vizela
- 2013–2014: Vitória Guimarães

Senior career*
Years	Team	Apps	(Gls)
2012–2013	Vizela	0	(0)
2014–2016	Vitória Guimarães B	12	(0)
2015–2020	Vitória Guimarães	60	(0)
2020–2021	APOEL	21	(0)
2021–2023	Marítimo	12	(0)
2023–	Beitar Jerusalem	110	(0)

International career
2016–2017	Portugal U21	2	(0)
2016	Portugal U23	1	(0)
- * Club domestic league appearances and goals as of 23:51, 21 May 2026 (UTC)

João Miguel Macedo Silva (born 7 April 1995) is a Portuguese professional footballer who plays as a goalkeeper for Israeli Premier League club Beitar Jerusalem.

He made 72 Primeira Liga appearances for Vitória de Guimarães and Marítimo, while also having spells in Cyprus with APOEL and in Israel with Beitar Jerusalem.

== Club career ==
=== Vitória Guimarães ===
Born in Guimarães, Silva joined the academy of local Vitória S.C. at the age of 18. He started playing as a senior with their reserves but, at the age of just 20, was promoted to the first team by manager Sérgio Conceição. His first match in the Primeira Liga occurred on 28 November 2015 in a 2–1 away win against Boavista FC, and he finished the season with a further 23 appearances as his team finished in tenth position.

In the following years, Silva constantly battled for first-choice status with Brazilian Douglas.

=== APOEL ===
Free agent Silva joined APOEL FC of the Cypriot First Division in July 2020, with Vitória keeping 62% of his sporting rights regarding any future transfer. On 25 September, in the third qualifying round of the UEFA Europa League, he saved two penalties as the side defeated HŠK Zrinjski Mostar in a shootout after a 2–2 home draw.

During his one-year spell in Nicosia, Silva played 25 competitive games.

=== Marítimo ===
Silva signed a three-year contract with C.S. Marítimo on 29 June 2021. Mainly backup to Paulo Vítor, he totalled 17 appearances for the Madeirans in one and a half seasons.

=== Beitar Jerusalem ===
On 28 January 2023, Silva agreed to a five-month deal at Israeli Premier League club Beitar Jerusalem FC; Marítimo remained entitled to a percentage of any future transfer. On 23 May, he played in the final of the State Cup, a 3–0 victory over Maccabi Netanya F.C. in Haifa.

== International career ==
Silva made his international debut on 28 March 2016 in the Portugal Olympic team's 4–0 friendly win over Mexico in the Azores, as a 60th-minute substitute for José Sá. He then won the first of two caps at under-21 level on 6 October, in a 3–3 away draw to Hungary for the 2017 UEFA European Championship qualifiers.

== Honours ==
Beitar Jerusalem

- Israel State Cup: 2022–23
