= 2017–18 S.C. Braga season =

Braga
- Chairman: António Salvador
- Manager: Abel Ferreira
- Stadium: Estádio Municipal de Braga
- Primeira Liga: 4th
- Taça de Portugal: Round of 32
- Taça da Liga: Group stage
- UEFA Europa League: Round of 32
- Top goalscorer: League: Paulinho (13); All: Paulinho (17)
Home colours	Away colours	Third colours

During the 2017–18 S.C. Braga season, the club competed in the Primeira Liga, Taça de Portugal, Taça da Liga and UEFA Europa League.

== Pre-season and friendlies ==
Win Draw Loss

5 July 2017 Friendly	Varzim	1–0	Braga
10:00		Summary

== Competitions ==
Win Draw Loss Fixtures

=== Primeira Liga ===
==== League table ====
Pos	Team	Pld	W	D	L	GF	GA	GD	Pts	Qualification or relegation
2	Benfica	34	25	6	3	80	22	+58	81	Qualification for the Champions League third qualifying round
3	Sporting CP	34	24	6	4	63	24	+39	78	Qualification for the Europa League group stage (Note: Desportivo das Aves qualified for the Europa league group stage by winning the 2017–18 Taça de Portugal. However, since they failed to obtain a license for European competitions, the spot awarded to the cup winners (Europa League group stage) was passed to the third-placed team, the spot awarded to the third-placed team (Europa League third qualifying round) was passed to the fourth-placed team, and the spot awarded to the fourth-placed team was passed to the fifth-placed team (Europa league second qualifying round).)
4	Braga	34	24	3	7	74	29	+45	75	Qualification for the Europa League third qualifying round
5	Rio Ave	34	15	6	13	40	42	−2	51	Qualification for the Europa League second qualifying round
6	Chaves	34	13	8	13	47	55	−8	47 (Note: Chaves finished ahead of Marítimo on head-to-head points: Chaves 4–1 Marítimo, Marítimo 1–2 Chaves.)	

Source: Liga Portugal
Rules for classification: 1) Points; 2) Head-to-head points; 3) Head-to-head goal difference; 4) Head-to-head away goals scored; 5) Goal difference; 6) Matches won; 7) Goals scored; 8) Play-off. (Note: only criteria 1, 5, 6 and 7 are applied to establish the classification during the competition.)

==== Results summary ====
Overall								Home						Away					
Pld	W	D	L	GF	GA	GD	Pts	W	D	L	GF	GA	GD	W	D	L	GF	GA	GD
34	24	3	7	74	29	+45	75	14	1	2	37	8	+29	10	2	5	37	21	+16

Last updated: 20 January 2018.

==== Results by matchday ====
Matchday	1	2	3	4	5	6	7	8	9	10	11	12	13	14	15	16	17	18	19	20	21	22	23	24	25	26	27	28	29	30	31	32	33	34
Ground	A	H	A	H	A	H	A	H	A	H	A	H	H	A	H	A	H	H	A	H	A	H	A	H	A	H	A	H	A	A	H	A	H	A
Result	L	W	W	L	L	W	W	W	W	W	D	W	W	L	W	W	W	L	W	W	L	W	W	W	W	W	W	W	D	W	W	W	D	L
Position	16	8	5	7	9	6	5	5	4	4	4	4	4	4	4	4	4	4	4	4	4	4	4	3	3	3	3	3	3	3	3	3	3	4

Updated to match(es) played on 20 January 2018. Source:
A = Away; H = Home; W = Win; D = Draw; L = Loss

==== Matches ====
9 August 2017 1	Benfica	3–1	Braga	Lisbon
21:00	Seferovic 15'; Jonas 30', (yellow card) 52'; Eliseu (yellow card) 39'; Salvio 57'	Report	Fonte (yellow card) 29'; Jefferson (yellow card) 37'; Kouka 44'; Danilo (yellow card) 78'	Stadium: Estádio da Luz; Attendance: 58,826; Referee: Carlos Xistra

13 August 2017 2	Braga	2–1	Portimonense	Braga
18:00	Bruno Viana (yellow card) 37'; Xadas 45+2'; Vukčević (yellow card) 50'; Fonte 68'; Silva (yellow card) 82'	Report	Paulinho 25', (yellow card) 38'; Sá (yellow card) 29'; Manafá (yellow card) 79'	Stadium: Estádio Municipal de Braga; Attendance: 10,421; Referee: João Capela

20 August 2017 3	Desportivo das Aves	0–2	Braga	Aves
20:00	Amilton (red card) 42'; Lenho (yellow card) 88'	Report	Danilo 57'; Esgaio 90+4'	Stadium: Estádio do CD Aves; Attendance: 2,781; Referee: Fábio Veríssimo

27 August 2017 4	Braga	0–1	Porto	Braga
20:15	Fransérgio (yellow card) 28'; Xadas (yellow card) 30'; Sequeira (yellow card) 82'	Report	Corona 7', (yellow card) 39'; Óliver (yellow card) 24'; D. Pereira (yellow card) 90+2'; R. Pereira (yellow card) 90+2'	Stadium: Estádio Municipal de Braga; Attendance: 21,382; Referee: Carlos Xistra

10 September 2017 5	Vitória de Setúbal	2–0	Braga	Setúbal
16:00	Paciência 24' (pen.); Amaral 26'; Issoko (yellow card) 49'; Fernandes (yellow card) 61'; Podstawski (yellow card) 90'	Report	Danilo (yellow card) 29'; Marcelo Goiano (yellow card) 82'; Teixeira (yellow card) 85'	Stadium: Estádio do Bonfim; Attendance: 2,636; Referee: Luís Ferreira

17 September 2017 6	Braga	2–1	Vitória de Guimarães	Braga
20:15	Teixeira (yellow card) 14'; Paulinho 23'; Kouka 45+1'; Silva (yellow card) 54'; Danilo (yellow card) 90'	Report	Raphinha 37'; Wakaso (yellow card) 39'; Pedrão (yellow card) 48'; García (yellow card) 75'	Stadium: Estádio Municipal de Braga; Attendance: 14,185; Referee: Rui Costa

24 September 2017 7	Tondela	1–2	Braga	Tondela
18:00	Moufi (red card) 4'; Murilo 18'; Cardoso (yellow card) 30'; Tomané (yellow card) 70'	Report	Kouka 44', (yellow card) 59'; Costa 46' (o.g.); Rosić (yellow card) 51'; Martins (yellow card) 62'	Stadium: Estádio João Cardoso; Attendance: 1,921; Referee: Tiago Martins

1 October 2017 8	Braga	6–0	Estoril	Braga
17:15	Sousa 17'; Silva 41'; Martins 55'; Xadas 57'; R. Horta 62', 84'	Report	Kléber (yellow card) 56'; Eduardo (yellow card) 64'	Stadium: Estádio Municipal de Braga; Attendance: 10,651; Referee: Hélder Malheiro

23 October 2017 9	Moreirense	0–1	Braga	Moreira de Cónegos
19:00	Belkaroui (yellow card) 49'; Cádiz (yellow card) 68'; Schons (yellow card) 89'	Report	Kouka (yellow card) 38'; Martins 89'; Esgaio (yellow card) 90+4'	Stadium: Parque Joaquim de Almeida Freitas; Attendance: 1,595; Referee: Jorge Sousa

29 October 2017 10	Braga	1–0	Chaves	Braga
16:00	Esgaio (yellow card) 26'; Jefferson (yellow card) 45+2'; Bruno Viana 58'; Paulinho (yellow card) 69'	Report	Maraš (yellow card) 90+3'	Stadium: Estádio Municipal de Braga; Attendance: 11,620; Referee: Bruno Esteves

5 November 2017 11	Sporting CP	2–2	Braga	Lisbon
20:15	Dost 66'; Pinto (yellow card) 82'; Fernandes 90+5' (pen.)	Report	Silva (yellow card) 34'; Esgaio (yellow card) 45'; Vukčević (yellow card) 68'; Sousa 85' (pen.); Danilo 89'	Stadium: Estádio José Alvalade; Attendance: 42,844; Referee: Carlos Xistra

27 November 2017 12	Braga	3–1	Feirense	Braga
19:00	Bruno Viana 9'; Paulinho 36', 38'	Report	Etebo (yellow card) 36', (goal) 45+2'; Cris (yellow card) 66'	Stadium: Estádio Municipal de Braga; Attendance: 7,845; Referee: Vasco Santos

3 December 2017 13	Braga	3–0	Paços de Ferreira	Braga
18:00	Esgaio (yellow card) 39'; Bruno Viana 70'; R. Horta 80'; Sousa 87', (yellow card) 87'	Report	Góis (yellow card) 54'; Silva (yellow card) 55' (yellow-red card) 65'	Stadium: Estádio Municipal de Braga; Attendance: 18,483; Referee: Rui Oliveira

11 December 2017 14	Marítimo	1–0	Braga	Funchal
21:00	Júnior 55'; Charles (yellow card) 77'; Pacheco (yellow card) 80'	Report	Marcelo Goiano (yellow card) 43'; Silva (yellow card) 82'; Vukčević (yellow card) 90+6'	Stadium: Estádio do Marítimo; Attendance: 6,327; Referee: Rui Costa

16 December 2017 15	Braga	4–0	Belenenses	Braga
20:30	Martins 37'; Sousa 56'; Silva 88'; Kouka 90+5'	Report		Stadium: Estádio Municipal de Braga; Attendance: 7,803; Referee: Hugo Miguel

3 January 2018 16	Boavista	1–3	Braga	Porto
18:15	Espinho (yellow card) 26'; Róbson (yellow card) 41' (yellow-red card) 78'; Kuca 50'; Rochinha (yellow card) 66'; Vagner (yellow card) 79'	Report	Danilo 14'; Silva (yellow card) 27' (yellow-red card) 59'; Jefferson (yellow card) 62'; Matheus (yellow card) 65'; Vukčević (yellow card) 65'; Esgaio (yellow card) 68'; Paulinho 79'; A. Horta 88'	Stadium: Estádio do Bessa; Attendance: 4,379; Referee: Jorge Sousa

6 January 2018 17	Braga	2–1	Rio Ave	Braga
20:30	R. Horta 19'; Kouka (yellow card) 29'; Martins 83'; Rosić (yellow card) 85'; A. Horta (yellow card) 90'; Matheus (yellow card) 90+4'	Report	Novais 42'; Marcelo (yellow card) 54'; Marcão (yellow card) 64'; Ribeiro (yellow card) 90+5'	Stadium: Estádio Municipal de Braga; Attendance: 8,513; Referee: Vasco Santos

13 January 2018 18	Braga	1–3	Benfica	Braga
20:30	Esgaio (yellow card) 41'; Paulinho 74'; Teixeira (yellow card) 85'	Report	Salvio 11'; Almeida (yellow card) 52'; Pizzi (yellow card) 56'; Jonas 64'; Fejsa (yellow card) 89'; Jiménez 90+1'	Stadium: Estádio Municipal de Braga; Attendance: 20,407; Referee: Artur Soares Dias

20 January 2018 19	Portimonense	1–2	Braga	Portimão
20:30	Fabrício 56' (pen.); Sá (yellow card) 81'	Report	Paulinho 8'; Eduardo 10'; Danilo (yellow card) 42'; Sequeira (yellow card) 65'; Bruno Viana (yellow card) 74'; Vukčević (yellow card) 79'	Stadium: Estádio Municipal de Portimão; Attendance: 2,833; Referee: Manuel Oliveira

30 January 2018 20	Braga	2–0	Desportivo das Aves	Braga
19:00	Silva 7'; Esgaio 47'	Report	Tissone (yellow card) 59'	Stadium: Estádio Municipal de Braga; Attendance: 7,607; Referee: Nuno Almeida

4 February 2018 21	Porto	3–1	Braga	Porto
20:30	Oliveira 13'; Reyes 37'; Aboubakar 73'; Herrera (yellow card) 84'	Report	Silva 30'; Paulinho (yellow card) 42'; Danilo (yellow card) 80'	Stadium: Estádio do Dragão; Attendance: 43,627; Referee: Hugo Miguel

10 February 2018 22	Braga	3–1	Vitória de Setúbal	Braga
18:15	Silva 25'; Paulinho 65'; Vukčević (yellow card) 74'; Esgaio 83'; Figueiras (yellow card) 89'	Report	Edinho (yellow card) 35'; Semedo (yellow card) 81'; Pereira 87', (yellow card) 87'; Pinto (yellow card) 90+5'	Stadium: Estádio Municipal de Braga; Attendance: 7,801; Referee: Jorge Sousa

18 February 2018 23	Vitória de Guimarães	0–5	Braga	Guimarães
20:15	Wakaso (red card) 30'; Tallo (yellow card) 36'	Report	Sousa 12'; Kouka 33'; Vukčević 43'; Eduardo 48'; Esgaio 60'	Stadium: Estádio D. Afonso Henriques; Attendance: 21,057; Referee: Bruno Paixão

26 February 2018 24	Braga	1–0	Tondela	Braga
19:00	Marcelo Goiano (yellow card) 21'; Bruno Viana (yellow card) 24'; Esgaio (yellow card) 35'; R. Horta 83'	Report	Delgado (yellow card) 38'; Fernandes (yellow card) 86'	Stadium: Estádio Municipal de Braga; Attendance: 6,050; Referee: Artur Soares Dias

3 March 2018 25	Estoril	0–6	Braga	Estoril
20:30	Kléber (yellow card) 22'; Allano (yellow card) 47'; Dankler (yellow card) 89'	Report	Eduardo 7'; Silva (yellow card) 36'; Paulinho 44', 68'; R. Horta 45+2', 90+3'; Martins 77'	Stadium: Estádio António Coimbra da Mota; Attendance: 1,043; Referee: Luís Godinho

9 March 2018 26	Braga	3–0	Moreirense	Braga
20:30	Eduardo 15', 64'; Vukčević (yellow card) 25'; R. Horta 66'	Report	Ângelo Neto (yellow card) 19'; Abarhoun (yellow card) 59'	Stadium: Estádio Municipal de Braga; Attendance: 5,237; Referee: Manuel Oliveira

18 March 2018 27	Chaves	1–4	Braga	Chaves
18:00	Platiny 76'; Duarte (yellow card) 82'	Report	Bruno Viana 28'; R. Horta 39', 90+1'; Paulinho 73'; Esgaio (yellow card) 75'	Stadium: Municipal Eng. Manuel Branco Teixeira; Attendance: 4,219; Referee: Bruno Paixão

31 March 2018 28	Braga	1–0	Sporting CP	Braga
20:30	A. Horta (yellow card) 30'; Vukčević (yellow card) 34'; Bruno Viana (yellow card) 40'; Silva 88'	Report	Piccini (yellow card) 57' (yellow-red card) 84'; Coentrão (yellow card) 78'	Stadium: Estádio Municipal de Braga; Attendance: 16,557; Referee: Luís Godinho

7 April 2018 29	Feirense	2–2	Braga	Santa Maria da Feira
18:15	Ramos (yellow card) 10'; Machado 61'; Silva (yellow card) 88'; Briseño 90+3'	Report	Lukić (yellow card) 5'; Marcelo Goiano (yellow card) 24'; Paulinho 30'; Bruno Viana (yellow card) 54'; Vukčević (yellow card) 59'; Sousa 83'; Martins (yellow card) 90+4'	Stadium: Estádio Marcolino de Castro; Attendance: 4,674; Referee: João Capela

15 April 2018 30	Paços de Ferreira	1–5	Braga	Paços de Ferreira
20:30	Góis (red card) 7'; Correia (yellow card) 45+1'; Luiz Phellype 57'	Report	Eduardo 17', 20'; Danilo (yellow card) 32', (goal) 72'; Lukić (yellow card) 59'; R. Horta 62'; Kouka (yellow card) 83'; Jefferson (yellow card) 89'; Sousa 90+2'	Stadium: Estádio da Mata Real; Attendance: 4,013; Referee: Fábio Veríssimo

20 April 2018 31	Braga	2–0	Marítimo	Braga
20:30	Bruno Viana (yellow card) 18'; Vukčević 52', (yellow card) 90+2'; Paulinho 86'	Report	Baiano (yellow card) 8'; Abedzadeh (yellow card) 68'; Jean Cléber (yellow card) 90+2'	Stadium: Estádio Municipal de Braga; Attendance: 12,564; Referee: Nuno Almeida

29 April 2018 32	Belenenses	0–1	Braga	Lisbon
20:15	Yebda (yellow card) 90+2'	Report	R. Horta (yellow card) 11'; Silva (yellow card) 11'; Paulinho 70'	Stadium: Estádio do Restelo; Attendance: 2,633; Referee: Tiago Martins

4 May 2018 33	Braga	1–1	Boavista	Braga
20:30	Silva (yellow card) 69'; Sousa 73'	Report	Njie 45'; Mateus (yellow card) 88'; Branco (yellow card) 90+3'; Talocha (yellow card) 90+7'	Stadium: Estádio Municipal de Braga; Attendance: 11,872; Referee: Bruno Esteves

13 May 2018 34	Rio Ave	1–0	Braga	Vila do Conde
18:00	Tarantini 42', (yellow card) 90'; Geraldes (yellow card) 89'	Report	Bruno Viana (yellow card) 38'; Marcelo Goiano (yellow card) 66'; R. Horta (yellow card) 90'; Silva (yellow card) 90+2'	Stadium: Estádio dos Arcos; Attendance: 7,452; Referee: Rui Costa

=== Taça de Portugal ===
14 October 2017 Last 64	São Martinho	2 - 3	Braga	Aves
18:00	Luther King 52'; D. Alves 56'	Summary	Sousa 11', 39'; Martins 53'	Stadium: Estádio do CD Aves; Referee: Manuel Oliveira

18 November 2017 Last 32	Rio Ave	1 - 0	Braga	Vila do Conde
20:30	Cássio (yellow card) 10'; Guedes 36', (yellow card) 45' (yellow-red card) 90'; Pelé (yellow card) 42'	Report	Esgaio (yellow card) 64'; Silva (yellow card) 64'	Stadium: Estádio dos Arcos; Referee: Tiago Martins

=== Taça da Liga ===
3 September 2017 Round 2	Boavista	1 - 2	Braga	Porto
19:00	Santos 11'; Acevedo (yellow card) 35'; Branco (yellow card) 73'	Report	Danilo (yellow card) 18'; Martins 32'; Paulinho 80'	Stadium: Estádio do Bessa; Attendance: 4,185; Referee: Rui Oliveira

==== Group A ====
Pos	Team	Pld	W	D	L	GF	GA	GD	Pts	Qualification
1	Vitória de Setúbal	3	2	1	0	6	4	+2	7	Advanced to knockout phase
2	Benfica	3	0	3	0	5	5	0	3	
3	Braga	3	0	2	1	4	5	−1	2	
4	Portimonense	3	0	2	1	5	6	−1	2	

Source: LPFP
Rules for classification: Tiebreakers

20 September 2017 Match 1	Benfica	1–1	Braga	Lisbon
21:15	Jiménez 11'; Samaris (yellow card) 90+5'	Report	Teixeira (yellow card) 53'; Ferreira 68'; Paulinho (yellow card) 90+5'	Stadium: Estádio da Luz; Attendance: 24,160; Referee: Bruno Esteves

22 December 2017 Match 2	Vitória de Setúbal	2–1	Braga	Setúbal
20:30	Paciência 32', 50' (pen.), (yellow card) 84'; Pedrosa (yellow card) 87'; Trigueira (yellow card) 90+7'	Report	Marcelo Goiano (yellow card) 10'; Costinha 45+2' (o.g.); Martins (yellow card) 47'; Xadas (yellow card) 54'; Vukčević (yellow card) 64'; Silva (yellow card) 89'; A. Horta (yellow card) 90+7'	Stadium: Estádio do Bonfim; Attendance: 1,495; Referee: Fábio Veríssimo

29 December 2017 Match 3	Braga	2–2	Portimonense	Braga
16:00	Eduardo 6'; Bruno Viana 31'	Report	Dener 39', 79'	Stadium: Estádio Municipal de Braga; Attendance: 2,994; Referee: Manuel Mota

=== UEFA Europa League ===
==== Qualifying stages ====
===== Third qualifying round =====
27 July 2017 First leg	AIK (Sweden)	1–1	(Portugal) Braga	Solna
18:00	Sundgren 18' (pen.)	Report	Silva 11'; Rosić (yellow card) 25'; Santos (yellow card) 59'	Stadium: Friends Arena; Attendance: 12,456; Referee: Marius Avram (Romania)

3 August 2017 Second leg	Braga (Portugal)	2–1 (a.e.t.) (3–2 agg.)	(Sweden) AIK	Braga
21:00	Fonte 74'; Silva (yellow card) 112', (goal) 120+1'; Matheus (yellow card) 120+3'	Report	Obasi 13'; Ishizaki (yellow card) 73'; Johansson (yellow card) 120+1'; Olsson (yellow card) 120+3'	Stadium: Estádio Municipal de Braga; Attendance: 13,851; Referee: Frank Schneider (France)

===== Play-off round =====
17 August 2017 First leg	FH (Iceland)	1–2	(Portugal) Braga	Hafnarfjörður
18:45	Ólafsson (yellow card) 15'; Viðarsson (yellow card) 28'; Björnsson 39'; Pálsson (yellow card) 82'	Report	Vukčević (yellow card) 58'; Paulinho 62'; Stojiljković 79'; Fransérgio (yellow card) 90'; Jefferson (yellow card) 90+4'	Stadium: Kaplakriki; Attendance: 1,432; Referee: Kevin Blom (Netherlands)

24 August 2017 Second leg	Braga (Portugal)	3–2 (5–3 agg.)	(Iceland) FH	Braga
19:45	Paulinho 39', 80'; Rosić (yellow card) 85'; Silva (yellow card) 86'; Sousa 90+3'	Report	Böðvarsson 16', 51', (yellow card) 79'; Doumbia (yellow card) 42'; Viðarsson (yellow card) 60'	Stadium: Estádio Municipal de Braga; Attendance: 10,937; Referee: Paweł Gil (Poland)

==== Group stage ====
Pos	Team	Pld	W	D	L	GF	GA	GD	Pts	Qualification	BRA	LUD	IBS	HOF
1	(Portugal) Braga	6	3	1	2	9	8	+1	10	Advance to knockout phase	—	0–2	2–1	3–1
2	(Bulgaria) Ludogorets Razgrad	6	2	3	1	7	5	+2	9	Advance to knockout phase	1–1	—	1–2	2–1
3	(Turkey) İstanbul Başakşehir	6	2	2	2	7	8	−1	8		2–1	0–0	—	1–1
4	(Germany) TSG Hoffenheim	6	1	2	3	8	10	−2	5		1–2	1–1	3–1	—

Source: UEFA
Rules for classification: Group stage tiebreakers

14 September 2017 1	1899 Hoffenheim (Germany)	1–2	(Portugal) Braga	Sinsheim
19:00	Wagner 24'; Nordtveit (yellow card) 42'; Demirbay (yellow card) 89'	Report	Teixeira 45+1'; Sousa 50'; Silva (yellow card) 87'	Stadium: WIRSOL Rhein-Neckar-Arena; Attendance: 15,714; Referee: Bobby Madden (Scotland)

28 September 2017 2	Braga (Portugal)	2–1	(Turkey) İstanbul Başakşehir	Braga
20:05	Marcelo Goiano (yellow card) 24'; Kouka 26'; Silva (yellow card) 27'; Fransérgio 89'	Report	Belözoğlu 28'; Costa (yellow card) 32'	Stadium: Estádio Municipal de Braga; Attendance: 10,376; Referee: Matej Jug (Slovenia)

19 October 2017 3	Braga (Portugal)	0–2	(Bulgaria) Ludogorets Razgrad	Braga
20:05	Ferreira (yellow card) 45'; Esgaio (yellow card) 49'; Paulinho (yellow card) 86'	Report	Moți 25'; Natanael (yellow card) 47'; Silva 56' (o.g.)	Stadium: Estádio Municipal de Braga; Attendance: 8,623; Referee: Davide Massa (Italy)

2 November 2017 4	Ludogorets Razgrad (Bulgaria)	1–1	(Portugal) Braga	Razgrad
18:00	Marcelinho 68'; Cicinho (yellow card) 77'	Report	Marcelo Goiano (yellow card) 32'; Xadas (yellow card) 49'; Ferreira (yellow card) 80'; Fransérgio (yellow card) 82', (goal) 83'	Stadium: Ludogorets Arena; Attendance: 7,544; Referee: Vladislav Bezborodov (Russia)

23 November 2017 Match 5	Braga (Portugal)	3–1	(Germany) Hoffenheim	Braga
20:05	Marcelo Goiano 1', (yellow card) 83'; Teixeira (yellow card) 75'; Esgaio (yellow card) 80'; Fransérgio 81', 90+3'; Kouka (yellow card) 90+6'; Ferreira (yellow card) 90+7'	Report	Grillitsch (yellow card) 62'; Demirbay (yellow card) 69'; Uth 74', (yellow card) 89'; Amiri (yellow card) 79'; Szalai (yellow card) 85' (red card) 90+7'; Schulz (yellow card) 90+6'	Stadium: Estádio Municipal de Braga; Attendance: 10,054; Referee: Andre Marriner (England)

7 December 2017 6	İstanbul Başakşehir (Turkey)	2–1	(Portugal) Braga	Istanbul
18:00	Višća 10'; Belözoğlu 77' (pen.), (yellow card) 89'	Report	Silva (yellow card) 45', (goal) 55'; Jefferson (yellow card) 66'; Vukčević (yellow card) 73'	Stadium: Fatih Terim Stadium; Referee: John Beaton (Scotland)

==== Knockout stage ====
===== Round of 32 =====
15 February 2018 First leg	Marseille (France)	3–0	(Portugal) Braga	Marseille, France
19:00 CET (UTC+01:00)	Germain 4', 69'; Amavi (yellow card) 13'; Thauvin 74'	Report	Vukčević (yellow card) 74'	Stadium: Stade Vélodrome; Attendance: 21,731; Referee: Serdar Gözübüyük (Netherlands)

22 February 2018 Second leg	Braga (Portugal)	1–0 (1–3 agg.)	(France) Marseille	Braga, Portugal
20:05 WET (UTC+00:00)	Kouka (yellow card) 18'; R. Horta 31'; Paulinho (yellow card) 65'; Esgaio (yellow card) 74'	Report	Lopez (yellow card) 33'	Stadium: Estádio Municipal; Attendance: 9,016; Referee: Svein Oddvar Moen (Norway)
