= 2018–19 S.C. Braga season =

Braga
2018–19 season
- President: António Salvador
- Manager: Abel Ferreira
- Stadium: Estádio Municipal de Braga
- Primeira Liga: 4th
- Taça de Portugal: Semi-finals
- Taça da Liga: Semi-finals
- UEFA Europa League: Third qualifying round
- Top goalscorer: League: Dyego Sousa (15); All: Dyego Sousa (20)
Home colours	Away colours	Third colours

During the 2018–19 S.C. Braga season, the club competed in the Primeira Liga, Taça de Portugal, Taça da Liga and UEFA Europa League.

== Players ==
=== First-team squad ===
As of 1 September 2018

Note: Flags indicate national team as defined under FIFA eligibility rules; some limited exceptions apply. Players may hold more than one non-FIFA nationality.

No.	Pos.	Nation	Player
1	GK	BRA	Matheus
2	DF	POR	Diogo Figueiras
4	DF	BRA	Lucas Cunha
5	DF	POR	Nuno Sequeira
6	DF	BRA	Ailton
7	FW	ANG	Wilson Eduardo
8	MF	BRA	Ricardo Ryller
10	MF	POR	Xadas
11	MF	BRA	Eduardo Teixeira
12	GK	POR	Tiago Sá
14	DF	BRA	Pablo Renan
17	MF	POR	João Novais
19	FW	BRA	Murilo
20	FW	POR	Paulinho

No.	Pos.	Nation	Player
21	MF	POR	Ricardo Horta
24	DF	POR	Ricardo Ferreira
25	MF	BRA	Claudemir
26	FW	POR	Fábio Martins
27	MF	BRA	Fransérgio
28	GK	POR	Marafona
34	DF	BRA	Raul Silva
36	DF	BRA	Bruno Viana
47	DF	POR	Ricardo Esgaio
60	MF	POR	João Palhinha
77	FW	POR	Francisco Trincão
87	DF	BRA	Marcelo Goiano (Captain)
99	FW	POR	Dyego Sousa
—	FW	BRA	Crislan
—	GK	POR	Eduardo

== Competitions ==
=== Primeira Liga ===
==== League table ====
Pos	Team	Pld	W	D	L	GF	GA	GD	Pts	Qualification or relegation
2	Porto	34	27	4	3	74	20	+54	85	Qualification for the Champions League third qualifying round
3	Sporting CP	34	23	5	6	72	33	+39	74	Qualification for the Europa League group stage (Note: Since the winners of the 2018–19 Taça de Portugal, Sporting CP, qualified for European competition based on league position, the spot awarded to the third-placed team (Europa League third qualifying round) was passed to the fourth-placed team, and the spot awarded to the fourth-placed team (Europa League second qualifying round) was passed to the fifth-placed team.)
4	Braga	34	21	4	9	56	37	+19	67	Qualification for the Europa League third qualifying round
5	Vitória de Guimarães	34	15	7	12	46	34	+12	52 (Note: Vitória de Guimarães finished ahead of Moreirense on head-to-head points: Vitória de Guimarães 1–0 Moreirense, Moreirense 1–3 Vitória de Guimarães.)	Qualification for the Europa League second qualifying round
6	Moreirense	34	16	4	14	39	44	−5	52	

Source: Liga Portugal
Rules for classification: 1) Points; 2) Head-to-head points; 3) Head-to-head goal difference; 4) Head-to-head away goals scored; 5) Goal difference; 6) Matches won; 7) Goals scored; 8) Play-off.

=== Taça de Portugal ===
21 October 2018 Third round	Felgueiras 1932	0–1	Braga	Felgueiras
20:00			Sousa 86'	Stadium: Estádio Municipal Dr. Machado Matos; Referee: Fábio Veríssimo

25 November 2018 Fourth round	Braga	2–1	Praiense	Braga
19:30	Novais 47'; Paulinho 89'	Report	João Peixoto 29' (pen.)	Stadium: Estádio Municipal de Braga; Referee: João Pinto

18 December 2018 Fifth round	Vitória de Setúbal	0–1 (a.e.t.)	Braga	Setúbal
19:00		Report	Pablo 94'	Stadium: Estádio do Bonfim; Referee: Luís Godinho

15 January 2019 Quarter-finals	Desportivo das Aves	1–2	Braga	Vila das Aves
18:00	Falcão 70'	Report	Eduardo 11', 40'	Stadium: Estádio do CD Aves; Referee: Tiago Martins

26 February 2019 Semi-finals 1st leg	Porto	3–0	Braga	Porto
20:15	Telles 37' (pen.); Soares 64'; Brahimi 90+4'	Report		Stadium: Estádio do Dragão; Referee: João Pinheiro

2 April 2019 Semi-finals 2nd leg	Braga	1–1 (1–4 agg.)	Porto	Braga
20:15	Paulinho 41'	Report	D. Pereira 71'	Stadium: Estádio Municipal de Braga; Referee: Manuel Mota

=== Taça da Liga ===
==== Group stage ====
Pos	Team	Pld	W	D	L	GF	GA	GD	Pts	Qualification	BRA	TON	VSE	NAC
1	Braga	3	3	0	0	11	1	+10	9	Advanced to knockout phase	—	2–1	—	5–0
2	Tondela	3	2	0	1	5	4	+1	6		—	—	—	2–1
3	Vitória de Setúbal	3	0	1	2	4	9	−5	1		0–4	1–2	—	—
4	Nacional	3	0	1	2	4	10	−6	1		—	—	3–3	—

Source: Liga Portugal
Rules for classification: Tiebreakers

15 September 2018 1	Braga	2–1	Tondela	Braga
20:30 WEST (UTC+01:00)	Sousa 57' (pen.); Martins 78'	Report	Xavier 8'	Stadium: Estádio Municipal de Braga; Attendance: 7,704; Referee: João Capela

30 October 2018 2	Braga	5–0	Nacional	Braga
20:15 WET (UTC±00:00)	Sousa 5', 41'; Sequeira 21'; Paulinho 43', 46'	Report		Stadium: Estádio Municipal de Braga; Attendance: 5,753; Referee: António Nobre

28 December 2018 3	Vitória de Setúbal	0–4	Braga	Setúbal
19:00 WET (UTC±00:00)		Report	Paulinho 53', 59'; Eduardo 75'; Pablo 88'	Stadium: Estádio do Bonfim; Attendance: 1,474; Referee: António Nobre

==== Semi-final ====
23 January 2019	Braga	1–1 (3–4 p)	Sporting CP	Estádio Municipal de Braga, Braga
19:45 WET (UTC±00:00)	Sousa 3'	Report	Coates 37'	Attendance: 10,087; Referee: Manuel Oliveira
	Penalties
	R. Horta (penalty missed); Paulinho (penalty missed); Murilo (penalty missed); Marcelo Goiano (penalty scored); Sousa (penalty scored); Claudemir (penalty scored); Ricardo Ryller (penalty missed)		(penalty missed) Dost; (penalty missed) Coates; (penalty scored) B. Fernandes; (penalty missed) Nani; (penalty scored) Raphinha; (penalty scored) Ristovski; (penalty scored) Jefferson

=== UEFA Europa League ===
9 August 2018 Third qualifying round 1st leg	Zorya Luhansk (Ukraine)	1–1	(Portugal) Braga	Slavutych-Arena, Zaporizhia (Note: Zorya Luhansk played their home matches at Slavutych-Arena, Zaporizhia, instead of their regular stadium Avanhard Stadium, Luhansk, due to the war conditions in Eastern Ukraine.)
20:30 (21:30 EEST)	Karavayev 72'	Report	Horta 69'	Attendance: 5,365; Referee: Tobias Welz (Germany)

16 August 2018 Third qualifying round 2nd leg	Braga (Portugal)	2–2 (3–3 agg.)	(Ukraine) Zorya Luhansk	Estádio Municipal, Braga
21:30 (20:30 WEST)	João Novais 65'; Horta 73'	Report	Ratão 70'; Karavayev 83'	Attendance: 12,224; Referee: Aleksandar Stavrev (Macedonia)

== Statistics ==
=== Goalscorers ===
As of 17 May 2019

Rank	No.	Pos	Nat	Name	Primeira Liga	Taça de Portugal	Taça da Liga	Europa League	Total
1	99	FW	(Portugal)	Dyego Sousa	15	1	4	0	20
2	7	FW	(Angola)	Wilson Eduardo	13	2	1	0	16
3	21	MF	(Portugal)	Ricardo Horta	9	0	0	2	11
4	11	FW	(Portugal)	Paulinho	4	2	4	0	10
5	14	DF	(Brazil)	Pablo	2	1	1	0	4
6	17	MF	(Portugal)	João Novais	1	1	0	1	3
6	19	FW	(Brazil)	Murilo Costa	3	0	0	0	3
8	25	MF	(Brazil)	Claudemir	2	0	0	0	2
8	27	MF	(Brazil)	Fransérgio	2	0	0	0	2
10	5	DF	(Portugal)	Nuno Sequeira	0	0	1	0	1
10	10	MF	(Portugal)	Xadas	1	0	0	0	1
10	26	MF	(Portugal)	Fábio Martins	0	0	1	0	1
10	34	DF	(Brazil)	Raul Silva	1	0	0	0	1
10	60	MF	(Portugal)	João Palhinha	1	0	0	0	1
10	87	DF	(Brazil)	Marcelo Goiano	1	0	0	0	1
Totals					55	7	12	3	77
