= 2014–15 Sporting CP season =

Sporting CP
2014–15 season
- President: Bruno de Carvalho
- Manager: Marco Silva
- Stadium: Estádio José Alvalade
- Primeira Liga: 3rd
- Taça de Portugal: Winners
- Taça da Liga: Third round
- UEFA Champions League: Group stage
- UEFA Europa League: Round of 32
- Top goalscorer: League: Islam Slimani (12); All: Fredy Montero; Islam Slimani (15 goals each)
- Highest home attendance: 49,076 vs Benfica (8 February 2015)
- Lowest home attendance: 9,035 vs Boavista (14 January 2015)
Home colours	Away colours	Third colours

This article shows Sporting CP's player statistics and all matches that the club plays during the 2014–15 season.

== Pre-season and friendlies ==
Win Draw Loss

18 July 2014 Taça de Honra Semi-final	Belenenses (Portugal)	1–2	(Portugal) Sporting CP	Lisbon
21:30	Geraldes 86' (o.g.)		Eduardo 28'; A. Martins 32'	Stadium: Estádio do Restelo

20 July 2014 Taça de Honra Final	Benfica (Portugal)	0–1	(Portugal) Sporting CP	Lisbon
20:30			A. Martins 42'	Stadium: Estádio do Restelo

23 July 2014 Friendly	Achilles '29 (Netherlands)	2–5	(Portugal) Sporting CP
19:30	Boean 38'; Van Steen 77'		Mané 3'; Tanaka 18', 61', 73'; Héldon 56'

26 July 2014 Friendly	Utrecht (Netherlands)	0–3	(Portugal) Sporting CP
18:00			A. Martins 20'; Cédric 35'; Tanaka 75'

28 July 2014 Friendly	Twente (Netherlands)	2–0	(Portugal) Sporting CP
19:00	Castaignos 5'; Promes 90'

== Competitions ==
=== Overall record ===
As of match played 31 May 2015

Performance by competition
Competition	Starting round	Current position/round	Final position/round	First match
Primeira Liga	—	3rd	16 August 2014	23 May 2015
Taça de Portugal	Third round	Winners	19 October 2014	31 May 2015
Taça da Liga	Third round	Third round (2nd)	29 December 2014	28 January 2014
UEFA Champions League	Group stage	Group stage (3rd)	17 September 2014	10 December 2014
UEFA Europa League	Round of 32	Round of 32	19 February 2015	26 February 2015

Statistics by competition
Competition	Pld	W	D	L	GF	GA	GD	Win%
Primeira Liga	34	22	10	2	67	29	+38	64.71
Taça de Portugal	7	5	2	0	20	7	+13	71.43
Taça da Liga	4	2	1	1	6	4	+2	50.00
UEFA Champions League	6	2	1	3	12	12	+0	33.33
UEFA Europa League	2	0	1	1	0	2	−2	0.00
Total	53	31	15	7	105	54	+51	58.49

=== Primeira Liga ===
==== League table ====
Pos	Team	Pld	W	D	L	GF	GA	GD	Pts	Qualification or relegation
1	Benfica (C)	34	27	4	3	86	16	+70	85	Qualification for the Champions League group stage
2	Porto	34	25	7	2	74	13	+61	82	Qualification for the Champions League group stage
3	Sporting CP	34	22	10	2	67	29	+38	76	Qualification for the Champions League play-off round
4	Braga	34	17	7	10	55	28	+27	58	Qualification for the Europa League group stage (Note: Since Sporting CP won the 2014–15 Taça de Portugal, the spot awarded to the cup winner (Europa League group stage) was passed to the fourth-placed team and the spot originally meant for the fourth-placed team (Europa League third qualifying round) was given to the sixth-placed team.)
5	Vitória de Guimarães	34	15	10	9	50	35	+15	55	Qualification for the Europa League third qualifying round

Source: LPFP
Rules for classification: 1) points; 2) points in matches between tied teams; 3) goal difference in matches between tied teams; 4) away goals in matches between tied teams; 5) goal difference; 6) wins; 7) goals scored. The LPFP decided that only criteria 1, 5, 6 and 7 would be applied to establish the classification during the competition. Qualification for the 2015–16 Europa League has changed: the best-placed non-qualified domestic championship club will enter the UEFA Europa League from the 2015–16 season, rather than the domestic cup runners-up, should the domestic cup winners also qualify for the UEFA Champions League via the final championship standings.
(C) Champions

==== Results by round ====
Round	1	2	3	4	5	6	7	8	9	10	11	12	13	14	15	16	17	18	19	20	21	22	23	24	25	26	27	28	29	30	31	32	33	34
Ground	A	H	A	H	A	H	A	H	A	H	H	A	H	A	H	A	H	H	A	H	A	H	A	H	A	H	A	A	H	A	H	A	H	A
Result	D	W	D	D	W	D	W	W	L	D	W	W	D	W	W	W	W	W	W	D	D	W	L	W	W	W	D	W	W	W	W	D	W	W
Position	11	7	8	8	6	6	4	4	6	8	6	4	5	5	4	3	3	3	3	3	3	3	3	3	3	3	3	3	3	3	3	3	3	3

Updated to match(es) played on 23 May 2015. Source: LPFP
A = Away; H = Home; W = Win; D = Draw; L = Loss

==== Matches ====
16 August 2014 1	Académica	1–1	Sporting CP	Coimbra
20:30	Lopes 90+1'	Report	Carrillo 15'	Stadium: Estádio Cidade de Coimbra; Attendance: 19,029; Referee: Artur Soares Dias

23 August 2014 2	Sporting CP	1–0	Arouca	Lisbon
20:30	Mané 90+4'	Report		Stadium: Estádio José Alvalade; Attendance: 37,752; Referee: Nuno Almeida

31 August 2014 3	Benfica	1–1	Sporting CP	Lisbon
19:00	Gaitán 12'	Report	Slimani 20'	Stadium: Estádio da Luz; Attendance: 61,895; Referee: Pedro Proença

13 September 2014 4	Sporting CP	1–1	Belenenses	Lisbon
20:15	Carrillo 35'	Report	Deyverson 28'	Stadium: Estádio José Alvalade; Attendance: 34,980; Referee: Cosme Machado

21 September 2014 5	Gil Vicente	0–4	Sporting CP	Barcelos
18:00		Report	A. Silva 9'; Nani 10'; Slimani 69'; Carrillo 84'	Stadium: Estádio Cidade de Barcelos; Attendance: 6,085; Referee: Carlos Xistra

26 September 2014 6	Sporting CP	1–1	Porto	Lisbon
20:30	J. Silva 2'	Report	Sarr 56' (o.g.)	Stadium: Estádio José Alvalade; Attendance: 37,999; Referee: Olegário Benquerença

4 October 2014 7	Penafiel	0–4	Sporting CP	Penafiel
20:15		Report	Slimani 69', 71'; Montero 82'; Nani 85'	Stadium: Estádio Municipal 25 de Abril; Attendance: 5,200; Referee: Rui Costa

26 October 2014 8	Sporting CP	4–2	Marítimo	Lisbon
18:00	Bauer 8' (o.g.); João Mário 15'; Oliveira 42'; Montero 66'	Report	Maâzou 50', 54'	Stadium: Estádio José Alvalade; Attendance: 37,578; Referee: Manuel Oliveira

1 November 2014 9	Vitória de Guimarães	3–0	Sporting CP	Guimarães
18:00	Saré 15'; Maurício 42' (o.g.); André 82' (pen.)	Report		Stadium: Estádio D. Afonso Henriques; Attendance: 25,108; Referee: Hugo Miguel

9 November 2014 10	Sporting CP	1–1	Paços de Ferreira	Lisbon
18:00	Montero 66'	Report	Hurtado 31'	Stadium: Estádio José Alvalade; Attendance: 28,456; Referee: Bruno Esteves

29 November 2014 11	Sporting CP	3–0	Vitória de Setúbal	Lisbon
20:15	Slimani 62', 90+3'; Montero 63'	Report		Stadium: Estádio José Alvalade; Attendance: 34,009; Referee: Artur Soares Dias

5 December 2014 12	Boavista	1–3	Sporting CP	Porto
20:30	J. Silva 87' (o.g.)	Report	Carrillo 54'; Mané 56'; João Mário 81'	Stadium: Estádio do Bessa; Attendance: 7,663; Referee: Jorge Sousa

14 December 2014 13	Sporting CP	1–1	Moreirense	Lisbon
18:00	Montero 90+2'	Report	Cardozo 35'	Stadium: Estádio José Alvalade; Attendance: 29,619; Referee: Jorge Ferreira

21 December 2014 14	Nacional	0–1	Sporting CP	Funchal
19:15		Report	Mané 51'	Stadium: Estádio da Madeira; Attendance: 3,632; Referee: Duarte Gomes

3 January 2015 15	Sporting CP	3–0	Estoril	Lisbon
18:00	A. Silva 20', 85' (pen.); Slimani 57'	Report		Stadium: Estádio José Alvalade; Attendance: 32,793; Referee: Vasco Santos

11 January 2015 16	Braga	0–1	Sporting CP	Braga
19:15		Report	Tanaka 90+3'	Stadium: Estádio Municipal de Braga; Attendance: 15,876; Referee: Hugo Miguel

18 January 2015 17	Sporting CP	4–2	Rio Ave	Lisbon
20:15	Nani 30'; Montero 60'; João Mário 67'; Tanaka 90'	Report	Del Valle 38'; Hassan 68'	Stadium: Estádio José Alvalade; Attendance: 27,919; Referee: Nuno Almeida

25 January 2015 18	Sporting CP	1–0	Académica	Lisbon
16:00	João Mário 76'	Report		Stadium: Estádio José Alvalade; Attendance: 37,769; Referee: Rui Costa

1 February 2015 19	Arouca	1–3	Sporting CP	Arouca
18:00	Simão 26' (pen.)	Report	Montero 31'; Carrillo 63'; Figueiredo 77'	Stadium: Estádio Municipal de Arouca; Attendance: 2,112; Referee: Jorge Ferreira

8 February 2015 20	Sporting CP	1–1	Benfica	Lisbon
20:00	Jefferson 88'	Report	Jardel 90+4'	Stadium: Estádio José Alvalade; Attendance: 49,076; Referee: Jorge Sousa

14 February 2015 21	Belenenses	1–1	Sporting CP	Lisbon
20:15	Fonte 69'	Report	Mané 90+4'	Stadium: Estádio do Restelo; Attendance: 4,426; Referee: Paulo Baptista

22 February 2015 22	Sporting CP	2–0	Gil Vicente	Lisbon
18:15	Tanaka 51'; Nani 69'	Report		Stadium: Estádio José Alvalade; Attendance: 42,098; Referee: Jorge Tavares

1 March 2015 23	Porto	3–0	Sporting CP	Porto
19:15	Tello 31', 58', 82'	Report		Stadium: Estádio do Dragão; Attendance: 43,111; Referee: Artur Soares Dias

9 March 2015 24	Sporting CP	3–2	Penafiel	Lisbon
20:00	Carvalho 5'; Slimani 8'; Nani 70'	Report	Braga 12'; Vítor Bruno 42'	Stadium: Estádio José Alvalade; Attendance: 25,495; Referee: Bruno Esteves

15 March 2015 25	Marítimo	0–1	Sporting CP	Funchal
17:00		Report	A. Silva 32' (pen.)	Stadium: Estádio dos Barreiros; Attendance: 6,892; Referee: Rui Costa

22 March 2015 26	Sporting CP	4–1	Vitória de Guimarães	Lisbon
18:00	João Mário 13'; A. Silva 33' (pen.); Slimani 44'; Nani 75' (pen.)	Report	Kanu 82'	Stadium: Estádio José Alvalade; Attendance: 35,979; Referee: Jorge Sousa

4 April 2015 27	Paços de Ferreira	1–1	Sporting CP	Paços de Ferreira
20:15	Galo 75'	Report	Slimani 30'	Stadium: Estádio da Mata Real; Attendance: 4,597; Referee: Cosme Machado

12 April 2015 28	Vitória de Setúbal	1–2	Sporting CP	Setúbal
19:15	Suk 47'	Report	Mané 38'; Tanaka 44'	Stadium: Estádio do Bonfim; Attendance: 6,839; Referee: Olegário Benquerença

19 April 2015 29	Sporting CP	2–1	Boavista	Lisbon
18:00	A. Silva 1'; Slimani 65'	Report	Zé Manuel 7'	Stadium: Estádio José Alvalade; Attendance: 35,197; Referee: Luís Ferreira

27 April 2015 30	Moreirense	1–4	Sporting CP	Moreira de Cónegos
20:00	Leandro 44'	Report	Mané 2'; Montero 34', 85'; Tanaka 36'	Stadium: Parque de Jogos Comendador Joaquim de Almeida Freitas; Attendance: 2,554; Referee: Vasco Santos

2 May 2015 31	Sporting CP	2–0	Nacional	Lisbon
20:15	Montero 56', 90+3'	Report		Stadium: Estádio José Alvalade; Attendance: 31,169; Referee: Cosme Machado

10 May 2015 32	Estoril	1–1	Sporting CP	Estoril
17:00	Sebá 25'	Report	Ewerton 55'	Stadium: Estádio António Coimbra da Mota; Attendance: 4,102; Referee: Duarte Gomes

17 May 2015 33	Sporting CP	4–1	Braga	Lisbon
18:00	A. Silva 45+1' (pen.), 74'; Figueiredo 52'; Slimani 90+4'	Report	Pardo 13' (pen.)	Stadium: Estádio José Alvalade; Attendance: 36,912; Referee: Carlos Xistra

23 May 2015 34	Rio Ave	0–1	Sporting CP	Vila do Conde
18:00		Report	Nani 48'	Stadium: Estádio do Rio Ave FC; Attendance: 3,747; Referee: Bruno Esteves

=== Taça de Portugal ===
==== Third round ====
19 October 2014	Porto	1–3	Sporting CP	Porto
17:00	Martínez 35'		Marcano 31' (o.g.); Nani 39'; Carrillo 83'	Stadium: Estádio do Dragão; Attendance: 36,869; Referee: Jorge Sousa

==== Fourth round ====
21 November 2014	Sporting de Espinho	0–5	Sporting CP	Santa Maria da Feira
20:30			João Mário 32'; Capel 61'; Montero 68', 81'; Tanaka 77' (pen.)	Stadium: Estádio Marcolino de Castro; Referee: Vasco Santos

==== Fifth round ====
17 December 2014	Vizela	2–3	Sporting CP	Moreira de Cónegos
20:00	Talocha 37', 45+3'		A. Martins 34' (pen.); Oliveira 39'; Mané 59'	Stadium: Parque de Jogos Comendador Joaquim de Almeida Freitas; Attendance: 4,000; Referee: Nuno Almeida

==== Quarter-finals ====
7 January 2015	Sporting CP	4–0	Famalicão	Lisbon
21:00	Carrillo 34'; João Mário 48'; Oliveira 69'; Montero 75'			Stadium: Estádio José Alvalade; Attendance: 11,683; Referee: Tiago Martins

==== Semi-finals ====
5 March 2015 1st leg	Nacional	2–2	Sporting CP	Funchal
20:15	L. Aurélio 50'; João 59'		Figueiredo 55'; Mané 83'	Stadium: Estádio da Madeira; Attendance: 2,500; Referee: Carlos Xistra

8 April 2015 2nd leg	Sporting CP	1–0 (3–2 agg.)	Nacional	Lisbon
20:00	Ewerton 85'			Stadium: Estádio José Alvalade; Attendance: 16,315; Referee: Hugo Miguel

==== Final ====
31 May 2015	Sporting CP	2–2 (a.e.t.) (3–1 p)	Braga	Oeiras
17:15	Slimani 84'; Montero 90+3'		Eder 16'; R. Silva 25'	Stadium: Estádio Nacional; Attendance: 35,890; Referee: Marco Ferreira
	Penalties
	A. Silva (penalty scored); Nani (penalty scored); Slimani (penalty scored)		(penalty scored) Alan; (penalty missed) Pinto; (penalty missed) Eder; (penalty missed) Agra

=== Taça da Liga ===
==== Third round ====
Pos	Team	Pld	W	D	L	GF	GA	GD	Pts	Qualification
1	Vitória de Setúbal	4	2	2	0	8	3	+5	8	Advances to knockout phase
2	Sporting CP	4	2	1	1	6	4	+2	7	
3	Belenenses	4	1	2	1	5	6	−1	5	
4	Vitória de Guimarães	4	1	1	2	4	6	−2	4	
5	Boavista	4	0	2	2	2	6	−4	2	

Source: LPFP
Rules for classification: Tiebreakers

29 December 2014 1	Vitória de Guimarães	0–2	Sporting CP	Guimarães
20:45		Report	Héldon 5'; Dramé 90+4'	Stadium: Estádio D. Afonso Henriques; Attendance: 7,844; Referee: Manuel Oliveira

14 January 2015 2	Sporting CP	1–0	Boavista	Lisbon
19:15	Tanaka 74' (pen.)	Report		Stadium: Estádio José Alvalade; Attendance: 9,035; Referee: Luís Ferreira

21 January 2015 3	Belenenses	3–2	Sporting CP	Lisbon
19:15	Camará 38', 61' (pen.); Dálcio 55'	Report	Gauld 6', 19'	Stadium: Estádio do Restelo; Attendance: 2,243; Referee: Rui Rodrigues

28 January 2015 4	Sporting CP	1–1	Vitória de Setúbal	Lisbon
19:45	Santos 13' (o.g.)	Report	Lourenço 54'	Stadium: Estádio José Alvalade; Attendance: 9,084; Referee: Manuel Mota

=== UEFA Champions League ===
==== Group stage ====
Pos	Team	Pld	W	D	L	GF	GA	GD	Pts	Qualification	CHE	SCH	SPO	MRB
1	(England) Chelsea	6	4	2	0	17	3	+14	14	Advance to knockout phase	—	1–1	3–1	6–0
2	(Germany) Schalke 04	6	2	2	2	9	14	−5	8	Advance to knockout phase	0–5	—	4–3	1–1
3	(Portugal) Sporting CP	6	2	1	3	12	12	0	7	Transfer to Europa League	0–1	4–2	—	3–1
4	(Slovenia) Maribor	6	0	3	3	4	13	−9	3		1–1	0–1	1–1	—

Source: UEFA
Rules for classification: Group stage tiebreakers

17 September 2014 1	Maribor (Slovenia)	1–1	(Portugal) Sporting CP	Maribor
20:45 CEST (UTC+02:00)	Zahović 90+2'	Report	Nani 80'	Stadium: Ljudski vrt Attendance: 12,211; Referee: Clément Turpin (France)

30 September 2014 2	Sporting CP (Portugal)	0–1	(England) Chelsea	Lisbon
20:45 CEST (UTC+02:00)		Report	Matić 34'	Stadium: Estádio José Alvalade; Attendance: 40,734; Referee: Antonio Mateu Lahoz (Spain)

21 October 2014 3	Schalke 04 (Germany)	4–3	(Portugal) Sporting CP	Gelsenkirchen
20:45 CEST (UTC+02:00)	Obasi 34'; Huntelaar 51'; Höwedes 60'; Choupo-Moting 90+3' (pen.)	Report	Nani 16'; A. Silva 64' (pen.), 78'	Stadium: Veltins-Arena; Attendance: 49,943; Referee: Sergei Karasev (Russia)

5 November 2014 4	Sporting CP (Portugal)	4–2	(Germany) Schalke 04	Lisbon
20:45 CET (UTC+01:00)	Sarr 26'; Jefferson 52'; Nani 72'; Slimani 90+1'	Report	Slimani 17' (o.g.); Aogo 88'	Stadium: Estádio José Alvalade; Attendance: 35,473; Referee: Paolo Tagliavento (Italy)

25 November 2014 5	Sporting CP (Portugal)	3–1	(Slovenia) Maribor	Lisbon
20:45 CET (UTC+01:00)	Mané 10'; Nani 35'; Slimani 65'	Report	Jefferson 42' (o.g.)	Stadium: Estádio José Alvalade; Attendance: 32,739; Referee: Craig Thomson (Scotland)

10 December 2014 6	Chelsea (England)	3–1	(Portugal) Sporting CP	London
20:45 CET (UTC+01:00)	Fàbregas 8' (pen.); Schürrle 16'; Mikel 56'	Report	J. Silva 50'	Stadium: Stamford Bridge; Attendance: 41,089; Referee: Svein Oddvar Moen (Norway)

=== UEFA Europa League ===
==== Round of 32 ====
19 February 2015 1st leg	VfL Wolfsburg (Germany)	2–0	(Portugal) Sporting CP	Wolfsburg
19:00 CET (UTC+01:00)	Dost 46', 63'	Report		Stadium: Volkswagen Arena; Attendance: 19,207; Referee: Alon Yefet (Israel)

26 February 2015 2nd leg	Sporting CP (Portugal)	0–0 (0–2 agg.)	(Germany) VfL Wolfsburg	Lisbon
21:05 CET (UTC+01:00)		Report		Stadium: Estádio José Alvalade; Attendance: 23,097; Referee: Ruddy Buquet (France)

== Squad statistics ==
As of match played 2 May 2015

Pos.	No.	Name	Primeira Liga		Taça de Portugal		Taça da Liga		Champions League		Europa League		Discipline		
Pos.	No.	Name	Apps	Goals	Apps	Goals	Apps	Goals	Apps	Goals	Apps	Goals	Yellow card	Yellow-Red card	Red card
GK	1	(Portugal) Rui Patrício	31 (0)	0	3 (0)	0	0 (0)	0	6 (0)	0	2 (0)	0	3	0	0
DF	2	(Egypt) Ramy Rabia	0 (0)	0	0 (0)	0	2 (1)	0	0 (0)	0	0 (0)	0	1	0	0
DF	3	(Brazil) Maurício	14 (0)	0	2 (0)	0	0 (0)	0	5 (0)	0	0 (0)	0	7	1	0
DF	4	(Brazil) Jefferson	22 (0)	1	2 (0)	0	0 (0)	0	3 (0)	1	1 (0)	0	8	1	0
DF	5	(Brazil) Ewerton	6 (1)	0	1 (0)	1	0 (0)	0	0 (0)	0	0 (0)	0	0	1	0
FW	7	(Egypt) Shikabala	0 (0)	0	0 (0)	0	0 (0)	0	0 (0)	0	0 (0)	0	0	0	0
MF	8	(Portugal) André Martins	11 (5)	0	3 (1)	1	1 (0)	0	1 (2)	0	0 (1)	0	1	0	0
FW	9	(Algeria) Islam Slimani	15 (4)	11	1 (3)	0	0 (0)	0	6 (0)	2	0 (1)	0	4	0	0
FW	10	(Colombia) Fredy Montero	15 (7)	11	4 (0)	3	0 (0)	0	0 (5)	0	1 (1)	0	4	0	0
FW	11	(Spain) Diego Capel	2 (17)	0	2 (0)	1	0 (0)	0	1 (3)	0	0 (0)	0	0	0	0
DF	13	(Portugal) Miguel Lopes	6 (2)	0	4 (0)	0	2 (0)	0	0 (0)	0	0 (0)	0	5	1	0
MF	14	(Portugal) William Carvalho	26 (2)	1	4 (0)	0	0 (0)	0	6 (0)	0	1 (0)	0	12	1	0
MF	17	(Portugal) João Mário	20 (7)	5	6 (0)	2	0 (0)	0	5 (1)	0	2 (0)	0	8	0	0
FW	18	(Peru) André Carrillo	24 (6)	5	4 (1)	2	0 (0)	0	4 (2)	0	2 (0)	0	3	0	0
FW	19	(Japan) Junya Tanaka	5 (10)	5	2 (3)	1	4 (0)	1	0 (0)	0	1 (1)	0	1	0	0
FW	20	(Cape Verde) Héldon	1 (1)	0	0 (1)	0	1 (0)	1	0 (0)	0	0 (0)	0	1	0	0
GK	22	(Brazil) Marcelo Boeck	0 (0)	0	3 (0)	0	4 (0)	0	0 (0)	0	0 (0)	0	1	0	0
MF	23	(Portugal) Adrien Silva	25 (3)	6	2 (1)	0	0 (0)	0	6 (0)	2	2 (0)	0	13	1	0
MF	24	(Spain) Oriol Rosell	5 (7)	0	2 (2)	0	4 (0)	0	0 (1)	0	1 (0)	0	2	1	0
FW	25	(France) Hadi Sacko	0 (0)	0	0 (0)	0	0 (4)	0	0 (0)	0	0 (0)	0	1	0	0
DF	26	(Portugal) Paulo Oliveira	24 (1)	1	5 (0)	2	0 (0)	0	4 (1)	0	2 (0)	0	7	1	0
MF	27	(Scotland) Ryan Gauld	0 (2)	0	0 (0)	0	3 (0)	2	0 (0)	0	0 (0)	0	0	0	0
DF	29	(France) Naby Sarr	8 (0)	0	2 (0)	0	4 (0)	0	3 (1)	1	0 (0)	0	2	0	0
MF	32	(Bulgaria) Simeon Slavchev	0 (0)	0	0 (0)	0	2 (0)	0	0 (0)	0	0 (0)	0	0	0	0
DF	33	(Argentina) Jonathan Silva	9 (0)	1	4 (0)	0	1 (0)	0	3 (0)	1	1 (0)	0	6	1	0
FW	34	(Chile) Diego Rubio	0 (0)	0	0 (0)	0	0 (1)	0	0 (0)	0	0 (0)	0	0	0	0
FW	36	(Portugal) Carlos Mané	11 (15)	6	4 (1)	2	0 (0)	0	2 (2)	1	0 (2)	0	3	0	0
FW	38	(Portugal) Cristian Ponde	0 (0)	0	0 (0)	0	0 (1)	0	0 (0)	0	0 (0)	0	1	0	0
DF	41	(Portugal) Cédric	22 (0)	0	2 (1)	0	0 (0)	0	5 (0)	0	2 (0)	0	10	1	0
MF	42	(Brazil) Wallyson Mallmann	0 (0)	0	0 (0)	0	2 (2)	0	0 (0)	0	0 (0)	0	2	0	0
DF	47	(Portugal) Ricardo Esgaio	3 (0)	0	0 (2)	0	4 (0)	0	1 (0)	0	0 (0)	0	3	0	0
DF	55	(Portugal) Tobias Figueiredo	10 (2)	1	2 (0)	1	2 (0)	0	0 (0)	0	2 (0)	0	2	0	2
FW	56	(Portugal) Daniel Podence	0 (0)	0	0 (2)	0	4 (0)	0	0 (0)	0	0 (0)	0	2	0	0
FW	60	(Portugal) Gelson Martins	0 (0)	0	0 (0)	0	0 (2)	0	0 (0)	0	0 (0)	0	0	0	0
FW	77	(Portugal) Nani	25 (0)	6	2 (0)	1	0 (0)	0	5 (0)	4	2 (0)	0	11	1	0
DF	81	(Portugal) André Geraldes	0 (0)	0	0 (0)	0	4 (0)	0	0 (0)	0	0 (0)	0	0	0	0
FW	93	(France) Ousmane Dramé	0 (0)	0	0 (0)	0	0 (1)	1	0 (0)	0	0 (0)	0	0	0	0

== Players ==
=== Current squad ===
Note: Flags indicate national team as defined under FIFA eligibility rules; some limited exceptions apply. Players may hold more than one non-FIFA nationality.

No.	Pos.	Nation	Player
1	GK	POR	Rui Patrício (Captain)
4	DF	BRA	Jefferson
5	DF	BRA	Ewerton (on loan from Anzhi Makhachkala)
8	MF	POR	André Martins
9	FW	ALG	Islam Slimani
10	FW	COL	Fredy Montero
11	MF	ESP	Diego Capel
14	MF	POR	William Carvalho
17	MF	POR	João Mário
18	FW	PER	André Carrillo
19	FW	JPN	Junya Tanaka
20	FW	CPV	Héldon
22	GK	BRA	Marcelo Boeck

No.	Pos.	Nation	Player
23	MF	POR	Adrien Silva
24	MF	ESP	Oriol Rosell
26	DF	POR	Paulo Oliveira
27	MF	SCO	Ryan Gauld
29	DF	FRA	Naby Sarr
32	MF	BUL	Simeon Slavchev
33	DF	ARG	Jonathan Silva
36	FW	POR	Carlos Mané
41	DF	POR	Cédric
55	DF	POR	Tobias Figueiredo
77	FW	POR	Nani (on loan from Manchester United)
81	DF	POR	André Geraldes

== Transfers ==
=== In ===
Note: Flags indicate national team as defined under FIFA eligibility rules; some limited exceptions apply. Players may hold more than one non-FIFA nationality.

No.	Pos.	Nation	Player
—	MF	BUL	Simeon Slavchev (from Litex Lovech) €2,500,000
—	DF	POR	Paulo Oliveira (from Vitória de Guimarães) €2,000,000
—	DF	ESP	Oriol Rosell (from Sporting Kansas City) €1,000,000
—	FW	POR	Gazela (from Padroense) €500,000
—	DF	POR	André Geraldes (from Belenenses) €1,000,000
—	DF	BRA	Jefferson (from Sporting CP) €300,000 (20%)
—	FW	JPN	Tanaka (from Kashiwa Reysol) €750,000
—	MF	SCO	Ryan Gauld (from Dundee United) €3,800,000
—	DF	FRA	Naby Sarr (from Lyon) €1,000,000
—	DF	EGY	Ramy Rabia (from Al Ahly) €750,000 (85%)
—	DF	ARG	Jonathan Silva (from Estudiantes La Plata) €2,900,000
—	FW	POR	Nani (from Manchester United) Loan
—	FW	FRA	Hadi Sacko (from Bordeaux) €1,400,000
—	DF	BRA	Ewerton (from Anzhi Makhachkala) Loan, €300,000

Total expending: ▼€18,200,000

=== Out ===
Note: Flags indicate national team as defined under FIFA eligibility rules; some limited exceptions apply. Players may hold more than one non-FIFA nationality.

No.	Pos.	Nation	Player
—	MF	BRA	Renato Neto (to Gent) End of contract
—	DF	BRA	Weldinho (to Palmeiras) End of loan
—	MF	BRA	Gérson Magrão End of contract
—	DF	PAR	Iván Piris (to Deportivo Maldonado) End of loan
—	DF	BRA	Evaldo (to Gil Vicente) Free transfer
—	GK	BRA	Victor Golas (to Braga) Free transfer
—	MF	ARG	Fabián Rinaudo (to Catania) €1,000,000 (35%)
—	FW	POR	Wilson Eduardo (to Dinamo Zagreb) Loan
—	FW	POR	Diogo Salomão (to Deportivo La Coruña) Loan
—	MF	GNB	Zézinho (to AEL Limassol) Loan
—	FW	ARG	Valentín Viola (to Karabükspor) Loan
—	DF	PAR	Matías Rodrigo Pérez (to Club Nacional) End of loan
—	DF	ENG	Eric Dier (to Tottenham Hotspur) €5,000,000
—	DF	ARG	Marcos Rojo (to Manchester United) €5,000,000 (25%)
—	MF	POR	Vítor (to Reus) Free Transfer
—	DF	POR	Rúben Semedo (to Reus) Loan
—	GK	POR	Mickaël Meira (to AEL Limassol) Free transfer
—	DF	BRA	Maurício (to Lazio) Loan

Total income: ▲€11,000,000
