= Ricardo Ryller =

Brazilian footballer

Ricardo
Personal information
- Full name: Ricardo Ryller Ribeiro Lino Silva
- Date of birth: 27 February 1994 (age 32)
- Place of birth: Tangará da Serra, Brazil
- Height: 1.82 m (6 ft 0 in)
- Position: Midfielder

Team information
- Current team: Vitória
- Number: 28

Youth career
- Mixto
- Luverdense

Senior career*
| Years | Team | Apps | (Gls) |
| 2014–2018 | Luverdense | 90 | (5) |
| 2018–2021 | Braga | 12 | (0) |
| 2018–2021 | Braga B | 13 | (3) |
| 2019–2021 | → Red Bull Bragantino (loan) | 7 | (0) |
| 2021–2024 | Al-Fayha | 66 | (2) |
| 2024– | Vitória | 45 | (0) |
- * Club domestic league appearances and goals as of 13 December 2025

Ricardo Ryller Ribeiro Lino Silva (born 27 February 1994) is a Brazilian professional footballer who plays as a midfielder for Vitória.

== Club career ==
=== Luverdense ===
Born in Tangará da Serra, Mato Grosso, Ryller represented Mixto and Luverdense as a youth. Promoted to the latter's first team for the 2014 campaign, he made his senior debut on 22 January of that year, coming on as a substitute for Júlio Terceiro in a 1–0 Campeonato Mato-Grossense home win against CEOV.

Ryller established himself as a regular at Luverdense from the 2015 season onwards, and extended his contract until December 2017 in May. He scored his first senior goal on 29 July, in a 1–2 away loss against Boa Esporte for the Série B championship.

On 28 December 2016, the club rejected an offer from Coritiba to secure Ryller's services. In the 2017 campaign, he contributed with eight goals in 44 appearances overall, and also helped the club to win the 2017 Copa Verde.

=== Braga ===
Amidst interest from Vasco da Gama, Ryller moved abroad and signed with Portuguese club Braga on 16 January 2018, after agreeing to a deal which would keep him in the club until 2022. He made his Primeira Liga debut on 10 February 2018, replacing Paulinho in a 3–1 home win against Vitória de Setúbal. However, he spent the remainder of the campaign playing for the reserve team in LigaPro.

Ryller returned to the main squad for the 2018–19 season, but was mainly used as a substitute.

==== Red Bull Bragantino (loan) ====
On 19 June 2019, Ryller returned to his home country after being loaned to second division side Red Bull Bragantino for one year. He scored three goals in 17 appearances during the 2019 Série B, helping in their promotion to the Série A as champions.

On 24 June 2020, Ryller's loan was extended for a further year. He made his debut in the top tier of Brazilian football on 9 August, starting in a 1–1 away draw against Santos.

=== Al-Fayha ===
On 3 August 2021, Ryller joined Saudi Arabian club Al-Fayha. On 19 May 2022, he won the 2022 King Cup Final with Al-Fayha against Al Hilal.

=== Vitória ===
On 1 July 2024, Ryller joined Vitória on a free transfer.

== Career statistics ==
As of 17 May 2021

| Club | Season | League | | | State League | | Cup | | Continental | | Other | | Total | |
| Club | Season | Division | Apps | Goals | Apps | Goals | Apps | Goals | Apps | Goals | Apps | Goals | Apps | Goals |
|---|---|---|---|---|---|---|---|---|---|---|---|---|---|---|
| Luverdense | 2014 | Série B | 3 | 0 | 1 | 0 | — | | — | | — | | 4 | 0 |
| Luverdense | 2015 | Série B | 26 | 1 | 8 | 0 | 4 | 0 | — | | 6 (Note: Three appearances in Copa Verde, three appearances in Copa FMF) | 0 | 44 | 1 |
| Luverdense | 2016 | Série B | 36 | 1 | 5 | 1 | — | | — | | — | | 41 | 2 |
| Luverdense | 2017 | Série B | 25 | 3 | 7 | 0 | 4 | 2 | — | | 8 (Note: Appearance(s) in Copa Verde) | 3 | 44 | 8 |
| Luverdense | Total | | 90 | 5 | 21 | 1 | 8 | 2 | — | | 11 | 3 | 140 | 11 |
| Braga B | 2017–18 | LigaPro | 12 | 3 | — | | — | | — | | — | | 12 | 3 |
| Braga B | 2018–19 | LigaPro | 1 | 0 | — | | — | | — | | — | | 1 | 0 |
| Braga B | Total | | 13 | 3 | — | | — | | — | | — | | 13 | 3 |
| Braga | 2017–18 | Primeira Liga | 1 | 0 | — | | — | | — | | — | | 1 | 0 |
| Braga | 2018–19 | Primeira Liga | 11 | 0 | — | | 3 | 0 | 2 (Note: Appearance(s) in UEFA Europa League) | 0 | 2 (Note: Appearance(s) in Taça da Liga) | 0 | 18 | 0 |
| Braga | Total | | 12 | 0 | — | | 3 | 0 | 2 | 0 | 2 | 0 | 19 | 0 |
| Red Bull Bragantino (loan) | 2019 | Série B | 17 | 3 | — | | — | | — | | — | | 17 | 3 |
| Red Bull Bragantino (loan) | 2020 | Série A | 29 | 2 | 5 | 0 | 2 | 0 | — | | — | | 36 | 2 |
| Red Bull Bragantino (loan) | 2021 | Série A | 0 | 0 | 10 | 0 | 1 | 0 | 2 (Note: Appearance(s) in Copa Sudamericana) | 0 | — | | 13 | 0 |
| Red Bull Bragantino (loan) | Total | | 46 | 5 | 15 | 0 | 3 | 0 | 2 | 0 | — | | 66 | 5 |
| Career total | | | 161 | 13 | 36 | 1 | 14 | 2 | 4 | 0 | 13 | 3 | 238 | 19 |

== Honours ==
Luverdense

- Campeonato Mato-Grossense: 2016
- Copa Verde: 2017

Red Bull Bragantino

- Campeonato Brasileiro Série B: 2019

Al-Fayha

- King Cup: 2021–22
