= Wilson Eduardo =

Angolan footballer

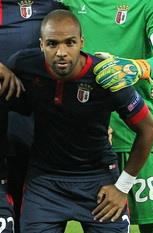
- Eduardo with Braga in 2016

Personal information
- Full name: Wilson Bruno Naval da Costa Eduardo
- Date of birth: 8 July 1990 (age 36)
- Place of birth: Pedras Rubras, Portugal
- Height: 1.79 m (5 ft 10 in)
- Position: Forward

Youth career
- 1999–2000: GD Vilar
- 2000–2004: Porto
- 2004–2009: Sporting CP

Senior career*
Years	Team	Apps	(Gls)
2009–2015	Sporting CP	20	(3)
2009	→ Real Massamá (loan)	13	(1)
2010	→ Portimonense (loan)	10	(3)
2010–2011	→ Beira-Mar (loan)	27	(5)
2011–2012	→ Olhanense (loan)	27	(7)
2012–2013	→ Académica (loan)	25	(6)
2014	Sporting CP B	1	(1)
2014–2015	→ Dinamo Zagreb (loan)	10	(1)
2015	→ Den Haag (loan)	14	(2)
2015–2020	Braga	98	(30)
2020–2021	Al Ain	18	(3)
2021–2023	Alanyaspor	38	(8)
2023–2024	APOEL	13	(2)
2024–2025	Alverca	17	(3)
2025–2026	Belenenses	27	(6)

International career
2005–2006	Portugal U16	12	(7)
2006–2007	Portugal U17	12	(7)
2008–2009	Portugal U19	20	(6)
2009	Portugal U20	3	(0)
2010–2012	Portugal U21	14	(6)
2019	Angola	6	(2)
- * Club domestic league appearances and goals as of 08:26, 3 September 2026 (UTC)

Wilson Bruno Naval da Costa Eduardo (born 8 July 1990) is a professional footballer who plays as a forward.

He was developed at Sporting CP, but spent most of his time out on loan. In 2015 he joined Braga, with whom he won the 2015–16 Taça de Portugal and the 2019–20 Taça da Liga. Over nine seasons in the Primeira Liga, where he represented those two clubs and three others, he amassed totals of 197 matches and 51 goals. He also played in the Netherlands, Croatia, the United Arab Emirates, Turkey and Cyprus.

Eduardo played for Portugal at youth level. He switched his allegiance to Angola in 2019, appearing at the year's Africa Cup of Nations.

== Club career ==
=== Sporting CP ===
Eduardo was born in Pedras Rubras, Maia. After starting his football grooming with local FC Porto he finished it at Sporting CP, joining the latter's youth system at the age of 14. In 2009–10 he made his senior debut, splitting the season between Real SC (third division) and Portimonense SC (second) and being a relatively important part as the Algarve side returned to the Primeira Liga after a 20-year absence.

In the 2010–11 campaign, still on loan, Eduardo joined S.C. Beira-Mar, also recently promoted from the second level. He made his competition debut on 15 August 2010, coming from the bench in a 0–0 home draw against U.D. Leiria. Two weeks later, as the Aveiro team defeated Académica de Coimbra 2–1 (also at home), he scored his first goal in the top flight.

Eduardo was again loaned by Sporting for 2012–13, to Académica. On 8 November 2012 he netted twice – one of his goals coming through a second-half penalty – in the 2–0 home win against Atlético Madrid in the group stage of the UEFA Europa League.

On 18 August 2013, Eduardo finally made his Sporting debut, in the first game of the new season, starting and scoring in a 5–1 home victory over F.C. Arouca. On 6 April 2014 he dropped into the reserves who competed in division two, scoring the decider in a 2–1 away defeat of C.D. Feirense.

Eduardo moved abroad for the first time on 20 July, being loaned to Croatian Football League champions GNK Dinamo Zagreb, and made 17 overall appearances for the capital team, scoring in the 2–0 win over NK Istra 1961 on 13 September. On 30 January 2015, he switched to assist ADO Den Haag for the remainder of the Eredivisie campaign.

=== Braga ===
Eduardo ended his 11-year association with Sporting on 31 August 2015, moving to Paulo Fonseca's S.C. Braga. He made his debut 17 days later in a Europa League group match away to FC Slovan Liberec, replacing Crislan for the final 28 minutes of a 1–0 victory, and contributed two goals in ten games as they reached the quarter-finals as well as one in three in a victorious run in the Taça de Portugal. His only league goal of the season came on 10 January 2016 to open a 2–3 loss on his return to the Estádio José Alvalade.

In 2018–19, Eduardo reached double figures for the first time in a league campaign, scoring 13 times while partnered with Dyego Sousa up front. On 6 October 2018, he was one of five people – including three non-playing members of staff – sent off in the closing stages of a 1–1 home draw against Rio Ave FC, being issued a straight red card after the final whistle and on his way to the changing room.

=== Later career ===
On 16 July 2020, Eduardo signed a two-year contract with Al Ain FC of the UAE Pro League. He scored on his league debut on 17 October, concluding a 2–0 home win over Khor Fakkan Club having earlier missed a penalty.

Eduardo moved to Alanyaspor of the Turkish Süper Lig on 16 August 2021, on a two-year deal with the option of a third; he joined compatriots José Marafona and Daniel Candeias at the club. He scored four times in his first season, starting with a goal in a 6–0 rout of Hatayspor on 20 January 2022.

On 22 June 2023, Eduardo signed for APOEL FC of the Cypriot First Division, under his former Braga manager Ricardo Sá Pinto. He won the league in his only season, then returned to Portugal with second-tier side F.C. Alverca.

On 1 July 2025, Eduardo joined C.F. Os Belenenses of Liga 3 on a one-year contract.

== International career ==
All youth levels comprised, Eduardo earned 61 caps for Portugal and scored 26 goals. In 2013, he rejected to play for the Angola senior team.

Eduardo went back on his decision in 2019, scoring on his debut against Botswana in a 1–0 away victory for the 2019 Africa Cup of Nations qualifiers on 22 March. He was called up by manager Srđan Vasiljević for the tournament in Egypt, and played all three games of a group-stage exit.

== Personal life ==
Eduardo's younger brother, João Mário, is also a footballer. A midfielder, he too graduated from Sporting's youth academy.

== Career statistics ==
=== Club ===
As of 19 June 2023

Appearances and goals by club, season and competition
Club	Season	League		National cup		League cup		Continental		Other (Note: Includes Supertaça Cândido de Oliveira)		Total	
Club	Season	Apps	Goals	Apps	Goals	Apps	Goals	Apps	Goals	Apps	Goals	Apps	Goals
Sporting CP	2008–09	0	0	0	0	0	0	0	0	—		0	0
Sporting CP	2013–14	20	3	2	1	2	1	—		—		24	5
Sporting CP	Total	20	3	2	1	2	1	0	0	—		24	5
Real (loan)	2009–10	13	1	2	1	—		—		—		15	2
Portimonense (loan)	2009–10	10	3	—		—		—		—		10	3
Beira-Mar (loan)	2010–11	27	5	2	0	3	0	—		—		32	5
Olhanense (loan)	2011–12	27	7	3	0	0	0	—		—		30	7
Académica (loan)	2012–13	25	6	3	1	3	1	6	3	—		37	11
Sporting CP B	2013–14	1	1	—		—		—		—		1	1
Dinamo Zagreb (loan)	2014–15	10	1	1	0	—		6	0	—		17	1
Den Haag (loan)	2014–15	14	2	—		—		—		—		14	2
Braga	2015–16	14	1	4	2	3	1	10	2	—		31	6
Braga	2016–17	18	6	3	1	2	0	6	1	1	0	30	8
Braga	2017–18	16	7	0	0	1	1	4	0	—		21	8
Braga	2018–19	32	13	5	2	3	1	2	0	—		42	16
Braga	2019–20	18	3	3	2	1	1	7	2	—		29	8
Braga	Total	98	30	15	7	10	4	29	5	1	0	153	46
Al Ain	2019–20	—		—		—		2	0	—		2	0
Al Ain	2020–21	18	3	0	0	1	0	—		—		19	3
Al Ain	Total	18	3	0	0	1	0	2	0	—		21	3
Alanyaspor	2021–22	22	4	4	2	—		—		—		26	6
Alanyaspor	2022–23	16	4	2	0	—		—		—		18	4
Alanyaspor	Total	38	8	6	2	—		—		—		44	10
Career total		294	65	34	12	19	4	43	8	1	0	391	89

=== International ===
Scores and results list Angola's goal tally first, score column indicates score after each Eduardo goal.

List of international goals scored by Eduardo
No.	Date	Venue	Opponent	Score	Result	Competition
1	22 March 2019	Francistown Stadium, Francistown, Botswana	Botswana	1–0	1–0	2019 Africa Cup of Nations qualification
2	13 November 2019	Estádio 11 de Novembro, Luanda, Angola	Gambia	1–0	1–3	2021 Africa Cup of Nations qualification

== Honours ==
Dinamo Zagreb

- Croatian Football League: 2014–15
- Croatian Football Cup: 2014–15

Braga

- Taça de Portugal: 2015–16
- Taça da Liga: 2019–20

APOEL

- Cypriot First Division: 2023–24
