= Xadas =

Portuguese footballer

Personal information
- Full name: Bruno Alexandre Vieira Almeida
- Date of birth: 2 December 1997 (age 28)
- Place of birth: Oliveira de Azeméis, Portugal
- Height: 1.79 m (5 ft 10 in)
- Position: Attacking midfielder

Team information
- Current team: Tianjin Jinmen Tiger
- Number: 8

Youth career
- 2005–2008: Milheiroense
- 2008–2010: Porto
- 2010–2014: Sanjoanense
- 2014–2016: Braga

Senior career*
Years	Team	Apps	(Gls)
2016–2017	Braga B	34	(11)
2017–2021	Braga	34	(3)
2020	→ Marítimo (loan)	12	(1)
2020–2021	→ Mouscron (loan)	25	(2)
2021–2024	Marítimo	90	(11)
2024–	Tianjin Jinmen Tiger	71	(18)

International career
2016	Portugal U19	8	(1)
2016–2017	Portugal U20	12	(4)
2017–2018	Portugal U21	6	(1)
- * Club domestic league appearances and goals as of 14:30, 8 November 2026 (UTC)

Bruno Alexandre Vieira Almeida (born 2 December 1997), known as Xadas [ˈʃaðɐʃ], is a Portuguese professional footballer who plays as an attacking midfielder for Chinese Super League club Tianjin Jinmen Tiger.

== Club career ==
=== Braga ===
Born in Oliveira de Azeméis, Porto metropolitan area, Xadas inherited his unusual nickname through his father and grandfather. He passed through the ranks of FC Porto and A.D. Sanjoanense before arriving at S.C. Braga in 2014. He made his professional debut for the latter club's reserves in the LigaPro on 2 April 2016 in a 2–1 away loss against S.C. Freamunde, playing the final 30 minutes as a substitute for Pedro Alves and receiving a yellow card in added time.

In 2016–17, Xadas scored 11 goals in 30 matches for the B team, including both on 28 September 2016 as they came from behind to draw 2–2 at home to C.D. Aves. The following 1 April, he was called up for the first team for their match against C.S. Marítimo; he made his Primeira Liga debut in this game the following day, playing the final four minutes in place of Artur Jorge in a 3–3 draw at the Estádio Municipal de Braga, and had three more appearances over the remainder of the season.

After the dismissal of manager Jorge Simão, Xadas became a regular starter under successor Abel Ferreira, who knew him from the reserve side. He scored a first top-flight goal on 13 August 2017, to equalise in a 2–1 win at home over Portimonense SC.

=== Marítimo ===
On 31 January 2020, Xadas was loaned to Marítimo until the end of the campaign. He scored once during his time in Madeira, the game's only on 3 July away to C.D. Santa Clara, from a free kick.

Xadas went on loan to Royal Excel Mouscron of the Belgian Pro League in October 2020. At its conclusion, he signed a three-year deal at Marítimo, with Braga retaining 60% of his economic rights. In one of his first games back on 22 August 2021, he scored with the outside of his boot from distance to earn a 1–1 draw at home to Porto.

=== Later career ===
On 23 June 2024, Xadas joined Chinese Super League club Tianjin Jinmen Tiger F.C. on a one-and-a-half-year contract.

== International career ==
At the 2017 FIFA U-20 World Cup in South Korea, Xadas played all five games of a quarter-final run for Portugal. He scored twice in a 3–1 win over the hosts in the last 16 at Cheonan Stadium.

== Career statistics ==
As of match played 8 November 2026

Appearances and goals by club, season and competition
Season	Club	League			Cup		League Cup		Continental		Other		Total	
Season	Club	Division	Apps	Goals	Apps	Goals	Apps	Goals	Apps	Goals	Apps	Goals	Apps	Goals
Braga B	2015–16	LigaPro	4	0	—		—		—		—		4	0
Braga B	2016–17	LigaPro	30	11	—		—		—		—		34	11
Braga B	Total		34	11	—		—		—		—		34	11
Braga	2016–17	Primeira Liga	4	0	0	0	0	0	0	0	—		4	0
Braga	2017–18	Primeira Liga	21	2	1	0	3	0	9	0	—		34	2
Braga	2018–19	Primeira Liga	8	1	1	0	0	0	1	0	—		10	1
Braga	2019–20	Primeira Liga	1	0	0	0	1	0	1	0	—		3	0
Braga	Total		34	3	2	0	4	0	11	0	—		51	3
Marítimo (loan)	2019–20	Primeira Liga	12	1	—		—		—		—		12	1
Mouscron (loan)	2020–21	Belgian Pro League	25	2	0	0	—		—		—		25	2
Marítimo	2021–22	Primeira Liga	25	3	1	0	1	0	—		—		27	3
Marítimo	2022–23	Primeira Liga	32	3	1	1	3	0	—		2	1	38	5
Marítimo	2023–24	Liga Portugal 2	33	5	4	3	1	1	—		—		38	9
Marítimo	Total		90	11	6	4	5	1	—		2	1	103	17
Tianjin Jinmen Tiger	2024	Chinese Super League	12	2	2	0	—		—		—		14	2
Tianjin Jinmen Tiger	2025	Chinese Super League	29	7	1	0	—		—		—		30	7
Tianjin Jinmen Tiger	2026	Chinese Super League	30	9	0	0	—		—		—		30	9
Tianjin Jinmen Tiger	Total		71	18	3	0	—		—		—		74	18
Career Total			256	46	11	4	9	1	11	0	2	1	289	52

== Honours ==
Braga

- Taça da Liga: 2019–20
