= Bruno Viana =

Brazilian footballer (born 1995)

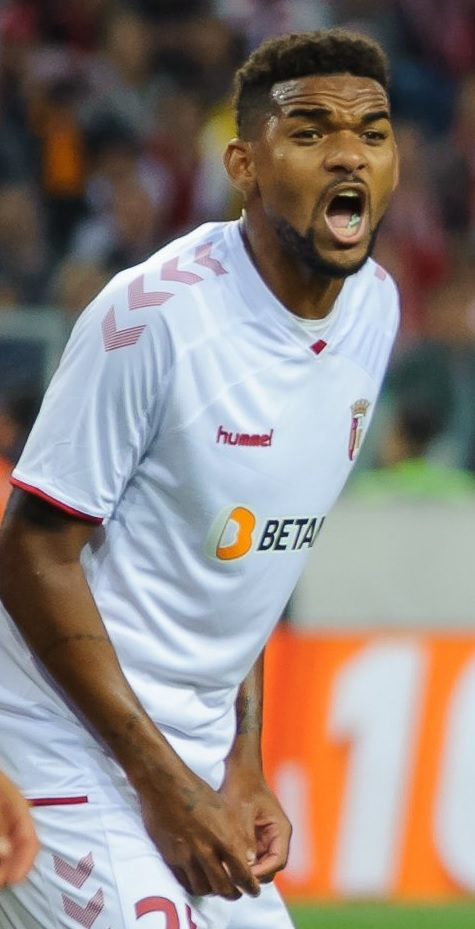
- Viana with Braga in 2019

Personal information
- Full name: Bruno Viana Willemen da Silva
- Date of birth: 5 February 1995 (age 31)
- Place of birth: Macaé, Brazil
- Height: 1.82 m (6 ft 0 in)
- Position: Centre-back

Team information
- Current team: Qingdao West Coast (on loan from Alanyaspor)
- Number: 2

Youth career
- 2012–2016: Cruzeiro

Senior career*
Years	Team	Apps	(Gls)
2016	Cruzeiro	15	(0)
2016–2018	Olympiacos	17	(1)
2017–2018	→ Braga (loan)	26	(4)
2018–2022	Braga	74	(2)
2021	→ Flamengo (loan)	20	(0)
2022	→ Khimki (loan)	2	(0)
2022	→ Wuhan Yangtze River (loan)	22	(4)
2023–2025	Coritiba	10	(0)
2023–2024	→ Al-Hazem (loan)	28	(2)
2024–2025	→ Gaziantep (loan)	28	(0)
2025–	Alanyaspor	6	(0)
2026–	→ Qingdao West Coast (loan)	8	(0)
- * Club domestic league appearances and goals as of 19 November 2026

Bruno Viana Willemen da Silva (born 5 February 1995) is a Brazilian football player who plays as a centre-back for Qingdao West Coast, on loan from Turkish club Alanyaspor.

== Career ==
=== Cruzeiro ===
On 10 March 2016, he made his professional debut with Cruzeiro in a 2–1 victory over Atlético Paranaense.

=== Olympiacos ===
On 31 August 2016, the last day of pre-season transfer window, Viana joined Olympiacos.

The transfer of Viana to Olympiacos for €2 million is remarkable among the transfers involving Cruzeiro defenders. In Brazilian currency, the transfer of Bruno Viana was the fourth largest to reach R$7.6 million due to the devaluation of the real against the euro and the US dollar.

On 5 February 2017, he scored his first goal with the club, opening the score in a 3–0 home Super League win against Iraklis. On 7 July 2017, he signed a single-season contract with Portuguese club Braga on loan from Olympiacos. On 29 October 2017, he scored his first goal with the club sealing a 1–0 home win game against Chaves.

=== Braga ===
On 1 March 2018, according to recent reports from Portugal, Braga decided to buy a talented central defender from Olympiacos. The Portuguese club will have to pay an estimated amount of €3 million in the summer of 2018, in order to secure the capture of 23-year-old Brazilian stopper, who has made 26 official performances with four goals in all competitions during the 2017–18 season. Eventually, after his impressive half session with Braga, the Brazilian defender has completed his permanent transfer to the Portuguese club. It's reported that Olympiacos will receive €3 million for the deal, while Viana is rewarded with a five-year Braga contract through to 2023.

==== Flamengo (loan) ====
On 12 February 2021, Viana joined Flamengo on a season-long loan with an option to buy.

==== Khimki (loan) ====
On 9 February 2022, Viana joined Russian Premier League club Khimki on loan until the end of the season. The loan was terminated early following the Russian invasion of Ukraine.

==== Wuhan Yangtze River ====
On 28 April 2022, Viana joined Chinese Super League club Wuhan Yangtze River.

==== Coritiba ====
On 27 January 2023, Bruno Viana joined Coritiba.

==== Al-Hazem (loan) ====
On 17 August 2023, Viana joined Saudi Pro League club Al-Hazem on loan.

==== Gaziantep F.K. (loan) ====
On 8 August 2024, Viana joined Gaziantep F.K. on loan.

==== Qingdao West Coast ====
On 27 July 2026, Viana was loaned to Chinese Super League side Qingdao West Coast for the rest of 2026 season.

== Career statistics ==
=== Club ===
As of 18 May 2024

Appearances and goals by club, season and competition
Club	Season	League			State League		National Cup		League Cup		Continental		Other		Total	
Club	Season	Division	Apps	Goals	Apps	Goals	Apps	Goals	Apps	Goals	Apps	Goals	Apps	Goals	Apps	Goals
Cruzeiro	2016	Série A	13	0	2 (Note: Appearance(s) in Campeonato Mineiro)	0	4	0	—		—		1 (Note: Appearance(s) in Primeira Liga (Brazil))	0	20	0
Olympiacos	2016–17	Superleague	17	1	—		3	0	—		3 (Note: Appearance(s) in UEFA Europa League)	0	—		23	1
Braga (loan)	2017–18	Primeira Liga	26	4	—		1	0	3	1	5	0	—		35	5
Braga	2018–19	Primeira Liga	32	0	—		6	0	4	0	2	0	—		44	0
Braga	2019–20	Primeira Liga	29	0	—		3	0	5	0	12	1	—		49	1
Braga	2020–21	Primeira Liga	13	2	—		2	0	1	0	6	0	—		22	2
Braga	Total		100	6	—		12	0	13	1	25	1	0	0	150	8
Flamengo (loan)	2021	Série A	18	0	9 (Note: Appearance(s) in Campeonato Carioca)	0	3	1	—		8 (Note: Appearance(s) in Copa Libertadores)	0	—		38	1
Khimki (loan)	2021–22	Russian Premier League	2	0	—		—		—		—		—		2	0
Wuhan Yangtze River (loan)	2022	Chinese Super League	22	4	—		0	0	—		—		—		22	4
Coritiba	2023	Série A	10	0	5 (Note: Appearance(s) in Campeonato Paranaense)	0	4	0	—		—		—		19	0
Al-Hazem (loan)	2023–24	Saudi Pro League	28	2	—		2	0	—		—		—		30	2
Career total			210	13	16	0	28	1	13	1	36	1	1	0	304	16

== Honours ==
Olympiacos

- Super League Greece: 2016–17

Flamengo

- Supercopa do Brasil: 2021
- Campeonato Carioca: 2021

Braga

- Taça de Portugal: 2020–21
- Taça da Liga: 2019–20
