= Ricardo Ferreira (soccer, born 1992) =

Footballer (born 1992)

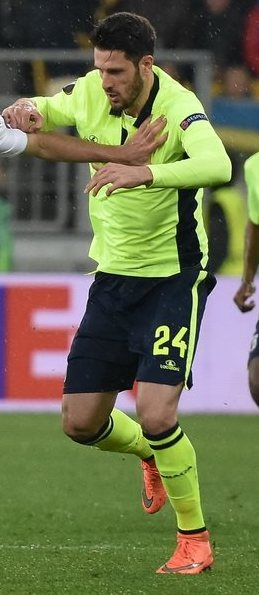
- Ferreira in action for Braga in 2016

Personal information
- Full name: Ricardo José Araújo Ferreira
- Date of birth: 25 November 1992 (age 33)
- Place of birth: Mississauga, Ontario, Canada
- Height: 1.90 m (6 ft 3 in)
- Position: Centre-back

Youth career
- Dixie SC
- Brampton Youth SC
- Toronto FC
- 2008–2011: Porto
- 2011–2012: AC Milan

Senior career*
Years	Team	Apps	(Gls)
2012–2013	AC Milan	0	(0)
2012–2013	→ Empoli (loan)	4	(0)
2013–2015	Olhanense	7	(0)
2014–2015	→ Paços Ferreira (loan)	10	(0)
2015–2019	Braga	42	(2)
2019	Braga B	1	(0)
2020	Belenenses SAD	5	(0)
2020–2021	Farense	1	(0)
Total		70	(2)

International career^{‡}
2008–2009	Portugal U17	8	(0)
2009–2010	Portugal U18	5	(0)
2010–2011	Portugal U19	7	(1)
2012	Portugal U20	1	(0)
2012	Portugal U21	1	(0)
2017	Portugal	1	(0)
2021	Canada	1	(0)
- * Club domestic league appearances and goals as of 21:56, 2 January 2021 (UTC) ‡ National team caps and goals as of 29 March 2021

Ricardo José Araújo Ferreira (born 25 November 1992) is a Canadian former professional soccer player who played as a central defender.

After finishing his youth career with Milan, he went to play for Empoli, Olhanense, Paços de Ferreira, Braga, Belenenses SAD and Farense, amassing Primeira Liga totals of 65 matches and two goals over seven seasons.

Ferreira formerly represented Portugal internationally, switching to the Canada national team in 2021.

== Club career ==
Born in Mississauga, Ontario, Canada to Portuguese parents, Ferreira started playing soccer with Canadian youth clubs Dixie SC, Brampton Youth SC, before moving to Major League Soccer club Toronto FC's TFC Academy, where he was part of the Canadian Soccer Association national training centre program and Ontario's youth select teams.

In 2008 at the age of 15, Ferreira transferred Portugal's FC Porto in the Primeira Liga. He was included in their 2010–11 UEFA Europa League squad list, but never made an official appearance for the first team.

On 8 July 2011, Ferreira signed for Serie A club A.C. Milan on a free transfer. For the 2012–13 season, he was loaned to fellow Italian side Empoli F.C. in Serie B. He made his professional debut on 25 September 2012, coming on as a substitute for Vincent Laurini in the 29th minute of an eventual 2–0 away loss against Calcio Padova.

Ferreira returned to Portugal with S.C. Olhanense of the Primeira Liga in July 2013, where he largely spent his time as a backup. The following campaign, he was loaned to F.C. Paços de Ferreira of the same division.

For 2015–16, Ferreira joined S.C. Braga on a four-year deal. He contributed nine appearances in their quarter-final run in the Europa League, scoring in the group stage against FC Slovan Liberec in a 2–1 home win, but twice scored an own goal in the 4–0 away defeat to FC Shakhtar Donetsk which finished 6–1 on aggregate. In a friendly against English club Wigan Athletic in July 2016, Ferreira suffered a knee injury that meant he missed the start of the 2016-17 season.

On 3 January 2018, during the first half of the league fixture away to Boavista F.C., Ferreira suffered another knee injury and was sidelined for the rest of the season. Exactly one year later, while appearing in a LigaPro match for S.C. Braga B team, the injury recurred. In May 2019, Braga announced his contract would not be renewed at the end of the campaign, making him a free agent.

Ferreira was without a club until 31 January 2020, when he signed a short-term deal with Belenenses SAD until the summer. He played only five matches during his spell.

Ferreira agreed to a one-year deal at newly promoted S.C. Farense on 30 September 2020, but agreed to a mutual termination to his contract in January 2021, after struggling to progress into the first team and making only one appearance.

== International career ==
=== Portugal ===
Canadian-born, Ferreira chose to represent Portugal internationally, going on to win 22 caps at youth level. His only appearance for the under-21 team came on 15 October 2012, in a 1–0 friendly loss against Ukraine.

Ferreira first appeared with the senior side on 14 November 2017, playing the full 90 minutes in a 1–1 friendly draw with the United States.

=== Canada ===
On 5 February 2021, Ferreira announced a change of national associations and became eligible to represent Canada. He received his first call-up a month later for 2022 FIFA World Cup qualifiers against Bermuda and the Cayman Islands, making his debut on 29 March in the 11–0 victory over the latter nation.

== Career statistics ==
=== Club ===
As of match played 7 December 2020

Appearances and goals by club, season and competition
Club	Season	League			National cup		League cup		Europe		Other (Note: Includes the Supertaça Cândido de Oliveira)		Total	
Club	Season	League	Apps	Goals	Apps	Goals	Apps	Goals	Apps	Goals	Apps	Goals	Apps	Goals
AC Milan	2012–13	Serie A	0	0	—		—		—		—		0	0
Empoli (loan)	2012–13	Serie B	4	0	1	0	—		—		—		5	0
Olhanense	2013–14	Primeira Liga	7	0	0	0	2	0	—		—		9	0
Paços Ferreira (loan)	2014–15	Primeira Liga	10	0	3	0	1	0	—		—		14	0
Braga	2015–16	Primeira Liga	23	1	7	0	2	0	9	1	—		41	2
Braga	2016–17	Primeira Liga	12	1	0	0	2	0	0	0	0	0	14	1
Braga	2017–18	Primeira Liga	7	0	1	0	2	1	4	0	—		14	1
Braga	2018–19	Primeira Liga	0	0	0	0	0	0	0	0	0	0	0	0
Braga	Total		42	2	8	0	6	1	13	1	0	0	69	4
Braga B	2018–19	LigaPro	1	0	—		—		—		—		1	0
Belenenses SAD	2019–20	Primeira Liga	5	0	0	0	0	0	—		—		5	0
Farense	2020–21	Primeira Liga	1	0	0	0	0	0	—		—		1	0
Career total			70	2	12	0	9	1	13	1	0	0	104	4

=== International ===
As of match played 29 March 2021

Appearances and goals by national team and year
National team	Year	Apps	Goals
Portugal	2017	1	0
Canada	2021	1	0
Total		2	0

== Honours ==
Braga

- Taça de Portugal: 2015–16
