= Matheus (footballer, born March 1992) =

Brazilian footballer

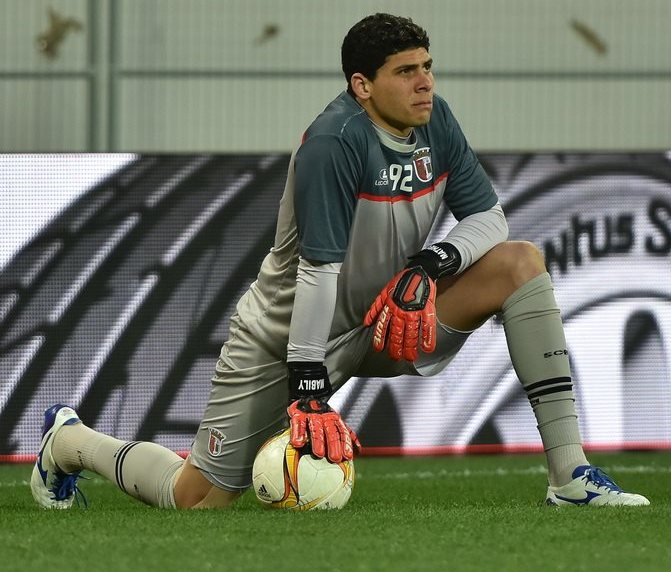
- Matheus with Braga in 2016

Personal information
- Full name: Matheus Lima Magalhães
- Date of birth: 29 March 1992 (age 34)
- Place of birth: Belo Horizonte, Brazil
- Height: 1.90 m (6 ft 3 in)
- Position: Goalkeeper

Team information
- Current team: Red Star Belgrade
- Number: 1

Youth career
- 2008–2011: América Mineiro

Senior career*
Years	Team	Apps	(Gls)
2012–2014	América Mineiro	61	(0)
2014–2025	Braga	245	(0)
2025	→ Ajax (loan)	9	(0)
2025–	Red Star Belgrade	45	(0)
- * Club domestic league appearances and goals as of 21 November 2026

Matheus Lima Magalhães (born 29 March 1992), known simply as Matheus, is a Brazilian professional footballer who plays as a goalkeeper for Serbian SuperLiga club Red Star Belgrade.

Developed at América Mineiro, he spent most of his career at Braga in Portugal, making 365 appearances and winning the Taça de Portugal and the Taça da Liga twice each.

== Club career ==
=== América Mineiro ===
Born in Belo Horizonte, Minas Gerais, Matheus joined América Futebol Clube (MG)'s youth setup in 2008, aged 13. Ahead of the 2012 season, he was promoted to the first team after impressing in the 2011 Campeonato Brasileiro Sub-20.

Matheus made his professional debut on 18 September 2012, coming on as a second-half substitute for field player Fábio Júnior as starter Neneca was sent off, in a 2–0 away loss against Clube Atlético Bragantino in the Série B. The following June, he was chosen as first choice by manager Paulo Comelli, and retained his position during the campaign.

=== Braga ===
On 4 July 2014, Matheus moved abroad and signed a five-year contract with Portuguese club S.C. Braga. He made his Primeira Liga debut on 27 September in a 3–0 home win over Rio Ave FC, and finished his first season as starter ahead of Stanislav Kritsyuk and compatriot Victor Golas after being delayed by bureaucratic problems.

Matheus lost his starting spot to José Marafona in the following campaigns, missing the Taça de Portugal final win over FC Porto in 2016 after playing the earlier rounds. He made his continental debut in that same season's UEFA Europa League, appearing in 12 games and only receiving a yellow card in the quarter-final elimination away to FC Shakhtar Donetsk on 14 April, after conceding a penalty through a foul on Viktor Kovalenko.

Matheus returned to the starting XI in 2017–18 after Marafona was injured, and on 15 March 2018 he renewed his contract until 2023. He played every minute of the campaign, in which his club finished fourth; only five other players in the league matched his feat, three of whom shared his position.

Matheus suffered a severe knee injury in late August 2018, after which Tiago Sá had a run in the team. He returned to his starting role for the 2019–20 season, playing four matches in the Taça da Liga that year, including the 1–0 victory against Porto in the final on 25 January; he featured in as many games in the 2020–21 Taça de Portugal which ended with a 2–0 defeat of S.L. Benfica.

In the following campaign's Europa League, Matheus made two saves in a penalty shootout win over FC Sheriff Tiraspol in the knockout round play-off on 24 February 2022, and days after the last-eight elimination by Rangers in April he extended his contract to 2027. On 12 August, after a 3–0 win at nearby F.C. Famalicão, he reached 250 appearances for the Minho club. He was sent off for them for the first time on 30 September for a foul on Porto's Mehdi Taremi, in an eventual 4–1 defeat.

On 15 August 2023, Matheus surpassed compatriot Alan's record of 63 games for Braga in European competition, in a 4–1 away win over Serbia's FK TSC in the third qualifying round of the UEFA Champions League. Eighteen days later, against Sporting, he made his 300th appearance and became the club's most experienced goalkeeper of all time.

In January 2025, Matheus requested to leave. The following month, he was loaned to Eredivisie side AFC Ajax until 30 June with the option for a permanent transfer afterwards. He made his debut for the club on 23 February, being named Player of the match in the 2–0 home defeat of Go Ahead Eagles in the domestic league. On 30 March, he provided an assist in a 2–0 away victory against PSV Eindhoven.

=== Red Star ===
On 25 June 2025, Matheus joined Serbian SuperLiga club Red Star Belgrade on a three-year deal, for €1.2 million. He won the double in his debut season.

== International career ==
After being naturalised as a Portuguese citizen in 2020, Matheus expressed a desire to play for their national team.

== Personal life ==
Matheus' older brother, Moisés, was also a footballer. A midfielder, he too started his career at América Mineiro.

Matheus met and married his wife in Braga and had three children with her.

== Career statistics ==
As of match played 8 November 2026

Appearances and goals by club, season and competition
Club	Season	League			State League		National cup (Note: Includes Copa do Brasil, Taça de Portugal and Serbian Cup)		League cup (Note: Includes Taça da Liga)		Continental		Other		Total	
Club	Season	Division	Apps	Goals	Apps	Goals	Apps	Goals	Apps	Goals	Apps	Goals	Apps	Goals	Apps	Goals
América Mineiro	2012	Série B	4	0	0	0	0	0	—		—		—		4	0
América Mineiro	2013	Série B	33	0	1	0	2	0	—		—		—		36	0
América Mineiro	2014	Série B	10	0	13	0	0	0	—		—		—		23	0
América Mineiro	Total		47	0	14	0	2	0	—		—		—		63	0
Braga	2014–15	Primeira Liga	23	0	—		0	0	—		—		—		23	0
Braga	2015–16	Primeira Liga	3	0	—		6	0	4	0	12 (Note: Appearances in UEFA Europa League)	0	—		25	0
Braga	2016–17	Primeira Liga	6	0	—		0	0	5	0	4	0	—		15	0
Braga	2017–18	Primeira Liga	34	0	—		1	0	2	0	12	0	—		49	0
Braga	2018–19	Primeira Liga	3	0	—		0	0	0	0	2	0	—		5	0
Braga	2019–20	Primeira Liga	29	0	—		4	0	0	0	4	0	—		37	0
Braga	2020–21	Primeira Liga	32	0	—		4	0	3	0	6	0	—		45	0
Braga	2021–22	Primeira Liga	32	0	—		1	0	0	0	11	0	1 (Note: Appearance in Supertaça Cândido de Oliveira)	0	45	0
Braga	2022–23	Primeira Liga	32	0	—		4	0	2	0	7 (Note: Six appearances in UEFA Europa League, one appearance in UEFA Conference League)	0	—		45	0
Braga	2023–24	Primeira Liga	34	0	—		0	0	2	0	10 (Note: Eight appearances in UEFA Champions League, two appearances in UEFA Europa League)	0	—		46	0
Braga	2024–25	Primeira Liga	17	0	—		1	0	2	0	10	0	—		30	0
Braga	Total		245	0	—		21	0	20	0	78	0	1	0	365	0
Ajax (loan)	2024–25	Eredivisie	9	0	—		—		—		1	0	—		10	0
Red Star Belgrade	2025–26	Serbian SuperLiga	32	0	—		2	0	—		16 (Note: Six appearances in UEFA Champions League, ten appearances in UEFA Europa League)	0	—		50	0
Red Star Belgrade	2026–27	Serbian SuperLiga	12	0	—		0	0	—		7 (Note: Four appearances in UEFA Champions League, two appearances in UEFA Europa League, one appearance in UEFA Conference League)	0	—		19	0
Red Star Belgrade	Total		44	0	—		2	0	—		23	0	—		69	0
Career total			345	0	14	0	25	0	20	0	102	0	1	0	504	0

== Honours ==
Braga

- Taça de Portugal: 2015–16, 2020–21
- Taça da Liga: 2019–20, 2023–24

Red Star

- Serbian SuperLiga: 2025–26
- Serbian Cup: 2025–26
