= André Pedrosa =

Portuguese footballer

Personal information
- Full name: André Alexandre Antunes Pedrosa
- Date of birth: 12 April 1997 (age 29)
- Place of birth: Barreiro, Portugal
- Height: 1.85 m (6 ft 1 in)
- Position: Midfielder

Team information
- Current team: Vitória Setúbal
- Number: 27

Youth career
- 2005–2006: Fabril Barreiro
- 2006–2013: Sporting
- 2013–2016: Vitória Setúbal

Senior career*
| Years | Team | Apps | (Gls) |
| 2016– | Vitória Setúbal | 20 | (0) |
- * Club domestic league appearances and goals as of 21 September 2017

André Alexandre Antunes Pedrosa (born 12 April 1997) is a Portuguese professional footballer who plays for Vitória F.C. as a midfielder.

== Club career ==
On 29 December 2016, Pedrosa made his professional debut with Vitória Setúbal in a 2016–17 Taça da Liga match against Arouca.
