= João Góis =

Portuguese footballer

Personal information
- Full name: João Duarte Teixeira Góis
- Date of birth: 5 May 1990 (age 36)
- Place of birth: Camacha, Portugal
- Height: 1.76 m (5 ft 9 1/2 in)
- Position: Right-back

Youth career
- 2000–2004: Camacha
- 2004–2009: Nacional

Senior career*
Years	Team	Apps	(Gls)
2009–2010	União Madeira	3	(0)
2010–2012	Camacha	55	(1)
2012–2013	Sertanense	29	(1)
2013–2015	Chaves	65	(1)
2015–2018	Paços Ferreira	45	(1)
2018–2020	Estoril	32	(0)
2021–2022	Felgueiras 1932	10	(0)
2022–2025	Vila Meã	47	(1)
- * Club domestic league appearances and goals as of 22:14, 29 March 2026 (UTC)

João Duarte Teixeira Góis (born 5 May 1990 in Camacha, Madeira) is a Portuguese professional footballer who plays as a right-back.
