= Dyego Sousa =

Brazilian footballer (born 1989)

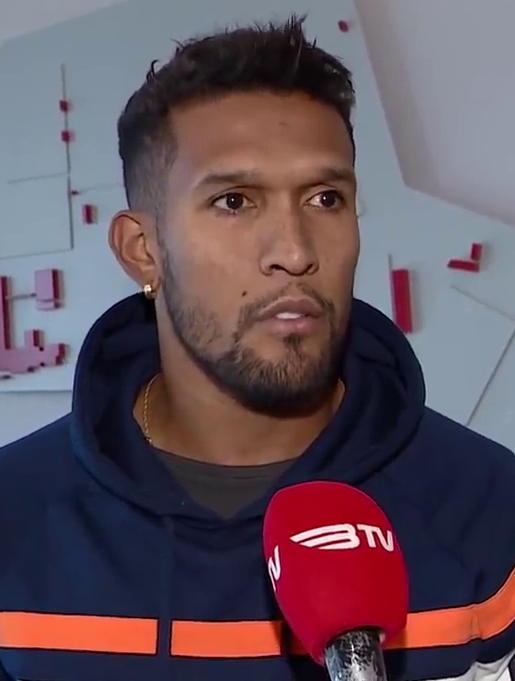
- Sousa in 2020

Personal information
- Full name: Dyego Wilverson Ferreira Sousa
- Date of birth: 14 September 1989 (age 37)
- Place of birth: São Luís, Brazil
- Height: 1.89 m (6 ft 2 in)
- Position: Striker

Youth career
- Americano-MA
- Maranhão
- Moto Club
- 2005–2007: Palmeiras
- 2007–2008: Nacional

Senior career*
Years	Team	Apps	(Gls)
2009	Moto Club	13	(4)
2010	Operário	13	(2)
2010–2011	Leixões	10	(2)
2011–2012	Interclube	0	(0)
2012–2013	Tondela	29	(4)
2013–2014	Portimonense	26	(6)
2014	Marítimo B	1	(1)
2014–2017	Marítimo	61	(19)
2017–2019	Braga	51	(23)
2019–2020	Shenzhen	10	(3)
2020	→ Benfica (loan)	11	(0)
2020	→ Famalicão (loan)	5	(0)
2021–2023	Almería	44	(5)
2023–2024	Alcorcón	24	(7)
2024–2025	Nacional	7	(0)

International career^{‡}
2019	Portugal	2	(0)
Medal record
Men's football
Representing Portugal
UEFA Nations League
Winner	2019 Portugal
- * Club domestic league appearances and goals as of 3 May 2025 ‡ National team caps and goals as of 25 March 2019

Dyego Wilverson Ferreira Sousa (born 14 September 1989) is a professional footballer who plays as a striker.

He spent most of his career in Portugal, making 128 appearances and scoring 41 goals in the Primeira Liga for Marítimo, Braga and Benfica. In the second tier, he played 66 games and scored 13 goals for four clubs.

Born and raised in Brazil, Sousa made his international debut for Portugal in 2019 and was part of their squad that won the 2018–19 UEFA Nations League.

== Club career ==
=== Early career ===
Born in São Luís, Maranhão, Sousa began his career at his hometown team Moto Club's youth setup before moving to Palmeiras in 2005, aged 15. Released by the club in the following year, he subsequently joined Nacional's under-20 squad after a trial period.

Sent back to Brazil in the middle of 2008 to nurse an injury, Sousa never returned to Nacional. In 2009, he returned to Moto Club and made his senior debut on 19 February, starting in a 2–1 Campeonato Maranhense away loss against São José; his first goal for the club came on 23 April, in a 2–2 draw against the same opponent.

On 13 November 2009, Sousa joined Operário, and made his debut for the club the following 17 January, by starting in a 1–0 home win against Cascavel CR, for the year's Campeonato Paranaense. He scored his first goal for the club on 31 March, netting his team's second in a 2–2 home draw against the same opponent, but was released in April after scoring only two goals.

=== Leixões ===
In July 2010, Sousa moved abroad for the second time, again to Portugal, joining Leixões of the Liga de Honra. He made his professional debut on 8 August, starting in a 0–0 away draw against Trofense, for the season's Taça da Liga; his first goal abroad occurred on 10 November, in a 2–1 loss at Paços de Ferreira, also for the league cup.

Sousa contributed with three goals in 14 appearances overall, as his side finished sixth.

=== Interclube ===
In June 2011, Sousa switched continents again, signing for Interclube in the Girabola of Angola. However, he failed to make a single appearance during his time at the club, as his international certificate never arrived; he subsequently terminated his contract with the club in early 2012, but still remained six months without a club.

=== Tondela / Portimonense ===
Sousa returned to Portugal's second tier in July 2012 with Tondela, being a regular starter during the campaign and scoring four times. The following year, he moved to fellow second division side Portimonense on 11 June, in a deal for two seasons.

At Portimonense, Sousa scored braces in home wins against Atlético CP (4–0) and Marítimo B (2–1), finishing his only year with seven goals overall.

=== Marítimo ===
On 13 July 2014, Sousa signed a three-year contract with Primeira Liga club Marítimo. In his first season on the island of Madeira, he scored twice, both in a 4–0 home win over Boavista on 30 November, but the following campaign he recorded 12 goals and made the top ten scorers of the year. He also started six matches in the club's Taça da Liga run, that ended on 20 May 2016 with a 6–2 loss to Benfica in the final at the Estádio Cidade de Coimbra.

In August 2016, in a friendly against Tondela, Sousa attacked a linesman, and was given a nine-month ban by the Portuguese Football Federation in November, which was rescinded by a court the following month.

=== Braga ===
Sousa and compatriot teammate Fransérgio agreed on 31 January 2017 to transfer to Braga at the end of the season, by which point he would be out of contract; he signed a four-year deal and Marítimo secured a share of any subsequent transfer fee.

On 12 August 2018, in the season opener, Sousa was one of three players to score two goals in a 4–2 win at home to Nacional. He scored a hat-trick on 14 December in a 4–0 win over Feirense also at the Estádio Municipal de Braga.

Sousa and teammate Paulinho were joint top scorers with four goals in the 2018–19 Taça da Liga with four goals each, including a third-minute strike in the defeat to eventual champions Sporting CP in the semi-final. On 6 March 2019, he signed a new contract until 2022, and finished the league campaign as Braga's top scorer (joint fourth overall) with 15 goals.

=== Shenzhen ===
After rejecting bids of €12–15 million in January, Braga sold Sousa to Chinese Super League club Shenzhen for €5.6 million in July 2019. In his third game, he scored his first two goals in a 4–0 home win over Guangzhou R&F on 14 August to escape the relegation zone.

On 31 January 2020, Sousa returned to Portugal's top flight, joining Benfica on loan without the option to sign. He debuted eight days later in a 3–2 loss at Porto in O Clássico, replacing André Almeida for the last five minutes. He made 13 scoreless appearances for the team from Lisbon, including 14 minutes of their 2–1 loss to Porto in the 2020 Taça de Portugal Final on 1 August.

Sousa signed for Famalicão on 5 October 2020. After five games and no goals in two months, he rescinded his deal and went back to China.

=== Almería ===
On 31 August 2021, Sousa agreed to a one-year contract with Almería in the Spanish Segunda División. Playing mostly from the bench, he contributed 24 games and five goals to their title-winning season, starting with a hat-trick in a 4–1 win at Mirandés on his first start on 24 October.

Sousa signed a new contract in March 2022, lasting until 2024. On 14 August, he made his La Liga debut in a 2–1 home loss to Real Madrid, as a 71st-minute substitute for Umar Sadiq.

On 9 August 2023, Sousa terminated his contract with the Andalusians.

=== Alcorcón ===
On 17 August 2023, Sousa joined Alcorcón also in the Spanish second division.

== International career ==
On 15 March 2019, Sousa was called up to represent the Portugal national team for the UEFA Euro 2020 qualifying campaign. He earned his first cap in a 0–0 draw against Ukraine on 22 March 2019 as a substitute replacing André Silva in the 73rd minute. He was part of Fernando Santos' squad that won the 2019 UEFA Nations League on home soil, but did not feature in either match.

== Career statistics ==
=== Club ===
As of 2 June 2024

Appearances and goals by club, season, and competition
Club	Season	League			State League		National cup		League cup		Continental		Other		Total	
Club	Season	Division	Apps	Goals	Apps	Goals	Apps	Goals	Apps	Goals	Apps	Goals	Apps	Goals	Apps	Goals
Moto Club	2009	Série D	4	1	9 (Note: Five appearances and two goals in Campeonato Maranhense, four appearances and one goal in Campeonato Maranhense Série B)	3	2	1	—		—		5 (Note: Appearance(s) in Copa União do Maranhão)	2	19	7
Operário	2010	Série D	0	0	13 (Note: Appearance(s) in Campeonato Paranaense)	2	—		—		—		—		13	2
Leixões	2010–11	Liga de Honra	10	2	—		1	0	3	1	—		—		14	3
Interclube	2011	Girabola	0	0	—		—		—		—		—		0	0
Tondela	2012–13	Segunda Liga	29	4	—		0	0	0	0	—		—		29	4
Portimonense	2013–14	Segunda Liga	26	6	—		0	0	3	1	—		—		29	7
Marítimo B	2014–15	Segunda Liga	1	1	—		—		—		—		—		1	1
Marítimo	2014–15	Primeira Liga	18	2	—		2	1	1	1	—		—		21	4
Marítimo	2015–16	Primeira Liga	28	12	—		1	0	6	0	—		—		35	12
Marítimo	2016–17	Primeira Liga	15	5	—		1	0	4	2	—		—		20	7
Marítimo	Total		61	19	0	0	4	1	11	3	0	0	0	0	76	23
Braga	2017–18	Primeira Liga	18	8	—		1	0	1	0	6 (Note: Appearance(s) in UEFA Europa League)	2	—		26	10
Braga	2018–19	Primeira Liga	33	15	—		2	0	3	4	2	0	—		40	19
Braga	Total		51	23	0	0	3	0	4	4	8	2	0	0	66	29
Shenzhen	2019	Chinese Super League	10	3	—		0	0	—		—		—		10	3
Benfica (loan)	2019–20	Primeira Liga	11	0	—		0	0	0	0	1	0	—		12	0
Famalicão (loan)	2020–21	Primeira Liga	5	0	—		0	0	—		—		—		5	0
Almería	2021–22	Segunda División	24	5	—		2	0	—		—		—		26	5
Almería	2022–23	La Liga	20	0	—		1	0	—		—		—		21	0
Almería	Total		44	5	0	0	3	0	0	0	0	0	0	0	47	5
Alcorcón	2023–24	Segunda División	23	7	—		1	0	—		—		—		24	7
Career total			275	71	22	5	14	2	21	9	9	2	5	2	345	91

=== International ===
As of 23 May 2019

Appearances and goals by national team and year
National team	Year	Apps	Goals
Portugal	2019	2	0
Total		2	0

== Honours ==
Almería

- Segunda División: 2021–22

Portugal

- UEFA Nations League: 2018–19

Individual

- Primeira Liga Forward of the Month: September 2018, January 2019
