= Ricardo Esgaio =

Portuguese footballer (born 1993)

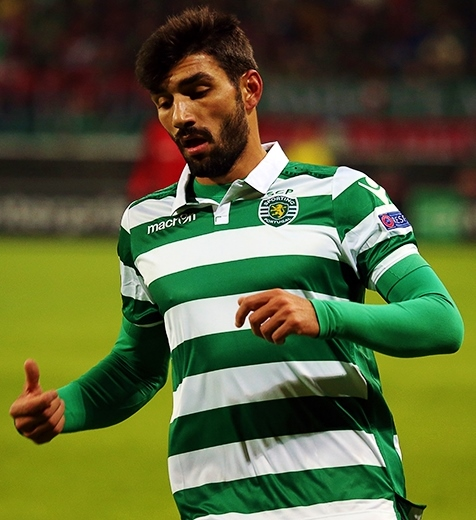
- Esgaio with Sporting CP in 2015

Personal information
- Full name: Ricardo de Sousa Esgaio
- Date of birth: 16 May 1993 (age 33)
- Place of birth: Nazaré, Portugal
- Height: 1.73 m (5 ft 8 in)
- Position: Right-back

Team information
- Current team: Gil Vicente
- Number: 47

Youth career
- 2001–2005: Nazarenos
- 2005–2012: Sporting CP

Senior career*
Years	Team	Apps	(Gls)
2011–2017	Sporting CP	22	(0)
2012–2017	Sporting CP B	87	(34)
2015	→ Académica (loan)	15	(0)
2017–2021	Braga	117	(6)
2021–2025	Sporting CP	89	(1)
2025–2026	Fatih Karagümrük	26	(0)
2026–	Gil Vicente	11	(0)

International career
2008–2009	Portugal U16	9	(3)
2009–2010	Portugal U17	17	(5)
2010	Portugal U18	2	(0)
2010–2012	Portugal U19	29	(5)
2012–2013	Portugal U20	16	(1)
2013–2015	Portugal U21	18	(3)
2016	Portugal U23	5	(0)
Medal record
Men's football
Representing Portugal
UEFA European Under-21 Championship
Runner-up	2015 Czech Republic
- * Club domestic league appearances and goals as of 18:33, 22 November 2026 (UTC)

Ricardo de Sousa Esgaio (Portuguese pronunciation: [ʁiˈkaɾðu ɨʒˈɣaju]; born 16 May 1993) is a Portuguese professional footballer who plays as a right-back for Primeira Liga club Gil Vicente.

He made 243 Primeira Liga appearances with Sporting CP (two spells), Braga and on loan at Académica, winning several cup honours with the first two clubs as well as the 2023–24 and 2024–25 national championships with Sporting.

Esgaio earned 91 caps for Portugal at youth level, and was selected for the 2016 Olympic tournament.

== Club career ==
=== Sporting CP ===
Born in Nazaré, Leiria District, Esgaio joined Sporting CP's youth system at the age of 12, having signed from local Grupo Desportivo os Nazarenos. On 14 December 2011 he was called for a UEFA Europa League group stage game away against Lazio, alongside youth graduates Betinho, Tiago Ilori, João Carlos and João Mário, as the Lions had already secured the first place in their group; he remained an unused substitute in the 2–0 loss.

On 11 August 2012, Esgaio made his senior debut with the reserves in the Segunda Liga, playing 80 minutes in a 1–0 defeat at Oliveirense. He scored his first goal with the side the following matchday, the only in the home fixture against Vitória de Guimarães B; in his early career, he was mainly deployed as a right winger.

Esgaio made his first official appearance with Sporting's main squad on 7 December 2012, starting against Videoton in the last round of the Europa League group stage as the team were already eliminated from knockout stage contention, and featuring the entire 2–1 home win. He made his Primeira Liga debut on 5 January of the following year, playing the last two minutes of a 0–1 home loss to Paços de Ferreira. On 6 November 2013, back in the reserves, he scored a hat-trick in the 4–0 defeat of Chaves.

On 27 January 2015, both Esgaio and Sporting teammate Salim Cissé were loaned to fellow top-tier club Académica de Coimbra until the end of the season.

=== Braga ===
On 17 June 2017, after only 44 competitive matches for Sporting in five years, Esgaio signed a five-year contract with Braga as Rodrigo Battaglia moved in the opposite direction. In his third match for his new team, away to Aves on 20 August, he came on as a last-minute substitute and scored his first goal in the top flight to seal a 2–0 victory.

Esgaio played seven games in the side's victorious run in the Taça de Portugal, including the full 90 minutes in the final against Benfica (2–0). In the last 16, he contributed one goal to the 5–0 rout of Torreense on 13 January 2021.

=== Return to Sporting ===
On 3 July 2021, Esgaio returned to Sporting on a five-year deal, for a €5.5 million fee with a €45 million buyout clause. He scored his first competitive goal for the club on 30 April 2023, in the 2–1 league win over Famalicão.

Esgaio won the first national championship of his career in the 2023–24 campaign. Never an undisputed starter and often criticised for his performances, he did manage 28 appearances for the winners.

Esgaio and Sporting again won the domestic league in 2024–25. He contributed only nine matches to this feat, however.

=== Later career ===
On 1 September 2025, Esgaio terminated his contract with Sporting by mutual agreement. Later that day, the 32-year-old moved abroad for the first time and signed a two-year deal with Fatih Karagümrük of the Turkish Süper Lig. He totalled 28 games in his only season, being relegated.

Esgaio returned to Portugal on 11 June 2026, signing with Gil Vicente until June 2028.

== International career ==
Esgaio played 91 times for Portugal at youth level. He was first choice for the under-21s at the 2015 UEFA European Championship, helping to a runner-up finish in the Czech Republic. He was the captain of the Olympic team at the 2016 tournament in Brazil.

== Personal life ==
Esgaio's younger brother, Tiago, is also a footballer and a defender.

He married Mara Alexandra in June 2018, and the couple later had son Giovanni and daughter Layena.

== Career statistics ==
As of match played 31 July 2025

Appearances and goals by club, season and competition
Club	Season	League			National cup		League cup		Continental		Other		Total	
Club	Season	Division	Apps	Goals	Apps	Goals	Apps	Goals	Apps	Goals	Apps	Goals	Apps	Goals
Sporting CP	2011–12	Primeira Liga	0	0	0	0	0	0	0	0	—		0	0
Sporting CP	2012–13	Primeira Liga	3	0	0	0	2	0	1 (Note: Appearances in UEFA Europa League)	0	—		6	0
Sporting CP	2013–14	Primeira Liga	0	0	0	0	1	0	0	0	—		1	0
Sporting CP	2014–15	Primeira Liga	3	0	2	0	4	0	1 (Note: Appearances in UEFA Champions League)	0	—		10	0
Sporting CP	2015–16	Primeira Liga	8	0	1	0	1	0	3	0	0	0	13	0
Sporting CP	2016–17	Primeira Liga	8	0	2	0	3	0	1	0	—		14	0
Sporting CP	Total		22	0	5	0	11	0	6	0	—		44	0
Sporting CP B	2012–13	Liga Pro	27	17	—		—		—		—		27	17
Sporting CP B	2013–14	Liga Pro	39	16	—		—		—		—		39	16
Sporting CP B	2014–15	Liga Pro	8	0	—		—		—		—		8	0
Sporting CP B	2015–16	Liga Pro	2	0	—		—		—		—		2	0
Sporting CP B	2016–17	Liga Pro	11	1	—		—		—		—		11	1
Sporting CP B	Total		87	34	—		—		—		—		87	34
Académica (loan)	2014–15	Primeira Liga	15	0	0	0	1	0	—		—		16	0
Braga	2017–18	Primeira Liga	30	4	2	0	4	0	12	0	—		48	4
Braga	2018–19	Primeira Liga	25	0	3	0	4	0	2	0	—		34	0
Braga	2019–20	Primeira Liga	30	1	2	0	5	0	12	0	—		49	1
Braga	2020–21	Primeira Liga	32	1	7	1	3	0	6	1	—		48	3
Braga	Total		117	6	14	1	16	0	32	1	—		179	8
Sporting CP	2021–22	Primeira Liga	27	0	5	0	3	0	8	0	1 (Note: Appearance in Supertaça Cândido de Oliveira)	0	44	0
Sporting CP	2022–23	Primeira Liga	25	1	0	0	4	0	9 (Note: Three appearances in UEFA Champions League, six appearances in UEFA Europa League)	0	—		38	1
Sporting CP	2023–24	Primeira Liga	28	0	7	0	3	0	9	0	0	0	47	0
Sporting CP	2024–25	Primeira Liga	9	0	4	1	1	0	4	0	0	0	18	1
Sporting CP	2025–26	Primeira Liga	0	0	0	0	0	0	0	0	1	0	1	0
Sporting CP	Total		89	1	16	1	11	0	30	0	2	0	148	2
Career total			330	41	35	2	39	0	68	1	2	0	474	44

== Honours ==
Sporting CP

- Primeira Liga: 2023–24, 2024–25
- Taça de Portugal: 2014–15, 2024–25
- Taça da Liga: 2021–22
- Supertaça Cândido de Oliveira: 2021

Braga

- Taça de Portugal: 2020–21
- Taça da Liga: 2019–20

Portugal U21

- UEFA European Under-21 Championship runner-up: 2015

Individual

- Primeira Liga Team of the Year: 2019–20
