= Nikola Vukčević (footballer, born 1991) =

Montenegrin footballer

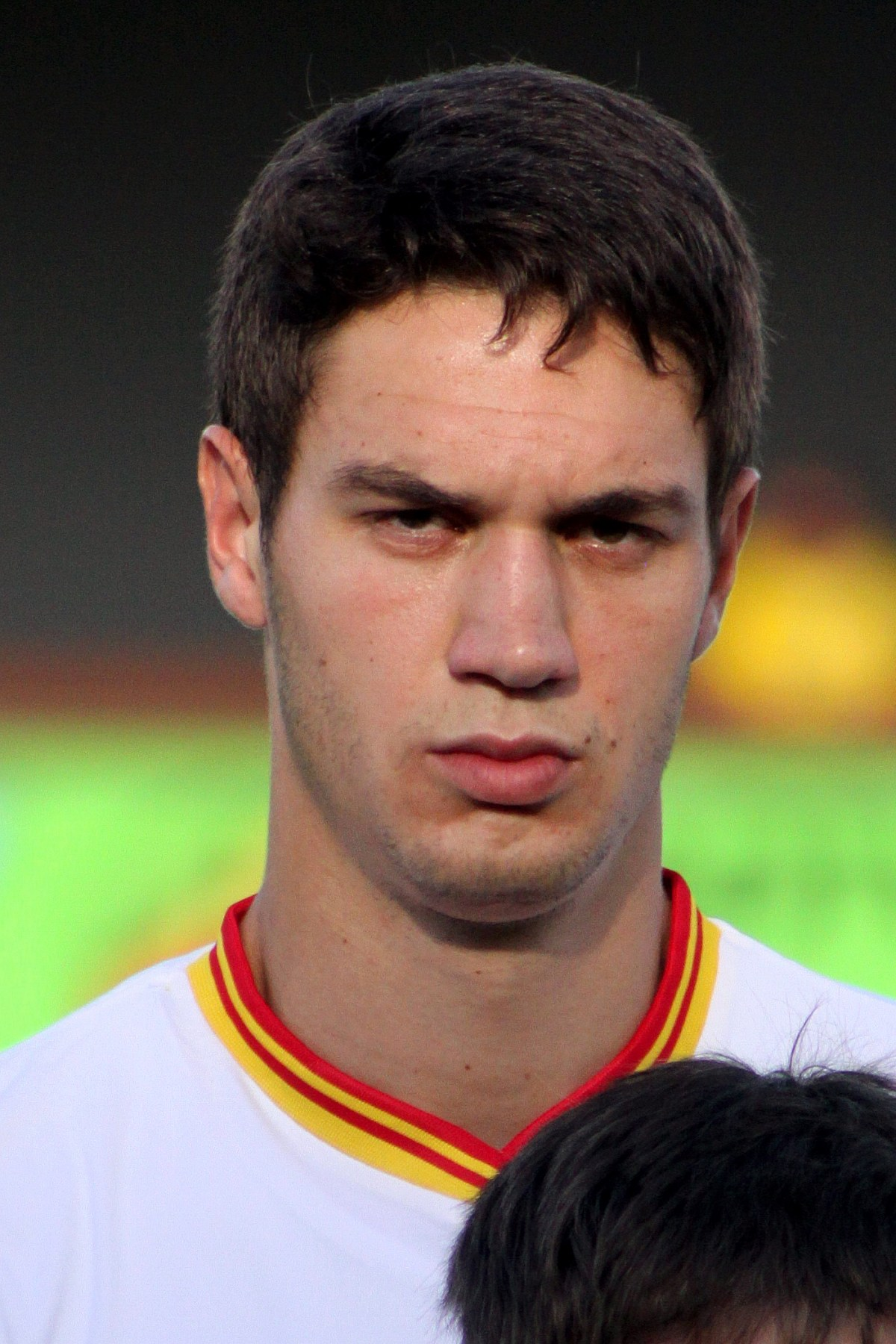
- Vukčević with Montenegro in 2014

Personal information
- Full name: Nikola Vukčević
- Date of birth: 13 December 1991 (age 34)
- Place of birth: Titograd, SFR Yugoslavia
- Height: 1.84 m (6 ft 0 in)
- Position: Defensive midfielder

Senior career*
Years	Team	Apps	(Gls)
2010–2013	Budućnost	65	(4)
2013–2015	Braga B	31	(1)
2014–2018	Braga	76	(4)
2018–2022	Levante	65	(0)
2022–2023	Al-Ahli	17	(0)

International career^{‡}
2012	Montenegro U21	1	(0)
2014–	Montenegro	48	(1)
- * Club domestic league appearances and goals as of 20 April 2023 ‡ National team caps and goals as of 20 April 2023

Nikola Vukčević (Montenegrin: Никола Bукчeвић, pronounced [nǐkola ʋǔktʃeʋitɕ]; born 13 December 1991), also known as Điđo (Ђиђо), is a Montenegrin professional footballer who plays as a defensive midfielder. Vukčević began his professional career with Budućnost. He debuted for the Montenegro national team in 2014.

== Club career ==
=== Budućnost ===
From 2010 to 2013, Vukčević played for local club Budućnost, where he earned 65 caps and scored four goals. During the 2011–12 season, he emerged as one of the best youngsters in the country, and became Budućnost's captain during their title run. In the following season, Vukčević became the most valuable player in Budućnost squad, starting in 27 out of 33 league matches - the most appearances he made during one season at the time. His good performances earned him a starting spot in Montenegro's U21 selection.

=== Braga ===
Vukčević left Budućnost as a free agent due to the expiration of his contract. In September 2013, he signed for Braga, and initially made appearances for their reserve team.

He made his debut for the club in a 3–0 win against Vitória S.C., coming on as a 91st-minute substitute for Felipe Pardo in the Derby do Minho. He became a regular substitute on Braga's first squad and would occasionally start in matches of Taça de Portugal and Taça da Liga.

=== Levante ===
On 9 August 2018, Vukčević moved to Spanish club Levante for a €8.9 million fee and signed a four-year contract.

== International career ==
In August 2012 he participated in the Valeri Lobanovsky Memorial Tournament 2012, where his team lost in the final to Slovakia on penalties and took home silver medals.

Vukčević made his debut against Ghana on 5 March 2014 in a friendly 1–0 win. Though he started the match, Nemanja Nikolić substituted him in the 65th minute. As of 19 October 2020, he has earned a total of 44 caps, scoring 1 goal.

=== International goals ===
Scores and results list Montenegro's goal tally first.

No	Date	Venue	Opponent	Score	Result	Competition
1.	8 October 2016	Podgorica City Stadium, Podgorica, Montenegro	Kazakhstan	2–0	5–0	2018 FIFA World Cup qualification

== Honours ==
Budućnost Podgorica

- Prva CFL: 2011–12
- Montenegrin Cup: 2012–13

Braga

- Taça de Portugal: 2015–16
