= Marcelo Goiano =

Brazilian footballer

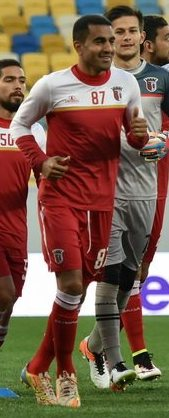
- Marcelo Goiano with Braga

Personal information
- Full name: Marcelo Augusto Ferreira Teixeira
- Date of birth: 13 October 1987 (age 39)
- Place of birth: Goiás, Brazil
- Height: 1.76 m (5 ft 9 in)
- Position: Defender

Youth career
- 2000: Goiás

Senior career*
| Years | Team | Apps | (Gls) |
| 2011 | XV de Jaú | 7 | (0) |
| 2011 | Mineiros | | |
| 2011 | Interporto | | |
| 2012 | Rio Verde | 5 | (0) |
| 2012–2014 | Grêmio Anápolis | 0 | (0) |
| 2012–2013 | → Feirense (loan) | 35 | (0) |
| 2013–2014 | → Académica (loan) | 25 | (0) |
| 2014–2019 | Braga | 115 | (2) |
| 2014–2015 | Braga B | 5 | (0) |
| 2019–2021 | Sivasspor | 39 | (0) |
- * Club domestic league appearances and goals as of 7 February 2021

Marcelo Augusto Ferreira Teixeira (born 13 October 1987), known as Marcelo Goiano, is a Brazilian professional footballer who plays as a defender.

== Club career ==
Born in Goias, Marcelo Goiano played for various clubs in the lower leagues. He spent the 2012–13 season on loan at Portuguese club Feirense from Grêmio Anápolis. He made 25 appearances for the Segunda Liga club before being loaned to Portugal again, this time in the top-flight Primeira Liga to join Académica. The following season, he signed for Braga on a four-year contract.

== Honours ==
Braga

- Taça de Portugal: 2015–16
