= Jefferson (footballer, born July 1988) =

Brazilian footballer

Personal information
- Full name: Jefferson Moreira Nascimento
- Date of birth: 5 July 1988 (age 38)
- Place of birth: Campo Formoso, Brazil
- Height: 1.76 m (5 ft 9 1/2 in)
- Position: Left-back

Senior career*
Years	Team	Apps	(Gls)
2007	São Caetano		
2008	Guaratinguetá	0	(0)
2008–2009	Palmeiras	10	(0)
2010–2011	Grêmio Prudente	0	(0)
2010–2011	→ Estoril (loan)	25	(2)
2011	Fluminense	1	(0)
2012	Náutico	0	(0)
2012	Santa Cruz	0	(0)
2012–2013	Estoril	28	(4)
2013–2019	Sporting CP	88	(3)
2013	Sporting CP B	1	(0)
2017–2018	→ Braga (loan)	26	(0)
2020	Lugano	8	(1)
2020–2021	Casa Pia	15	(0)
2021	Paysandu	0	(0)
2022	XV de Piracicaba	4	(0)
Total		206	(10)
- * Club domestic league appearances and goals

Jefferson Moreira Nascimento (born 5 July 1988), known simply as Jefferson, is a Brazilian former professional footballer who played as a left-back.

== Club career ==
Born in Campo Formoso, Bahia, Jefferson represented in his country Associação Desportiva São Caetano, Guaratinguetá Futebol, SE Palmeiras, Grêmio Barueri Futebol, Fluminense FC, Clube Náutico Capibaribe and Santa Cruz Futebol Clube. His Série A input consisted of 11 matches in representation of the third and fifth clubs over three separate seasons; interspersed with that, he had a one-year spell in Portugal with G.D. Estoril Praia.

Jefferson returned to Estoril for the 2012–13 campaign, with the team now in the Primeira Liga. He scored his first goal as a professional on 11 November 2012 to help to a 2–0 home defeat of Moreirense FC, and also found the net against Sporting CP (3–1 home win) and S.L. Benfica (1–1, away) in an eventual fifth-place finish, with the subsequent qualification for the UEFA Europa League; most of his five goals in all competitions came from long-distance shots.

On 7 June 2013, Jefferson signed a four-year contract with Sporting. He scored twice from 26 games in his debut season, helping to a runner-up position.

Jefferson celebrated his 50th appearance in the Portuguese top division on 5 April 2014, against F.C. Paços de Ferreira. On 16 June 2017, he (on loan) and teammate Ricardo Esgaio (permanent transfer) joined S.C. Braga as Rodrigo Battaglia moved in the opposite direction.

Subsequently, Jefferson represented in quick succession FC Lugano (Swiss Super League) and Casa Pia AC (Liga Portugal 2).

== Career statistics ==
As of 29 April 2017

Club	Season	League		Cup		League Cup		Continental		Other		Total	
Club	Season	Apps	Goals	Apps	Goals	Apps	Goals	Apps	Goals	Apps	Goals	Apps	Goals
Palmeiras	2008	5	0	0	0	0	0	4	1	0	0	9	1
Palmeiras	2009	5	0	0	0	0	0	2	0	7	1	14	1
Grêmio Barueri	2010	0	0	0	0	0	0	0	0	12	2	12	2
Estoril	2010–11	25	2	1	0	5	0	0	0	0	0	31	2
Fluminense	2011	1	0	0	0	0	0	0	0	0	0	1	0
Náutico	2012	0	0	2	0	0	0	0	0	18	1	20	1
Estoril	2012–13	28	4	1	0	3	1	0	0	0	0	31	5
Sporting CP	2013–14	26	2	1	0	3	0	0	0	0	0	30	2
Sporting CP	2014–15	23	1	3	0	0	0	4	1	0	0	30	2
Sporting CP	2015–16	18	0	2	0	1	0	5	0	1	0	27	0
Sporting CP	2016–17	7	0	1	0	0	0	1	0	0	0	9	0
Total		0	0	0	0	0	0	0	0	0	0	0	0

== Honours ==
Palmeiras

- Campeonato Paulista: 2008

Sporting CP

- Taça de Portugal: 2014–15, 2018–19
- Taça da Liga: 2018–19
- Supertaça Cândido de Oliveira: 2015
