= Fransérgio (footballer, born 1990) =

Brazilian footballer

Personal information
- Full name: Fransérgio Rodrigues Barbosa
- Date of birth: 18 October 1990 (age 36)
- Place of birth: Rondonópolis, Brazil
- Height: 1.86 m (6 ft 1 in)
- Position: Defensive midfielder

Team information
- Current team: Operário-PR

Youth career
- Luverdense-MT
- Sorriso-MT
- 2003–2009: Paraná
- 2008–2009: Atlético Paranaense

Senior career*
| Years | Team | Apps | (Gls) |
| 2009–2011 | Atlético Paranaense | 33 | (1) |
| 2010 | → Paraná (loan) | 3 | (0) |
| 2012–2013 | Internacional | 2 | (0) |
| 2012 | → Criciúma (loan) | 30 | (2) |
| 2013 | → Ceará (loan) | 2 | (0) |
| 2013 | → Guaratinguetá (loan) | 15 | (1) |
| 2014–2015 | Marítimo B | 5 | (2) |
| 2014–2017 | Marítimo | 96 | (14) |
| 2017–2021 | Braga | 96 | (12) |
| 2021–2023 | Bordeaux | 64 | (4) |
| 2023–2024 | Coritiba | 27 | (0) |
| 2024 | Marítimo | 11 | (0) |
| 2025– | Operário-PR | 2 | (0) |
- * Club domestic league appearances and goals as of 13:56, 2 February 2025 (UTC)

Fransérgio Rodrigues Barbosa (born 18 October 1990), known as Fransérgio, is a Brazilian professional footballer who plays as a defensive midfielder for Operário-PR

After starting his career with Atlético Paranaense and Internacional, he spent seven years in Portugal, where he made 192 Primeira Liga appearances split equally between Marítimo and Braga, scoring 26 goals. With the latter, he won the Taça da Liga in 2020 and the Taça de Portugal in 2021. He also played in Ligue 1 and Ligue 2 for Bordeaux in France.

== Career ==
=== Early career and Atlético-PR ===
Born in Rondonópolis, Mato Grosso, Fransérgio played as a youth for Luverdense and Sorriso in his state before joining Paraná and eventually their rivals Atlético-PR. He represented the club for four seasons in Campeonato Brasileiro Série A and scored the opening goal on 13 August 2011 in a 2–2 draw at São Paulo. In September 2010, he was loaned back to Paraná in Série B for the rest of the year.

=== Internacional ===
On 5 February 2012, Fransérgio made his debut for Internacional in the Campeonato Gaúcho, coming on as a 66th-minute substitute for Jesús Dátolo in a 2–2 draw at rivals Grêmio; he was not officially presented by the club until after the game.

Fransérgio was loaned out in May 2012 to Série B club Criciúma, and in December to Ceará. He arrived at second-tier club Guaratinguetá on loan in May 2013, and played 15 games, scoring in a 3–0 home win over Icasa on 13 July.

=== Marítimo ===
In January 2014, Fransérgio moved abroad for the first time, signing a 2 1/2-year deal with Marítimo of Portugal's Primeira Liga; his agent Marcelo Lipatín had played for the same club. He played seven matches in his first season in Madeira, and scored to conclude their 3–1 home win over Académica de Coimbra on 19 April.

Fransérgio scored twice on 28 September 2014 in a 4–0 win over Vitória de Guimarães at the Estádio dos Barreiros in which all the goals came in the first half. A week later, he was sent off in a 3–2 loss at Paços de Ferreira.

Fransérgio played two consecutive Taça da Liga finals for the club from Funchal, both lost to Benfica, and scored a penalty in the latter on 20 May 2016 in a 6–2 loss at the Estadio Cidade de Coimbra. Twelve days before that match, he was sent off in a 2–0 home loss to the same team. He scored a career-best five league goals over that season, including another brace against Vitória Guimarães in a 3–0 home win on 17 April.

=== Braga ===
In January 2017, fellow top-flight team Braga announced the signings of Fransérgio and teammate Dyego Sousa for the new season, taking him on a five-year contract and giving Marítimo a share of any subsequent transfer. He made his debut on 27 July in a 1–1 draw away to Sweden's AIK in the UEFA Europa League third qualifying round first leg, his first game in European competition. He played nine games and scored four times in that continental campaign, including two in a 3–1 home win over Hoffenheim in the last group game on 23 November.

On 13 September 2019, Fransérgio received a straight red card at the end of a 1–0 loss at Vitória de Setúbal for attempting to strike José Semedo; the offence was caught by a video assistant referee. He played four matches of their victorious Taça da Liga campaign, scoring in a 4–1 final group game win over Paços de Ferreira on 22 December, and in the final on 25 January he took the shot which rebounded for Ricardo Horta to score the only goal against Porto in added time. On 12 February 2020 he extended his contract until 2024 with a buyout clause of €20 million.

On 25 October 2020, Fransérgio was sent off for his part in a melée after David Carmo had been dismissed for a foul on Marcus Edwards in a 1–0 derby win at Vitória de Guimarães; the Braga pair were suspended for three games and opponent Jorge Fernandes for two. Days later, he was diagnosed with COVID-19, and missed the Europa League game against Leicester City as a result. He ended the season as a national cup winner, having scored an equaliser in the 12th minute of added time in the first leg of the semi-finals against Porto.

In one of his final matches, the 2021 Supertaça Cândido de Oliveira on 31 July, he scored to open a 2–1 loss to Sporting CP at the Estádio Municipal de Aveiro.

=== Bordeaux ===
On 25 August 2021, Fransérgio signed a three-year contract for Bordeaux. The initial transfer fee was €4.5 million, with a potential €3 million in addition according to clauses. He made his Ligue 1 debut three days later in a 4–0 loss at Nice. Bordeaux ended the season relegated for the first time in 30 years; local newspaper Sud-Ouest named him one of the three biggest disappointments on the team alongside Marcelo and M'Baye Niang, with an average match rating of 3.1 out of 10.

Fransérgio scored his first goal in French football on 8 October 2022, an added-time strike to conclude a 2–0 home win over Metz to put Les Girondins in first place in Ligue 2.

=== Later career ===
Having been a target for Botafogo a year earlier, Fransérgio returned to his country's league for the first time in nearly a decade on 28 June 2023, signing with Coritiba until 2026. The move followed the recission of his contract at Bordeaux. He made his debut on 8 July as a starter in a 3–1 comeback win at home to América Mineiro.

On 13 August 2024, having rescinded his contract at Coritiba, Fransérgio returned to second-tier Marítimo after seven years away. He had a two-year contract, but cancelled it on 4 December to go back to the state of Paraná and sign for Operário-PR for the year 2025; the motive for this move was to be nearer to his son, who had been diagnosed with autism.

== Honours ==
Athletico Paranaense

- Campeonato Paranaense: 2009

Internacional

- Campeonato Gaúcho: 2012

Braga

- Taça de Portugal: 2020–21
- Taça da Liga: 2019–20

Operário Ferroviário

- Campeonato Paranaense: 2025
