= Raúl Silva (footballer) =

Brazilian footballer

Personal information
- Full name: Raúl Michel Melo da Silva
- Date of birth: 4 November 1989 (age 37)
- Place of birth: Belém, Brazil
- Height: 1.87 m (6 ft 1 1/2 in)
- Position: Defender

Youth career
- –2009: Remo

Senior career*
Years	Team	Apps	(Gls)
2010–2011	Remo	3	(0)
2010	→ Atlético Paranaense (loan)	0	(0)
2011–2012	Sport	1	(0)
2012	→ Arapongas (loan)	0	(0)
2012	→ Criciúma (loan)	0	(0)
2012	→ Londrina (loan)	0	(0)
2013	Paysandu	22	(1)
2014	Figueirense	3	(0)
2015–2017	Marítimo	56	(10)
2016	→ Ceará (loan)	0	(0)
2017–2022	Braga	73	(11)
2022	→ Estoril (loan)	8	(0)
2022–2024	Universitatea Craiova	47	(1)
2024–2025	Farense	10	(1)
- * Club domestic league appearances and goals as of 3 June 2025

Raúl Michel Melo da Silva (born 4 November 1989) is a Brazilian professional footballer who plays as a centre-back.

== Career ==
=== Brazil ===
Born in Belém, Pará, Silva began his career with hometown club Clube do Remo in the Campeonato Brasileiro Série D. In September 2010, he signed on loan for Série A club Clube Atlético Paranaense until the end of the year.

Silva moved to Sport Recife in 2011, where he played one Série B match. After loans to Arapongas Esporte Clube and Criciúma Esporte Clube, and a passage at Paysandú FC, he signed for top-flight club Figueirense FC for the year 2014.

=== Marítimo ===
On 6 January 2015, Silva moved abroad for the first time, signing a 2 1/2-year deal with C.S. Marítimo of Portugal. He made his Primeira Liga debut 19 days later in a 1–0 home win over FC Porto. He made three appearances in the Taça da Liga, including the 2–1 final loss to S.L. Benfica on 29 May, in which he was sent off at the start of the second half; he had already been dismissed twice in the league season up to then. He scored twice in the campaign, starting on 15 February in a 4–3 comeback win at F.C. Penafiel.

Silva was sent off three more times in his second season in Madeira, including halfway through the first period of a 1–0 home loss to Funchal rivals C.F. União on 16 January 2016, one of three expulsions for his team in that derby. By the end of the month, he was loaned back to Brazil with Ceará Sporting Club for a full year.

In 2016–17, his last season at Marítimo, Silva scored a career-best seven goals in 29 games as the team came sixth. This included two on 22 April in a 3–0 home win over C.F. Os Belenenses, which earned him the award of Player of the Week.

=== Braga ===
On 22 May 2017, Silva signed a five-year deal at S.C. Braga of the same league. That season he kept his goal-scoring prowess scoring six goals in the league and making six assists.

=== Estoril ===
On 31 January 2022, Braga agreed a loan deal until the end of the season with G.D. Estoril Praia. He made his debut with the club coming on the 60' minute in a 3–0 loss to Sporting CP having been sent off 4 minutes after debuting.

== Honours ==
Figueirense

- Campeonato Catarinense: 2014

Paysandu

- Campeonato Paraense: 2013

Braga

- Taça da Liga: 2019–20
- Taça de Portugal: 2020–21
- Supertaça Cândido de Oliveira runner-up: 2021
