= 2017–18 C.S. Marítimo season =

C.S. Marítimo
2017–18 season
- President: Carlos Pereira
- Manager: Daniel Ramos
- Stadium: Estádio do Marítimo
- Primeira Liga: 7th
- Taça de Portugal: Round of 16
- Taça da Liga: Group stage
- UEFA Europa League: Play-off
- Top goalscorer: League: Ricardo Valente (4); All: Rodrigo Pinho (10)
- Highest home attendance: 9,537; Marítimo 1–1 Benfica (1 October 2017)
- Lowest home attendance: 4,581; Marítimo 3–2 União da Madeira (29 December 2017)
- Average home league attendance: 7110.125
- Biggest win: Marítimo 2–0 Botev Plovdiv (3 August 2017)
- Biggest defeat: Sporting CP 5–0 Marítimo (7 January 2018)
Home colours	Away colours
- All statistics correct as of 28 July 2017.

This article shows C.S. Marítimo's player statistics and all matches that the club played during the 2017–18 season.

== Players ==
=== Current squad ===
As of 9 January 2018.

Note: Flags indicate national team as defined under FIFA eligibility rules; some limited exceptions apply. Players may hold more than one non-FIFA nationality.

No.	Pos.	Nation	Player
1	GK	IRI	Amir Abedzadeh
2	DF	POR	Pedro Coronas
3	DF	BRA	Dráusio
4	DF	BRA	Pablo
5	DF	MOZ	Zainadine Júnior
6	MF	BEL	Erdem Şen
7	FW	BRA	Ibson Melo
9	FW	BRA	Rodrigo Pinho
10	MF	ARM	Gevorg Ghazaryan
11	MF	BRA	Éber Bessa
12	FW	POR	Edgar Costa
14	DF	POR	Luís Martins (on loan from Granada)
15	MF	BRA	Jean Cléber
20	MF	BRA	Baiano

No.	Pos.	Nation	Player
21	MF	POR	João Gamboa
23	DF	BRA	Bebeto
24	DF	CPV	Diney
27	GK	BRA	Rafael Broetto
29	MF	POR	Filipe Oliveira
30	FW	GBS	Piqueti
33	FW	POR	Ricardo Valente
45	DF	POR	Fábio China
66	MF	POR	Fábio Pacheco
70	DF	POR	Cristiano Gomes
93	FW	BRA	Everton
94	GK	BRA	Charles
—	DF	POR	Rúben Ferreira
—	FW	CMR	Joel (on loan from Cruzeiro)

=== Out on loan ===
Note: Flags indicate national team as defined under FIFA eligibility rules; some limited exceptions apply. Players may hold more than one non-FIFA nationality.

No.	Pos.	Nation	Player
—	MF	BRA	Samuel Santos (at Botafogo (SP) until 31 December 2017)
—	MF	CMR	Donald Djoussé (at Académica de Coimbra until 31 July 2018)

== Competitions ==
=== Primeira Liga ===
==== League table ====
Pos	Team	Pld	W	D	L	GF	GA	GD	Pts	Qualification or relegation
5	Rio Ave	34	15	6	13	40	42	−2	51	Qualification for the Europa League second qualifying round (Note: Desportivo das Aves qualified for the Europa league group stage by winning the 2017–18 Taça de Portugal. However, since they failed to obtain a license for European competitions, the spot awarded to the cup winners (Europa League group stage) was passed to the third-placed team, the spot awarded to the third-placed team (Europa League third qualifying round) was passed to the fourth-placed team, and the spot awarded to the fourth-placed team was passed to the fifth-placed team (Europa league second qualifying round).)
6	Chaves	34	13	8	13	47	55	−8	47 (Note: Chaves finished ahead of Marítimo on head-to-head points: Chaves 4–1 Marítimo, Marítimo 1–2 Chaves.)	
7	Marítimo	34	13	8	13	36	49	−13	47	
8	Boavista	34	13	6	15	35	44	−9	45	
9	Vitória de Guimarães	34	13	4	17	45	56	−11	43	

Source: Liga Portugal
Rules for classification: 1) Points; 2) Head-to-head points; 3) Head-to-head goal difference; 4) Head-to-head away goals scored; 5) Goal difference; 6) Matches won; 7) Goals scored; 8) Play-off. (Note: only criteria 1, 5, 6 and 7 are applied to establish the classification during the competition.)

=== Results by round ===
Round	1	2	3	4	5	6	7	8	9	10	11	12	13	14	15	16	17	18	19	20	21	22	23	24	25	26	27	28	29	30	31	32	33	34
Result	W	L	W	W	W	W	L	D	L	W	W	D	D	W	L	L	L	D	D	L	L	L	D	W	L	W	W	W	D	D	L			
Position	6	6	6	5	4	3	4	4	5	5	5	5	5	5	5	5	5	6	6	6	6	6	6	6	6	6	6	6	6	6	6			

Updated to match(es) played on 20 April 2018. Source:
W = Win; D = Draw; L = Loss

==== Results summary ====
Overall								Home						Away					
Pld	W	D	L	GF	GA	GD	Pts	W	D	L	GF	GA	GD	W	D	L	GF	GA	GD
32	12	8	12	33	43	−10	44	9	4	3	22	13	+9	3	4	9	11	30	−19

Last updated: 20 April 2018.

==== Matches ====
8 August 2017 1	Marítimo	1–0	Paços de Ferreira	Funchal
16:00 WEST (UTC+01:00)	Bessa 57'			Stadium: Estádio do Marítimo; Attendance: 9,237; Referee: Manuel Oliveira

12 August 2017 2	Belenenses	1–0	Marítimo	Lisbon
18:15 WEST (UTC+01:00)	Tomás 47'			Stadium: Estádio do Restelo; Attendance: 2,153; Referee: João Pinheiro

19 August 2017 3	Marítimo	1–0	Boavista	Funchal
18:15 WEST (UTC+01:00)	Bebeto 58'			Stadium: Estádio do Marítimo; Attendance: 6,771; Referee: Luís Godinho

28 August 2017 4	Portimonense	1–2	Marítimo	Portimão
21:00 WEST (UTC+01:00)	Ewerton (yellow card) 52'; Pires 86'	Report	Gamboa (yellow card) 16'; Everton (yellow card) 24'; Costa 69'; Gildo (yellow card) 75'; Valente 90+1'	Stadium: Estádio Municipal de Portimão; Referee: Vítor Ferreira

9 September 2017 5	Marítimo	1–0	Rio Ave	Funchal
19:15 WEST (UTC+01:00)	Ibson 90+2'	Report	Geraldes (red card) 24'; Marcelo (yellow card) 45+3'; Teles (yellow card) 61'; Marcão (yellow card) 77'	Stadium: Estádio do Marítimo; Attendance: 5,348; Referee: Bruno Estaves

16 September 2017 6	Marítimo	2–1	Desportivo das Aves	Funchal
17:00 WEST (UTC+01:00)	Pinho 16', 39'; Pacheco (yellow card) 50'; Pablo (yellow card) 70'; Lundberg (yellow card) 90+1'	Report	Washington (yellow card) 73'; Machado (yellow card) 78'; Guedes 81'	Stadium: Estádio do Marítimo; Attendance: 6,447; Referee: Carlos Xistra

24 September 2017 7	Vitória de Guimarães	2–1	Marítimo	Guimarães
17:00 WEST (UTC+01:00)	Raphinha 5'; Aurélio (yellow card) 28'; Jubal (red card) 63'; Hurtado (yellow card) 66'	Report	Costa 15'; Pinho (yellow card) 29'; Júnior (red card) 63'; Bebeto (yellow card) 74'	Stadium: Estádio D. Afonso Henriques; Attendance: 18,019; Referee: Fábio Veríssimo

1 October 2017 8	Marítimo	1–1	Benfica	Funchal
21:30 WEST (UTC+01:00)	Pablo (yellow card) 10'; Costa (yellow card) 49'; Valente 66'	Report	Jonas 2'; Fejsa (yellow card) 13'	Stadium: Estádio do Marítimo; Attendance: 9,537; Referee: Jorge Sousa

21 October 2017 9	Vitória de Setúbal	3–1	Marítimo	Setúbal
19:15 WEST (UTC+01:00)	Teixeira 78'; Paciência 90+1'; Amaral 90+7'	Report	Gamboa 45+2'; Pacheco (yellow card) 62' (yellow-red card) 65'	Stadium: Estádio do Bonfim; Attendance: 2,253; Referee: Vasco Santos

28 October 2017 10	Marítimo	2–0	Tondela	Funchal
17:00	Júnior (yellow card) 12'; Pinho 20'; Bebeto (yellow card) 30'; China (yellow card) 54'; Valente 57'; Bessa (yellow card) 83'	Report	Tomané (yellow card) 32'; Cardoso (yellow card) 85'; Wágner (yellow card) 87'	Stadium: Estádio do Marítimo; Attendance: 6,735; Referee: Hélder Malheiro

5 November 2017 11	Feirense	0–1	Marítimo	Santa Maria da Feira
17:00	Alcénat (yellow card) 32'; Cris (yellow card) 43'; Briseño (yellow card) 90+6'	Report	Pinho (yellow card) 27'; Jean Cléber (yellow card) 30'; China (yellow card) 33'; Júnior (yellow card) 40'; Valente 45'; Charles (yellow card) 85'; Lundberg (yellow card) 85'	Stadium: Estádio Marcolino de Castro; Attendance: 2,944; Referee: Hugo Miguel

26 November 2017 12	Marítimo	0–0	Estoril	Funchal
16:00	Júnior (yellow card) 61'	Report	Evangelista (yellow card) 88'; Boa Morte (yellow card) 90+5'	Stadium: Estádio do Marítimo; Attendance: 6,469; Referee: Rui Oliveira

2 December 2017 13	Moreirense	1–1	Marítimo	Moreira de Cónegos
16:00	Tozé 26' (pen.); Belkaroui (yellow card) 50' (yellow-red card) 70'; Semedo (yellow card) 66'	Report	Dráusio 30'; Şen (yellow card) 87'	Stadium: Parque Joaquim de Almeida Freitas; Attendance: 1,583; Referee: Tiago Martins

11 December 2017 14	Marítimo	1–0	Braga	Funchal
21:00	Júnior 55'; Charles (yellow card) 77'; Pacheco (yellow card) 80'	Report	Marcelo Goiano (yellow card) 43'; Silva (yellow card) 82'; Vukčević (yellow card) 90+6'	Stadium: Estádio do Marítimo; Attendance: 6,327; Referee: Rui Costa

18 December 2017 15	Porto	3–1	Marítimo	Porto
21:00	Reyes 19'; Marega 45+1', 78'; Aboubakar (yellow card) 66'	Report	Pacheco 26'; China (yellow card) 33'; Gamboa (yellow card) 36' (yellow-red card) 39'	Stadium: Estádio do Dragão; Attendance: 34,123; Referee: Manuel Mota

3 January 2018 16	Marítimo	1–2	Chaves	Funchal
18:15	Gamboa (yellow card) 55'; Martins (yellow card) 59'; Costa (yellow card) 67'; Oliveira 83'; Diney (yellow card) 88'	Report	Platiny 24'; Davidson 50'; Tiba (yellow card) 53'; Pereira (yellow card) 90+6'	Stadium: Estádio do Marítimo; Attendance: 4,533; Referee: Manuel Oliveira

7 January 2018 17	Sporting CP	5–0	Marítimo	Lisbon
18:00	Dost 21', 74', 78'; Ruiz 50'; Acuña 90+1'	Report	Baiano (yellow card) 62'	Stadium: Estádio José Alvalade; Attendance: 41,754; Referee: Carlos Xistra

13 January 2018 18	Paços de Ferreira	0–0	Marítimo	Paços de Ferreira
18:15	Leão (yellow card) 41'	Report	Pinho (yellow card) 40'; Júnior (yellow card) 78'	Stadium: Capital do Móvel; Attendance: 1,237; Referee: Manuel Mota

20 January 2018 19	Marítimo	0–0	Belenenses	Funchal
16:00	Valente (yellow card) 83'	Report	Maurides (yellow card) 36'; Bakić (yellow card) 76'; Tomás (yellow card) 79' (yellow-red card) 81'; Fredy (yellow card) 86'	Stadium: Estádio do Marítimo; Attendance: 5,886; Referee: Luís Ferreira

31 January 2018 20	Boavista	2–1	Marítimo	Porto
19:00	Simão (yellow card) 22'; Mateus 43'; Njie 80'	Report	Everton 8'; Ferreira (yellow card) 39'; Júnior (yellow card) 60'	Stadium: Estádio do Bessa; Attendance: 3,695; Referee: Bruno Esteves

5 February 2018 21	Marítimo	0–3	Portimonense	Funchal
19:00	Everton (yellow card) 25'; Ferreira (yellow card) 37'; Bebeto (yellow card) 47'; Pinho (yellow card) 57'	Report	Fabrício 13', 18', (yellow card) 42'; Bruno Tabata 29'	Stadium: Estádio do Marítimo; Attendance: 5,264; Referee: Jorge Sousa

10 February 2018 22	Rio Ave	3–0	Marítimo	Vila do Conde
16:00	Pelé 28' (pen.); Novais 39'; Tarantini (yellow card) 72'; Lopes 74'	Report	Pablo (yellow card) 38'; Júnior (yellow card) 44'; Pacheco (yellow card) 62'; China (yellow card) 82' (yellow-red card) 87'; Joel (yellow card) 84'	Stadium: Estádio dos Arcos; Attendance: 2,754; Referee: Luís Godinho

18 February 2018 23	Aves	0–0	Marítimo	Aves
				Stadium: Estádio do CD Aves

=== Taça de Portugal ===
==== Third round ====
14 October 2017	Torcatense	0–1	Marítimo	São Torcato
16:00		Summary		Stadium: Parque Desportivo do Arnado

==== Fourth round ====
19 November 2017	Oliveirense	2–3 (a.e.t.)	Marítimo	Santa Maria de Oliveira
14:30	Fabinho (yellow card) 14'; Apolo Silva 36', 83'	Report	Pinho 41', 90+3', 105'; Dráusio (yellow card) 72'	Stadium: Estádio da Ribes; Referee: Vasco Santos

==== Round of 16 ====
6 December 2017	Marítimo	0–0 (a.e.t.) (2–4 p)	Cova da Piedade	Funchal
16:00		Report	Rocha (yellow card) 17' (yellow-red card) 101'; Anacoura (yellow card) 75'; Evaldo (yellow card) 114'; Soares (yellow card) 118'	Stadium: Estádio do Marítimo

=== Taça da Liga ===
==== Second Qualifying Round ====
1 September 2017	Marítimo	1–0	Estoril	Funchal
19:00	Pinho 30'; Bessa (yellow card) 62'; Diney (yellow card) 90+2'	Report	Halliche (yellow card) 51'	Stadium: Estádio do Marítimo; Attendance: 4,394; Referee: Manuel Mota

==== Group stage ====
Pos	Team	Pld	W	D	L	GF	GA	GD	Pts	Qualification
1	Sporting CP	3	1	2	0	7	1	+6	5	Advance to knockout phase
2	Marítimo	3	1	2	0	3	2	+1	5	
3	Belenenses	3	0	3	0	2	2	0	3	
4	União da Madeira	3	0	1	2	3	10	−7	1	

Updated to match(es) played on 30 December 2017. Source:
Rules for classification: Tiebreakers

19 September 2017 1	Sporting CP	0–0	Marítimo	Lisbon
20:15 WEST (UTC+01:00)		Report		Stadium: Estádio José Alvalade; Attendance: 22,127; Referee: Manuel Mota

21 December 2017 2	Belenenses	0–0	Marítimo	Lisbon
21:00 WET (UTC+00:00)		Report		Stadium: Estádio do Restelo; Attendance: 747; Referee: Luís Godinho

29 December 2017 3	Marítimo	3–2	União da Madeira	Funchal
19:15 WET (UTC+00:00)		Report		Stadium: Estádio do Marítimo; Attendance: 4,581; Referee: Tiago Martins

=== UEFA Europa League ===
==== Third Qualifying Round ====
27 July 2017 First Leg	(Bulgaria) Botev Plovdiv	0–0	(Portugal) Marítimo	Burgas
19:30	Dimov (yellow card) 41'; Nedelev (yellow card) 44'; Baltanov (yellow card) 90+4'	Report	Bessa (yellow card) 45+4'; Gamboa (yellow card) 68'; Valente (yellow card) 90+4'	Stadium: Lazur Stadium; Attendance: 10,843; Referee: (Sweden) Bojan Pandžić

3 August 2017 Second Leg	(Portugal) Marítimo	2–0 (2–0 agg.)	(Bulgaria) Botev Plovdiv	Funchal
20:00	Pinho 34' (pen.); Valente 49'; Lundberg (yellow card) 87'; Bebeto (yellow card) 90+3'	Report	Stoyanov (yellow card) 32'; Baltanov (yellow card) 61'; Minev (yellow card) 79'; Tasev (yellow card) 88'; Dimov (yellow card) 90+2'	Stadium: Estádio do Marítimo; Attendance: 6,143; Referee: (Serbia) Srđan Jovanović

==== Play-off Round ====
17 August 2017 First Leg	(Portugal) Marítimo	0–0	(Ukraine) Dynamo Kyiv	Funchal
21:30	Gamboa (yellow card) 30'; Şen (yellow card) 82'; Ibson (yellow card) 84'	Report	Harmash (yellow card) 30'; Kádár (yellow card) 54'; Sydorchuk (yellow card) 60'; Yarmolenko (yellow card) 63'; Khacheridi (yellow card) 80' (yellow-red card) 89'	Stadium: Estádio do Marítimo; Attendance: 8,764; Referee: (Denmark) Jakob Kehlet

24 August 2017 Second Leg	(Ukraine) Dynamo Kyiv	3–1 (3–1 agg.)	(Portugal) Marítimo	Kyiv
18:45	Kędziora (yellow card) 8'; Harmash 32' (yellow card) 74'; Morozyuk 35'; González (yellow card) 36' (goal) 61'; Kádár (yellow card) 52'; Buyalskyi (yellow card) 81'	Report	Charles (yellow card) 33'; Pablo (yellow card) 33'; Bessa (yellow card) 36'; Şen 68'	Stadium: Olimpiyskiy National Sports Complex; Attendance: 23,194; Referee: (Israel) Liran Liany
