= 2021–22 C.S. Marítimo season =

C.S. Marítimo
2021–22 season
- Chairman: Carlos Pereira
- Manager: Julio Velázquez
- Stadium: Estádio do Marítimo
- Primeira Liga: 12th
- Taça de Portugal: Pre-season
- Taça da Liga: First round
Home colours	Away colours	Third colours

The 2021–22 season is the 72nd season in the existence of C.S. Marítimo and the club's third consecutive season in the top flight of Portuguese football. In addition to the domestic league, C.S. Marítimo are participating in this season's edition of the Taça de Portugal and the Taça da Liga.

== Players ==
=== First-team squad ===
As of 31 July 2021

Note: Flags indicate national team as defined under FIFA eligibility rules; some limited exceptions apply. Players may hold more than one non-FIFA nationality.

No.	Pos.	Nation	Player
1	GK	POR	Miguel Silva
2	DF	BRA	Cláudio Winck
4	DF	BRA	Matheus Costa
5	DF	MOZ	Zainadine Júnior
6	MF	POR	Filipe Cardoso
7	FW	POR	André Vidigal
9	FW	IRI	Ali Alipour
10	MF	ITA	Stefano Beltrame
11	FW	ANG	Felício Milson
12	FW	POR	Edgar Costa
15	MF	ARG	Iván Rossi
16	MF	POR	Diogo Mendes

No.	Pos.	Nation	Player
20	MF	POR	Bruno Xadas
23	FW	POR	Rúben Macedo
27	DF	SWE	Tim Söderström
45	DF	POR	Fábio China
60	MF	POR	Pedro Pelágio
66	DF	BRA	Léo Andrade
93	FW	BRA	Henrique
94	DF	BRA	Vítor Costa
95	FW	CMR	Joel Tagueu
96	GK	POR	Pedro Teixeira
98	GK	BRA	Vitor Eudes
—	DF	ESP	Jorge Sáenz (loan from Valencia)

=== Other players under contract ===
Note: Flags indicate national team as defined under FIFA eligibility rules; some limited exceptions apply. Players may hold more than one non-FIFA nationality.

No.	Pos.	Nation	Player
—	DF	BRA	Facundo Constantini
—	MF	POR	Francisco França
—	FW	BRA	Kibe Jefferson

No.	Pos.	Nation	Player
—	FW	BRA	Marcelinho
—	MF	POR	Marcos Silva
—	DF	COL	Moisés Mosquera

== Pre-season and friendlies ==
Win Draw Loss Fixtures

== Competitions ==
=== Overall record ===
Competition	First match	Last match	Starting round	Final position	Record							
Competition	First match	Last match	Starting round	Final position	Pld	W	D	L	GF	GA	GD	Win %
Primeira Liga	7 August 2021	May 2022	Matchday 1		27	8	9	10	31	34	−3	29.63
Taça de Portugal	17 October 2021		Third round	Third round	1	0	1	0	2	2	+0	0.00
Taça da Liga	25 July 2021		First round	First round	1	0	0	1	0	1	−1	0.00
Total					29	8	10	11	33	37	−4	27.59

Last updated: 20 March 2022
Source: Soccerway

=== Primeira Liga ===
==== League table ====
Pos	Team	Pld	W	D	L	GF	GA	GD	Pts
8	Famalicão	34	9	12	13	45	51	−6	39 (Note: Head-to-head points: Famalicão 4, Estoril 1.)
9	Estoril	34	9	12	13	36	43	−7	39
10	Marítimo	34	9	11	14	39	44	−5	38 (Note: Head-to-head points: Marítimo 10, Paços de Ferreira 8, Boavista 7, Portimonense 6.)
11	Paços de Ferreira	34	9	11	14	29	44	−15	38
12	Boavista	34	7	17	10	39	52	−13	38

Source: Liga Portugal
Rules for classification: 1) Points; 2) Head-to-head points; 3) Head-to-head goal difference; 4) Head-to-head away goals scored; 5) Goal difference; 6) Matches won; 7) Goals scored; 8) Play-off.

==== Results summary ====
Overall								Home						Away					
Pld	W	D	L	GF	GA	GD	Pts	W	D	L	GF	GA	GD	W	D	L	GF	GA	GD
4	1	1	2	4	6	−2	4	0	1	1	1	3	−2	1	0	1	3	3	0

Last updated: 27 August 2021.
Source: Liga Portugal

==== Results by round ====
Round	1	2	3	4	5
Ground	H	A	H	A	H
Result	L	W	D	L	
Position	12	10	10	11	

Updated to match(es) played on 27 August 2021. Source: Liga Portugal
A = Away; H = Home; W = Win; D = Draw; L = Loss

==== Matches ====
7 August 2021 1	Marítimo	0–2	Braga	Funchal
20:30 WEST (UTC+1)		Report	Silva 60'; Horta 68'	Stadium: Estádio do Marítimo; Attendance: 1,782; Referee: André Narciso

16 August 2021 2	Belenenses SAD	1–2	Marítimo	Oeiras
21:15 WET (UTC±0)	Chima (yellow card) 41'; Ndour 45'; Phete (yellow card) 71'; Sithole (yellow card) 79'; Calila (yellow card) 90+4'	Report	Vidigal 13', (yellow card) 69'; Alipour 15', (yellow card) 64'; Vítor Costa (yellow card) 31'; Rossi (yellow card) 40'; Winck (yellow card) 89'	Stadium: Estádio Nacional; Attendance: 653; Referee: Claúdio Pereira

22 August 2021 3	Marítimo	1–1	Porto	Funchal
18:00 WEST (UTC+1)	Xadas 45+4'	Report	Díaz 35'	Stadium: Estádio do Marítimo; Attendance: 3,591; Referee: João Pinheiro

13 September 2021 5	Marítimo	2–2	Arouca	Funchal
19:00 WEST (UTC+1)	Vidigal (yellow card) 7' (yellow-red card) 87'; Ricardinho 35'; Xadas (yellow card) 36'; Alipour 45+11' (pen.); Rossi (yellow card) 49'; Vítor Costa (yellow card) 90+1'		Bukia 8'; L. Silva (yellow card) 36'; A. Silva (yellow card) 45+3', (goal) 82'; Araújo (yellow card) 47'; Basso (yellow card) 61'; Kouassi (yellow card) 85'; Dabbagh (yellow card) 90+5'	Stadium: Estádio do Marítimo; Attendance: 2,056; Referee: Manuel Oliveira

24 September 2021 7	Sporting CP	1–0	Marítimo	Lisbon
19:00 WEST (UTC+1)	Porro 90+8' (pen.)	Report		Stadium: Estádio José Alvalade; Attendance: 18,741; Referee: João Pinheiro

19 December 2021 15	Benfica	7–1	Marítimo	Lisbon
17:00 WET (UTC±0)	Núñez 3', 19' (yellow card) 7'; Gilberto 33'; Rafa 48'; Yaremchuk 56'; Ramos 86'; Seferovic 90+1'	Report	Rossi (yellow card) 16'; Costa (yellow card) 45+1'; Alipour 81'	Stadium: Estádio da Luz; Attendance: 27,814; Referee: António Nobre

15 January 2022 18	Braga	0–1	Marítimo	Braga
18:00 WET (UTC±0)		Report	Winck 89'	Stadium: Estádio Municipal de Braga; Referee: Gustavo Correia

30 January 2022 20	Porto	2–1	Marítimo	Porto
20:30 WET (UTC±0)	Evanilson 19'; Pepe 49'	Report	Costa 53'	Stadium: Estádio do Dragão; Referee: Fábio Melo

14 February 2022 22	Arouca	0–3	Marítimo	Arouca
20:15 WET (UTC±0)	Ba (yellow card) 18'; Arsénio (yellow card) 24'	Report	Alipour 9', 79', (yellow card) 79'; Tagueu 27'; Henrique (yellow card) 47' (yellow-red card) 56'; Costa (yellow card) 51'	Stadium: Estádio Municipal de Arouca; Attendance: 347; Referee: Miguel Nogueira

=== Taça de Portugal ===
17 October 2021 Third round	Varzim	2–2 (a.e.t.) (3–2 p)	Marítimo	Póvoa de Varzim
11:00 WEST (UTC+1)				Stadium: Estádio do Varzim Sport Club

=== Taça da Liga ===
25 July 2021 First round	Marítimo	0–1	Boavista	Funchal
18:00 WEST (UTC+01:00)		Report	Luís Santos 41'	Stadium: Estádio do Marítimo; Attendance: 1546; Referee: Manuel Oliveira
