= Juan Mosquera =

Juan Mosquera may refer to:

- Juan José Chaux Mosquera (1957–2021), Colombian lawyer, politician and diplomat
- Juan Carlos Mosquera (born 1982), Colombian footballer
- Juan Mosquera (footballer, born 1996), Colombian footballer
- Juan David Mosquera (born 2002), Colombian footballer
- Juan Mosquera (athlete) (born 1994), Panamanian athlete

== See also ==
- Juana Mosquera, athlete (born 1950)
