= João Gamboa =

Portuguese footballer (born 1996)

Personal information
- Full name: João Pedro da Costa Gamboa
- Date of birth: 31 August 1996 (age 30)
- Place of birth: Póvoa de Varzim, Portugal
- Height: 1.87 m (6 ft 2 in)
- Position: Defensive midfielder

Team information
- Current team: Jeonbuk Hyundai Motors
- Number: 16

Youth career
- 2007–2010: Rio Ave
- 2010–2012: Varzim
- 2012–2013: Benfica
- 2013–2014: Varzim
- 2014–2015: Braga

Senior career*
Years	Team	Apps	(Gls)
2014	Varzim B	4	(0)
2014	Varzim	1	(0)
2015–2017	Braga B	60	(1)
2015–2017	Braga	8	(0)
2017–2020	Marítimo	35	(1)
2018–2019	Marítimo B	4	(0)
2019–2020	→ Chaves (loan)	18	(0)
2020–2022	Estoril	63	(6)
2022–2023	OH Leuven	4	(0)
2023	→ Estoril (loan)	17	(0)
2023–2025	Pogoń Szczecin	61	(0)
2024	Pogoń Szczecin II	1	(0)
2025–	Jeonbuk Hyundai Motors	23	(0)

International career
2011–2012	Portugal U16	4	(0)
2012	Portugal U17	2	(0)
2015–2016	Portugal U20	6	(0)
2017	Portugal U21	1	(0)
- * Club domestic league appearances and goals as of 3 August 2026

João Pedro da Costa Gamboa (born 31 August 1996) is a Portuguese professional footballer who plays as a defensive midfielder for K League 1 club Jeonbuk Hyundai Motors.

== Club career ==
Born in Póvoa de Varzim, Gamboa was on the books of local clubs Rio Ave F.C. and Varzim S.C. as a youth, also having a year with S.L. Benfica. In 2014 he made his senior debut with Varzim's reserve team in the Porto Football Association's first division, and a sole first-team appearance in the third tier on 23 March in a 0–1 home loss against F.C. Tirsense.

Later in 2014, Gamboa signed for S.C. Braga, still as a junior. He made his professional debut for the reserves in the Segunda Liga on 19 April 2015 as an 80th-minute substitute for Nuno Valente, in a 1–0 away victory over S.C. Olhanense. On 23 May, in the last Primeira Liga round of the season, he played his first competitive match for the main squad as they won 5–0 at home to Vitória de Setúbal; he featured the last 15 minutes in place of Eder.

Gamboa was a regular for Braga's reserves the following campaign, scoring his first goal on 17 February 2016 to win 2–1 at home to S.C. Farense. On 29 June that year, he signed a five-year contract at fellow top-flight club C.S. Marítimo with teammate Rodrigo Pinho also making the move; several other players had already transferred in the opposite direction.

On 21 October 2017, Gamboa scored his first goal in the top tier to give Marítimo the lead at Setúbal, who came back to win 3–1. He was also sent off twice that season in away fixtures against Big Three teams: a second yellow card in the 39th minute of a 3–1 defeat at Porto, and a straight red card the following 3 March in a 5–0 loss to Benfica.

Gamboa spent 2019–20 on loan at G.D. Chaves in division two. At its conclusion, he signed for two years at G.D. Estoril Praia in the same competition. He scored six goals from 32 games in his first season for the champions, with the subsequent promotion.

Gamboa moved abroad for the first time aged 25, joining Oud-Heverlee Leuven of the Belgian Pro League on a three-year contract. In the 2023 January transfer window, he returned to his previous club on loan.

== International career ==
Gamboa represented Portugal at under-20 level, appearing in the 2016 Toulon Tournament. He won his only cap for the under-21 team on 10 October 2017, in a 3–1 away loss against Bosnia and Herzegovina in the 2019 UEFA European Championship qualifiers.

== Personal life ==
Gamboa's father Jorge was also a professional footballer who played as a winger. He too represented Braga.

== Honours ==
Estoril

- Liga Portugal 2: 2020–21

Jeonbuk Hyundai Motors

- K League 1: 2025
