= Rodrigo Rêgo =

Rodrigo Rêgo may refer to:

- Rodrigo Rêgo (footballer, born 2002), Portuguese football defender for Varzim
- Rodrigo Rêgo (footballer, born 2005), Portuguese football winger for Brighton & Hove Albion
