= Fábio Pacheco =

Portuguese footballer

Personal information
- Full name: Fábio José Ferreira Pacheco
- Date of birth: 26 May 1988 (age 38)
- Place of birth: Paredes, Portugal
- Height: 1.80 m (5 ft 11 in)
- Position: Defensive midfielder

Team information
- Current team: Marco 09
- Number: 6

Youth career
- 1996–2007: Paços Ferreira

Senior career*
Years	Team	Apps	(Gls)
2007–2012	Paços Ferreira	9	(0)
2007–2008	→ Rebordosa (loan)		
2009	→ Rebordosa (loan)	13	(2)
2009–2010	→ Rebordosa (loan)	11	(0)
2010–2011	→ Oliveirense (loan)	9	(0)
2011–2012	→ Tondela (loan)	34	(0)
2012–2015	Tondela	107	(8)
2015–2017	Vitória Setúbal	46	(2)
2017–2018	Marítimo	17	(1)
2018–2023	Moreirense	127	(2)
2023–2024	AVS	19	(1)
2024–2025	Varzim	21	(0)
2025–	Marco 09	16	(1)
- * Club domestic league appearances and goals as of 7 May 2026

Fábio José Ferreira Pacheco (born 26 May 1988) is a Portuguese footballer who plays as a defensive midfielder for Liga 3 club A.D. Marco 09.

He made 182 Primeira Liga appearances for Paços de Ferreira, Vitória de Setúbal, Marítimo and Moreirense, and also surpassed a century of appearances in the second tier for Oliveirense, Tondela and Moreirense, winning the title with the latter two clubs.

== Club career ==
=== Paços Ferreira ===
Born in Paredes, Porto District, Pacheco spent his entire youth career with F.C. Paços de Ferreira, and had three loans to Rebordosa A.C. of the fourth division. He made his professional and Primeira Liga debut on 10 May 2009 near the end of the season, as an 88th-minute substitute for Cristiano in a 2–1 home win against C.S. Marítimo.

In August 2010, Pacheco and teammate Carlitos were loaned to Segunda Liga side U.D. Oliveirense.

=== Tondela ===
In July 2011, Pacheco was loaned to C.D. Tondela for the upcoming campaign in the third-tier. After being promoted as runners-up to Varzim S.C. he rescinded his contract with his parent club and signed permanently.

Pacheco scored five goals in 2012–13, starting with a 2–0 home victory over F.C. Penafiel on 24 November 2012. He added a brace on 29 December, in a 3–1 defeat of C.S. Marítimo B also at the Estádio João Cardoso.

=== Vitória Setúbal ===
On 9 June 2015, having contributed 32 matches and three goals to another promotion as champions, Pacheco signed a two-year deal at top-flight Vitória F.C. under his former manager Quim Machado. In his second appearance, on 24 August, he was sent off in a 4–0 win at Académica de Coimbra, and on 18 September he received a straight red card in the first minute for conceding a penalty with a foul on Henrique Dourado which the Vitória S.C. player converted in the 2–2 draw at the Estádio do Bonfim.

Pacheco scored his first goal in the Portuguese top tier on 25 October 2015, to conclude a 2–0 win away to Moreirense FC.

=== Marítimo ===
Pacheco agreed to a three-year contract with Marítimo 10 June 2017, on a three-year deal as their first signing of the transfer window. On 21 October, away to his former employers, he was sent off in the 65th minute with his team winning 1–0, eventually falling 3–1. On 18 December, he scored the equaliser in a 3–1 loss away to eventual champions FC Porto.

Pacheco played precisely half of the Madeirans games that season (22 in all competitions), being suspended in March 2018 by chairman Carlos Pereira after an alleged subpar performance in the 5–0 defeat against S.L. Benfica.

=== Moreirense ===
On 6 June 2018, Pacheco signed a two-year deal with Moreirense, having rescinded his link to Marítimo. He was sent off again on his return to Setúbal on 3 August the following year, in the 35th minute of a 1–0 loss in the second round of the Taça da Liga. On 23 February 2020 he scored his first goal for the team from Moreira de Cónegos, the winner in a 2–1 home victory over C.D. Santa Clara.

In June 2021, with his contract due to expire, Pacheco renewed for two more years. The following 3 January, he played his 98th top-flight game for the club in a 2–1 loss at Tondela, thereby taking Jorge Duarte's record. That season ended with relegation, followed by instant return as champions, with the captain contributing one goal to the 3–0 home win against S.C.U. Torreense on 20 August 2022.

=== AVS ===
On 30 June 2023, Pacheco signed for AVS Futebol SAD, a new second-tier team founded as a merger between U.D. Vilafranquense and C.D. Aves.

== Honours ==
Tondela

- Segunda Liga: 2014–15

Moreirense

- Liga Portugal 2: 2022–23
