= André Teles =

Portuguese footballer (born 1997)

Personal information
- Full name: André António Rosário Teles
- Date of birth: 6 April 1997 (age 29)
- Place of birth: Funchal, Portugal
- Height: 1.82 m (6 ft 0 in)
- Position: Midfielder

Team information
- Current team: Camacha

Youth career
- 2006–2015: Marítimo

Senior career*
Years	Team	Apps	(Gls)
2015–2023	Marítimo B	135	(22)
2019–2023	Marítimo	6	(0)
2023	Oliveira Hospital	6	(0)
2023–	Camacha	44	(3)
- * Club domestic league appearances and goals as of 17:14, 18 April 2026 (UTC)

André António Rosário Teles (born 6 April 1997) is a Portuguese footballer who plays as a midfielder for Campeonato de Portugal club Camacha.

== Career ==
Teles was born in Funchal, Madeira, and spent his entire youth career with hometown giants C.S. Marítimo. On 13 October 2019, he made his first competitive appearance for the first team, in a 2–1 away loss to S.C. Braga in the group stage of the Taça da Liga. He played his first match in the Primeira Liga 17 days later, as a last-minute substitute for Edgar Costa in the 1–1 home draw against FC Porto.

On 3 August 2023, Marítimo announced that Teles' contract had been terminated by mutual agreement. Shortly after, he signed a one-year deal with Liga 3 club F.C. Oliveira do Hospital; however, in late November he moved down to the fourth division by joining A.D. Camacha.
