= Nandinho Andrade =

Portuguese footballer

Nandinho
Personal information
- Full name: Fernando Gabriel Silva Andrade
- Date of birth: 7 November 1996 (age 30)
- Place of birth: Santa Maria da Feira, Portugal
- Height: 1.75 m (5 ft 9 in)
- Position: Left-back

Team information
- Current team: Ovarense
- Number: 5

Youth career
- 2006–2015: Feirense

Senior career*
Years	Team	Apps	(Gls)
2015–2017	Feirense	2	(0)
2016	→ Gafanha (loan)	13	(0)
2016–2017	→ Sanjoanense (loan)	19	(1)
2017–2020	Marítimo B	55	(3)
2021	Salgueiros	9	(0)
2021–2022	Länk Vilaverdense	14	(2)
2022–2024	Lusitânia	52	(4)
2024–2025	Fafe	11	(1)
2025–2026	Marco 09	28	(2)
2026–	Ovarense	4	(0)
- * Club domestic league appearances and goals as of 13 September 2026

Fernando Gabriel Silva Andrade (born 7 November 1996) known as Nandinho, is a Portuguese professional footballer who plays as a left-back for Campeonato de Portugal club Ovarense.

== Career ==
On 2 August 2015, Nandinho made his professional debut with Feirense in a 2015–16 Taça da Liga match against Sporting Covilhã.
