= Filipe Oliveira =

Filipe Oliveira may refer to:

- Filipe Oliveira (footballer, born 1984), Portuguese footballer
- Filipe Oliveira (footballer, born 1994), Portuguese footballer
- Filipe Oliveira (footballer, born 1995), East Timorese footballer
