= Rúben Ferreira =

Portuguese footballer (born 1990)

Personal information
- Full name: Rúben Rafael de Sousa Ferreira
- Date of birth: 17 February 1990 (age 36)
- Place of birth: Funchal, Portugal
- Height: 1.83 m (6 ft 0 in)
- Position: Full-back

Youth career
- 1998–2000: Bom Sucesso
- 2000–2007: União Madeira
- 2007–2009: Marítimo

Senior career*
Years	Team	Apps	(Gls)
2008–2015	Marítimo B	60	(3)
2011–2016	Marítimo	108	(4)
2016–2017	Vitória Guimarães	15	(0)
2017	Vitória Guimarães B	2	(0)
2017	Chaves	4	(0)
2018–2020	Marítimo	44	(0)
2018–2019	Marítimo B	2	(0)
2022	Camacha	4	(0)
2022–2023	Covilhã	4	(0)
2023–2025	Estrela Calheta	28	(4)
Total		271	(11)

International career
2006	Portugal U16	5	(0)
2006	Portugal U17	2	(0)
2008	Portugal U18	2	(0)
2011–2012	Portugal U21	14	(0)
- * Club domestic league appearances and goals

Rúben Rafael de Sousa Ferreira (born 17 February 1990 in Funchal, Madeira) is a Portuguese former professional footballer who played as a full-back (especially on the left flank).
