= Filipe Oliveira (footballer, born 1994) =

Portuguese footballer

Personal information
- Full name: Filipe Santos Oliveira
- Date of birth: 21 April 1994 (age 32)
- Place of birth: Leiria, Portugal
- Height: 1.87 m (6 ft 1 1/2 in)
- Position: Midfielder

Team information
- Current team: Caldas
- Number: 24

Youth career
- 2003–2007: Leiria e Marrazes
- 2007–2012: União Leiria
- 2012–2013: Benfica

Senior career*
Years	Team	Apps	(Gls)
2012	União Leiria	4	(0)
2013	Benfica B	0	(0)
2013–2018	Marítimo B	132	(22)
2017–2018	Marítimo	11	(1)
2018–2019	Famalicão	20	(0)
2019–2021	Vilafranquense	29	(3)
2021–2022	Korona Kielce	40	(3)
2021–2022	Korona Kielce II	3	(0)
2023	Vitória Setúbal	14	(2)
2023–2025	Kotwica Kołobrzeg	57	(4)
2025–2026	Marinhense	13	(0)
2026–	Caldas	15	(1)

International career
2012	Portugal U18	3	(0)
2012	Portugal U19	2	(0)
2013	Portugal U20	1	(0)
- * Club domestic league appearances and goals as of 03:59, 27 August 2026 (UTC)

Filipe Santos Oliveira (born 21 April 1994) is a Portuguese professional footballer who plays as a midfielder for Liga 3 club Caldas.

== Club career ==
=== União Leiria ===
Born in Leiria, Oliveira joined local U.D. Leiria's youth ranks in 2007, aged 13. On 21 April 2012 he made his first-team (and Primeira Liga) debut, playing 15 minutes in a 3–2 away loss against Vitória de Guimarães on his 18th birthday. The following weekend, he was one of only eight players fielded – the club was immerse in a deep financial crisis – in a 0–4 home defeat to C.D. Feirense.

Oliveira was invited to a trial period with AFC Ajax in late May 2012. The Dutch side were impressed with his performance at the Copa Amsterdam where he was part of the under-19 squad, and subsequently invited him to a formal tryout, releasing him at its closure.

=== Benfica ===
Oliveira signed with S.L. Benfica in summer 2012. He spent one season with the juniors, winning the national championship.

Additionally, Oliveira had five bench appearances for the B team in the Segunda Liga, failing to receive any playing time.

=== Marítimo ===
On 24 July 2013, Oliveira moved to C.S. Marítimo B also in the second division. He scored two goals in 31 games in the 2014–15 campaign, suffering relegation.

Oliveira made his official debut for the first team on 20 August 2017, featuring the full 90 minutes in a 1–0 league home win over Boavista FC. He scored his only goal in the top flight the following 3 January, but in a 1–2 loss against G.D. Chaves also at the Estádio do Marítimo.

=== Famalicão ===
In July 2018, Oliveira signed a two-year contract at F.C. Famalicão of the second tier. He played mainly from the bench in his only season, in which they achieved promotion as runners-up after a quarter-century outside the main division.

=== Vilafranquense ===
On 12 July 2019, Oliveira joined fellow second-tier U.D. Vilafranquense on a two-year deal. He scored his first goal on 13 October, opening an eventual 3–2 home victory over U.D. Oliveirense.

=== Later career ===
Oliveira then represented two clubs in Poland. He achieved promotion to the Ekstraklasa with Korona Kielce in 2021–22.

Interspersed with this, Oliveira spent the second part of the 2022–23 season with Vitória de Setúbal in Liga 3.

== Career statistics ==
As of match played 13 April 2025

Appearances and goals by club, season and competition
Club	Season	League			National cup (Note: Includes Taça de Portugal, Polish Cup)		League cup (Note: Includes Taça da Liga)		Other		Total	
Club	Season	Division	Apps	Goals	Apps	Goals	Apps	Goals	Apps	Goals	Apps	Goals
União Leiria	2011–12	Primeira Liga	4	0	0	0	0	0	—		4	0
Benfica B	2012–13	Liga Portugal 2	0	0	—		—		—		0	0
Marítimo B	2013–14	Liga Portugal 2	30	2	—		—		—		30	2
Marítimo B	2014–15	Liga Portugal 2	31	2	—		—		—		31	2
Marítimo B	2015–16	Campeonato de Portugal	28	9	—		—		—		28	9
Marítimo B	2016–17	Campeonato de Portugal	32	8	—		—		—		32	8
Marítimo B	2017–18	Campeonato de Portugal	11	1	—		—		—		11	1
Marítimo B	Total		132	22	—		—		—		132	22
Marítimo	2017–18	Primeira Liga	11	1	2	0	2	0	—		15	1
Famalicão	2018–19	Liga Portugal 2	20	0	0	0	1	0	—		21	0
Vilafranquense	2019–20	Liga Portugal 2	20	3	0	0	1	0	—		21	3
Vilafranquense	2020–21	Liga Portugal 2	9	0	0	0	—		—		9	0
Vilafranquense	Total		29	3	0	0	1	0	—		30	3
Korona Kielce	2020–21	I liga	16	1	—		—		—		16	1
Korona Kielce	2021–22	I liga	23	2	2	0	—		1 (Note: Appearance in I liga promotion play-offs)	0	26	2
Korona Kielce	2022–23	Ekstraklasa	0	0	0	0	—		—		0	0
Korona Kielce	Total		39	3	2	0	—		1	0	42	3
Korona Kielce II	2022–23	III liga, group IV	3	0	—		—		—		3	0
Vitória Setúbal	2022–23	Liga 3	14	2	0	0	—		—		14	2
Kotwica Kołobrzeg	2023–24	II liga	31	4	2	0	—		—		33	4
Kotwica Kołobrzeg	2024–25	I liga	26	0	0	0	—		—		26	0
Kotwica Kołobrzeg	Total		57	4	2	0	—		—		59	4
Career total			309	35	6	0	4	0	1	0	320	35
