= Diederrick Joel Tagueu =

Cameroonian footballer (born 1993)

Joel Tagueu
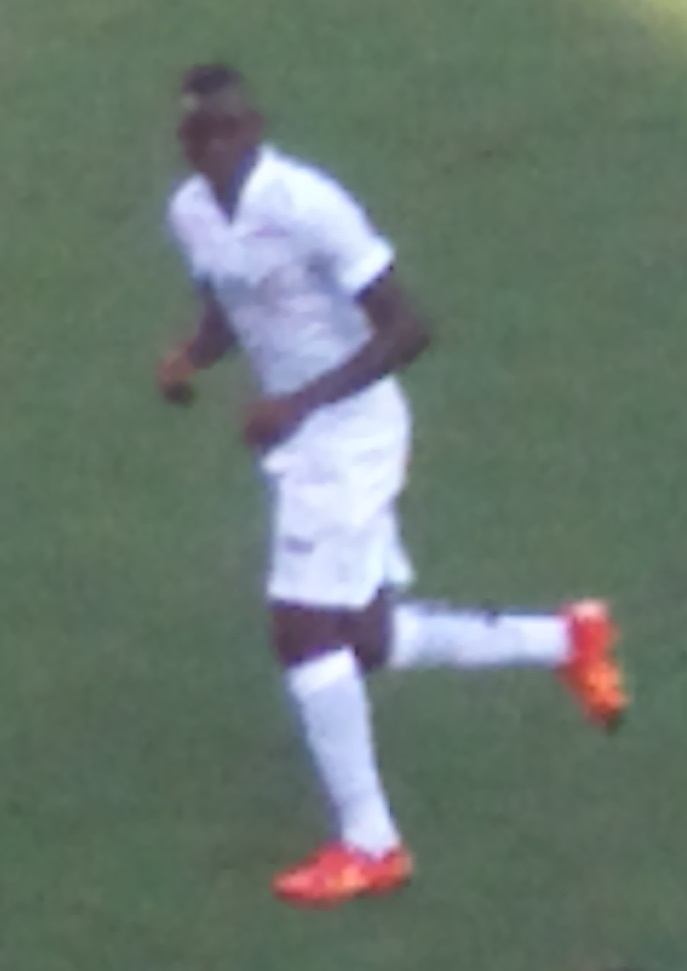
- Joel playing for Santos in 2016

Personal information
- Full name: Diederrick Joel Tagueu-Tadjo
- Date of birth: 6 December 1993 (age 32)
- Place of birth: Nkongsamba, Cameroon
- Height: 1.78 m (5 ft 10 in)
- Position: Striker

Team information
- Current team: Haiphong
- Number: 95

Youth career
- 2009–2011: Iraty
- 2011–2012: Londrina

Senior career*
Years	Team	Apps	(Gls)
2012–2014	Londrina	28	(10)
2014	→ Coritiba (loan)	20	(8)
2015–2020	Cruzeiro	23	(3)
2016	→ Santos (loan)	28	(5)
2017	→ Botafogo (loan)	8	(1)
2017	→ Avaí (loan)	21	(3)
2018–2019	→ Marítimo (loan)	45	(17)
2020	→ Marítimo (loan)	16	(2)
2020–2023	Marítimo	72	(19)
2023	→ Al-Hazem (loan)	15	(7)
2023–2024	Hanoi	22	(7)
2024–2025	Paysandu	5	(0)
2025	Nacional	14	(2)
2025–	Haiphong	27	(15)

International career^{‡}
2011	Cameroon U20	3	(0)
2018–2019	Cameroon	6	(1)
- * Club domestic league appearances and goals as of 31 October 2026 ‡ National team caps and goals as of 28 October 2019

Diederrick Joel Tagueu-Tadjo (born 6 December 1993), known as Joel Tagueu or simply Joel, is a Cameroonian professional footballer who plays as a striker for V.League 1 club Haiphong.

== Club career ==
=== Londrina ===
Born in Nkongsamba, Joel moved to Brazil in September 2009, joining Iraty's youth setup. In March 2011 he moved to neighbouring Londrina (which also had the same owner, Sérgio Malucelli), and was promoted to the first-team in 2012, after impressing in the youth squads.

Joel made his first-team debut on 28 March 2012, coming on as a late substitute in a 0–1 away loss against Coritiba, for the Campeonato Paranaense championship. He scored his first goal four days later, netting his side's only in a 1–1 home draw against Toledo Colônia Work.

In the 2014 season, Joel played an important role in Londrina's Paranaense winning campaign, and also scored regularly for the side in Série D. On 31 July 2014, he scored a brace in a 2–1 home success against Santos, for the campaign's Copa do Brasil.

==== Coritiba (loan) ====
On 4 September 2014, Joel was loaned to Coritiba for the remainder of the season, being subsequently negotiated with a German unnamed team. He made his Série A debut three days later, again from the bench in a 0–0 away draw against Bahia.

Joel scored his first goal in the Brazilian top flight on 10 September, netting the last of a 3–0 home success against Chapecoense. Seven days later he scored a brace in a 3–1 home win against São Paulo, but fell into a hole into the locker room tunnel after going out to celebrate the last goal.

=== Cruzeiro ===
On 16 December 2014, Joel moved to fellow league team Cruzeiro, for a R$2.5 million fee. He made his debut for the club on 1 February of the following year, scoring the winner in an away success over Democrata-GV.

Joel was bought outright by Raposa in May 2015. However, he struggled with injuries during the campaign, and appeared in only 11 league matches, scoring one goal.

==== Loan spells ====
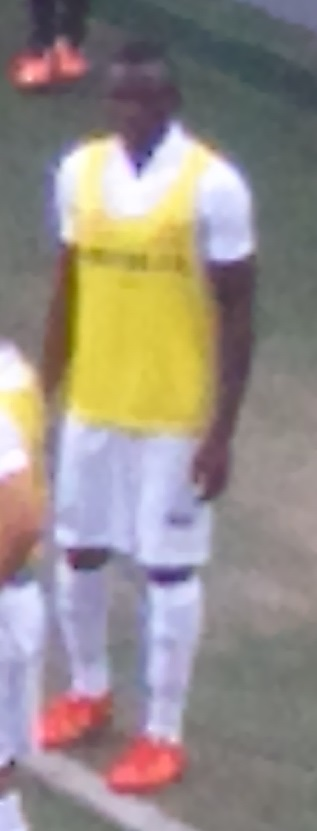
Joel warming up for Santos in 2016

On 11 January 2016, Joel was loaned to fellow league team Santos, for one year. He made his debut for the club on 30 January, coming on as a second-half substitute in a 1–1 Campeonato Paulista home draw against São Bernardo.

On 19 January 2017, Joel signed a one-year loan contract with Botafogo.

On 20 June 2017, Joel signed a loan contract until the end of the year with Avaí.

On 8 January 2018, Joel was sent on a season-long loan to Portuguese Primeira Liga club Marítimo.

==== Return ====
In June 2019 he suffered a heart problem.

In October 2019, Joel rejoined Cruzeiro and started to train with the team squad.

=== Marítimo ===
On 7 August 2020, Joel signed a two-year contract with Marítimo.

=== Al-Hazem ===
On 18 January 2023, Joel joined Saudi club Al-Hazem on loan.

=== Hanoi FC ===
On 11 September 2023, V.League 1 side Hanoi FC confirmed they had signed Joel for a reported transfer fee of €800,000. Joel made his debut for Hanoi in the AFC Champions League against Pohang Steelers on 20 September, where he scored a brace. On 29 October, he made his V.League 1 debut and scored a hat-trick against Haiphong FC.

=== Nacional ===
On 1 January 2025, Joel joined Liga Portugal side Nacional on a free transfer from Paysandu a team that competes in the Campeonato Brasileiro Série B. He made his debut for Nacional on 19 January 2025 at the 46th minute for Isaac against AVS

== International career ==
Joel was ruled out of the 2019 Africa Cup of Nations due to a heart defect.

== Career statistics ==
=== Club ===
As of match played 7 July 2024

Appearances and goals by club, season and competition
Club	Season	League			State league		National cup (Note: Includes Copa do Brasil and Taça de Portugal)		League cup (Note: Includes Taça da Liga)		Continental		Total	
Club	Season	Division	Apps	Goals	Apps	Goals	Apps	Goals	Apps	Goals	Apps	Goals	Apps	Goals
Londrina	2012	—			6 (Note: Appearance(s) in Campeonato Paranaense)	1	—		—		—		6	1
Londrina	2013	Série D	2	0	5	2	—		—		—		7	2
Londrina	2014	Série D	5	3	10	4	6	2	—		—		21	9
Londrina	Total		7	3	21	7	6	2	0	0	0	0	34	12
Coritiba (loan)	2014	Série A	20	8	0	0	0	0	—		—		20	8
Cruzeiro	2015	Série A	11	1	8 (Note: Appearance(s) in Campeonato Mineiro)	2	0	0	—		5 (Note: Appearance(s) in Copa Libertadores)	0	24	3
Cruzeiro	2019	Série A	4	0	0	0	0	0	—		0	0	4	0
Cruzeiro	Total		15	1	8	2	0	0	0	0	5	0	28	3
Santos (loan)	2016	Série A	16	2	12 (Note: Appearance(s) in Campeonato Paulista)	3	7	2	—		—		35	7
Botafogo (loan)	2017	Série A	3	0	5 (Note: Appearance(s) in Campeonato Carioca)	1	0	0	—		2	0	10	1
Avaí (loan)	2017	Série A	21	3	0	0	0	0	—		—		21	3
Marítimo (loan)	2017–18	Primeira Liga	15	9	—		0	0	0	0	0	0	15	9
Marítimo (loan)	2018–19	Primeira Liga	30	8	—		1	0	3	2	—		34	10
Marítimo (loan)	Total		45	17	0	0	1	0	3	2	0	0	49	19
Marítimo (loan)	2019–20	Primeira Liga	16	2	—		0	0	0	0	—		16	2
Marítimo	2020–21	Primeira Liga	32	9	—		4	1	—		—		36	10
Marítimo	2021–22	Primeira Liga	24	9	—		0	0	1	0	—		25	9
Marítimo	2022–23	Primeira Liga	14	1	—		1	0	3	0	—		18	1
Marítimo	2023–24	Liga Portugal 2	2	0	—		0	0	1	0	—		3	0
Marítimo	Total		72	19	0	0	5	1	5	0	0	0	82	20
Al-Hazem (loan)	2022–23	First Division League	15	7	—		—		—		—		15	7
Hanoi FC	2023–24	V.League 1	22	7	—		3	3	—		4 (Note: Appearance(s) in AFC Champions League)	2	29	12
Career total			252	69	46	13	22	8	8	2	11	2	339	94

=== International ===
As of match played 14 June 2019

Appearances and goals by national team and year
National team	Year	Apps	Goals
Cameroon	2018	3	0
Cameroon	2019	3	1
Total		6	1

Scores and results list Cameroon's goal tally first.

No.	Date	Venue	Opponent	Score	Result	Competition
1.	9 June 2019	Estadio Cerro del Espino, Majadahonda, Spain	Zambia	2–0	2–1	Friendly

== Honours ==
Londrina

- Campeonato Paranaense: 2014

Santos

- Campeonato Paulista: 2016
