= Dudu (footballer, born 2002) =

Brazilian footballer

Personal information
- Full name: Eduardo Kempf Schwade
- Date of birth: 28 September 2002 (age 24)
- Place of birth: Feliz, Brazil
- Height: 1.82 m (6 ft 0 in)
- Position: Left back

Team information
- Current team: Marco 09
- Number: 36

Youth career
- 2011–2022: Juventude

Senior career*
Years	Team	Apps	(Gls)
2022–2023	Juventude	2	(0)
2022	→ Londrina (loan)	5	(0)
2023–2024	Ittihad Kalba	7	(0)
2024	CA Fénix	19	(4)
2026	Pouso Alegre	3	(1)
2026–	Marco 09	0	(0)
- * Club domestic league appearances and goals as of 12 September 2026

Eduardo Kempf Schwade (born 28 September 2002), commonly known as Dudu, is a Brazilian footballer who plays as a left back for Portuguese Liga 3 club Marco 09.

== Club career ==
Born in Feliz, Rio Grande do Sul, Dudu joined Juventude's youth team in 2011, aged nine. On 12 July 2021, he renewed his contract with the club until the end of 2023.

Dudu made his first team debut on 26 January 2022, coming on as a late substitute for Capixaba in a 2–1 Campeonato Gaúcho home loss against Internacional. On 5 April, after featuring rarely, he was loaned to Série B side Londrina until the end of the year.

After only 56 minutes of action in five matches, Dudu's loan was cut short in July 2022, and he returned to Juventude. He made his Série A debut on 9 November, starting in a 2–2 home draw against Flamengo.

== Career statistics ==
As of 10 November 2022

Club	Season	League			State League		Cup		Continental		Other		Total	
Club	Season	Division	Apps	Goals	Apps	Goals	Apps	Goals	Apps	Goals	Apps	Goals	Apps	Goals
Juventude	2022	Série A	1	0	3	0	0	0	—		—		4	0
Londrina (loan)	2022	Série B	5	0	—		—		—		—		5	0
Career total			6	0	3	0	0	0	0	0	0	0	9	0
