= André Mesquita =

Portuguese footballer

Personal information
- Full name: André Filipe Rebelo Mesquita
- Date of birth: 10 October 1997 (age 29)
- Place of birth: Porto, Portugal
- Height: 1.70 m (5 ft 7 in)
- Position: Winger

Team information
- Current team: União de Lamas

Youth career
- 2006–2007: Sporting CP
- 2007–2009: CD Portugal
- 2009–2010: Alfenense
- 2010–2012: Boavista
- 2012–2016: FC Porto
- 2012–2013: → Padroense (youth loan)

Senior career*
| Years | Team | Apps | (Gls) |
| 2016–2017 | FC Porto B | 0 | (0) |
| 2016–2017 | → Fafe (loan) | 3 | (0) |
| 2017 | Aliança de Gandra | 13 | (4) |
| 2017–2018 | Dunărea Călărași | 2 | (0) |
| 2018 | Canelas | 5 | (3) |
| 2018–2020 | Marítimo B | 48 | (17) |
| 2020 | Marítimo | 1 | (0) |
| 2020–2023 | Santa Clara | 0 | (0) |
| 2021 | → Mafra (loan) | 4 | (0) |
| 2021–2022 | → Vitória Setúbal (loan) | 8 | (2) |
| 2023 | Salgueiros | 5 | (0) |
| 2023– | União de Lamas | 0 | (0) |

International career
| 2013 | Portugal U16 | 2 | (2) |
| 2013 | Portugal U17 | 3 | (0) |
- * Club domestic league appearances and goals as of 13:46, 24 October 2023 (UTC)

André Filipe Rebelo Mesquita (born 10 October 1997) is a Portuguese professional footballer who plays as a winger for União de Lamas.

== Club career ==
On 17 September 2016, Mesquita made his professional debut with Fafe in a 2016–17 LigaPro match against Penafiel.
