= Tiago Martins (footballer, born 1998) =

Portuguese footballer

Personal information
- Full name: Tiago Filipe Fernandes Martins
- Date of birth: 28 September 1998 (age 28)
- Place of birth: Tavira, Portugal
- Height: 1.85 m (6 ft 1 in)
- Position: Goalkeeper

Team information
- Current team: Marco 09
- Number: 64

Youth career
- 2006–2011: Ginásio Tavira
- 2011–2013: Olhanense
- 2013–2014: Padroense
- 2014–2015: Porto
- 2015–2016: Belenenses

Senior career*
Years	Team	Apps	(Gls)
2016–2017	Vilafranquense	24	(0)
2017–2019	Vitória Guimarães B	18	(0)
2020–2021	Vilafranquense	16	(0)
2021–2022	Huesca B	5	(0)
2022–2023	Amora	4	(0)
2022–2023	→ Moncarapachense (loan)	19	(0)
2023–2024	Louletano	13	(0)
2024–2025	Anadia	42	(0)
2025–2026	Fafe	19	(0)
2026–	Marco 09	5	(0)

International career
2013	Portugal U16	2	(0)
- * Club domestic league appearances and goals as of 12 September 2026

Tiago Filipe Fernandes Martins (born 28 September 1998) is a Portuguese footballer who plays for Liga 3 club Marco 09 as a goalkeeper.

== Football career ==
On 13 May 2018, Martins made his professional debut with Vitória Guimarães B in a 2017–18 LigaPro match against Nacional.

On 4 August 2021, Martins signed for Spanish club SD Huesca B.
