= Diogo Firmino =

Portuguese footballer (born 1996)

Personal information
- Full name: Diogo Firmino da Silva Fernandes
- Date of birth: 14 November 1996 (age 29)
- Place of birth: Funchal, Portugal
- Height: 1.74 m (5 ft 9 in)
- Position: Attacking midfielder

Team information
- Current team: Aliança Gandra

Youth career
- 2004–2008: Marítimo
- 2008–2009: Sporting CP
- 2009–2013: Nacional
- 2013–2014: Reading
- 2014–2015: União Madeira

Senior career*
Years	Team	Apps	(Gls)
2015–2017	União Madeira	6	(1)
2016	→ Praiense (loan)	3	(0)
2016–2017	→ Trofense (loan)	28	(4)
2017–2021	Marítimo B	57	(3)
2021–2023	Canelas	29	(0)
2023–2024	Paredes	13	(0)
2024	Camacha	8	(0)
2024–2026	Vila Meã	50	(15)
2026–	Aliança Gandra	13	(4)
- * Club domestic league appearances and goals as of 21:29, 7 October 2026 (UTC)

Diogo Firmino da Silva Fernandes (born 14 November 1996 in Funchal, Madeira), known as Firmino, is a Portuguese footballer who plays as an attacking midfielder for Aliança de Gandra.
