= Ricardo Valente =

Portuguese footballer (born 1991)

Personal information
- Full name: Ricardo Jorge Oliveira Valente
- Date of birth: 3 April 1991 (age 35)
- Place of birth: Porto, Portugal
- Height: 1.81 m (5 ft 11 in)
- Position: Forward

Youth career
- 2001–2006: Porto
- 2006–2010: Leixões

Senior career*
Years	Team	Apps	(Gls)
2010–2011	Esmoriz	23	(2)
2011–2012	Aliados Lordelo	24	(7)
2012–2013	Fafe	27	(5)
2013–2014	Feirense	30	(1)
2014–2015	Leixões	18	(9)
2015–2017	Vitória Guimarães	48	(13)
2016–2017	→ Paços Ferreira (loan)	27	(4)
2017–2019	Marítimo	44	(9)
2019	Marítimo B	1	(0)
2019–2020	Hatta	11	(2)
2020	Tondela	11	(0)
2020–2021	Gaz Metan Mediaș	31	(10)
2021–2022	Tuzlaspor	6	(0)
2022	Ionikos	2	(0)
2022	Mioveni	0	(0)
2022–2026	Leixões	81	(18)
Total		384	(80)
- * Club domestic league appearances and goals

Ricardo Jorge Oliveira Valente (born 3 April 1991) is a Portuguese former professional footballer who played as a forward.

== Club career ==
Born in Porto, Valente spent his first years as a senior in the lower leagues. In summer 2013 he signed for C.D. Feirense in the Segunda Liga, making his debut as a professional on 27 July by starting in a 3–1 away loss against G.D. Chaves in the first round of the Taça da Liga. He scored his first league goal on 23 November, contributing to a 1–1 draw at Sporting CP B after entering the field as a late substitute.

Valente joined Leixões S.C. of the same tier in the 2014 off-season, quickly excelling to become one of the Matosinhos side's top scorers. In the following transfer window, he moved to Vitória de Guimarães.

Valente's first game in the Primeira Liga occurred on 10 January 2015, as he played 33 minutes of the 3–0 away defeat to S.L. Benfica. He found the net in the next match, a 4–0 home win over Académica de Coimbra, and finished the campaign with 17 league goals between Leixões and Vitória.

On 31 August 2016, Valente joined F.C. Paços de Ferreira on a season-long loan deal. The following 12 July, he signed a permanent two-year contract with C.S. Marítimo.

In March 2019, it was confirmed that Valente would not appear in any more matches for the Madeira club after having subject to disciplinary proceedings; president Carlos Pereira commented that the player had an "irreverent temper", this not being the first time he had been internally suspended.

Subsequently, Valente represented in quick succession Hatta Club (UAE Pro League), C.D. Tondela, CS Gaz Metan Mediaș (Romanian Liga I), Tuzlaspor (TFF First League), Ionikos F.C. (Super League Greece) and CS Mioveni (Romanian top division). In August 2022, the 31-year-old returned to Leixões after seven years.
