= Erdem Şen =

Belgian footballer

Personal information
- Date of birth: 5 January 1989 (age 37)
- Place of birth: Brussels, Belgium
- Height: 1.80 m (5 ft 11 in)
- Position: Midfielder

Youth career
- RWDM

Senior career*
Years	Team	Apps	(Gls)
- Grasshopper Club Zurich U-21
2008–2010	FC Kreuzlingen	16	(0)
2010–2011	ROCCM	18	(1)
2011	R.C.S. Verviétois	8	(1)
2011–2012	Giresunspor	7	(0)
2012–2014	Samsunspor	55	(4)
2014–2016	Gaziantepspor	50	(5)
2016–2018	Marítimo	41	(2)
2018–2019	Ankaragücü	0	(0)
2019	Chaves	6	(0)
2020	İstanbulspor	2	(1)
- * Club domestic league appearances and goals

Erdem Şen (born 5 January 1989) is a Belgian former professional footballer who played as a midfielder.

== Career ==
Born in Brussels, Belgium, he is a RWDM youth product, playing for the club from the age of 5 to 18. He then joined Grasshopper Club Zurich U-21

In November 2011 he moved to R.C.S. Verviétois.

On 18 August 2016, he signed with Marítimo.
