= Grasshopper Club Zurich U-21 =

Swiss association football team

Grasshopper Club Zürich U-21
- Full name: Grasshopper Club Zürich U-21
- Short name: GC U21; GCZ U21
- Ground: GC/Campus
- Capacity: 583
- Manager: Gernot Messner
- League: 1. Liga Classic
- Website: gcz.ch
| Home colours | Away colours | Third colours |

Grasshopper Club Zürich U-21 is the under-21 team of Swiss football club Grasshopper Club Zürich. Based at the club's GC/Campus in Niederhasli, Canton of Zürich, the team competes in the 1. Liga Classic, the fourth tier of Swiss football. It forms part of the club's youth development structure and provides a pathway for young players progressing towards the first team.

== History ==
Grasshopper U-21 is part of the club's youth performance centre, which includes teams from under-15 to under-21 level. The club's youth development programme aims to support players' sporting and personal development and prepare them for progression through the club's football structure.

The U21 team also plays a role in the transition of academy players towards senior football. Upon his appointment in October 2025, head coach Gernot Messner was given a contract until the summer of 2027. The club stated that his appointment was intended to strengthen cooperation between the U21 side and the first team and further develop the club's playing philosophy across its teams.

=== 2024–25 season ===
During the 2024–25 season, under head coach Nikola Marunic, Grasshopper U-21 competed in Group 2 of the 1. Liga Classic. The team finished first in the group with 64 points from 30 matches, recording 19 wins, seven draws and four defeats, with 71 goals scored and 27 conceded.

Having secured qualification for the promotion play-offs, Grasshopper defeated Meyrin FC 2–1 in the second leg of their qualifying tie, advancing with a 3–2 aggregate victory. The team subsequently faced FC Kreuzlingen in the final round for promotion to the Swiss Promotion League. After losing the first leg 1–0 at GC/Campus, Grasshopper took a 2–1 lead in the return match but conceded twice in stoppage time, losing 3–2 and 4–2 on aggregate.

=== 2025–26 season ===
Grasshopper U-21 finished first in Group 2 of the 1. Liga Classic for the second consecutive season. The team collected 60 points from 30 matches, recording 19 wins, three draws and eight defeats, with 69 goals scored and 35 conceded.

In the promotion play-offs, the team faced FC Amical Saint-Prex. After a 1–1 draw in the first leg, the tie remained undecided after the return match and was settled by a penalty shoot-out, in which Saint-Prex prevailed 6–5. Grasshopper consequently missed promotion to the Swiss Promotion League for the second successive season.

=== 2026–27 season ===
Grasshopper U-21 continued to compete in Group 2 of the 1. Liga Classic during the 2026–27 season.

== Stadium and grounds ==
The team plays its home matches at GC/Campus in Niederhasli, Canton of Zürich. The facility serves as the training and development centre for the club's elite football teams, from under-15 level through to the first team. It also houses accommodation for youth players and the offices of Grasshopper Fussball AG.

The campus includes a main natural-grass pitch measuring 105 by 68 metres, with a covered stand containing 583 seats. The facility also has two additional natural-grass pitches, two full-sized artificial-turf pitches and a smaller artificial-turf training area.

== Honours ==
- 1. Liga Classic – Group 2
  - Winners (2): 2024–25, 2025–26

== Coaching staff ==
In January 2023, former Albania international Burim Kukeli was appointed head coach of the U21 team, replacing Goran Ivelj, who had been at the club for more than four years. Sero Noka joined the coaching staff as assistant coach.

In July 2023, Kukeli was promoted to the first-team coaching staff, while Noka succeeded him as head coach of the U21 side.

| Position | Name |
|---|---|
| Head coach | Gernot Messner |
| Assistant coach | Oliver Buff |

== See also ==
- Grasshopper Club Zürich
- 1. Liga Classic
- Swiss Promotion League
