= Cristiano Gomes (footballer, born 1994) =

Portuguese footballer (born 1994)

Personal information
- Full name: Cristiano Castro Gomes
- Date of birth: 5 August 1994 (age 32)
- Place of birth: Funchal, Portugal
- Height: 1.85 m (6 ft 1 in)
- Position: Right-back

Team information
- Current team: AD Camacha

Youth career
- 2003–2009: Marítimo
- 2009: CD Barreirense
- 2009–2010: Coruja
- 2010–2011: CD Barreirense
- 2011–2013: Marítimo

Senior career*
Years	Team	Apps	(Gls)
2014–2015	Marítimo C	30	(0)
2015–2020	Marítimo B	77	(0)
2017–2021	Marítimo	1	(0)
2021	Cova da Piedade	9	(0)
2021–2022	Olympias Lympion	26	(1)
2022–2023	AD Camacha	24	(2)
2023	Lusitânia	6	(0)
2023–	AD Camacha	0	(0)
- * Club domestic league appearances and goals as of 18:28, 7 December 2023 (UTC)

Cristiano Castro Gomes (born 5 August 1994) is a Portuguese professional footballer who plays as a right-back for Campeonato de Portugal club AD Camacha.

== Career ==
On 1 September 2017, Gomes made his professional debut with Marítimo in a 2017–18 Taça da Liga match against Estoril Praia.
