= 2026–27 1. Liga Classic =

1. Liga Classic
- Season: 2026–27
- Dates: 8 August 2026 –
- Matches: 334
- Goals: 1,106 (3.31 per match)
- Biggest home win: Prishtina Bern 6–0 Servette U-21 (29 August 2026); Baden 6–0 Widnau (24 October 2026)
- Biggest away win: Vevey-Sports 0–4 Meyrin (8 August 2026); Thun Berner Oberland U-21 1–5 Schötz (26 September 2026); Wohlen 1–5 Schötz (30 September 2026); CS Chênois 0–4 Vevey-Sports (3 October 2026); Echallens Région 0–4 Prishtina Bern (24 October 2026); Thalwil 0–4 Widnau (7 November 2026)
- Highest scoring: Thun Berner Oberland U-21 5–6 Muttenz (10 October 2026)
- Longest winning run: 9 matches USI Azzurri
- Longest unbeaten run: 10 matches Taverne
- Longest winless run: 13 matches Münsingen
- Longest losing run: 6 matches Vevey-Sports
- All statistics correct as of 15 November 2026.

The 2026–27 1. Liga Classic is the 105th season of the 1. Liga Classic, the fourth tier of the Swiss football league system.

== League tables ==
=== Group 1 ===
Pos	Team	Pld	W	D	L	GF	GA	GD	Pts	Qualification
1	Prishtina Bern	14	10	3	1	39	12	+27	33	Advance to the promotion play-offs
2	USI Azzurri	14	11	0	3	34	15	+19	33	Advance to the promotion play-offs
3	Portalban/Gletterens	14	8	2	4	25	16	+9	26	Possible promotion play-offs
4	Servette U-21	14	7	3	4	25	25	0	24	
5	Monthey	14	6	5	3	24	20	+4	23	
6	Lausanne-Sport U-21	14	6	4	4	24	16	+8	22	
7	Sion U-21	14	6	4	4	19	19	0	22	
8	Naters Oberwallis	14	6	2	6	26	33	−7	20	
9	Coffrane	14	4	5	5	18	18	0	17	
10	CS Chênois	14	5	2	7	24	25	−1	17	
11	Lancy	14	5	1	8	24	26	−2	16	
12	La Chaux-de-Fonds	14	5	1	8	17	34	−17	16	
13	Echallens Région	14	4	3	7	21	30	−9	15	
14	Meyrin	14	4	2	8	22	24	−2	14	
15	Stade-Payerne	14	3	3	8	21	32	−11	12	Relegated to the 2027–28 2. Liga Interregional
16	Vevey-Sports	14	2	0	12	19	37	−18	6	Relegated to the 2027–28 2. Liga Interregional

Updated to match(es) played on 15 November 2026. Source: Erste Liga

==== Results ====
Home \ Away	AZZ	PRI	SFM	LSL	SIM	PGT	MON	NAT	LAN	ECH	MEY	CHE	PAY	LCF	COF	VEV
USI Azzurri	—	1–2								6–1		1–0		6–1	3–0	4–2
Prishtina Bern		—	6–0			2–1	1–2	4–0			5–1		4–1			
Servette U-21	2–1		—	0–3			2–3		3–1	2–2		2–1		2–0	1–2	
Lausanne-Sport U-21	0–1	1–1		—			1–1	5–2		3–1	1–1			4–0		
Sion U-21		1–1	0–0	1–1	—	2–1	1–2	3–1			2–1		2–0			
Portalban/Gletterens	2–0		1–2	1–2		—			1–1	2–1		1–1		2–1	3–2	4–1
Monthey	1–2					0–1	—	3–1	1–2	1–1				2–2		
Naters Oberwallis	1–3					1–2		—	2–1							
Lancy	2–3			2–0	1–3				—	2–0		2–4		5–1	0–1	2–1
Echallens Région		0–4			4–0			3–4		—	2–1	2–1		3–0	1–1	
Meyrin	0–1		1–2				0–0	1–2	3–2		—		6–2			
CS Chênois		1–1		2–1	2–0		2–3	3–4			3–1	—	3–1			0–4
Stade-Payerne	1–2		3–3	0–2		0–3		3–3	3–1	3–0			—	1–2	0–0	
La Chaux-de-Fonds		1–4			3–1			1–2			2–1			—		1–0
Coffrane		0–1			1–1		2–2	1–1			0–1	2–1		1–2	—	5–1
Vevey-Sports		2–3	1–4	3–0	1–2		2–3	0–2			0–4		1–3			—

Updated to match(es) played on 15 November 2026. Source: Erste Liga
Legend: Blue = home team win; Yellow = draw; Red = away team win.

=== Group 2 ===
Pos	Team	Pld	W	D	L	GF	GA	GD	Pts	Qualification
1	Langenthal	14	9	3	2	35	24	+11	30	Advance to the promotion play-offs
2	Schötz	14	9	2	3	40	23	+17	29	Advance to the promotion play-offs
3	Courtételle	14	7	3	4	27	19	+8	24	Possible promotion play-offs
4	Delémont	14	6	4	4	20	13	+7	22	
5	Muttenz	14	6	4	4	26	21	+5	22	
6	Solothurn	14	6	3	5	33	27	+6	21	
7	Wohlen	14	6	3	5	17	18	−1	21	
8	Buochs	14	5	3	6	23	25	−2	18	
9	Muri-Gümligen	14	5	3	6	14	20	−6	18	
10	Concordia Basel	14	5	2	7	24	22	+2	17	
11	Thun Berner Oberland U-21	13	4	4	5	30	30	0	16	
12	Grasshopper Club U-21	13	5	1	7	19	22	−3	16	
13	Black Stars Basel	14	3	7	4	14	18	−4	16	
14	Zug 94	14	5	1	8	23	36	−13	16	
15	Bassecourt	14	4	3	7	19	29	−10	15	Relegated to the 2027–28 2. Liga Interregional
16	Münsingen	14	1	4	9	13	30	−17	7	Relegated to the 2027–28 2. Liga Interregional

Updated to match(es) played on 15 November 2026. Source: Erste Liga

==== Results ====
Home \ Away	LAN	SCH	COU	CON	DEL	MUT	SOL	GZM	BUO	MUR	THU	WOH	ZUG	BAS	BLS	MÜN
Langenthal	—	3–2	4–1		0–0	2–1		2–3					6–2			
Schötz		—	3–2		1–0		3–2		0–1	4–1				4–1	3–1	
Courtételle			—		0–0		1–3		3–3	2–0	5–2	0–0		0–1		4–0
Concordia Basel	2–3	2–2		—		0–3		5–2					3–0			
Delémont				2–1	—		5–3	0–2	4–0	3–0	2–1			2–1		
Muttenz		2–0	1–3		0–0	—	1–1		3–1	0–1		0–1			2–2	
Solothurn	2–3			0–2			—	2–3			3–1		4–1	2–2		3–0
Grasshopper Club U-21			1–3			1–2		—	0–1				1–2		1–2	
Buochs	1–2			1–0			3–5		—	2–0				5–1		1–1
Muri-Gümligen	3–4			2–3			0–0	2–0		—	1–1					1–0
Thun Berner Oberland U-21	2–2	1–5		2–1		5–6					—	1–1	6–1			4–1
Wohlen	2–2	1–5		2–0	2–1			0–1	2–1	1–2		—	3–2			
Zug 94		3–5	1–2		1–0				2–2	0–1			—		3–0	
Bassecourt	0–1			2–1		3–3		0–3			0–2	2–1	2–3	—		3–1
Black Stars Basel			0–1	0–0	1–1		2–3		2–1	0–0	2–2	1–0		1–1	—	
Münsingen	3–1	3–3		1–4		1–2		1–1				0–1	1–2		0–0	—

Updated to match(es) played on 15 November 2026. Source: Erste Liga
Legend: Blue = home team win; Yellow = draw; Red = away team win.

=== Group 3 ===
Pos	Team	Pld	W	D	L	GF	GA	GD	Pts	Qualification
1	St. Gallen U-21	14	10	1	3	28	21	+7	31	Advance to the promotion play-offs
2	Taverne	14	9	3	2	35	16	+19	30	Advance to the promotion play-offs
3	Baden	14	7	3	4	33	21	+12	24	Possible promotion play-offs
4	Kosova	14	6	6	2	25	17	+8	24	
5	Tuggen	14	7	3	4	28	21	+7	24	
6	Collina d'Oro	14	7	3	4	16	14	+2	24	
7	Thalwil	14	5	4	5	21	23	−2	19	
8	Freienbach	14	5	4	5	19	21	−2	19	
9	Wettswil-Bonstetten	14	5	3	6	21	20	+1	18	
10	Dietikon	13	4	3	6	19	22	−3	15	
11	Eschen/Mauren	13	4	3	6	23	26	−3	15	
12	Gossau	14	4	2	8	17	29	−12	14	
13	Mendrisio	14	2	7	5	17	19	−2	13	
14	Winterthur U-21	14	4	1	9	16	30	−14	13	
15	Widnau	14	3	3	8	16	29	−13	12	Relegated to the 2027–28 2. Liga Interregional
16	Locarno	14	2	5	7	13	18	−5	11	Relegated to the 2027–28 2. Liga Interregional

Updated to match(es) played on 15 November 2026. Source: Erste Liga

==== Results ====
Home \ Away	SGM	TUG	TAV	THA	BAD	KOS	COL	DIE	GOS	ESM	LOC	FRE	WET	WIM	MEN	WID
St. Gallen U-21	—		2–2		0–3	5–1	2–0					1–0	1–2			
Tuggen	1–2	—	4–2		2–1	0–0	3–3	3–1				1–2				3–0
Taverne			—	2–0				3–2	5–0	1–2			3–1	4–1	2–1	5–0
Thalwil	5–1	2–1		—		2–4	2–1		2–1		2–2	3–0				0–4
Baden			2–3	3–1	—			2–1		3–1			3–1	2–1	1–1	6–0
Kosova			1–1		2–2	—		1–0		5–0			2–1	2–1	0–0	
Collina d'Oro			0–2			1–1	—	2–0		1–0			1–0	1–0	1–1	
Dietikon				1–1				—	2–1		2–2		1–0	2–2	2–0	2–1
Gossau	1–2	1–4			3–2	0–3	0–1		—		1–0	0–0				4–1
Eschen/Mauren	2–3	4–0		0–0					1–2	—				4–0	4–3	
Locarno	2–3	1–2	0–0		3–1	1–0	0–2				—	0–1				0–0
Freienbach					2–2	3–3	3–1	4–3		0–0		—	1–2			
Wettswil-Bonstetten				1–1					2–2	4–1	2–1		—	3–0	1–1	
Winterthur U-21	1–2	1–3		2–0							2–1	3–2		—	2–1	
Mendrisio	1–3	1–1							4–1		0–0	2–0			—	
Widnau	0–1						0–1			4–4		0–1	2–1	3–0	1–1	—

Updated to match(es) played on 15 November 2026. Source: Erste Liga
Legend: Blue = home team win; Yellow = draw; Red = away team win.
