= A.D. Marco 09 =

Portuguese football club

AD Marco 09
- Full name: Associação Desportiva de Marco de Canaveses 09
- Founded: 2009
- Ground: Estádio Municipal do Marco de Canaveses, Marco de Canaveses
- Capacity: 6,000
- Chairman: Eduardo Godinho Felipe
- Head Coach: Milton Mendes
- League: Liga 3
- 2024-25: 2nd of 14 (Group B); 3rd of 4 (Promotion Group) (Promoted via Boavista F.C.
- Website: admarco09.pt
| Home colours | Away colours |

A.D. Marco 09 is a Portuguese football club based in Marco de Canaveses, a municipality on Porto district. Founded in 2009, it is the successor of the now-extinct F.C. Marco. The club holds home matches at the Estádio Municipal do Marco de Canaveses, with a capacity for more than 6,000 spectators.

== History ==
After severe financial problems, F.C. Marco was prevented from competing in senior football competitions in 2007, with its last season being the 2006/07. It was only at the end of the 2007/08 season that it definitively ceased its activities. In 2009, A.D. Marco 09 was founded, respecting the original colors and emblem.

It made its debut in the 2009/10 season in the 2nd Division of the A.F. Porto. The team was promoted in its first year and spent the next three seasons in the second tier of district football before ending senior football in 2014.

It was a brief pause during the 2014/15 season, before resuming the senior team in 2015/16, again in the 2nd District Division. Since then, the rise has been rapid, culminating in 2023 with the historic promotion to the national divisions (to the Campeonato de Portugal). Since then, the team has been competing in the fourth tier of Portuguese football.

In 2024, the club's members approved the return of the name and emblem of F.C. Marco, refounding the old club. The board intends to make the change official starting from the 2025/26 season.

== Recent seasons ==
| Season | Level | Division | Section | Place | Movements |
|---|---|---|---|---|---|
| 2018–19 | Tier 5 | A.F. Porto Divisão de Honra | Champion mini-league | 3rd | Promoted |
| 2019–20 | Tier 4 | A.F. Porto Pró-Nacional | Série 2 | 5th | |
| 2020–21 | Tier 4 | A.F. Porto Pró-Nacional | Final phase, Série 7 | Winner | |
| 2021–22 | Tier 5 (Note: The club moved to the fifth tier due to the reorganization of the national championships but remained in the top district division.) | A.F. Porto Pró-Nacional | Relegation/Série 4 | 2nd | |
| 2022–23 | Tier 5 | A.F. Porto Pró-Nacional | Championship | Champion | Promoted |
| 2023–24 | Tier 4 | Campeonato de Portugal | Série B | 4th | |
| 2024–25 | Tier 4 | Campeonato de Portugal | Série B | 2nd | Promoted |
| 2025-26 | Tier 3 | Liga 3 | Group A | | |

== Current squad ==
As of 20 September 2026

Note: Flags indicate national team as defined under FIFA eligibility rules; some limited exceptions apply. Players may hold more than one non-FIFA nationality.

| No. | Pos. | Nation | Player |
|---|---|---|---|
| 2 | DF | BRA | Victor Thiago |
| 4 | DF | BRA | Chicão |
| 5 | MF | BRA | Maycon |
| 6 | MF | POR | Fábio Pacheco |
| 7 | FW | BRA | Gustavo Lobo (on loan from Leixões) |
| 8 | FW | POR | Erivaldo |
| 9 | FW | CPV | Ká Semedo |
| 10 | FW | COL | Luis Garro |
| 14 | FW | BRA | Pepê |
| 17 | MF | POR | Zé Gata |
| 18 | MF | POR | Francisco Fernandes |
| 19 | FW | POR | Pedro Ribeiro |
| 20 | MF | CIV | Ben Traoré |
| 21 | DF | POR | Pedrosa |

| No. | Pos. | Nation | Player |
|---|---|---|---|
| 23 | MF | POR | João Guilherme |
| 26 | GK | POR | Zé Couto |
| 28 | FW | POR | Fábio Sambú |
| 29 | MF | BRA | Lucas Henrique |
| 32 | DF | POR | Rodrigo Rêgo |
| 35 | MF | POR | João Pedro |
| 36 | FW | BRA | Dudu |
| 64 | GK | POR | Tiago Martins |
| 67 | FW | GBS | Bruma |
| 70 | MF | POR | Tomé Teixeira |
| 77 | DF | JAM | Ronaldo Barrett |
| 82 | DF | COL | Jhonnys Guerrero |
| 96 | GK | POR | Rúben Rendeiro |
| — | FW | BRA | Thalles |
