= Juan Mosquera (footballer, born 1996) =

Colombian footballer (born 1996)

Personal information
- Full name: Juan Alberto Mosquera Álvarez
- Date of birth: 10 February 1996 (age 30)
- Place of birth: Turbo, Colombia
- Height: 1.76 m (5 ft 9 in)
- Position: Midfielder

Youth career
- Envigado

Senior career*
Years	Team	Apps	(Gls)
2015–2019	Envigado	76	(2)
2020–2021	Marítimo B	6	(0)
2021	Bucaramanga	13	(0)

International career
2013	Colombia U17	2	(0)
2014	Colombia U21	3	(0)
- * Club domestic league appearances and goals as of 00:26, 3 January 2022 (UTC)

Juan Alberto Mosquera Álvarez (born 10 February 1996) is a Colombian professional footballer who plays as a midfielder.

== Career ==
Juan Mosquera was born in Turbo, Colombia. On 21 January 2020, he signed with Portuguese club Marítimo.
