= 2017–18 Primeira Liga =

84th season of top-tier Portuguese football

Primeira Liga
- Season: 2017–18
- Dates: 6 August 2017 – 13 May 2018
- Champions: Porto; 28th title
- Relegated: Paços de Ferreira; Estoril
- Champions League: Porto; Benfica
- Europa League: Sporting CP; Braga; Rio Ave
- Matches: 306
- Goals: 826 (2.7 per match)
- Top goalscorer: Jonas (34 goals)
- Biggest home win: Braga 6–0 Estoril (1 October 2017)
- Biggest away win: Estoril 0–6 Braga (3 March 2018)
- Highest scoring: Porto 5–2 Portimonense (22 September 2017); Belenenses 3–4 Sporting CP (15 April 2018)
- Longest winning run: 9 matches Benfica
- Longest unbeaten run: 23 matches Porto
- Longest winless run: 11 matches Estoril
- Longest losing run: 8 matches Estoril
- Highest attendance: 63,526; Benfica 0–1 Porto (15 April 2018)
- Lowest attendance: 942; Estoril 0–0 Portimonense (4 December 2017)
- Total attendance: 3,655,213
- Average attendance: 11,945

The 2017–18 Primeira Liga (also known as Liga NOS for sponsorship reasons) was the 84th season of the Primeira Liga, the top professional league for Portuguese association football clubs. Benfica were the defending champions for a fourth consecutive time, but they did not retain the title. Porto became the new champions with two matches to spare, clinching their 28th league title. This was their first trophy in four years.

Since Portugal dropped from fifth to seventh place in the UEFA association coefficient rankings at the end of 2016–17 season, only the two best-ranked teams could qualify for the UEFA Champions League (the champions entered directly into the group stage, and the runners-up entered the third qualifying round). The third and fourth-placed teams qualified respectively to the UEFA Europa League third and second qualifying rounds.

== Teams ==
Eighteen teams competed in the league – the top sixteen teams from the 2016–17 season, as well as two teams promoted from the LigaPro.

Portimonense became the first club to be promoted on 23 April 2017 and will play in Primeira Liga for the first time since the 2010–11 season. On 21 May 2017, after a 2–1 win in Azores against Santa Clara, they were crowned champions. The other team promoted were runners-up Desportivo das Aves, following a 2–2 draw against União da Madeira on 30 April 2017. This will mark the return of the Vila das Aves' team to the top flight after a 10-season absence.

The two promoted clubs replaced Nacional and Arouca. Nacional confirmed their relegation on 5 May 2017, 15 years after their promotion, when Moreirense, who were also struggling to escape relegation, beat Braga. On the last matchday, Arouca's 4–2 defeat against Estoril sealed their relegation, four seasons after having been promoted for the first time to Primeira Liga.

=== Stadia and locations ===
Location of teams in 2017–18 Primeira Liga (Mainland)
Location of teams in 2017–18 Primeira Liga (Madeira)

Team	Location	Stadium	Capacity	2016–17 finish
Belenenses	Lisbon	Estádio do Restelo	15,016	14th
Benfica	Lisbon	Estádio da Luz	64,642	1st
Boavista	Porto	Estádio do Bessa	27,363	9th
Braga	Braga	Estádio Municipal de Braga	30,287	5th
Chaves	Chaves	Estádio Municipal Eng. Manuel Branco Teixeira	8,870	11th
Desportivo das Aves	Aves	Estádio do CD Aves	6,230	2nd (LP)
Estoril	Estoril	Estádio António Coimbra da Mota	7,891	10th
Feirense	Santa Maria da Feira	Estádio Marcolino de Castro	5,450	8th
Marítimo	Funchal	Estádio do Marítimo	10,566	6th
Moreirense	Moreira de Cónegos	Parque de Jogos Comendador Joaquim de Almeida Freitas	6,152	15th
Paços de Ferreira	Paços de Ferreira	Estádio Capital do Móvel	9,078	13th
Porto	Porto	Estádio do Dragão	50,034	2nd
Portimonense	Portimão	Estádio Municipal de Portimão	4,931	1st (LP)
Rio Ave	Vila do Conde	Estádio dos Arcos	8,957	7th
Sporting CP	Lisbon	Estádio José Alvalade	50,049	3rd
Tondela	Tondela	Estádio João Cardoso	5,000	16th
Vitória de Guimarães	Guimarães	Estádio D. Afonso Henriques	30,007	4th
Vitória de Setúbal	Setúbal	Estádio do Bonfim	14,274	12th

=== Personnel and sponsors ===
Team	Manager	Captain	Kit Manufacturer	Sponsors
Belenenses	(Portugal) Silas	(Portugal) Gonçalo Silva	Lacatoni	Kia Motors
Benfica	(Portugal) Rui Vitória	(Brazil) Luisão	Adidas	Emirates
Boavista	(Portugal) Jorge Simão	(Senegal) Idris	BLK	Mestre da Cor
Braga	(Portugal) Abel Ferreira	(Montenegro) Nikola Vukčević	Lacatoni	Visit Braga
Chaves	(Portugal) Luís Castro	(Portugal) Nuno André Coelho	Lacatoni	Museu do Pão
Desportivo das Aves	(Portugal) José Mota	(Portugal) Nélson Lenho	Macron	MEO
Estoril	(Portugal) Ivo Vieira	(Portugal) Diogo Amado	Nike	EuroBic
Feirense	(Portugal) Nuno Manta	(Portugal) Cris	Legea	Castro Electrónica
Marítimo	(Portugal) Daniel Ramos	(Portugal) Edgar Costa	Nike	Santander Totta
Moreirense	(Portugal) Petit	(Portugal) André Micael	CDT	—
Paços de Ferreira	(Portugal) João Henriques	(Cape Verde) Ricardo	Lacatoni	Aldro
Portimonense	(Portugal) Vítor Oliveira	(Portugal) Ricardo Pessoa	Mizuno	McDonald's Portimão
Porto	(Portugal) Sérgio Conceição	(Spain) Iván Marcano	New Balance	MEO
Rio Ave	(Portugal) Miguel Cardoso	(Portugal) Tarantini	Adidas	MEO
Sporting CP	(Portugal) Jorge Jesus	(Portugal) William Carvalho	Macron	NOS
Tondela	(Portugal) Pepa	(Portugal) Ricardo Costa	CDT	Laboratórios BASI
Vitória de Guimarães	(Portugal) José Peseiro	(Portugal) Josué Sá	Macron	—
Vitória de Setúbal	(Portugal) José Couceiro	(Portugal) Vasco Fernandes	Hummel	Kia Motors

=== Managerial changes ===
Team	Outgoing manager	Manner of departure	Date of vacancy	Position in table	Incoming manager	Date of appointment
Porto	(Portugal) Nuno Espírito Santo	Resigned	22 May 2017	Pre-season	(Portugal) Sérgio Conceição	8 June 2017
Desportivo das Aves	(Portugal) José Mota	Resigned	23 May 2017	Pre-season	(Portugal) Ricardo Soares	27 May 2017
Rio Ave	(Portugal) Luís Castro	Mutual consent	24 May 2017	Pre-season	(Portugal) Miguel Cardoso	12 June 2017
Moreirense	(Portugal) Petit	Mutual consent	26 May 2017	Pre-season	(Portugal) Manuel Machado	27 May 2017
Chaves	(Portugal) Ricardo Soares	Resigned	27 May 2017	Pre-season	(Portugal) Luís Castro	1 June 2017
Boavista	(Portugal) Miguel Leal	Resigned	13 September 2017	16th	(Portugal) Jorge Simão	14 September 2017
Desportivo das Aves	(Portugal) Ricardo Soares	Sacked	2 October 2017	16th	(Angola) Lito Vidigal	2 October 2017
Estoril	(Portugal) Pedro Emanuel	Mutual consent	21 October 2017	18th	(Portugal) Filipe Pedro	21 October 2017
Paços de Ferreira	(Portugal) Vasco Seabra	Mutual consent	23 October 2017	13th	(Portugal) Petit	23 October 2017
Moreirense	(Portugal) Manuel Machado	Sacked	29 October 2017	17th	(Portugal) Sérgio Vieira	31 October 2017
Estoril	(Portugal) Filipe Pedro	End of caretaker role	13 November 2017	18th	(Portugal) Ivo Vieira	13 November 2017
Paços de Ferreira	(Portugal) Petit	Mutual consent	8 January 2018	14th	(Portugal) João Henriques	12 January 2018
Belenenses	(Portugal) Domingos Paciência	Mutual consent	15 January 2018	11th	(Portugal) Silas	15 January 2018
Moreirense	(Portugal) Sérgio Vieira	Mutual consent	13 February 2018	17th	(Portugal) Petit	14 February 2018
Vitória de Guimarães	(Portugal) Pedro Martins	Sacked	18 February 2018	9th	(Portugal) José Peseiro	28 February 2018

== Season summary ==
=== League table ===
Pos	Team	Pld	W	D	L	GF	GA	GD	Pts	Qualification or relegation
1	Porto (C)	34	28	4	2	82	18	+64	88	Qualification for the Champions League group stage
2	Benfica	34	25	6	3	80	22	+58	81	Qualification for the Champions League third qualifying round
3	Sporting CP	34	24	6	4	63	24	+39	78	Qualification for the Europa League group stage (Note: Desportivo das Aves qualified for the Europa league group stage by winning the 2017–18 Taça de Portugal. However, since they failed to obtain a license for European competitions, the spot awarded to the cup winners (Europa League group stage) was passed to the third-placed team, the spot awarded to the third-placed team (Europa League third qualifying round) was passed to the fourth-placed team, and the spot awarded to the fourth-placed team was passed to the fifth-placed team (Europa league second qualifying round).)
4	Braga	34	24	3	7	74	29	+45	75	Qualification for the Europa League third qualifying round
5	Rio Ave	34	15	6	13	40	42	−2	51	Qualification for the Europa League second qualifying round
6	Chaves	34	13	8	13	47	55	−8	47 (Note: Chaves finished ahead of Marítimo on head-to-head points: Chaves 4–1 Marítimo, Marítimo 1–2 Chaves.)	
7	Marítimo	34	13	8	13	36	49	−13	47	
8	Boavista	34	13	6	15	35	44	−9	45	
9	Vitória de Guimarães	34	13	4	17	45	56	−11	43	
10	Portimonense	34	10	8	16	52	60	−8	38 (Note: Portimonense finished ahead of Tondela on head-to-head points: Portimonense 2–0 Tondela, Tondela 2–2 Portimonense.)	
11	Tondela	34	10	8	16	41	50	−9	38	
12	Belenenses (D, R)	34	9	10	15	33	46	−13	37	Transferred with B-SAD after the season (Note: Belenenses SAD split with B-SAD after the season, meaning they had to restart from the lowest league in Portugal.)
13	Desportivo das Aves	34	9	7	18	36	51	−15	34	
14	Vitória de Setúbal	34	7	11	16	39	62	−23	32 (Note: Vitória de Setúbal finished ahead of Moreirense on head-to-head away goals scored: Vitória de Setúbal 1–1 Moreirense, Moreirense 2–2 Vitória de Setúbal.)	
15	Moreirense	34	8	8	18	29	50	−21	32	
16	Feirense	34	9	4	21	32	48	−16	31	
17	Paços de Ferreira (R)	34	7	9	18	33	59	−26	30 (Note: Paços de Ferreira finished ahead of Estoril on head-to-head points: Paços de Ferreira 1–0 Estoril, Estoril 1–1 Paços de Ferreira.)	Relegation to LigaPro
18	Estoril (R)	34	8	6	20	29	61	−32	30	Relegation to LigaPro

Source: Liga Portugal
Rules for classification: 1) Points; 2) Head-to-head points; 3) Head-to-head goal difference; 4) Head-to-head away goals scored; 5) Goal difference; 6) Matches won; 7) Goals scored; 8) Play-off. (Note: only criteria 1, 5, 6 and 7 are applied to establish the classification during the competition.)
(C) Champions; (D) Disqualified; (R) Relegated

=== Positions by round ===
Team ╲ Round	1	2	3	4	5	6	7	8	9	10	11	12	13	14	15	16	17	18	19	20	21	22	23	24	25	26	27	28	29	30	31	32	33	34
Porto	1	1	2	2	1	1	1	1	1	1	1	1	1	1	1	1	1	1	1	1	1	1	1	1	1	1	1	2	2	1	1	1	1	1
Benfica	2	2	1	3	3	4	3	3	3	3	3	3	3	3	3	3	3	3	3	3	2	2	2	2	2	2	2	1	1	2	2	2	2	2
Sporting CP	3	3	2	1	2	2	2	2	2	2	2	2	2	2	2	2	2	2	2	2	3	3	3	3	3	3	3	3	3	3	3	3	3	3
Braga	16	8	5	7	9	6	5	5	4	4	4	4	4	4	4	4	4	4	4	4	4	4	4	4	4	4	4	4	4	4	4	4	4	4
Rio Ave	6	4	4	4	5	5	6	6	6	7	6	6	6	6	6	5	5	5	5	5	5	5	5	5	5	5	5	5	5	5	5	5	5	5
Chaves	12	17	14	17	18	17	11	11	15	15	14	11	11	8	9	8	7	7	7	8	6	7	6	6	6	7	8	8	8	8	7	7	6	6
Marítimo	6	6	6	5	4	3	4	4	5	5	5	5	5	5	5	6	6	6	6	6	8	9	8	8	8	8	6	6	6	6	6	6	7	7
Boavista	13	17	18	13	16	12	12	8	7	9	9	8	8	9	8	9	9	8	9	7	9	6	7	7	7	6	7	7	7	7	8	8	9	8
Vitória de Guimarães	4	10	11	11	7	9	8	9	10	8	8	7	7	7	7	7	8	9	8	9	7	8	9	9	9	10	9	10	9	9	9	9	8	9
Portimonense	5	5	9	14	17	13	14	14	14	11	11	10	9	11	11	12	12	12	13	11	10	11	10	10	12	9	10	9	10	10	10	11	12	10
Tondela	8	14	14	9	11	15	17	15	12	14	10	12	13	12	12	10	10	10	10	10	11	10	11	12	10	11	11	12	12	12	11	10	10	11
Belenenses	14	6	10	10	14	8	7	7	8	6	7	9	10	10	10	11	11	11	12	12	12	13	12	11	11	12	12	11	11	11	12	12	11	12
Desportivo das Aves	17	16	17	18	13	18	18	16	16	16	16	15	12	13	14	15	14	16	16	18	18	15	13	13	13	13	13	15	16	15	16	14	13	13
Vitória de Setúbal	8	14	12	12	8	10	10	13	11	13	15	16	16	16	18	18	17	17	17	16	16	18	14	15	14	15	16	13	14	13	14	16	17	14
Moreirense	8	11	13	16	12	16	16	17	17	17	17	17	17	17	16	14	15	14	15	15	15	17	18	18	15	17	14	16	13	14	13	13	14	15
Feirense	8	11	8	6	6	7	9	12	9	12	13	14	15	15	13	13	13	13	11	14	14	16	17	17	15	16	17	17	17	18	17	15	15	16
Paços de Ferreira	14	13	14	15	15	11	13	10	13	10	12	13	14	14	15	16	16	15	14	13	13	12	15	14	17	14	15	14	15	16	15	17	16	17
Estoril	18	8	7	8	10	14	15	18	18	18	18	18	18	18	17	17	18	18	18	17	17	14	16	16	18	18	18	18	18	17	18	18	18	18

Leader
Relegation to 2018–19 LigaPro

Source: Liga Portugal

=== Results ===
Home \ Away	BEL	BEN	BOA	BRA	CHA	DAV	EST	FEI	MAR	MOR	PAÇ	PRT	POR	RAV	SCP	TON	VGU	VSE
Belenenses	—	1–1	1–1	0–1	0–1	2–5	2–1	1–0	1–0	3–0	1–1	3–2	2–0	1–2	3–4	0–0	1–0	1–1
Benfica	5–0	—	4–0	3–1	3–0	2–0	3–1	1–0	5–0	1–0	2–0	2–1	0–1	5–1	1–1	2–3	2–0	6–0
Boavista	1–0	2–1	—	1–3	3–3	1–0	1–0	1–0	2–1	1–0	1–0	2–0	0–3	1–2	1–3	1–1	1–0	4–0
Braga	4–0	1–3	1–1	—	1–0	2–0	6–0	3–1	2–0	3–0	3–0	2–1	0–1	2–1	1–0	1–0	2–1	3–1
Chaves	1–1	0–1	0–0	1–4	—	1–1	2–0	0–2	4–1	3–0	4–2	2–1	0–4	1–1	1–2	1–1	4–3	2–2
Desportivo das Aves	2–1	1–3	3–0	0–2	2–3	—	1–0	1–0	0–0	1–2	0–2	3–0	1–1	0–0	0–2	0–1	1–3	1–4
Estoril	0–2	1–2	0–3	0–6	0–2	3–2	—	0–2	1–1	0–2	1–1	0–0	1–3	0–2	2–0	3–0	3–0	2–1
Feirense	1–4	0–2	3–0	2–2	1–2	0–1	0–0	—	0–1	1–0	2–1	1–3	1–2	1–0	2–3	1–1	2–1	1–0
Marítimo	0–0	1–1	1–0	1–0	1–2	2–1	0–0	4–1	—	1–1	1–0	0–3	0–1	1–0	2–1	2–0	3–2	4–2
Moreirense	2–1	0–2	1–0	0–1	0–1	0–3	1–2	0–0	1–1	—	2–0	1–1	0–0	2–1	1–1	0–3	2–1	2–2
Paços de Ferreira	1–1	1–3	1–2	1–5	2–0	2–2	1–0	2–1	0–0	3–2	—	1–1	1–0	0–0	1–2	0–2	0–0	1–0
Portimonense	0–0	1–3	2–1	1–2	0–1	2–2	0–1	2–1	1–2	4–3	3–1	—	1–5	4–1	1–2	2–0	2–1	5–2
Porto	2–0	0–0	2–0	3–1	3–0	2–0	4–0	2–1	3–1	3–0	6–1	5–2	—	5–0	2–1	1–0	4–2	5–1
Rio Ave	1–0	1–1	2–0	1–0	2–1	0–0	2–0	2–1	3–0	2–1	4–2	2–0	1–2	—	0–1	1–1	0–1	2–1
Sporting CP	1–0	0–0	1–0	2–2	5–1	3–0	2–1	2–0	5–0	1–0	2–0	2–0	0–0	2–0	—	2–0	1–0	1–0
Tondela	2–0	1–5	3–2	1–2	2–0	3–0	2–3	3–1	1–2	1–2	2–2	2–2	0–1	1–3	1–2	—	1–4	1–1
Vitória de Guimarães	0–0	1–3	1–0	0–5	3–2	2–1	3–1	1–0	2–1	1–0	3–2	3–3	0–1	3–0	0–5	0–1	—	1–1
Vitória de Setúbal	3–0	1–2	1–1	2–0	1–1	0–1	2–2	0–2	3–1	1–1	1–0	1–1	0–5	1–0	1–1	1–0	1–2	—

Updated to match(es) played on 13 May 2018. Source: Liga Portugal
Legend: Blue = home team win; Yellow = draw; Red = away team win.
For upcoming matches, an "a" indicates there is an article about the rivalry between the two participants.

== Statistics ==
=== Top goalscorers ===
Rank	Player	Club	Goals
1	(Brazil) Jonas	Benfica	34
2	(Netherlands) Bas Dost	Sporting CP	27
3	(Mali) Moussa Marega	Porto	22
4	(Cameroon) Vincent Aboubakar	Porto	15
4	(Brazil) Fabrício	Portimonense	15
4	(Brazil) Raphinha	Vitória de Guimarães	15
7	(Portugal) Paulinho	Braga	13
8	(Portugal) Ricardo Horta	Braga	11
8	(Peru) Paolo Hurtado	Vitória de Guimarães	11
8	(Brazil) William	Chaves	11
8	(Portugal) Bruno Fernandes	Sporting CP	11

==== Hat-tricks ====
Player	For	Against	Result	Date
(Brazil) Jonas	Benfica	Belenenses	5–0	19 August 2017
(Cameroon) Vincent Aboubakar	Porto	Moreirense	3–0	20 August 2017
(Netherlands) Bas Dost	Sporting CP	Chaves	5–1	22 October 2017
(Cameroon) Vincent Aboubakar	Porto	Vitória de Setúbal	5–0	10 December 2017
(Netherlands) Bas Dost	Sporting CP	Marítimo	5–0	7 January 2018
(Netherlands) Bas Dost	Sporting CP	Desportivo das Aves	3–0	14 January 2018
(Brazil) Fabrício	Portimonense	Rio Ave	4–1	29 January 2018
(Brazil) Jonas	Benfica	Marítimo	5–0	3 March 2018
(Portugal) Edinho^{4}	Vitória de Setúbal	Desportivo das Aves	4–1	29 March 2018
(Portugal) Jorge Pires	Portimonense	Moreirense	4–3	31 March 2018

Note

^{4} Player scored 4 goals

=== Top assists ===
As of 14 May 2018

Rank	Player	Club	Assists
1	(Brazil) Alex Telles	Porto	13
2	(Portugal) Ricardo Esgaio	Braga	10
2	(Japan) Shoya Nakajima	Portimonense	10
4	(Brazil) Jefferson	Braga	9
5	(Algeria) Yacine Brahimi	Porto	8
5	(Argentina) Franco Cervi	Benfica	8
5	(Portugal) Bruno Fernandes	Sporting CP	8
5	(Portugal) Ricardo Horta	Braga	8
5	(Portugal) Gelson Martins	Sporting CP	8
5	(Portugal) António Xavier	Paços de Ferreira	8

=== Clean sheets ===
Rank	Player	Club	Clean sheets
1	(Portugal) Rui Patrício	Sporting CP	17
2	(Brazil) Matheus	Braga	14
3	(Portugal) Bruno Varela	Benfica	13
4	(Spain) Iker Casillas	Porto	12
5	(Brazil) Vagner	Boavista	11
6	(Brazil) Charles	Marítimo	10
7	(Brazil) Cássio	Rio Ave	9
7	(Brazil) Caio Secco	Feirense	9
9	(Portugal) Cláudio Ramos	Tondela	8
10	(Portugal) José Sá	Porto	7
10	(Brazil) Adriano Facchini	Feirense	7

=== Scoring ===
- First goal of the season:
  - (Portugal) Gelson Martins, for Sporting CP vs Desportivo das Aves (6 August 2017)
- Latest goal of the season:
  - (Armenia) Gevorg Ghazaryan, for Marítimo vs Sporting CP (13 May 2018)
- Biggest home win:
  - Braga 6–0 Estoril (1 October 2017)
- Biggest away win:
  - Estoril 0–6 Braga (3 March 2018)
- Highest scoring match: 7 goals
  - Porto 5–2 Portimonense (22 September 2017)
  - Porto 6–1 Paços de Ferreira (21 October 2017)
  - Portimonense 5–2 Vitória de Setúbal (30 October 2017)
- Biggest winning margin: 6 goals
  - Braga 6–0 Estoril (1 October 2017)
- Most goals scored in a match by a team: 6 goals
  - Braga 6–0 Estoril (1 October 2017)
  - Porto 6–1 Paços de Ferreira (21 October 2017)

=== Match streaks ===
- Longest winning run: 9 matches
  - Benfica, from matchday 21 (3 February 2018) to matchday 29 (7 April 2017)
- Longest unbeaten run: 25 matches
  - Porto, from matchday 1 (6 August 2017) to matchday 25 (2 March 2018)
- Longest winless run: 11 matches
  - Estoril, from matchday 4 (27 August 2017) to matchday 14 (9 December 2017)
- Longest losing run: 8 matches
  - Estoril, from matchday 4 (27 August 2017) to matchday 11 (4 November 2017)
- Most consecutive draws: 5 matches
  - Vitória de Setúbal, from matchday 16 (4 January 2018) to matchday 20 (31 January 2018)

=== Discipline ===
==== Club ====
- Most yellow cards: 104
  - Feirense
- Most red cards: 8
  - Paços de Ferreira

==== Player ====
- Most yellow cards: 14
  - (Cape Verde) Babanco (Feirense)
- Most red cards: 3
  - (Brazil) Marcão (Rio Ave)
  - (Algeria) Hassan Yebda (Belenenses)

== Awards ==
=== Monthly awards ===
==== Liga Portugal ====
Month	Player of the Month		Goal of the Month			
Month	Name	Club	Name	Club	Against	Date
August	(Portugal) Bruno Fernandes	Sporting CP	(Portugal) Bruno Fernandes	Sporting CP	Vitória de Guimarães	19 August 2017
September	(Portugal) Bruno Fernandes	Sporting CP	(Portugal) Bruno Fernandes	Sporting CP	Tondela	16 September 2017
October/November	(Brazil) Jonas	Benfica	(Portugal) Rodrigo Pinho	Marítimo	Tondela	28 October 2017
December	(Brazil) Jonas	Benfica	(Brazil) Dráusio	Marítimo	Moreirense	2 December 2017
January	(Brazil) Jonas	Benfica	(Algeria) Yacine Brahimi	Porto	Vitória de Guimarães	7 January 2018
February	(Brazil) Jonas	Benfica	(Argentina) Franco Cervi	Benfica	Portimonense	10 February 2018
March	(Brazil) Jonas	Benfica	(Portugal) André Pereira	Vitória de Setúbal	Portimonense	6 March 2018
April	(Portugal) Bruno Fernandes	Sporting CP	(Mexico) Héctor Herrera	Porto	Benfica	15 April 2018

Month	Goalkeeper of the Month		Defender of the Month		Midfielder of the Month		Forward of the Month		Manager of the Month	
Month	Name	Club	Name	Club	Name	Club	Name	Club	Name	Club
August	(Spain) Iker Casillas	Porto	(Brazil) Alex Telles	Porto	(Portugal) Bruno Fernandes	Sporting CP	(Cameroon) Vincent Aboubakar	Porto	(Portugal) Miguel Cardoso	Rio Ave
September	(Brazil) Charles	Marítimo	(Brazil) Bebeto	Marítimo	(Portugal) Danilo Pereira	Porto	(Mali) Moussa Marega	Porto	(Portugal) Daniel Ramos	Marítimo
October/November	(Portugal) Rui Patrício	Sporting CP	(Uruguay) Sebastián Coates	Sporting CP	(Brazil) Dener	Portimonense	(Japan) Shoya Nakajima	Portimonense	(Portugal) Vítor Oliveira	Portimonense
December	(Portugal) José Sá	Porto	(France) Jérémy Mathieu	Sporting CP	(Portugal) Danilo Pereira	Porto	(Mali) Moussa Marega	Porto	(Portugal) Sérgio Conceição	Porto
January	(Portugal) Rui Patrício	Sporting CP	(Brazil) Alex Telles	Porto	(Brazil) Fabrício	Portimonense	(Brazil) Jonas	Benfica	(Portugal) Rui Vitória	Benfica
February	(Brazil) Matheus	Braga	(Brazil) Alex Telles	Porto	(Montenegro) Nikola Vukčević	Braga	(Brazil) Jonas	Benfica	(Portugal) Sérgio Conceição	Porto
March	(Portugal) Bruno Varela	Benfica	(Portugal) Rúben Dias	Benfica	(Portugal) André Horta	Braga	(Brazil) Jonas	Benfica	(Portugal) Abel Ferreira	Braga
April	(Spain) Iker Casillas	Porto	(Brazil) Alex Telles	Porto	(Mexico) Héctor Herrera	Porto	(Portugal) Miguel Cardoso	Tondela	(Portugal) Sérgio Conceição	Porto

==== SJPF Young Player of the Month ====
Month	Player	Club	Vote percentage
August	(Portugal) Bruno Fernandes	Sporting CP	22.51%
September	(Portugal) Bruno Fernandes	Sporting CP	18.78%
October/November	(Portugal) Bruno Fernandes	Sporting CP	14.94%
December	(Portugal) Bruno Varela	Benfica	14.00%
January	(Portugal) Gonçalo Paciência	Vitória de Setúbal	19.01%
February	(Portugal) Bruno Fernandes	Sporting CP	17.30%
March	(Portugal) André Pereira	Vitória de Setúbal	24.09%
April	(Portugal) Bruno Fernandes	Sporting CP	16.87%

==== SPJF Goal of the month ====
Month	Scorer	For	Against	Stadium	Date	Vote percentage
August	(Portugal) Bruno Fernandes	Sporting CP	Vitória de Guimarães	Estádio D. Afonso Henriques	19 August 2017	32.05%
September	(Portugal) André Sousa	Belenenses	Feirense	Estádio Marcolino de Castro	24 September 2017	41.67%
October	(Portugal) Rodrigo Pinho	Marítimo	Tondela	Estádio do Marítimo	28 October 2017	54.70%
November	(Japan) Shoya Nakajima	Portimonense	Tondela	Estádio Municipal de Portimão	25 November 2017	40.74%
December	(Brazil) Dráusio	Marítimo	Moreirense	Parque Joaquim de Almeida Freitas	2 December 2017	37.78%
January	(Brazil) Fabrício	Portimonense	Rio Ave	Estádio Municipal de Portimão	29 January 2018	33.33%
February	(Japan) Shoya Nakajima	Portimonense	Feirense	Estádio Marcolino de Castro	16 February 2018	47.06%
March	(Brazil) Nildo Petrolina	Desportivo das Aves	Portimonense	Estádio do CD Aves	5 March 2018	44.44%
April	(Mexico) Héctor Herrera	Porto	Benfica	Estádio da Luz	15 April 2018	37.04%
May	(Cape Verde) Kuca	Boavista	Belenenses	Estádio do Bessa	12 May 2018	44.44%

=== Annual awards ===
==== Liga Portugal ====
===== Player of the Season =====
The Player of the Season was awarded to (Portugal) Bruno Fernandes (Sporting CP).

===== Manager of the Season =====
The Manager of the Season was awarded to (Portugal) Sérgio Conceição (Porto).

===== Goal of the Season =====
The Goal of the Season was awarded to (Brazil) Rodrigo Pinho (Marítimo), against Tondela on 28 October 2017.

Team of the Season

=== Team of the Year ===
Team of the Year
Goalkeeper	(Portugal) Rui Patrício (Sporting CP)			
Defenders	(Brazil) Alex Telles (Porto)	(Brazil) Felipe (Porto)	(Uruguay) Sebastián Coates (Sporting CP)	(Portugal) Ricardo Pereira (Porto)
Midfielders	(Portugal) Bruno Fernandes (Sporting CP)		(Mexico) Héctor Herrera (Porto)	(Portugal) Pizzi (Benfica)
Attackers	(Brazil) Jonas (Benfica)		(Mali) Moussa Marega (Porto)	(Portugal) Gelson Martins (Sporting CP)

==== Young Player of the Season ====
The Young Player of the Year was awarded to (Portugal) Rúben Dias (Benfica).

==== Club Fair-Play Prize ====
The Club Fair-Play Prize was awarded to Chaves.

==== Player Fair-Play Prize ====
The Player Fair-Play Prize was awarded to (Spain) Casillas (Porto).

==== Goal of the season ====
The goal of the season was disputed by all the previous winners of the monthly polls.

Rank	Scorer	Vote percentage
1st	(Mexico) Héctor Herrera	43.70%
2nd	(Portugal) André Sousa	12.20%
3rd	(Portugal) Bruno Fernandes	10.23%

== Attendances ==
Pos	Team	Total	High	Low	Average	Change
1	Benfica	532,758	61,996	47,207	53,276	−4.8%
2	Sporting CP	479,468	47,017	42,285	43,588	+1.9%
3	Porto	454,950	49,809	32,711	41,359	+11.4%
4	Vitória de Guimarães	166,954	25,702	9,519	16,695	−11.0%
5	Braga	138,917	21,382	7,607	12,629	+9.9%
6	Marítimo	73,454	9,537	5,264	6,678	−14.6%
7	Boavista	64,259	14,676	3,695	6,426	+5.6%
8	Rio Ave	41,603	8,614	1,781	4,160	+5.2%
9	Feirense	39,006	5,449	2,518	3,546	+19.3%
10	Chaves	34,962	8,480	2,076	3,496	−3.5%
11	Desportivo das Aves	32,700	5,462	1,567	2,973	+157.8%^{1}
12	Vitória de Setúbal	29,350	7,540	1,052	2,668	−30.6%
13	Belenenses	27,421	9,268	1,223	2,742	−32.2%
14	Paços de Ferreira	27,155	5,534	1,237	2,716	−20.5%
15	Portimonense	25,056	2,970	2,088	2,506	+38.6%^{1}
16	Tondela	24,527	4,987	1,080	2,230	−3.4%^{2}
17	Moreirense	23,190	4,507	1,079	2,319	+5.5%
18	Estoril	18,435	6,258	942	1,844	−18.9%
	League total	2,234,165	61,996	942	11,821	−0.1%

Updated to games played on 7 February 2018
Source: Liga Portugal
Notes:
1: Played last season in LigaPro.
2: Tondela managed to get the highest season attendance of 4,987 spectators in two matches (against Porto and Benfica).
