= Jean Cléber =

Brazilian footballer

Personal information
- Full name: Jean Cléber Santos da Silva
- Date of birth: 29 April 1990 (age 36)
- Place of birth: São Paulo, Brazil
- Height: 1.80 m (5 ft 11 in)
- Position: Midfielder

Team information
- Current team: Avaí
- Number: 16

Senior career*
Years	Team	Apps	(Gls)
2011	Boa Esporte	25	(0)
2012	→ Nacional MG (loan)	8	(0)
2013	Linense	1	(0)
2013	Ipatinga	4	(0)
2014	América RN	34	(0)
2015	Ceará	6	(0)
2015	Botafogo PB	8	(1)
2016	CSA	21	(3)
2016–2021	Marítimo	90	(1)
2019–2020	→ CSA (loan)	36	(1)
2021–	Avaí	73	(1)
- * Club domestic league appearances and goals as of 19:06, 19 September 2023 (UTC)

Jean Cléber Santos da Silva (born 29 April 1990), commonly known as Jean Cléber, is a Brazilian professional footballer who plays as a midfielder for Avaí.
