= Charles Silva =

Brazilian footballer (born 1994)

Personal information
- Full name: Charles Marcelo da Silva
- Date of birth: 4 February 1994 (age 32)
- Place of birth: Belo Horizonte, Brazil
- Height: 1.85 m (6 ft 1 in)
- Position: Goalkeeper

Youth career
- 2009–2014: Cruzeiro
- 2014–2015: Vasco da Gama

Senior career*
| Years | Team | Apps | (Gls) |
| 2015–2016 | Vasco da Gama | 9 | (0) |
| 2016–2021 | Marítimo | 78 | (0) |
| 2021–2022 | Vizela | 5 | (0) |
| 2022–2023 | Olympiakos Nicosia | 5 | (0) |
| 2023–2026 | Vitória Guimarães | 27 | (0) |

International career^{‡}
| 2011 | Brazil U17 | 14 | (0) |
- * Club domestic league appearances and goals as of 31 August 2026 ‡ National team caps and goals as of 14:23, 15 September 2021 (UTC)

Charles Marcelo da Silva (born 4 February 1994), sometimes known simply as Charles, is a Brazilian footballer who plays as a goalkeeper.

== Club career ==
Born in Belo Horizonte, Minas Gerais, Charles Silva joined Cruzeiro's youth setup in 2009. On 22 January 2014 he moved to Vasco da Gama, being assigned to the youth team.

Charles Silva was promoted to the main squad in 2015, and made his Série A debut on 3 June, coming on as a first-half substitute for Julio dos Santos in a 0–3 home loss against Ponte Preta, after starter Jordi was sent off.

On 29 January 2016, Charles Silva signed a four-and-a-half-year-deal with Portuguese club Marítimo after leaving Vasco on a free transfer. He would make 93 appearances for Marítimo across six seasons, including four Europa League starts during the 2017–18 qualifying rounds.

On 1 July 2021, Marítimo would send Charles to another Portuguese club Vizela. He would start 14 times during the 2021–22 Primeira Liga season, also logging one Taça de Portugal start in the fourth round of the tournament in late November against Estrela da Amadora. Charles would lose his starting spot at Vizela in late December 2021, eventually dropping out of the squad in April 2022.

On 8 July 2022, Vizela allowed Charles to join Cypriot club Olympiakos Nicosia on a free transfer. On 27 August 2022, he would make his debut in a 1–2 loss to Anorthosis. He was subsequently dropped to the bench for their next two matches, most recently on 12 September against AEL Limassol.

On 27 June 2023, Portuguese club Vitória Guimarães announced the free signing of Charles on a two-year contract.

On 10 January 2026, Charles played in the Portuguese Taça da Liga final and secured the 2–1 win for The Conquistadores against their eternal rivals Braga by saving a last minute penalty from Zalazar, in which Vitória Guimarães ended their title drought after 13 years, whilst claiming the trophy for the first time as well.

On 1 September 2026, Charles left Vitória by mutual consent.

== Career statistics ==
As of match played 17 April 2024

Appearances and goals by club, season and competition
| Club | Season | League | | | State league | | National cup | | League cup | | Continental | | Other | | Total | |
| Club | Season | Division | Apps | Goals | Apps | Goals | Apps | Goals | Apps | Goals | Apps | Goals | Apps | Goals | Apps | Goals |
|---|---|---|---|---|---|---|---|---|---|---|---|---|---|---|---|---|
| Vasco da Gama | 2015 | Série A ye | 9 | 0 | 0 | 0 | 0 | 0 | — | | — | | — | | 9 | 0 |
| Marítimo | 2015–16 | Primeira Liga | 0 | 0 | — | | — | | 0 | 0 | — | | — | | 0 | 0 |
| Marítimo | 2016–17 | Primeira Liga | 18 | 0 | — | | 1 | 0 | 1 | 0 | — | | — | | 20 | 0 |
| Marítimo | 2017–18 | Primeira Liga | 27 | 0 | — | | 0 | 0 | 0 | 0 | 4 | 0 | — | | 33 | 0 |
| Marítimo | 2018–19 | Primeira Liga | 21 | 0 | — | | 2 | 0 | 2 | 0 | — | | — | | 25 | 0 |
| Marítimo | 2019–20 | Primeira Liga | 9 | 0 | — | | 0 | 0 | 4 | 0 | — | | — | | 13 | 0 |
| Marítimo | 2020–21 | Primeira Liga | 3 | 0 | — | | 1 | 0 | — | | — | | — | | 4 | 0 |
| Marítimo | Total | | 78 | 0 | — | | 4 | 0 | 7 | 0 | 4 | 0 | — | | 93 | 0 |
| Vizela | 2021–22 | Primeira Liga | 14 | 0 | — | | 1 | 0 | 0 | 0 | — | | — | | 15 | 0 |
| Olympiakos Nicosia | 2022–23 | Cypriot First Division | 5 | 0 | — | | 0 | 0 | — | | — | | — | | 5 | 0 |
| Vitória Guimarães | 2023–24 | Primeira Liga | 8 | 0 | — | | 5 | 0 | 0 | 0 | 0 | 0 | — | | 13 | 0 |
| Career total | | | 114 | 0 | 0 | 0 | 10 | 0 | 7 | 0 | 4 | 0 | 0 | 0 | 135 | 0 |

== Honours ==
Vasco

- Campeonato Carioca: 2015

Brazil

- South American U-17 Championship: 2011

Vitória SC

- Taça da Liga: 2025–26

Individual

- Primeira Liga Goalkeeper of the Month: March 2024
