= Rodrigo Rêgo (footballer, born 2002) =

Portuguese football player (born 2002)

Personal information
- Full name: Rodrigo Pedrosa Rêgo
- Date of birth: 26 March 2002 (age 24)
- Place of birth: Almada, Portugal
- Height: 1.83 m (6 ft 0 in)
- Position: Defender

Team information
- Current team: Marco 09
- Number: 32

Youth career
- 2011–2012: Almada
- 2012–2021: Sporting CP

Senior career*
Years	Team	Apps	(Gls)
2021–2022	Sporting CP	0	(0)
2021–2022	→ Varzim (loan)	19	(1)
2022–2024	FC Eindhoven	24	(0)
2024–2026	Varzim	38	(1)
2026–	Marco 09	3	(0)

International career
2017	Portugal U15	5	(0)
2018	Portugal U16	3	(0)
2018–2019	Portugal U17	12	(1)
2019	Portugal U18	9	(1)
2021	Portugal U20	3	(0)
- * Club domestic league appearances and goals as of 12 September 2026

Rodrigo Pedrosa Rêgo (born 26 March 2002) is a Portuguese professional footballer who plays as a defender for Liga 3 club Marco 09.

== Club career ==
Rêgo is a youth academy graduate of Sporting CP. On 31 August 2021, he joined Varzim on a season long loan deal. He made his professional debut for the club on 7 November 2021 in a 2–2 draw against Porto B. He scored his team's opening goal in 65th minute of the match and got sent off 15 minutes later.

On 11 July 2022, Rêgo signed a two-year contract with Dutch Eerste Divisie club Eindhoven.

== International career ==
Rêgo is a Portuguese youth international. He was part of squad which reached quarter-finals of 2019 UEFA European Under-17 Championship.

== Career statistics ==
=== Club ===
As of match played 7 November 2021

Appearances and goals by club, season and competition
Club	Season	League			Domestic Cup		League Cup		Continental		Total	
Club	Season	Division	Apps	Goals	Apps	Goals	Apps	Goals	Apps	Goals	Apps	Goals
Varzim (loan)	2021–22	Liga Portugal 2	1	1	0	0	0	0	—		1	1
Career total			1	1	0	0	0	0	0	0	1	1
