= Juan José Chaux Mosquera =

Colombian politician (1957–2021)

Ambassador of Colombia in the Dominican Republic
- In office May 13, 2008 – September 15, 2008
- President: Álvaro Uribe Vélez
- Succeeded by: Mario Montoya Uribe

Governor of Cauca
- In office March 3, 2004 – December 31, 2007

Senator of the Republic of Colombia Member of the Colombian House of Representatives
- In office July 20, 1998 – July 20, 2002

Personal details
- Born: 1957 Popayán, Cauca, Colombia
- Died: July 19, 2021 (aged 63–64) Cali, Valle del Cauca, Colombia
- Party: Colombian Liberal Party
- Education: Javeriana University
- Occupation: Lawyer, politician, diplomat

Juan José Chaux Mosquera (Popayán, September 6, 1957-Cali, July 19, 2021) was a Colombian lawyer, politician and diplomat, member of the Colombian Liberal Party. He was one of the most powerful men in Cauca, Colombia starting the 21st-century.

== Trayectory ==
Chaux Mosquera was born in 1957 in Popayán, department of Cauca. He is married to Mónica Donado and had two children, María Alejandra and Francisco.

Held several public positions, being Representative to the Chamber (1990–1991; 1991–1994; 1994–1998) and Senator (1998–2002) for Liberalism, governor of Cauca, councilor of Popayán and served as Colombia's ambassador to the Dominican Republic in the administration of Álvaro Uribe Vélez. Later was investigated for his alleged ties to paramilitaries.

The new ambassador, he advanced his law studies at the Javeriana University, was Governor of Cauca between 2004 and 2007, Senator of the Republic in the period 1998–2002, Representative to the Chamber between 1990 and 1998, and Councilor of the city of Popayan.

He also held the executive direction of the Corporation for the Reconstruction and Development of the Department of Cauca (CRC).

Chaux Mosquera was investigated for links to paramilitaries, specifically with the Calima Bloc. He faced a process in the Supreme Court of Justice for 'parapolitics', since he allegedly sought support from the armed groups.

The JEP court accepted the leader at the end of 2020, this being one of the first cases of parapolitics admitted in this jurisdiction. The ex-governor had promised to tell the truth in detail.

He suffered heart complications after being admitted to a clinic for surgery. With his death, several issues remain pending within the framework of his submission to the Special Jurisdiction for Peace, JEP.
