= Rodrigo Pinho =

Brazilian footballer (born 1991)

Personal information
- Full name: Rodrigo Cunha Pereira de Pinho
- Date of birth: 30 May 1991 (age 35)
- Place of birth: Henstedt-Ulzburg, Germany
- Height: 1.85 m (6 ft 1 in)
- Position: Forward

Team information
- Current team: AVS
- Number: 9

Youth career
- 2010–2011: Bangu

Senior career*
Years	Team	Apps	(Gls)
2011–2014	Bangu	10	(1)
2013	→ Cabofriense (loan)	15	(5)
2014	→ Madureira (loan)	13	(4)
2015	Madureira	15	(9)
2015–2017	Braga	13	(1)
2015–2017	Braga B	8	(5)
2016	→ Nacional (loan)	11	(1)
2017–2021	Marítimo	98	(26)
2021–2022	Benfica	5	(1)
2022	Benfica B	2	(3)
2023	Coritiba	22	(5)
2024–2026	Estrela da Amadora	70	(10)
2026–	AVS	4	(4)
- * Club domestic league appearances and goals as of 7 September 2026

Rodrigo Cunha Pereira de Pinho (born 30 May 1991) is a German-born Brazilian footballer who plays as a forward for Liga Portugal 2 club AVS.

== Club career ==
=== Early career ===
Born in Henstedt-Ulzburg, Germany while his father Nando was representing Hamburger SV, Pinho joined Bangu's youth setup in 2010, aged already 19. He made his debuts as a senior for the club in the following year's Copa Rio, but suffered a serious knee injury which took him out for six months.

==== Cabofriense (loan) ====
In 2013, he was loaned to Cabofriense until the end of the year, but was recalled in September.

=== Madureira ===
On 30 April 2014 Pinho was loaned to Madureira until December. In December, he opted not to renew his contract with Bangu, and signed permanently for Madura in the following month.

=== Braga ===
On 4 June 2015, after being the second top goalscorer of 2015 Campeonato Carioca, Pinho signed a four-year deal with Primeira Liga side S.C. Braga. He made his debut on the competition on 16 August, starting in a 2–1 home win against C.D. Nacional.

=== Marítimo ===
On 29 June 2017, Pinho signed a four-year contract with Marítimo.

=== Benfica ===
On 23 June 2021, Pinho joined Benfica on a five-year deal with the club. However, he was quickly ruled out for all the rest of the season after just 3 games (one goal), due to a ruptured cruciate ligament.

=== Coritiba ===
On 29 December 2022, Pinho moved from Benfica to Brazilian club Coritiba in a €2,5 million transfer. On 3 January 2024, his contract with Coritiba was terminated by mutual agreement.

=== Estrela da Amadora ===
On the same day he left Coritiba, Pinho returned to Portugal, signing a one-and-a-half-year contract with Primeira Liga side Estrela da Amadora.

== Career statistics ==
As of match played 25 July 2023

Appearances and goals by club, season and competition
Club	Season	League			State league		National cup		League cup		Continental		Other		Total	
Club	Season	Division	Apps	Goals	Apps	Goals	Apps	Goals	Apps	Goals	Apps	Goals	Apps	Goals	Apps	Goals
Bangu	2011	—			0	0	0	0	—		—		1 (Note: Appearance(s) in Copa Rio)	0	1	0
Bangu	2012	—			0	0	—		—		—		8	2	8	2
Bangu	2013	—			0	0	0	0	—		—		14	4	14	4
Bangu	2014	—			10 (Note: Appearances in Campeonato Carioca)	1	—		—		—		0	0	10	1
Bangu	Total				10	1	0	0	—		—		23	6	33	7
Cabofriense (loan)	2013	—			15 (Note: Appearances in Campeonato Carioca Série A2)	5	—		—		—		0	0	15	5
Madureira (loan)	2014	Série C	13	4	0	0	—		—		—		4	2	17	6
Madureira	2015	Série C	0	0	15	9	2	1	—		—		0	0	17	10
Madureira	Total		13	4	15	9	2	1	—		—		4	2	34	16
Braga	2015–16	Primeira Liga	3	0	—		0	0	0	0	0	0	—		3	0
Braga	2016–17	Primeira Liga	10	1	—		0	0	4	2	0	0	0	0	14	3
Braga	Total		13	1	—		0	0	4	2	0	0	0	0	17	3
Braga B	2015–16	LigaPro	1	0	—		—		—		—		—		1	0
Braga B	2016–17	LigaPro	7	5	—		—		—		—		—		7	5
Braga B	Total		8	5	—		—		—		—		—		8	5
Nacional (loan)	2015–16	Primeira Liga	11	1	—		0	0	1	0	—		—		12	1
Marítimo	2017–18	Primeira Liga	28	4	—		3	3	3	3	3 (Note: Appearances in UEFA Europa League)	1	—		37	11
Marítimo	2018–19	Primeira Liga	25	4	—		2	0	2	0	—		—		29	4
Marítimo	2019–20	Primeira Liga	27	9	—		1	0	3	0	—		—		31	9
Marítimo	2020–21	Primeira Liga	18	9	—		3	6	—		—		—		21	15
Marítimo	Total		98	26	—		9	9	8	3	3	1	—		118	39
Benfica	2021–22	Primeira Liga	3	1	—		0	0	0	0	0	0	—		3	1
Benfica	2022–23	Primeira Liga	2	0	—		1	0	2	0	2 (Note: Appearances in UEFA Champions League)	0	—		7	0
Benfica	Total		5	1	—		1	0	2	0	2	0	—		10	1
Benfica B	2022–23	Liga Portugal 2	2	3	—		—		—		—		—		2	3
Coritiba	2023	Série A	10	0	12 (Note: Appearances in Campeonato Paranaense)	5	4	0	—		—		—		26	5
Estrela da Amadora	2023–24	Primeira Liga	0	0	—		0	0	0	0	—		—		0	0
Career total			160	41	52	20	16	10	15	5	5	1	27	8	275	85

== Honors ==
Cabofriense

- Campeonato Carioca Série A2: 2013

Benfica

- Primeira Liga: 2022–23

Individual

- LPFP Primeira Liga Best Goal: 2017–18,
- Primeira Liga Forward of the Month: November 2020
