= Dráusio =

Brazilian footballer (born 1991)

Personal information
- Full name: Dráusio Luis Salla Gil
- Date of birth: 21 August 1991 (age 35)
- Place of birth: Campinas, Brazil
- Height: 1.88 m (6 ft 2 in)
- Position: Centre back

Youth career
- –2012: Bonsucesso

Senior career*
Years	Team	Apps	(Gls)
2012	Bonsucesso	0	(0)
2013	Paulista	0	(0)
2013–2015	Atlético Paranaense	18	(1)
2015–2016	Joinville	9	(0)
2016	Red Bull Brasil	0	(0)
2016–2017	Catania	33	(1)
2017–2018	Marítimo	12	(1)
- * Club domestic league appearances and goals as of 11 March 2018

Dráusio Luis Salla Gil (born 21 August 1991) is a Brazilian footballer who plays centre back.

== Football career ==
Throughout his career, Gil has proven his ability to use both feet equally well.

On the 2016–17 season, Draúsio play for Catania.

On 22 August 2017, Draúsio signed three years contract with Marítimo.
