= Bebeto (footballer, born 1990) =

Brazilian footballer

Personal information
- Full name: Roberto de Jesus Machado
- Date of birth: 1 January 1990 (age 36)
- Place of birth: Lagarto, Brazil
- Height: 1.74 m (5 ft 8 1/2 in)
- Position: Right-back

Team information
- Current team: Tondela
- Number: 2

Youth career
- 2008–2009: Cruzeiro
- 2009: → Bahia (loan)

Senior career*
Years	Team	Apps	(Gls)
2009–2011	Bahia	9	(0)
2011	→ Bahia de Feira (loan)		
2012	Paulista		
2013	Rio Verde		
2014–2015	Caxias	27	(0)
2016–2017	São Bento	23	(0)
2017–2020	Marítimo	69	(2)
2020–	Tondela	165	(6)
- * Club domestic league appearances and goals as of 18 May 2026

Roberto de Jesus Machado (born 1 January 1990), known as Bebeto, is a Brazilian professional footballer who plays as a right-back for Primeira Liga club Tondela.

== Career statistics ==
As of 23 March 2017

Club	Season	League			State league		Cup		Continental		Other		Total	
Club	Season	Division	Apps	Goals	Apps	Goals	Apps	Goals	Apps	Goals	Apps	Goals	Apps	Goals
Bahia	2009	Série B	8	0	—		—		—		—		8	0
Bahia	2010	Série B	1	0	4	0	—		—		—		5	0
Bahia	Subtotal		9	0	4	0	—		—		—		13	0
Bahia de Feira	2011	Baiano	—		9	0	—		—		—		9	0
Paulista	2012	Paulista	—		—		—		—		9 (Note: All appearance(s) in Copa Paulista)	0	9	0
Caxias	2014	Série C	14	0	13	0	—		—		—		27	0
Caxias	2015	Série C	13	0	8	0	1	0	—		—		22	0
Caxias	Subtotal		27	0	21	0	1	0	—		—		49	0
São Bento	2016	Série D	1	0	11	0	—		—		—		12	0
São Bento	2017	Série C	0	0	8	0	1	0	—		—		9	0
São Bento	Subtotal		1	0	19	0	1	0	—		—		21	0
Maritimo	2017	LIGA NOS	32	4	11	0	—		—		—		12	0
Career total			37	0	53	0	2	0	0	0	9	0	101	0
