= Zainadine Júnior =

Mozambican footballer

Personal information
- Full name: Zainadine Abdula Chavango Júnior
- Date of birth: 24 June 1988 (age 38)
- Place of birth: Maputo, Mozambique
- Height: 1.80 m (5 ft 11 in)
- Position: Centre-back

Senior career*
Years	Team	Apps	(Gls)
2008–2011	Desportivo Maputo	73	(5)
2011–2013	Liga Muçulmana		
2013–2015	Nacional	72	(2)
2016–2017	Tianjin Teda	26	(1)
2017	→ Marítimo (loan)	15	(1)
2017–2024	Marítimo	182	(5)

International career^{‡}
2008–	Mozambique	64	(1)
- * Club domestic league appearances and goals as of 2 July 2024 ‡ National team caps and goals as of 24 March 2023

Zainadine Abdula Chavango Júnior (born 24 June 1988) is a Mozambican professional footballer who plays as a centre-back.

He spent most of his career in Portugal with rivals Nacional and Marítimo, making over 250 Primeira Liga appearances.

A full international with over 60 caps for Mozambique since 2008, he represented the country at the 2010 Africa Cup of Nations.

== Club career ==
Born in Maputo, Zainadine Júnior began his career with local Desportivo Maputo and Liga Muçulmana de Maputo. In late 2009, he and compatriot Mexer trialled at Sporting CP, but only the latter ended up signing.

In August 2013, Zainadine Júnior finally got his move to Portugal's Primeira Liga, joining C.D. Nacional. He made his debut on 22 September in a 1–0 home win over Académica de Coimbra, in which he assisted the goal by Mario Rondón. In 20 appearances as the team from Funchal secured fifth place and UEFA Europa League qualification, he scored once on 8 December to secure a 2–2 draw in the Madeira derby away to C.S. Marítimo.

After playing the 2016 Chinese Super League with Tianjin Teda FC, Zainadine Júnior returned to Portugal's top flight on loan to Marítimo. The team ended the season in sixth and qualified for Europe, with him scoring the equaliser in a 3–1 home win over F.C. Arouca on 19 March; the goal was voted the league's best of the month.

In July 2017, Zainadine Júnior rescinded his contract with Tianjin to sign for Marítimo. Two years later, he signed a new deal to keep him with the Rubro-Verdes until 2022. In April 2022, he signed a new two-year deal.

== International career ==
Zainadine Júnior was called up to represent Mozambique at the 2010 Africa Cup of Nations, where he was unused in a group stage elimination in Angola.

He scored his one international goal on 8 September 2018 in a 2019 Africa Cup of Nations qualifier at home to Guinea-Bissau, opening a 2–2 draw.

=== International goals ===
Scores and results list Mozambique's goal tally first.

No.	Date	Venue	Opponent	Score	Result	Competition
1.	8 September 2018	Estádio do Zimpeto, Maputo, Mozambique	Guinea-Bissau	1–0	2–2	2019 Africa Cup of Nations qualification
