= Fábio China =

Portuguese footballer (born 1992)

Personal information
- Full name: Fábio Diogo Agrela Ferreira
- Date of birth: 7 July 1992 (age 34)
- Place of birth: Calheta, Portugal
- Height: 1.79 m (5 ft 10 1/2 in)
- Position: Left-back

Team information
- Current team: Camacha

Youth career
- 2001–2010: Prazeres

Senior career*
Years	Team	Apps	(Gls)
2010–2011	Futsal		
2011−2014	Estrela Calheta	50	(11)
2014−2015	Marítimo C	29	(0)
2015−2020	Marítimo B	42	(2)
2016–2025	Marítimo	153	(2)
2025–	Camacha	27	(0)
- * Club domestic league appearances and goals as of 15:00, 11 October 2026 (UTC)

Fábio Diogo Agrela Ferreira (born 7 July 1992), known as Fábio China, is a Portuguese professional footballer who plays as a left-back for Camacha.

== Club career ==
Born in Calheta, Madeira, China began playing at A.D.R. Prazeres. When the opportunity arose to move to Estrela da Calheta FC, his chairman did not authorise the transfer due to bad blood between the two clubs; he played competitive futsal until the situation was resolved.

China had trialled unsuccessfully on several occasions at C.S. Marítimo, but was taken on by the C team under his former Calheta manager Nélson Gouveia, and signed a professional deal in January 2015 at age 22. He made his debut in the Primeira Liga on 15 May 2016 at the end of the season, playing the entirety of a 2–1 away loss against Moreirense F.C. under the management of Nelo Vingada.

China missed the middle of the 2016–17 campaign due to a three-month pubalgia. On 10 February 2018, he was sent off in a 3–0 defeat at Rio Ave FC. In May 2021, when his contract was due to expire, it was extended for two years.

In 2022–23, China played only ten times as Marítimo were relegated, with most of his appearances being as a substitute for Vítor Costa. Nonetheless, at the season's end, he was rewarded with a two-year extension.

On 27 October 2024, with the side now in the Liga Portugal 2 following their 2023 relegation, China scored his first goal as a professional, opening an eventual 3–1 away win over newly-promoted F.C. Felgueiras. He left the Estádio do Marítimo in July 2025, with 170 competitive appearances to his credit.

China remained in the island for the 2025–26 campaign, signing with fourth division club A.D. Camacha.
