= Edgar Costa =

Portuguese footballer (born 1987)

Personal information
- Full name: José Edgar Andrade da Costa
- Date of birth: 14 April 1987 (age 39)
- Place of birth: Câmara de Lobos, Portugal
- Height: 1.78 m (5 ft 10 in)
- Positions: Forward; winger

Youth career
- 1995–2000: Estreito
- 2000–2006: União Madeira

Senior career*
| Years | Team | Apps | (Gls) |
| 2006–2009 | União Madeira | 78 | (7) |
| 2009–2014 | Nacional | 56 | (5) |
| 2013–2014 | → Moreirense (loan) | 14 | (2) |
| 2014–2024 | Marítimo | 230 | (16) |
| 2015–2024 | Marítimo B | 6 | (0) |
| Total | | 384 | (30) |

International career
| 2005 | Portugal U19 | 2 | (0) |
- * Club domestic league appearances and goals

José Edgar Andrade da Costa (born 14 April 1987) is a Portuguese former professional footballer who played as a forward or winger.

He played 284 Primeira Liga games and scored 21 goals for Nacional and Marítimo, having started his career with a third team from Madeira, União.

== Club career ==
=== Nacional ===
Born in Câmara de Lobos, Madeira, Costa finished his development at local C.F. União. He made his senior debut with the club in 2006, and played three third-division seasons with it.

Costa joined neighbouring C.D. Nacional in summer 2009, appearing in 14 games in his first season in the Primeira Liga (nine as a substitute) and scoring two goals as the team finished in seventh position. His debut in the competition came on 12 September 2009, playing 25 minutes in a 2–0 away loss against Rio Ave FC.

On 14 July 2011, Costa scored on his continental debut in the second qualifying round of the UEFA Europa League, opening a 1–1 draw away to Iceland's Fimleikafélag Hafnarfjarðar. In January 2012 he spent a week on trial at West Ham United, but nothing came of it.

In summer 2013, Costa was loaned to Moreirense F.C. of the Segunda Liga. He scored in wins at S.L. Benfica B (2–1) and C.D. Feirense (4–0) for the eventual champions.

=== Marítimo ===
Costa subsequently returned to the Portuguese top tier with C.S. Marítimo. On 27 November 2015, he was sent off in a 3–1 loss at Nacional in the Madeira derby; in the reverse fixture on 2 April he scored a volley to open a 2–0 win. He was named captain before the start of 2016–17, and signed new contracts in November 2016 and June 2019.

On 12 January 2020, Costa played his 200th top-flight game in a goalless draw with Vitória de Guimarães. Starting from that August, he signed three one-year contract extensions.

In January 2023, Costa accused his agent Miguel Pinho of attempting to bribe him to lose to S.L. Benfica.

== International career ==
Costa represented Portugal at under-19 level.

== Personal life ==
Costa's younger sister, Érica (born 1995), played in the same position for Marítimo's women's team.

== Honours ==
Moreirense

- Segunda Liga: 2013–14
