= C.S. Marítimo B =

Portuguese association football reserve team

Marítimo B
- Full name: Club Sport Marítimo B
- Nicknames: Os Verde-Rubros (The Green-and-Red); Os Leões (The Lions)
- Founded: 1999
- Ground: Campo da Imaculada Conceição, Funchal
- Capacity: 1,824
- Chairman: Carlos Pereira
- Manager: José Pedro Jacinto
- League: AF Madeira 1ª Divisão
- 2021–22: Campeonato de Portugal Serie A, 2nd (First stage); Promotion North zone, 6th (Second stage)
- Website: www.csmaritimo.org.pt
Home colours	Away colours

Club Sport Marítimo B is a Portuguese football club that currently plays in the AF Madeira 1ª Divisão. They are the reserve team of Club Sport Marítimo. They play their home games at the Campo da Imaculada Conceição in the suburb of Santo António in Funchal, Madeira.

Established in 1999, the squad is the reserve team for the first team, who compete in the top-tier and, as such, they are restricted from promotion to the Primeira Liga, the top-tier professional league, nor are they allowed to compete in the Cup of Portugal and League Cup either. Players from the first team can be dropped down to the B team though as has happened on many occasions, and vice versa.

The team registered for the AF Madeira 1ª Divisão for the 2025–26 season, with a focus integrating academy players into senior football.

== Current squad ==
As of 3 May 2020

Note: Flags indicate national team as defined under FIFA eligibility rules; some limited exceptions apply. Players may hold more than one non-FIFA nationality.

No.	Pos.	Nation	Player
11	FW	POR	André Teles
14	MF	MLI	Mamadou Traoré
16	MF	POR	André Teles
20	FW	BRA	Jefferson
21	DF	POR	Jake Gonçalves
22	FW	MOZ	Gildo Vilanculos
26	MF	BRA	Aloísio Genézio
32	DF	MOZ	Bonera
34	FW	GHA	Johnson Oppong Owusu
35	DF	POR	Miguel Rosário
36	MF	POR	Miguel Sousa
38	FW	ANG	Milson
45	DF	POR	Fábio China
47	DF	BRA	Magrão
55	DF	POR	Nandinho

No.	Pos.	Nation	Player
62	GK	POR	Tiago Teixeira
66	DF	BRA	Léo Andrade
67	DF	POR	Hugo Meireles
68	MF	COL	Juan Mosquera
70	DF	POR	Cristiano Gomes
74	DF	POR	Cristiano Abreu
76	GK	CAN	Matthew Nogueira
77	FW	POR	Diogo Firmino
78	FW	BRA	Henrique Silva
82	FW	POR	André Mesquita
86	MF	POR	João Tentugal
89	FW	POR	Nassur Bacem
90	FW	POR	Tiago Nunes
97	DF	BRA	Aloísio Neto
99	GK	POR	Pedro Mateus
