= 2020–21 Taça de Portugal =

Taça de Portugal Placard

Tournament details
- Country: Portugal
- Dates: 26 September 2020 – 23 May 2021
- Teams: 165

Final positions
- Champions: Braga (3rd title)
- Runners-up: Benfica

Tournament statistics
- Matches played: 166
- Goals scored: 487 (2.93 per match)
- Top goal scorer(s): Abel Ruiz (7 goals)

The 2020–21 Taça de Portugal (also known as Taça de Portugal Placard for sponsorship reasons) was the 81st edition of the Taça de Portugal, the premier knockout competition in Portuguese football. A total of 165 clubs compete in this edition, including all teams from the top three tiers of the Portuguese football league system – excluding reserve or B teams, which are not eligible – and representatives of the fourth-tier District leagues and cups. The competition began on 26 September 2020 with the first-round matches involving teams from the third and fourth tiers, and concluded on 23 May 2021 with the final at the Estádio Nacional in Oeiras.

Primeira Liga side Porto were the defending champions and entered the competition in the third round, but they were eliminated by eventual winners Braga in the semi-finals. Braga beat Benfica 2–0 in the final to win their third title.

== Format ==
Round	Clubs remaining	Clubs involved	Winners from previous round	New entries this round	Leagues entering at this round (tier)
First round	165	131	none	131	Campeonato de Portugal (3rd): 88 teams District Football Associations (4th): 43 teams
Second round	110	92	55+21	16	LigaPro (2nd): 16 teams
Third round	64	64	46	18	Primeira Liga (1st): 18 teams
Fourth round	32	32	32	none	none
Fifth round	16	16	16	none	none
Quarter-finals	8	8	8	none	none
Semi-finals	4	4	4	none	none
Final	2	2	2	none	none

== Teams ==
A total of 165 teams compete in the 2021–21 edition, comprising 18 teams from the Primeira Liga (tier 1), 16 teams from the LigaPro (tier 2), 88 teams from the Campeonato de Portugal (tier 3) and 43 teams from the District championships and cups (tier 4). (Note: Reserve teams are not allowed to compete in cups. For this reason, Benfica B and Porto B, who play in LigaPro, Belenenses SAD B, Braga B, Marítimo B, Rio Ave B, Sporting CP B and Vitória de Guimarães B, who play in Campeonato de Portugal, did not compete in this tournament.)

=== Primeira Liga ===
- Belenenses SAD
- Benfica
- Boavista
- Braga
- Famalicão
- Farense
- Gil Vicente
- Marítimo
- Moreirense
- Nacional
- Paços de Ferreira
- Porto
- Portimonense
- Rio Ave
- Santa Clara
- Sporting CP
- Tondela
- Vitória de Guimarães

=== LigaPro ===
- Académica
- Académico de Viseu
- Arouca
- Casa Pia
- Chaves
- Cova da Piedade
- Estoril
- Feirense
- Leixões
- Mafra
- Oliveirense
- Penafiel
- Sp. Covilhã
- Varzim
- Vilafranquense
- Vizela

=== Campeonato de Portugal ===
Series A

- Águia Vimioso
- Bragança
- Cerveira
- Maria da Fonte
- Merelinense
- Mirandela
- Montalegre
- Vianense
- Vidago
- Vilaverdense

Series B

- Berço
- Brito
- Camacha
- Desportivo das Aves
- Fafe
- Felgueiras
- Mondinense
- Pevidém
- São Martinho
- Tirsense

Series C

- Amarante
- Câmara de Lobos
- Coimbrões
- Gondomar
- Leça
- Paredes
- Pedras Rubras
- Salgueiros
- Trofense
- União da Madeira
- Vila Real

Series D

- Águeda
- Anadia
- Beira-Mar
- Canelas
- Castro Daire
- Espinho
- Lusitânia Lourosa
- Lusitano Vildemoinhos
- Sanjoanense
- São João de Ver
- Valadares
- Vila Cortez

Series E

- Alcains
- Benfica Castelo Branco
- Carapinheirense
- Condeixa
- GRAP
- Marinhense
- Mortágua
- Oleiros
- Oliveira do Hospital
- Sertanense
- União de Leiria
- Vitória de Sernache

Series F

- 1.º de Dezembro
- Alverca
- Caldas
- Fátima
- Loures
- Lourinhanense
- Pêro Pinheiro
- Sacavenense
- Sintrense
- Torreense
- União de Almeirim
- União de Santarém

Series G

- Estrela da Amadora
- Fabril Barreiro
- Fontinhas
- Olímpico Montijo
- Oriental de Lisboa
- Oriental Dragon
- Praiense
- Rabo de Peixe
- Real
- Sporting Ideal

Series H

- Aljustrelense
- Amora
- Esperança de Lagos
- Juventude de Évora
- Louletano
- Lusitano de Évora
- Moncarapachense
- Moura
- Olhanense
- Pinhalnovense
- Vitória de Setúbal

=== District Championships ===
Algarve FA

- Ferreiras (3rd)
- Culatrense (4th)

Angra do Heroísmo FA

- Guadalupe
- Lusitânia dos Açores

Aveiro FA

- Ovarense (2nd)
- Calvão

Beja FA

- Vasco da Gama da Vidigueira (2nd)
- Praia Milfontes (3rd)

Braga FA

- Amares
- Caçadores das Taipas

Bragança FA

- Rebordelo (2nd)
- Estudantes Africanos (3rd)

Castelo Branco FA

- Águias do Moradal (2nd)
- Idanhense (4th)

Coimbra FA

- Tocha (2nd)
- Ançã (3rd)

Évora FA

- União Montemor (2nd)
- Lusitano de Évora

Guarda FA

- Mêda (1st)
- Aguiar da Beira

Horta FA

- Fayal
- Madalena

Leiria FA

- Portomosense (3rd)
- Alqueidão da Serra

Lisbon FA

- Atlético (3rd)
- Ericeirense (4th)

Madeira FA

- Porto da Cruz

Ponta Delgada FA

- São Roque Açores
- Vale Formoso

Portalegre FA

- Crato (1st)
- Portalegrense (2nd)

Porto FA

- Foz
- Vila Meã

Santarém FA

- Fazendense (2nd)
- Tomar

Setúbal FA

- Barreirense (2nd)
- Sesimbra (3rd)

Viana do Castelo FA

- Limianos (2nd)
- Desportivo de Monção

Vila Real FA

- Vilar de Perdizes
- Santa Marta de Penaguião

Viseu FA

- Cinfães (2nd)
- Ferreira das Aves (3rd)

Note: 1st/2nd/3rd/4th: final placing in championship at the time of interruption.

== Schedule ==
All draws are held at the Portuguese Football Federation (FPF) headquarters in Oeiras. Match kick-off times are in WET (UTC±0) from the third round to the semi-finals, and in WEST (UTC+1) during the rest of the competition. The schedule was published along with all national men competitions on 13 August 2020.

Round	Draw date	Date(s)	Fixtures	Teams	Prize money (Note: These values don't include television transmission fee.)
First round	10 September 2020	26–27 September 2020	55	165 → 110	€3,000
Second round	29 September 2020	9–11 October 2020	46	110 → 64	€4,000
Third round	22 October 2020	20–22 November 2020	32	64 → 32	€5,000
Fourth round	25 November 2020	12–13 December 2020	16	32 → 16	€6,000
Fifth round	16 December 2020	12–14 January 2021	8	16 → 8	€9,000
Quarter-finals	16 December 2020	27–29 January 2021	4	8 → 4	€12,000
Semi-finals	16 December 2020	10–11 February 2021 (1st leg); 3–4 March 2021 (2nd leg)	4	4 → 2	€17,500
Final	16 December 2020	23 May 2021	1	2 → 1	€300,000 (losing finalist) €700,000 (winner)

== First round ==
A total of 131 teams representing the Campeonato de Portugal and the District Championships were involved in the first round draw, which was held on 10 September 2020. Twenty-one teams received a bye to the second round and the remaining teams were split into eight series according to geographical proximity. These teams were then paired inside their series, with the first team drawn playing at home.

Byes

The following twenty-one teams received a bye to the second round:

- Esperança de Lagos (3)
- Merelinense (3)
- Vitória de Setúbal (3)
- Ovarense (4)
- Águeda (3)
- Caldas (3)
- Mortágua (3)
- Fontinhas (3)
- Vidago (3)
- Olímpico Montijo (3)
- Amora (3)
- Vilar de Perdizes (4)
- Desportivo de Monção (4)
- Estudantes Africanos (4)
- Rebordelo (4)
- Salgueiros (3)
- Idanhense (4)
- União de Montemor (4)
- Espinho (3)
- Sesimbra (4)
- Oriental Lisboa (3)

Matches

26 September 2020 Serie A	Amares (4)	0–1	(3) Vianense	Ferreiros, Amares
15:00		Report	Leandro Boas 90'	Stadium: Parque Desportivo Engº José Carlos Macedo; Referee: João Afonso

26 September 2020 Serie A	Berço (3)	1–2	(3) Vilaverdense	Candoso, Guimarães
16:00	Valentin Remy 34'	Report	Rafa 4' (pen.); Eduardo Barros 49'	Stadium: Campo Gémeos Castro; Referee: António Moreira

26 September 2020 Serie A	Bragança (3)	0–1	(4) Limianos	Bragança
19:00		Report	Fábio Pimenta 45' (pen.)	Stadium: Estádio Municipal de Bragança; Referee: Albano Correia

27 September 2020 Serie A	Cerveira (3)	2–0	(3) Brito	Estádio Municipal Rafael Pedreira
15:00	Diogo Carrilho 40'; Hugo Costa 64' (pen.)	Report		Referee: João Carvalho

27 September 2020 Serie A	Águia Vimioso (3)	1–2 (a.e.t.)	(3) Mirandela	Vimioso
15:00	Miguel Diz 64' (pen.)	Report	João Dias 89'; Kenedy Co 93'	Stadium: Estádio Municipal do Vimioso; Referee: Carlos Teixeira

27 September 2020 Serie A	Maria da Fonte (3)	1–2	(3) Montalegre	Póvoa de Lanhoso
15:00	Luiz Sousa 5'	Report	Vilmar Júnior 18'; Miguel Faria 54' (pen.)	Stadium: Campo Moinhos Novos; Referee: Bruno Costa

27 September 2020 Serie A	Caçadores das Taipas (4)	0–3	(3) Fafe	Caldas das Taipas
15:00		Report	José Oliveira 36'; Jorge Monteiro 66'; Paulo Araújo 72'	Stadium: Campo Montinho; Referee: Daniel Cardoso

26 September 2020 Serie B	A.D. Porto da Cruz (4)	1–4	(3) Camacha	Funchal
15:00	João Silva 90'	Report	José Teles 18'; Higor Félix 46'; António Andrade 72'; Matheus Troche 84'	Stadium: Campo Adelino Rodrigues; Referee: Sérgio Guelho

27 September 2020 Serie B	Trofense (3)	0–0 (a.e.t.) (7–6 p)	(4) Vila Meã	Trofa
15:00		Report		Stadium: Estádio do C.D. Trofense; Referee: Sérgio Soares

27 September 2020 Serie B	São Martinho (3)	2–0 (a.e.t.)	(3) Pevidém	Campo Comendador Abílio Ferreira Oliveira
15:00	Emmanuel Dass 94'; Tiago Valente 105'	Report		Referee: Eduardo Ribeiro

27 September 2020 Serie B	Pedras Rubras (3)	2–1 (a.e.t.)	(3) Amarante	Telha, Pedras Rubras
15:00	Tiago Silva 33' (pen.); Everton Silva 108'	Report	Diogo Marques 12'	Stadium: Estádio Municipal de Pedras Rubras; Referee: João Pinho

27 September 2020 Serie B	Vila Real (3)	1–0 (a.e.t.)	(3) Mondinense	Parada de Cunhos, Vila Real
15:00	Abel Pereira 117' (pen.)	Report		Stadium: Complexo Desportivo do Monte da Forca; Referee: Marco Cruz

27 September 2020 Serie B	Felgueiras (3)	w/o	(3) Desportivo das Aves	Felgueiras
15:00		Report		Stadium: Estádio Municipal Dr. Machado Matos; Referee: Duarte Oliveira

7 October 2020 Serie B	União da Madeira (3)	0–5	(3) Tirsense	Funchal
20:00		Report	Pedro Garcia 10', 58', 68'; Diogo Cardoso 12'; João Martins 26'	Stadium: Cristian Ronaldo Campus

27 September 2020 Serie C	São João de Ver (3)	1–0	(3) Lusitânia Lourosa	São João de Ver
15:00	Carlos Semedo 34'	Report		Stadium: Estádio do S.C. São João de Ver; Referee: João Costa

27 September 2020 Serie C	Gondomar (3)	7–0	(4) Mêda	São Cosme, Gondomar
15:00	Hugo Pereira 33'; Ângelo Oliveira 48'; Thierno Niang 55', 64'; Jorge Monteiro 66'; Cláudio Silva 87', 90'	Report		Stadium: Estádio S. Miguel; Referee: Xavier Gomes

27 September 2020 Serie C	Coimbrões (3)	1–2	(3) Valadares	Coimbrões, Santa Marinha
15:0	João Santos 55'	Report	António Tavares 6' (o.g.); Abdoullahi Tanko 9'	Stadium: Parque Silva Matos; Referee: Anzhony Rodrigues

27 September 2020 Serie C	Paredes (3)	1–0	(3) Castro Daire	Paredes
15:00	Cláudio Madureira 8' (pen.)	Report		Stadium: Cidade Desportiva de Paredes; Referee: Marco Pereira

27 September 2020 Serie C	Canelas (3)	2–0	(4) Foz	Canelas
15:00	Francisco Sousa 21' (pen.); Juan Palacios 90'	Report		Stadium: Estádio do Canelas Gaia F.C. Referee: Edgar baptista

27 September 2020 Serie C	St. Marta de Penaguião (4)	2–0	(4) Cinfães	Santa Marta de Penaguião
15:00	Luís Esteves 65', 73'	Report		Stadium: Estádio Municipal de Santa Marta de Penaguião; Referee: José Bessa

27 September 2020 Serie C	Câmara de Lobos (3)	2–1	(3) Leça	Câmara de Lobos
15:00	Célio Reis 1'; Dino Rodrigues 57' (pen.)	Report	Marcos Júnior 42'	Stadium: Estádio de Câmara de Lobos; Referee: André Neto

26 September 2020 Serie D	Beira-Mar (3)	1–0	(3) Oliveira do Hospital	Aveiro
19:00	Diego Raposo 64'	Report		Stadium: Estádio Municipal de Aveiro; Referee: Hélder Patrick Marques

27 September 2020 Serie D	Ferreira das Aves (4)	0–1	(3) Sanjoanense	Lamas de Ferreira de Aves
15:00		Report	Elder Conceição 90' (pen.)	Stadium: Estádio Montragão; Referee: Rui Silva

27 September 2020 Serie D	Anadia (3)	2–0 (a.e.t.)	(3) Condeixa	Anadia
15:00	Pedro Silva 97'; José Lopes 106'	Report		Stadium: Estádio Engº Sílvio Henriques Cerveira; Referee: Tiago Sá

27 September 2020 Serie D	Calvão (4)	0–1	(4) Carapinheirense	Calvão
15:00		Report	Ricardo Faria 90'	Stadium: Campo Padre Baptista; Referee: Fábio Loureiro

27 September 2020 Serie D	Ançã (4)	3–1	(4) Tocha	Ançã
15:00	Samuel Santos 25'; André Gonçalo 34' (pen.); Bernardo Oliveira 69'	Report	Gonçalo Simões 90'	Stadium: Parque Desportivo de Ançã; Referee: Eduardo Rocha

27 September 2020 Serie D	Aguiar da Beira (4)	1–4	(3) Vila Cortez	Aguiar da Beira
15:00	Nuno Moreira 62' (pen.)	Report	Hugo Vaz 51'; Rui Santos 54'; Rafael Santos 67'; André Jesus 88' (pen.)	Stadium: Estádio Municipal de Aguiar da Beira; Referee: Fernando Ferreira

27 September 2020 Serie D	Lusitano Vildemoinhos (3)	0–0 (a.e.t.) (6–5 p)	(4) Águias do Moradal	Vildemoinhos, Viseu
15:00		Report		Stadium: Campo dos Trambelos; Referee: Fábio Silva

27 September 2020 Serie E	Alcains (3)	2–2 (a.e.t.) (3–4 p)	(3) Vitória de Sernache	Alcains
15:00	Diogo Peteiz 2' (o.g.); João Martins 90'	Report	Luccas Marques 25'; Jair Silva 62'	Stadium: Campo Trigueiros Aragão; Referee: João Mendes

27 September 2020 Serie E	Tomar (3)	2–3	(4) A.D. Portomosense	Tomar
15:00	Cláudio Major 45'; Tiago Vieira 81'	Report	Luccas Marques 34' (pen.), 55'; Dany Marques 45'	Stadium: Estádio Municipal de Tomar; Referee: André Castro

27 September 2020 Serie E	Sertanense (3)	1–0	(3) Benfica Castelo Branco	Sertã
15:00	Bruno Rafael 56' (o.g.)	Report		Stadium: Campo Dr. Marques Santos; Referee: Pedro Ramalho

27 September 2020 Serie E	GRAP (3)	2–1	(4) Alqueidão da Serra	Campo da Charneca
15:00	Rafael Souza 12'; Marcos Cabral 27'	Report	Vasco Gonçalves 17' (pen.)	Referee: Luís Filipe

27 September 2020 Serie E	Crato (4)	0–4	(3) União de Leiria	Gáfete, Crato
15:00		Report	André Leal 31'; Rui Gomes 57', 65', 67'	Stadium: Estádio Municipal de Gáfete; Referee: Renato Gonçalves

27 September 2020 Serie E	Portalegrense (4)	0–11	(3) Marinhense	Portalegre
15:00		Report	Miguel Vinagre 14'; Miguel Velosa 26', 41', 61'; Jean Angulo 31'; Ricardo Canário 33' (o.g.); Gilberto Seidi 37', 45' (pen.); Cláudio Ribeiro 65' (pen.), 78'; João Silva 85'	Stadium: Estádio Municipal de Portalegre; Referee: Luís Máximo

27 September 2020 Serie E	Fátima (3)	0–3	(3) Oleiros	Complexo Desportivo Ribeiro Ferreira
15:00		Report	Rúben Silva 33'; Marcelo Moreira 45'; Marcelo Dias 71'	Referee: Tiago Pinto

27 September 2020 Serie F	Pêro Pinheiro (3)	1–0 (a.e.t.)	(3) Praiense	Pêro Pinheiro
15:00	Cláudio Anjos 118'	Report		Stadium: Campo Pardal Monteiro; Referee: Gonçalo Carreira

27 September 2020 Serie F	Sacavenense (3)	2–0	(3) Sintrense	Sacavém
15:00	Carlos Pinto 56' (pen.); Malam Fati 65'	Report		Stadium: Complexo Desportivo Elias Pereira; Referee: Bruno Vieira

27 September 2020 Serie F	Torreense (3)	3–0	(3) União de Almeirim	Torres Vedras
16:00	Filipe Andrade 35', 72'; Ricardo António 47'	Report		Stadium: Campo Manuel Marques; Referee: João Marques

27 September 2020 Serie F	Alverca (3)	w/o	(4) Guadalupe	Alverca do Ribatejo
15:00		Report		Stadium: Campo do F.C. Alverca

21 October 2020 Serie F	Lourinhanense (3)	0–3	(3) União de Santarém	Lourinhã
15:00				Stadium: Estádio Municipal da Lourinhã

7 October 2020 Serie F	Fazendense (4)	0–2	(3) 1.º de Dezembro	Almeirim
19:30		Report	Filipe Assunção 48'; Camilo Fragozo 90'	Stadium: Estádio Municipal de Almeirim

7 October 2020 Serie F	Ericeirense (4)	0–3	(3) Loures	Ericeira
21:00		Report	Paulo Tavares 20' (pen.); Afonso Simão 49'; José Semedo 74'	Stadium: Campo Eng. Ministro Santos

27 September 2020 Serie G	Sp. Ideal (3)	4–0	(4) F.C. Vale Formoso	Ribeira Grande
15:00	Douglas Santos 32', 48' (pen.); Igor Gomes 49'; Bernardo Fortunato 74'	Report		Stadium: Estádio Municipal da Ribeira Grande; Referee: Fábio Nunes

27 September 2020 Serie G	São Roque Açores (4)	0–3	(3) Estrela da Amadora	São Roque, Ponta Delgada
15:00		Report	Luís Mota 46'; Paollo Oliveira 70'; Filipe Gaspar 90'	Stadium: Campo de Jogos São Roque; Referee: Hélder Carvalho

27 September 2020 Serie G	Fabril Barreiro (3)	2–0	(3) Rabo de Peixe	Lavradio, Barreiro
15:00	Edson Castro 73'; Jackson Souza 79'	Report		Stadium: Estádio Alfredo Silva; Referee: Carlos Espadinha

27 September 2020 Serie G	Pinhalnovense (3)	2–0	(4) Atlético CP	Pinhal Novo
15:00	Diogo Tavares 24'; Miguel Pires 33'	Report		Stadium: Campo de Jogos Santos Jorge; Referee: Rui Soares

27 September 2020 Serie G	Real SC (3)	w/o	(4) Lusitânia dos Açores	Massamá, Queluz
15:00		Report		Stadium: Campo nº 1 do Real SC

27 September 2020 Serie G	Oriental Dragon (3)	w/o	(4) Fayal	Moita
15:00		Report		Stadium: Juncal Desportos

27 September 2020 Serie G	Barreirense (4)	w/o	(4) Madalena	Barreiro
15:00		Report		Stadium: Campo Verderena

27 September 2020 Serie H	Aljustrelense (3)	1–0 (a.e.t.)	(4) Praia Milfontes	Aljustrel
15:00	Miguel Ruas 110'	Report		Stadium: Estádio Municipal de Aljustrel; Referee: Sérgio Jesus

27 September 2020 Serie H	Lusitano de Évora (4)	0–0 (a.e.t.) (3–4 p)	(3) Moncarapachense	Évora
15:00		Report		Stadium: Campo Estrela; Referee: Gonçalo Nunes

27 September 2020 Serie H	Olhanense (3)	0–2	(3) Lusitano Ginásio Clube de Évora	Olhão
15:00		Report	Diogo Conceição 57'; Hélio Vaz 88'	Stadium: Estádio José Arcanjo; Referee: Ricardo Diogo

27 September 2020 Serie H	Vasco da Gama da Vidigueira (4)	1–2 (a.e.t.)	(3) Juventude de Évora	Vidigueira
15:00	Rafael Viana 37' (o.g.)	Report	Rivaldo Semedo 22'; Matheus Pranke 95'	Stadium: Estádio Municipal da Vidigueira; Referee: João Bernardo

5 October 2020 Serie H	Moura (3)	2–0	(4) Culatrense	Moura
15:00	Lucas Ramos 7'; Lucas Santos 67'	Report		Stadium: Estádio do Moura A.C.

7 October 2020 Serie H	Ferreiras (4)	2–2 (a.e.t.) (5–4 p)	(3) Louletano	Ferreiras
20:45	João Romeiro 50'; Edinho Junior 87' (pen.)	Report	Nuno Moreira 17'; Abou Toure 32'	Stadium: Estádio Nora

== Second round ==
A total of 92 teams were involved in the second round draw, which was held on 10 September 2020. The 16 teams from the Liga Portugal 2 joined the 55 winners from first round and the 21 teams that received a bye to the second round. All Liga Portugal 2 teams played this round as visitors.

Number of teams per tier entering this round
Primeira Liga (1)	Liga Portugal 2 (2)	Campeonato de Portugal (3)	District Championships (4)	Total
18 / 18	16 / 16	61 / 88	15 / 43	110 / 165

9 October 2020	Sertanense (3)	0–4	(2) Estoril	Sertã
11:00		Report	André Filho 8'; Hugo Gomes 37'; Abdul Yakubu 67', 90' (pen.)	Stadium: Campo do Dr. Marques dos Santos; Referee: André Narciso

10 October 2020	Caldas (3)	1–1 (a.e.t.) (4–5 p)	(2) Sporting da Covilhã	Caldas da Rainha
14:00	Ricardo Damaso 35'	Report	Jaime Simões 50'	Stadium: Campo da Mata; Referee: Gustavo Correia

10 October 2020	Ovarense (4)	1–2 (a.e.t.)	(3) Oriental Dragon	Ovar
15:00	Joãozinho 84'	Report	Martim Águas 15'; Bruno Grou 105'	Stadium: Estádio Marques da Silva

10 October 2020	União de Montemor (4)	0–2	(2) Feirense	Montemor-o-Novo
15:00		Report	João Tavares 26'; Feliz 66'	Stadium: Estádio 1º de Maio

10 October 2020	Vidago (4)	1–5	(2) Vilafranquense	Vidago
15:00	Elias Corrêa 84'	Report	Rodrigo Rodrigues 43' (pen.), 88', 90+3' (pen.); André Dias 68'; André Claro 90+1'	Stadium: Campo João de Oliveira; Referee: Claudio Pereira

10 October 2020	Esperança de Lagos (3)	1–3	(2) Penafiel	Lagos
16:00	Zé Maria 11'	Report	Pedro Soares 25'; Gustavo Henrique 41'; Júnior Franco 90'	Stadium: Clube de Futebol Esperança de Lagos; Referee: Ricardo Baixinho

10 October 2020	Fontinhas (3)	1–0	(2) Mafra	Fontinhas
16:00	Daniel Esteves 90+3'	Report		Stadium: Estádio Municipal Praia da Vitória; Referee: David Silva

10 October 2020	Estrela da Amadora (3)	2–0	(3) Lusitano Vildemoinhos	Oeiras
18:00	Luis Mota 56'; Braima Jau 84'	Report		Stadium: Estádio Nacional; Referee: David Salvador

11 October 2020	Juventude de Évora (3)	1–3	(2) Académica de Coimbra	Évora
11:00	Xande 90+2'	Report	Bruno Teles 57'; Leandro Sanca 77'; Etienne 86'	Stadium: Estádio Sanches de Miranda; Referee: Flávio Lima

11 October 2020	1º de Dezembro (3)	2–3	(3) União de Leiria	Sintra
15:00	Dezumbero 75'	Report	Massaias 89'; Galo 90'	Stadium: Campo Conde de Sucena; Referee: Paulo Raposo

11 October 2020	Portomosense (4)	0–3	(3) Real	Porto de Mós
15:00		Report	Magno 56' (pen.); Batalha 72'; Salvador 86'	Stadium: Parque de Jogos de Porto de Mós; Referee: Sérgio Guelho

11 October 2020	Amora (3)	1–0 (a.e.t.)	(4) Ferreiras	Amora
15:00		Report	Valdu Te 116' (pen.)	Stadium: Estádio da Medideira; Referee: Anzhony Rodrigues

11 October 2020	Ançã (4)	2–2 (a.e.t.) (3–4 p)	(3) Sacavense	Ançã
15:00	Hugo Parreiral 19' (pen.); Pedro Gonçalves 70' (pen.)	Report	Malam Fati 59', 72'	Stadium: Parque Desportivo de Ança; Referee: Xavier Gomes

11 October 2020	Câmara de Lobos (3)	0–2	(2) Vizela	Câmara de Lobos
15:00		Report	Samu 45+2'; Fernando Cardozo 56' (pen.)	Stadium: Estádio de Câmara de Lobos; Referee: Marcos Brazão

11 October 2020	Carapinheirense (3)	0–2	(3) Pinhalnovense	Montemor-o-Velho
15:00		Report	Miguel Pires 69'; Celestino 90' (pen.)	Stadium: Campo S. Pedro; Referee: João Pinho

11 October 2020	Cerveira (3)	0–2	(3) Oriental de Lisboa	Vila Nova de Cerveira
15:00		Report	Ruben Gouveia 17'; Hugo Santos 21'	Stadium: Estádio Municipal Rafael Pedreira; Referee: Duarte Oliveira

11 October 2020	Desportivo de Monção (4)	2–0	(4) Barreirense	Monção
15:00	Stivan Gonçalves 17'; Jorge Ramos 45'	Report		Stadium: Campo Manuel Lima; Referee: Pedro Ferreira

11 October 2020	Estudantes Africanos (4)	0–5	(2) Arouca	Bragança
15:00		Report	Anthony Blondell 8', 74'; Brunão 11'; Quaresma 86'; André Silva 90'	Stadium: Parque Desportivo Sta. Apolonia; Referee: João Gonçalves

11 October 2020	GRAP (3)	1–4	(2) Cova da Piedade	Leiria
15:00	Daniel Pinto 90+9'	Report	Edinho 52', 65'; Gonçalo Maria 90+4', 90+8'	Stadium: Campo da Charneca; Referee: João Bento

11 October 2020	Idanhense (4)	0–8	(3) Torreense	Idanha-a-Nova
15:00	Fabio Pimenta 43', 110' (pen.)	Report	Filipe Andrade 9'; Onyekachi Silas 13'; Ricardo António 36', 69'; Inácio Marques 48'; Mamadou Traore 73'; Gustavo Freire 75', 89'	Stadium: Estádio Municipal Idanha-a-Nova; Referee: Renato Gonçalves

11 October 2020	Limianos (4)	2–1 (a.e.t.)	(3) Aljustrelense	Arcos de Valdevez
15:00	Fabio Pimenta 43', 110' (pen.)	Report	Pedro Guerreiro 49'	Stadium: Estádio Municipal da Coutada; Referee: Bruno Costa

11 October 2020	Loures (3)	0–2	(3) Gondomar	Loures
15:00		Report	Ângelo Oliveira 22'; Thierno Niang 45' (pen.)	Stadium: Campo José Silva Faria; Referee: Hélder Carvalho

11 October 2020	Lusitano de Évora (3)	2–1 (a.e.t.)	(3) Mortágua	Vendas Novas
15:00	Mauro Andrade 79'; José Lúcio 112'	Report	Rudolfo Figueiredo 82'	Stadium: Estádio Municipal de Vendas Novas; Referee: Paulo Barradas

11 October 2020	Moncarapachense (3)	1–2	(3) Anadia	Moncarapacho
15:00	João Pereira 35'	Report	Tiago Melo 16'; Tamble Monteiro 90+5'	Stadium: Estádio Dr. António João Eusébio; Referee: Hélder Nunes

11 October 2020	Montalegre (3)	3–1	(3) Vila Cortez	Montalegre
15:00	Anderson Carvalho 79'; Zacharia Ngom 112'; Rúben Neves 75'	Report	Rui Santos 78'	Stadium: Campo Dr. Diogo Alves Vaz Pereira; Referee: Albano Correia

11 October 2020	Moura (3)	0–2	(3) Beira-Mar	Moura
15:00		Report	Marko Mitrovic 6'; Mário Mendonça 25' (pen.)	Stadium: Estádio do Moura Atlético Clube; Referee: André Pereira

11 October 2020	Oleiros (3)	3–2	(3) Mirandela	Oleiros
15:00	Ricardo Almeida 29' (pen.); Elisson Santos 65'; Duvan Santos 82'	Report	Patrick Igwe 52'; João Dias 74'	Stadium: Estadio Municipal de Oleiros; Referee: Gonçalo Carreira

11 October 2020	Pêro Pinheiro (3)	0–1	(3) Fafe	Sintra
15:00		Report	José Oliveira 66'	Stadium: Campo Pardal Monteiro; Referee: João Marques

11 October 2020	São João de Ver (3)	0–0 (a.e.t.)	(3) Marinhense	São João de Ver
15:00		Report	Miguel Vinagre 114'	Stadium: Estádio Sp. Clube São João de Ver; Referee: Fábio Loureiro

11 October 2020	Sanjoanense (3)	0–0 (a.e.t.) (5–4 p)	(3) Canelas 2010	São João da Madeira
15:00		Report		Stadium: Estádio Conde Dias Garcia; Referee: João Santos

11 October 2020	Santa Marta de Penaguião (4)	1–5	(2) Leixões	Santa Marta de Penaguião
15:00	António Paiva 10'	Report	Tiago Rodrigues 33'; Francisco Silva 35'; Jota 44'; Rui Pedro 59'; Joca 63'	Stadium: Estádio Municipal de Santa Marta de Penaguião; Referee: João Casegas

11 October 2020	São Martinho (3)	1–2	(3) Paredes	Santo Tirso
15:00	Emmanuel Dass 56'	Report	Caleb Gomina 32'; Ismael Pinto 71'	Stadium: Campo Comendador Abilio Ferreira Oliveira; Referee: Marco Cruz

11 October 2020	Vianense (3)	0–1	(4) Vilar de Perdizes	Viana do Castelo
15:00		Report	Agustin Guerra 46'	Stadium: Estádio Dr. José de Matos; Referee: André Neto

11 October 2020	Vila Real (3)	2–3	(2) Casa Pia	Vila Real
15:00	Carlos Mendes 21'; Ivanildo Nhaga 74'	Report	Donald Djoussé 65'; Vitó 82'; Derick Poloni 85'	Stadium: Complexo Desportivo Monte da Forca; Referee: Carlos Macedo

11 October 2020	Sesimbra (4)	1–4	(2) Oliveirense	Sesimbra
15:00	Nuno Borges 75'	Report	António Oliveira 17' (pen.); Jorge Teixeira 19', 23'; Leandro Silva 35'	Stadium: Estádio Vila Amália; Referee: Miguel Nogueira

11 October 2020	Espinho (3)	1–0	(2) Chaves	Ovar
15:00	Miguel Pereira 70'	Report		Stadium: Estádio Marques da Silva; Referee: Manuel Mota

11 October 2020	Trofense (3)	4–2	(3) Águeda	Trofa
15:00	Keffel 62'; Adilson Silva 67', 90'; Alan Júnior 69' (pen.)	Report	Elias Souza 17' (pen.); Bernardo Fonseca 64'	Stadium: Estádio do CD Trofense; Referee: Manuel Mota

11 October 2020	Vitória de Sernache (3)	0–2	(3) Fabril Barreiro	Sertã
15:00		Report	Adjeil Neves 74'; Ivan Reis 80'	Stadium: Estádio Nuno Álvares Pereira; Referee: José Almeida

11 October 2020	Sporting Ideal (3)	0–0 (a.e.t.) (3–4 p)	(3) Merelinense	Ribeira Grande
16:00		Report		Stadium: Estadio Municipal da Ribeira Grande; Referee: Eduardo Rocha

11 October 2020	Alverca (3)	2–1	(3) Camacha	Alverca
17:00	Caiser Gomes 45'; Flávio Silva 87'	Report	João Barros 51'	Stadium: Campo do Futebol Clube Alverca; Referee: João Bernardo

21 October 2020	Tirsense (3)	2–3	(3) Olímpico Montijo	Santo Tirso
15:00	João Martins 14', 66'	Report	Diogo Santos 3', 74' (pen.); Patchú Monteiro 59'	Stadium: Estádio Abel Alves de Figueiredo

28 October 2020	Vilaverdense (3)	1–1 (a.e.t.) (5–4 p)	(3) União de Santarém	Vila Verde
14:30	Rafa Miranda 2' (pen.)		João Monteiro 88'	Stadium: Campo Cruz do Reguengo

28 October 2020	Rebordelo (4)	1–3	(2) Varzim	Amarante
15:00	Aroldinho 50'	Report	Clemente 33' (o.g.); Christian Irobiso 77'; Sodiq Fatai 90'	Stadium: Campo de Jogos de Rebordelo; Referee: Rui Lima

28 October 2020	Felgueiras 1932 (3)	2–1	(3) Valadares	Felgueiras
15:00	Clayton 52'; Fonseca 90+4'	Report	Abdoullahi Tanko 74'	Stadium: Estádio Dr. Machado de Matos

28 October 2020	Vitória de Setúbal (3)	0–1	(2) Académico de Viseu	Setúbal
18:00		Report	Paul Ayongo 5'	Stadium: Estádio do Bonfim

11 November 2020	Pedras Rubras (3)	2–3	(3) Salgueiros	Pedras Rubras
15:00	Tiago Silva 70'; Everton 79'	Report	Yannick Semedo 23'; Kevin Serge 30'; Miguel Baptista 52'	Stadium: Estádio Municipal de Pedras Rubras

== Third round ==
A total of 64 teams were involved in the third round draw, which was held on 22 October 2020. The 18 teams from the Primeira Liga joined the 46 winners from second round. All Primeira Liga teams played this round as visitors.

Number of teams per tier entering this round
Primeira Liga (1)	Liga Portugal 2 (2)	Campeonato de Portugal (3)	District Championships (4)	Total
18 / 18	14 / 16	29 / 88	3 / 43	64 / 165

20 November 2020	Oleiros (3)	0–0 (a.e.t.) (2–4 p)	(1) Gil Vicente	Oleiros
14:30		Report		Stadium: Estadio Municipal de Oleiros; Referee: Hugo Silva

20 November 2020	Feirense (2)	0–1	(3) Amora	Santa Maria da Feira
17:30		Report	Joca 24'	Stadium: Estádio Marcolino de Castro; Referee: David Silva

20 November 2020	União de Leiria (3)	1–0	(1) Portimonense	Leiria
21:00				Stadium: Estádio Dr. Magalhães Pessoa; Referee: Tiago Martins

21 November 2020	Oriental Dragon (3)	0–0 (a.e.t.) (3–4 p)	(2) Leixões	Moita
11:00				Stadium: Juncal dos Desportos

21 November 2020	Oriental de Lisboa (3)	0–3	(1) Famalicão	Lisbon
11:15				Stadium: Estádio Engenheiro Carlos Salema

21 November 2020	Montalegre (3)	2–3	(2) Académico de Viseu	Montalegre
14:00				Stadium: Estádio Dr. Diogo Alves Vaz Pereira

21 November 2020	Fabril (3)	0–2	(1) Porto	Barreiro
14:30		Report	Martínez 45+1'; Taremi 51'	Stadium: Complexo Desportivo Alfredo da Silva; Referee: João Bento

21 November 2020	Marinhense (3)	1–1 (a.e.t.) (3–5 p)	(2) Cova da Piedade	Marinha Grande
15:00				Stadium: Estádio Municipal da Marinha Grande

21 November 2020	Arouca (2)	0–0 (a.e.t.) (6–7 p)	(1) Vitória de Guimarães	Arouca
16:30				Stadium: Estádio Municipal de Arouca

21 November 2020	Trofense (3)	1–2	(1) Braga	Trofa
19:30	Alan Júnior 50' (pen.)	Report	Ruiz 44'; Galeno 90+3'	Stadium: Estádio do CD Trofense; Referee: Fabio Melo

21 November 2020	Paredes (3)	0–1	(1) Benfica	Paredes
21:15		Report	Samaris 25'	Stadium: Estádio da Cidade Desportiva de Paredes; Referee: Vitor Ferreira

22 November 2020	Anadia (3)	2–1	(3) Pinhalnovense	Anadia
11:00				Stadium: Estádio Municipal Engº Sílvio Henriques Cerveira

22 November 2020	Fafe (3)	5–1	(4) Vilar de Perdizes	Fafe
11:00				Stadium: Estádio Municipal de Fafe

22 November 2020	Felgueiras 1932 (3)	0–1	(1) Tondela	Felgueiras
11:00				Stadium: Estádio Dr. Machado de Matos

22 November 2020	Limianos (4)	1–2	(3) Fontinhas	Ponte de Lima
11:00				Stadium: Campo do Cruzeiro

22 November 2020	Espinho (3)	2–1	(3) Gondomar	Espinho
11:00				Stadium: Estádio Comendador Manuel Violas

22 November 2020	Torreense (3)	2–0	(3) Alverca	Torres Vedras
11:00				Stadium: Estádio Manuel Marques

22 November 2020	Vilaverdense (3)	2–3	(3) Olímpico Montijo	Vila Verde
11:00				Stadium: Campo Cruz do Reguengo

22 November 2020	Beira-Mar (3)	1–3	(1) Santa Clara	Aveiro
14:30				Stadium: Estádio Municipal de Aveiro

22 November 2020	Monção (4)	1–2	(1) Rio Ave	Monção
14:30				Stadium: Campo Manuel Lima

22 November 2020	Merelinense (3)	0–1	(1) Moreirense	Braga
14:30				Stadium: Estádio João Soares Vieira

22 November 2020	Oliveirense (2)	0–4	(1) Paços de Ferreira	Oliveira de Azeméis
17:15				Stadium: Estádio Carlos Osório

22 November 2020	Vizela (2)	0–1 (a.e.t.)	(1) Boavista	Vizela
20:00				Stadium: Estádio do FC Vizela

23 November 2020	Salgueiros (3)	2–1	(2) Sp. Covilhã	Porto
11:00				Stadium: Complexo Desportivo de Campanhã

23 November 2020	Penafiel (2)	2–3 (a.e.t.)	(1) Marítimo	Penafiel
14:00				Stadium: Estádio Municipal 25 de Abril

23 November 2020	Real (3)	0–2	(1) Belenenses SAD	Queluz
16:45				Stadium: Estádio do Real Sport Clube

23 November 2020	Académica (2)	1–0	(2) Varzim	Coimbra
19:30				Stadium: Estádio Cidade de Coimbra

23 November 2020	Sacavenense (3)	1–7	(1) Sporting CP	Oeiras
21:15	Iaquinta 53'		Santos 3'; Coates 26', 47'; Cabral 32' (pen.); Marques 86', 90'; Inácio 90+2'	Stadium: Estádio Nacional

25 November 2020	Casa Pia (2)	2–3	(1) Nacional	Lisbon
15:00				Stadium: Estádio Pina Manique

3 December 2020	Estrela da Amadora (3)	2–0	(1) Farense	Amadora
14:30				Stadium: Estádio José Gomes

9 December 2020	Estoril (2)	5–0	(3) Lusitano de Évora	Estoril
15:00				Stadium: Estádio António Coimbra da Mota

9 December 2020	Vilafranquense (2)	2–1	(3) Sanjoanense	Vila Franca de Xira
18:00				Stadium: Campo do Cevadeiro

== Fourth round ==
A total of 32 teams were involved in the fourth round draw, which was held on 25 November 2020.

Number of teams per tier entering this round
Primeira Liga (1)	Liga Portugal 2 (2)	Campeonato de Portugal (3)	District Championships (4)	Total
16 / 18	6 / 16	10 / 88	0 / 43	32 / 165

11 December 2020	Académico de Viseu (2)	3–0	(2) Académica	Viseu
14:00				Stadium: Estádio do Fontelo

11 December 2020	Sporting CP (1)	3–0	(1) Paços de Ferreira	Lisbon
21:15	Tomás 26'; Tabata 44'; Palhinha 64'	Report		Stadium: Estádio José Alvalade; Referee: João Pinheiro

12 December 2020	Fontinhas (3)	1–1 (a.e.t.) (3–4 p)	(3) Fafe	Fontinhas
11:00				Stadium: Campo Municipal Dr. Durval Monteiro

12 December 2020	Rio Ave (1)	2–1	(1) Famalicão	Vila do Conde
15:00				Stadium: Estádio dos Arcos

12 December 2020	Estoril (2)	2–1	(1) Boavista	Estoril
21:00				Stadium: Estádio António Coimbra da Mota

13 December 2020	Cova da Piedade (2)	2–3 (a.e.t.)	(1) Moreirense	Cova da Piedade
11:00				Stadium: Estádio Municipal José Martins Vieira

13 December 2020	Vitória de Guimarães (1)	0–1	(1) Santa Clara	Guimarães
15:00				Stadium: Estádio D. Afonso Henriques

13 December 2020	Porto (1)	2–1	(1) Tondela	Porto
18:30	Taremi 4'; Marega 24'	Report	Mendes 20'	Stadium: Estádio do Dragão; Referee: Fabio Verissimo

13 December 2020	Benfica (1)	5–0	(2) Vilafranquense	Lisbon
20:30	Ramos 11'; Pizzi 14'; Seferovic 15', 42'; Pedrinho 56'	Report		Stadium: Estádio da Luz; Referee: Andre Narciso

14 December 2020	Torreense (3)	1–0	(3) Amora	Torres Vedras
11:00				Stadium: Estádio Manuel Marques

14 December 2020	Anadia (3)	0–1	(3) Estrela da Amadora	Anadia
14:00				Stadium: Estádio Engº Sílvio Henriques Cerveira

14 December 2020	Olímpico Montijo (3)	0–7	(1) Braga	Oeiras
20:15		Report	Ruiz 28'; Paulinho 30'; Horta 73'; Novais 77' (pen.); Tormena 86'; Galeno 87'; Medeiros 90'	Stadium: Estádio Nacional; Referee: Gustavo Correia

23 December 2020	Marítimo (1)	2–1	(3) Salgueiros	Funchal
11:00				Stadium: Estádio do Marítimo

23 December 2020	União de Leiria (3)	0–3	(1) Gil Vicente	Leiria
16:00				Stadium: Estádio Dr. Magalhães Pessoa

23 December 2020	Belenenses SAD (1)	3–0 (a.e.t.)	(3) Espinho	Oeiras
19:00				Stadium: Estádio Nacional

23 December 2020	Nacional (1)	3–1	(2) Leixões	Funchal
20:00				Stadium: Estádio da Madeira

== Fifth round ==
A total of 16 teams were involved in the fifth round draw, which was held on 16 December.

Number of teams per tier entering this round
Primeira Liga (1)	Liga Portugal 2 (2)	Campeonato de Portugal (3)	District Championships (4)	Total
11 / 18	2 / 16	3 / 88	0 / 43	16 / 165

11 January 2021	Marítimo (1)	2–0	(1) Sporting CP	Funchal
21:15	Pinho 68'; Andrade 79'	Report		Stadium: Estádio do Marítimo; Referee: Manuel Oliveira

12 January 2021	Rio Ave (1)	1–2	(2) Estoril	Vila do Conde
14:00	Dala 65'	Report	Aziz 14'; Vidigal 31'	Stadium: Estádio dos Arcos; Referee: Artur Soares Dias

12 January 2021	Moreirense (1)	1–2	(1) Santa Clara	Moreira de Cónegos
17:00	Silva 51'	Report	Ukra 36'; Moghanlou 87'	Stadium: Parque de Jogos Comendador Joaquim de Almeida Freitas; Referee: Rui Costa

12 January 2021	Nacional (1)	2–4 (a.e.t.)	(1) Porto	Funchal
18:00	Róchez 25'; Riascos 62'	Report	Díaz 22'; Evanilson 89'; Oliveira 102'; Taremi 115'	Stadium: Estádio da Madeira; Referee: António Nobre

12 January 2021	Estrela da Amadora (3)	0–4	(1) Benfica	Amadora
21:15		Report	Chiquinho 42', 63'; Seferovic 51'; Waldschmidt 66'	Stadium: Estádio José Gomes; Referee: Joao Bento

13 January 2021	Braga (1)	5–0	(3) Torreense	Braga
15:30	Rolando 24'; Ruiz 28', 61'; Esgaio 52'; Oliveira 90+3' (pen.)	Report		Stadium: Estádio Municipal de Braga; Referee: Agostinho Silva

14 January 2021	Fafe (3)	2–3 (a.e.t.)	(1) Belenenses SAD	Fafe
14:00	Nogueira 19'; Neves 45+5' (pen.)	Report	Cardoso 88' (pen.), 90+7' (pen.); Teixeira 120'	Stadium: Estádio Municipal de Fafe; Referee: Iancu Vasilica

14 January 2021	Gil Vicente (1)	3–2 (a.e.t.)	(2) Académico de Viseu	Barcelos
20:30	Abbas 28'; Talocha 80'; Lino 96'	Report	Mesquita 14'; Paná 76'	Stadium: Estádio Cidade de Barcelos; Referee: Tiago Martins

== Quarter-finals ==
The quarter-final pairings were decided during the draw of the fifth round, on 16 December 2020.

Number of teams per tier entering this round
Primeira Liga (1)	Liga Portugal 2 (2)	Campeonato de Portugal (3)	District Championships (4)	Total
7 / 18	1 / 16	0 / 88	0 / 43	8 / 165

27 January 2021	Marítimo (1)	1–3 (a.e.t.)	(2) Estoril	Funchal
20:15	Joel 30'	Report	Gamboa 90+10' (pen.); Lazare 97'; Harramiz 109'	Stadium: Estádio do Marítimo; Referee: Hélder Malheiro

28 January 2021	Benfica (1)	3–0	(1) Belenenses SAD	Lisbon
21:15	Núñez 32'; Silva 37'; Cervi 72'	Report		Stadium: Estádio da Luz; Referee: João Pinheiro

29 January 2021	Braga (1)	2–1	(1) Santa Clara	Braga
19:45	Horta 25'; Ruiz 43'	Report	Crysan 90+6'	Stadium: Estádio Municipal de Braga; Referee: Nuno Almeida

29 January 2021	Gil Vicente (1)	0–2	(1) Porto	Barcelos
20:45		Report	Corona 10'; Taremi 88'	Stadium: Estádio Cidade de Barcelos; Referee: Rui Costa

== Semi-finals ==
Number of teams per tier entering this round
Primeira Liga (1)	Liga Portugal 2 (2)	Campeonato de Portugal (3)	District Championships (4)	Total
3 / 18	1 / 16	0 / 88	0 / 43	4 / 165

Times are WET (UTC±0).

10 February 2021
20:15

Braga (1)	1–1	(1) Porto
Fransérgio 90+12'	Report	Taremi 9'

Estádio Municipal de Braga, Braga
Attendance: 0
Referee: Luís Godinho
3 March 2021
21:00

Porto (1)	2–3	(1) Braga
Otávio 30'; Marega 75'	Report	Ruiz 9', 14'; Piazon 28'

Estádio do Dragão, Porto
Attendance: 0
Referee: Artur Soares Dias

Braga won 4–3 on aggregate.

11 February 2021
20:15

Estoril (2)	1–3	(1) Benfica
Vidigal 24'	Report	Núñez 45', 78'; Seferovic 69'

Estádio António Coimbra da Mota, Estoril
Attendance: 0
Referee: António Nobre
4 March 2021
21:00

Benfica (1)	2–0	(2) Estoril
Ramos 43'; Waldschmidt 90'	Report

Estádio da Luz, Lisbon
Attendance: 0
Referee: Hélder Malheiro

Benfica won 5–1 on aggregate.

== Final ==
23 May 2021
20:30 WEST

Braga	2–0	Benfica
Piazon 45+3'; R. Horta 85'	Report

Estádio Cidade de Coimbra, Coimbra
Attendance: 0 (Note: The final was played behind closed doors due to the COVID-19 pandemic in Portugal.)
Referee: Nuno Almeida

== Bracket ==
Fifth round
13 January 2021
Braga	5
Torreense	0
12 January 2021
Moreirense	1
Santa Clara	2
14 January 2021
Gil Vicente (a.e.t.)	3
Académico de Viseu	2
12 January 2021
Nacional	2
Porto (a.e.t.)	4
11 January 2021
Marítimo	2
Sporting CP	0
12 January 2021
Rio Ave	1
Estoril	2
12 January 2021
Estrela da Amadora	0
Benfica	4
14 January 2021
Fafe	2
Belenenses SAD (a.e.t.)	3

Quarter-finals
29 January 2021
Braga	2
Santa Clara	1
29 January 2021
Gil Vicente	0
Porto	2
27 January 2021
Marítimo	1
Estoril (a.e.t.)	3
28 January 2021
Benfica	3
Belenenses SAD	0

Semi-finals
10 February/3 March 2021
Braga	1	3	4
Porto	1	2	3
11 February/4 March 2021
Estoril	1	0	1
Benfica	3	2	5

Final
23 May 2021
Braga	2
Benfica	0
