= 2020–21 S.C. Braga season =

Braga
2020–21 season
- President: António Salvador
- Head coach: Carlos Carvalhal
- Stadium: Estádio Municipal de Braga
- Primeira Liga: 4th
- Taça de Portugal: Winners
- Taça da Liga: Runners-up
- UEFA Europa League: Round of 32
- Top goalscorer: League: Ricardo Horta (9); All: Ricardo Horta (15)
Home colours	Away colours	Third colours

The 2020–21 season was S.C. Braga's 100th season in existence and the club's 25th consecutive season in the top flight of Portuguese football. In addition to the domestic league, S.C. Braga participated in this season's editions of the Taça de Portugal, the Taça da Liga and the UEFA Europa League. The season covered the period from 26 July 2020 to 30 June 2021.

On 23 May 2021, Braga defeated Benfica in the 2021 Taça de Portugal Final to claim their third win in the competition in club history.

== Players ==
=== First-team squad ===
As of 12 February 2021.

Note: Flags indicate national team as defined under FIFA eligibility rules; some limited exceptions apply. Players may hold more than one non-FIFA nationality.

No.	Pos.	Nation	Player
1	GK	BRA	Matheus
2	DF	POR	Zé Carlos
3	DF	BRA	Vítor Tormena
5	DF	POR	Nuno Sequeira
6	DF	POR	Rolando
7	MF	POR	João Novais
8	MF	LBA	Ali Elmusrati
9	FW	ESP	Abel Ruiz
10	MF	ARG	Nicolás Gaitán
11	FW	BRA	Lucas Piazon
12	GK	POR	Tiago Sá
15	MF	POR	André Horta
16	DF	POR	David Carmo

No.	Pos.	Nation	Player
18	FW	POR	Rui Fonte
19	FW	SLO	Andraž Šporar (on loan from Sporting CP)
21	FW	POR	Ricardo Horta
22	DF	BRA	Caju
26	DF	COL	Cristian Borja
27	MF	BRA	Fransérgio (captain)
34	DF	BRA	Raul Silva
45	MF	POR	Iuri Medeiros (on loan from Nürnberg)
47	DF	POR	Ricardo Esgaio
74	DF	POR	Francisco Moura
88	MF	POR	André Castro
90	FW	BRA	Galeno
91	GK	CZE	Lukáš Horníček

=== Others players under contract ===
Note: Flags indicate national team as defined under FIFA eligibility rules; some limited exceptions apply. Players may hold more than one non-FIFA nationality.

No.	Pos.	Nation	Player
—	DF	CRO	Andrej Lukić
—	MF	BRA	Eduardo

No.	Pos.	Nation	Player
—	FW	BRA	Crislan

=== Out on loan ===
Note: Flags indicate national team as defined under FIFA eligibility rules; some limited exceptions apply. Players may hold more than one non-FIFA nationality.

No.	Pos.	Nation	Player
—	DF	BRA	Bruno Viana (at Flamengo until 31 December 2021)
—	DF	POR	Bruno Wilson (at Tenerife until 30 June 2021)
—	MF	POR	Fábio Martins (at Al-Shabab until 30 June 2021)

No.	Pos.	Nation	Player
—	MF	BRA	Ricardo Ryller (at Red Bull Bragantino until 30 June 2021)
—	FW	BRA	Murilo (at Mallorca until 30 June 2021)
—	FW	POR	Leandro Sanca (at Académica until 30 June 2021)

== Transfers ==
=== In ===
No.	Pos	Player	Transferred from	Fee	Date	Source
45	MF	(Portugal) Iuri Medeiros	(Germany) Nürnberg	Loan	28 July 2021	
8	FW	(Spain) Abel Ruiz	(Spain) Barcelona	€8 million	31 July 2021	
8	MF	(Libya) Ali Elmusrati	(Portugal) Vitória de Guimarães	Undisclosed	31 July 2021	
10	MF	(Argentina) Nicolás Gaitán	(France) Lille	Free	11 August 2020	
11	MF	(Brazil) Lucas Piazon	(England) Chelsea	Undisclosed	14 January 2021	
26	DF	(Colombia) Cristian Borja	(Portugal) Sporting	Undisclosed	1 February 2021	
19	FW	(Slovenia) Andraž Šporar	(Portugal) Sporting	Loan	1 February 2021	

=== Out ===
No.	Pos	Player	Transferred to	Fee	Date	Source
–	DF	(Brazil) Pablo	(Turkey) Hatayspor	Loan	19 August 2020	
4	DF	(Portugal) Bruno Wilson	(Spain) Tenerife	Loan	30 August 2020	
11	FW	(Brazil) Murilo	(Spain) Mallorca	Loan	17 September 2020	
–	MF	(Portugal) Fábio Martins	(Saudi Arabia) Al-Shabab	Loan	25 September 2020	
20	FW	(Portugal) Paulinho	(Portugal) Sporting CP	€16 million	1 February 2021	

== Pre-season and friendlies ==
Win Draw Loss Fixtures

2 September 2020 Friendly	Benfica	2–1	Braga	Lisbon, Portugal
19:00 WEST (UTC+1)	Taarabt (yellow card) 41' (yellow-red card) 69'; Vinícius 56', 90+3'	Report	Paulinho 30'; A. Horta (yellow card) 45+1'	Stadium: Estádio da Luz; Attendance: 0

5 September 2020 Friendly	Braga	Cancelled	Santa Clara	Fão, Portugal
19:00 WEST (UTC+1)				Stadium: Sports Complex Football Club Fão; Attendance: 0

5 September 2020 Friendly	Braga	2–2	Valladolid	Braga, Portugal
19:00 WEST (UTC+1)				Stadium: Estádio Municipal de Braga

== Competitions ==
=== Overview ===
Competition	First match	Last match	Starting round	Final position	Record							
Competition	First match	Last match	Starting round	Final position	Pld	W	D	L	GF	GA	GD	Win %
Primeira Liga	19 September 2020	19 May 2021	Matchday 1	4th	34	19	7	8	53	33	+20	55.88
Taça de Portugal	21 November 2020	23 May 2021	Third round	Winners	7	6	1	0	22	5	+17	85.71
Taça da Liga	17 December 2020	23 January 2021	Quarter-finals	Runners-up	3	2	0	1	5	3	+2	66.67
Europa League	22 October 2020	25 February 2021	Group stage	Round of 32	8	4	1	3	15	15	+0	50.00
Total					52	31	9	12	95	56	+39	59.62

Last updated: 23 May 2021
Source: Soccerway

=== Primeira Liga ===
==== League table ====
Pos	Team	Pld	W	D	L	GF	GA	GD	Pts	Qualification or relegation
2	Porto	34	24	8	2	74	29	+45	80	Qualification for the Champions League group stage
3	Benfica	34	23	7	4	69	27	+42	76	Qualification for the Champions League third qualifying round
4	Braga	34	19	7	8	53	33	+20	64	Qualification for the Europa League group stage (Note: Braga qualified for the Europa League group stage by winning the 2020–21 Taça de Portugal. Since they would have qualified for the Europa Conference League third qualifying round by finishing fourth, the berth was awarded to the fifth-placed team (Paços de Ferreira), and the Europa Conference League second qualifying round berth reserved to the fifth-placed team was awarded to the sixth-placed team (Santa Clara).)
5	Paços de Ferreira	34	15	8	11	40	41	−1	53	Qualification for the Europa Conference League third qualifying round
6	Santa Clara	34	13	7	14	44	36	+8	46	Qualification for the Europa Conference League second qualifying round

Source: Liga Portugal
Rules for classification: 1) Points; 2) Head-to-head points; 3) Head-to-head goal difference; 4) Head-to-head away goals scored; 5) Goal difference; 6) Matches won; 7) Goals scored; 8) Play-off.

==== Results summary ====
Overall								Home						Away					
Pld	W	D	L	GF	GA	GD	Pts	W	D	L	GF	GA	GD	W	D	L	GF	GA	GD
34	19	7	8	53	33	+20	64	11	3	3	27	15	+12	8	4	5	26	18	+8

Last updated: 19 May 2021.
Source: Liga Portugal

==== Results by round ====
Round	1	2	3	4	5	6	7	8	9	10	11	12	13	14	15	16	17	18	19	20	21	22	23	24	25	26	27	28	29	30	31	32	33	34
Ground	A	H	A	H	A	H	A	H	A	H	A	A	H	A	H	A	H	H	A	H	A	H	A	H	A	H	A	H	H	A	H	A	H	A
Result	L	L	W	W	W	W	W	W	L	W	W	L	W	L	W	W	W	D	W	W	W	W	D	L	W	D	D	W	L	L	D	D	W	D
Position	17	17	12	6	4	3	2	3	4	4	4	4	4	4	4	4	3	3	3	3	2	2	3	4	4	4	4	4	4	4	4	4	4	4

Updated to match(es) played on 19 May 2021. Source: Liga Portugal
A = Away; H = Home; W = Win; D = Draw; L = Loss

==== Matches ====
The league fixtures were announced on 28 August 2020.

19 September 2020 1	Porto	3–1	Braga	Porto
21:00 WEST (UTC+1)	Oliveira 45+1'; Telles 45+3' (pen.), 89' (pen.)	Report	Castro 21'	Stadium: Estádio do Dragão; Attendance: 0 (Note: The match was played behind closed doors due to the COVID-19 pandemic in Portugal.); Referee: João Pinheiro

25 September 2020 2	Braga	0–1	Santa Clara	Braga
20:30 WEST (UTC+1)		Report	Thiago Santana 5'	Stadium: Estádio Municipal de Braga; Attendance: 0 Referee: Rui Costa

3 October 2020 3	Tondela	0–4	Braga	Tondela
21:00 WEST (UTC+1)		Report	Viana 22'; Galeno 26', 43'; R. Horta 29'	Stadium: Estádio João Cardoso; Attendance: 0 Referee: Nuno Almeida

17 October 2020 4	Braga	2–1	Nacional	Braga
18:00 WEST (UTC+1)	Fransérgio 28'; Medeiros 42'	Report	Borges 86'	Stadium: Estádio Municipal de Braga; Attendance: 0 Referee: Artur Soares Dias

25 October 2020 5	Vitória de Guimarães	0–1	Braga	Guimarães
20:00 WET (UTC±0)		Report	Esgaio 27'	Stadium: Estádio D. Afonso Henriques; Attendance: 0 Referee: Fábio Veríssimo

2 November 2020 6	Braga	1–0	Famalicão	Braga
18:45 WET (UTC±0)	Viana 74'	Report		Stadium: Estádio Municipal de Braga; Attendance: 0 Referee: Rui Costa

8 November 2020 7	Benfica	2–3	Braga	Lisbon
20:00 WET (UTC±0)	Seferovic 68', 86'; Gonçalves (yellow card) 79'	Report	Medeiros (yellow card) 11', (goal) 38'; Esgaio (yellow card) 26'; Moura 50', 63'; Sequeira (yellow card) 56'	Stadium: Estádio da Luz; Attendance: 0 Referee: Artur Soares Dias

29 November 2020 8	Braga	1–0	Farense	Braga
20:00 WET (UTC±0)	Carmo (yellow card) 3'; Fransérgio (yellow card) 57'; Novais (yellow card) 79'; Elmusrati 87'	Report	Oudrhiri (yellow card) 47'; Falcão (yellow card) 80'; Gauld (yellow card) 90+2'	Stadium: Estádio Municipal de Braga; Attendance: 0 Referee: António Nobre

6 December 2020 9	Belenenses SAD	2–1	Braga	Oeiras
20:00 WET (UTC±0)	Cardoso 33'; Sousa 45+1'; Teixeira (yellow card) 79'; Phete (yellow card) 90+3'	Report	Carmo (red card) 62'; Paulinho 70' (pen.); Fransérgio (yellow card) 90+5'	Stadium: Estádio Nacional; Attendance: 0 Referee: Hélder Malheiro

22 December 2020 10	Braga	3–0	Rio Ave	Braga
20:15 WET (UTC±0)	R. Horta 43'; Tormena (yellow card) 60'; Fransérgio 62'; Paulinho 88'	Report		Stadium: Estádio Municipal de Braga; Attendance: 0 Referee: João Pinheiro

28 December 2020 11	Boavista	1–4	Braga	Porto
21:00 WET (UTC±0)	Castro 66'; Benguché (yellow card) 81'	Report	Paulinho 4'; Medeiros 15'; R. Horta 26', 70'; Elmusrati (yellow card) 67'	Stadium: Estádio do Bessa; Attendance: 0 Referee: André Narciso

2 January 2021 12	Sporting CP	2–0	Braga	Lisbon
18:00 WET (UTC±0)	Gonçalves 54'; Nunes 78', (yellow card) 90+1'; Porro (yellow card) 79'; Antunes (yellow card) 90+2'	Report	Galeno (yellow card) 37'; Silva (yellow card) 51'; Elmusrati (yellow card) 58'; Matheus (yellow card) 88'	Stadium: Estádio José Alvalade; Attendance: 0 Referee: Fábio Veríssimo

7 January 2021 13	Braga	2–1	Marítimo	Braga
21:00 WET (UTC±0)	R. Horta (yellow card) 29', (goal) 67'; Medeiros 34'; Fransérgio (yellow card) 52'; Elmusrati (yellow card) 70'	Report	Renê (yellow card) 16'; Andrade (yellow card) 50'; Milson 77'; Zainadine (yellow card) 79'; Jean (yellow card) 88'	Stadium: Estádio Municipal de Braga; Attendance: 0 Referee: Hélder Malheiro

16 January 2021 14	Paços de Ferreira	2–0	Braga	Paços de Ferreira
15:30 WET (UTC±0)	Costa 57'; Ferreira 76'; Diaby (yellow card) 90'	Report	Galeno (yellow card) 62'; Medeiros (yellow card) 85'	Stadium: Estádio da Mata Real; Attendance: 0 Referee: Nuno Almeida

26 January 2021 15	Braga	1–0	Gil Vicente	Braga
19:45 WET (UTC±0)	Paulinho (penalty missed) 33'; Viana (yellow card) 44'; Medeiros 72'; Novais (yellow card) 77'; Sequeira (yellow card) 87'; Galeno (yellow card) 90+1'; Fransérgio (yellow card) 90+3'	Report	Pereira (yellow card) 60'	Stadium: Estádio Municipal de Braga; Attendance: 0 Referee: Manuel Oliveira

1 February 2021 16	Moreirense	0–4	Braga	Moreira de Cónegos
19:45 WET (UTC±0)	Yan (yellow card) 86'; Vitória (yellow card) 89'	Report	Fransérgio 6', (yellow card) 41'; Castro 17'; Silva 22'; A. Horta 87'	Stadium: Parque Joaquim de Almeida Freitas; Attendance: 0 Referee: João Pinheiro

4 February 2021 17	Braga	2–1	Portimonense	Braga
21:00 WET (UTC±0)	Piazon 62'; R. Horta 73' (pen.)	Report	Boa Morte 23'; Ewerton (yellow card) 60'; Henrique (yellow card) 90+2'	Stadium: Estádio Municipal de Braga; Attendance: 0 Referee: Rui Costa

7 February 2021 18	Braga	2–2	Porto	Braga
20:45 WET (UTC±0)	Galeno (yellow card) 20'; Tormena (yellow card) 34'; Carmo (yellow card) 59'; Fransérgio 87'; Gaitán 90+4'	Report	Corona (yellow card) 5' (yellow-red card) 60'; Uribe (yellow card) 18'; Oliveira 36' (pen.); Taremi 54'	Stadium: Estádio Municipal de Braga; Attendance: 0 Referee: Artur Soares Dias

14 February 2021 19	Santa Clara	0–1	Braga	Ponta Delgada
17:30 WET (UTC±0)	Carlos (yellow card) 75'; Villanueva (yellow card) 83'; Patric (yellow card) 90+1'	Report	Borja 11'; Silva (yellow card) 62'; Sequeira (yellow card) 90+2'	Stadium: Estádio de São Miguel; Attendance: 0 Referee: João Pinheiro

21 February 2021 20	Braga	4–2	Tondela	Braga
18:00 WET (UTC±0)	Piazon 18', 50'; R. Horta 39'; Novais 42'	Report	Martínez (yellow card) 22'; Arcanjo (yellow card) 72'; Anne 84'; Jaquité 90+3'	Stadium: Estádio Municipal de Braga; Attendance: 0 Referee: Tiago Martins

28 February 2021 21	Nacional	1–2	Braga	Funchal
20:00 WET (UTC±0)	Pedrão (yellow card) 59'; Riascos 69'	Report	Fransérgio 25'; Ruiz 29'	Stadium: Estádio da Madeira; Attendance: 0 Referee: Hélder Malheiro

9 March 2021 22	Braga	3–0	Vitória de Guimarães	Braga
21:45 WET (UTC±0)	Piazon 5', (yellow card) 42'; Ruiz 40'; Šporar 85'	Report	Ouattara (yellow card) 2'; André (yellow card) 59'	Stadium: Estádio Municipal de Braga; Attendance: 0 Referee: Hugo Miguel

15 March 2021 23	Famalicão	2–2	Braga	Vila Nova de Famalicão
20:15 WET (UTC±0)	Anderson 18'; Figueiras (yellow card) 68'; Assunção (yellow card) 70'; Tavares 87'; Dias (yellow card) 90+3'	Report	Esgaio (yellow card) 17'; R. Horta 36' (pen.); Elmusrati 39'; Rodrigues (yellow card) 85'	Stadium: Estádio Municipal 22 de Junho; Attendance: 0 Referee: Manuel Oliveira

21 March 2021 24	Braga	0–2	Benfica	Braga
20:00 WET (UTC±0)	Fransérgio (yellow card) 27' (yellow-red card) 39'	Report	Otamendi (yellow card) 16'; Gonçalves (yellow card) 45+1'; Silva 45+2'; Seferovic 56'; Pizzi (yellow card) 65'; Weigl (yellow card) 70'	Stadium: Estádio Municipal de Braga; Attendance: 0 Referee: João Pinheiro

5 April 2021 25	Farense	1–2	Braga	Faro
18:45 WEST (UTC+1)	Pedro Henrique 34'	Report	Elmusrati 29'; Borja (yellow card) 49'; Šporar 90+1'	Stadium: Estádio de São Luís; Attendance: 0 Referee: Rui Costa

11 April 2021 26	Braga	1–1	Belenenses SAD	Braga
17:30 WEST (UTC+1)	R. Silva (yellow card) 17'; Gaitán 36'; Esgaio (yellow card) 42'; Šporar (yellow card) 53'; Elmusrati (yellow card) 68'	Report	Sousa (yellow card) 30'; Sithole (yellow card) 44'; Cassierra 59'; G. Silva (yellow card) 83'	Stadium: Estádio Municipal de Braga; Attendance: 0 Referee: Artur Soares Dias

17 April 2021 27	Rio Ave	0–0	Braga	Vila do Conde
20:30 WEST (UTC+1)	Filipe Augusto (yellow card) 35'; Amaral (yellow card) 41'; Santos (yellow card) 61'; Gelson (red card) 80'	Report	Sequeira (yellow card) 30'; Zé Carlos (yellow card) 69'	Stadium: Estádio dos Arcos; Attendance: 0 Referee: Nuno Almeida

21 April 2021 28	Braga	2–1	Boavista	Braga
19:00 WEST (UTC+1)	Fransérgio 39'; Šporar 82'	Report	Pérez 28', (yellow card) 41'; Porozo (yellow card) 46' (yellow-red card) 54'; Jardim (yellow card) 47'; Elis (yellow card) 63'	Stadium: Estádio Municipal de Braga; Attendance: 0 Referee: Luís Godinho

25 April 2021 29	Braga	0–1	Sporting CP	Braga
20:00 WEST (UTC+1)	Fransérgio (yellow card) 17'; Gaitán (yellow card) 64'; A. Horta (yellow card) 78'; Esgaio (yellow card) 90+4'	Report	Inácio (yellow card) 10' (yellow-red card) 18'; Tomás (yellow card) 76'; Nunes 81'; Gonçalves (yellow card) 90+4'; Adán (yellow card) 90+6'	Stadium: Estádio Municipal de Braga; Attendance: 0 Referee: Artur Soares Dias

29 April 2021 30	Marítimo	1–0	Braga	Funchal
20:30 WEST (UTC+1)	Andrade (yellow card) 24'; China (yellow card) 42'; Winck (yellow card) 70'; Joel 76'; Guitane (yellow card) 78'; Correa (yellow card) 90+6'	Report	Elmusrati (yellow card) 63'; R. Horta (yellow card) 90+4'	Stadium: Estádio do Marítimo; Attendance: 0 Referee: Fábio Veríssimo

5 May 2021 31	Braga	1–1	Paços de Ferreira	Braga
19:00 WEST (UTC+1)	Galeno 78' (pen.); Ruiz (yellow card) 90+2'	Report	João Pedro 26', (yellow card) 39'; Amaral (yellow card) 33'; Silva (yellow card) 74'	Stadium: Estádio Municipal de Braga; Attendance: 0 Referee: Hélder Malheiro

9 May 2021 32	Gil Vicente	1–1	Braga	Barcelos
20:00 WEST (UTC+1)	Gonçalves 29'; Paulinho (yellow card) 62'	Report	R. Horta 9'; Sequeira (yellow card) 78'; Rodrigues (yellow card) 88'	Stadium: Estádio Cidade de Barcelos; Attendance: 0 Referee: André Narciso

14 May 2021 33	Braga	2–1	Moreirense	Braga
21:15 WEST (UTC+1)	Fransérgio (yellow card) 36'; Ruiz 41'; Musrati (yellow card) 58'; Novais 90+5' (pen.)	Report	Ferraresi (yellow card) 30'; Franco (yellow card) 32'; Pires (yellow card) 79'; Martins 87'; Simão (yellow card) 90+2'	Stadium: Estádio Municipal de Braga; Attendance: 0 Referee: João Bento

19 May 2021 34	Portimonense	0–0	Braga	Portimão
20:00 WEST (UTC+1)	Beto (yellow card) 14'; Lucas (yellow card) 35'; Boa Morte (yellow card) 41'; Rocha (yellow card) 90+2'	Report		Stadium: Estádio Municipal de Portimão; Attendance: 0 Referee: Luís Godinho

=== Taça de Portugal ===
21 November 2020 Third round	Trofense	1–2	Braga	Trofa
19:30 WET (UTC±0)	Leão (yellow card) 25' (yellow-red card) 65'; Yair Castro (yellow card) 29'; Alan Júnior 50' (pen.); Serginho (yellow card) 70'	Report	Castro (yellow card) 18'; Ruiz 44'; A. Horta (yellow card) 62'; Galeno 90+3'	Stadium: Estádio do CD Trofense; Attendance: 0 Referee: Fabio Melo

14 December 2020 Fourth round	Olímpico Montijo	0–7	Braga	Montijo
20:15 WET (UTC±0)	Antunes (yellow card) 61'	Report	Ruiz 28', (yellow card) 61'; Paulinho 30'; Novais (yellow card) 71', (goal) 77' (pen.); R. Horta 73'; Tormena 86'; Galeno 87'; Medeiros 90'	Stadium: Campo da Liberdade; Attendance: 0 Referee: Gustavo Correia

13 January 2021 Fifth round	Braga	5–0	Torreense	Braga
15:30 WET (UTC±0)	Rolando 24'; Ruiz 28', 61'; Esgaio 52'; Fransérgio (yellow card) 90+1'; Oliveira 90+3' (pen.)	Report		Stadium: Estádio Municipal de Braga; Attendance: 0 Referee: Agostinho Silva

29 January 2021 Quarter-finals	Braga	2–1	Santa Clara	Braga
19:45 WET (UTC±0)	R. Horta 25', (yellow card) 40'; Ruiz 43'	Report	Villanueva (yellow card) 90'; Crysan 90+6'	Stadium: Estádio Municipal de Braga; Attendance: 0 Referee: Nuno Almeida

10 February 2021 Semi-finals; First leg	Braga	1–1	Porto	Braga
20:15 WET (UTC±0)	Sequeira (yellow card) 46'; Carmo (yellow card) 62'; Elmusrati (yellow card) 79'; A. Horta (yellow card) 90+10'; Esgaio (yellow card) 90+10'; Fransérgio 90+12'	Report	Taremi 9'; Sarr (yellow card) 25'; Díaz (red card) 70'; Costa (yellow card) 90+7'; Uribe (red card) 90+7'; Evanilson (yellow card) 90+11'	Stadium: Estádio Municipal de Braga; Attendance: 0 Referee: Luís Godinho

3 March 2021 Semi-finals; Second leg	Porto	2–3 (3–4 agg.)	Braga	Porto
20:15 WET (UTC±0)	Otávio 30', (yellow card) 84'; Marega 75'	Report	Ruiz 9', 14'; Piazon 28', (yellow card) 77'; Borja (red card) 34'; Esgaio (yellow card) 43'; Matheus (yellow card) 80'	Stadium: Estádio do Dragão; Attendance: 0 Referee: Artur Soares Dias

23 May 2021 Final	Braga	2–0	Benfica	Coimbra
20:30 WEST (UTC+1)	Esgaio (yellow card) 35'; Piazon 45+3', (red card) 90+4'; Musrati (yellow card) 67'; Novais (yellow card) 82'; R. Horta 85'	Report	Leite (red card) 17'; Silva (yellow card) 85'; Tavares (yellow card) 88'; Otamendi (yellow card) 89'; Taarabt (red card) 90+3'; Grimaldo (yellow card) 90+4'	Stadium: Estádio Cidade de Coimbra; Attendance: 0 Referee: Nuno Almeida

=== Taça da Liga ===
17 December 2020 Quarter-finals	Braga	3–1	Estoril	Braga
20:15 WET (UTC±0)	Paulinho 14', 59', 78'; Viana (yellow card) 22'; Galeno (yellow card) 90+3'	Report	Franco 64'	Stadium: Estádio Municipal de Braga; Attendance: 0 Referee: Luís Godinho

20 January 2021 Semi-finals	Braga	2–1	Benfica	Leiria
19:45 WET (UTC±0)	Castro (yellow card) 20'; Ruiz 28'; Sequeira (yellow card) 34'; Tormena 59'; Esgaio (yellow card) 66'; Fransérgio (yellow card) 90+4'	Report	Todibo (yellow card) 38'; Pizzi 45' (pen.); Weigl (yellow card) 52'; Jardel (yellow card) 83'	Stadium: Estádio Dr. Magalhães Pessoa; Attendance: 0 Referee: Fábio Veríssimo

23 January 2021 Final	Sporting CP	1–0	Braga	Leiria
19:45 WET (UTC±0)	Cabral (yellow card) 24'; Porro 41', (yellow card) 81'; Mendes (yellow card) 76'; Nunes (yellow card) 87'; Gonçalves (yellow card) 90+5', (red card) 90+6'; Neto (yellow card) 90+6'	Report	Sequeira (yellow card) 32'; Elmusrati (yellow card) 90+4'	Stadium: Estádio Dr. Magalhães Pessoa; Attendance: 0 Referee: Tiago Martins

=== UEFA Europa League ===
==== Group stage ====
The group stage draw was held on 2 October 2020.

Pos	Team	Pld	W	D	L	GF	GA	GD	Pts	Qualification	LEI	BRA	ZOR	AEK
1	(England) Leicester City	6	4	1	1	14	5	+9	13 (Note: Head-to-head points: Leicester City 4, Braga 1.)	Advance to knockout phase	—	4–0	3–0	2–0
2	(Portugal) Braga	6	4	1	1	14	10	+4	13	Advance to knockout phase	3–3	—	2–0	3–0
3	(Ukraine) Zorya Luhansk	6	2	0	4	6	11	−5	6		1–0	1–2	—	1–4
4	(Greece) AEK Athens	6	1	0	5	7	15	−8	3		1–2	2–4	0–3	—

Source: UEFA
Rules for classification: Group stage tiebreakers
Notes:

22 October 2020 1	Braga (Portugal)	3–0	(Greece) AEK Athens	Braga, Portugal
21:00 CEST (UTC+2)	Galeno 44'; Sequeira (yellow card) 55'; Carmo (yellow card) 56'; Esgaio (yellow card) 69'; Paulinho 78'; R. Horta 88'	Report	Mantalos (yellow card) 19'; Nedelcearu (yellow card) 34'; Oliveira (yellow card) 67'	Stadium: Estádio Municipal; Attendance: 2,196; Referee: Ruddy Buquet (France)

29 October 2020 2	Zorya Luhansk (Ukraine)	1–2	(Portugal) Braga	Zaporizhia, Ukraine
18:55 CET (UTC+1)	Kocherhin (yellow card) 35'; Kabayev (yellow card) 47'; Ivanisenya 90+6'	Report	Paulinho 4'; Gaitán 11'; Carmo (yellow card) 29'; Fransérgio (yellow card) 78'; Raul Silva (yellow card) 85'	Stadium: Slavutych-Arena; Attendance: 853; Referee: Giorgi Kruashvili (Georgia)

5 November 2020 3	Leicester City (England)	4–0	(Portugal) Braga	Leicester, England
21:00 GMT (UTC±0)	Iheanacho 21', 48', (yellow card) 69'; Albrighton (yellow card) 43'; Praet 67'; Maddison 78'	Report	Esgaio (yellow card) 45+2'; Carmo (yellow card) 90+1'	Stadium: King Power Stadium; Attendance: 0 Referee: Bas Nijhuis (Netherlands)

26 November 2020 4	Braga (Portugal)	3–3	(England) Leicester City	Braga, Portugal
18:55 CET (UTC+1)	Elmusrati 4', (yellow card) 65'; Paulinho 24', (yellow card) 84'; Fransérgio 90+1'; Schettine (yellow card) 90+2'	Report	Barnes 9'; Albrighton (yellow card) 52'; Evans (yellow card) 53'; Thomas 79'; Vardy 90+5'	Stadium: Estádio Municipal; Attendance: 0 Referee: Daniele Orsato (Italy)

3 December 2020 5	AEK Athens (Greece)	2–4	(Portugal) Braga	Athens, Greece
18:55 CET (UTC+1)	Oliveira 31'; Vasilantonopoulos (yellow card) 58', (goal) 89'; Insúa (yellow card) 70'; Mantalos (yellow card) 74'	Report	Tormena 8'; Esgaio 10', (yellow card) 74'; Viana (yellow card) 30'; R. Horta 45'; Elmusrati (yellow card) 50'; Castro (yellow card) 74'; Galeno 83'	Stadium: Olympic Stadium; Attendance: 0 Referee: Georgi Kabakov (Bulgaria)

10 December 2020 6	Braga (Portugal)	2–0	(Ukraine) Zorya Luhansk	Braga, Portugal
21:00 CET (UTC+1)	Abu Hanna 61' (o.g.); R. Horta 68'	Report		Stadium: Estádio Municipal; Attendance: 0 Referee: Daniel Stefański (Poland)

==== Knockout phase ====
===== Round of 32 =====
The draw for the round of 32 was held on 14 December 2020.

18 February 2021 First leg	Braga (Portugal)	0–2	(Italy) Roma	Braga, Portugal
17:55 WET (UTC±0)	Esgaio (yellow card) 32' (yellow-red card) 54'; Silva (yellow card) 89'	Report	Džeko 5'; Mayoral 86'; Mancini (yellow card) 90+6'	Stadium: Estádio Municipal; Attendance: 0 Referee: István Kovács (Romania)

25 February 2021 Second leg	Roma (Italy)	3–1 (5–1 agg.)	(Portugal) Braga	Rome, Italy
21:00 CET (UTC+1)	Džeko 24'; Veretout (yellow card) 57'; Pellegrini (penalty missed) 72'; Pérez 75'; Mayoral 90+1'	Report	Cristante 88' (o.g.)	Stadium: Stadio Olimpico; Attendance: 0 Referee: Andreas Ekberg (Sweden)

== Statistics ==
=== Appearances and goals ===
No.	Pos	Nat	Player	Total		Primeira Liga		Taça de Portugal		Taça da Liga		UEFA Europa League	
No.	Pos	Nat	Player	Apps	Goals	Apps	Goals	Apps	Goals	Apps	Goals	Apps	Goals
Goalkeepers
1	GK	(Brazil) BRA	Matheus	30	0	19	0	2	0	3	0	6	0
12	GK	(Portugal) POR	Tiago Sá	6	0	1	0	3	0	0	0	2	0
91	GK	(Czech Republic) CZE	Lukáš Horníček	0	0	0	0	0	0	0	0	0	0
Defenders
2	DF	(Portugal) POR	Zé Carlos	7	0	0+2	0	2	0	0	0	2+1	0
3	DF	(Brazil) BRA	Vítor Tormena	26	3	7+5	0	4+1	1	3	1	5+1	1
5	DF	(Portugal) POR	Nuno Sequeira	28	0	14+2	0	4	0	3	0	5	0
6	DF	(Portugal) POR	Rolando	9	1	5+1	0	1+1	1	0	0	1	0
16	DF	(Portugal) POR	David Carmo	21	0	11+1	0	2	0	2	0	4+1	0
22	DF	(Brazil) BRA	Caju	1	0	0+1	0	0	0	0	0	0	0
26	DF	(Colombia) COL	Cristian Borja	7	1	3+1	1	0+1	0	0	0	0+2	0
34	DF	(Brazil) BRA	Raul Silva	18	1	8+2	1	2+1	0	0	0	4+1	0
47	DF	(Portugal) POR	Ricardo Esgaio	34	3	20	1	3+2	1	3	0	6	1
74	DF	(Portugal) POR	Francisco Moura	8	2	2+3	2	0	0	0	0	1+2	0
86	DF	(Portugal) POR	Bruno Rodrigues	2	0	0+2	0	0	0	0	0	0	0
Midfielders
7	MF	(Portugal) POR	João Novais	26	2	7+8	1	2+1	1	0+3	0	3+2	0
8	MF	(Libya) LBA	Ali Elmusrati	31	2	13+4	1	4	0	2+1	0	4+3	1
10	MF	(Argentina) ARG	Nicolás Gaitán	11	2	1+5	1	0+1	0	0	0	3+1	1
15	MF	(Portugal) POR	André Horta	25	1	1+11	1	2+3	0	0	0	3+5	0
27	MF	(Brazil) BRA	Fransérgio	30	6	14+3	4	2+1	1	3	0	4+3	1
45	MF	(Portugal) POR	Iuri Medeiros	28	6	11+4	5	2+2	1	1+2	0	3+3	0
88	MF	(Portugal) POR	André Castro	25	2	13+1	2	2+1	0	3	0	4+1	0
Forwards
9	FW	(Spain) ESP	Abel Ruiz	24	6	6+6	0	4+1	5	2+1	1	2+2	0
11	FW	(Brazil) BRA	Lucas Piazon	12	3	3+4	3	1+1	0	0+1	0	1+1	0
18	FW	(Portugal) POR	Rui Fonte	0	0	0	0	0	0	0	0	0	0
19	FW	(Slovenia) SLO	Andraž Šporar	7	0	1+3	0	1	0	0	0	2	0
21	FW	(Portugal) POR	Ricardo Horta	33	12	17+1	7	2+3	2	3	0	5+2	3
57	FW	(Portugal) POR	Rodrigo Gomes	6	0	0+4	0	1	0	0+1	0	0	0
71	MF	(Guinea-Bissau) GBS	Hernâni Infande	1	0	0	0	0	0	0	0	0+1	0
90	FW	(Brazil) BRA	Galeno	34	6	17+2	2	4+1	2	3	0	7	2
99	FW	(Portugal) POR	Vítor Oliveira	1	1	0	0	0+1	1	0	0	0	0
Players who have made an appearance this season but have left the club
36	DF	(Brazil) BRA	Bruno Viana	22	2	13	2	2	0	1	0	5+1	0
20	FW	(Portugal) POR	Paulinho	24	10	12	3	2+1	1	1+2	3	5+1	3
95	FW	(Brazil) BRA	Guilherme Schettine	18	0	1+9	0	1+1	0	0	0	1+5	0

- Last updated: 25 February 2021
- Source: soccerway

=== Goalscorers ===
As of 23 May 2021

Rank	No.	Pos	Nat	Name	Primeira Liga	Taça de Portugal	Taça da Liga	Europa League	Total
1	21	FW	(Portugal)	Ricardo Horta	9	3	0	3	15
2	9	FW	(Spain)	Abel Ruiz	3	7	1	0	11
3	20	FW	(Portugal)	Paulinho (Note: Player left during the season)	3	1	3	3	10
4	27	MF	(Brazil)	Fransérgio	6	1	0	1	8
5	90	FW	(Brazil)	Galeno	3	2	0	2	7
6	11	MF	(Brazil)	Lucas Piazon	4	2	0	0	6
6	45	MF	(Portugal)	Iuri Medeiros	5	1	0	0	6
8	8	MF	(Libya)	Ali Elmusrati	3	0	0	1	4
9	3	DF	(Brazil)	Vítor Tormena	0	1	1	1	3
9	10	MF	(Argentina)	Nicolás Gaitán	2	0	0	1	3
9	17	MF	(Portugal)	João Novais	2	1	0	0	3
9	19	FW	(Slovenia)	Andraž Šporar	3	0	0	0	3
9	47	DF	(Portugal)	Ricardo Esgaio	1	1	0	1	3
14	36	DF	(Brazil)	Bruno Viana	2	0	0	0	2
14	74	DF	(Portugal)	Francisco Moura	2	0	0	0	2
14	88	MF	(Portugal)	André Castro	2	0	0	0	2
17	6	DF	(Portugal)	Rolando	0	1	0	0	1
17	15	MF	(Portugal)	André Horta	1	0	0	0	1
17	26	DF	(Colombia)	Cristian Borja	1	0	0	0	1
17	34	DF	(Brazil)	Raul Silva	1	0	0	0	1
17	99	FW	(Portugal)	Vítor Oliveira	0	1	0	0	1
Own goals					0	0	0	2	2
Totals					53	22	5	15	95
