= 2021 Taça de Portugal final =

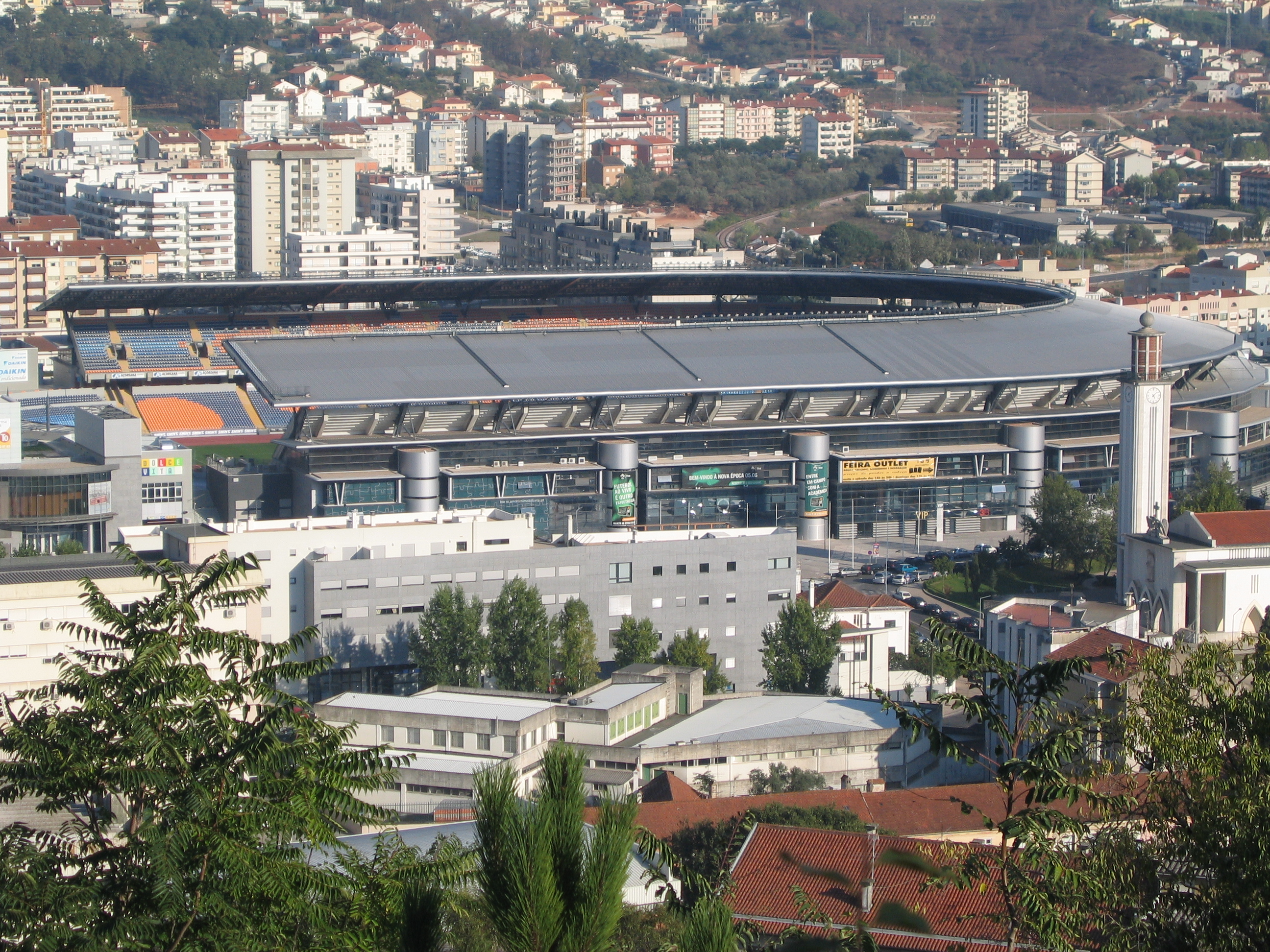
- Estádio Cidade de Coimbra
- Event: 2020–21 Taça de Portugal
Braga	Benfica
2	0
- Date: 23 May 2021
- Venue: Estádio Cidade de Coimbra, Coimbra
- Man of the Match: Galeno (Braga)
- Fair Player of the Match: Ricardo Horta (Braga)
- Referee: Nuno Almeida
- Attendance: 0 (Note: The final was played behind closed doors due to the COVID-19 pandemic in Portugal.)

The 2021 Taça de Portugal final was the final match of the 2020–21 Taça de Portugal, which decided the winner of the 81st edition of the Taça de Portugal, the premier knockout competition in Portuguese football. It was played on 23 May 2021 at the Estádio Cidade de Coimbra in Coimbra, between Braga and Benfica.

It was the 38th final for Benfica in the competition's history after they won the 2017 final and lost the 2020 final, while Braga qualified for their seventh final. The two teams faced each other for the first time in the final of the Portuguese Cup.

The defending champions were Porto, however, they were knocked out in the semi-finals by Braga.

== Route to the final ==
Braga		Round	Benfica
Opponent	Result	2020–21 Taça de Portugal	Opponent	Result
Trofense	2–1 (A)	Third round	Paredes	1–0 (A)
Olímpico Montijo	7–0 (A)	Fourth round	Vilafranquense	5–0 (H)
Torreense	5–0 (H)	Fifth round	Estrela da Amadora	4–0 (A)
Santa Clara	2–1 (H)	Quarter-finals	Belenenses SAD	3–0 (H)
Porto	1–1 (H)	Semi-finals	Estoril	3–1 (A)
Porto	3–2 (A)	Semi-finals	Estoril	2–0 (H)

Note: H = home fixture, A = away fixture

== Match ==
=== Details ===
23 May 2021
20:30 WEST

Braga	2–0	Benfica
Piazon 45+3'; R. Horta 85'	Report

Estádio Cidade de Coimbra, Coimbra
Attendance: 0
Referee: Nuno Almeida

Braga	Benfica

GK	1	(Brazil) Matheus
RB	47	(Portugal) Ricardo Esgaio (c)	(yellow card) 35'
CB	3	(Brazil) Vítor Tormena
CB	34	(Brazil) Raul Silva
LB	5	(Portugal) Nuno Sequeira
RW	21	(Portugal) Ricardo Horta
CM	8	(Libya) Ali Musrati	(yellow card) 66'	(substituted off) 75'
CM	88	(Portugal) André Castro		(substituted off) 70'
LW	90	(Brazil) Galeno
CF	9	(Spain) Abel Ruiz		(substituted off) 87'
CF	11	(Brazil) Lucas Piazon	(red card) 90+4'
Substitutes:
GK	12	(Portugal) Tiago Sá
DF	26	(Colombia) Cristian Borja
DF	86	(Portugal) Bruno Rodrigues
MF	7	(Portugal) João Novais	(yellow card) 82'	(substituted on) 70'
MF	15	(Portugal) André Horta		(substituted on) 75'
FW	18	(Portugal) Rui Fonte
FW	19	(Slovenia) Andraž Šporar		(substituted on) 87'
Manager:
(Portugal) Carlos Carvalhal

GK	77	(Brazil) Helton Leite	(red card) 16'
RB	5	(Belgium) Jan Vertonghen
CB	30	(Argentina) Nicolás Otamendi	(yellow card) 89'
LB	91	(Brazil) Morato		(substituted off) 81'
RM	17	(Portugal) Diogo Gonçalves		(substituted off) 57'
CM	28	(Germany) Julian Weigl
CM	49	(Morocco) Adel Taarabt	(red card) 90+3'
LM	3	(Spain) Álex Grimaldo	(yellow card) 90+4'
RW	21	(Portugal) Pizzi (c)		(substituted off) 21'
CF	14	(Switzerland) Haris Seferovic		(substituted off) 57'
LW	7	(Brazil) Everton		(substituted off) 57'
Substitutes:
GK	99	(Greece) Odysseas Vlachodimos		(substituted on) 21'
DF	33	(Brazil) Jardel
DF	71	(Portugal) Nuno Tavares	(yellow card) 88'	(substituted on) 57'
MF	8	(Brazil) Gabriel
MF	19	(Portugal) Chiquinho		(substituted on) 81'
MF	27	(Portugal) Rafa Silva	(yellow card) 85'	(substituted on) 57'
FW	9	(Uruguay) Darwin Núñez		(substituted on) 57'
Manager:
(Portugal) Jorge Jesus

Man of the Match:
Galeno (Braga)
Fair Player of the Match:
Ricardo Horta (Braga)

Assistant referees:
André Campos
Pedro Felisberto
Fourth official:
Rui Costa
Video assistant referee:
João Pinheiro
Assistant video assistant referees:
Tiago Martins
João Bessa Silva

Match rules

- 90 minutes
- 30 minutes of extra time if necessary
- Penalty shoot-out if scores still level
- Seven named substitutes
- Maximum of five substitutions, with a sixth allowed in extra time (Note: Each team was given only three opportunities to make substitutions, with a fourth opportunity in extra time, excluding substitutions made at half-time, before the start of extra time and at half-time in extra time.)

== See also ==
- 2020–21 S.C. Braga season
- 2020–21 S.L. Benfica season
- 2021 Taça da Liga final
