= Leandro Silva =

Leandro Silva may refer to:

- Leandro Silva (fighter) (born 1985), Brazilian MMA fighter
- Leandro Silva (equestrian) (born 1976), Brazilian Olympic equestrian
- Leandro Silva (footballer, born 1986), Brazilian footballer born Leandro Paulino Da Silva
- Leandro Silva (footballer, born 1988), Brazilian footballer born Leandro da Silva
- Leandro Silva (footballer, born 1994), Portuguese footballer born Leandro Miguel Pereira da Silva
- Leandro Silva (footballer, born 1995), Portuguese footballer born Leandro Xavier Marques Silva
- Leandro Silva (footballer, born 1999), Brazilian footballer born Leandro da Silva Alves

== See also ==
- Leandro da Silva (disambiguation)
- Leandro Almeida Silva (footballer, born 1977), Brazilian footballer
