= Afonso Figueiredo =

Portuguese footballer (born 1993)

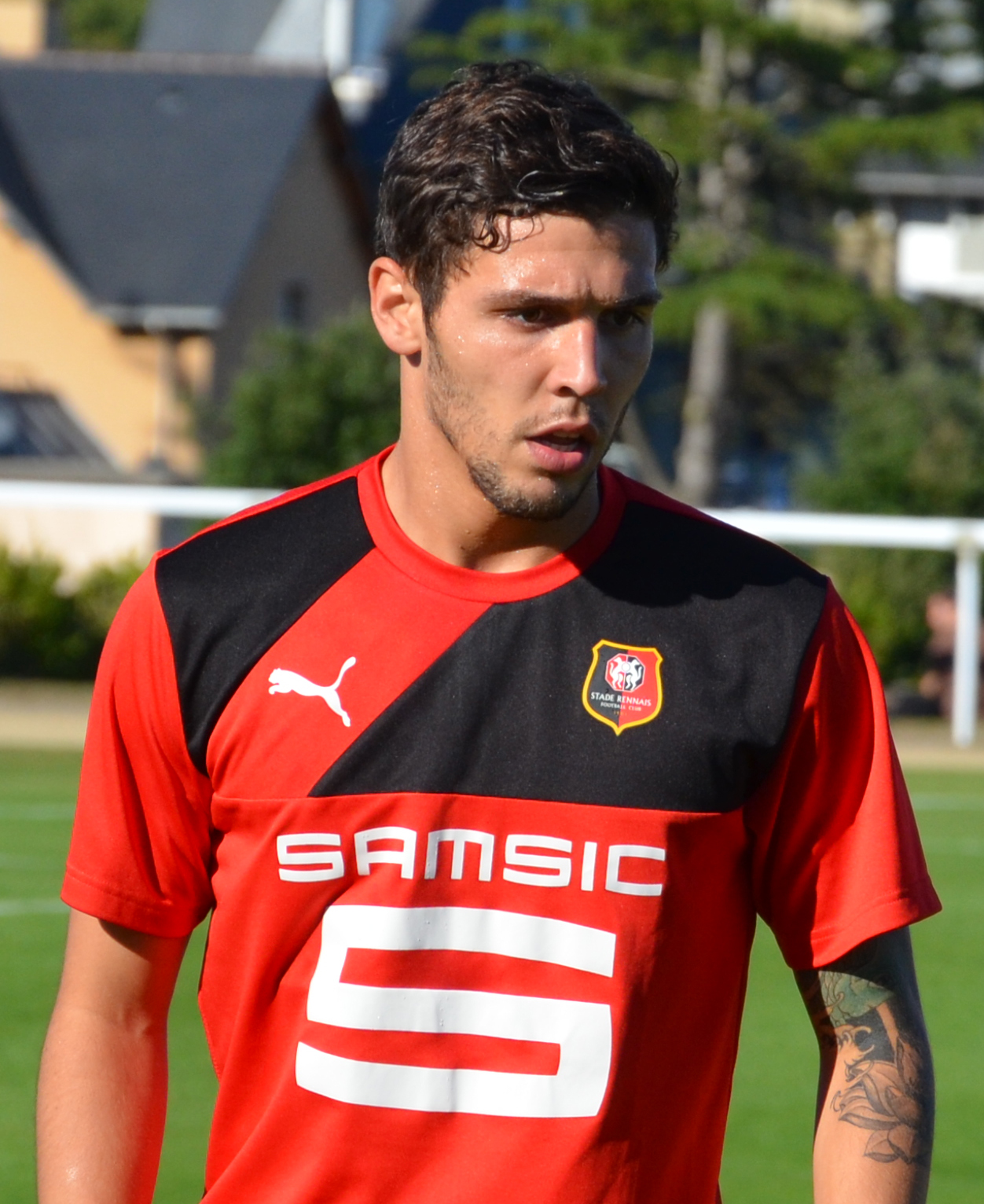
- Figueiredo with Rennes in 2016

Personal information
- Full name: Afonso Mendes Ribeiro de Figueiredo
- Date of birth: 6 January 1993 (age 33)
- Place of birth: Lisbon, Portugal
- Height: 1.69 m (5 ft 7 in)
- Position: Left-back

Youth career
- 2003–2009: Sporting CP
- 2009–2010: Belenenses
- 2010–2012: Braga

Senior career*
Years	Team	Apps	(Gls)
2012–2013	Braga B	10	(0)
2013–2016	Boavista	68	(1)
2016–2018	Rennes	10	(0)
2016–2018	Rennes II	7	(0)
2018	→ Levski Sofia (loan)	6	(0)
2018–2019	Rio Ave	10	(0)
2019–2020	Aves	21	(0)
2020–2021	Moreirense	11	(0)
2021–2022	Estrela Amadora	24	(0)
2022–2023	Penafiel	10	(0)
Total		177	(1)

International career
2016	Portugal U23	1	(0)
- * Club domestic league appearances and goals

Afonso Mendes Ribeiro de Figueiredo (born 6 January 1993) is a Portuguese former professional footballer who played as a left-back.

He played 87 Primeira Liga games for Boavista, Rio Ave, Aves and Moreirense, as well as in the second tier for Braga B, Estrela Amadora and Penafiel. Abroad, he had brief spells in the top divisions of France with Rennes and Bulgaria with Levski Sofia.

== Club career ==
=== Early years and Braga ===
Born in Lisbon, Figueiredo played youth football for three clubs, including local Sporting CP from ages 10 to 16. In the summer of 2010, he joined S.C. Braga to complete his development, and made his debut as a senior with the latter's reserves, playing his first game in the Segunda Liga on 19 August 2012 in a 0–0 home draw against Associação Naval 1º de Maio (as a late substitute).

=== Boavista ===
In the 2013 off-season, Figueiredo dropped down to the third division and signed with Boavista FC. Even though the team finished outside the promotion zone, they were reinstated in the Primeira Liga following the final developments of the Apito Dourado affair.

Figueiredo's maiden appearance in the Portuguese top flight occurred on 4 January 2015, as he featured the entire 3–1 home win over F.C. Arouca. He scored his first league goal on 16 August of that year, in a 2–2 away draw with Vitória de Setúbal.

During his spell at the Estádio do Bessa, Figueiredo totalled 72 matches in all competitions.

=== Rennes ===
On 1 July 2016, free agent Figueiredo moved to Stade Rennais F.C. from the French Ligue 1 on a four-year contract. His official debut only arrived on 1 February of the following year, in a 0–4 home loss against Paris Saint-Germain FC in the Coupe de France. His first league game took place two months later, when he played roughly 30 minutes of the 1–1 draw with Olympique Lyonnais also at the Roazhon Park.

On 30 January 2018, Figueiredo was loaned to PFC Levski Sofia from Bulgaria until the end of the season.

=== Return to Portugal ===
Figueiredo returned to his homeland on 15 June 2018, signing with Rio Ave F.C. for two years. One year later, he agreed to a three-year deal at C.D. Aves also of the top tier. In one of his first games on 31 August 2019, he was sent off in a 3–2 home loss to F.C. Famalicão.

On 29 July 2020, captain Figueiredo terminated his contract two years early after Aves' relegation. He joined Moreirense F.C. on a free transfer three months later, after serious injuries to defensive players Pedro Amador and Abdu Conté.

Figueiredo found a new club on 22 September 2021, signing for second-tier C.F. Estrela da Amadora after Gonçalo Maria's exit. For the 2022–23 campaign, he moved to F.C. Penafiel in the same league on a one-year contract.

Figueiredo retired from football in March 2024, aged 31.

== International career ==
Figueiredo played once for the Portugal Olympic team, 30 minutes in a 4–0 friendly win against Mexico in the Azores on 28 March 2016. He was not, however, selected for Rui Jorge's squad for the Olympic tournament held that year.
