= Galeno =

Brazilian footballer (born 1997)

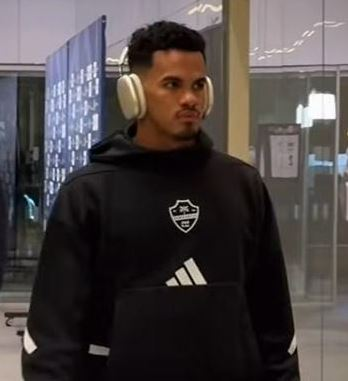
- Galeno with Al-Ahli in 2026

Personal information
- Full name: Wenderson Rodrigues do Nascimento Galeno
- Date of birth: 21 October 1997 (age 29)
- Place of birth: Barra do Corda, Maranhão, Brazil
- Height: 1.79 m (5 ft 10 in)
- Position: Winger

Team information
- Current team: Al-Ahli
- Number: 13

Youth career
- 2014–2016: Trindade

Senior career*
Years	Team	Apps	(Gls)
2015–2016	Trindade	10	(5)
2016–2017	Grêmio Anápolis	0	(0)
2016–2017	→ Porto B (loan)	37	(10)
2017–2018	Porto B	17	(5)
2017–2019	Porto	2	(0)
2018	→ Portimonense (loan)	7	(0)
2018–2019	→ Rio Ave (loan)	27	(5)
2019–2022	Braga	74	(12)
2022–2025	Porto	93	(26)
2025–	Al-Ahli	43	(5)

International career^{‡}
2024–	Brazil	1	(0)
- * Club domestic league appearances and goals as of 20:36, 20 November 2026 (UTC) ‡ National team caps and goals as of 19:45, 26 March 2024

Wenderson Rodrigues do Nascimento Galeno (born 21 October 1997), commonly known as Galeno, is a Brazilian professional footballer who plays as a winger for Saudi Pro League club Al-Ahli and the Brazil national team.

After representing two Brazilian clubs, he has spent most of his career in Portugal, playing over 100 Primeira Liga games in two spells at Porto and for Braga, as well as loan spells at Portimonense and Rio Ave. In early 2025 he joined Saudi club Al-Ahli, where he won the AFC Champions League Elite in his debut season.

== Club career ==
=== Early career ===
Born in Barra do Corda, Maranhão, Galeno joined Trindade's youth setup in 2014. He made his senior debut for the club on 10 February 2016, playing the last 29 minutes and scoring a brace in a 3–0 away win over Atlética Anapolina for the Campeonato Goiano championship.

Galeno finished the 2016 Campeonato Goiano with five goals in ten appearances, being named the Best Newcomer of the competition. In April 2016, he signed a contract with Grêmio Anápolis.

=== Porto ===
On 28 June 2016, Galeno moved abroad and joined Porto on a one-year loan deal, being initially assigned to the B-team in Segunda Liga. He made his professional debut on 7 August, starting in 2–1 away loss against Desportivo das Aves.

Galeno scored his first goal abroad on 20 August 2016, netting the winner in a 2–1 away success over neighbours Leixões. The following 16 May, after scoring 11 goals for the B's, he was bought outright by the Dragons, signing a five-year deal with a €40 million release clause.

Galeno made his first team – and Primeira Liga – debut for Porto on 21 October 2017, coming on as a late substitute for Moussa Marega in a 6–1 home routing of Paços de Ferreira. Three days later he made his first start in the group stage of the Taça da Liga, a goalless draw with Leixões also at the Estádio do Dragão.

On 23 January 2018, Galeno was presented at fellow top tier side Portimonense, on loan until June. He returned to Porto in July, after contributing with seven appearances, only one start.

Galeno was loaned to another club in the main category on 11 July 2018, Rio Ave, for the entire upcoming season. He made his European debut 15 days later away to Jagiellonia Białystok in the UEFA Europa League second qualifying round, and on 2 August scored twice in the first half of the second leg, a 4–4 home draw that saw his team eliminated.

Galeno was a regular starter for the Vila do Conde side during the year, scoring eight goals in 35 appearances overall. His first goal in the top flight came on 26 August, opening a 1–1 draw at Tondela on the third matchday.

=== Braga ===
On 6 August 2019, Galeno joined Braga on a five-year deal. The transfer fee was €3.5 million to be paid in instalments, plus value-added tax to take the fee to €4.3 million; the buyout clause of €15 million meant that Porto retained 50% of his economic rights.

Galeno scored his first goal in the third game of the league season, opening the score after six minutes in a 1–1 draw at Gil Vicente on 25 August 2019. On 3 November, he scored twice in as many minutes in a home game against neighbours Famalicão in a 2–2 draw. He played four games without scoring in the 2019–20 Taça da Liga, including the 1–0 final win over his previous team Porto on 25 January. On 25 June 2020, he settled a 3–2 derby win over Vitória de Guimarães at the Estádio Municipal de Braga.

On 23 May 2021, Galeno was named the man of the match after Braga defeated Benfica 2–0 in the 2021 Taça de Portugal Final, to claim the cup competition for the third time in club history.

Galeno scored six goals in as many Europa League group games for Braga in 2021–22; this included two on 30 September in a 3–1 home win over Denmark's Midtjylland. In his final game on 22 January 2022, he scored a penalty to equalise in a 2–1 win at reigning champions Sporting.

=== Return to Porto ===
On 31 January 2022, Porto reached an agreement to purchase Galeno for €9 million from Braga, on a contract until the summer of 2026. The buyout clause was €50 million. His first goal for the club came on 13 March in a 4–0 home win over Tondela, three minutes after coming on for Vitinha. Later that year, on 4 October, he scored his first Champions League goal in a 2–0 victory over Bayer Leverkusen. On 13 December 2023, he scored a brace in a 5–3 victory over Shakhtar Donetsk which qualified his club to the Champions League knockout phase.

On 15 January 2024, Galeno extended his contract with Porto until 2028, with a new release clause being set at €60 million. A month later, on 21 February, he scored a late goal to secure a 1–0 win over Arsenal in the first leg of the Champions League round of 16. Though, in the second leg on 12 March, he missed the final penalty in the shoot-out as Porto were eliminated from the tournament.

=== Al-Ahli ===
On 31 January 2025, Galeno joined the Saudi club Al-Ahli for reported transfer fee of €50m. In his debut season, he became a member of the squad that won the first-ever AFC Champions League Elite title, scoring a 35th-minute goal in a 2–0 win over Japanese side Kawasaki Frontale in the final, which was held in Jeddah on 3 May 2025.

== International career ==
On 11 March 2024, Galeno received his first call up to the Brazil national football team, ahead of friendlies against England and Spain. His debut came a fortnight later, as he came off the bench for Rodrygo on the 82nd minute of the latter match, while the game was tied 2–2. In stoppage time, and after Spain had scored and put the scoreline at 3–2, Galeno suffered a foul inside the box, which Lucas Paquetá converted to fix the final scoreline at 3–3.

== Personal life ==
In March 2022, Galeno was naturalised as a Portuguese citizen after five years of residence in the country.

== Career statistics ==
=== Club ===
As of match played 9 October 2026

Appearances and goals by club, season and competition
Club	Season	League			National cup (Note: Includes Taça de Portugal, King's Cup)		League cup (Note: Includes Taça da Liga)		Continental		Other		Total	
Club	Season	Division	Apps	Goals	Apps	Goals	Apps	Goals	Apps	Goals	Apps	Goals	Apps	Goals
Trindade	2016	Campeonato Goiano	10	5	—		—		—		—		10	5
Grémio Anápolis	2016	Campeonato Goiano Second Division	0	0	—		—		—		—		0	0
Porto B (loan)	2016–17	LigaPro	37	10	—		—		—		—		37	10
Porto B	2017–18	LigaPro	17	5	—		—		—		—		17	5
Porto B	Porto B total		54	15	—		—		—		—		54	15
Porto	2017–18	Primeira Liga	2	0	1	1	1	0	0	0	—		4	1
Portimonense (loan)	2017–18	Primeira Liga	7	0	0	0	0	0	—		—		7	0
Rio Ave (loan)	2018–19	Primeira Liga	27	5	3	1	4	1	2 (Note: Appearances in UEFA Europa League)	2	—		36	9
Braga	2019–20	Primeira Liga	27	6	1	0	4	0	9	1	—		41	7
Braga	2020–21	Primeira Liga	33	3	7	2	3	0	7	2	—		50	7
Braga	2021–22	Primeira Liga	14	3	2	1	1	0	6	6	1 (Note: Appearance in Supertaça Cândido de Oliveira)	0	24	10
Braga	Total		74	12	10	3	8	0	22	9	1	0	115	24
Porto	2021–22	Primeira Liga	12	1	2	0	0	0	4	0	—		18	1
Porto	2022–23	Primeira Liga	31	8	6	3	6	2	8 (Note: Appearances in UEFA Champions League)	2	1	0	52	15
Porto	2023–24	Primeira Liga	31	9	7	2	2	0	7	5	1	0	48	16
Porto	2024–25	Primeira Liga	18	8	2	0	2	2	8	1	1	2	31	13
Porto	Total		93	26	17	5	10	4	27	8	3	2	149	45
Al-Ahli	2024–25	Saudi Pro League	11	3	—		—		7 (Note: Appearances in AFC Champions League Elite)	4	—		18	7
Al-Ahli	2025–26	Saudi Pro League	23	1	3	0	—		8	3	3 (Note: Two appearances in Saudi Super Cup, one appearance in FIFA Intercontinental Cup)	0	37	4
Al-Ahli	2026–27	Saudi Pro League	7	0	1	1	—		1	0	2 (Note: Appearances in FIFA Intercontinental Cup)	0	11	1
Al-Ahli	Total		41	4	4	1	—		16	7	5	0	66	12
Career total			308	67	35	11	23	5	67	26	9	2	441	111

=== International ===
As of match played 26 March 2024

Appearances and goals by national team and year
National team	Year	Apps	Goals
Brazil	2024	1	0
Total		1	0

== Honours ==
Braga

- Taça de Portugal: 2020–21
- Taça da Liga: 2019–20

Porto

- Primeira Liga: 2017–18, 2021–22
- Taça de Portugal: 2021–22, 2022–23, 2023–24
- Taça da Liga: 2022–23
- Supertaça Cândido de Oliveira: 2022, 2024

Al-Ahli

- AFC Champions League Elite: 2024–25, 2025–26
- Saudi Super Cup: 2025

Individual

- Campeonato Goiano Best Newcomer: 2016
- LigaPro Player of the Month: September 2017
- 2021 Taça de Portugal Final: Man of the Match
- UEFA Europa League top assist provider: 2019–20, 2020–21
