= Abílio Novais =

Portuguese footballer

Personal information
- Full name: Abílio António Gomes Novais
- Date of birth: 24 June 1967 (age 59)
- Place of birth: Vila Nova de Gaia, Portugal
- Height: 1.65 m (5 ft 5 in)
- Position: Attacking midfielder

Team information
- Current team: Valadares Gaia (manager)

Youth career
- 1980−1984: Candal
- 1984−1985: Porto

Senior career*
Years	Team	Apps	(Gls)
1985−1986	Oliveirense		
1986−1987	União Lamas		
1987−1989	Leixões	76	(0)
1989−1991	Porto	10	(2)
1991−1994	Salgueiros	81	(9)
1994−1995	Belenenses	21	(1)
1995−1999	Salgueiros	135	(26)
1999−2000	Campomaiorense	30	(5)
2000−2001	Aves	27	(3)
2001−2003	Leixões	47	(12)
Total		427	(58)

Managerial career
- 2002–2003: Leixões
- 2004: Vilanovense
- 2004: Varzim
- 2010–2011: São Pedro da Cova
- 2011–2012: Boavista (youth)
- 2018: Canidelo
- 2019–2020: Vila
- 2020–2022: Avintes
- 2022–2025: Oliveira Douro
- 2025–: Valadares Gaia
- * Club domestic league appearances and goals

Abílio António Gomes Novais (born 24 August 1967), known simply as Abílio as a player, is a Portuguese former professional footballer who played as an attacking midfielder. He is currently manager of Valadares Gaia FC.

Over the course of 13 seasons, he amassed Primeira Liga totals of 342 matches and 46 goals, mainly at Salgueiros.

== Club career ==
Born in Vila Nova de Gaia, Porto District, Abílio competed in the Primeira Liga from 1988 to 2001, starting by playing all 38 games for Leixões S.C. as the season ended in relegation. He nonetheless signed for FC Porto, being rarely used during his tenure as he was acquired to be a right-back and was barred in that position by legendary João Pinto, and subsequently joined S.C. Salgueiros.

Abílio totalled 26 league goals for Salgueiros in his last four years, then moved to S.C. Campomaiorense and C.D. Aves, retiring in 2003 at the age of 36 with his first club Leixões, in the third division. He subsequently started working as a manager.

== Personal life ==
Novais' son, João, was also a footballer and a midfielder. He too played for Leixões.
