= Oriental Dragon FC =

Portuguese football club

- Full name: Oriental Dragon Football Club
- Nickname: Dragons
- Founded: 2014
- Dissolved: 2024
- Stadium: Campo Santos Jorge

Oriental Dragon Football Club was a Portuguese football club based in Moita. The club was founded in 2014 with the goal of training Chinese players under Portuguese coaching.

== History ==
In 2014, the club was founded by WSports Seven led by investor Qi Chen, who had been working with Portuguese clubs since 2006 and had arranged the transfers of Chinese players Yu Dabao and Wang Gang to top Portuguese club S.L. Benfica in 2006 and 2007. The club was created to include Chinese players under Portuguese coaching, with the goal of them eventually returning to China and improving the quality of that country's league and national team. The club are members of the Setúbal Football Association. The club initially was composed exclusively of Chinese footballers between 15 and 19 years in 2014, after creating their own U21 youth league called the Future Stars league as some of the players were too young to play in the official leagues due to being under 18, and included clubs from the Lisbon and Setúbal football associations, which they funded, and required each team to field at least one Chinese player. Due to Chen's connection with Benfica, he was able to have many former Benfica B coaches join the club. They also initially began as a second team to C.D. Pinhalnovense.

The club officially began play in the Portuguese football league system during the 2015–16 season in the fifth-tier Setúbal FA Second Division, finishing eighth with nine Chinese players on the roster. In the 2017–18 season, they finished second in the division earning promotion to the Setúbal FA First Division. In 2018–19, they were the finalists in the AF Setúbal Cup. In 2019–20, they won the Setúbal FA First Division, at the time of its cancellation due to the COVID-19 pandemic, 11 points ahead of the second-place club F.C. Barreirense, earning promotion to the third-tier Campeonato de Portugal at the national level. In the 2020–21 Taça de Portugal, they were defeated on penalties in the third round by second tier side Leixões. In 2021–22, they moved up to the newly created third-tier Liga 3. In the 2021–22 Taça de Portugal, they were defeated 3-2 in extra time in the third round by first tier side Moreirense, while in their league division, after finishing in last in both the division and the relegation series, they were relegated back to the Campeonato de Portugal (now the fourth tier).

The Club ceased operations in 2024; however, some speculation has been made about a renewal of the club in the lower leagues of the Portuguese footballing system after a hypothetical club facility is constructed, but to date, no construction of such facility is underway.

== Year-by-year ==
Season	Tier	League	Record	Rank	Domestic cup	AF Setúbal Taça	Ref
2015–16	5	AF Setúbal 2ª Division	5–2–9 (Phase 1)	8th (of 9)	–	Group Stage	
2016–17	5	AF Setúbal 2ª Division	12–6–14	11th (of 17)	–	Quarter-Finals	
2017–18	5	AF Setúbal 2ª Division	9–2–5 (Phase 1); 7–6–1 (Phase 2)	3rd (of 9); 2nd (of 8)	–	Quarter-Finals	
2018–19	4	AF Setúbal 1ª Division	16–5–9	6th (of 16)	–	Finalists	
2019–20	4	AF Setúbal 1ª Division	14–3–1	1st (of 16)	–	Round of 16	
2020–21	3 (Note: The Campeonato de Portugal was the third tier until 2020–21. In 2021–22, Liga 3 was created and became the new third tier, pushing the Campeonato de Portugal down to become the fourth tier (as well as all other subsequent divisions).)	Campeonato de Portugal	11–4–7 (Série G); 3–2–1 (Liga 3 promotion phase)	3rd (of 12); 1st (of 4)	Third Round	–	
2021–22	3	Liga 3	2–12–8 (Série South); 0–3–3 (Relegation Series)	12th (of 12); 4th (of 4)	Third Round	–	
2022–23	4	Campeonato de Portugal	10–6–10 (Série D)	9th (of 14)	Second round	–	
2023–24	5	AF Setúbal 1ª Division	12–7–10	5th (of 16)	–	Round of 16	
