= Nuno Sequeira =

Portuguese footballer

Personal information
- Full name: Nuno Miguel Ribeiro Cruz Jerónimo Sequeira
- Date of birth: 19 August 1990 (age 36)
- Place of birth: Porto, Portugal
- Height: 1.84 m (6 ft 0 in)
- Position: Left-back

Team information
- Current team: Fafe

Youth career
- 1999–2006: Senhora da Hora
- 2006–2009: Leixões

Senior career*
Years	Team	Apps	(Gls)
2009–2010	Leixões	0	(0)
2009–2010	→ Leça (loan)	14	(2)
2010–2011	Leça	27	(3)
2011–2013	Leixões	38	(1)
2011–2012	→ Fafe (loan)	27	(10)
2013–2017	Nacional	74	(1)
2017–2023	Braga	121	(1)
2023–2026	Pendikspor	88	(4)
2026–	Fafe	5	(0)

International career
2008	Portugal U18	3	(0)
- * Club domestic league appearances and goals as of 21:42, 20 September 2026 (UTC)

Nuno Miguel Ribeiro Cruz Jerónimo Sequeira (born 19 August 1990) is a Portuguese professional footballer who plays as a left-back for Liga 3 club Fafe.

He made 195 Primeira Liga appearances for Nacional and Braga, winning the 2020–21 Taça de Portugal and the 2019–20 Taça da Liga with the latter club.

== Club career ==
=== Early career ===
Born in Porto, Sequeira finished his development at Leixões SC. He made his senior debut in the lower leagues, with Leça F.C. and AD Fafe.

Sequeira returned to the Estádio do Mar for the 2012–13 season. He made his first appearance in the Segunda Liga on 12 August 2012, playing the full 90 minutes in a 1–0 home win against C.S. Marítimo B.

=== Nacional ===
Sequeira signed with Primeira Liga club C.D. Nacional in late March 2013, with the four-year contract being made effective in the summer. His maiden game in the competition took place on 23 November of the same year in a 1–1 draw away to FC Porto where he also started, but he totalled just 13 matches in his first two seasons.

Sequeira scored his first goal in the Portuguese top division on 27 November 2015, contributing to a 3–1 home victory over C.S. Marítimo in the Madeira derby. Starting in all of his 31 appearances during the campaign, he helped his team to a final 11th position in the table.

=== Braga ===
On 24 May 2017, following Nacional's relegation in last place, Sequeira moved to fellow top-tier side S.C. Braga on a four-year deal. He scored his first goal on 30 October 2018, in a 5–0 home defeat of his previous club in the group stage of the Taça da Liga.

Sequeira played the full 90 minutes on 25 January 2020, as they won the aforementioned tournament by a single goal in the final against Porto. His season ended six games early in June, due to a left-thigh muscle injury at the end of the derby with Vitória de Guimarães.

On 7 November 2021, in the dying minutes of the first half of an eventual 6–1 away loss against S.L. Benfica, Sequeira ruptured the anterior cruciate ligament in his left knee, being sidelined for the campaign. He returned the following August for the start of the new season, assisting in a 3–3 draw with Sporting CP in the opener and then scoring his first Braga league goal in a 3–0 win at F.C. Famalicão.

=== Pendikspor ===
On 2 July 2023, after 184 competitive appearances for Braga (two goals), Sequeira joined recently-promoted Süper Lig club Pendikspor on a two-year contract. He suffered relegation in his debut campaign, scoring in a 4–0 home win over Beşiktaş J.K. on 20 January 2024.

== International career ==
In October 2020, Fernando Santos called Sequeira to the Portugal national team for the first time, ahead of a friendly with Spain and the UEFA Nations League matches against France and Sweden to be held in that month.

== Career statistics ==
As of match played 14 May 2023

Appearances and goals by club, season and competition
Club	Season	League			Cup		League cup		Europe		Other		Total	
Club	Season	Division	Apps	Goals	Apps	Goals	Apps	Goals	Apps	Goals	Apps	Goals	Apps	Goals
Leixões	2011–12	Liga de Honra	0	0	0	0	—		—		—		0	0
Leixões	2012–13	Segunda Liga	38	1	2	0	2	0	—		—		42	1
Leixões	Total		38	1	2	0	2	0	—		—		42	1
Nacional	2013–14	Primeira Liga	5	0	0	0	2	0	—		—		7	0
Nacional	2014–15	Primeira Liga	8	0	0	0	2	0	0	0	—		10	0
Nacional	2015–16	Primeira Liga	32	1	3	0	2	0	—		—		37	1
Nacional	2016–17	Primeira Liga	29	0	—		—		—		—		29	0
Nacional	Total		74	1	3	0	6	0	0	0	—		83	1
Braga	2017–18	Primeira Liga	7	0	0	0	2	0	3 (Note: Appearances in UEFA Europa League)	0	—		12	0
Braga	2018–19	Primeira Liga	29	0	6	0	3	1	2	0	—		40	1
Braga	2019–20	Primeira Liga	25	0	2	0	4	0	10	0	—		41	0
Braga	2020–21	Primeira Liga	26	0	5	0	3	0	5	0	—		39	0
Braga	2021–22	Primeira Liga	7	0	0	0	1	0	4	0	1 (Note: Appearance in Supertaça Cândido de Oliveira)	0	13	0
Braga	2022–23	Primeira Liga	27	1	3	0	2	0	7 (Note: Six appearances in UEFA Europa League, one appearance in UEFA Europa Conference League)	0	—		39	1
Braga	Total		121	1	16	0	15	1	31	0	1	0	184	2
Career total			233	3	21	0	23	1	31	0	1	0	309	4

== Honours ==
Braga

- Taça de Portugal: 2020–21
- Taça da Liga: 2019–20
