= Leandro da Silva =

Leandro da Silva is a Portuguese name and may refer to:

== Football players ==
=== Brazil ===
- Leandro Almeida Silva (footballer, born 1987) (born Leandro Almeida da Silva)
- Leandro Castán (born Leandro Castán da Silva in 1986)
- Leandro Cuca (born Leandro da Silva in 1973)
- Leandro Donizete (born Leandro Donizete Gonçalves da Silva in 1982)
- Leandro Gil Miranda da Silva (born 1978)
- Leandro Love, (born Leandro Rodrigues da Silva in 1985)
- Leandro Mariano da Silva (born 1989)
- Leandro Montera da Silva (born 1985)
- Leandro Paulino da Silva (born 1986)
- Leandro da Silva (footballer, born 1985)
- Leandro da Silva (footballer, born 1989)
- Leandro Silva (footballer, born 1988) (born Leandro da Silva)
- Tigrão (born Leandro Antonio da Silva in 1982)

=== Portugal ===
- Leandro Silva (Portuguese footballer) (born Leandro Miguel Pereira da Silva in 1994)

== Other people ==
- Leandro Araújo da Silva (born 1983), Brazilian volleyball player; see 2009 FIVB Volleyball Men's World Grand Champions Cup squads

== See also ==
- Leandro Silva (disambiguation)
