= Tiago Sá =

Portuguese footballer (born 1995)

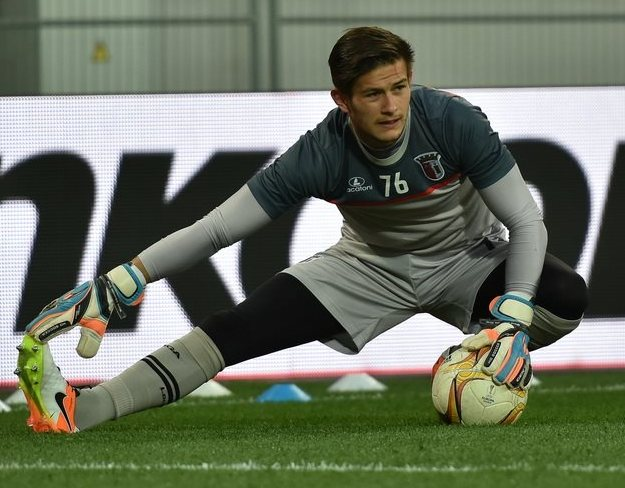
- Sá with Braga in 2016

Personal information
- Full name: Tiago Magalhães de Sá
- Date of birth: 11 January 1995 (age 31)
- Place of birth: Moure, Portugal
- Height: 1.86 m (6 ft 1 in)
- Position: Goalkeeper

Team information
- Current team: Braga
- Number: 12

Youth career
- 2005–2014: Braga

Senior career*
Years	Team	Apps	(Gls)
2013–2018	Braga B	128	(0)
2018–	Braga	39	(0)

International career
2012−2013	Portugal U18	6	(0)
2013−2014	Portugal U19	13	(0)
2014−2015	Portugal U20	3	(0)
Medal record
Men's football
Representing Portugal
UEFA European Under-19 Championship
Runner-up	2014 Hungary
- * Club domestic league appearances and goals as of 18:54, 26 April 2026 (UTC)

Tiago Magalhães de Sá (born 11 January 1995) is a Portuguese professional footballer who plays as a goalkeeper for Primeira Liga club Braga.

Developed at Braga, where he was mainly a reserve and back-up, he made over 60 first-team appearances and won the 2020–21 Taça de Portugal and two Taça da Liga.

== Club career ==
Born in the village of Moure in Vila Verde, Braga District, Sá joined S.C. Braga's youth system at the age of 10. He spent his first five seasons as a senior with the reserves in the Segunda Liga, his first match in the competition being played on 11 August 2013 in a 1−2 home loss against C.D. Tondela. He was called up to the first team for a home game against Académica de Coimbra on 6 January 2016 due to injury to regular back-up Matheus, and remained unused as Stanislav Kritsyuk played in the 3–0 win.

Early into the 2018−19 campaign, Sá became the first team's first choice due to a serious knee injury contracted by the Brazilian. His Primeira Liga debut took place on 31 August, in a 1−0 away victory over G.D. Chaves.

Sá was voted Braga's Newcomer of the Year in January 2019. Days later, he signed a new contract to tie himself to the club until 2023. He lost his place after Matheus returned to fitness.

Sá's one match as Braga won the Taça da Liga in 2019–20 was the final group game, a 4–1 win at F.C. Paços de Ferreira. He played their first three rounds as they claimed the Taça de Portugal in the following season. In June 2023, he extended his link for four more years.

Subsequently, Sá played second-fiddle to Matheus and Czech Lukáš Horníček.

== International career ==
Sá earned 22 caps for Portugal from under-18 to under-20 level, between 2012 and 2015. He was part of the under-19 team that came runners-up at the 2014 UEFA European Championship; his only game was in the semi-final against reigning champions Serbia, coming on as a substitute for the injured André Moreira in the fourth minute of extra time and saving from Sergej Milinković-Savić to win the penalty shootout.

== Career statistics ==
As of match played 26 April 2026

Appearances and goals by club, season and competition
Club	Season	League			Taça de Portugal		Taça da Liga		Europe		Total	
Club	Season	Division	Apps	Goals	Apps	Goals	Apps	Goals	Apps	Goals	Apps	Goals
Braga B	2013–14	Liga Portugal 2	17	0	—		—		—		17	0
Braga B	2014–15	Liga Portugal 2	33	0	—		—		—		33	0
Braga B	2015–16	Liga Portugal 2	35	0	—		—		—		35	0
Braga B	2016–17	Liga Portugal 2	31	0	—		—		—		31	0
Braga B	2017–18	Liga Portugal 2	12	0	—		—		—		12	0
Braga B	Total		128	0	—		—		—		128	0
Braga	2015–16	Primeira Liga	0	0	0	0	0	0	—		0	0
Braga	2016–17	Primeira Liga	0	0	0	0	0	0	—		0	0
Braga	2017–18	Primeira Liga	0	0	0	0	1	0	0	0	1	0
Braga	2018–19	Primeira Liga	31	0	0	0	0	0	0	0	31	0
Braga	2019–20	Primeira Liga	1	0	1	0	1	0	1 (Note: Appearances in UEFA Europa League)	0	4	0
Braga	2020–21	Primeira Liga	2	0	3	0	0	0	2	0	7	0
Braga	2021–22	Primeira Liga	1	0	2	0	2	0	1	0	6	0
Braga	2022–23	Primeira Liga	3	0	3	0	1	0	1 (Note: Appearance in UEFA Europa Conference League)	0	8	0
Braga	2023–24	Primeira Liga	0	0	1	0	0	0	0	0	1	0
Braga	2024–25	Primeira Liga	0	0	0	0	0	0	0	0	0	0
Braga	2025–26	Primeira Liga	1	0	3	0	0	0	0	0	4	0
Braga	Total		39	0	13	0	5	0	5	0	62	0
Career total			167	0	13	0	5	0	5	0	190	0

== Honours ==
Braga

- Taça de Portugal: 2020–21
- Taça da Liga: 2019–20, 2023–24
