= Onyekachi Silas =

Nigerian footballer

Personal information
- Full name: Onyekachi Eze Silas
- Date of birth: 10 June 1996 (age 30)
- Place of birth: Kaduna, Nigeria
- Height: 1.72 m (5 ft 8 in)
- Positions: Winger; forward

Youth career
- –2014: Ascend Football Academy
- 2014–2015: Boavista

Senior career*
Years	Team	Apps	(Gls)
2015–2017	Boavista	0	(0)
2015–2017	→ Gondomar (loan)	40	(9)
2017–2018	Marinhense	29	(15)
2018–2019	Gil Vicente	18	(5)
2019–2020	Vilafranquense	5	(0)
2020–2021	Torreense	24	(7)
2021–2022	Alverca	14	(1)
2022–2023	Paredes	21	(1)
2023	Varzim	6	(0)
- * Club domestic league appearances and goals as of 1 January 2024

Onyekachi Eze Silas (born 10 June 1996) is a Nigerian professional footballer who plays as a winger or forward.
