= 2016 Campeonato Goiano =

Campeonato Goiano
- Season: 2016
- Champions: Goiás
- Relegated: Trindade and Anapolina
- Matches: 76
- Goals: 146 (1.92 per match)
- Top goalscorer: Nonato (Goianésia) 10 goals

The 2016 Campeonato Goiano was the 73rd season of Goiás' top professional football league. The season began on 30 January, and will conclude in May.

== Teams ==
- Anapolina
- Anápolis
- Aparecidense
- Atlético Goianiense
- CRAC
- Goianésia
- Goiás
- Itumbiara
- Trindade
- Vila Nova

== League tables ==
=== Group A ===
Pos	Team	Pld	W	D	L	GF	GA	GD	Pts	Qualification or relegation
1	Goiás	14	10	2	2	25	11	+14	32	Qualification to the Play-offs
2	Anápolis	14	6	3	5	16	3	+13	21	Qualification to the Play-offs
3	Itumbiara	14	4	6	4	10	11	−1	18	
4	CRAC	14	4	3	7	11	16	−5	15	
5	Trindade	14	3	2	9	14	21	−7	11	Relegation to the 2017 Campeonato Goiano (lower levels)

Updated to match(es) played on 26 February 2016. Source: Group A
Rules for classification: 1) points; 2) goal difference; 3) number of goals scored.

=== Group B ===
Pos	Team	Pld	W	D	L	GF	GA	GD	Pts	Qualification or relegation
1	Atlético Goianiense	14	9	3	2	18	6	+12	30	Qualification to the Play-offs
2	Vila Nova	14	5	6	3	10	10	0	21	Qualification to the Play-offs
3	Aparecidense	14	3	8	3	11	12	−1	17	
4	Goianésia	14	4	3	7	15	19	−4	15	
5	Anapolina	14	3	3	8	7	18	−11	12	Relegation to the 2017 Campeonato Goiano (lower levels)

Updated to match(es) played on 26 February 2016. Source: Group B
Rules for classification: 1) points; 2) goal difference; 3) number of goals scored.

== Final stage ==
Semifinals
1	Goiás	1	1	2
4	Vila Nova	1	0	1
2	Atlético Goianiense	0	1	1
3	Anápolis	1	2	3

Finals
1	Goiás	0	1	1 (5)
2	Anápolis	0	1	1 (4)
