= Júnior Franco =

Portuguese footballer

Júnior
Personal information
- Full name: José Carlos Silva Franco
- Date of birth: 29 July 1995 (age 31)
- Place of birth: Lisbon, Portugal
- Height: 1.80 m (5 ft 11 in)
- Position: Defensive midfielder

Team information
- Current team: Tirsense
- Number: 14

Youth career
- 2004–2010: Vitória SC
- 2010–2011: Os Sandinenses
- 2011–2014: Vitória SC

Senior career*
Years	Team	Apps	(Gls)
2013–2015	Vitória SC B	2	(0)
2015–2016	AD Oliveirense	12	(1)
2016	Felgueiras 1932	11	(1)
2016–2017	Pedras Salgadas	32	(2)
2017–2018	Gafanha	25	(1)
2018–2019	Famalicão	0	(0)
2018–2019	→ Fafe (loan)	29	(2)
2019–2020	Mafra	20	(0)
2020–2021	Penafiel	30	(2)
2022–2023	Vilafranquense	0	(0)
2023	AVS	0	(0)
2024	Marco 09	8	(0)
2024–	Tirsense	18	(1)
- * Club domestic league appearances and goals as of 17:45, 23 February 2025 (UTC)

José Carlos Silva Franco (born 29 July 1995) known as Júnior, is a Portuguese footballer who plays as a defensive midfielder for Tirsense.
