= João Novais =

Portuguese footballer

Personal information
- Full name: João Pedro Barradas Novais
- Date of birth: 10 July 1993 (age 33)
- Place of birth: Vila Nova de Gaia, Portugal
- Height: 1.83 m (6 ft 0 in)
- Position: Midfielder

Team information
- Current team: Al-Najma
- Number: 7

Youth career
- 2001–2007: Coimbrões
- 2007–2010: Porto
- 2008–2009: → Padroense (loan)
- 2010–2012: Leixões

Senior career*
Years	Team	Apps	(Gls)
2012–2015	Leixões	71	(5)
2015–2018	Rio Ave	56	(10)
2018–2022	Braga	73	(3)
2021–2022	→ Alanyaspor (loan)	29	(3)
2022–2023	Al Bataeh	25	(6)
2023–2024	Alanyaspor	32	(5)
2024–2025	Rio Ave	32	(0)
2025–2026	Al-Jabalain	33	(14)
2026–	Al-Najma	11	(9)
- * Club domestic league appearances and goals as of 23:31, 10 November 2026 (UTC)

João Pedro Barradas Novais (born 10 July 1993) is a Portuguese professional footballer who plays as a midfielder for Saudi First Division League club Al-Najma.

He played 161 Primeira Liga games and scored 13 goals for Rio Ave and Braga, winning the 2019–20 Taça da Liga and the 2020–21 Taça de Portugal with the latter club. He also had spells in Turkey, the United Arab Emirates and Saudi Arabia.

== Club career ==
=== Leixões ===
Born in Vila Nova de Gaia, Porto metropolitan area, Novais was in the youth ranks of FC Porto before concluding his development at nearby Leixões SC. He scored his first professional goal on 11 May 2014 in the final game of the Segunda Liga season, a penalty kick to equalise in a 1–1 home draw against C.F. União.

=== Rio Ave ===
On 3 July 2015, Novais signed for Primeira Liga club Rio Ave F.C. on a four-year deal. He scored twice in his first season with the team from Vila do Conde, including the leveller in a 1–1 draw at Porto on 6 January. In 2017–18 he recorded a career-best eight league goals (mostly from free kicks), and two more in the Taça da Liga in a 3–2 group stage home win over former team Leixões.

=== Braga ===
Novais transferred to fellow top-flight club S.C. Braga in May 2018, on a five-year deal after activating his €1.5 million buyout clause. He scored his first goal on 16 August in a 2–2 home draw with FC Zorya Luhansk in the third qualifying round of the UEFA Europa League, though his side was eliminated on the away goals rule; his first league season at the Estádio Municipal de Braga yielded one goal, consolation in the 6–2 away loss to S.L. Benfica on 23 December.

On 25 January 2020, Novais was a last-minute substitute for João Palhinha in the League Cup final, which his team won 1–0 against Porto. Four days later he was sent off at the end of a 2–1 victory at nearby Moreirense F.C. for a foul on Abdu Conté, and missed the next game against Sporting CP through suspension. In the following season's Taça de Portugal, he scored a penalty kick in a 7–0 defeat of Clube Olímpico do Montijo in the fourth round, and came off the bench in the 2–1 final win over Benfica on 23 May 2021.

Novais was loaned to Alanyaspor of the Turkish Süper Lig on 19 August 2021 with an option to buy. He shared teams with compatriots José Marafona, Daniel Candeias and Wilson Eduardo during his one season.

=== Al Bataeh ===
Novais cancelled the last year of his Braga contract on 11 August 2022, and signed for UAE Pro League side Al Bataeh Club. He scored on his debut on 2 September, concluding a 2–0 win at Ittihad Kalba FC on the first day of the campaign.

=== Later career ===
On 11 July 2023, Novais returned to Alanyaspor on a two-year deal. He went back to Portugal for the 2024–25 season, however, on a contract of the same duration at Rio Ave, also his former employers.

On 10 September 2025, Novais joined Saudi First Division League club Al-Jabalain Club. He made his debut a day later, in the 2–1 victory against Al-Batin FC.

Novais remained in that country and division for 2026–27, signing a one-year contract with Al-Najma SC.

== Personal life ==
Novais' father Abílio also played as a midfielder, being best known for his spell at S.C. Salgueiros in the late 1990s.

== Honours ==
Braga

- Taça de Portugal: 2020–21
- Taça da Liga: 2019–20
