= Tiago Mesquita =

Portuguese footballer

Personal information
- Full name: Tiago Manuel Oliveira Mesquita
- Date of birth: 23 November 1990 (age 35)
- Place of birth: Ribeirão, Portugal
- Height: 1.80 m (5 ft 11 in)
- Position: Right-back

Team information
- Current team: Paços Ferreira
- Number: 2

Youth career
- 2000–2005: Trofense
- 2005–2008: Ribeirão

Senior career*
Years	Team	Apps	(Gls)
2008–2009	Ribeirão	16	(0)
2009–2011	Alavés	25	(0)
2011–2013	Naval	19	(0)
2013–2014	Trofense	40	(0)
2014–2015	Ribeirão	11	(0)
2015	Freamunde	24	(0)
2015–2018	Boavista	44	(0)
2018–2020	Feirense	24	(0)
2020–2023	Académico Viseu	84	(0)
2023–2026	Lusitânia	42	(1)
2026–	Paços Ferreira	1	(0)

International career
2009	Portugal U19	2	(0)
2010	Portugal U20	3	(0)
- * Club domestic league appearances and goals as of 10:58, 3 September 2026 (UTC)

Tiago Manuel Oliveira Mesquita (born 23 November 1990) is a Portuguese professional footballer who plays as a right-back for Liga 3 club Paços de Ferreira.

== Club career ==
Mesquita was born in Ribeirão, Vila Nova de Famalicão. After emerging through C.D. Trofense's youth academy, he made his professional debut with his hometown side G.D. Ribeirão in the 2007–08 season, in the third division.

In the summer of 2009, having appeared in only 16 matches with the main squad over the course of two seasons, Mesquita signed – not yet aged 19 – with Deportivo Alavés from Spain, playing in the Segunda División B. In his first year, he took part in less than half of the league matches as the Basques failed to regain their lost status of the previous campaign.

Mesquita returned to his country in the 2011 off-season, joining Associação Naval 1º de Maio of Segunda Liga. Two years later, he signed with his first club Trofense in the same tier, and split 2014–15 between the second and third divisions, with Ribeirão and S.C. Freamunde.

On 17 June 2015, Mesquita moved to Boavista FC. He made his Primeira Liga debut on 20 September, playing the full 90 minutes of a 2–0 away win against Académica de Coimbra. In June 2018, he joined C.D. Feirense in the same league on a two-year contract.

Mesquita represented Académico de Viseu FC (second tier) and Lusitânia FC (Liga 3). In the 2024–25 season, he helped the latter side to achieve a first-ever promotion to the professional leagues.

Mesquita returned to the third division ahead of the 2026–27 campaign, with the 35-year-old agreeing to a deal at F.C. Paços de Ferreira.
