= Leandro Silva (footballer, born 1995) =

Portuguese footballer

Personal information
- Full name: Leandro Xavier Marques Silva
- Date of birth: 27 July 1995 (age 31)
- Place of birth: Santa Maria da Feira, Portugal
- Height: 1.80 m (5 ft 11 in)
- Position: Right back

Team information
- Current team: Mafra
- Number: 26

Youth career
- 2003–2010: Feirense
- 2010–2013: Fiães
- 2013–2014: Sanjoanense

Senior career*
| Years | Team | Apps | (Gls) |
| 2014–2015 | Carregosense | 33 | (0) |
| 2015–2016 | Sanjoanense | 8 | (0) |
| 2016 | Gafanha | 8 | (0) |
| 2016–2017 | Lusitano VRSA | 31 | (2) |
| 2017 | Anadia | 13 | (2) |
| 2017–2019 | Felgueiras | 47 | (4) |
| 2019–2021 | Oliveirense | 47 | (0) |
| 2021– | Mafra | 2 | (0) |
- * Club domestic league appearances and goals as of 18 September 2021

Leandro Xavier Marques Silva (born 27 July 1995) is a Portuguese professional footballer who plays for Mafra as a defender.

== Football career ==
He made his Taça da Liga debut for Oliveirense on 3 August 2019 in a game against Rio Ave.

On 12 June 2021, he signed with Mafra.
