= Gonçalo Maria =

Portuguese footballer

Personal information
- Full name: Gonçalo Garcias das Neves Maria
- Date of birth: 18 January 1996 (age 30)
- Place of birth: Lisbon, Portugal
- Height: 1.77 m (5 ft 10 in)
- Position: Left-back

Team information
- Current team: Vitória Setúbal
- Number: 6

Youth career
- 2004–2006: Casa Pia
- 2006–2007: Sporting CP
- 2007–2011: Belenenses
- 2011–2013: Benfica
- 2013–2014: Oeiras
- 2014–2015: Benfica

Senior career*
Years	Team	Apps	(Gls)
2014	Oeiras	1	(1)
2015	Real Massamá	0	(0)
2015-2016	Sintra Football	1	(0)
2016–2017	1º de Dezembro	31	(1)
2017–2018	Cova da Piedade B		
2018–2021	Cova da Piedade	14	(0)
2019–2020	→ Loures (loan)	23	(0)
2021	Estrela da Amadora	3	(0)
2021–2023	Belenenses	43	(5)
2023–	Vitória Setúbal	27	(1)

International career
2012	Portugal U16	2	(1)
- * Club domestic league appearances and goals as of 20:02, 8 June 2024 (UTC)

Gonçalo Garcias das Neves Maria (born 18 January 1996) is a Portuguese professional footballer who plays for Vitória Setúbal as a left-back.

== Football career ==
On 26 August 2018, Maria made his professional debut with Cova da Piedade in a 2018–19 LigaPro match against Oliveirense.
