= Alan Júnior =

Brazilian footballer (born 1993)

Personal information
- Full name: Alan Júnior Martins de Oliveira
- Date of birth: 10 April 1993 (age 33)
- Place of birth: Assis, Brazil
- Height: 1.83 m (6 ft 0 in)
- Position: Forward

Team information
- Current team: São João Ver
- Number: 19

Youth career
- 2010: Prudentópolis
- 2011: Coritiba
- 2011–2012: Sporting Braga

Senior career*
| Years | Team | Apps | (Gls) |
| 2012–2015 | Braga B | 9 | (1) |
| 2014–2015 | → Lusitânia Lourosa (loan) | 31 | (8) |
| 2015–2017 | Fafe | 70 | (29) |
| 2017–2019 | Benfica B | 18 | (3) |
| 2018 | → Académica (loan) | 12 | (1) |
| 2018–2019 | → Farense (loan) | 14 | (1) |
| 2019–2020 | Leixões | 2 | (0) |
| 2020 | → Trofense (loan) | 4 | (1) |
| 2020–2021 | Trofense | 24 | (5) |
| 2021–2022 | Sanjoanense | 4 | (0) |
| 2022– | São João Ver | 9 | (0) |
- * Club domestic league appearances and goals as of 01:48, 14 April 2022 (UTC)

Alan Júnior Martins de Oliveira (born 10 April 1993), simply known as Alan Júnior, is a Brazilian professional footballer who plays for Portuguese club São João Ver as a forward.

== Club career ==
On 3 February 2013, Alan Júnior made his professional debut with Braga B in a 2012–13 Segunda Liga match against Tondela.

On 6 June 2017, Alan Júnior signed a five-season deal with Portuguese champions Benfica, being assigned to its reserve team.
