= 2022–23 S.C. Braga season =

S.C. Braga
2022–23 season
- President: António Salvador
- Head coach: Artur Jorge
- Stadium: Estádio Municipal de Braga
- Primeira Liga: 3rd
- Taça de Portugal: Runners-up
- Taça da Liga: Quarter-finals
- UEFA Europa League: Group stage
- UEFA Europa Conference League: Knockout round play-offs
- Top goalscorer: League: Ricardo Horta (14); All: Ricardo Horta (17)
Home colours	Away colours	Third colours

The 2022-23 season was the 102nd season in the history of S.C. Braga and their 27th consecutive season in the top flight. The club participated in Primeira Liga, Taça de Portugal, Taça da Liga, UEFA Europa League and UEFA Europa Conference League.

== Players ==
As of 2 February 2023

Note: Flags indicate national team as defined under FIFA eligibility rules; some limited exceptions apply. Players may hold more than one non-FIFA nationality.

No.	Pos.	Nation	Player
1	GK	BRA	Matheus (vice-captain)
2	DF	ESP	Víctor Gómez (on loan from Espanyol)
3	DF	BRA	Vítor Tormena
4	DF	FRA	Sikou Niakaté (on loan from Guingamp)
5	DF	TUR	Serdar Saatçı
6	DF	POR	Nuno Sequeira
7	FW	POR	Rodrigo Gomes
8	MF	LBA	Al-Musrati
9	FW	ESP	Abel Ruiz
10	MF	POR	André Horta
11	FW	POR	Roger Fernandes
12	GK	POR	Tiago Sá

No.	Pos.	Nation	Player
14	FW	ESP	Álvaro Djaló
15	DF	POR	Paulo Oliveira
17	DF	SWE	Joe Mendes
19	MF	SRB	Uroš Račić (on loan from Valencia)
21	FW	POR	Ricardo Horta (captain)
22	MF	POR	Pizzi
23	FW	FRA	Simon Banza
26	DF	COL	Cristian Borja
27	FW	POR	Bruma (on loan from Fenerbahçe)
29	MF	FRA	Jean-Baptiste Gorby
45	MF	POR	Iuri Medeiros
88	MF	POR	André Castro

=== Out on loan ===
Note: Flags indicate national team as defined under FIFA eligibility rules; some limited exceptions apply. Players may hold more than one non-FIFA nationality.

No.	Pos.	Nation	Player
13	DF	POR	Tiago Esgaio (at Arouca until 30 June 2023)
16	MF	POR	Eduardo Schürrle (at Trofense until 30 June 2023)
24	DF	POR	Bruno Rodrigues (at Fatih Karagümrük until 30 June 2023)
25	MF	BRA	Lucas Mineiro (at Westerlo until 30 June 2023)
74	DF	POR	Francisco Moura (at Famalicão until 30 June 2023)
95	FW	BRA	Guilherme Schettine (at Grasshoppers until 30 June 2023)

No.	Pos.	Nation	Player
—	DF	BRA	Fabiano (at Kasımpaşa until 30 June 2023)
—	DF	POR	Zé Carlos (at Gil Vicente until 30 June 2023)
—	MF	BRA	Lucas Piazon (at Botafogo until 30 June 2023)
—	FW	ESP	Mario González (at OH Leuven until 30 June 2023)
—	FW	GBS	Hernâni Infande (at Paços de Ferreira until 30 June 2023)

== Pre-season and friendlies ==
Win Draw Loss Fixtures

6 July 2022 Friendly	Oliveirense	2–6	Braga	Oliveira de Azeméis
11:00 WEST (UTC+1)	João Marcelo 37'; Jaiminho 64' (pen.)	Report	Vasco Gadelho 22' (o.g.); Schürrle 24'; Dinis Rodrigues 44'; Vitinha 61', 77', 88'	Stadium: Estádio Carlos Osório

9 July 2022 Friendly	Vizela	2–3	Braga	Apúlia e Fão
10:00 WEST (UTC+1)	Cunha 2'; Bondoso 36'	Report	Ruiz 49'; Moura 55'; Schürrle 81' (pen.)	Stadium: Centro Desportivo de Fão

12 July 2022 Friendly	Arouca	2–3	Braga	Apúlia e Fão
18:00 WEST (UTC+1)				Stadium: Centro Desportivo de Fão

15 July 2022 Friendly	Braga	3–0	Middlesbrough	Lagos
19:00 WEST (UTC+1)	Medeiros 11'; A. Horta 48' (pen.), 50'			Stadium: Estádio Municipal Fernando Cabrita

23 July 2022 Friendly	Portimonense	2–0	Braga	Portimão
09:30 WEST (UTC+1)	Sá 25'; Aponzá 41'			Stadium: Estádio Dois Irmãos; Referee: André Filipe

29 July 2022 Friendly	Braga	2–1	Celta Vigo	Braga, Portugal
20:00 WEST (UTC+1)	Banza 22'; Gomes 85'		Aspas 49'	Stadium: Estádio Municipal de Braga; Referee: Carlos Macedo

== Competitions ==
=== Overall record ===
Competition	First match	Last match	Starting round	Final position	Record							
Competition	First match	Last match	Starting round	Final position	Pld	W	D	L	GF	GA	GD	Win %
Primeira Liga	7 August 2022	27 May 2023	Matchday 1	3rd	34	25	3	6	75	30	+45	73.53
Taça de Portugal	16 October 2022	4 June 2023	Third round	Runners-up	7	4	2	1	15	9	+6	57.14
Taça da Liga	26 November 2022	19 December 2022	Group stage	Quarter-finals	4	3	0	1	6	5	+1	75.00
UEFA Europa League	8 September 2022	3 November 2022	Group stage	Group stage	6	3	1	2	9	7	+2	50.00
UEFA Europa Conference League	16 February 2023	23 February 2023	Knockout round play-offs	Knockout round play-offs	2	0	0	2	2	7	−5	0.00
Total					53	35	6	12	107	58	+49	66.04

Source: Liga Portugal

=== Primeira Liga ===
==== League table ====
Pos	Team	Pld	W	D	L	GF	GA	GD	Pts	Qualification or relegation
1	Benfica (C)	34	28	3	3	82	20	+62	87	Qualification for the Champions League group stage
2	Porto	34	27	4	3	73	22	+51	85	Qualification for the Champions League group stage
3	Braga	34	25	3	6	75	30	+45	78	Qualification for the Champions League third qualifying round
4	Sporting CP	34	23	5	6	71	32	+39	74	Qualification for the Europa League group stage
5	Arouca	34	15	9	10	36	37	−1	54	Qualification for the Europa Conference League third qualifying round

Source: Liga Portugal
Rules for classification: 1) Points; 2) Head-to-head points; 3) Head-to-head goal difference; 4) Goal difference; 5) Matches won; 6) Goals scored; 7) Play-off.
(C) Champions

==== Results summary ====
Overall								Home						Away					
Pld	W	D	L	GF	GA	GD	Pts	W	D	L	GF	GA	GD	W	D	L	GF	GA	GD
34	25	3	6	75	30	+45	78	13	2	2	40	11	+29	12	1	4	35	19	+16

Source: Liga Portugal

==== Results by round ====
Round	1	2	3	4	5	6	7	8	9	10	11	12	13	14	15	16	17	18	19	20	21	22	23	24	25	26	27	28	29	30	31	32	33	34
Ground	H	A	H	A	H	A	H	A	H	A	A	H	A	H	A	H	A	A	H	A	H	A	H	A	H	A	H	H	A	H	A	H	A	H
Result	D	W	W	W	W	W	W	L	L	W	W	L	W	W	W	W	W	L	W	W	W	L	W	W	D	W	W	W	W	W	L	W	D	W
Position	8	5	3	2	2	2	2	3	3	3	2	3	3	3	2	2	2	3	3	3	3	3	3	3	3	3	3	3	3	3	3	3	3	3

Source: Liga Portugal
A = Away; H = Home; W = Win; D = Draw; L = Loss

==== Matches ====
The league fixtures were announced on 5 July 2022.

7 August 2022 1	Braga	3–3	Sporting CP	Braga
18:00 WEST (UTC+1)	Banza 14'; Niakaté 45+1'; Ruiz 88'	Report	Gonçalves 9'; Santos 18'; Edwards 83'	Stadium: Estádio Municipal de Braga; Attendance: 17,714; Referee: Fábio Veríssimo

12 August 2022 2	Famalicão	0–3	Braga	Vila Nova de Famalicão
20:15 WEST (UTC+1)		Report	Sequeira 14'; Banza 19', 79'	Stadium: Estádio António Coimbra da Mota; Attendance: 4,637; Referee: Luís Godinho

21 August 2022 3	Braga	5–0	Marítimo	Braga
18:00 WEST (UTC+1)	Vitinha 9'; Medeiros 42'; Banza 57'; Ruiz 65'; Gomes 88'	Report		Stadium: Estádio Municipal de Braga; Attendance: 12,358; Referee: António Nobre

28 August 2022 4	Arouca	0–6	Braga	Arouca
18:00 WEST (UTC+1)		Report	Banza 1'; R. Horta 4', 40'; Vitinha 44'; Castro 67'; Lainez 77'	Stadium: Estádio Municipal de Arouca; Attendance: 2,348; Referee: Gustavo Correia

3 September 2022 5	Braga	1–0	Vitória de Guimarães	Braga
15:30 WEST (UTC+1)	Tormena 90+7'	Report		Stadium: Estádio Municipal de Braga; Attendance: 21,736; Referee: Nuno Almeida

11 September 2022 6	Rio Ave	2–3	Braga	Vila do Conde
20:30 WEST (UTC+1)	Boateng 81'; Aziz 87'	Report	Al-Musrati 11'; Medeiros 25'; R. Horta 69'	Stadium: Estádio dos Arcos; Attendance: 3,071; Referee: Luís Godinho

18 September 2022 7	Braga	2–0	Vizela	Braga
20:30 WEST (UTC+1)	Vitinha 82'; R. Horta 90+4'	Report		Stadium: Estádio Municipal de Braga; Attendance: 14,181; Referee: André Narciso

30 September 2022 8	Porto	4–1	Braga	Porto
21:15 WEST (UTC+1)	Evanilson 32'; Eustáquio 34'; Pepê 63'; Galeno 90+6'	Report	Pepe 55' (o.g.)	Stadium: Estádio do Dragão; Attendance: 44,830; Referee: Artur Soares Dias

9 October 2022 9	Braga	0–1	Chaves	Braga
20:30 WEST (UTC+1)		Report	Héctor 2'	Stadium: Estádio Municipal de Braga; Attendance: 12,494; Referee: Claúdio Pereira

22 October 2022 10	Estoril	0–2	Braga	Estoril
18:00 WEST (UTC+1)		Report	Al-Musrati 10'; Vitinha 30'	Stadium: Estádio António Coimbra da Mota; Attendance: 2,674; Referee: André Narciso

30 October 2022 11	Gil Vicente	0–1	Braga	Barcelos
20:30 WEST (UTC+1)		Report	Medeiros 67'	Stadium: Estádio Cidade de Barcelos; Attendance: 5,627; Referee: João Pinheiro

6 November 2022 12	Braga	0–1	Casa Pia	Braga
18:00 WEST (UTC+1)	Medeiros (yellow card) 45+8'; Tormena (yellow card) 83'	Report	Martins 23'; Eteki (yellow card) 59'; Bolgado (yellow card) 72'; Cuca (yellow card) 90+3'	Stadium: Estádio Municipal de Braga; Attendance: 13,004; Referee: Luis Godinho

13 November 2022 13	Portimonense	1–2	Braga	Portimão
18:00 WEST (UTC+1)	Ouattara 40'; Cariello (yellow card) 44'; Nakamura (yellow card) 87'	Report	Medeiros 65' (pen.); Oliveira (yellow card) 76' (yellow-red card) 90+10'; Vitinha 83'; Djaló (yellow card) 87'; Tormena (yellow card) 90+9', (red card) 90+9'	Stadium: Estádio Municipal de Portimão; Attendance: 1,290; Referee: Tiago Martins

30 December 2022 14	Braga	3–0	Benfica	Braga
21:15 WEST (UTC+1)	Ruiz 2'; R. Horta 32', 70'	Report		Stadium: Estádio Municipal de Braga; Attendance: 19,398; Referee: João Pinheiro

8 January 2022 15	Santa Clara	0–4	Braga	Ponta Delgada
19:15 WEST (UTC+1)		Report	R. Horta 14', 80'; Iuri Medeiros 16'; A. Horta 53'	Stadium: Estádio de São Miguel; Attendance: 1,591; Referee: Miguel Nogueira

14 January 2022 16	Braga	1–0	Boavista	Braga
20:30 WEST (UTC+1)	Vitinha 46'	Report		Stadium: Estádio Municipal de Braga; Attendance: 12,357; Referee: André Narciso

21 January 2023 17	Paços de Ferreira	v	Braga	Paços de Ferreira
15:30 WEST (UTC+1)				Stadium: Estádio da Mata Real

=== Taça de Portugal ===
16 October 2022 Third round	Felgueiras 1932	1–2	Braga	Felgueiras
17:00 WEST (UTC+01:00)	Rodrigues 64'	Report	Rodrigues 61'; Oliveira 89'	Stadium: Estádio Dr. Machado de Matos; Referee: João Gonçalves

10 November 2022 Fourth round	Braga	2–1	Moreirense	Braga
19:45 WET (UTC±00:00)	R. Horta 15'; Castro (yellow card) 31'; Oliveira (yellow card) 67'; Lainez 88'; Fabiano (yellow card) 90+2'; Ruiz (yellow card) 90+4'	Report	Platiny 27'; Pasinato (yellow card) 69'; Amador (yellow card) 82'	Stadium: Estádio Municipal de Braga; Referee: Artur Soares Dias

11 January 2023 Fifth round	Braga	3–2	Vitória de Guimarães	Braga
18:45 WET (UTC±00:00)	Ruiz 81', 85'; Vitinha 82'	Report	Jota 16'; Anderson 45+6'	Stadium: Estádio Municipal de Braga; Referee: Artur Soares Dias

9 February 2023 Quarter-finals	Braga	1–1 (a.e.t.) (5–4 p)	Benfica	Braga
20:30 WET (UTC±00:00)	Al-Musrati 36'; Račić (yellow card) 55'; Castro (yellow card) 88'; Niakaté (yellow card) 92'; Tormena (yellow card) 100'; Oliveira (yellow card) 106'; Banza (yellow card) 112'	Report	Guedes 15'; Bah (red card) 31'; Otamendi (yellow card) 83'; Vlachodimos (yellow card) 111'; Morato (yellow card) 115' (yellow-red card) 120'	Stadium: Estádio Municipal de Braga; Referee: Tiago Martins
	Penalties
	R. Horta (penalty scored); Djaló (penalty scored); Castro (penalty scored); Oliveira (penalty scored); Al-Musrati (penalty scored)		(penalty scored) João Mário; (penalty scored) Otamendi; (penalty scored) A. Silva; (penalty missed) Aursnes; (penalty scored) Grimaldo

=== Taça da Liga ===
==== Third round ====
Pos	Team	Pld	W	D	L	GF	GA	GD	Pts	Qualification
1	Braga	3	3	0	0	6	0	+6	9	Advance to knockout phase
2	Casa Pia	3	1	1	1	2	2	0	4	
3	Paços de Ferreira	3	0	2	1	2	4	−2	2	
4	Trofense	3	0	1	2	1	5	−4	1	

Source: Liga Portugal
Rules for classification: Tiebreakers

26 November 2022 1	Braga	3–0	Trofense	Braga
18:45 WEST (UTC+1)	Banza 16'; Niakaté (yellow card) 39'; Al-Musrati 42'; Lainez (yellow card) 64'; Hernâni Infande 90+4'	Report	Okitokandjo (yellow card) 45+2'	Stadium: Estádio Municipal de Braga; Referee: Ricardo Baixinho

3 December 2022 2	Casa Pia	0–1	Braga	Lisbon
17:00 WEST (UTC+1)		Report	Vitinha 23'	Stadium: Estádio Pina Manique; Attendance: 763; Referee: Fábio Veríssimo

11 December 2022 3	Braga	2–0	Paços de Ferreira	Braga
19:00 WEST (UTC+1)	Djaló 42'; Ruiz 45'	Report		Stadium: Estádio Municipal de Braga; Attendance: 4,998; Referee: Rui Costa (referee)

==== Quarter-finals ====
19 December 2022	Sporting CP	5–0	Braga	Lisbon
20:15 WEST (UTC+1)	Inácio 4'; Paulinho 7'; Gonçalves 20' (pen.); Trincão 41'; Edwards 45+4' (pen.)	Report		Stadium: Estádio José Alvalade; Attendance: 20,396; Referee: Luís Godinho

=== UEFA Europa League ===
==== Group stage ====
The draw for the group stage was held on 26 August 2022.

Pos	Team	Pld	W	D	L	GF	GA	GD	Pts	Qualification	USG	UBE	BRA	MAL
1	(Belgium) Union Saint-Gilloise	6	4	1	1	11	7	+4	13	Advance to round of 16	—	0–1	3–3	3–2
2	(Germany) Union Berlin	6	4	0	2	4	2	+2	12	Advance to knockout round play-offs	0–1	—	1–0	1–0
3	(Portugal) Braga	6	3	1	2	9	7	+2	10	Transfer to Europa Conference League	1–2	1–0	—	2–1
4	(Sweden) Malmö FF	6	0	0	6	3	11	−8	0		0–2	0–1	0–2	—

Source: UEFA
Rules for classification: Group stage tiebreakers

8 September 2022 1	Malmö FF (Sweden)	0–2	(Portugal) Braga	Malmö, Sweden
12:45 CEST (UTC+2)	Rakip (yellow card) 12'; Olsson (yellow card) 78'; Turay (yellow card) 80'; Moisander (yellow card) 84'; Knudsen (yellow card) 90+7'	Report	Rodrigues 30'; Vitinha (yellow card) 57'; R. Horta 70' (pen.); Sequeira (yellow card) 85'	Stadium: Eleda Stadion; Attendance: 13,721; Referee: Duje Strukan (Croatia)

18 September 2022 2	Braga (Portugal)	1–0	(Germany) Union Berlin	Braga, Portugal
20:30 WEST (UTC+1)	Banza (yellow card) 45+3'; A. Horta (yellow card) 70'; Vitinha 77'	Report	Schäfer (yellow card) 27'; Behrens (yellow card) 90'; Ryerson (yellow card) 90+6'	Stadium: Estádio Municipal de Braga; Attendance: 17,782; Referee: Filip Glova (Slovakia)

6 October 2022 3	Braga (Portugal)	1–2	(Belgium) Union Saint-Gilloise	Braga, Portugal
15:00 CEST (UTC+2)	Tormena (yellow card) 23'; Ruiz 49'; Fabiano (yellow card) 62'	Report	Teuma (yellow card) 17'; Nilsson 86', 90+4'; Moris (yellow card) 51'	Stadium: Estádio Municipal de Braga; Attendance: 14,044; Referee: Stéphanie Frappart (France)

13 October 2022 4	Union Saint-Gilloise (Belgium)	3–3	(Portugal) Braga	Leuven, Belgium
12:45 CEST (UTC+2)	Boniface 20', 62'; Lazare Amani (yellow card) 45'; Vanzeir 49'; Lynen (yellow card) 86'		Vitinha 15', 36', 41'; Fabiano (yellow card) 25'; Niakaté (yellow card) 71'	Stadium: Den Dreef; Attendance: 7,851; Referee: Aliyar Aghayev (Azerbaijan)
Note: Union Saint-Gilloise played their home match at Den Dreef in Leuven, instead of their regular stadium, the Joseph Marien Stadium, in Brussels, which did not meet UEFA requirements.

27 October 2022 5	Union Berlin (Germany)	1–0	(Portugal) Braga	Berlin, Germany
12:45 CEST (UTC+2)	Thorsby (yellow card) 33'; Knoche 68' (pen.); Ryerson (yellow card) 72'; Rønnow (yellow card) 90+1'	Report	Fabiano (yellow card) 39'; Ruiz (yellow card) 45+2'; Castro (yellow card) 47'; A. Horta (yellow card) 90+6'	Stadium: Stadion An der Alten Försterei; Attendance: 21,082; Referee: Craig Pawson (England)

3 November 2022 6	Braga (Portugal)	2–1	(Sweden) Malmö FF	Braga, Portugal
16:00 CEST (UTC+2)	R. Horta 36'; Oliveira (yellow card) 48'; Djaló 55'; Infande (yellow card) 90+6'	Report	Chaluš (yellow card) 58'; Sejdiu 77'	Stadium: Estádio Municipal de Braga; Attendance: 11,805; Referee: Ruddy Buquet (France)

==== Knockout phase ====
===== Knockout round play-offs =====
The knockout round play-offs draw was held on 7 November 2022.

16 February 2023 First leg	Braga (Portugal)	0–4	(Italy) Fiorentina	Braga, Portugal
17:45 WET (UTC±0)	Tormena (red card) 55'	Report	Jović 45+1', 60'; Venuti (yellow card) 50'; Cabral 79', 90'; Kouamé (yellow card) 86'; Ikoné (yellow card) 89'	Stadium: Estádio Municipal; Attendance: 13,041; Referee: Carlos del Cerro Grande (Spain)

23 February 2023 Second leg	Fiorentina (Italy)	3–2 (7–2 agg.)	(Portugal) Braga	Florence, Italy
21:00 CET (UTC+1)	Mandragora 37'; Dodô (yellow card) 39'; González (yellow card) 56'; Saponara 58'; Martínez Quarta (yellow card) 70'; Biraghi (yellow card) 70'; Cabral 83'	Report	Castro 16'; Djaló 34'	Stadium: Stadio Artemio Franchi; Attendance: 13,603; Referee: Benoît Bastien (France)

== Statistics ==
=== Squad appearances and goals ===
As of 27 May 2023

No.	Pos	Nat	Player	Total		Primeira Liga		Taça de Portugal		Taça da Liga		UEFA Europa League		UEFA Conference League	
No.	Pos	Nat	Player	Apps	Goals	Apps	Goals	Apps	Goals	Apps	Goals	Apps	Goals	Apps	Goals
Goalkeepers
1	GK	(Brazil) BRA	Matheus	45	0	32	0	4	0	2	0	6	0	1	0
12	GK	(Portugal) POR	Tiago Sá	8	0	2+1	0	3	0	1	0	0	0	1	0
91	GK	(Czech Republic) CZE	Lukáš Horníček	2	0	0+1	0	0	0	1	0	0	0	0	0
Defenders
2	DF	(Spain) ESP	Víctor Gómez	39	0	23+3	0	5+1	0	2+2	0	1+1	0	1	0
3	DF	(Brazil) BRA	Vítor Tormena	40	1	26+1	1	3+2	0	2	0	5	0	1	0
4	DF	(France) FRA	Sikou Niakaté	34	3	25+1	3	3	0	2	0	1	0	2	0
5	DF	(Turkey) TUR	Serdar Saatçı	6	0	2+1	0	1	0	0+1	0	0	0	0+1	0
6	DF	(Portugal) POR	Nuno Sequeira	39	1	24+3	1	3	0	2	0	6	0	1	0
15	DF	(Portugal) POR	Paulo Oliveira	35	1	15+5	0	5+1	1	2	0	5+1	0	1	0
17	DF	(Sweden) SWE	Joe Mendes	10	1	4+2	1	1+2	0	0	0	0	0	1	0
26	DF	(Colombia) COL	Cristian Borja	23	0	8+6	0	3+1	0	2	0	0+2	0	1	0
42	DF	(Portugal) POR	Guilherme Soares	0	0	0	0	0	0	0	0	0	0	0	0
76	DF	(Portugal) POR	Dinis Pinto	1	0	0+1	0	0	0	0	0	0	0	0	0
Midfielders
8	MF	(Libya) LBA	Al-Musrati	41	5	28	3	4	1	3	1	5	0	1	0
10	MF	(Portugal) POR	André Horta	50	1	27+5	1	5+2	0	2+2	0	2+3	0	2	0
19	MF	(Serbia) SRB	Uroš Račić	35	4	12+13	1	4+2	3	0	0	1+1	0	1+1	0
22	MF	(Portugal) POR	Pizzi	26	3	3+13	2	3+1	1	0	0	2+3	0	1	0
29	MF	(France) FRA	Jean-Baptiste Gorby	13	0	0+7	0	1+2	0	1+1	0	0+1	0	0	0
41	MF	(Mexico) MEX	Eugenio Pizzuto	0	0	0	0	0	0	0	0	0	0	0	0
45	MF	(Portugal) POR	Iuri Medeiros	43	10	29+1	10	6+1	0	2	0	1+2	0	1	0
88	MF	(Portugal) POR	André Castro	39	2	3+21	1	2+3	0	2+1	0	3+2	0	1+1	1
89	MF	(Portugal) POR	Pedro Santos	4	0	0+3	0	0	0	0+1	0	0	0	0	0
Forwards
7	FW	(Portugal) POR	Rodrigo Gomes	27	2	1+14	1	1+2	1	0+3	0	2+3	0	1	0
9	FW	(Spain) ESP	Abel Ruiz	51	12	26+8	8	3+2	2	2+2	1	5+1	1	1+1	0
11	FW	(Portugal) POR	Roger Fernandes	1	0	0	0	0	0	0+1	0	0	0	0	0
14	FW	(Spain) ESP	Álvaro Djaló	40	5	1+22	2	2+5	0	1+2	1	1+4	1	1+1	1
21	FW	(Portugal) POR	Ricardo Horta	45	17	30	14	5+1	1	1	0	6	2	1+1	0
23	FW	(France) FRA	Simon Banza	47	14	15+15	11	3+4	2	3	1	2+3	0	1+1	0
27	FW	(Portugal) POR	Bruma	21	4	13+3	4	1+2	0	0	0	0	0	0+2	0
92	FW	(Portugal) POR	Rodrigo Macedo	1	0	0	0	0	0	0+1	0	0	0	0	0
96	FW	(Portugal) POR	Miguel Falé	0	0	0	0	0	0	0	0	0	0	0	0
Players who have made an appearance this season but have left the club
24	DF	(Portugal) POR	Bruno Rodrigues	7	1	1	0	2	0	2+1	0	1	1	0	0
70	DF	(Brazil) BRA	Fabiano	21	5	11+1	0	2	0	2	5	5	0	0	0
18	MF	(Mexico) MEX	Diego Lainez	13	2	1+5	1	0+1	1	3	0	1+2	0	0	0
71	FW	(Guinea-Bissau) GBS	Hernâni Infande	8	1	1+2	0	0	0	2+2	1	0+1	0	0	0
99	FW	(Portugal) POR	Vitinha	27	13	12+5	7	2+1	1	2	1	5	4	0	0
