= 2021–22 S.C. Braga season =

S.C. Braga
2021–22 season
- President: António Salvador
- Head coach: Carlos Carvalhal
- Stadium: Estádio Municipal de Braga
- Primeira Liga: 4th
- Taça de Portugal: Fifth round
- Taça da Liga: Third round
- Supertaça Cândido de Oliveira: Runners-up
- UEFA Europa League: Quarter-finals
- Top goalscorer: League: Ricardo Horta (19); All: Ricardo Horta (23)
Home colours	Away colours	Third colours

The 2021–22 season was the 101st season in the existence of S.C. Braga and the club's 26th consecutive season in the top flight of Portuguese football. In addition to the domestic league, Braga participated in this season's editions of the Taça de Portugal, the Taça da Liga, the Supertaça Cândido de Oliveira and the UEFA Europa League.

== Players ==
=== First-team squad ===
As of 11 March 2022

Note: Flags indicate national team as defined under FIFA eligibility rules; some limited exceptions apply. Players may hold more than one non-FIFA nationality.

No.	Pos.	Nation	Player
1	GK	BRA	Matheus
2	DF	BRA	Yan Couto (on loan from Manchester City)
3	DF	BRA	Vítor Tormena
4	DF	POR	Diogo Leite (on loan from Porto)
5	DF	POR	Nuno Sequeira
6	DF	POR	Rolando
8	MF	LBA	Al-Musrati
9	FW	ESP	Abel Ruiz
10	MF	POR	André Horta
12	GK	POR	Tiago Sá
15	DF	POR	Paulo Oliveira
16	DF	POR	David Carmo
21	FW	POR	Ricardo Horta (captain)
25	MF	BRA	Lucas Mineiro
41	MF	MEX	Eugenio Pizzuto
42	DF	POR	Guilherme Soares

No.	Pos.	Nation	Player
45	MF	POR	Iuri Medeiros
50	DF	POR	Leonardo Buta
56	MF	POR	Eduardo Schürrle
57	FW	POR	Rodrigo Gomes
67	MF	FRA	Jean-Baptiste Gorby
70	DF	BRA	Fabiano Souza
71	FW	GBS	Hernâni Infande
74	DF	POR	Francisco Moura
76	DF	POR	Dinis Pinto
78	FW	GBS	Roger Fernandes
86	DF	POR	Bruno Rodrigues
88	MF	POR	André Castro
91	GK	CZE	Lukáš Horníček
96	FW	POR	Miguel Falé
99	FW	POR	Vitinha

=== Others players under contract ===
Note: Flags indicate national team as defined under FIFA eligibility rules; some limited exceptions apply. Players may hold more than one non-FIFA nationality.

No.	Pos.	Nation	Player
—	DF	POR	Marco Torres

=== Out on loan ===
Note: Flags indicate national team as defined under FIFA eligibility rules; some limited exceptions apply. Players may hold more than one non-FIFA nationality.

No.	Pos.	Nation	Player
7	MF	POR	João Novais (at Alanyaspor until 30 June 2022)
11	MF	BRA	Lucas Piazon (at Botafogo until 30 June 2023)
13	DF	POR	Tiago Esgaio (at Arouca until 30 June 2022)
34	DF	BRA	Raul Silva (at Estoril until 30 June 2022)
36	DF	BRA	Bruno Viana (at Khimki until 30 June 2022)
95	FW	BRA	Guilherme Schettine (at Vizela until 30 June 2022)

No.	Pos.	Nation	Player
—	DF	BRA	Caju (at Aris Limassol until 31 May 2022)
—	DF	BRA	Pablo Renan (at Moreirense until 30 June 2022)
—	DF	COL	Cristian Borja (at Alanyaspor until 30 June 2022)
—	DF	POR	Zé Carlos (at Gil Vicente until 30 June 2022)

== Pre-season and friendlies ==
Win Draw Loss Fixtures

6 July 2021 Friendly	Vizela	3–4	Braga	Apúlia e Fão, Portugal
17:00 WEST (UTC+1)	Cassiano 13'; Vilela 42'; Bondoso 51'		R. Horta 23', 27', 33'; González 84'	Stadium: Sports Complex Football Club Fão

8 July 2021 Friendly	Braga	1–0	Trofense	Apúlia e Fão, Portugal
11:00 WEST (UTC+1)	González 71'			Stadium: Sports Complex Football Club Fão

9 July 2021 Friendly	SønderjyskE	Cancelled	Braga	Apúlia e Fão, Portugal
19:00 WEST (UTC+1)				Stadium: Sports Complex Football Club Fão

10 July 2021 Friendly	Moreirense	0–4	Braga	Apúlia e Fão, Portugal
10:00 WEST (UTC+1)			Fernandes 25'; R. Horta 62' (pen.), 83'; Piazón 70'	Stadium: Sports Complex Football Club Fão

13 July 2021 Friendly	Estrela	0–0	Braga	Albufeira, Portugal
20:00 WEST (UTC+1)		Report		Stadium: Estádio Municipal de Albufeira

16 July 2021 Friendly	Farense	0–0	Braga	Faro, Portugal
20:00 WEST (UTC+1)		Report		Stadium: Estádio de São Luís

17 July 2021 Friendly	Portimonense	1–1	Braga	Braga, Portugal
10:00 WEST (UTC+1)	Fabrício 21' (pen.)	Report	Ruiz 2'	Stadium: Estádio Municipal de Braga

21 July 2021 Friendly	Braga	1–1	Marseille	Braga, Portugal
20:00 WEST (UTC+1)	Ruiz 19'	Report	Payet 52'	Stadium: Estádio Municipal de Braga

24 July 2021 Friendly	Braga	2–1	Paços de Ferreira	Braga, Portugal
20:00 WEST (UTC+1)	Ruiz 53'; González 86'	Report	Silva 58'	Stadium: Estádio Municipal de Braga

3 September 2021 Friendly	Villarreal	2–3	Braga	Villarreal, Spain
20:00 CEST (UTC+2)	Gómez 51'; Raba 55'	Report	Oliveira 8'; Galeno 25'; Fabiano (red card) 32'; Medeiros 72'	Stadium: Estadio de la Cerámica

== Competitions ==
=== Overall record ===
Competition	First match	Last match	Starting round	Final position	Record							
Competition	First match	Last match	Starting round	Final position	Pld	W	D	L	GF	GA	GD	Win %
Primeira Liga	7 August 2021	15 May 2022	Matchday 1	4th	34	19	8	7	52	31	+21	55.88
Taça de Portugal	17 October 2021	23 December 2021	Third round	Fifth round	3	2	0	1	11	1	+10	66.67
Taça da Liga	28 October 2021	16 December 2021	Third round	Third round	2	0	1	1	1	5	−4	0.00
Supertaça Cândido de Oliveira	31 July 2021		Final	Runners-up	1	0	0	1	1	2	−1	0.00
UEFA Europa League	16 September 2021	14 April 2022	Group stage	Quarter-finals	12	6	2	4	18	15	+3	50.00
Total					52	27	11	14	83	54	+29	51.92

Last updated: 15 May 2022
Source: Soccerway

=== Primeira Liga ===
==== League table ====
Pos	Team	Pld	W	D	L	GF	GA	GD	Pts	Qualification or relegation
2	Sporting CP	34	27	4	3	73	23	+50	85	Qualification for the Champions League group stage
3	Benfica	34	23	5	6	78	30	+48	74	Qualification for the Champions League third qualifying round
4	Braga	34	19	8	7	52	31	+21	65	Qualification for the Europa League group stage (Note: Since the winners of the 2021–22 Taça de Portugal, Porto, qualified for the Champions League based on league position, the spot awarded to the fourth-placed team (Europa Conference League third qualifying round) was passed to the fifth-placed team, and the spot awarded to the fifth-placed team (Europa Conference League second qualifying round) was passed to the sixth-placed team.)
5	Gil Vicente	34	13	12	9	47	42	+5	51	Qualification for the Europa Conference League third qualifying round
6	Vitória de Guimarães	34	13	9	12	50	41	+9	48	Qualification for the Europa Conference League second qualifying round

Source: Liga Portugal
Rules for classification: 1) Points; 2) Head-to-head points; 3) Head-to-head goal difference; 4) Head-to-head away goals scored; 5) Goal difference; 6) Matches won; 7) Goals scored; 8) Play-off.

==== Results summary ====
Overall								Home						Away					
Pld	W	D	L	GF	GA	GD	Pts	W	D	L	GF	GA	GD	W	D	L	GF	GA	GD
34	19	8	7	52	31	+21	65	10	4	3	27	13	+14	9	4	4	25	18	+7

Last updated: 15 May 2022.
Source: Liga Portugal

==== Results by round ====
Round	1	2	3	4	5	6	7	8	9	10	11	12	13	14	15	16	17	18	19	20	21	22	23	24	25	26	27	28	29	30	31	32	33	34
Ground	A	H	A	H	A	H	A	H	A	H	A	H	H	A	H	A	H	H	A	H	A	H	A	H	A	H	A	H	A	A	H	A	H	A
Result	W	L	W	D	D	W	D	D	W	W	L	W	W	L	W	W	D	L	W	W	L	W	W	D	D	L	W	W	W	D	W	W	W	L
Position	4	7	6	6	6	5	5	6	5	4	5	4	4	4	4	4	4	4	4	4	4	4	4	4	4	4	4	4	4	4	4	4	4	4

Updated to match(es) played on 15 May 2022. Source: Liga Portugal
A = Away; H = Home; W = Win; D = Draw; L = Loss

==== Matches ====
7 August 2021 1	Marítimo	0–2	Braga	Funchal
20:30 WEST (UTC+1)		Report	Silva 60'; Horta 68'	Stadium: Estádio do Marítimo; Attendance: 1,782; Referee: André Narciso

14 August 2021 2	Braga	1–2	Sporting CP	Braga
20:30 WEST (UTC+1)	Ruiz 90+2'	Report	Cabral 40'; Gonçalves 50'	Stadium: Estádio Municipal de Braga; Attendance: 7,009; Referee: Luís Godinho

20 August 2021 3	Moreirense	2–3	Braga	Moreira de Cónegos
21:15 WEST (UTC+1)	Vitória 80' (pen.); Paulinho 83'	Report	Martins 39'; Medeiros 41'; Horta 90+5'	Stadium: Parque Joaquim de Almeida Freitas; Attendance: 861; Referee: Hélder Malheiro

29 August 2021 4	Braga	0–0	Vitória de Guimarães	Braga
19:00 WEST (UTC+1)		Report		Stadium: Estádio Municipal de Braga; Attendance: 7,590; Referee: Nuno Almeida

11 September 2021 5	Paços de Ferreira	0–0	Braga	Paços de Ferreira
15:30 WEST (UTC+1)		Report		Stadium: Estádio da Mata Real; Attendance: 1,569; Referee: Willy Delajod

20 September 2021 6	Braga	3–1	Tondela	Braga
21:15 WEST (UTC+1)	Medeiros 80', 90'; R. Horta 83'	Report	Dadashov 86'	Stadium: Estádio Municipal de Braga; Attendance: 5,164; Referee: João Pinheiro

26 September 2021 7	Santa Clara	1–1	Braga	Ponta Delgada
18:00 WEST (UTC+1)	Lincoln 90+5'	Report	P. Oliveira 71'	Stadium: Estádio de São Miguel; Attendance: 1,033; Referee: Fábio Veríssimo

3 October 2021 8	Braga	2–2	Boavista	Braga
20:30 WEST (UTC+1)	Medeiros 25'; R. Horta 52'	Report	Musa 12'; Njie 89'	Stadium: Estádio Municipal de Braga; Attendance: 7,058; Referee: Luís Godinho

25 October 2021 9	Gil Vicente	0–1	Braga	Barcelos
19:00 WEST (UTC+1)		Report	V. Oliveira 4'	Stadium: Estádio Cidade de Barcelos; Attendance: 2,762; Referee: Tiago Martins

1 November 2021 10	Braga	3–0	Portimonense	Braga
19:00 WET (UTC+0)	Galeno 5', 53'; González 90+1'	Report		Stadium: Estádio Municipal de Braga; Attendance: 6,393; Referee: Gustavo Correia

7 November 2021 11	Benfica	6–1	Braga	Lisbon
21:15 WET (UTC+0)	Grimaldo 2'; Núñez 38'; Silva 42', 45+3'; Everton 52', 59'	Report	R. Horta 12'	Stadium: Estádio da Luz; Attendance: 40,577; Referee: Artur Soares Dias

30 November 2021 12	Braga	4–1	Vizela	Braga
20:15 WET (UTC+0)	R. Horta 27', 45' (pen.); Silva 57'; Ruiz 90+3'	Report	Kouao 72'	Stadium: Estádio Municipal de Braga; Attendance: 5,681; Referee: Vítor Ferreira

5 December 2021 13	Braga	2–0	Estoril	Braga
20:30 WET (UTC+0)	R. Horta 34', 39'	Report		Stadium: Estádio Municipal de Braga; Attendance: 3,416; Referee: Gustavo Correia

12 December 2021 14	Porto	1–0	Braga	Porto
20:30 WET (UTC±0)	Luis Díaz 22'	Report		Stadium: Estádio do Dragão; Attendance: 22,307; Referee: António Nobre

19 December 2021 15	Braga	1–0	Belenenses SAD	Braga
21:00 WET (UTC+0)	Moura 1'	Report		Stadium: Estádio Municipal de Braga; Attendance: 3,477; Referee: Luís Godinho

30 December 2021 16	Arouca	0–6	Braga	Arouca
19:00 WET (UTC±0)		Report	V. Oliveira 6', 12', 26'; Medeiros 70' (pen.); Fernandes 75', 79'	Stadium: Estádio Municipal de Arouca; Attendance: 622; Referee: Manuel Oliveira

9 January 2022 17	Braga	2–2	Famalicão	Braga
18:00 WET (UTC±0)	R. Horta 13'; González 90'	Report	Lima 31'; Rodrigues 81'	Stadium: Estádio Municipal de Braga; Attendance: 4,487; Referee: Fábio Melo

15 January 2022 18	Braga	0–1	Marítimo	Braga
18:00 WET (UTC±0)		Report	Winck 89'	Stadium: Estádio Municipal de Braga; Attendance: 5,008; Referee: Gustavo Correia

22 January 2022 19	Sporting CP	1–2	Braga	Lisbon
20:30 WET (UTC±0)	Gonçalves 24'	Report	Galeno 52' (pen.); Gorby 90+7'	Stadium: Estádio José Alvalade; Attendance: 26,989; Referee: Hugo Miguel

30 January 2022 20	Braga	2–0	Moreirense	Braga
18:00 WET (UTC±0)	Musrati 48'; R. Horta 72' (pen.)	Report		Stadium: Estádio Municipal de Braga; Attendance: 5,621; Referee: João Pinheiro

5 February 2022 21	Vitória de Guimarães	2–1	Braga	Guimarães
20:30 WET (UTC±0)	Estupiñán 18'; Da Luz 90'	Report	V. Oliveira 48'	Stadium: Estádio D. Afonso Henriques; Attendance: 15,322; Referee: António Nobre

12 February 2022 22	Braga	2–1	Paços de Ferreira	Braga
15:30 WET (UTC±0)	R. Horta 67', 90'	Report	Antunes 45+1'	Stadium: Estádio Municipal de Braga; Attendance: 7,604; Referee: Gustavo Correia

20 February 2022 23	Tondela	0–1	Braga	Tondela
20:45 WET (UTC±0)		Report	R. Horta 58'	Stadium: Estádio João Cardoso; Attendance: 1,061; Referee: Tiago Martins

28 February 2022 24	Braga	0–0	Santa Clara	Braga
20:15 WET (UTC±0)		Report		Stadium: Estádio Municipal de Braga; Attendance: 7,695; Referee: Vítor Ferreira

5 March 2022 25	Boavista	1–1	Braga	Porto
15:30 WET (UTC±0)	Njie 53'	Report	R. Horta 37' (pen.)	Stadium: Estádio do Bessa; Attendance: 5,139; Referee: Manuel Oliveira

13 March 2022 26	Braga	0–1	Gil Vicente	Braga
20:30 WET (UTC±0)		Report	Gomes 89'	Stadium: Estádio Municipal de Braga; Attendance: 8,092; Referee: Luís Godinho

20 March 2022 27	Portimonense	1–2	Braga	Portimão
20:00 WET (UTC±0)	Carmo 63' (o.g.)	Report	Moura 5'; Couto 22'	Stadium: Estádio Municipal de Portimão; Attendance: 894; Referee: Rui Costa

1 April 2022 28	Braga	3–2	Benfica	Braga
20:15 WEST (UTC+1)	Medeiros 28'; A. Horta 59'; Oliveira 79'	Report	Núñez 74' (pen.); João Mário 77'	Stadium: Estádio Municipal de Braga; Attendance: 16,073; Referee: Luís Godinho

10 April 2022 29	Vizela	0–1	Braga	Vizela
20:30 WEST (UTC+1)		Report	Medeiros 39'	Stadium: Estádio do FC Vizela; Attendance: 3,810; Referee: António Nobre

18 April 2022 30	Estoril	0–0	Braga	Estoril
20:30 WEST (UTC+1)		Report		Stadium: Estádio António Coimbra da Mota; Attendance: 1,246; Referee: Rui Costa

25 April 2022 31	Braga	1–0	Porto	Braga
18:00 WEST (UTC+1)	R. Horta 54'	Report		Stadium: Estádio Municipal de Braga; Attendance: 17,665; Referee: Hugo Miguel

30 April 2022 32	Belenenses SAD	0–1	Braga	Oeiras
21:00 WEST (UTC+1)		Report	R. Horta 90'	Stadium: Estádio Nacional; Attendance: 1,834; Referee: André Narciso

8 May 2022 33	Braga	1–0	Arouca	Braga
18:00 WEST (UTC+1)	R. Horta 87'	Report		Stadium: Estádio Municipal de Braga; Attendance: 16,237; Referee: Tiago Martins

15 May 2022 34	Famalicão	3–2	Braga	Vila Nova de Famalicão
18:00 WEST (UTC+1)	Banza 43', 89'; Rodrigues 80'	Report	R. Horta 1'; Oliveira 19'	Stadium: Estádio Municipal 22 de Junho; Referee: Manuel Mota

=== Taça de Portugal ===
17 October 2021 Third round	Moitense	0–5	Braga	Moita
15:00 WEST (UTC+1)		Report	González 39'; Rodrigues 54'; Fernandes 81'; V. Oliveira 85', 89'	Stadium: Juncal Desportos; Referee: Miguel Nogueira

20 November 2021 Fourth round	Braga	6–0	Santa Clara	Braga
18:00 WET (UTC±0)	V. Oliveira 3', 8', 16', 51'; P. Oliveira 58'; Galeno 88' (pen.)	Report		Stadium: Estádio Municipal de Braga; Referee: João Pinheiro

23 December 2021 Fifth round	Vizela	1–0	Braga	Vizela
18:45 WET (UTC+0)	Moreira 9'	Report		Stadium: Estádio do FC Vizela; Referee: Nuno Almeida

=== Taça da Liga ===
==== Third round ====
Pos	Team	Pld	W	D	L	GF	GA	GD	Pts	Qualification	BOA	PAÇ	BRA
1	Boavista	2	2	0	0	7	2	+5	6	Advance to knockout phase	—	—	5–1
2	Paços de Ferreira	2	0	1	1	1	2	−1	1		1–2	—	—
3	Braga	2	0	1	1	1	5	−4	1		—	0–0	—

Updated to match(es) played on 16 December 2021. Source: Liga Portugal
Rules for classification: Tiebreakers

28 October 2021 2	Braga	0–0	Paços de Ferreira	Braga
20:15 WEST (UTC+01:00)		Report		Stadium: Estádio Municipal de Braga; Attendance: 3,726; Referee: Hélder Malheiro

16 December 2021 3	Boavista	5–1	Braga	Porto
20:15 WET (UTC+00:00)	Sauer 20', 63'; Musa 32'; Njie 34'; Nathan 50'	Report	Medeiros 53' (pen.)	Stadium: Estádio do Bessa; Attendance: 2,094; Referee: Manuel Oliveira

=== Supertaça Cândido de Oliveira ===
31 July 2021 Final	Sporting CP	2–1	Braga	Aveiro
20:45 WEST (UTC+1)	Palhinha (yellow card) 17'; Cabral 29'; Gonçalves 43', (yellow card) 44'; Nunes (yellow card) 49'	Report	Fransérgio 20', (yellow card) 45+2'; Tormena (yellow card) 62'; Sequeira (yellow card) 87'; Novais (yellow card) 90+1'	Stadium: Estádio Municipal de Aveiro; Attendance: 7,710; Referee: João Pinheiro

=== UEFA Europa League ===
==== Group stage ====
The draw for the group stage was held on 27 August 2021.

Pos	Team	Pld	W	D	L	GF	GA	GD	Pts	Qualification	RSB	BRA	MID	LUD
1	(Serbia) Red Star Belgrade	6	3	2	1	6	4	+2	11	Advance to round of 16	—	2–1	0–1	1–0
2	(Portugal) Braga	6	3	1	2	12	9	+3	10	Advance to knockout round play-offs	1–1	—	3–1	4–2
3	(Denmark) Midtjylland	6	2	3	1	7	7	0	9	Transfer to Europa Conference League	1–1	3–2	—	1–1
4	(Bulgaria) Ludogorets Razgrad	6	0	2	4	3	8	−5	2		0–1	0–1	0–0	—

Source: UEFA
Rules for classification: Group stage tiebreakers

16 September 2021 1	Red Star Belgrade (Serbia)	2–1	(Portugal) Braga	Belgrade, Serbia
18:45 CEST (UTC+2)	Rodić 75'; Katai 85' (pen.)	Report	Galeno 76'	Stadium: Rajko Mitić Stadium; Attendance: 24,671; Referee: John Beaton (Scotland)

30 September 2021 2	Braga (Portugal)	3–1	(Denmark) Midtjylland	Braga, Portugal
21:00 WEST (UTC+1)	Galeno 55' (pen.), 90+5'; R. Horta 62'	Report	Evander 19' (pen.)	Stadium: Estádio Municipal de Braga; Attendance: 5,449; Referee: Stéphanie Frappart (France)

21 October 2021 3	Ludogorets Razgrad (Bulgaria)	0–1	(Portugal) Braga	Razgrad, Bulgaria
19:45 EEST (UTC+3)		Report	R. Horta 7'	Stadium: Huvepharma Arena; Attendance: 2,280; Referee: Kristo Tohver (Estonia)

4 November 2021 4	Braga (Portugal)	4–2	(Bulgaria) Ludogorets Razgrad	Braga, Portugal
20:00 WET (UTC+1)	Al-Musrati 25'; Medeiros 37'; Galeno 40'; González 73'	Report	Sotiriou 33'; Plastun 79'	Stadium: Estádio Municipal; Attendance: 6,221; Referee: Glenn Nyberg (Sweden)

25 November 2021 5	Midtjylland (Denmark)	3–2	(Portugal) Braga	Herning, Denmark
18:45 CET (UTC+1)	Sviatchenko 2'; Isaksen 48'; Evander 90+3' (pen.)	Report	R. Horta 43'; Galeno 85'	Stadium: MCH Arena; Attendance: 7,189; Referee: Matej Jug (Slovenia)

9 December 2021 6	Braga (Portugal)	1–1	(Serbia) Red Star Belgrade	Braga, Portugal
21:00 CET (UTC±0)	Galeno 52' (pen.)	Report	Katai 70' (pen.)	Stadium: Estádio Municipal de Braga; Attendance: 5,344; Referee: Marco Guida (Italy)

==== Knockout phase ====
===== Knockout round play-offs =====
The Knockout round play-offs draw was held on 13 December 2021.

17 February 2022 First leg	Sheriff Tiraspol (Moldova)	2–0	(Portugal) Braga	Tiraspol, Moldova
18:45 CET (UTC+1)	Thill 43' (pen.); Traoré 83'	Report		Stadium: Sheriff Stadium; Attendance: 3,062; Referee: Danny Makkelie (Netherlands)

24 February 2022 Second leg	Braga (Portugal)	2–0 (a.e.t.) (2–2 agg.) (3–2 p)	(Moldova) Sheriff Tiraspol	Braga, Portugal
21:00 CET (UTC+0)	Medeiros 17'; R. Horta 43'	Report		Stadium: Estádio Municipal de Braga; Attendance: 9,423; Referee: José María Sánchez Martínez (Spain)
	Penalties
	R. Horta (penalty scored); Musrati (penalty scored); Ruiz (penalty missed); Carmo (penalty missed); Moura (penalty scored)		(penalty missed) Dulanto; (penalty missed) Bruno; (penalty missed) Radeljić; (penalty scored) Khalid; (penalty scored) Thill

===== Round of 16 =====
The draw for the round of 16 was held on 25 February 2022.

10 March 2022 First leg	Braga (Portugal)	2–0	(France) Monaco	Braga, Portugal
21:00 CET (UTC+1)	Ruiz 3'; Carmo (yellow card) 53'; V. Oliveira 90'	Report	Vanderson (yellow card) 14'	Stadium: Estádio Municipal de Braga; Attendance: 10,228; Referee: Felix Zwayer (Germany)

17 March 2022 Second leg	Monaco (France)	1–1 (1–3 agg.)	(Portugal) Braga	Monaco, France
18:45 CET (UTC+1)	Jean Lucas (yellow card) 40'; Golovin (yellow card) 62'; Maripán (yellow card) 86'; Disasi 90'	Report	Ruiz 20'	Stadium: Stade Louis II; Attendance: 3,892; Referee: Andreas Ekberg (Sweden)

===== Quarter-finals =====
The draw for the quarter-finals was held on 18 March 2022.

7 April 2022 First leg	Braga (Portugal)	1–0	(Scotland) Rangers	Braga, Portugal
21:00 CEST (UTC+2)	Carmo (yellow card) 22'; Ruiz 40'	Report	Jack (yellow card) 36'	Stadium: Estádio Municipal de Braga; Attendance: 20,331; Referee: Davide Massa (Italy)

14 April 2022 Second leg	Rangers (Scotland)	3–1 (a.e.t.) (3–2 agg.)	(Portugal) Braga	Glasgow, Scotland
20:00 BST (UTC+1)	Tavernier 2', 44' (pen.); Roofe (yellow card) 85', (goal) 101'	Report	Tormena (red card) 42'; Carmo 83'; A. Horta (yellow card) 98'; Medeiros (yellow card) 105' (yellow-red card) 105'	Stadium: Ibrox Stadium; Attendance: 48,894; Referee: François Letexier (France)
