= 2022–23 UEFA Europa League group stage =

The 2022–23 UEFA Europa League group stage began on 8 September 2022 and ended on 3 November 2022. A total of 32 teams competed in the group stage to decide 16 of the 24 places in the knockout phase of the 2022–23 UEFA Europa League.

Bodø/Glimt, Nantes, Union Berlin and Union Saint-Gilloise made their debut appearances in the Europa League group stage. Union Saint-Gilloise made their debut appearance in a UEFA competition group stage.

A total of 23 national associations were represented in the group stage.

== Draw ==
The draw for the group stage was held on 26 August 2022 in Istanbul, Turkey. The 32 teams were drawn into eight groups of four. For the draw, the teams were seeded into four pots, each of eight teams, based on their 2022 UEFA club coefficients. Teams from the same association could not be drawn into the same group. Prior to the draw, UEFA formed pairings of teams from the same association, including those playing in the Europa Conference League group stage (one pairing for associations with two or three teams, two pairings for associations with four or five teams), based on television audiences, where one team was drawn into Groups A–D and another team was drawn into Groups E–H, so that the two teams would have different kick-off times. The following pairings were announced by UEFA after the group stage teams were confirmed (the second team in a pairing marked by UECL played in the Europa Conference League group stage):

1. (Italy) Roma and Lazio
2. (England) Manchester United and Arsenal
3. (Serbia) Red Star Belgrade and Partizan (UECL)
4. (Ukraine) Dynamo Kyiv and Dnipro-1 (UECL)
5. (Netherlands) Feyenoord and PSV Eindhoven
6. (France) Rennes and Monaco
7. (Spain) Real Sociedad and Real Betis
8. (Sweden) Malmö FF and Djurgårdens IF (UECL)
9. (Denmark) Midtjylland and Silkeborg (UECL)
10. (Norway) Bodø/Glimt and Molde (UECL)
11. (Germany) Union Berlin and SC Freiburg
12. (Turkey) Fenerbahçe and Trabzonspor
13. (France) Nantes and Nice (UECL)
14. Sturm Graz and Austria Wien (UECL)
15. (Cyprus) AEK Larnaca and Omonia
16. (Switzerland) Zürich and Basel (UECL)

== Teams ==
Below were the participating teams (with their 2022 UEFA club coefficients), grouped by their seeding pot. They included:

- 12 teams which entered in this stage
- 10 winners of the play-off round
- 6 losers of the Champions League play-off round (4 from Champions Path, 2 from League Path)
- 4 League Path losers of the third qualifying round

Key to colours
Group winners advanced directly to round of 16
Group runners-up advanced to knockout round play-offs
Third-placed teams entered Europa Conference League knockout round play-offs

Pot 1
Team	Notes	Coeff.
(Italy) Roma		100.000
(England) Manchester United		105.000
(England) Arsenal		80.000
(Italy) Lazio		53.000
(Portugal) Braga		46.000
(Serbia) Red Star Belgrade		46.000
(Ukraine) Dynamo Kyiv		44.000
(Greece) Olympiacos		41.000

Pot 2
Team	Notes	Coeff.
(Netherlands) Feyenoord		40.000
(France) Rennes		33.000
(Netherlands) PSV Eindhoven		33.000
(France) Monaco		26.000
(Spain) Real Sociedad		26.000
(Azerbaijan) Qarabağ		25.000
(Sweden) Malmö FF		23.500
(Bulgaria) Ludogorets Razgrad		23.000

Pot 3
Team	Notes	Coeff.
(Moldova) Sheriff Tiraspol		22.500
(Spain) Real Betis		21.000
(Denmark) Midtjylland		19.000
(Norway) Bodø/Glimt		17.000
(Hungary) Ferencváros		15.500
(Germany) Union Berlin		15.042
(Germany) SC Freiburg		15.042
(Turkey) Fenerbahçe		14.500

Pot 4
Team	Notes	Coeff.
(France) Nantes		12.016
(Finland) HJK		8.500
(Austria) Sturm Graz		7.770
(Cyprus) AEK Larnaca		7.500
(Cyprus) Omonia		7.000
(Switzerland) Zürich		7.000
(Belgium) Union Saint-Gilloise		6.120
(Turkey) Trabzonspor		5.500

Notes

1. ^{EL-PO} Winners of play-off round.
2. ^{CL-CP} Losers of Champions League play-off round (Champions Path).
3. ^{CL-LP} Losers of Champions League play-off round (League Path).
4. ^{CL-LQ} Losers of Champions League third qualifying round (League Path).

== Format ==
In each group, teams played against each other home-and-away in a round-robin format. The winners of each group advanced to the round of 16, while the runners-up advanced to the knockout round play-offs. The third-placed teams were transferred to the Europa Conference League knockout round play-offs, while the fourth-placed teams were eliminated from European competitions for the season.

=== Tiebreakers ===
Teams were ranked according to points (3 points for a win, 1 point for a draw, 0 points for a loss). If two or more teams were tied on points, the following tiebreaking criteria were applied, in the order given, to determine the rankings (see Article 16 Equality of points – group stage, Regulations of the UEFA Europa League):

1. Points in head-to-head matches among the tied teams;
2. Goal difference in head-to-head matches among the tied teams;
3. Goals scored in head-to-head matches among the tied teams;
4. If more than two teams were tied, and after applying all head-to-head criteria above, a subset of teams were still tied, all head-to-head criteria above were reapplied exclusively to this subset of teams;
5. Goal difference in all group matches;
6. Goals scored in all group matches;
7. Away goals scored in all group matches;
8. Wins in all group matches;
9. Away wins in all group matches;
10. Disciplinary points (direct red card = 3 points; double yellow card = 3 points; single yellow card = 1 point);
11. UEFA club coefficient.

Due to the abolition of the away goals rule, head-to-head away goals were no longer applied as a tiebreaker starting from last season. However, total away goals were still applied as a tiebreaker.

== Groups ==
The fixtures were announced on 27 August 2022, the day after the draw. The matches were played on 8 September, 15 September, 6 October, 13 October, 27 October and 3 November 2022. The scheduled kick-off times were 18:45 and 21:00 CET/CEST.

Times are CET/CEST, (Note: CEST (UTC+2) for dates up to 29 October 2022 (matchdays 1–5), and CET (UTC+1) for date thereafter (matchday 6).) as listed by UEFA (local times, if different, are in parentheses).

=== Group A ===
Pos	Team	Pld	W	D	L	GF	GA	GD	Pts	Qualification	ARS	PSV	BOD	ZUR
1	(England) Arsenal	6	5	0	1	8	3	+5	15	Advance to round of 16	—	1–0	3–0	1–0
2	(Netherlands) PSV Eindhoven	6	4	1	1	15	4	+11	13	Advance to knockout round play-offs	2–0	—	1–1	5–0
3	(Norway) Bodø/Glimt	6	1	1	4	5	10	−5	4	Transfer to Europa Conference League	0–1	1–2	—	2–1
4	(Switzerland) Zürich	6	1	0	5	5	16	−11	3		1–2	1–5	2–1	—

Source: UEFA
Rules for classification: Group stage tiebreakers
8 September 2022
18:45

Zürich (Switzerland)	1–2	(England) Arsenal
Kryeziu 44' (pen.)	Report	Marquinhos 16'; Nketiah 62'

Kybunpark, St. Gallen (Note: Zürich played their first home match at Kybunpark, St. Gallen, instead of their regular stadium, Letzigrund, Zürich, due to a music concert and athletic event.)
Attendance: 17,070
Referee: Mohammed Al-Hakim (Sweden)
8 September 2022
18:45

PSV Eindhoven (Netherlands)	1–1	(Norway) Bodø/Glimt
Gakpo 62'	Report	Grønbæk 44'

Philips Stadion, Eindhoven
Attendance: 28,627
Referee: Georgi Kabakov (Bulgaria)

15 September 2022
21:00

Bodø/Glimt (Norway)	2–1	(Switzerland) Zürich
Selnæs 54' (o.g.); Vetlesen 58'	Report	Avdijaj 81'

Aspmyra Stadion, Bodø
Attendance: 8,000
Referee: Stéphanie Frappart (France)

6 October 2022
18:45

Zürich (Switzerland)	1–5	(Netherlands) PSV Eindhoven
Okita 87'	Report	Vertessen 10', 15'; Gakpo 21', 55'; Simons 35'

Letzigrund, Zürich
Attendance: 10,626
Referee: Willie Collum (Scotland)
6 October 2022
21:00 (20:00 UTC+1)

Arsenal (England)	3–0	(Norway) Bodø/Glimt
Nketiah 23'; Holding 27'; Vieira 84'	Report

Emirates Stadium, London
Attendance: 59,724
Referee: Harm Osmers (Germany)

13 October 2022
18:45

Bodø/Glimt (Norway)	0–1	(England) Arsenal
	Report	Saka 24'

Aspmyra Stadion, Bodø
Attendance: 7,922
Referee: Irfan Peljto (Bosnia and Herzegovina)
13 October 2022
21:00

PSV Eindhoven (Netherlands)	5–0	(Switzerland) Zürich
Gutiérrez 9'; Veerman 15', 55'; Sangaré 34'; El Ghazi 84'	Report

Philips Stadion, Eindhoven
Attendance: 30,000
Referee: Ali Palabıyık (Turkey)

20 October 2022
19:00 (18:00 UTC+1) (Note: The Arsenal v PSV Eindhoven match, originally scheduled to be played on 15 September 2022, 21:00 (20:00 UTC+1), was rescheduled to 20 October 2022, 19:00 (18:00 UTC+1), due to conditions related to the death of Elizabeth II.)

Arsenal (England)	1–0	(Netherlands) PSV Eindhoven
Xhaka 71'	Report

Emirates Stadium, London
Attendance: 52,200
Referee: Alejandro Hernández Hernández (Spain)

27 October 2022
18:45

Zürich (Switzerland)	2–1	(Norway) Bodø/Glimt
Boranijašević 67'; Marchesano 90+4'	Report	Pellegrino 45+1'

Letzigrund, Zürich
Attendance: 10,168
Referee: Yevhen Aranovskyi (Ukraine)
27 October 2022
18:45

PSV Eindhoven (Netherlands)	2–0	(England) Arsenal
Veerman 55'; De Jong 63'	Report

Philips Stadion, Eindhoven
Attendance: 35,000
Referee: Marco Di Bello (Italy)

3 November 2022
21:00 (20:00 UTC+0)

Arsenal (England)	1–0	(Switzerland) Zürich
Tierney 17'	Report

Emirates Stadium, London
Attendance: 48,500
Referee: Erik Lambrechts (Belgium)
3 November 2022
21:00

Bodø/Glimt (Norway)	1–2	(Netherlands) PSV Eindhoven
Žugelj 90+3'	Report	Sampsted 36' (o.g.); Bakayoko 52'

Aspmyra Stadion, Bodø
Attendance: 7,985
Referee: Donatas Rumšas (Lithuania)

=== Group B ===
Pos	Team	Pld	W	D	L	GF	GA	GD	Pts	Qualification	FEN	REN	AEK	DKV
1	(Turkey) Fenerbahçe	6	4	2	0	13	7	+6	14	Advance to round of 16	—	3–3	2–0	2–1
2	(France) Rennes	6	3	3	0	11	8	+3	12	Advance to knockout round play-offs	2–2	—	1–1	2–1
3	(Cyprus) AEK Larnaca	6	1	2	3	7	10	−3	5	Transfer to Europa Conference League	1–2	1–2	—	3–3
4	(Ukraine) Dynamo Kyiv	6	0	1	5	5	11	−6	1		0–2	0–1	0–1	—

Source: UEFA
Rules for classification: Group stage tiebreakers
8 September 2022
18:45 (19:45 UTC+3)

AEK Larnaca (Cyprus)	1–2	(France) Rennes
Oier 33'	Report	Theate 29'; Assignon 90+4'

AEK Arena – Georgios Karapatakis, Larnaca
Attendance: 4,103
Referee: Giorgi Kruashvili (Georgia)
8 September 2022
18:45 (19:45 UTC+3)

Fenerbahçe (Turkey)	2–1	(Ukraine) Dynamo Kyiv
Gustavo Henrique 35'; Batshuayi 90+1'	Report	Tsyhankov 63'

Şükrü Saracoğlu Stadium, Istanbul
Attendance: 41,895
Referee: Tamás Bognár (Hungary)

15 September 2022
21:00

Dynamo Kyiv (Ukraine)	0–1	(Cyprus) AEK Larnaca
	Report	Gyurcsó 8'

Stadion Cracovii im. Józefa Piłsudskiego, Kraków, Poland (Note: Due to the Russian invasion of Ukraine, Ukrainian teams were required to play their home matches at neutral venues until further notice. Therefore, Dynamo Kyiv played at Stadion Cracovii im. Józefa Piłsudskiego, Kraków, Poland, instead of their regular stadium NSC Olimpiyskiy, Kyiv.)
Attendance: 3,362
Referee: Jakob Kehlet (Denmark)
15 September 2022
21:00

Rennes (France)	2–2	(Turkey) Fenerbahçe
Terrier 52'; Majer 54'	Report	Kahveci 60'; Valencia 90+2' (pen.)

Roazhon Park, Rennes
Attendance: 20,993
Referee: Aleksei Kulbakov (Belarus)

6 October 2022
21:00

Rennes (France)	2–1	(Ukraine) Dynamo Kyiv
Terrier 23'; D. Doué 89'	Report	Tsyhankov 33'

Roazhon Park, Rennes
Attendance: 24,761
Referee: José María Sánchez Martínez (Spain)
6 October 2022
21:00 (22:00 UTC+3)

Fenerbahçe (Turkey)	2–0	(Cyprus) AEK Larnaca
Batshuayi 26'; Mamas 79' (o.g.)	Report

Şükrü Saracoğlu Stadium, Istanbul
Attendance: 38,860
Referee: Chris Kavanagh (England)

13 October 2022
18:45

Dynamo Kyiv (Ukraine)	0–1	(France) Rennes
	Report	Wooh 48'

Stadion Cracovii im. Józefa Piłsudskiego, Kraków, Poland
Attendance: 5,398
Referee: Serdar Gözübüyük (Netherlands)
13 October 2022
18:45 (19:45 UTC+3)

AEK Larnaca (Cyprus)	1–2	(Turkey) Fenerbahçe
Trickovski 52' (pen.)	Report	João Pedro 16'; Batshuayi 80' (pen.)

AEK Arena – Georgios Karapatakis, Larnaca
Attendance: 6,947
Referee: Paweł Raczkowski (Poland)

27 October 2022
18:45 (19:45 UTC+3)

Fenerbahçe (Turkey)	3–3	(France) Rennes
Valencia 42'; Zajc 82'; Mor 88'	Report	Gouiri 5', 30'; Terrier 16'

Şükrü Saracoğlu Stadium, Istanbul
Attendance: 34,840
Referee: Novak Simović (Serbia)
27 October 2022
18:45 (19:45 UTC+3)

AEK Larnaca (Cyprus)	3–3	(Ukraine) Dynamo Kyiv
Altman 26', 72'; Lopes 53'	Report	Vanat 45'; Harmash 82', 90+2'

AEK Arena – Georgios Karapatakis, Larnaca
Attendance: 4,321
Referee: John Beaton (Scotland)

3 November 2022
21:00

Dynamo Kyiv (Ukraine)	0–2	(Turkey) Fenerbahçe
	Report	Güler 23'; Willian Arão 45+2'

Stadion Cracovii im. Józefa Piłsudskiego, Kraków, Poland
Attendance: 6,304
Referee: Duje Strukan (Croatia)
3 November 2022
21:00

Rennes (France)	1–1	(Cyprus) AEK Larnaca
Abline 17'	Report	Lopes 76'

Roazhon Park, Rennes
Attendance: 27,210
Referee: Mohammed Al-Hakim (Sweden)

=== Group C ===
Pos	Team	Pld	W	D	L	GF	GA	GD	Pts	Qualification	BET	ROM	LUD	HJK
1	(Spain) Real Betis	6	5	1	0	12	4	+8	16	Advance to round of 16	—	1–1	3–2	3–0
2	(Italy) Roma	6	3	1	2	11	7	+4	10	Advance to knockout round play-offs	1–2	—	3–1	3–0
3	(Bulgaria) Ludogorets Razgrad	6	2	1	3	8	9	−1	7	Transfer to Europa Conference League	0–1	2–1	—	2–0
4	(Finland) HJK	6	0	1	5	2	13	−11	1		0–2	1–2	1–1	—

Source: UEFA
Rules for classification: Group stage tiebreakers
8 September 2022
18:45 (19:45 UTC+3)

Ludogorets Razgrad (Bulgaria)	2–1	(Italy) Roma
Cauly 72'; Nonato 88'	Report	Shomurodov 86'

Huvepharma Arena, Razgrad
Attendance: 10,011
Referee: Craig Pawson (England)
8 September 2022
18:45 (19:45 UTC+3)

HJK (Finland)	0–2	(Spain) Real Betis
	Report	Willian José 45+3' (pen.), 64'

Bolt Arena, Helsinki
Attendance: 10,164
Referee: Roi Reinshreiber (Israel)

15 September 2022
21:00

Real Betis (Spain)	3–2	(Bulgaria) Ludogorets Razgrad
Luiz Henrique 25'; Joaquín 39'; Canales 59'	Report	Despodov 45+1'; Rick 74'

Estadio Benito Villamarín, Seville
Attendance: 43,113
Referee: Andris Treimanis (Latvia)
15 September 2022
21:00

Roma (Italy)	3–0	(Finland) HJK
Dybala 47'; Pellegrini 49'; Belotti 68'	Report

Stadio Olimpico, Rome
Attendance: 60,193
Referee: Radu Petrescu (Romania)

6 October 2022
18:45 (19:45 UTC+3)

HJK (Finland)	1–1	(Bulgaria) Ludogorets Razgrad
Hetemaj 55'	Report	Tissera 10'

Bolt Arena, Helsinki
Attendance: 9,751
Referee: Yevhen Aranovskyi (Ukraine)
6 October 2022
21:00

Roma (Italy)	1–2	(Spain) Real Betis
Dybala 34' (pen.)	Report	Rodríguez 40'; Luiz Henrique 88'

Stadio Olimpico, Rome
Attendance: 62,294
Referee: Matej Jug (Slovenia)

13 October 2022
18:45

Real Betis (Spain)	1–1	(Italy) Roma
Canales 34'	Report	Belotti 53'

Estadio Benito Villamarín, Seville
Attendance: 52,472
Referee: Anastasios Sidiropoulos (Greece)
13 October 2022
21:00 (22:00 UTC+3)

Ludogorets Razgrad (Bulgaria)	2–0	(Finland) HJK
Gropper 38'; Rick 64'	Report

Huvepharma Arena, Razgrad
Attendance: 4,623
Referee: Kristo Tohver (Estonia)

27 October 2022
18:45 (19:45 UTC+3)

Ludogorets Razgrad (Bulgaria)	0–1	(Spain) Real Betis
	Report	Fekir 56'

Huvepharma Arena, Razgrad
Attendance: 9,487
Referee: Harald Lechner (Austria)
27 October 2022
21:00 (22:00 UTC+3)

HJK (Finland)	1–2	(Italy) Roma
Hetemaj 54'	Report	Abraham 41'; Hoskonen 62' (o.g.)

Bolt Arena, Helsinki
Attendance: 9,751
Referee: Tiago Martins (Portugal)

3 November 2022
21:00

Roma (Italy)	3–1	(Bulgaria) Ludogorets Razgrad
Pellegrini 56' (pen.), 65' (pen.); Zaniolo 85'	Report	Rick 41'

Stadio Olimpico, Rome
Attendance: 60,807
Referee: Nikola Dabanović (Montenegro)
3 November 2022
21:00

Real Betis (Spain)	3–0	(Finland) HJK
Ruibal 20', 40'; Fekir 90+3'	Report

Estadio Benito Villamarín, Seville
Attendance: 35,384
Referee: Willie Collum (Scotland)

=== Group D ===
Pos	Team	Pld	W	D	L	GF	GA	GD	Pts	Qualification	USG	UBE	BRA	MAL
1	(Belgium) Union Saint-Gilloise	6	4	1	1	11	7	+4	13	Advance to round of 16	—	0–1	3–3	3–2
2	(Germany) Union Berlin	6	4	0	2	4	2	+2	12	Advance to knockout round play-offs	0–1	—	1–0	1–0
3	(Portugal) Braga	6	3	1	2	9	7	+2	10	Transfer to Europa Conference League	1–2	1–0	—	2–1
4	(Sweden) Malmö FF	6	0	0	6	3	11	−8	0		0–2	0–1	0–2	—

Source: UEFA
Rules for classification: Group stage tiebreakers
8 September 2022
18:45

Malmö FF (Sweden)	0–2	(Portugal) Braga
	Report	Rodrigues 30'; R. Horta 70' (pen.)

Stadion, Malmö
Attendance: 13,721
Referee: Duje Strukan (Croatia)
8 September 2022
18:45

Union Berlin (Germany)	0–1	(Belgium) Union Saint-Gilloise
	Report	Lynen 39'

Stadion An der Alten Försterei, Berlin
Attendance: 21,512
Referee: Serhiy Boyko (Ukraine)

15 September 2022
21:00

Union Saint-Gilloise (Belgium)	3–2	(Sweden) Malmö FF
Burgess 17'; Teuma 69'; Boniface 71'	Report	Ceesay 6'; Kiese Thelin 57'

Den Dreef, Leuven (Note: Union Saint-Gilloise played their home matches at Den Dreef, Leuven, instead of their regular stadium, Joseph Marien Stadium, Brussels, which did not meet UEFA requirements.)
Attendance: 4,373
Referee: Bartosz Frankowski (Poland)
15 September 2022
21:00 (20:00 UTC+1)

Braga (Portugal)	1–0	(Germany) Union Berlin
Vitinha 77'	Report

Estádio Municipal, Braga
Attendance: 17,782
Referee: Filip Glova (Slovakia)

6 October 2022
18:45

Malmö FF (Sweden)	0–1	(Germany) Union Berlin
	Report	Becker 68'

Stadion, Malmö
Attendance: 16,057
Referee: Halil Umut Meler (Turkey)
6 October 2022
21:00 (20:00 UTC+1)

Braga (Portugal)	1–2	(Belgium) Union Saint-Gilloise
Ruiz 49'	Report	Nilsson 86', 90+4'

Estádio Municipal, Braga
Attendance: 14,044
Referee: Stéphanie Frappart (France)

13 October 2022
18:45

Union Saint-Gilloise (Belgium)	3–3	(Portugal) Braga
Boniface 20', 62'; Vanzeir 49'	Report	Vitinha 15', 36', 41'

Den Dreef, Leuven
Attendance: 7,851
Referee: Aliyar Aghayev (Azerbaijan)
13 October 2022
21:00

Union Berlin (Germany)	1–0	(Sweden) Malmö FF
Knoche 89' (pen.)	Report

Stadion An der Alten Försterei, Berlin
Attendance: 21,800
Referee: Aleksandar Stavrev (North Macedonia)

27 October 2022
18:45

Malmö FF (Sweden)	0–2	(Belgium) Union Saint-Gilloise
	Report	Teuma 10'; Amani 41'

Stadion, Malmö
Attendance: 10,912
Referee: Roi Reinshreiber (Israel)
27 October 2022
18:45

Union Berlin (Germany)	1–0	(Portugal) Braga
Knoche 68' (pen.)	Report

Stadion An der Alten Försterei, Berlin
Attendance: 21,082
Referee: Craig Pawson (England)

3 November 2022
21:00

Union Saint-Gilloise (Belgium)	0–1	(Germany) Union Berlin
	Report	Michel 6'

Den Dreef, Leuven
Attendance: 5,597
Referee: Andris Treimanis (Latvia)
3 November 2022
21:00 (20:00 UTC+0)

Braga (Portugal)	2–1	(Sweden) Malmö FF
R. Horta 36'; Djaló 55'	Report	Sejdiu 77'

Estádio Municipal, Braga
Attendance: 11,805
Referee: Ruddy Buquet (France)

=== Group E ===
Pos	Team	Pld	W	D	L	GF	GA	GD	Pts	Qualification	RSO	MUN	SHE	OMO
1	(Spain) Real Sociedad	6	5	0	1	10	2	+8	15 (Note: Tied on head-to-head results. Overall goal difference is used as the tiebreaker.)	Advance to round of 16	—	0–1	3–0	2–1
2	(England) Manchester United	6	5	0	1	10	3	+7	15	Advance to knockout round play-offs	0–1	—	3–0	1–0
3	(Moldova) Sheriff Tiraspol	6	2	0	4	4	10	−6	6	Transfer to Europa Conference League	0–2	0–2	—	1–0
4	(Cyprus) Omonia	6	0	0	6	3	12	−9	0		0–2	2–3	0–3	—

Source: UEFA
Rules for classification: Group stage tiebreakers
Notes:
8 September 2022
21:00 (20:00 UTC+1)

Manchester United (England)	0–1	(Spain) Real Sociedad
	Report	Méndez 59' (pen.)

Old Trafford, Manchester
Attendance: 74,310
Referee: Marco Di Bello (Italy)
8 September 2022
21:00 (22:00 UTC+3)

Omonia (Cyprus)	0–3	(Moldova) Sheriff Tiraspol
	Report	Akanbi 2'; Atiemwen 55' (pen.); Diop 76'

GSP Stadium, Nicosia
Attendance: 11,271
Referee: Rade Obrenović (Slovenia)

15 September 2022
18:45 (19:45 UTC+3)

Sheriff Tiraspol (Moldova)	0–2	(England) Manchester United
	Report	Sancho 17'; Ronaldo 39' (pen.)

Zimbru Stadium, Chișinău (Note: Sheriff Tiraspol played their home matches at Zimbru Stadium, Chișinău, instead of their regular stadium, Sheriff Stadium, Tiraspol, due to Transnistria's involvement in the Russian invasion of Ukraine.)
Attendance: 8,734
Referee: Paweł Raczkowski (Poland)
15 September 2022
18:45

Real Sociedad (Spain)	2–1	(Cyprus) Omonia
Guevara 30'; Sørloth 80'	Report	Bruno 72'

Anoeta Stadium, San Sebastián
Attendance: 28,587
Referee: Kristo Tohver (Estonia)

6 October 2022
18:45 (19:45 UTC+3)

Sheriff Tiraspol (Moldova)	0–2	(Spain) Real Sociedad
	Report	Silva 53'; Elustondo 62'

Zimbru Stadium, Chișinău
Attendance: 5,427
Referee: Harald Lechner (Austria)
6 October 2022
18:45 (19:45 UTC+3)

Omonia (Cyprus)	2–3	(England) Manchester United
Ansarifard 34'; Panayiotou 85'	Report	Rashford 53', 84'; Martial 63'

GSP Stadium, Nicosia
Attendance: 20,011
Referee: João Pinheiro (Portugal)

13 October 2022
21:00 (20:00 UTC+1)

Manchester United (England)	1–0	(Cyprus) Omonia
McTominay 90+3'	Report

Old Trafford, Manchester
Attendance: 74,310
Referee: Jérôme Brisard (France)
13 October 2022
21:00

Real Sociedad (Spain)	3–0	(Moldova) Sheriff Tiraspol
Sørloth 45+1'; Rico 66'; Navarro 81'	Report

Anoeta Stadium, San Sebastián
Attendance: 25,806
Referee: Enea Jorgji (Albania)

27 October 2022
21:00 (20:00 UTC+1)

Manchester United (England)	3–0	(Moldova) Sheriff Tiraspol
Dalot 44'; Rashford 65'; Ronaldo 81'	Report

Old Trafford, Manchester
Attendance: 73,764
Referee: Anastasios Sidiropoulos (Greece)
27 October 2022
21:00 (22:00 UTC+3)

Omonia (Cyprus)	0–2	(Spain) Real Sociedad
	Report	Navarro 45+2'; Méndez 60'

GSP Stadium, Nicosia
Attendance: 11,780
Referee: Tamás Bognár (Hungary)

3 November 2022
18:45

Real Sociedad (Spain)	0–1	(England) Manchester United
	Report	Garnacho 17'

Anoeta Stadium, San Sebastián
Attendance: 36,744
Referee: Georgi Kabakov (Bulgaria)
3 November 2022
18:45 (19:45 UTC+2)

Sheriff Tiraspol (Moldova)	1–0	(Cyprus) Omonia
Rasheed 88'	Report

Zimbru Stadium, Chișinău
Attendance: 2,295
Referee: Fran Jović (Croatia)

=== Group F ===
Pos	Team	Pld	W	D	L	GF	GA	GD	Pts	Qualification	FEY	MID	LAZ	STU
1	(Netherlands) Feyenoord	6	2	2	2	13	9	+4	8 (Note: Tied on head-to-head results. Overall goal difference is used as the tiebreaker. Between Feyenoord and Midtjylland, overall goals scored is used as the tiebreaker.)	Advance to round of 16	—	2–2	1–0	6–0
2	(Denmark) Midtjylland	6	2	2	2	12	8	+4	8	Advance to knockout round play-offs	2–2	—	5–1	2–0
3	(Italy) Lazio	6	2	2	2	9	11	−2	8	Transfer to Europa Conference League	4–2	2–1	—	2–2
4	(Austria) Sturm Graz	6	2	2	2	4	10	−6	8		1–0	1–0	0–0	—

Source: UEFA
Rules for classification: Group stage tiebreakers
Notes:
8 September 2022
21:00

Lazio (Italy)	4–2	(Netherlands) Feyenoord
Luis Alberto 4'; Felipe Anderson 15'; Vecino 28', 63'	Report	Giménez 69' (pen.), 88'

Stadio Olimpico, Rome
Attendance: 22,763
Referee: Ricardo de Burgos Bengoetxea (Spain)
8 September 2022
21:00

Sturm Graz (Austria)	1–0	(Denmark) Midtjylland
Emegha 8'	Report

Liebenauer Stadium, Graz
Attendance: 10,521
Referee: Aliyar Aghayev (Azerbaijan)

15 September 2022
18:45

Midtjylland (Denmark)	5–1	(Italy) Lazio
Paulinho 26'; Kaba 30'; Evander 52' (pen.); Isaksen 67'; Sviatchenko 72'	Report	Milinković-Savić 57'

MCH Arena, Herning
Attendance: 9,052
Referee: Nikola Dabanović (Montenegro)
15 September 2022
18:45

Feyenoord (Netherlands)	6–0	(Austria) Sturm Graz
Jahanbakhsh 9', 41'; Hancko 31'; Danilo 34'; Giménez 66'; Idrissi 78'	Report

De Kuip, Rotterdam
Attendance: 30,025
Referee: Jérôme Brisard (France)

6 October 2022
18:45

Sturm Graz (Austria)	0–0	(Italy) Lazio
	Report

Liebenauer Stadium, Graz
Attendance: 14,171
Referee: Benoît Bastien (France)
6 October 2022
21:00

Midtjylland (Denmark)	2–2	(Netherlands) Feyenoord
Isaksen 54'; Juninho 85'	Report	Szymański 23'; Kökçü 45' (pen.)

MCH Arena, Herning
Attendance: 9,044
Referee: Mohammed Al-Hakim (Sweden)

13 October 2022
18:45

Feyenoord (Netherlands)	2–2	(Denmark) Midtjylland
Timber 32'; Hancko 48'	Report	Martínez 16'; Sviatchenko 58'

De Kuip, Rotterdam
Attendance: 43,086
Referee: Rade Obrenović (Slovenia)
13 October 2022
21:00

Lazio (Italy)	2–2	(Austria) Sturm Graz
Immobile 45' (pen.); Pedro 71'	Report	Bøving 56', 83'

Stadio Olimpico, Rome
Attendance: 21,059
Referee: Sascha Stegemann (Germany)

27 October 2022
18:45

Lazio (Italy)	2–1	(Denmark) Midtjylland
Milinković-Savić 36'; Pedro 58'	Report	Isaksen 8'

Stadio Olimpico, Rome
Attendance: 17,756
Referee: Daniel Stefański (Poland)
27 October 2022
21:00

Sturm Graz (Austria)	1–0	(Netherlands) Feyenoord
Kiteishvili 90+3'	Report

Liebenauer Stadium, Graz
Attendance: 13,987
Referee: Espen Eskås (Norway)

3 November 2022
18:45

Midtjylland (Denmark)	2–0	(Austria) Sturm Graz
Dreyer 15', 72'	Report

MCH Arena, Herning
Attendance: 9,134
Referee: Matej Jug (Slovenia)
3 November 2022
18:45

Feyenoord (Netherlands)	1–0	(Italy) Lazio
Giménez 64'	Report

De Kuip, Rotterdam
Attendance: 43,268
Referee: Irfan Peljto (Bosnia and Herzegovina)

=== Group G ===
Pos	Team	Pld	W	D	L	GF	GA	GD	Pts	Qualification	FRE	NAN	QRB	OLY
1	(Germany) SC Freiburg	6	4	2	0	13	3	+10	14	Advance to round of 16	—	2–0	2–1	1–1
2	(France) Nantes	6	3	0	3	6	11	−5	9	Advance to knockout round play-offs	0–4	—	2–1	2–1
3	(Azerbaijan) Qarabağ	6	2	2	2	9	5	+4	8	Transfer to Europa Conference League	1–1	3–0	—	0–0
4	(Greece) Olympiacos	6	0	2	4	2	11	−9	2		0–3	0–2	0–3	—

Source: UEFA
Rules for classification: Group stage tiebreakers
8 September 2022
21:00

Nantes (France)	2–1	(Greece) Olympiacos
Mohamed 32'; Guessand 90+3'	Report	Moutoussamy 50' (o.g.)

Stade de la Beaujoire, Nantes
Attendance: 31,276
Referee: Harald Lechner (Austria)
8 September 2022
21:00

SC Freiburg (Germany)	2–1	(Azerbaijan) Qarabağ
Grifo 7' (pen.); Dōan 15'	Report	Vešović 39'

Europa-Park Stadion, Freiburg im Breisgau
Attendance: 31,500
Referee: Erik Lambrechts (Belgium)

15 September 2022
18:45 (19:45 UTC+3)

Olympiacos (Greece)	0–3	(Germany) SC Freiburg
	Report	Höfler 5'; Gregoritsch 25', 52'

Karaiskakis Stadium, Piraeus
Attendance: 23,104
Referee: Matej Jug (Slovenia)
15 September 2022
18:45 (20:45 UTC+4)

Qarabağ (Azerbaijan)	3–0	(France) Nantes
Owusu 60'; Zoubir 65'; Janković 72'	Report

Tofiq Bahramov Republican Stadium, Baku
Attendance: 26,495
Referee: Enea Jorgji (Albania)

6 October 2022
21:00 (22:00 UTC+3)

Olympiacos (Greece)	0–3	(Azerbaijan) Qarabağ
	Report	Owusu 68'; Vešović 82'; Sheydaev 86'

Karaiskakis Stadium, Piraeus
Attendance: 21,677
Referee: Irfan Peljto (Bosnia and Herzegovina)
6 October 2022
21:00

SC Freiburg (Germany)	2–0	(France) Nantes
Kyereh 48'; Grifo 72'	Report

Europa-Park Stadion, Freiburg im Breisgau
Attendance: 33,200
Referee: Glenn Nyberg (Sweden)

13 October 2022
18:45

Nantes (France)	0–4	(Germany) SC Freiburg
	Report	Kübler 26'; Gregoritsch 71'; Schade 82'; Jeong Woo-yeong 87'

Stade de la Beaujoire, Nantes
Attendance: 31,845
Referee: Horațiu Feșnic (Romania)
13 October 2022
18:45 (20:45 UTC+4)

Qarabağ (Azerbaijan)	0–0	(Greece) Olympiacos
	Report

Tofiq Bahramov Republican Stadium, Baku
Attendance: 31,200
Referee: Craig Pawson (England)

27 October 2022
21:00

SC Freiburg (Germany)	1–1	(Greece) Olympiacos
Kübler 90+3'	Report	El-Arabi 17'

Europa-Park Stadion, Freiburg im Breisgau
Attendance: 33,000
Referee: Kristo Tohver (Estonia)
27 October 2022
21:00

Nantes (France)	2–1	(Azerbaijan) Qarabağ
Blas 16'; Ganago 90+5'	Report	Ozobić 56' (pen.)

Stade de la Beaujoire, Nantes
Attendance: 30,927
Referee: Jakob Kehlet (Denmark)

3 November 2022
18:45 (21:45 UTC+4)

Qarabağ (Azerbaijan)	1–1	(Germany) SC Freiburg
Owusu 90+2'	Report	Petersen 25' (pen.)

Tofiq Bahramov Republican Stadium, Baku
Attendance: 30,430
Referee: Aleksei Kulbakov (Belarus)
3 November 2022
18:45 (19:45 UTC+2)

Olympiacos (Greece)	0–2	(France) Nantes
	Report	Mohamed 79'; Blas 90'

Karaiskakis Stadium, Piraeus
Attendance: 16,254
Referee: Serhiy Boyko (Ukraine)

=== Group H ===
Pos	Team	Pld	W	D	L	GF	GA	GD	Pts	Qualification	FER	MON	TRA	ZVE
1	(Hungary) Ferencváros	6	3	1	2	8	9	−1	10 (Note: Head to head points: Ferencváros 4, Monaco 1.)	Advance to round of 16	—	1–1	3–2	2–1
2	(France) Monaco	6	3	1	2	9	8	+1	10	Advance to knockout round play-offs	0–1	—	3–1	4–1
3	(Turkey) Trabzonspor	6	3	0	3	11	9	+2	9	Transfer to Europa Conference League	1–0	4–0	—	2–1
4	(Serbia) Red Star Belgrade	6	2	0	4	9	11	−2	6		4–1	0–1	2–1	—

Source: UEFA
Rules for classification: Group stage tiebreakers
Notes:
8 September 2022
21:00

Red Star Belgrade (Serbia)	0–1	(France) Monaco
	Report	Embolo 74' (pen.)

Red Star Stadium, Belgrade
Attendance: 40,226
Referee: Harm Osmers (Germany)
8 September 2022
21:00

Ferencváros (Hungary)	3–2	(Turkey) Trabzonspor
Nguen 5', 44' (pen.); Traoré 29'	Report	Gómez 39'; Bozok 71'

Ferencváros Stadion, Budapest
Attendance: 17,987
Referee: Fabio Maresca (Italy)

15 September 2022
18:45 (19:45 UTC+3)

Trabzonspor (Turkey)	2–1	(Serbia) Red Star Belgrade
Hamšík 16'; Trézéguet 68'	Report	Nikolić 89'

Şenol Güneş Sports Complex, Trabzon
Attendance: 24,884
Referee: Sascha Stegemann (Germany)
15 September 2022
18:45

Monaco (France)	0–1	(Hungary) Ferencváros
	Report	Vécsei 79'

Stade Louis II, Monaco
Attendance: 3,931
Referee: Espen Eskås (Norway)

6 October 2022
18:45

Red Star Belgrade (Serbia)	4–1	(Hungary) Ferencváros
Kanga 27' (pen.), 60'; Mitrović 35'; Katai 50'	Report	Zachariassen 71'

Red Star Stadium, Belgrade
Attendance: 26,244
Referee: Lawrence Visser (Belgium)
6 October 2022
18:45

Monaco (France)	3–1	(Turkey) Trabzonspor
Ben Yedder 14', 45+2' (pen.); Disasi 55'	Report	Bakasetas 72'

Stade Louis II, Monaco
Attendance: 5,050
Referee: Giorgi Kruashvili (Georgia)

13 October 2022
21:00 (22:00 UTC+3)

Trabzonspor (Turkey)	4–0	(France) Monaco
Sarr 44' (o.g.); Vitor Hugo 48'; Bardhi 57'; Trézéguet 69'	Report

Şenol Güneş Sports Complex, Trabzon
Attendance: 24,343
Referee: Jakob Kehlet (Denmark)
13 October 2022
21:00

Ferencváros (Hungary)	2–1	(Serbia) Red Star Belgrade
Zachariassen 23'; S. Mmaee 61'	Report	Mitrović 55'

Ferencváros Stadion, Budapest
Attendance: 20,675
Referee: Daniel Stefański (Poland)

27 October 2022
21:00

Red Star Belgrade (Serbia)	2–1	(Turkey) Trabzonspor
Katai 37'; Pešić 64'	Report	Bakasetas 39'

Red Star Stadium, Belgrade
Attendance: 30,431
Referee: João Pinheiro (Portugal)
27 October 2022
21:00

Ferencváros (Hungary)	1–1	(France) Monaco
Zachariassen 81'	Report	Ben Yedder 31'

Ferencváros Stadion, Budapest
Attendance: 20,517
Referee: Enea Jorgji (Albania)

3 November 2022
18:45 (20:45 UTC+3)

Trabzonspor (Turkey)	1–0	(Hungary) Ferencváros
Bakasetas 7'	Report

Şenol Güneş Sports Complex, Trabzon
Attendance: 22,840
Referee: Harm Osmers (Germany)
3 November 2022
18:45

Monaco (France)	4–1	(Serbia) Red Star Belgrade
Volland 5', 27', 87'; Rodić 50' (o.g.)	Report	Kanga 54' (pen.)

Stade Louis II, Monaco
Attendance: 6,341
Referee: Serdar Gözübüyük (Netherlands)
