= Roger Fernandes =

Portuguese footballer

Personal information
- Date of birth: 21 November 2005 (age 20)
- Place of birth: Bissau, Guinea Bissau
- Height: 1.70 m (5 ft 7 in)
- Position: Winger

Team information
- Current team: Al-Ittihad
- Number: 7

Youth career
- 2020–2021: Braga

Senior career*
Years	Team	Apps	(Gls)
2021–2024	Braga B	32	(2)
2021–2025	Braga	53	(8)
2025–	Al-Ittihad	15	(2)

International career^{‡}
2025–	Portugal U21	3	(0)
- * Club domestic league appearances and goals as of 29 April 2026 (UTC) ‡ National team caps and goals as of 10:19, 8 September 2025 (UTC)

Roger Fernandes (born 21 November 2005) is a professional footballer who plays as a winger for Saudi Pro League club Al-Ittihad. Born in Guinea-Bissau, he is a youth international for Portugal.

== Early and personal life ==
Born in Guinea-Bissau on 21 November 2005, Fernandes began playing football in the streets of Bafatá, where he quickly stood out from the rest of the kids. His talent was first spotted by his uncle Eusébio Fernandes, who was both the father and the football agent of three of his cousins, Ricardo Fernandes, Joelson Fernandes, and Saná Fernandes, who all became professional footballers. Given that Roger had never played in a club or even a local championship, his uncle took him to an academy in Bissau, where he stayed for four months, and whilst in the capital, he reencountered one of his older brothers, who had graduated in medicine. Another older brother, Ismael, had moved to Portugal to play football, joining the ranks of Grupo Desportivo Velense in Azores.

In 2019, his uncle pitched the 13-year-old Fernandes to SC Braga, who accepted to give him a trial, so he soon left his home country (to which he never returned), accompanied by both his uncle and a Bible. After spending a weekend with his cousins Joelson and Saná, who at the time were both in the youth academy of Sporting CP, his uncle dropped him at Braga for a few days, during which he convinced the director of Braga's youth development, Hugo Vieira, to keep him. After moving to Portugal, his older brother Ismael spent two years without playing due to being a non-Portuguese minor, something which Roger also went through, although for a shorter period, as he soon achieved Portuguese nationality, but was then halted again by the outbreak of the COVID-19 pandemic.

== Club career ==
=== 2021–22: Record-breaking debut season ===
While planning a summer vacation with his brothers in Lisbon in 2021, Fernandes, who had just become a U19 player, received a call from Vieira, stating that the coach of Braga's first team, Carlos Carvalhal, wanted to watch him alongside the first team players in pre-season. In the absence of Galeno, Fernandes started in the season's first training match against Vizela, impressing Carvalhal with his positioning and understanding of Braga's playing style, and indeed, he had spent the previous days watching videos of Galeno. Carvalhal later stated that he "had never experienced a situation like this" in which a 15-year-old "studied the team he will play for (rather than Barcelona or Liverpool) and then he looked for the positioning of the player who plays in his position in the images to study him".

On 10 July 2021, Fernandes scored his first goal for the Braga first team in a pre-season match against Moreirense. Three weeks later, on 31 July 2021, he made his professional debut with Braga in the 2021 Supertaça Cândido de Oliveira, a 2–1 loss to Sporting CP. At 15 years, 8 months and 12 days, Fernandes became the youngest ever player in the history of the Portuguese Super Cup. He also became the second-youngest player in the club's history, being only 7 days older than Germano Campos, who made his debut in the Campeonato de Portugal in 1922, nearly a century before. Two weeks later, on 14 August, he made his league debut for Braga, again against Sporting, becoming, at the age of 15 years and 266 days, the youngest player in the history of Primeira Liga, beating the record that had been set by Dário Essugo just five months earlier, at the age of 16 years and 6 days.

Two months later, on 17 October 2021, Fernandes scored his first goal for Braga in the third round of the 2021–22 Taça de Portugal against Moitense, becoming, at the age of 15, the club's youngest-ever goalscorer, surpassing Pedro Neto's record, aged 17, set in 2017. Two months later, on 30 December, he scored his first league goals for Braga in a 6–0 thrashing of Arouca, becoming, at the age of 16 years and 39 days, the youngest goalscorer in the history of the Primeira Liga, surpassing Gonçalo Brandão's record, aged 17 years and 9 days, set in 2003. He also became the youngest player to score a brace in Primeira Liga, breaking the previous record set by Cristiano Ronaldo in 2002, aged 17. Two months later, on 17 February 2022, he came on as a late substitute in the first leg of the round of 32 of the 2021–22 UEFA Europa League against Sheriff Tiraspol, becoming, at the age of 16 years and 88 days, the youngest-ever player in the competition's history, breaking the previous record set by Willem Geubbels in 2017.

=== 2022–present ===
Fernandes was a member of the Braga team that participated in the 2023–24 UEFA Youth League. In February 2025, he was named the Best Young Player of February in the Primeira Liga with 14.53% of the votes.

=== Al-Ittihad ===
On 5 September 2025, Fernandes joined Saudi Pro League club Al-Ittihad on a five-year deal.

== International career ==
In September 2022, Fernandes was called up to the Guinea-Bissau national team for a set of friendlies.

In April 2025, the 19-year-old Fernandes completed the naturalization process and became thus eligible to play for Portugal. Along with Lourenço Henriques and Mathias De Amorim, he was one of the three players called up for the 2025 UEFA European Under-21 Championship without having played any games for the Portuguese national teams, starting in all three group stage matches and making two assists to Geovany Quenda in a 5–0 trashing of Poland on 14 June. In his debut against France, which ended in a goalless draw, he had one of his shots cleared off the line by Castello Lukeba.

== Career statistics ==
As of match played 29 April 2026

Appearances and goals by club, season and competition
Club	Season	League			National Cup (Note: Includes Taça de Portugal, King Cup)		League Cup (Note: Includes Taça da Liga)		Continental		Other		Total	
Club	Season	Division	Apps	Goals	Apps	Goals	Apps	Goals	Apps	Goals	Apps	Goals	Apps	Goals
Braga B	2022–23	Liga 3	25	1	—		—		—		—		25	1
Braga B	2023–24	Liga 3	7	1	—		—		—		—		7	1
Braga B	Total		32	2	—		—		—		—		32	2
Braga	2021–22	Primeira Liga	7	2	2	1	0	0	1 (Note: Appearances in UEFA Europa League)	0	1 (Note: Appearance in Supertaça Cândido de Oliveira)	0	11	3
Braga	2022–23	Primeira Liga	0	0	0	0	1	0	0	0	—		1	0
Braga	2023–24	Primeira Liga	14	2	3	0	3	0	4 (Note: Two appearances in UEFA Champions League, two appearances and one goal in UEFA Europa League)	1	—		24	3
Braga	2024–25	Primeira Liga	28	3	4	0	2	0	14	2	—		48	5
Braga	2025–26	Primeira Liga	4	1	—		—		3	0	—		7	1
Braga	Total		53	8	9	1	6	0	22	3	1	0	91	12
Al-Ittihad	2025–26	Saudi Pro League	15	2	4	0	—		9 (Note: Appearances in AFC Champions League Elite)	3	—		28	5
Career total			100	12	13	1	6	0	31	6	1	0	151	19

== Honours ==
Braga

- Taça da Liga: 2023–24
