= Vítor Tormena =

Brazilian footballer (born 1996)

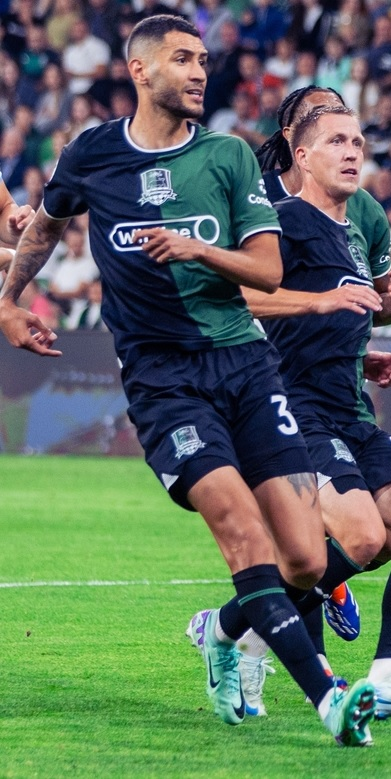
- Tormena with Krasnodar in 2024

Personal information
- Full name: Vítor Tormena de Farias
- Date of birth: 4 January 1996 (age 30)
- Place of birth: Marília, Brazil
- Height: 1.92 m (6 ft 4 in)
- Position: Centre-back

Team information
- Current team: Krasnodar
- Number: 3

Youth career
- São Paulo

Senior career*
| Years | Team | Apps | (Gls) |
| 2017 | São Paulo | 0 | (0) |
| 2017 | → Novorizontino (loan) | 1 | (0) |
| 2017–2019 | Gil Vicente | 35 | (1) |
| 2018–2019 | → Portimonense (loan) | 26 | (1) |
| 2019–2023 | Braga | 81 | (1) |
| 2023– | Krasnodar | 85 | (3) |
- * Club domestic league appearances and goals as of 31 October 2026

Vítor Tormena de Farias (born 4 January 1996) is a Brazilian footballer who plays as a centre-back for Russian Premier League club Krasnodar.

Formed at São Paulo where he played only in the Copa Paulista, he played most of his career in Portugal, making 126 appearances for Braga with whom he won the Taça da Liga (2020) and Taça de Portugal (2021). He also represented Gil Vicente and Portimonense in the country.

== Club career ==
=== São Paulo ===
Born in Marília, São Paulo state, Tormena came through the youth system of São Paulo. He played nine games for them in the 2016 Copa Paulista, debuting on 7 July in a goalless home draw with Red Bull Brasil.

On 8 January 2017, Tormena joined Grêmio Novorizontino on loan for the Campeonato Paulista campaign. He played only once, in a 3–1 loss at Santos on 30 March.

=== Gil Vicente ===
On 27 June 2017, Tormena joined Portuguese LigaPro club Gil Vicente. On 6 August, he made his debut in a 2–1 victory over Porto B. He was sent off on 25 February 2018 in a 2–1 loss at Santa Clara, and scored his first goal on 15 April to open a 1–1 draw at Oliveirense, as his team suffered relegation.

In September 2018, Tormena was loaned to Primeira Liga club Portimonense for the season. A regular during his stay on the Algarve, he scored once away to reigning champions Porto on 7 December, though they won 4–1.

=== Braga ===
On 13 June 2019, Tormena signed a five-year deal at Braga. He made his debut on 15 August as a 71st-minute substitute for Pablo in a 3–1 win (7–3 aggregate) over Brøndby IF in the UEFA Europa League third qualifying round – his continental debut. He played only eight other games through the whole season, including the 1–0 win over Porto in the Taça da Liga final on 25 January 2020; he was affected by two injuries, which he described as the first of his career.

Tormena scored his first goal on 3 December 2020, opening a 4–2 win at AEK Athens in the UEFA Europa League, putting Braga into the last 16. Eleven days later, as a substitute, he netted again in a 7–0 win at Olímpico Montijo in the fourth round of the Taça de Portugal. The following 20 January, he netted the winner in a 2–1 League Cup semi-final win over Benfica, and played in the final loss to Sporting CP.

On 14 April 2022, Tormena was sent off just before half time in a Europa League quarter-final second leg away to Rangers, for a foul on Kemar Roofe; James Tavernier converted the penalty as the Scots won 3–1 to overturn Braga's 1–0 win in the first game. He scored his first league goal for the club on 3 September in a home win over local rivals Vitória S.C., with the last touch of the game in the eighth minute of added time; on 13 November he and Paulo Oliveira were sent off at the end of a 2–1 win at Portimonense. The following 16 February he was again sent off in a European defeat as the team lost 4–0 at home to Fiorentina in the UEFA Europa Conference League knockout round play-off; his foul on Luka Jović was initially given a yellow card until video assistant referee review.

=== Krasnodar ===
On 18 August 2023, Russian Premier League club Krasnodar announced the signing of Tormena on a four-year contract, for a reported fee of €3 million.

On 8 December 2025, Tormena extended his Krasnodar contract to June 2029.

== Career statistics ==
As of match played 31 October 2026

Appearances and goals by club, season and competition
| Club | Season | League | | | State league | | National cup | | League cup | | Continental | | Other | | Total | |
| Club | Season | Division | Apps | Goals | Apps | Goals | Apps | Goals | Apps | Goals | Apps | Goals | Apps | Goals | Apps | Goals |
|---|---|---|---|---|---|---|---|---|---|---|---|---|---|---|---|---|
| São Paulo | 2016 | Série A | 0 | 0 | 0 | 0 | 0 | 0 | — | | — | | — | | 0 | 0 |
| Novorizontino (loan) | 2017 | Paulista A1 | — | | 1 | 0 | 0 | 0 | — | | — | | — | | 1 | 0 |
| Gil Vicente | 2017–18 | LigaPro | 35 | 1 | — | | 0 | 0 | 2 | 0 | — | | — | | 37 | 1 |
| Portimonense (loan) | 2018–19 | Primeira Liga | 26 | 1 | — | | 0 | 0 | 0 | 0 | — | | — | | 26 | 1 |
| Braga | 2019–20 | Primeira Liga | 4 | 0 | — | | 0 | 0 | 2 | 0 | 3 (Note: Appearances in UEFA Europa League) | 0 | — | | 9 | 0 |
| Braga | 2020–21 | Primeira Liga | 25 | 0 | — | | 7 | 1 | 3 | 1 | 6 | 1 | — | | 41 | 3 |
| Braga | 2021–22 | Primeira Liga | 25 | 0 | — | | 2 | 0 | 1 | 0 | 7 | 0 | 1 (Note: Appearance in Supertaça Cândido de Oliveira) | 0 | 36 | 0 |
| Braga | 2022–23 | Primeira Liga | 27 | 1 | — | | 5 | 0 | 2 | 0 | 6 (Note: Five appearances in UEFA Europa League, one appearance in UEFA Europa Conference League) | 0 | — | | 40 | 1 |
| Braga | Total | | 81 | 1 | — | | 14 | 1 | 8 | 1 | 22 | 1 | 1 | 0 | 126 | 4 |
| Krasnodar | 2023–24 | Russian Premier League | 23 | 0 | — | | 4 | 0 | — | | — | | — | | 27 | 0 |
| Krasnodar | 2024–25 | Russian Premier League | 23 | 2 | — | | 3 | 0 | — | | — | | 1 (Note: Appearances in Russian Super Cup) | 0 | 27 | 2 |
| Krasnodar | 2025–26 | Russian Premier League | 27 | 1 | — | | 10 | 0 | — | | — | | 1 | 0 | 38 | 1 |
| Krasnodar | 2026–27 | Russian Premier League | 12 | 0 | — | | 4 | 0 | — | | — | | — | | 16 | 0 |
| Krasnodar | Total | | 85 | 3 | — | | 21 | 0 | — | | — | | 2 | 0 | 108 | 3 |
| Career total | | | 227 | 6 | 1 | 0 | 35 | 1 | 10 | 1 | 22 | 1 | 2 | 0 | 297 | 9 |

== Honours ==
Braga

- Taça de Portugal: 2020–21
- Taça da Liga: 2019–20

Krasnodar

- Russian Premier League: 2024–25
