= Vitinha (footballer, born March 2000) =

Portuguese footballer

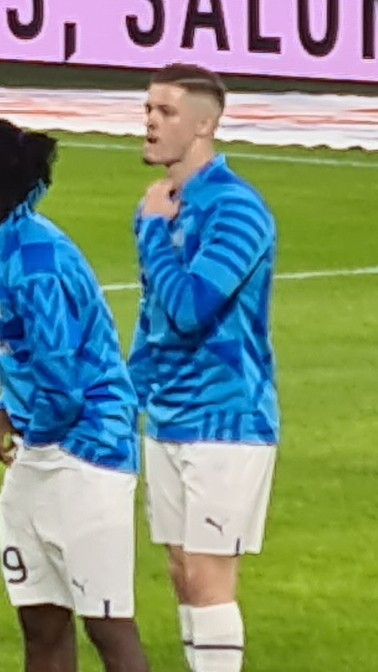

Personal information
- Full name: Vítor Manuel Carvalho Oliveira
- Date of birth: 15 March 2000 (age 26)
- Place of birth: Cabeceiras de Basto, Portugal
- Height: 1.78 m (5 ft 10 in)
- Position: Forward

Team information
- Current team: Genoa
- Number: 9

Youth career
- 2012–2015: Casa Benfica
- 2015–2017: Águias Alvite
- 2017–2020: Braga

Senior career*
Years	Team	Apps	(Gls)
2020–2021	Braga B	15	(13)
2021–2023	Braga	42	(14)
2023–2024	Marseille	32	(5)
2024	→ Genoa (loan)	9	(2)
2024–	Genoa	60	(7)

International career
2018	Portugal U18	3	(0)
2021–2023	Portugal U21	10	(4)
- * Club domestic league appearances and goals as of 25 May 2026

Vítor Manuel Carvalho Oliveira (born 15 March 2000), also known as Vitinha, is a Portuguese professional footballer who plays as a forward for Serie A club Genoa.

== Club career ==
=== Braga ===
Vitinha was born in Cabeceiras de Basto, Braga District. In his first season as a senior, 2020–21, he scored nine goals in only 11 matches for Braga's reserves in the third division.

On 18 January 2021, Vitinha signed a professional contract until 2024. He made his Primeira Liga debut for the first team on 28 February, coming on as a late substitute for Abel Ruiz in a 2–1 away win against Nacional.

Vitinha scored his first goal in the Portuguese top flight on 25 October 2021, the only in the fixture at Gil Vicente. The following month, in the fourth round of the Taça de Portugal, he netted four times in a 6–0 home victory over Santa Clara; he completed his hat-trick in the first 15 minutes of the game.

On 30 December 2021, Vitinha scored three goals in the first half of an eventual 6–0 away rout of Arouca. The following 10 March, again after having replaced Ruiz, he closed the 2–0 home defeat of Monaco in the round of 16 of the UEFA Europa League with an 89th-minute header.

On 13 October 2022, Vitinha scored three times in a 3–3 away draw against Union Saint-Gilloise in the Europa League group stage.

=== Marseille ===
On the last day of the 2023 January transfer window, Vitinha signed a four-and-a-half-year contract with Marseille, with the €32 million fee breaking Braga's previous record of €31 million when Barcelona purchased Francisco Trincão three years earlier. He made his Ligue 1 debut on 5 February, playing the first half of an eventual 1–3 home loss against Nice. He scored his first goals on 16 April, grabbing a brace in the 3–1 win over Troyes also at the Stade Vélodrome.

=== Genoa ===
On 1 February 2024, Vitinha moved to Genoa on loan with an option to buy. His Serie A bow took place two days later, when he featured 20 minutes of a 0–0 draw at Empoli. On 9 March, he scored his first league goal in a 2–3 home defeat against Monza.

On 21 June 2024, Vitinha joined the club on a permanent basis for a reported fee of €16 million, plus €4 million in add-ons and a €42 million buy-back option in favor of Marseille.

== International career ==
Vitinha made his debut for Portugal at under-21 level on 16 November 2021, replacing Gonçalo Ramos at the hour-mark of a 6–0 win against Cyprus in the 2023 UEFA European Championship qualifiers. He scored three goals during that stage, in away victories over Belarus (5–1) and Liechtenstein (9–0).

In October 2022, Vitinha was named in a preliminary 55-man squad for the 2022 FIFA World Cup in Qatar.

== Style of play ==
A complete striker with physical strength, which allows him to protect the ball and turning around to attack the goal, Vitinha also possesses speed with and without the ball, mobility and positional sense.

== Career statistics ==
As of match played 17 May 2026

Appearances and goals by club, season and competition
Club	Season	League			National cup (Note: Includes Taça de Portugal, Coupe de France, Coppa Italia)		League cup (Note: Includes Taça da Liga)		Europe		Other		Total	
Club	Season	Division	Apps	Goals	Apps	Goals	Apps	Goals	Apps	Goals	Apps	Goals	Apps	Goals
Braga B	2020–21	Campeonato de Portugal	11	9	—		—		—		—		11	9
Braga B	2021–22	Liga 3	4	4	—		—		—		—		4	4
Braga B	Total		15	13	—		—		—		—		15	13
Braga	2020–21	Primeira Liga	1	0	1	1	—		0	0	—		2	1
Braga	2021–22	Primeira Liga	24	7	2	6	2	0	9 (Note: Appearances in UEFA Europa League)	1	1 (Note: Appearance in Supertaça Cândido de Oliveira)	0	38	14
Braga	2022–23	Primeira Liga	17	7	3	1	2	1	5	4	—		27	13
Braga	Total		42	14	6	8	4	1	14	5	1	0	67	28
Marseille	2022–23	Ligue 1	14	2	2	0	—		—		—		16	2
Marseille	2023–24	Ligue 1	18	3	2	0	—		7 (Note: One appearance in UEFA Champions League, six appearances and one goal in UEFA Europa League)	1	—		27	4
Marseille	Total		32	5	4	0	—		7	1	—		43	6
Genoa (loan)	2023–24	Serie A	9	2	—		—		—		—		9	2
Genoa	2024–25	Serie A	25	2	2	0	—		—		—		27	2
Genoa	2025–26	Serie A	35	5	1	0	—		—		—		36	5
Genoa	Total		69	9	3	0	—		—		—		72	9
Career total			168	41	13	8	4	1	21	6	1	0	197	56

== Honours ==
Braga

- Taça de Portugal: 2020–21
- Supertaça Cândido de Oliveira runner-up: 2021
