= Daniel Marins =

Brazilian footballer (born 1988)

Personal information
- Full name: Daniel Marins Rodrigues
- Date of birth: March 14, 1988 (age 38)
- Place of birth: Rio de Janeiro, Brazil
- Height: 1.68 m (5 ft 6 in)
- Position: Striker

Team information
- Current team: Figueirense

Youth career
- 2006: Figueirense

Senior career*
Years	Team	Apps	(Gls)
2007	Figueirense		
- * Club domestic league appearances and goals

Daniel Marins Rodrigues, sometimes known as just Daniel (born March 14, 1988), is a Brazilian striker. He currently plays for Figueirense.

== Contract ==
- January 1, 2007 to December 31, 2007
