= Ricardo Horta =

Portuguese footballer (born 1994)

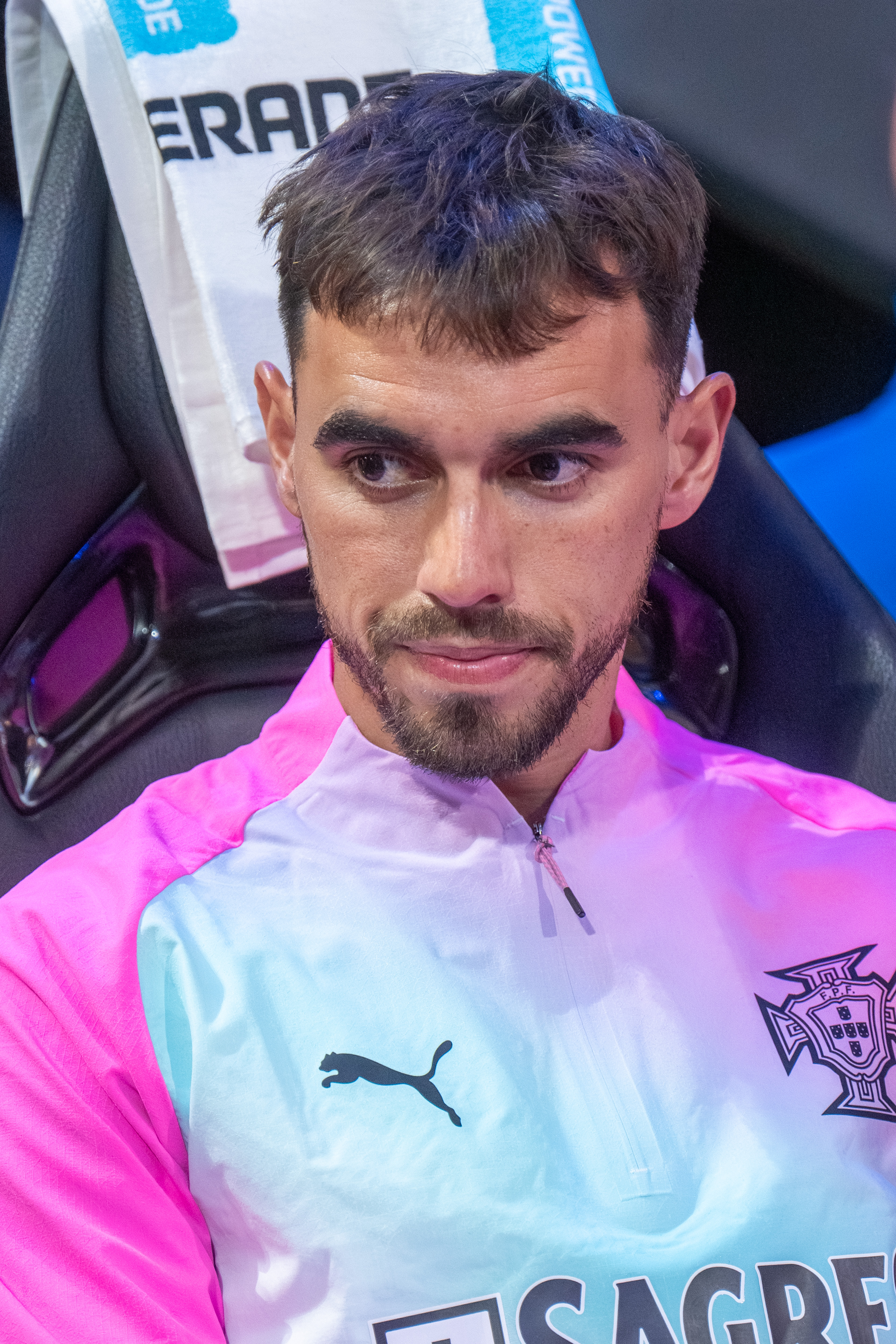
- Horta with Portugal in 2026

Personal information
- Full name: Ricardo Jorge da Luz Horta
- Date of birth: 15 September 1994 (age 32)
- Place of birth: Sobreda, Portugal
- Height: 1.73 m (5 ft 8 in)
- Position: Winger

Team information
- Current team: Braga
- Number: 21

Youth career
- 2003–2004: Ginásio Corroios
- 2004–2011: Benfica
- 2011–2013: Vitória Setúbal

Senior career*
Years	Team	Apps	(Gls)
2013–2014	Vitória Setúbal	34	(7)
2014–2017	Málaga	48	(1)
2016–2017	→ Braga (loan)	32	(6)
2017–	Braga	289	(108)

International career^{‡}
2013	Portugal U19	5	(2)
2014	Portugal U20	6	(3)
2014–2017	Portugal U21	20	(4)
2016	Portugal U23	1	(1)
2014–	Portugal	13	(4)
Medal record
Men's football
Representing Portugal
UEFA European Under-21 Championship
Runner-up	2015 Czech Republic
- * Club domestic league appearances and goals as of 22:26, 8 November 2026 (UTC) ‡ National team caps and goals as of 01:05, 1 April 2026 (UTC)

Ricardo Jorge da Luz Horta (Portuguese pronunciation: [ʁiˈkaɾðuˈɔɾtɐ]; born 15 September 1994) is a Portuguese professional footballer who plays as a right winger for Primeira Liga club Braga, whom he captains, and the Portugal national team.

He spent most of his career with Braga after coming through Benfica's youth academy, playing more than 500 games for the former and scoring a club record 166 goals while winning the 2020–21 Taça de Portugal and two Taça da Liga. In the Primeira Liga, he also represented Vitória de Setúbal, and spent two years with Málaga in La Liga.

Horta finished second with Portugal at the 2015 European Under-21 Championship, also being an international at various youth levels. He made his debut with the full side in 2014, being selected for the 2022 World Cup.

== Club career ==
=== Vitória Setúbal ===
Born in Sobreda, Almada, Horta joined Vitória de Setúbal's youth ranks in 2011, signing from Benfica. On 7 April 2013, he made his first-team and Primeira Liga debut, coming on as a second-half substitute for Cristiano in a 2–1 away loss against Rio Ave. He finished the campaign with six games, all from the bench.

On 9 December 2013, Horta scored his first professional goal, the game's only against Académica de Coimbra. He was a regular starter in his second season, playing 28 matches and scoring seven times.

=== Málaga ===
On 12 July 2014, Horta signed a five-year deal with La Liga side Málaga. He made his debut in the competition on 23 August, starting in a 1–0 home win over Athletic Bilbao.

Horta scored his first goal for on 6 January 2015, in a 2–0 defeat of Levante in the round of 16 of the Copa del Rey also at La Rosaleda Stadium. He finished his spell with 56 appearances, three goals and one assist in all competitions; his only league goal was in a 3–2 victory against Getafe on 28 February.

=== Braga ===
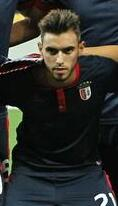
Horta with Braga in 2016

On 5 July 2016, Horta was loaned to Braga for one year. Roughly one year later he joined the club permanently, with Juan Carlos moving in the opposite direction. He scored 11 and eight goals in his second and third seasons respectively, helping to consecutive fourth-place finishes.

In September 2019, Horta added two more seasons to his contract to take him through to 2024, while increasing his buyout clause from €25 million to €30 million. The following 25 January, he scored the only goal in the last seconds of the final of the Taça da Liga against Porto. He set the club's record for goals in European competition on 10 December in a 2–0 home win over Zorya Luhansk in the group stage of the UEFA Europa League, surpassing Paulinho; both players had recently moved past Alan in that chart.

Horta closed the 2–0 defeat of Benfica in the final of the Taça de Portugal on 23 May 2021, to claim the cup competition for the third time in club history. On 3 August, Braga announced the player had rejected the chance to join Major League Soccer side Atlanta United following a bid worth €15 million; his contract with the Minho Province team was extended to 2026 in October.

In 2021–22, Horta became captain after Fransérgio's move to Bordeaux, and had his most prolific season with 19 goals, bettered in the division by only Darwin Núñez and Mehdi Taremi. On 25 April, he scored the only goal against Porto, preventing the visitors from taking the outright European record of 59 league games unbeaten. It was also the 100th of his professional career, and he took the Player of the Month and Forward of the Month award, with two teammates taking the equivalents for other positions as well as manager Carlos Carvalhal. On 15 May, he scored in the first minute of a 3–2 loss at neighbours Famalicão on the final day, thus moving ahead of 1940s player Mário Laranjo as Braga's top scorer with 93.

Horta was linked with a move back to Benfica in the summer of 2022. Málaga, while admitting they rejected a €3 million offer for their undisclosed share in the player's economic rights, spoke of legal action against Braga for not selling him. He scored his 100th goal for the latter on 10 November, opening an eventual 2–1 home win over Moreirense in the fourth round of the domestic cup.

In April 2023, Horta extended his contract with the club until June 2028, with his buyout clause staying set at €30 million. The following 27 January, he scored the equaliser in the league cup final against Estoril, followed by the first goal of the penalty shootout victory.

Horta scored his 100th league goal for Braga on 10 August 2025, closing the 3–0 home defeat of Tondela through a penalty.

== International career ==
Horta was part of the Portugal under-20 team at the 2014 Toulon Tournament and the under-21 one at the 2015 and 2017 UEFA European Championship. He scored in his only appearance in the 2015 competition, in a final runner-up position in the Czech Republic.

On 7 September 2014, Horta earned his first cap for the full side – one week before his 20th birthday – replacing William Carvalho early into the second half of a 0–1 home loss against Albania for the UEFA Euro 2016 qualifiers.

In May 2022, after almost eight years in the international wilderness, Horta was recalled by Fernando Santos for upcoming 2022–23 UEFA Nations League games, playing 20 minutes in the 1–1 draw with Spain in Seville on 2 June and scoring his team's goal. In November, he was named in the final squad for the 2022 FIFA World Cup in Qatar. As the nation had already secured qualification from their group, he started in the last fixture, opening an eventual 2–1 loss to South Korea in Al Rayyan following a cross from Diogo Dalot.

== Personal life ==
Horta's younger brother, André, is also a footballer. He was a teammate at Benfica, Vitória de Setúbal and Braga.

== Career statistics ==
=== Club ===
As of match played 21 November 2026

Appearances and goals by club, season and competition
Club	Season	League			National cup (Note: Includes Taça de Portugal, Copa del Rey)		League cup (Note: Includes Taça da Liga)		Europe		Other		Total	
Club	Season	Division	Apps	Goals	Apps	Goals	Apps	Goals	Apps	Goals	Apps	Goals	Apps	Goals
Vitória Setúbal	2012–13	Primeira Liga	6	0	—		—		—		—		6	0
Vitória Setúbal	2013–14	Primeira Liga	28	7	2	0	5	0	—		—		35	7
Vitória Setúbal	Total		34	7	2	0	5	0	—		—		41	7
Málaga	2014–15	La Liga	31	1	6	2	—		—		—		37	3
Málaga	2015–16	La Liga	17	0	2	0	—		—		—		19	0
Málaga	Total		48	1	8	2	—		—		—		56	3
Braga (loan)	2016–17	Primeira Liga	32	6	2	0	5	2	5 (Note: Appearances in UEFA Europa League)	1	—		44	9
Braga	2017–18	Primeira Liga	30	11	2	0	4	0	7	1	—		43	12
Braga	2018–19	Primeira Liga	34	8	6	0	2	0	2	2	—		44	10
Braga	2019–20	Primeira Liga	33	12	3	2	5	4	11	6	—		52	24
Braga	2020–21	Primeira Liga	32	9	6	3	3	0	7	3	—		48	15
Braga	2021–22	Primeira Liga	32	19	2	0	2	0	12	4	1 (Note: Appearance in Supertaça Cândido de Oliveira)	0	49	23
Braga	2022–23	Primeira Liga	30	14	6	1	1	0	8 (Note: Six appearances and two goals in UEFA Europa League, two appearances in UEFA Europa Conference League)	2	—		45	17
Braga	2023–24	Primeira Liga	28	9	3	2	4	2	10 (Note: Appearances in UEFA Champions League)	0	—		45	13
Braga	2024–25	Primeira Liga	34	10	4	1	2	0	14	3	—		54	14
Braga	2025–26	Primeira Liga	28	14	4	3	3	0	18	4	—		53	21
Braga	2026–27	Primeira Liga	8	2	1	1	1	2	7 (Note: Appearance in UEFA Conference League)	3	—		17	8
Braga	Total		321	114	39	13	32	10	101	29	1	0	494	166
Career total			403	122	49	15	37	10	101	29	1	0	591	176

=== International ===
As of match played 31 March 2026

Appearances and goals by national team and year
National team	Year	Apps	Goals
Portugal	2014	1	0
Portugal	2015	0	0
Portugal	2016	0	0
Portugal	2017	0	0
Portugal	2018	0	0
Portugal	2019	0	0
Portugal	2020	0	0
Portugal	2021	0	0
Portugal	2022	8	2
Portugal	2023	3	2
Portugal	2024	0	0
Portugal	2025	0	0
Portugal	2026	1	0
Total		13	4

Scores and results list Portugal's goal tally first, score column indicates score after each Horta goal.

List of international goals scored by Ricardo Horta
No.	Date	Venue	Cap	Opponent	Score	Result	Competition
1	2 June 2022	Estadio Benito Villamarín, Seville, Spain	2	Spain	1–1	1–1	2022–23 UEFA Nations League A
2	2 December 2022	Education City Stadium, Al Rayyan, Qatar	7	South Korea	1–0	1–2	2022 FIFA World Cup
3	11 September 2023	Estádio Algarve, Faro/Loulé, Portugal	10	Luxembourg	6–0	9–0	2024 UEFA Euro qualifying
4	19 November 2023	Estádio José Alvalade, Lisbon, Portugal	12	Iceland	2–0	2–0	2024 UEFA Euro qualifying

== Honours ==
Braga

- Taça de Portugal: 2020–21; runner-up: 2022–23
- Taça da Liga: 2019–20, 2023–24; runner-up: 2016–17, 2020–21

Portugal U21

- UEFA European Under-21 Championship runner-up: 2015

Individual

- Primeira Liga Team of the Year: 2021–22, 2022–23, 2025–26
