= Abel Ruiz =

Spanish footballer (born 2000)

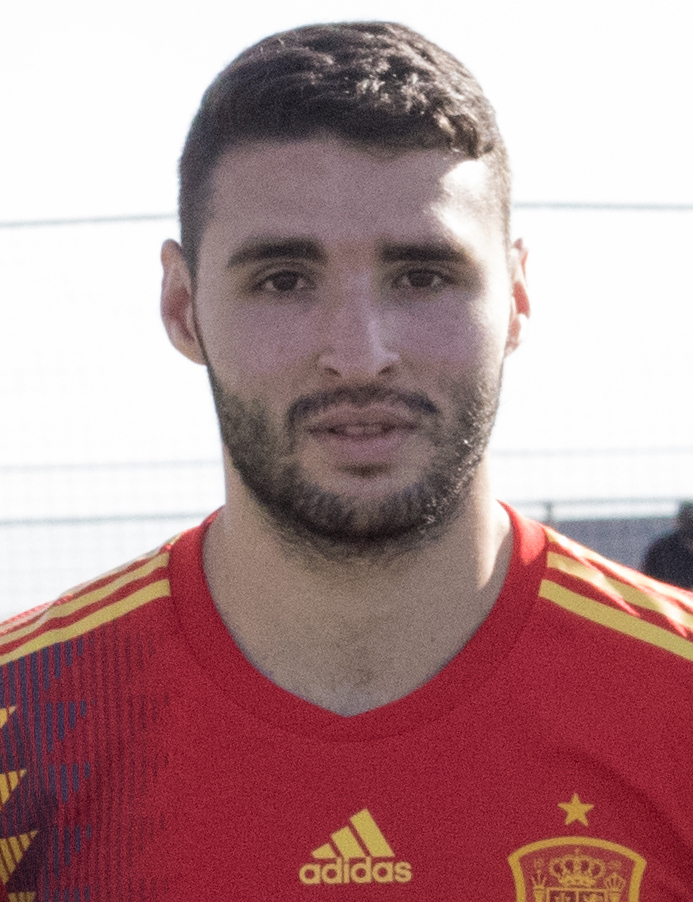
- Ruiz with Spain U19 in 2019

Personal information
- Full name: Abel Ruiz Ortega
- Date of birth: 28 January 2000 (age 26)
- Place of birth: Almussafes, Spain
- Height: 1.80 m (5 ft 11 in)
- Position: Forward

Team information
- Current team: Girona
- Number: 9

Youth career
- 2008–2012: Valencia
- 2012–2017: Barcelona

Senior career*
| Years | Team | Apps | (Gls) |
| 2017–2020 | Barcelona B | 68 | (9) |
| 2019–2020 | Barcelona | 1 | (0) |
| 2020–2024 | Braga | 123 | (20) |
| 2024– | Girona | 41 | (6) |

International career^{‡}
| 2015–2017 | Spain U17 | 38 | (25) |
| 2017–2018 | Spain U18 | 4 | (7) |
| 2017–2019 | Spain U19 | 18 | (7) |
| 2019–2023 | Spain U21 | 27 | (13) |
| 2024 | Spain U23 | 5 | (1) |
| 2021–2023 | Spain | 3 | (0) |
Medal record
Men's football
Representing Spain
Olympic Games
| Gold medal – first place | 2024 Paris | Team |
UEFA European Under-21 Championship
| Runner-up | 2023 Georgia–Romania | Team |
UEFA European Under-19 Championship
| Winner | 2019 Armenia | Team |
Mediterranean Games
| Winner | 2018 Spain |
FIFA U-17 World Cup
| Runner-up | 2017 India | Team |
UEFA European Under-17 Championship
| Winner | 2017 Croatia | Team |
| Runner-up | 2016 Azerbaijan | Team |
- * Club domestic league appearances and goals as of 18 October 2026 (UTC) ‡ National team caps and goals as of 9 August 2024

Abel Ruiz Ortega (Spanish pronunciation: [aˈβel ˈrwiθ]; born 28 January 2000) is a Spanish professional footballer who plays as a forward for Segunda División club Girona.

Formed at Barcelona, where he made one first-team appearance, he moved to Braga in January 2020, where he won the Taça de Portugal in 2021.

Ruiz set the record for caps and goals for Spain's under-17 team, winning the European Championship in 2017 and finishing runners-up in 2016 and at the 2017 World Cup. He made his senior international debut in 2021.

== Club career ==
=== Barcelona ===
Born in Almussafes, Valencian Community, Ruiz joined Barcelona's youth setup in 2012, from Valencia. On 21 November 2016, he renewed his contract with the club.

On 9 April 2017, while still a junior, Ruiz made his senior debut with the reserves, coming on as a late substitute for Jesús Alfaro in a 2–0 Segunda División B away win against Badalona; he also became the first player born in the 2000s to make an appearance for the club's senior ranks.

After Barcelona B's promotion, Ruiz made his professional team debut on 28 August 2017, replacing David Concha in an 3–0 home loss against Tenerife in the Segunda División championship. Four days later he scored his first professional goal in a 2–2 draw against Granada.

Ruiz had his first-team debut in the Supercopa de Catalunya on 7 March 2018, scoring the winning penalty in a shootout against Espanyol. His La Liga debut came on 12 May 2019 in a 2–0 win against Getafe, as a substitute for Philippe Coutinho for the final 21 minutes at the Camp Nou.

=== Braga ===
On 31 January 2020, Ruiz joined Portugal's Braga on loan for the rest of the season, with a mandatory purchase for €8 million and a buy-back clause. He made his debut on 20 February in the round of 32 first leg of the UEFA Europa League away to Rangers, starting the game and scoring in a 3–2 loss. Totalling eight appearances over the season, he scored his first Primeira Liga goal on 4 July soon after entering in a 4–0 home win over Aves.

Ruiz was the top scorer in the Taça de Portugal as Braga won it in 2020–21, contributing seven goals in as many games. This included two in a 3–2 win away to Porto in the semi-finals.

In 2021–22, Ruiz scored in each leg of a 3–1 aggregate win over Monaco in the Europa League last 16. He netted the only goal of the game in the next fixture against Rangers, though the Scots won 3–2 over the two games after extra time.

=== Girona ===
On 27 June 2024, Ruiz signed for La Liga club Girona on a contract until June 2029.

== International career ==
Ruiz made his debut for the Spain under-17 team on 25 October 2015, starting and scoring the first in a 2–0 2016 UEFA European Under-17 Championship qualification win against Andorra. He was also named in the list for the finals in Azerbaijan, despite being one year younger than his teammates.

Ruiz finished the competition with four goals, being awarded the Silver Boot; he was also included in the tournament's best eleven. During the 2017 edition in Croatia, he captained the side as Spain achieved their ninth title.

On 22 September 2017, Ruiz was included in Santiago Denia's squad ahead of the 2017 FIFA U-17 World Cup, and scored two braces in the tournament, scoring two goals in a 4–0 win against Niger on 10 October, and two more in a 3–1 semi-finals win against Mali on 25 October.

Due to the isolation of some national team players following the positive COVID-19 test of Sergio Busquets, Spain's under-21 squad were called up for the international friendly against Lithuania on 8 June 2021. Ruiz made his senior debut in the 4–0 win in Leganés, missing a penalty in the match.

At the 2023 UEFA European Under-21 Championship, in the 20th second of the match against Croatia, Ruiz scored the quickest goal in the history of the tournament, bringing a 1–0 victory to Spain and advancement to the quarter-finals. He finished as runner-up as England defeated Spain by 1-0 in the final and was named in the Team of the Tournament.

Ruiz was called up to Spain U23 for the 2024 Summer Olympics as one of the three overaged players in the squad. He was appointed as the team captain and later became an Olympic gold medalist as Spain beat the hosts France 5–3 after extra time in the gold medal match.

== Career statistics ==
=== Club ===
As of match played 27 October 2026

Appearances and goals by club, season and competition
| Club | Season | League | | | National cup (Note: Includes Taça de Portugal, Copa del Rey) | | League cup (Note: Includes Taça da Liga) | | Europe | | Other | | Total | |
| Club | Season | Division | Apps | Goals | Apps | Goals | Apps | Goals | Apps | Goals | Apps | Goals | Apps | Goals |
|---|---|---|---|---|---|---|---|---|---|---|---|---|---|---|
| Barcelona B | 2016–17 | Segunda División B | 2 | 0 | — | | — | | — | | — | | 2 | 0 |
| Barcelona B | 2017–18 | Segunda División | 26 | 3 | — | | — | | — | | — | | 26 | 3 |
| Barcelona B | 2018–19 | Segunda División B | 21 | 3 | — | | — | | — | | — | | 21 | 3 |
| Barcelona B | 2019–20 | Segunda División B | 19 | 3 | — | | — | | — | | — | | 19 | 3 |
| Barcelona B | Total | | 68 | 9 | — | | — | | — | | — | | 68 | 9 |
| Barcelona | 2018–19 | La Liga | 1 | 0 | 0 | 0 | — | | 0 | 0 | — | | 1 | 0 |
| Braga (loan) | 2019–20 | Primeira Liga | 6 | 1 | 0 | 0 | 0 | 0 | 2 (Note: Appearances in UEFA Europa League) | 1 | — | | 8 | 2 |
| Braga | 2020–21 | Primeira Liga | 25 | 3 | 7 | 7 | 3 | 1 | 4 | 0 | — | | 39 | 11 |
| Braga | 2021–22 | Primeira Liga | 28 | 2 | 2 | 0 | 2 | 0 | 10 | 3 | 1 (Note: Appearance in Supertaça Cândido de Oliveira) | 0 | 43 | 5 |
| Braga | 2022–23 | Primeira Liga | 34 | 8 | 5 | 2 | 4 | 1 | 8 (Note: Six appearances and one goal in UEFA Europa League, two appearances in UEFA Europa Conference League) | 1 | — | | 51 | 12 |
| Braga | 2023–24 | Primeira Liga | 30 | 6 | 3 | 0 | 4 | 0 | 11 (Note: Nine appearances and one goal in UEFA Champions League, two appearances in UEFA Europa League) | 1 | — | | 48 | 7 |
| Braga | Total | | 117 | 19 | 17 | 9 | 13 | 2 | 33 | 6 | 1 | 0 | 181 | 36 |
| Girona | 2024–25 | La Liga | 23 | 4 | 1 | 0 | — | | 3 (Note: Appearances in UEFA Champions League) | 0 | — | | 27 | 4 |
| Girona | 2025–26 | La Liga | 9 | 0 | 2 | 0 | — | | — | | — | | 11 | 0 |
| Girona | 2026–27 | La Liga | 9 | 2 | 1 | 1 | — | | — | | — | | 10 | 3 |
| Girona | Total | | 41 | 6 | 4 | 1 | — | | 3 | 0 | — | | 48 | 7 |
| Career total | | | 233 | 35 | 21 | 10 | 13 | 2 | 38 | 6 | 1 | 0 | 306 | 53 |

=== International ===
As of match played 24 July 2024

Appearances and goals by national team and year
| National team | Year | Apps | Goals |
|---|---|---|---|
| Spain | 2021 | 2 | 0 |
| Spain | 2022 | 0 | 0 |
| Spain | 2023 | 0 | 0 |
| Spain | 2024 | 1 | 0 |
| Total | | 3 | 0 |

== Honours ==
Barcelona Youth

- UEFA Youth League: 2017–18

Barcelona

- La Liga: 2018–19

Braga

- Taça de Portugal: 2020–21
- Taça da Liga: 2023–24

Spain U17

- UEFA European Under-17 Championship: 2017; runner-up: 2016
- FIFA Under-17 World Cup runner-up: 2017

Spain U18

- Mediterranean Games: 2018

Spain U19

- UEFA European Under-19 Championship: 2019

Spain U21

- UEFA European Under-21 Championship runner-up: 2023

Spain U23

- Summer Olympics gold medal: 2024

Individual

- UEFA European Under-17 Championship Silver Boot: 2016
- UEFA European Under-17 Championship Team of the Tournament: 2017
- FIFA Under-17 World Cup Bronze Boot: 2017 (6 goals)
- Mediterranean Games top scorer: 2018 (7 goals)
- Taça de Portugal top scorer: 2020–21 (7 goals)
- UEFA European Under-21 Championship top scorer: 2023 (3 goals)
- UEFA European Under-21 Championship Team of the Tournament: 2023

Records

- Top scorer in the history of UEFA European Under-17 Championship finals: 8 goals (shared with Amine Gouiri and Odsonne Édouard)
- Top scorer in the history of UEFA European Under-17 Championship: 16 goals (shared with José Gomes)
- Top scorer in the history of the Spain under-17 team: 27 goals
- Most-capped player in the history of the Spain under-17 team: 37 appearances
