= Eduardo Schürrle =

Portuguese footballer

Personal information
- Full name: Eduardo Ferreira Soares
- Date of birth: 17 August 2001 (age 25)
- Place of birth: Braga, Portugal
- Height: 1.73 m (5 ft 8 in)
- Position: Midfielder

Youth career
- 2010–2014: ADC Aveleda
- 2014–2019: Braga

Senior career*
Years	Team	Apps	(Gls)
2019–2023	Braga B	67	(16)
2021–2023	Braga	1	(0)
2022–2023	→ Trofense (loan)	12	(0)
2023–2025	Oliveirense	36	(2)

International career^{‡}
2017	Portugal U16	2	(0)
2018–2019	Portugal U18	9	(2)
2019	Portugal U19	6	(0)
- * Club domestic league appearances and goals as of 2 February 2025 ‡ National team caps and goals as of 05:30, 31 December 2021 (UTC)

Eduardo Ferreira Soares (born 17 August 2001), known as Eduardo Schürrle, is a Portuguese professional footballer who plays as a midfielder.

== Professional career ==
Schürrle is a product of the youth academies of ADC Aveleda and Braga. On 20 December 2017, he signed his first professional contract with Braga. He made his professional debut for Braga as a late sub in a 6–0 Primeira Liga win over Arouca on 30 December 2021.

On 19 August 2022, Braga announced that Schürrle would be sent on a season-long loan to Liga Portugal 2 side Trofense.

On 8 July 2023, Schürrle signed for Liga Portugal 2 side Oliveirense on a permanent deal, with Braga keeping 50% of the player's economic rights.

== International career ==
Schürrle is a youth international for Portugal, having represented the Portugal U16s, U18s, and U19s.

== Personal life ==
When he first joined Braga, there was another footballer named Eduardo and to differentiate he got his nickname Schürrle; his manager noted his physical resemblance to the German footballer André Schürrle.
