= Apúlia e Fão =

- Civil parish
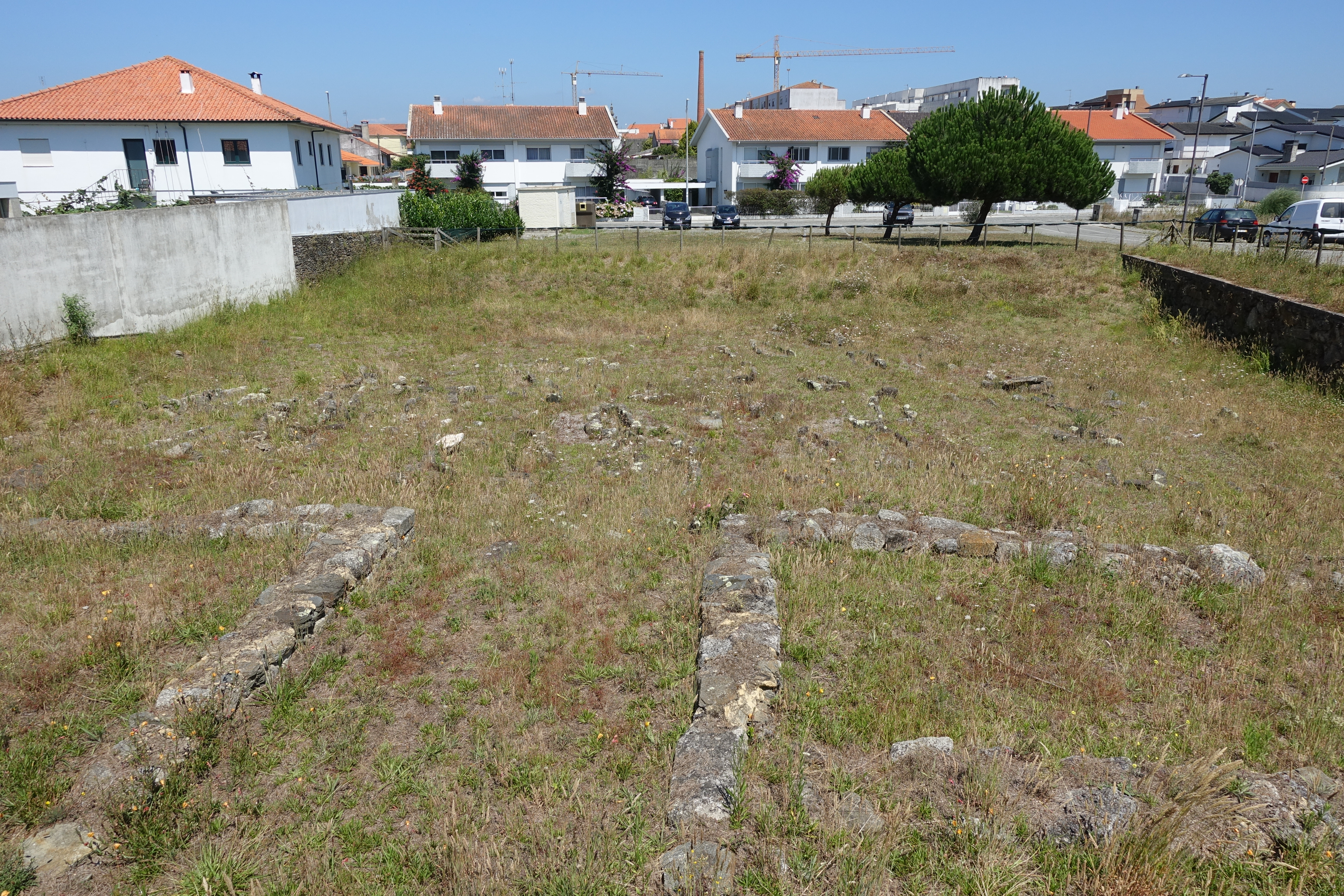

- Location in Portugal
- Coordinates: 41.485°N 8.770°W
- Country: Portugal
- Region: Norte
- Intermunic. comm.: Cávado
- District: Braga
- Municipality: Esposende

Area
  - Total: 16.29 km^{2} (6.29 sq mi)

Population (2011)
  - Total: 7,301
  - Density: 448.2/km^{2} (1,161/sq mi)
- Time zone: UTC+00:00 (WET)
  - Summer (DST): UTC+01:00 (WEST)

Apúlia e Fão is a civil parish in the municipality of Esposende, Portugal. It was formed in 2013 by the merger of the former parishes Apúlia and Fão. The population in 2011 was 7,301, in an area of 16.29 km^{2} (6.29 sq mi).
