= Bruno Rodrigues (footballer, born 2001) =

Portuguese footballer

Personal information
- Full name: Bruno Miguel Ferreira Rodrigues
- Date of birth: 8 June 2001 (age 25)
- Place of birth: Barreiro, Portugal
- Height: 1.92 m (6 ft 4 in)
- Position: Centre-back

Team information
- Current team: Chaves
- Number: 4

Youth career
- 2009–2015: Fabril
- 2015–2016: Sporting CP
- 2016–2017: Vitória Setúbal
- 2017–2019: Braga

Senior career*
Years	Team	Apps	(Gls)
2019–2022	Braga B	34	(1)
2020–2023	Braga	22	(0)
2023	→ Fatih Karagümrük (loan)	5	(0)
2023–	Chaves	81	(2)

International career
2019	Portugal U18	2	(0)
2019–2020	Portugal U19	2	(0)
- * Club domestic league appearances and goals as of 20 June 2026

Bruno Miguel Ferreira Rodrigues (born 8 June 2001) is a Portuguese professional footballer who plays as a central defender for Liga Portugal 2 club Chaves.

== Club career ==
Born in Barreiro, Setúbal District, Rodrigues joined S.C. Braga at the age of 16. He spent his first two seasons as a senior with the reserve side in the third division.

Rodrigues played his first competitive game with the first team on 28 December 2020, coming on as a last-minute substitute in a 4–1 away win against Boavista F.C. in the Primeira Liga. Three days later, he signed a three-and-a-half-year professional contract with the club until 2025.

Rodrigues scored his first goal for Braga on 17 October 2021, the second in the 5–0 away victory over UFC Moitense in the third round of the Taça de Portugal. His first in the UEFA Europa League arrived the following 8 September, when he opened a 2–0 group-stage defeat of Malmö FF.

On 28 January 2023, Rodrigues was loaned to Fatih Karagümrük S.K. of the Turkish Süper Lig with an option to buy. In June, he agreed to a permanent deal at G.D. Chaves, with Braga keeping 50% of the player's economic rights.
