= 2017–18 Associação Académica de Coimbra – O.A.F. season =

Académica
2017–18 season
- President: Pedro Dias Roxo
- Coach: Ivo Vieira (until 13 November 2017); Ricardo Soares (from 14 November 2017 until 31 March 2018); Quim Machado (from 1 April 2018)
- Stadium: Estádio Cidade de Coimbra
- LigaPro: 4th
- Taça de Portugal: Fifth Round
- Taça da Liga: First round
- Top goalscorer: League: Djoussé (11); All: Djoussé (12)
- Highest home attendance: 20,446; Académica 1–2 Cova da Piedade (5 May 2018)
- Lowest home attendance: 1,171; Académica 0–0 Arouca (23 July 2017)
- Average home league attendance: 3,934

The 2017–18 season is Académica's second season in the LigaPro. This season they will also take part in the Taça de Portugal and Taça da Liga.

== Pre-season and friendlies ==
Win Draw Loss

6 July 2017 Friendly	Académica (Portugal)	1–1	(Portugal) Académico de Viseu	Coimbra
10:30 WEST (UTC+01:00)	Marinho 55'		Bruno Loureiro 29'	Stadium: Academia Dolce Vita

8 July 2017 Friendly	Porto (Portugal)	2–2	(Portugal) Académica	Vila Nova de Gaia
10:30 WEST (UTC+01:00)	Soares; Galeno		Traquina; Ki	Stadium: CTFD PortoGaia

11 July 2017 Friendly	Académica (Portugal)	0–1	(Portugal) Oliveirense	Coimbra
10:30 WEST (UTC+01:00)			Jardiel 39'	Stadium: Academia Dolce Vita

15 July 2017 Torneio Capital do Móvel	Paços de Ferreira (Portugal)	0–0	(Portugal) Académica	Paços de Ferreira
18:00 WEST (UTC+01:00)				Stadium: Estádio da Mata Real

15 July 2017 Torneio Capital do Móvel	Académica (Portugal)	0–1	(Portugal) Porto B	Paços de Ferreira
19:00 WEST (UTC+01:00)			Fede Varela (pen.)	Stadium: Estádio da Mata Real

18 July 2017 Troféu Crédito Agrícola	Académica (Portugal)	1–1 (a.e.t.) (4–5 p)	(Portugal) Tondela	Coimbra
21:00 WEST (UTC+01:00)	Ki 31'		Murilo 85'	Stadium: Estádio Cidade de Coimbra
	Penalties
	D. Ribeiro (penalty missed); Pedroso (penalty scored); Brendon (penalty scored); Djoussé (penalty scored); R. Ribeiro (penalty scored); Luisinho (penalty missed)		(penalty scored) R. Costa; (penalty scored) D. Bruno; (penalty scored) Murilo; (penalty scored) Pité; (penalty missed) J. Vasco; (penalty scored) Boyd

29 July 2017 Torneio Triangular "Vila da Sertã"	Académica (Portugal)	0–0	(Portugal) Oleiros	Sertã
16:00 WEST (UTC+01:00)				Stadium: Dr. Marques dos Santos

29 July 2017 Torneio Triangular "Vila da Sertã"	Sertanense (Portugal)	1–0	(Portugal) Académica	Sertã
17:00 WEST (UTC+01:00)				Stadium: Dr. Marques dos Santos

== Competitions ==
=== Overall record ===
As of match played on 12 May 2018

Performance by competition
Competition	Starting round	Current position/round	Final position/round	First match	Last match
LigaPro	—	—	4th	6 August 2017	12 May 2018
Taça de Portugal	Second round	Fifth round	Fifth round	23 September 2017	30 December 2017
Taça da Liga	First round	—	First round	23 July 2017	

Statistics by competition
Competition	Pld	W	D	L	GF	GA	GD	Win%
LigaPro	38	19	6	13	59	40	+19	50.00
Taça de Portugal	4	3	1	0	6	3	+3	75.00
Taça da Liga	1	0	1	0	0	0	+0	0.00
Total	43	22	8	13	65	43	+22	51.16

=== LigaPro ===
==== League table ====
Pos	Team	Pld	W	D	L	GF	GA	GD	Pts	Promotion or relegation
2	Santa Clara (P)	38	19	9	10	55	40	+15	66	Promotion to the Primeira Liga
3	Académico de Viseu	38	17	13	8	50	40	+10	64	
4	Académica	38	19	6	13	59	40	+19	63	
5	Penafiel	38	17	11	10	55	43	+12	62	
6	Arouca	38	16	11	11	42	37	+5	59	

Source: Liga Portugal
Rules for classification: 1) Points; 2) Head-to-head points; 3) Head-to-head goal difference; 4) Head-to-head away goals scored; 5) Goal difference; 6) Matches won; 7) Goals scored; 8) Play-off.
(Note: The LPFP decided that only criteria 1, 5, 6 and 7 would be applied to establish the classification during the competition.)
(P) Promoted

==== Results by round ====
Round	1	2	3	4	5	6	7	8	9	10	11	12	13	14	15	16	17	18	19	20	21	22	23	24	25	26	27	28	29	30	31	32	33	34	35	36	37	38
Ground	A	H	A	A	H	A	H	A	H	A	H	A	H	A	H	A	H	A	H	H	A	H	H	A	H	A	H	A	H	A	H	A	H	A	H	A	H	A
Result	L	W	L	L	D	W	W	D	L	L	W	W	W	W	D	W	W	L	W	D	W	W	L	W	L	D	D	W	W	L	L	L	W	W	W	W	L	L
Position	16	9	14	18	18	12	8	9	13	16	12	8	6	6	6	4	4	4	2	2	2	2	2	2	2	2	3	2	2	5	5	7	6	4	3	3	4	4

Updated to match(es) played on 12 May 2018. Source:
A = Away; H = Home; W = Win; D = Draw; L = Loss

==== Matches ====
6 August 2017 1	Ac. Viseu	2–1	Académica	Viseu
16:00 WET (UTC+01:00)	Rui Miguel 51'; Sandro 88' (pen.)	Report	Marreco 7'	Stadium: Estádio do Fontelo; Attendance: 1,505; Referee: Daniel Cardoso

12 August 2017 2	Académica	2–0	Braga B	Coimbra
11:15 WET (UTC+01:00)	Marreco 10'; Zé Tiago 19'	Report		Stadium: Estádio Cidade de Coimbra; Attendance: 1,540; Referee: Sérgio Piscarreta

19 August 2017 3	União da Madeira	3–0	Académica	Ribeira Brava
16:00 WET (UTC+01:00)	Luan 12', 65'; Júnior 50'	Report		Stadium: Centro Desportivo da Madeira; Attendance: 1,058; Referee: Gonçalo Martins

23 August 2017 4	Santa Clara	3–1	Académica	Ponta Delgada
16:00 WET (UTC+01:00)	Rashid 6' (pen.); Thiago 44'; Mike 45+3' (o.g.)	Report	Chiquinho 30' (pen.)	Stadium: Estádio de São Miguel; Attendance: 1,490; Referee: João Capela

28 August 2017 5	Académica	1–1	Gil Vicente	Coimbra
19:30 WET (UTC+01:00)	D. Ribeiro 90+4'	Report	Rui Miguel 68'	Stadium: Estádio Cidade de Coimbra; Attendance: 2,012; Referee: Rui Oliveira

9 September 2017 6	Vitória de Guimarães B	0–3	Académica	Guimarães
16:00 WET (UTC+01:00)		Report	Balogun 45+1'; Marreco 47', 50'	Stadium: Estádio D. Afonso Henriques; Attendance: 2,757; Referee: Claúdio Pereira

16 September 2017 7	Académica	4–2	Sporting B	Coimbra
11:15 WET (UTC+01:00)	Real 3'; Dias 45+2', 53'; Pedroso 55'	Report	Ponde 7' (pen.), 49'	Stadium: Estádio Cidade de Coimbra; Attendance: 2,365; Referee: Luís Godinho

30 September 2017 9	Académica	1–2	Benfica B	Coimbra
17:00 WET (UTC+01:00)	Pedroso 87' (pen.)	Report	Zé Gomes 57'; Heri 81'	Stadium: Estádio Cidade de Coimbra; Attendance: 2,744; Referee: Bruno Rebocho

7 October 2017 8	Penafiel	0–0	Académica	Penafiel
16:00 WET (UTC+01:00)		Report		Stadium: Estádio Municipal 25 de Abril; Attendance: 608; Referee: João Pinto

21 October 2017 10	Leixões	1–0	Académica	Matosinhos
16:00 WET (UTC+01:00)	Breitner 20' (pen.)	Report		Stadium: Estádio do Mar; Attendance: 1,110; Referee: Luís Ferreira

28 October 2017 11	Académica	4–1	Arouca	Coimbra
17:00 WET (UTC+01:00)	Deyvison 2' (o.g.); Chiquinho 27'; Djoussé 77', 90+3'	Report	N. Valente 46'	Stadium: Estádio Cidade de Coimbra; Attendance: 2,323; Referee: Vítor Ferreira

1 November 2017 12	Oliveirense	0–2	Académica	Aveiro
15:00 WET (UTC+00:00)		Report	Chiquinho 49'; Djoussé 72'	Stadium: Estádio Municipal de Aveiro; Attendance: 483; Referee: Carlos Xistra

5 November 2017 13	Académica	1–0	Nacional	Coimbra
15:00 WET (UTC+00:00)	Djoussé 1'	Report		Stadium: Estádio Cidade de Coimbra; Attendance: 2,627; Referee: Manuel Oliveira

26 November 2017 14	Porto B	1–2	Académica	Vila Nova de Gaia
15:00 WET (UTC±00:00)	Madi 82'	Report	Real 18'; Dias 90+4'	Stadium: Estádio Dr. Jorge Sampaio; Attendance: 568; Referee: Bruno Paixão

3 December 2017 15	Académica	1–1	Famalicão	Coimbra
15:00 WET (UTC±00:00)	Balogun 31'	Report	Willian 56' (pen.)	Stadium: Estádio Cidade de Coimbra; Attendance: 4,402; Referee: André Narciso

9 December 2017 16	Real	3–4	Académica	Queluz
15:00 WET (UTC±00:00)	Abdoulaye 46'; Vinícius 56'; Touré 74'	Report	Djoussé 14', 90+3'; D. Ribeiro 63'; Real 71'	Stadium: Complexo Desportivo do Real SC; Attendance: 847; Referee: Nuno Almeida

17 December 2017 17	Académica	2–0	Sporting da Covilhã	Coimbra
15:00 WET (UTC±00:00)	Joel 16' (o.g.); Chiquinho 69' (pen.)	Report		Stadium: Estádio Cidade de Coimbra; Attendance: 4,006; Referee: Bruno Esteves

22 December 2017 18	Cova da Piedade	2–1	Académica	Cova da Piedade
15:00 WET (UTC±00:00)	Cléo 34' (pen.); Ballack 87'	Report	Djoussé 28'	Stadium: Estádio Municipal José Martins Vieira; Attendance: 1,050; Referee: João Capela

6 January 2018 19	Académica	1–0	Varzim	Coimbra
17:00 WET (UTC±00:00)	Harramiz 12'	Report		Stadium: Estádio Cidade de Coimbra; Attendance: 3,012; Referee: Jorge Sousa

13 January 2018 20	Académica	1–1	Académico de Viseu	Coimbra
11:15 WET (UTC±00:00)	Marinho 90'	Report	Avto 13'	Stadium: Estádio Cidade de Coimbra; Attendance: 6,009; Referee: Nuno Almeida

21 January 2018 21	Braga B	0-3	Académica	Braga
15:00 WET (UTC±00:00)		Report	Luisinho 22'; Chiquinho 43'; Djoussé 56'	Stadium: Estádio 1º de Maio; Attendance: 500; Referee: António Nobre

29 January 2018 22	Académica	4-2	União da Madeira	Coimbra
16:00 WET (UTC±00:00)	Djoussé 15', 45+3'; João Real 18'; Ricardo Dias 88'	Report	Tiago Almeida 14'; Sylla 34'	Stadium: Estádio Cidade de Coimbra; Attendance: 4,332; Referee: Carlos Espadinha

4 February 2018 23	Académica	0-1	Santa Clara	Coimbra
11:15 WET (UTC±00:00)		Report	Pacheco 24'	Stadium: Estádio Cidade de Coimbra; Attendance: 4,236; Referee: Bruno Paixão

11 February 2018 24	Gil Vicente	0-4	Académica	Barcelos
11:15 WET (UTC±00:00)		Report	Guima 23'; Luisinho 40'; Djoussé 55' (pen.); Ricardo Dias 85'	Stadium: Estádio Cidade de Barcelos; Attendance: 752; Referee: Hélder Malheiro

17 February 2018 25	Académica	1-2	Vitória de Guimarães B	Coimbra
18:00 WET (UTC±00:00)	Luisinho 10'	Report	Bence Bíró 47'; Yuri 50' (o.g.)	Stadium: Estádio Cidade de Coimbra; Attendance: 4,842; Referee: Rui Oliveira

24 February 2018 26	Sporting B	2-2	Académica	Alcochete
15:00 WET (UTC±00:00)	Barbosa 10'; Delgado 59'	Report	Chiquinho 38'; Pedroso 90+1' (pen.)	Stadium: CGD Stadium Aurélio Pereira; Attendance: 476; Referee: Gonçalo Martins

4 March 2018 27	Académica	1-1	Penafiel	Coimbra
15:00 WET (UTC±00:00)	Chiquinho 24' (pen.)	Report	Fortes 15'	Stadium: Estádio Cidade de Coimbra; Attendance: 4,136; Referee: Nuno Almeida

9 March 2018 28	Benfica B	0-4	Académica	Seixal
19:00 WET (UTC±00:00)		Report	F. Alexandre 5'; Chiquinho 35', 66' (pen.); Marinho 81'	Stadium: Caixa Futebol Campus; Attendance: 397; Referee: Artur Soares Dias

14 March 2018 29	Académica	2-1	Leixões	Coimbra
15:00 WET (UTC±00:00)	Balogun 2'; R. Alves 37' (o.g.)	Report	E. Brandão 35'	Stadium: Estádio Cidade de Coimbra; Attendance: 3,842; Referee: Jorge Sousa

18 March 2018 30	Arouca	1-0	Académica	Arouca
15:00 WET (UTC±00:00)	Paločević 85' (pen.)	Report		Stadium: Estádio Municipal de Arouca; Attendance: 1,575; Referee: Luís Godinho

31 March 2018 31	Académica	0-2	Oliveirense	Coimbra
16:00 WET (UTC±00:00)		Report	Valente 18'; Fati 90+7'	Stadium: Estádio Cidade de Coimbra; Attendance: 3,222; Referee: João Malheiro Pinto

7 April 2018 32	Nacional	1-0	Académica	Funchal
11:45 WET (UTC±00:00)	Ricardo 55'	Report		Stadium: Estádio da Madeira; Attendance: 3,871; Referee: Tiago Martins

15 April 2018 34	Famalicão	1-2	Académica	Vila Nova de Famalicão
16:00 WEST (UTC+01:00)	Lima 24'	Report	Marinho 72'; Traquina 87'	Stadium: Estádio Municipal 22 de Junho; Attendance: 1,506; Referee: Rui Oliveira

22 April 2018 35	Académica	1-0	Real	Coimbra
16:00 WEST (UTC+01:00)	João Real 69'	Report		Stadium: Estádio Cidade de Coimbra; Attendance: 4,116; Referee: Humberto Teixeira

25 April 2018 33	Académica	1-0	Porto B	Coimbra
16:00 WET (UTC±00:00)	Djoussé 90+8'	Report		Stadium: Estádio Cidade de Coimbra; Attendance: 11,043; Referee: Carlos Espadinha

29 April 2018 36	Sporting da Covilhã	0-1	Académica	Covilhã
16:00 WEST (UTC+01:00)		Report	Alan Júnior 8'	Stadium: Estádio Municipal José dos Santos Pinto; Attendance: 1,238; Referee: Bruno Paixão

5 May 2018 37	Académica	1-2	Cova da Piedade	Coimbra
16:00 WEST (UTC+01:00)	Marinho 55'	Report	Dieguinho 19', 22'	Stadium: Estádio Cidade de Coimbra; Attendance: 20,446; Referee: Manuel Mota

13 May 2018 38	Varzim	1-0	Académica	Póvoa de Varzim
16:00 WEST (UTC+01:00)	Macedo 18'	Report		Stadium: Estádio do Varzim SC; Attendance: 1,047; Referee: Manuel Oliveira

=== Taça de Portugal ===
==== Second round ====
23 September 2017	Mirandela	1–2	Académica	Mirandela
15:00 WEST (UTC+01:00)	Yerson 51'		Djoussé 85'; Pedroso 90+3'	Stadium: Estádio São Sebastião; Referee: Jorge Sousa

==== Third round ====
15 October 2017	Académica	2–1 (a.e.t.)	Paços de Ferreira	Coimbra
19:00 WEST (UTC+01:00)	Pedroso 90+12'; Marinho 108'		Phellype 45+7'	Stadium: Estádio Cidade de Coimbra; Referee: João Pinheiro

==== Fourth round ====
19 November 2017	Académica	1–0	Nacional	Coimbra
15:00 WET (UTC±00:00)	Marinho 62'			Stadium: Estádio Cidade de Coimbra; Referee: Luís Godinho

==== Fifth round ====
30 December 2017	Caldas	1–1 (a.e.t.) (4–2 p)	Académica	Caldas da Rainha
15:00 WET (UTC±00:00)	Rodrigues 18'		Mike 68'	Stadium: Campo da Mata; Referee: Vítor Ferreira
	Penalties
	Rodrigues (penalty scored); Clemente (penalty scored); Cruz (penalty scored); Januário (penalty missed); Simões (penalty scored)		(penalty missed) Pedroso; (penalty missed) Chiquinho; (penalty scored) Hwang Mun-ki; (penalty scored) Harramiz

=== Taça da Liga ===
==== First round ====
23 July 2017	Académica	0–0 (2–4 p)	Arouca	Coimbra
19:30 WEST (UTC+01:00)		Report		Stadium: Estádio Cidade de Coimbra; Attendance: 1,244; Referee: Jorge Costa
	Penalties
	Djoussé (penalty scored); Mike (penalty missed); Empis (penalty missed); Lagoa (penalty scored)		(penalty scored) Paločević; (penalty scored) Jubal; (penalty scored) N. Coelho; (penalty missed) N. Valente; (penalty scored) Kuca

== Players ==
=== Appearances and goals ===
As of match played on 12 May 2018

No.	Pos.	Nat.	Player	Primeira Liga			Taça de Portugal			Taça da Liga			Total		
5	DF	(Portugal)	Pedro Empis	6	5	0	0	0	0	1	0	0	7	5	0
6	MF	(Portugal)	Ricardo Dias	25	1	5	4	0	0	0	0	0	29	1	5
7	FW	(Portugal)	Marinho	18	7	4	2	1	2	1	0	0	21	8	6
8	MF	(South Korea)	Hwang Mun-ki	9	8	0	0	2	0	1	0	0	10	9	0
9	FW	(Portugal)	Leandro Cardoso	0	0	0	0	0	0	0	0	0	0	0	0
10	MF	(Portugal)	Zé Tiago	12	10	1	1	0	0	1	0	0	14	10	1
11	FW	(Nigeria)	Femi Balogun	20	2	3	3	0	0	0	0	0	23	2	3
13	DF	(Portugal)	João Real	34	0	5	3	0	0	1	0	0	38	0	5
14	DF	(Portugal)	João Simões	7	0	0	0	0	0	0	0	0	7	0	0
18	DF	(Portugal)	Nuno Esgueirão	0	0	0	0	0	0	0	0	0	0	0	0
19	DF	(Portugal)	Nélson Pedroso	30	0	3	4	0	2	0	0	0	34	0	5
20	FW	(Portugal)	João Traquina	1	1	1	0	0	0	0	0	0	1	1	1
21	MF	(Portugal)	Guima	22	6	1	4	0	0	1	0	0	27	6	1
22	MF	(Portugal)	Chiquinho	34	0	9	3	1	0	0	0	0	37	1	9
23	DF	(Portugal)	Mike Moura	27	1	0	4	0	1	1	0	0	32	1	1
30	MF	(Portugal)	David Teles	0	1	0	0	0	0	0	1	0	0	2	0
31	DF	(Portugal)	Pedro Coronas	0	0	0	0	0	0	0	0	0	0	0	0
39	FW	(Cameroon)	Donald Djoussé	20	12	10	2	2	1	0	1	0	22	15	11
43	DF	(Brazil)	Brendon	9	2	0	0	0	0	0	0	0	9	2	0
44	DF	(Brazil)	Yuri Matias	11	2	0	2	1	0	1	0	0	14	3	0
59	GK	(Portugal)	Guilherme Oliveira	1	0	-1	2	0	-2	0	0	0	2	0	-2
65	MF	(Portugal)	Fernando Alexandre	4	4	1	0	0	0	0	0	0	4	4	1
66	FW	(Portugal)	Diogo Ribeiro	2	11	2	2	0	0	0	0	0	4	11	2
70	FW	(Guinea-Bissau)	Piqueti	0	6	0	0	0	0	0	0	0	0	6	0
77	FW	(Portugal)	Luisinho	18	7	3	1	1	0	0	1	0	19	9	3
83	DF	(Portugal)	Zé Castro	16	0	0	2	0	0	0	0	0	19	0	0
87	GK	(Portugal)	Ricardo Ribeiro	34	0	-33	2	0	-1	1	0	0	37	0	-34
90	FW	(Portugal)	Tozé Marreco	10	3	4	0	2	0	1	0	0	11	5	4
99	FW	(Portugal)	Alan Júnior	6	6	0	0	0	0	0	0	0	6	6	0
Players transferred out during the season
1	GK	(Portugal)	João Gomes	0	0	0	0	0	0	0	0	0	0	0	0
4	DF	(Portugal)	Hugo Ribeiro	0	0	0	0	0	0	0	0	0	0	0	0
24	FW	(São Tomé and Príncipe)	Harramiz	8	8	1	2	2	0	0	0	0	10	10	1
25	DF	(Portugal)	Tiago Duque	1	1	0	1	0	0	0	0	0	2	1	0
27	MF	(Portugal)	Pedro Lagoa	1	0	0	0	0	0	1	0	0	2	0	0

Source: Equipa

=== Transfers ===
==== Summer ====
In: (Note: Please note that this table only shows those players released or sold who were part of the first team.)

Date	Position	Player	From	Fee	Ref
27 June 2017	MF	(Portugal) Zé Tiago	(Portugal) Aves	Free	
27 June 2017	DF	(Portugal) Nélson Pedroso	(Portugal) Aves	Free	
27 June 2017	DF	(Portugal) Mike	(Portugal) Covilhã	Free	
28 June 2017	DF	(Brazil) Brendon	(Portugal) Portimonense	Undisclosed	
29 June 2017	DF	(Portugal) Pedro Empis	(Portugal) Sporting CP	1-year loan	
29 June 2017	MF	(Portugal) Guima	(Portugal) Sporting CP	1-year loan	
29 June 2017	GK	(Portugal) Guilherme Oliveira	(Portugal) Sporting CP	Undisclosed	
13 July 2017	MF	(Portugal) Rui Sampaio	(Portugal) Freamunde	Free	
18 July 2017	FW	(Cameroon) Donald Djoussé	(Portugal) Marítimo	1-year loan	
18 July 2017	FW	(Portugal) Luisinho	(Portugal) Boavista	Undisclosed	
21 July 2017	MF	(Portugal) Chiquinho	(Croatia) Lokomotiva Zagreb	1-year loan	
2 August 2017	DF	(Portugal) Tiago Duque	(Portugal) Belenenses	1-year loan	
7 August 2017	FW	(São Tomé and Príncipe) Harramiz	(Portugal) Covilhã	Free	
24 August 2017	MF	(Portugal) Ricardo Dias	(Portugal) Belenenses	1-year loan	
31 August 2017	FW	(Nigeria) Femi Balogun	(Portugal) Belenenses	1-year loan	
25 September 2017	DF	(Portugal) Zé Castro	(Spain) Rayo Vallecano	Free	

Out: (Note: Please note that this table only shows those players released or sold who were part of the first team.)

Date	Position	Player	To	Fee	Ref
1 June 2017	DF	(Portugal) Alexandre Alfaiate	(Portugal) Benfica	Loan ended	
1 June 2017	DF	(Portugal) Diogo Coelho	(Portugal) Nacional	Loan ended	
1 June 2017	FW	(Ghana) Ernest Ohemeng	(Portugal) Moreirense	Loan ended	
1 June 2017	MF	(Brazil) Kaká	(Portugal) Mafra	Loan ended	
1 June 2017	MF	(Portugal) Leandro Silva	(Portugal) Porto	Loan ended	
1 June 2017	MF	(Portugal) Artur Taborda	(Portugal) Mortágua	Released	(Note: Taborda joined Mortágua following his release.)
1 June 2017	GK	(Portugal) José Costa	(Portugal) Penafiel	Released	(Note: José Costa joined Penafiel following his release.)
1 June 2017	MF	(Cape Verde) Jimmy	(Portugal) Marinhense	Released	(Note: Jimmy joined Marinhense following his release.)
1 June 2017	FW	(Burkina Faso) Nii Plange	(Portugal) Nacional	Released	(Note: Nii Plange joined Nacional following his release.)
1 June 2017	MF	(Portugal) Nuno Piloto		Released	
1 June 2017	DF	(Portugal) Nuno Santos		Released	
1 June 2017	DF	(Portugal) Pedro Correia	(Portugal) Vilafranquense	Released	(Note: Pedro Correia joined Vilafranquense following his release.)
1 June 2017	FW	(Portugal) Rui Miguel	(Portugal) Gil Vicente	Released	(Note: Rui Miguel joined Gil Vicente following his release.)
1 June 2017	MF	(Cape Verde) Tom Tavares	(Portugal) Casa Pia	Released	(Note: Tom Tavares joined Casa Pia following his release.)
1 June 2017	DF	(France) Tripy Makonda		Released	
7 July 2017	FW	(Portugal) André Vidigal	(Netherlands) Fortuna Sittard	1-year loan	
8 August 2017	FW	(Portugal) Dany Marques	(Portugal) Fátima	Undisclosed	
9 August 2017	MF	(Portugal) Rui Sampaio	(Portugal) Cova da Piedade	Released	(Note: Rui Sampaio joined Cova da Piedade following his release.)
15 August 2017	MF	(Portugal) Vasco Ferreira	(Portugal) Oleiros	1-year loan	

==== Winter ====
In:

Date	Position	Player	From	Fee	Ref
25 January 2018	FW	(Brazil) Alan Júnior	(Portugal) Benfica	6-month loan	
26 January 2018	FW	(Guinea-Bissau) Piqueti	(Portugal) Marítimo	6-month loan	
30 January 2018	DF	(Portugal) Pedro Coronas	(Portugal) Marítimo	6-month loan	

Out:

Date	Position	Player	To	Fee	Ref
1 January 2018	DF	(Portugal) Tiago Duque	(Portugal) Belenenses	Loan ended	
31 January 2018	FW	(São Tomé and Príncipe) Harramiz	(Portugal) Tondela	Undisclosed	

== Coaching staff ==
Position	Staff
Coach	(Portugal) Quim Machado
Assistant Coach	(Portugal) Hélder Moreira
Fitness Coach	(Portugal) Vítor Vinha
Goalkeeping Coach	(Portugal) Vítor Alves

Last updated: 1 April 2018
Source: Equipa Técnica
