= List of Brazilian football transfers summer 2019–20 =

Brazilian football transfers

This is the 2019–2020 winter transfer window for Brazilian football season 2019–20. Additionally, players without a club may join at any time, clubs may sign players on loan at any time, and clubs may sign a goalkeeper on an emergency loan if they have no registered goalkeeper available. It includes football transfers related to clubs from the Campeonato Brasileiro Série A and Campeonato Brasileiro Série B.

Note that the summer transfer window in Brazil occurs during the new year, and the winter transfer window occurs during the mid-year. The summer transfer window is open from January 1 to March 31.

== Campeonato Brasileiro Série A ==
=== Athletico Paranaense ===
In: Note: Flags indicate national team as defined under FIFA eligibility rules; some limited exceptions apply. Players may hold more than one non-FIFA nationality.

No.	Pos.	Nation	Player
—	MF	(Brazil) BRA	Fernando Canesin (from (Belgium) KV Oostende)
—	FW	(Brazil) BRA	Julimar (on loan from Criciúma)
—	MF	(Brazil) BRA	Reinaldo (on loan from Criciúma)
—	MF	(Brazil) BRA	Léo Gomes (from Vitória)
—	MF	(Brazil) BRA	Pedro do Rio (from Ferroviária)

Out: Note: Flags indicate national team as defined under FIFA eligibility rules; some limited exceptions apply. Players may hold more than one non-FIFA nationality.

No.	Pos.	Nation	Player
8	MF	(Argentina) ARG	Tomás Andrade (loan return to (Argentina) River Plate)
9	MF	(Argentina) ARG	Marco Ruben (loan return to (Argentina) Rosario Central)
10	FW	(Brazil) BRA	Marcelo Cirino (free agent)
15	MF	(Brazil) BRA	Camacho (loan return to Corinthians)
17	FW	(Argentina) ARG	Braian Romero (loan return to (Argentina) Independiente)
23	DF	(Brazil) BRA	Madson (loan return to Grêmio)
25	GK	(Brazil) BRA	Caio (on loan to Água Santa)
38	MF	(Brazil) BRA	Thonny Anderson (loan return to Grêmio)
77	MF	(Brazil) BRA	Bruno Nazário (loan return to (Germany) TSG Hoffenheim)
97	MF	(Brazil) BRA	Everton Felipe (loan return to São Paulo)
—	DF	(Brazil) BRA	Pedro Henrique (loan return to Corinthians)
—	FW	(Brazil) BRA	Bruno Rodrigues (to Tombense)
—	FW	(Brazil) BRA	Crysan (to (Portugal) Santa Clara)
—	FW	(Brazil) BRA	Gabriel Poveda (free agent)
—	MF	(Brazil) BRA	João Pedro (on loan to Atlético Goianiense, previously on loan at Paraná)

=== Atlético Goianiense ===
In: Note: Flags indicate national team as defined under FIFA eligibility rules; some limited exceptions apply. Players may hold more than one non-FIFA nationality.

No.	Pos.	Nation	Player
—	FW	(Brazil) BRA	Zé Roberto (on loan from Mirassol, previously on loan at São Bento)
—	FW	(Brazil) BRA	Júlio César (on loan from Chapecoense, previously on loan at Botafogo-SP)
—	MF	(Brazil) BRA	Edson (from Ponte Preta)
—	MF	(Brazil) BRA	Caio Vinícius (on loan from Fluminense)
—	MF	(Brazil) BRA	Matheus Vargas (on loan from Fortaleza)
—	FW	(Brazil) BRA	Renato Kayzer (on loan from Cruzeiro, previously on loan at Chapecoense)
—	FW	(Brazil) BRA	Dudu (on loan from Internacional)
—	MF	(Brazil) BRA	Gustavo Ferrareis (on loan from Internacional, previously on loan at Avaí)
—	MF	(Brazil) BRA	João Pedro (on loan from Athletico Paranaense, previously on loan at Paraná)
—	MF	(Brazil) BRA	Marlon Freitas (free agent, previously at Botafogo-SP)

Out: Note: Flags indicate national team as defined under FIFA eligibility rules; some limited exceptions apply. Players may hold more than one non-FIFA nationality.

No.	Pos.	Nation	Player

=== Atlético Mineiro ===
In: Note: Flags indicate national team as defined under FIFA eligibility rules; some limited exceptions apply. Players may hold more than one non-FIFA nationality.

No.	Pos.	Nation	Player
—	DF	(Brazil) BRA	Maílton (from Mirassol, previously on loan at Operário)
—	MF	(Brazil) BRA	Edinho (loan return from Fortaleza)

Out: Note: Flags indicate national team as defined under FIFA eligibility rules; some limited exceptions apply. Players may hold more than one non-FIFA nationality.

No.	Pos.	Nation	Player
3	DF	(Brazil) BRA	Leonardo Silva (retired)
7	MF	(Brazil) BRA	Elias (free agent)
8	FW	(Colombia) COL	Yimmi Chará (to (United States) Portland Timbers)
27	FW	(Brazil) BRA	Luan (to (Japan) V-Varen Nagasaki)
44	FW	(Brazil) BRA	Alerrandro (to Red Bull Bragantino)
49	FW	(Brazil) BRA	Geuvânio (free agent)
84	GK	(Brazil) BRA	Wilson (loan return to Coritiba)
—	DF	(Brazil) BRA	Jesiel (to (Japan) Kawasaki Frontale, previously on loan)

=== Bahia ===
In: Note: Flags indicate national team as defined under FIFA eligibility rules; some limited exceptions apply. Players may hold more than one non-FIFA nationality.

No.	Pos.	Nation	Player
—	MF	(Brazil) BRA	Daniel (free agent, previously at Fluminense)
—	MF	(Brazil) BRA	Jadson (on loan from Cruzeiro)
—	MF	(Brazil) BRA	Ramon (on loan from Internacional, previously on loan at Villa Nova)
—	GK	(Brazil) BRA	Mateus Claus (on loan from Pelotas)

Out: Note: Flags indicate national team as defined under FIFA eligibility rules; some limited exceptions apply. Players may hold more than one non-FIFA nationality.

No.	Pos.	Nation	Player
11	FW	(Brazil) BRA	Lucca (loan return to Corinthians)
18	MF	(Venezuela) VEN	Alejandro Guerra (loan return to Palmeiras)
22	DF	(Brazil) BRA	Ezequiel (loan return to Fluminense)
27	MF	(Brazil) BRA	Shaylon (loan return to São Paulo)
98	FW	(Brazil) BRA	Artur (loan return to Palmeiras)

=== Botafogo ===
In: Note: Flags indicate national team as defined under FIFA eligibility rules; some limited exceptions apply. Players may hold more than one non-FIFA nationality.

No.	Pos.	Nation	Player
—	FW	(Brazil) BRA	Pedro Raúl (on loan from (Portugal) Vitória de Guimarães, previously on loan at Atlético Goianiense)
—	FW	(Peru) PER	Alexander Lecaros (from (Peru) Real Garcilaso)
—	DF	(Brazil) BRA	Ruan Renato (on loan from Vitória, previously on loan at Figueirense)
—	MF	(Brazil) BRA	Thiaguinho (on loan from Corinthians, previously on loan at Oeste)
—	DF	(Brazil) BRA	Guilherme Santos (on loan from Tombense, previously on loan at Paraná)
—	MF	(Brazil) BRA	Bruno Nazário (on loan from (Germany) TSG Hoffenheim, previously on loan at Athletico Paranaense)
—	MF	(Brazil) BRA	Luiz Otávio (on loan from Tombense, previously on loan at Paraná)

Out: Note: Flags indicate national team as defined under FIFA eligibility rules; some limited exceptions apply. Players may hold more than one non-FIFA nationality.

No.	Pos.	Nation	Player
2	DF	(Brazil) BRA	Gabriel (loan return to Atlético Mineiro)
6	DF	(Brazil) BRA	Gilson (free agent)
7	FW	(Brazil) BRA	Diego Souza (loan return to São Paulo)
15	MF	(Brazil) BRA	Jean (loan return to Corinthians)
17	FW	(Brazil) BRA	Rodrigo Pimpão (free agent)
19	MF	(Brazil) BRA	Alan Santos (loan return to (Mexico) Tigres UANL)
20	MF	(Chile) CHI	Leonardo Valencia (to (Chile) Colo-Colo)
27	MF	(Brazil) BRA	Rickson (on loan to América Mineiro)
—	FW	(Brazil) BRA	Ezequiel (to (Japan) Sanfrecce Hiroshima, previously on loan at Cruzeiro)
—	DF	(Brazil) BRA	Arnaldo (free agent, previously on loan at Ponte Preta)
—	FW	(Brazil) BRA	Kieza (free agent, previously on loan at Fortaleza)
—	FW	(Brazil) BRA	Renan Gorne (free agent, previously on loan at Confiança)
—	DF	(Brazil) BRA	Victor Lindenberg (free agent, previously on loan at Santa Cruz)

=== Ceará ===
In: Note: Flags indicate national team as defined under FIFA eligibility rules; some limited exceptions apply. Players may hold more than one non-FIFA nationality.

No.	Pos.	Nation	Player
—	DF	(Brazil) BRA	Tiago (on loan from (Argentina) Lanús)
—	DF	(Brazil) BRA	Eduardo (on loan from Chapecoense)
—	MF	(Brazil) BRA	Charles (from Internacional, previously on loan at Sport Recife)
—	FW	(Brazil) BRA	Rodrigão (on loan from Santos)
—	DF	(Brazil) BRA	Bruno Pacheco (from Chapecoense)
—	FW	(Brazil) BRA	Rafael Sóbis (free agent, previously at Internacional)
—	DF	(Brazil) BRA	Willian Klaus (free agent, previously at Internacional)
—	FW	(Brazil) BRA	Rogério (on loan from Bahia)
—	GK	(Brazil) BRA	Fernando Prass (free agent, previously at Palmeiras)

Out: Note: Flags indicate national team as defined under FIFA eligibility rules; some limited exceptions apply. Players may hold more than one non-FIFA nationality.

No.	Pos.	Nation	Player
45	MF	(Brazil) BRA	Lima (loan return to Grêmio)
70	FW	(Brazil) BRA	Romário (free agent)
89	MF	(Brazil) BRA	Thiago Galhardo (free agent)
98	FW	(Brazil) BRA	Felippe Cardoso (loan return to Santos)

=== Corinthians ===
In: Note: Flags indicate national team as defined under FIFA eligibility rules; some limited exceptions apply. Players may hold more than one non-FIFA nationality.

No.	Pos.	Nation	Player
—	FW	(Brazil) BRA	Luan (from Grêmio)
—	MF	(Colombia) COL	Víctor Cantillo (from (Colombia) Junior)
—	FW	(Brazil) BRA	Matheus Davó (from Guarani)
—	DF	(Brazil) BRA	Sidcley (on loan from (Ukraine) Dynamo Kyiv)

Out: Note: Flags indicate national team as defined under FIFA eligibility rules; some limited exceptions apply. Players may hold more than one non-FIFA nationality.

No.	Pos.	Nation	Player
8	MF	(Brazil) BRA	Renê Júnior (on loan to Coritiba)
30	MF	(Brazil) BRA	Júnior Urso (to (United States) Orlando City)
—	FW	(Brazil) BRA	Lucca (to (Qatar) Al-Khor, previously on loan at Bahia)

=== Coritiba ===
In: Note: Flags indicate national team as defined under FIFA eligibility rules; some limited exceptions apply. Players may hold more than one non-FIFA nationality.

No.	Pos.	Nation	Player
—	DF	(Brazil) BRA	Rodolfo (free agent, previously at Paraná)
—	GK	(Brazil) BRA	César (on loan from Londrina)
—	DF	(Brazil) BRA	Lucas Ramon (from Red Bull Bragantino)
—	DF	(Brazil) BRA	Nathan (from Atlético Goianiense)
—	MF	(Brazil) BRA	Gabriel (free agent, previously on loan at (Japan) Kashiwa Reysol from Flamengo)
—	MF	(Brazil) BRA	Renê Júnior (on loan from Corinthians)

Out: Note: Flags indicate national team as defined under FIFA eligibility rules; some limited exceptions apply. Players may hold more than one non-FIFA nationality.

No.	Pos.	Nation	Player

=== Flamengo ===
In: Note: Flags indicate national team as defined under FIFA eligibility rules; some limited exceptions apply. Players may hold more than one non-FIFA nationality.

No.	Pos.	Nation	Player
—	FW	(Brazil) BRA	Thiago (from Náutico)
—	FW	(Brazil) BRA	Pedro Rocha (on loan from (Russia) Spartak Moscow, previously on loan at Cruzeiro)
—	DF	(Brazil) BRA	Gustavo Henrique (free agent, previously at Santos)
—	FW	(Brazil) BRA	Michael (from Goiás)
—	MF	(Brazil) BRA	Thiago Maia (on loan from (France) Lille)
—	FW	(Brazil) BRA	Pedro (on loan from (Italy) Fiorentina)
—	FW	(Brazil) BRA	Gabriel Barbosa (from (Italy) Inter Milan, previously on loan)

Out: Note: Flags indicate national team as defined under FIFA eligibility rules; some limited exceptions apply. Players may hold more than one non-FIFA nationality.

No.	Pos.	Nation	Player
2	DF	(Brazil) BRA	Rodinei (on loan to Internacional)
19	MF	(Brazil) BRA	Reinier (to (Spain) Real Madrid)
44	DF	(Brazil) BRA	Rhodolfo (free agent, to Coritiba)
54	FW	(Brazil) BRA	Vitor Gabriel (on loan to (Portugal) Braga)
—	MF	(Brazil) BRA	Matheus Sávio (to (Japan) Kashiwa Reysol, previously on loan)
—	MF	(Brazil) BRA	Rômulo (free agent, previously on loan at Grêmio)
—	MF	(Brazil) BRA	Gabriel (free agent, previously on loan at (Japan) Kashiwa Reysol)

=== Fluminense ===
In: Note: Flags indicate national team as defined under FIFA eligibility rules; some limited exceptions apply. Players may hold more than one non-FIFA nationality.

No.	Pos.	Nation	Player
—	MF	(Brazil) BRA	Yago Felipe (from Vitória, previously on loan at Goiás)
—	FW	(Brazil) BRA	Caio Paulista (on loan from Tombense)
—	FW	(Brazil) BRA	Felippe Cardoso (on loan from Santos, previously on loan at Ceará)

Out: Note: Flags indicate national team as defined under FIFA eligibility rules; some limited exceptions apply. Players may hold more than one non-FIFA nationality.

No.	Pos.	Nation	Player
5	MF	(Brazil) BRA	Airton (free agent)
11	FW	(Colombia) COL	Yony González (free agent)
18	FW	(Brazil) BRA	Wellington Nem (loan return to (Ukraine) Shakhtar Donetsk)
19	DF	(Brazil) BRA	Caio Henrique (loan return to (Spain) Atlético Madrid)
20	MF	(Brazil) BRA	Daniel (free agent)
23	FW	(Brazil) BRA	João Pedro (to (England) Watford)
25	GK	(Brazil) BRA	Agenor (free agent)
28	MF	(Brazil) BRA	Guilherme (loan return to Corinthians)
30	FW	(Brazil) BRA	Brenner (loan return to São Paulo)
34	MF	(Brazil) BRA	Caio Vinícius (on loan to Atlético Goianiense)
35	FW	(Brazil) BRA	Ewandro (loan return to (Italy) Udinese)
—	FW	(Brazil) BRA	Lucas Fernandes (to (Japan) Consadole Sapporo, previously on loan)

=== Fortaleza ===
In: Note: Flags indicate national team as defined under FIFA eligibility rules; some limited exceptions apply. Players may hold more than one non-FIFA nationality.

No.	Pos.	Nation	Player
—	FW	(Brazil) BRA	Edson Cariús (free agent, previously at CRB)

Out: Note: Flags indicate national team as defined under FIFA eligibility rules; some limited exceptions apply. Players may hold more than one non-FIFA nationality.

No.	Pos.	Nation	Player
—	MF	(Brazil) BRA	Edinho (loan return to Atlético Mineiro)
—	MF	(Brazil) BRA	Matheus Vargas (on loan to Atlético Goianiense)
—	MF	(Brazil) BRA	Diego Tavares (to São Bento)
—	DF	(Brazil) BRA	Adalberto (to Villa Nova)

=== Goiás ===
In: Note: Flags indicate national team as defined under FIFA eligibility rules; some limited exceptions apply. Players may hold more than one non-FIFA nationality.

No.	Pos.	Nation	Player
—	FW	(Brazil) BRA	Lucão (from Fluminense)
—	FW	(Brazil) BRA	Henrique Almeida (free agent, previously at Grêmio)
—	DF	(Brazil) BRA	Vidal (from Juventude)

Out: Note: Flags indicate national team as defined under FIFA eligibility rules; some limited exceptions apply. Players may hold more than one non-FIFA nationality.

No.	Pos.	Nation	Player
5	MF	(Brazil) BRA	Geovane (free agent)
6	MF	(Brazil) BRA	Yago Felipe (loan return to Vitória)
—	FW	(Uruguay) URU	Leandro Barcia (free agent)

=== Grêmio ===
In: Note: Flags indicate national team as defined under FIFA eligibility rules; some limited exceptions apply. Players may hold more than one non-FIFA nationality.

No.	Pos.	Nation	Player
2	DF	(Brazil) BRA	Victor Ferraz (from Santos)
10	MF	(Brazil) BRA	Thiago Neves (free agent, previously at Cruzeiro)
16	MF	(Brazil) BRA	Lucas Silva (free agent, previously at (Spain) Real Madrid)
17	DF	(Colombia) COL	Luis Orejuela (on loan from Cruzeiro)
19	DF	(Brazil) BRA	Caio Henrique (on loan from (Spain) Atlético de Madrid)
27	GK	(Brazil) BRA	Vanderlei (from Santos)
29	FW	(Brazil) BRA	Diego Souza (free agent, previously at Botafogo)

Out: Note: Flags indicate national team as defined under FIFA eligibility rules; some limited exceptions apply. Players may hold more than one non-FIFA nationality.

No.	Pos.	Nation	Player
2	DF	(Brazil) BRA	Léo Moura (free agent)
5	MF	(Brazil) BRA	Michel (on loan to Fortaleza)
7	FW	(Brazil) BRA	Luan (to Corinthians)
9	FW	(Brazil) BRA	Diego Tardelli (released)
10	FW	(Brazil) BRA	Felipe Vizeu (loan return to (Italy) Udinese)
13	MF	(Brazil) BRA	Rômulo (loan return to Flamengo)
19	DF	(Brazil) BRA	Caio Henrique (loan return to (Spain) Atlético de Madrid)
29	DF	(Brazil) BRA	Juninho Capixaba (on loan to Bahia)
42	DF	(Brazil) BRA	Rafael Galhardo (loan return to Vasco)
45	MF	(Brazil) BRA	Frizzo (on loan to Atlético Goianiense)
—	DF	(Brazil) BRA	Madson (to Santos, previously on loan at Athletico Paranaense)
—	DF	(Brazil) BRA	Rafael Thyere (on loan to Sport, previously on loan)
—	MF	(Brazil) BRA	Kaio (on loan to Paraná, previously on loan at Sport)
—	MF	(Brazil) BRA	Lima (on loan to Ceará, previously on loan)
—	MF	(Brazil) BRA	Thonny Anderson (to Red Bull Bragantino, previously on loan at Athletico Paranaense)
—	FW	(Brazil) BRA	Guilherme (to (Saudi Arabia) Al-Faisaly, previously on loan at Sport)
—	FW	(Brazil) BRA	Henrique Almeida (free agent, previously on loan at Chapecoense)
—	FW	(Brazil) BRA	Vico (to Vitória, previously on loan at Ponte Preta)

=== Internacional ===
In: Note: Flags indicate national team as defined under FIFA eligibility rules; some limited exceptions apply. Players may hold more than one non-FIFA nationality.

No.	Pos.	Nation	Player
—	DF	(Brazil) BRA	Rodinei (on loan from Flamengo)
—	MF	(Argentina) ARG	Damián Musto (on loan from (Spain) Huesca)
—	MF	(Brazil) BRA	Thiago Galhardo (free agent, previously at Ceará)

Out: Note: Flags indicate national team as defined under FIFA eligibility rules; some limited exceptions apply. Players may hold more than one non-FIFA nationality.

No.	Pos.	Nation	Player
2	DF	(Brazil) BRA	Bruno Vieira (free agent)
7	FW	(Uruguay) URU	Nico López (to (Mexico) Tigres UANL)
16	MF	(Brazil) BRA	Francisco Rithely (loan return to Sport Recife)
20	DF	(Brazil) BRA	Emerson Santos (loan return to Palmeiras)
21	MF	(Brazil) BRA	Bruno Silva (to Avaí)
22	FW	(Colombia) COL	Santiago Tréllez (loan return to São Paulo)
23	FW	(Brazil) BRA	Rafael Sóbis (to Ceará)
25	MF	(Brazil) BRA	Matheus Galdezani (loan return to Coritiba)
27	DF	(Brazil) BRA	Dudu (on loan to Atlético Goianiense)
41	FW	(Brazil) BRA	Pedro Lucas (on loan to Figueirense)
77	FW	(Brazil) BRA	Guilherme Parede (loan return to Coritiba)
—	MF	(Brazil) BRA	Ramon (on loan to Bahia, previously on loan at Villa Nova)
—	GK	(Brazil) BRA	Carlos Miguel (on loan to Santa Cruz)
—	MF	(Brazil) BRA	Gustavo Ferrareis (on loan to Atlético Goianiense, previously on loan at Avaí)
—	MF	(Brazil) BRA	Valdívia (on loan to Avaí, previously on loan at Vasco da Gama)
—	MF	(Brazil) BRA	Juan Alano (to (Japan) Kashima Antlers, previously on loan at Coritiba)
—	MF	(Brazil) BRA	Charles (to Ceará, previously on loan at Sport Recife)
—	MF	(Brazil) BRA	Thales (on loan to Paraná, previously on loan at Vitória)

=== Palmeiras ===
In: Note: Flags indicate national team as defined under FIFA eligibility rules; some limited exceptions apply. Players may hold more than one non-FIFA nationality.

No.	Pos.	Nation	Player

Out: Note: Flags indicate national team as defined under FIFA eligibility rules; some limited exceptions apply. Players may hold more than one non-FIFA nationality.

No.	Pos.	Nation	Player
1	GK	(Brazil) BRA	Fernando Prass (free agent)
3	DF	(Brazil) BRA	Edu Dracena (retired)
5	MF	(Brazil) BRA	Thiago Santos (to (United States) FC Dallas)
9	FW	(Colombia) COL	Miguel Borja (on loan to (Colombia) Junior)
25	DF	(Brazil) BRA	Antônio Carlos (on loan to (United States) Orlando City)
27	FW	(Brazil) BRA	Henrique Dourado (loan return to (China) Henan Jianye)

=== Red Bull Bragantino ===
In: Note: Flags indicate national team as defined under FIFA eligibility rules; some limited exceptions apply. Players may hold more than one non-FIFA nationality.

No.	Pos.	Nation	Player
—	FW	(Brazil) BRA	Alerrandro (from Atlético Mineiro)
—	DF	(Ecuador) ECU	Leonardo Realpe (from (Ecuador) Independiente del Valle)
—	MF	(Brazil) BRA	Matheus Jesus (on loan from Corinthians)
—	DF	(Brazil) BRA	Luan Cândido (on loan from (Germany) RB Leipzig)

Out: Note: Flags indicate national team as defined under FIFA eligibility rules; some limited exceptions apply. Players may hold more than one non-FIFA nationality.

No.	Pos.	Nation	Player
25	FW	(Brazil) BRA	Thiago Ribeiro (to Novorizontino)
33	DF	(Brazil) BRA	Anderson Marques (retired)
35	DF	(Brazil) BRA	Rafael Carioca (to Vitória)

=== Santos ===
In: Note: Flags indicate national team as defined under FIFA eligibility rules; some limited exceptions apply. Players may hold more than one non-FIFA nationality.

No.	Pos.	Nation	Player
—	FW	(Brazil) BRA	Raniel (from São Paulo)
—	DF	(Brazil) BRA	Madson (from Grêmio, previously on loan at Athletico Paranaense)

Out: Note: Flags indicate national team as defined under FIFA eligibility rules; some limited exceptions apply. Players may hold more than one non-FIFA nationality.

No.	Pos.	Nation	Player
3	DF	(Brazil) BRA	Jorge (loan return to (France) Monaco)
4	DF	(Brazil) BRA	Victor Ferraz (to Grêmio)
6	DF	(Brazil) BRA	Gustavo Henrique (to Flamengo)
—	MF	(Brazil) BRA	Vitor Bueno (to São Paulo, previously on loan)
—	FW	(Brazil) BRA	Lucas Braga (on loan to Inter de Limeira, previously on loan at Cuiabá)
—	FW	(Brazil) BRA	Rodrigão (on loan to Ceará, previously on loan at Coritiba)

=== São Paulo ===
In: Note: Flags indicate national team as defined under FIFA eligibility rules; some limited exceptions apply. Players may hold more than one non-FIFA nationality.

No.	Pos.	Nation	Player
2	DF	(Brazil) BRA	Igor Vinícius (from Ituano, previously on loan)
12	MF	(Brazil) BRA	Vitor Bueno (from Santos, previously on loan)
23	GK	(Brazil) BRA	Tiago Volpi (from (Mexico) Querétaro, previously on loan)

Out: Note: Flags indicate national team as defined under FIFA eligibility rules; some limited exceptions apply. Players may hold more than one non-FIFA nationality.

No.	Pos.	Nation	Player
—	FW	(Brazil) BRA	Raniel (to Santos)
—	MF	(Brazil) BRA	Thomaz (on loan to Inter de Limeira, previously on loan at (Bolivia) Bolívar)
—	GK	(Brazil) BRA	Jean (free agent)

=== Sport Recife ===
In: Note: Flags indicate national team as defined under FIFA eligibility rules; some limited exceptions apply. Players may hold more than one non-FIFA nationality.

No.	Pos.	Nation	Player
—	FW	(Brazil) BRA	Ewandro (on loan from (Italy) Udinese)
—	GK	(Brazil) BRA	Carlos Eduardo (from Brasil de Pelotas)
—	MF	(Brazil) BRA	Betinho (from Figueirense)
—	MF	(Brazil) BRA	Jean Patrick (from Cuiabá)
—	MF	(Argentina) ARG	Lucas Mugni (from (Bolivia) Oriente Petrolero)

Out: Note: Flags indicate national team as defined under FIFA eligibility rules; some limited exceptions apply. Players may hold more than one non-FIFA nationality.

No.	Pos.	Nation	Player

=== Vasco da Gama ===
In: Note: Flags indicate national team as defined under FIFA eligibility rules; some limited exceptions apply. Players may hold more than one non-FIFA nationality.

No.	Pos.	Nation	Player
14	FW	(Argentina) ARG	Germán Cano (from (Colombia) Independiente Medellín)
10	FW	(Argentina) ARG	Martín Benítez (on loan from (Argentina) Independiente)
8	MF	(Brazil) BRA	Fellipe Bastos (free agent, previously at Vasco da Gama)

Out: Note: Flags indicate national team as defined under FIFA eligibility rules; some limited exceptions apply. Players may hold more than one non-FIFA nationality.

No.	Pos.	Nation	Player
2	FW	(Paraguay) PAR	Raúl Cáceres (loan return to (Paraguay) Cerro Porteño)
3	DF	(Colombia) COL	Oswaldo Henríquez (free agent)
6	MF	(Brazil) BRA	Fellipe Bastos (loan return to Corinthians)
7	MF	(Brazil) BRA	Rossi (loan return to (China) Shenzhen)
8	MF	(Brazil) BRA	Marquinho (free agent)
12	MF	(Brazil) BRA	Sidão (loan return to Goiás)
14	DF	(Brazil) BRA	Danilo Barcelos (loan return to Atlético Mineiro)
17	MF	(Brazil) BRA	Valdívia (loan return to Internacional)
20	FW	(Brazil) BRA	Clayton (loan return to Atlético Mineiro)
25	MF	(Brazil) BRA	Richard (loan return to Corinthians)
46	GK	(Brazil) BRA	João Pedro (free agent)
—	MF	(Brazil) BRA	Bruno Cosendey (on loan to CRB)
—	MF	(Brazil) BRA	Bruno Ritter (free agent)
—	FW	(Brazil) BRA	Enrico dos Santos (free agent)
—	FW	(Brazil) BRA	Bruno Henricky (free agent)

== Campeonato Brasileiro Série B ==
=== América Mineiro ===
In: Note: Flags indicate national team as defined under FIFA eligibility rules; some limited exceptions apply. Players may hold more than one non-FIFA nationality.

No.	Pos.	Nation	Player

Out: Note: Flags indicate national team as defined under FIFA eligibility rules; some limited exceptions apply. Players may hold more than one non-FIFA nationality.

No.	Pos.	Nation	Player

=== Avaí ===
In: Note: Flags indicate national team as defined under FIFA eligibility rules; some limited exceptions apply. Players may hold more than one non-FIFA nationality.

No.	Pos.	Nation	Player

Out: Note: Flags indicate national team as defined under FIFA eligibility rules; some limited exceptions apply. Players may hold more than one non-FIFA nationality.

No.	Pos.	Nation	Player

=== Botafogo-SP ===
In: Note: Flags indicate national team as defined under FIFA eligibility rules; some limited exceptions apply. Players may hold more than one non-FIFA nationality.

No.	Pos.	Nation	Player

Out: Note: Flags indicate national team as defined under FIFA eligibility rules; some limited exceptions apply. Players may hold more than one non-FIFA nationality.

No.	Pos.	Nation	Player

=== Brasil de Pelotas ===
In: Note: Flags indicate national team as defined under FIFA eligibility rules; some limited exceptions apply. Players may hold more than one non-FIFA nationality.

No.	Pos.	Nation	Player

Out: Note: Flags indicate national team as defined under FIFA eligibility rules; some limited exceptions apply. Players may hold more than one non-FIFA nationality.

No.	Pos.	Nation	Player

=== Chapecoense ===
In: Note: Flags indicate national team as defined under FIFA eligibility rules; some limited exceptions apply. Players may hold more than one non-FIFA nationality.

No.	Pos.	Nation	Player

Out: Note: Flags indicate national team as defined under FIFA eligibility rules; some limited exceptions apply. Players may hold more than one non-FIFA nationality.

No.	Pos.	Nation	Player

=== Confiança ===
In: Note: Flags indicate national team as defined under FIFA eligibility rules; some limited exceptions apply. Players may hold more than one non-FIFA nationality.

No.	Pos.	Nation	Player

Out: Note: Flags indicate national team as defined under FIFA eligibility rules; some limited exceptions apply. Players may hold more than one non-FIFA nationality.

No.	Pos.	Nation	Player

=== CRB ===
In: Note: Flags indicate national team as defined under FIFA eligibility rules; some limited exceptions apply. Players may hold more than one non-FIFA nationality.

No.	Pos.	Nation	Player

Out: Note: Flags indicate national team as defined under FIFA eligibility rules; some limited exceptions apply. Players may hold more than one non-FIFA nationality.

No.	Pos.	Nation	Player

=== Cruzeiro ===
In: Note: Flags indicate national team as defined under FIFA eligibility rules; some limited exceptions apply. Players may hold more than one non-FIFA nationality.

No.	Pos.	Nation	Player
—	DF	(Brazil) BRA	Manoel (loan return from Corinthians)

Out: Note: Flags indicate national team as defined under FIFA eligibility rules; some limited exceptions apply. Players may hold more than one non-FIFA nationality.

No.	Pos.	Nation	Player
—	FW	(Brazil) BRA	Pedro Rocha (loan return to (Russia) Spartak Moscow)
17	FW	(Brazil) BRA	Ezequiel (loan return to Botafogo)
—	DF	(Brazil) BRA	Luiz Gustavo (on loan to Villa Nova)
—	MF	(Brazil) BRA	Michel (on loan to Villa Nova)
—	FW	(Brazil) BRA	Zé Eduardo (on loan to Villa Nova)
—	MF	(Brazil) BRA	Jadson (on loan to Bahia)
—	FW	(Uruguay) URU	Gonzalo Latorre (free agent)
—	DF	(Brazil) BRA	Patrick Brey (on loan to (Cyprus) APOEL, previously on loan at Coritiba)
—	FW	(Cameroon) CMR	Joel (on loan to (Portugal) Marítimo)
—	FW	(Brazil) BRA	Renato Kayzer (on loan to Atlético Goianiense, previously on loan at Chapecoense)

=== CSA ===
In: Note: Flags indicate national team as defined under FIFA eligibility rules; some limited exceptions apply. Players may hold more than one non-FIFA nationality.

No.	Pos.	Nation	Player

Out: Note: Flags indicate national team as defined under FIFA eligibility rules; some limited exceptions apply. Players may hold more than one non-FIFA nationality.

No.	Pos.	Nation	Player

=== Cuiabá ===
In: Note: Flags indicate national team as defined under FIFA eligibility rules; some limited exceptions apply. Players may hold more than one non-FIFA nationality.

No.	Pos.	Nation	Player

Out: Note: Flags indicate national team as defined under FIFA eligibility rules; some limited exceptions apply. Players may hold more than one non-FIFA nationality.

No.	Pos.	Nation	Player

=== Figueirense ===
In: Note: Flags indicate national team as defined under FIFA eligibility rules; some limited exceptions apply. Players may hold more than one non-FIFA nationality.

No.	Pos.	Nation	Player

Out: Note: Flags indicate national team as defined under FIFA eligibility rules; some limited exceptions apply. Players may hold more than one non-FIFA nationality.

No.	Pos.	Nation	Player

=== Guarani ===
In: Note: Flags indicate national team as defined under FIFA eligibility rules; some limited exceptions apply. Players may hold more than one non-FIFA nationality.

No.	Pos.	Nation	Player

Out: Note: Flags indicate national team as defined under FIFA eligibility rules; some limited exceptions apply. Players may hold more than one non-FIFA nationality.

No.	Pos.	Nation	Player

=== Juventude ===
In: Note: Flags indicate national team as defined under FIFA eligibility rules; some limited exceptions apply. Players may hold more than one non-FIFA nationality.

No.	Pos.	Nation	Player

Out: Note: Flags indicate national team as defined under FIFA eligibility rules; some limited exceptions apply. Players may hold more than one non-FIFA nationality.

No.	Pos.	Nation	Player

=== Náutico ===
In: Note: Flags indicate national team as defined under FIFA eligibility rules; some limited exceptions apply. Players may hold more than one non-FIFA nationality.

No.	Pos.	Nation	Player

Out: Note: Flags indicate national team as defined under FIFA eligibility rules; some limited exceptions apply. Players may hold more than one non-FIFA nationality.

No.	Pos.	Nation	Player

=== Oeste ===
In: Note: Flags indicate national team as defined under FIFA eligibility rules; some limited exceptions apply. Players may hold more than one non-FIFA nationality.

No.	Pos.	Nation	Player

Out: Note: Flags indicate national team as defined under FIFA eligibility rules; some limited exceptions apply. Players may hold more than one non-FIFA nationality.

No.	Pos.	Nation	Player

=== Operário Ferroviário ===
In: Note: Flags indicate national team as defined under FIFA eligibility rules; some limited exceptions apply. Players may hold more than one non-FIFA nationality.

No.	Pos.	Nation	Player

Out: Note: Flags indicate national team as defined under FIFA eligibility rules; some limited exceptions apply. Players may hold more than one non-FIFA nationality.

No.	Pos.	Nation	Player

=== Paraná ===
In: Note: Flags indicate national team as defined under FIFA eligibility rules; some limited exceptions apply. Players may hold more than one non-FIFA nationality.

No.	Pos.	Nation	Player

Out: Note: Flags indicate national team as defined under FIFA eligibility rules; some limited exceptions apply. Players may hold more than one non-FIFA nationality.

No.	Pos.	Nation	Player

=== Ponte Preta ===
In: Note: Flags indicate national team as defined under FIFA eligibility rules; some limited exceptions apply. Players may hold more than one non-FIFA nationality.

No.	Pos.	Nation	Player

Out: Note: Flags indicate national team as defined under FIFA eligibility rules; some limited exceptions apply. Players may hold more than one non-FIFA nationality.

No.	Pos.	Nation	Player

=== Sampaio Corrêa ===
In: Note: Flags indicate national team as defined under FIFA eligibility rules; some limited exceptions apply. Players may hold more than one non-FIFA nationality.

No.	Pos.	Nation	Player

Out: Note: Flags indicate national team as defined under FIFA eligibility rules; some limited exceptions apply. Players may hold more than one non-FIFA nationality.

No.	Pos.	Nation	Player

=== Vitória ===
In: Note: Flags indicate national team as defined under FIFA eligibility rules; some limited exceptions apply. Players may hold more than one non-FIFA nationality.

No.	Pos.	Nation	Player

Out: Note: Flags indicate national team as defined under FIFA eligibility rules; some limited exceptions apply. Players may hold more than one non-FIFA nationality.

No.	Pos.	Nation	Player
