= 2020–21 S.L. Benfica season =

Benfica
2020–21 season
- President: Luís Filipe Vieira
- Head coach: Jorge Jesus
- Stadium: Estádio da Luz
- Primeira Liga: 3rd
- Taça de Portugal: Runners-up
- Taça da Liga: Semi-finals
- Supertaça Cândido de Oliveira: Runners-up
- UEFA Champions League: Third qualifying round
- UEFA Europa League: Round of 32
- Top goalscorer: League: Haris Seferovic (22); All: Haris Seferovic (26)
- Highest home attendance: 4,750 v Standard Liège (29 October 2020)
- Lowest home attendance: 0 (no spectators allowed)
- Average home league attendance: 0 (no spectators allowed)
- Biggest win: Benfica 5–0 Paços de Ferreira (10 April 2021)
- Biggest defeat: Boavista 3–0 Benfica (2 November 2020)
Home colours	Away colours	Third colours

The 2020–21 Sport Lisboa e Benfica season was the club's 117th season in existence and its 87th consecutive season in the top flight of Portuguese football. This season, Benfica invested €105 million amid the COVID-19 pandemic, a record investment in Portuguese football. Domestically, Benfica lost the Supertaça Cândido de Oliveira match, were eliminated in the semi-finals of the Taça da Liga, finished third in the Primeira Liga – their worst league position since 2008–09 – and lost a Taça de Portugal final for a second time in a row. Internationally, Benfica were eliminated in the UEFA Champions League third qualifying round and in the round of 32 of the UEFA Europa League, respectively. The season started on 18 September 2020 and concluded on 23 May 2021. Considered a failed, disastrous season, it was the first time Benfica ended trophyless since 2012–13.

== Players ==
=== First-team squad ===
As of 13 February 2021

Note: Flags indicate national team as defined under FIFA eligibility rules; some limited exceptions apply. Players may hold more than one non-FIFA nationality.

No.	Pos.	Nation	Player
1	GK	BEL	Mile Svilar
2	DF	BRA	Gilberto
3	DF	ESP	Álex Grimaldo
4	DF	BRA	Lucas Veríssimo
5	DF	BEL	Jan Vertonghen
7	MF	BRA	Everton
8	MF	BRA	Gabriel
9	FW	URU	Darwin Núñez
10	FW	GER	Luca Waldschmidt
11	MF	ARG	Franco Cervi
14	FW	SUI	Haris Seferovic
17	MF	POR	Diogo Gonçalves
19	MF	POR	Chiquinho

No.	Pos.	Nation	Player
21	MF	POR	Pizzi
22	MF	GRE	Andreas Samaris
27	MF	POR	Rafa Silva
28	MF	GER	Julian Weigl
30	DF	ARG	Nicolás Otamendi
33	DF	BRA	Jardel (captain)
34	DF	POR	André Almeida (vice-captain)
38	MF	BRA	Pedrinho
49	MF	MAR	Adel Taarabt
71	DF	POR	Nuno Tavares
77	GK	BRA	Helton Leite
88	FW	POR	Gonçalo Ramos
99	GK	GRE	Odysseas Vlachodimos

== Transfers ==
=== In ===
No.	Pos	Player	Transferred from	Fee	Date	Source
38	MF	(Brazil) Pedrinho	(Brazil) Corinthians	€17,098,000	3 August 2020	
2	DF	(Brazil) Gilberto	(Brazil) Fluminense	€3,000,000	8 August 2020	
77	GK	(Brazil) Helton Leite	(Portugal) Boavista	Undisclosed	8 August 2020	
5	DF	(Belgium) Jan Vertonghen	(England) Tottenham Hotspur	Free	14 August 2020	
7	FW	(Brazil) Everton	(Brazil) Grêmio	€22,005,000	14 August 2020	
10	MF	(Germany) Luca Waldschmidt	(Germany) Freiburg	€16,017,000	14 August 2020	
9	FW	(Uruguay) Darwin Núñez	(Spain) Almería	€25,020,000	4 September 2020	
30	DF	(Argentina) Nicolás Otamendi	(England) Manchester City	€15,158,000	29 September 2020	
4	DF	(Brazil) Lucas Veríssimo	(Brazil) Santos	€6,500,000	10 February 2021	
Disclosed total
€104,798,000

=== Out ===
No.	Pos	Player	Transferred to	Fee	Date	Source(s)
—	GK	(Portugal) Bruno Varela	(Portugal) Vitória de Guimarães	Free	19 August 2020	
—	FW	(Colombia) Yony González	(United States) LA Galaxy	Loan	19 August 2020	
—	DF	(Nigeria) Tyronne Ebuehi	(Netherlands) Twente	Loan	21 August 2020	
—	GK	(Russia) Ivan Zlobin	(Portugal) Famalicão	Undisclosed	22 August 2020	
—	MF	(Serbia) Andrija Živković	(Greece) PAOK	Released	26 August 2020	
—	FW	(Venezuela) Jhonder Cádiz	(United States) Nashville SC	Loan (€500,000)	9 September 2020	
—	DF	(Portugal) Pedro Pereira	(Italy) Crotone	Loan	21 September 2020	
—	MF	(Portugal) David Tavares	(Portugal) Moreirense	Loan	22 September 2020	
—	MF	(Serbia) Ljubomir Fejsa	(Saudi Arabia) Al-Ahli	Released	24 September 2020	
—	MF	(Portugal) Florentino	(France) Monaco	Loan	25 September 2020	
6	DF	(Portugal) Rúben Dias	(England) Manchester City	€68,000,000	30 September 2020	
—	DF	(Argentina) Cristian Lema	(Saudi Arabia) Damac FC	€2,000,000	2 October 2020	
95	FW	(Brazil) Carlos Vinícius	(England) Tottenham Hotspur	Loan (€3,000,000)	2 October 2020	
84	DF	(Portugal) Tomás Tavares	(Spain) Alavés	Loan	3 October 2020	
97	DF	(Portugal) Ferro	(Spain) Valencia	Loan	31 January 2021	
Disclosed total
€73,500,000

== Pre-season friendlies ==
Win Draw Loss

30 August 2020 Friendly	Benfica	2–1	Bournemouth	Lisbon, Portugal
19:00 WEST	Taarabt 14'; Everton 21'	Report	Danjuma 17'	Stadium: Estádio da Luz; Attendance: 0 Referee: António Nobre (Leiria)

2 September 2020 Friendly	Benfica	2–1	Braga	Lisbon, Portugal
19:00 WEST	Taarabt (yellow card) 41' (yellow-red card) 69'; Vinícius 56', 90+3'	Report	Paulinho 31'; A. Horta (yellow card) 45+1'; Gaitán (yellow card) 70'	Stadium: Estádio da Luz; Attendance: 0 Referee: André Narciso (Setúbal, first half), Hugo Silva (Santarém, second half)

5 September 2020 Friendly	Benfica	2–0	Rennes	Lisbon, Portugal
19:00 WEST	Pizzi 33' (pen.); Gabriel 64'	Report		Stadium: Estádio da Luz; Attendance: 0 Referee: Hugo Silva (Santarém, first half), Fábio Melo (Porto, second half)

Non-televised friendlies, at Benfica Campus:

- Benfica 4–0 Benfica B/U23 (15 August)
- Benfica 4–1 Estoril (22 August)
- Benfica 4–0 Belenenses SAD (25 August)
- Benfica 5–1 Farense (26 August)
- Benfica 3–0 Benfica B (6 September)

== Competitions ==
=== Overview ===
Competition	First match	Last match	Starting round	Final position	Record							
Competition	First match	Last match	Starting round	Final position	Pld	W	D	L	GF	GA	GD	Win %
Primeira Liga	18 September 2020	19 May 2021	Matchday 1	3rd	34	23	7	4	69	27	+42	67.65
Taça de Portugal	21 November 2020	23 May 2021	Third round	Runners-up	7	6	0	1	18	3	+15	85.71
Taça da Liga	16 December 2020	20 January 2021	Quarter-finals	Semi-finals	2	0	1	1	2	3	−1	0.00
Supertaça Cândido de Oliveira	23 December 2020		Final	Runners-up	1	0	0	1	0	2	−2	0.00
Champions League	15 September 2020		Third qualifying round	Third qualifying round	1	0	0	1	1	2	−1	0.00
Europa League	22 October 2020	25 February 2021	Group stage	Round of 32	8	3	4	1	21	13	+8	37.50
Total					53	32	12	9	111	50	+61	60.38

Last updated: 23 May 2021
Source: Soccerway

=== Primeira Liga ===
==== League table ====
Pos	Team	Pld	W	D	L	GF	GA	GD	Pts	Qualification or relegation
1	Sporting CP (C)	34	26	7	1	65	20	+45	85	Qualification for the Champions League group stage
2	Porto	34	24	8	2	74	29	+45	80	Qualification for the Champions League group stage
3	Benfica	34	23	7	4	69	27	+42	76	Qualification for the Champions League third qualifying round
4	Braga	34	19	7	8	53	33	+20	64	Qualification for the Europa League group stage (Note: Braga qualified for the Europa League group stage by winning the 2020–21 Taça de Portugal. Since they would have qualified for the Europa Conference League third qualifying round by finishing fourth, the berth was awarded to the fifth-placed team (Paços de Ferreira), and the Europa Conference League second qualifying round berth reserved to the fifth-placed team was awarded to the sixth-placed team (Santa Clara).)
5	Paços de Ferreira	34	15	8	11	40	41	−1	53	Qualification for the Europa Conference League third qualifying round

Source: Liga Portugal
Rules for classification: 1) Points; 2) Head-to-head points; 3) Head-to-head goal difference; 4) Head-to-head away goals scored; 5) Goal difference; 6) Matches won; 7) Goals scored; 8) Play-off.
(C) Champions

==== Results summary ====
Overall								Home						Away					
Pld	W	D	L	GF	GA	GD	Pts	W	D	L	GF	GA	GD	W	D	L	GF	GA	GD
34	23	7	4	69	27	+42	76	12	3	2	31	15	+16	11	4	2	38	12	+26

Source: Liga Portugal

==== Results by round ====
Round	1	2	3	4	5	6	7	8	9	10	11	12	13	14	15	16	17	18	19	20	21	22	23	24	25	26	27	28	29	30	31	32	33	34
Ground	A	H	H	A	H	A	H	A	H	A	H	A	H	A	H	A	H	H	A	A	H	A	H	A	H	A	H	A	H	A	H	A	H	A
Result	W	W	W	W	W	L	L	W	W	W	W	D	W	D	D	L	D	W	D	D	W	W	W	W	W	W	L	W	W	W	D	W	W	W
Position	1	2	1	1	1	2	3	2	2	2	2	3	3	2	3	4	4	4	4	4	4	4	4	3	3	3	3	3	3	3	3	3	3	3
Position	3	6	9	12	15	15	15	18	21	24	27	28	31	32	33	33	34	37	38	39	42	45	48	51	54	57	57	60	63	66	67	70	73	76

Source: Liga Portugal
A = Away; H = Home; W = Win; D = Draw; L = Loss

==== Matches ====
The league fixtures were announced on 28 August 2020.

18 September 2020 1	Famalicão	1–5	Benfica	Vila Nova de Famalicão
19:00 WEST (UTC+01:00)	Pereira (yellow card) 45'; Rodrigues 67'	Report	Waldschmidt 19', 66'; Everton 21'; Dias (yellow card) 27'; Grimaldo 42'; Silva 52'; Gabriel (yellow card) 71'	Stadium: Estádio Municipal 22 de Junho; Attendance: 0 (Note: The match was played behind closed doors due to the COVID-19 pandemic in Europe.); Referee: Luís Godinho

26 September 2020 2	Benfica	2–0	Moreirense	Lisbon
18:30 WEST (UTC+01:00)	Dias 20'; Pizzi (yellow card) 30'; Almeida (yellow card) 60'; Seferovic 80'	Report		Stadium: Estádio da Luz; Attendance: 0 Referee: Nuno Almeida

4 October 2020 3	Benfica	3–2	Farense	Lisbon
18:30 WEST (UTC+01:00)	Pizzi 15'; Gabriel (yellow card) 50'; Otamendi (yellow card) 52'; Almeida (yellow card) 71'; Seferovic 79', 87'	Report	Nunes (yellow card) 34'; Lucca 54'; César (yellow card) 63'; Scheid (yellow card) 89'; Patrick 90+5'	Stadium: Estádio da Luz; Attendance: 0 Referee: Tiago Martins

18 October 2020 4	Rio Ave	0–3	Benfica	Vila do Conde
20:00 WEST (UTC+01:00)	Pinto (yellow card) 81'	Report	Waldschmidt 6', 45+4'; Gilberto (yellow card) 78'; Otamendi (yellow card) 80'; Gabriel 84'; Weigl (yellow card) 90+2'	Stadium: Estádio dos Arcos; Attendance: 0 Referee: João Pinheiro

26 October 2020 5	Benfica	2–0	Belenenses SAD	Lisbon
20:15 WET (UTC±00:00)	Seferovic 6'; Núñez 74'	Report		Stadium: Estádio da Luz; Attendance: 0 Referee: Rui Costa

2 November 2020 6	Boavista	3–0	Benfica	Porto
21:00 WET (UTC±00:00)	Gomes 18' (pen.); Elis 38'; Show (yellow card) 59'; Reisinho (yellow card) 65'; Hamache 76'; Jardim (yellow card) 80'	Report	Vertonghen (yellow card) 45+1'; Tavares (yellow card) 66'; Gonçalves (yellow card) 90'; Otamendi (yellow card) 90+2'	Stadium: Estádio do Bessa; Attendance: 0 Referee: Hugo Miguel

8 November 2020 7	Benfica	2–3	Braga	Lisbon
20:00 WET (UTC±00:00)	Seferovic 68', 86'; Gonçalves (yellow card) 79'	Report	Medeiros (yellow card) 11' (goal) 38'; Esgaio (yellow card) 26'; Moura 50', 63'; Sequeira (yellow card) 56'	Stadium: Estádio da Luz; Attendance: 0 Referee: Artur Soares Dias

30 November 2020 8	Marítimo	1–2	Benfica	Funchal
19:00 WET (UTC±00:00)	Pinho 14'	Report	Pizzi 32'; Everton 51' (yellow card) 66'	Stadium: Estádio do Marítimo; Attendance: 0 Referee: Manuel Mota

6 December 2020 9	Benfica	2–1	Paços de Ferreira	Lisbon
20:00 WET (UTC±00:00)	Silva 58'; Otamendi (yellow card) 74'; Waldschmidt 90+4'	Report	Reabciuk 23'; Eustáquio (yellow card) 66'; Jordi (yellow card) 72'; Zé Uilton (yellow card) 78'	Stadium: Estádio da Luz; Attendance: 0 Referee: Rui Costa

20 December 2020 10	Gil Vicente	0–2	Benfica	Barcelos
17:30 WET (UTC±00:00)	Nogueira (yellow card) 39' (yellow-red card) 45'; Carvalho (yellow card) 63'	Report	Gilberto (yellow card) 43'; Weigl (yellow card) 46'; Rodrigão 58' (o.g.); Everton 65'	Stadium: Estádio Cidade de Barcelos; Attendance: 0 Referee: Nuno Almeida

29 December 2020 11	Benfica	2–1	Portimonense	Lisbon
18:00 WET (UTC±00:00)	Núñez 14'; Silva 23'; Otamendi (yellow card) 38'; Waldschmidt (yellow card) 59'; Taarabt (yellow card) 90+5'	Report	Candé (yellow card) 30'; Willyan (yellow card) 34'; Moufi (yellow card) 54'; Beto (yellow card) 76'; Gilberto 90+2' (o.g.)	Stadium: Estádio da Luz; Attendance: 0 Referee: Tiago Martins

4 January 2021 12	Santa Clara	1–1	Benfica	Ponta Delgada
16:00 WET (UTC±00:00)	Sagna (yellow card) 26'; Cardoso 59' (yellow card) 77'; Rashid (yellow card) 90+5'	Report	Ferro (yellow card) 29'; Núñez 32'	Stadium: Estádio de São Miguel; Attendance: 0 Referee: Hélder Malheiro

8 January 2021 13	Benfica	2–0	Tondela	Lisbon
19:00 WET (UTC±00:00)	Seferovic 56'; Everton (yellow card) 69'; Pizzi (yellow card) 73'; Waldschmidt 90+4'	Report		Stadium: Estádio da Luz; Attendance: 0 Referee: Manuel Oliveira

15 January 2021 14	Porto	1–1	Benfica	Porto
21:00 WET (UTC±00:00)	Taremi 25' (red card) 73'; Pepe (yellow card) 51'; Corona (yellow card) 64'; Marega (yellow card) 73'; Marchesín (yellow card) 90+5'	Report	Grimaldo 17'; Pizzi (yellow card) 50'; Tavares (yellow card) 54'; Chiquinho (yellow card) 78'; Vertonghen (yellow card) 84'	Stadium: Estádio do Dragão; Attendance: 0 Referee: Luís Godinho

25 January 2021 15	Benfica	1–1	Nacional	Lisbon
17:00 WET (UTC±00:00)	Chiquinho 14'; Jardel (yellow card) 71'	Report	Róchez 48'; Pedrão (yellow card) 80'; Micael (yellow card) 90+2'	Stadium: Estádio da Luz; Attendance: 0 Referee: Rui Costa

1 February 2021 16	Sporting CP	1–0	Benfica	Lisbon
21:30 WET (UTC±00:00)	Tomás (yellow card) 15'; Neto (yellow card) 40'; Nunes 90+2'; Tabata (yellow card) 90+5'	Report	Gilberto (yellow card) 13'; Weigl (yellow card) 16'; Otamendi (yellow card) 53'; Pizzi (yellow card) 76'; Gabriel (yellow card) 79'	Stadium: Estádio José Alvalade; Attendance: 0 Referee: Artur Soares Dias

5 February 2021 17	Benfica	0–0	Vitória de Guimarães	Lisbon
19:00 WET (UTC±00:00)	Weigl (yellow card) 67'	Report	André (yellow card) 32'; Trmal (yellow card) 90+1'	Stadium: Estádio da Luz; Attendance: 0 Referee: Nuno Almeida

8 February 2021 18	Benfica	2–0	Famalicão	Lisbon
19:00 WET (UTC±00:00)	Núñez 3'; Otamendi 7' (yellow card) 72'; Taarabt (yellow card) 56'; Gilberto (yellow card) 87'	Report	Babić (yellow card) 29'; Vinagre (yellow card) 58'	Stadium: Estádio da Luz; Attendance: 0 Referee: Hugo Miguel

14 February 2021 19	Moreirense	1–1	Benfica	Moreira de Cónegos
20:15 WET (UTC±00:00)	Yan 40' (pen.); Ba (yellow card) 58'; Pacheco (yellow card) 70'	Report	Seferovic 25'; Grimaldo (yellow card) 38'; Weigl (yellow card) 65'; Otamendi (yellow card) 73'	Stadium: Parque Joaquim de Almeida Freitas; Attendance: 0 Referee: Manuel Oliveira

21 February 2021 20	Farense	0–0	Benfica	Faro
20:15 WET (UTC±00:00)	Pedro Henrique (yellow card) 86'; Lucca (yellow card) 90+6'	Report	Gabriel (yellow card) 31'; Otamendi (yellow card) 89'	Stadium: Estádio de São Luís; Attendance: 0 Referee: Hugo Miguel

1 March 2021 21	Benfica	2–0	Rio Ave	Lisbon
19:00 WET (UTC±00:00)	Seferovic 59'; Silva (yellow card) 72'; Pizzi 78'	Report		Stadium: Estádio da Luz; Attendance: 0 Referee: Nuno Almeida

8 March 2021 22	Belenenses SAD	0–3	Benfica	Oeiras
20:15 WET (UTC±00:00)	Ramires (yellow card) 87'	Report	Seferovic 55', 58'; Veríssimo 65'	Stadium: Estádio Nacional; Attendance: 0 Referee: Tiago Martins

13 March 2021 23	Benfica	2–0	Boavista	Lisbon
18:00 WET (UTC±00:00)	Weigl (yellow card) 29'; Taarabt (yellow card) 39'; Seferovic 42', 52'	Report	Awaziem (red card) 8'	Stadium: Estádio da Luz; Attendance: 0 Referee: Manuel Mota

21 March 2021 24	Braga	0–2	Benfica	Braga
20:00 WET (UTC±00:00)	Fransérgio (yellow card) 27' (yellow-red card) 39'	Report	Otamendi (yellow card) 16'; Gonçalves (yellow card) 45+1'; Silva 45+2'; Seferovic 56'; Pizzi (yellow card) 65'; Weigl (yellow card) 70'	Stadium: Estádio Municipal de Braga; Attendance: 0 Referee: João Pinheiro

5 April 2021 25	Benfica	1–0	Marítimo	Lisbon
19:00 WEST (UTC+01:00)	Waldschmidt 21' (pen.); Weigl (yellow card) 23'; Silva (yellow card) 72'; Núñez (yellow card) 90+5'	Report	Renê (yellow card) 38'; Winck (yellow card) 38'; Pelágio (yellow card) 79'	Stadium: Estádio da Luz; Attendance: 0 Referee: Luís Godinho

10 April 2021 26	Paços de Ferreira	0–5	Benfica	Paços de Ferreira
20:30 WEST (UTC+01:00)	Eustáquio (red card) 22'; Costa (yellow card) 57'	Report	Gonçalves (yellow card) 28' (goal) 38'; Veríssimo (yellow card) 33'; Grimaldo (yellow card) 43'; Silva 45'; Seferovic 45+8', 78' (yellow card) 61'; Waldschmidt (yellow card) 58'; Núñez 89'	Stadium: Estádio da Mata Real; Attendance: 0 Referee: Hugo Miguel

17 April 2021 27	Benfica	1–2	Gil Vicente	Lisbon
18:00 WEST (UTC+01:00)	Veríssimo (yellow card) 31'; Carvalho 87' (o.g.)	Report	Leautey 35'; Lourency 81'; Denis (yellow card) 90+1'	Stadium: Estádio da Luz; Attendance: 0 Referee: Fábio Veríssimo

22 April 2021 28	Portimonense	1–5	Benfica	Portimão
19:00 WEST (UTC+01:00)	Beto 43'; Poha (yellow card) 72'	Report	Gabriel (yellow card) 6'; Pizzi 45+2'; Núñez 50'; Seferovic 64', 73'; Otamendi (yellow card) 78'; Everton 90+4'	Stadium: Estádio Municipal de Portimão; Attendance: 0 Referee: Artur Soares Dias

26 April 2021 29	Benfica	2–1	Santa Clara	Lisbon
19:00 WEST (UTC+01:00)	Carlos 25' (o.g.); Chiquinho 73'; Weigl (yellow card) 89'; Otamendi (yellow card) 90+3'	Report	Carvalho 62'	Stadium: Estádio da Luz; Attendance: 0 Referee: Hélder Malheiro

30 April 2021 30	Tondela	0–2	Benfica	Tondela
19:00 WEST (UTC+01:00)		Report	Pizzi 11'; Everton 19'; Chiquinho (yellow card) 68'	Stadium: Estádio João Cardoso; Attendance: 0 Referee: Manuel Mota

6 May 2021 31	Benfica	1–1	Porto	Lisbon
18:30 WEST (UTC+01:00)	Everton 23'; Weigl (yellow card) 31'; Veríssimo (yellow card) 58'; Silva (yellow card) 60'; Leite (yellow card) 71'; Gabriel (yellow card) 81'; Pizzi (yellow card) 81'; Seferovic (yellow card) 83'; Gonçalves (yellow card) 89'	Report	Oliveira (yellow card) 15'; Pepe (yellow card) 64'; Uribe 75'; Mbemba (yellow card) 81'	Stadium: Estádio da Luz; Attendance: 0 Referee: Artur Soares Dias

11 May 2021 32	Nacional	1–3	Benfica	Funchal
18:30 WEST (UTC+01:00)	Pedrão 8'; Vigário (yellow card) 60'	Report	Chiquinho (yellow card) 34'; Gilberto (yellow card) 55'; Pedrão 78' (o.g.); Grimaldo (yellow card) 80'; Ramos 81', 86'	Stadium: Estádio da Madeira; Attendance: 0 Referee: Rui Costa

15 May 2021 33	Benfica	4–3	Sporting CP	Lisbon
18:00 WEST (UTC+01:00)	Grimaldo (yellow card) 7'; Seferovic 12', 48' (pen.); Pizzi 29'; Veríssimo 37' (yellow card) 38'; Otamendi (yellow card) 43'; Gabriel (yellow card) 57'; Tavares (yellow card) 87'; Núñez (yellow card) 90+2'	Report	Reis (yellow card) 31'; Gonçalves 45+1', 77' (pen.) (yellow card) 90+2'; Mendes (yellow card) 57'; Santos 62'; João Mário (yellow card) 65'	Stadium: Estádio da Luz; Attendance: 0 Referee: Tiago Martins

19 May 2021 34	Vitória de Guimarães	1–3	Benfica	Guimarães
16:00 WEST (UTC+01:00)	Fernandes (yellow card) 53' (goal) 63'	Report	Taarabt (yellow card) 43'; Seferovic 48', 58'; Everton 90+1'	Stadium: Estádio D. Afonso Henriques; Attendance: 0 Referee: Vitor Ferreira

=== Taça de Portugal ===
21 November 2020 Third round	Paredes	0–1	Benfica	Paredes
21:15 WET (UTC±00:00)	Madureira (yellow card) 23'; Brito (yellow card) 25'; Santos (yellow card) 29'	Report	Samaris 25'; Ramos (yellow card) 40'	Stadium: Estádio da Cidade Desportiva de Paredes; Attendance: 0 Referee: Vitor Ferreira

13 December 2020 Fourth round	Benfica	5–0	Vilafranquense	Lisbon
20:30 WET (UTC±00:00)	Ramos 11' (yellow card) 60'; Pizzi 14'; Seferovic 15', 42'; Pedrinho 56'	Report	Kady (yellow card) 13'; Jefferson (yellow card) 84'	Stadium: Estádio da Luz; Attendance: 0 Referee: Andre Narciso

12 January 2021 Fifth round	Estrela da Amadora	0–4	Benfica	Amadora
21:15 WET (UTC±00:00)	Yuran (yellow card) 45+2'; Romano (yellow card) 45+2'; Latón (yellow card) 60'	Report	Chiquinho 42', 63'; Samaris (yellow card) 45+2'; Seferovic 51'; Waldschmidt 66'	Stadium: Estádio José Gomes; Attendance: 0 Referee: Joao Bento

28 January 2021 Quarter-finals	Benfica	3–0	Belenenses SAD	Lisbon
21:15 WET (UTC±00:00)	Núñez 32'; Silva 37'; Cervi 72'	Report	Dieguinho (yellow card) 86'	Stadium: Estádio da Luz; Attendance: 0 Referee: João Pinheiro

11 February 2021 Semi-finals; First leg	Estoril	1–3	Benfica	Estoril
20:15 WET (UTC±00:00)	Clóvis (yellow card) 12'; Vidigal 24'; Hugo (yellow card) 64'	Report	Gonçalves (yellow card) 8'; Núñez 45', 78'; Seferovic 69'; Otamendi (yellow card) 75'; Taarabt (yellow card) 82'	Stadium: Estádio António Coimbra da Mota; Attendance: 0 Referee: António Nobre

4 March 2021 Semi-finals; Second leg	Benfica	2–0 (5–1 agg.)	Estoril	Lisbon
20:15 WET (UTC±00:00)	Tavares (yellow card) 29'; Pizzi (yellow card) 30'; Ramos 43'; Waldschmidt 90'	Report	Lazare (yellow card) 15'	Stadium: Estádio da Luz; Attendance: 0 Referee: Hélder Malheiro

23 May 2021 Final	Braga	2–0	Benfica	Coimbra
20:30 WEST (UTC+01:00)	Esgaio (yellow card) 35'; Piazon 45+3' (red card) 90+4'; Musrati (yellow card) 67'; Novais (yellow card) 82'; R. Horta 85'	Report	Leite (red card) 17'; Silva (yellow card) 85'; Tavares (yellow card) 88'; Otamendi (yellow card) 89'; Taarabt (red card) 90+3'; Grimaldo (yellow card) 90+4'	Stadium: Estádio Cidade de Coimbra; Attendance: 0 Referee: Nuno Almeida

=== Taça da Liga ===
16 December 2020 Quarter-finals	Benfica	1–1 (4–1 p)	Vitória de Guimarães	Lisbon
21:00 WET (UTC±00:00)	Taarabt (yellow card) 41'; Pizzi 83' (pen.)	Report	Estupiñán 16'; Fernandes (yellow card) 52'; Luís (yellow card) 60'; Janvier (yellow card) 76'; Poha (yellow card) 82'	Stadium: Estádio da Luz; Attendance: 0 Referee: Fábio Veríssimo
	Penalties
	Everton (penalty scored); Pizzi (penalty scored); Gabriel (penalty scored); Seferovic (penalty scored)		(penalty missed) Almeida; (penalty scored) Pepelu; (penalty missed) Poha

20 January 2021 Semi-finals	Braga	2–1	Benfica	Leiria
19:45 WET (UTC±00:00)	Castro (yellow card) 20'; Ruiz 28'; Sequeira (yellow card) 34'; Tormena 59'; Esgaio (yellow card) 66'; Fransérgio (yellow card) 90+4'	Report	Todibo (yellow card) 38'; Pizzi 45' (pen.); Weigl (yellow card) 52'; Jardel (yellow card) 83'	Stadium: Estádio Dr. Magalhães Pessoa; Attendance: 0 Referee: Fábio Veríssimo

=== Supertaça Cândido de Oliveira ===
23 December 2020 Final	Porto	2–0	Benfica	Aveiro
20:45 WET (UTC±00:00)	Oliveira 25' (pen.) (yellow card) 53'; Pepe (yellow card) 36'; Mbemba (yellow card) 57'; Díaz 90'		Weigl (yellow card) 30'; Seferovic (yellow card) 90+3'	Stadium: Estádio Municipal de Aveiro; Attendance: 0 Referee: Hugo Miguel

=== UEFA Champions League ===
==== Qualifying phase ====
The draw for the third qualifying round was held on 31 August 2020, 12:00 CEST.

15 September 2020 Third qualifying round	PAOK (Greece)	2–1	(Portugal) Benfica	Thessaloniki, Greece
21:00 EEST (UTC+03:00)	Pelkas (yellow card) 1'; Varela (yellow card) 29'; Michailidis (yellow card) 45'; Giannoulis 63'; Živković 75'; Schwab (yellow card) 79'; Esiti (yellow card) 90+2'	Report	Almeida (yellow card) 44'; Silva 90+4'	Stadium: Toumba Stadium; Attendance: 0 Referee: Felix Brych (Germany)

=== UEFA Europa League ===
==== Group stage ====
The group stage draw was held on 2 October 2020.

Pos	Team	Pld	W	D	L	GF	GA	GD	Pts	Qualification	RAN	BEN	STL	LCH
1	(Scotland) Rangers	6	4	2	0	13	7	+6	14	Advance to knockout phase	—	2–2	3–2	1–0
2	(Portugal) Benfica	6	3	3	0	18	9	+9	12	Advance to knockout phase	3–3	—	3–0	4–0
3	(Belgium) Standard Liège	6	1	1	4	7	14	−7	4		0–2	2–2	—	2–1
4	(Poland) Lech Poznań	6	1	0	5	6	14	−8	3		0–2	2–4	3–1	—

Source: UEFA
Rules for classification: Group stage tiebreakers

22 October 2020 1	Lech Poznań (Poland)	2–4	(Portugal) Benfica	Poznań, Poland
18:55 CEST (UTC+02:00)	Ishak 15', 49'; Crnomarković (yellow card) 17'; Muhar (yellow card) 90+1'	Report	Pizzi 9' (pen.); Núñez 42', 60', 90+3'	Stadium: Stadion Miejski; Attendance: 0 Referee: Nikola Dabanović (Montenegro)

29 October 2020 2	Benfica (Portugal)	3–0	(Belgium) Standard Liège	Lisbon, Portugal
21:00 WET (UTC±00:00)	Gonçalves (yellow card) 43'; Pizzi 49' (pen.), 76'; Waldschmidt 66' (pen.)	Report	Bodart (yellow card) 48'; Fai (yellow card) 65'	Stadium: Estádio da Luz; Attendance: 4,750 (Note: The stadium's capacity was limited to 7.5%.); Referee: François Letexier (France)

5 November 2020 3	Benfica (Portugal)	3–3	(Scotland) Rangers	Lisbon, Portugal
18:55 WET (UTC±00:00)	Goldson 2' (o.g.); Otamendi (red card) 19'; Silva 77'; Núñez 90+1'	Report	Gonçalves 24' (o.g.); Kamara 12'; Morelos 51'	Stadium: Estádio da Luz; Attendance: 0 Referee: Jesús Gil Manzano (Spain)

26 November 2020 4	Rangers (Scotland)	2–2	(Portugal) Benfica	Glasgow, Scotland
21:00 CET (UTC+01:00)	Arfield 7'; Roofe 69'; Kamara (yellow card) 80'	Report	Gabriel (yellow card) 16'; Chiquinho (yellow card) 42'; Tavernier 78' (o.g.); Pizzi 81'; Vertonghen (yellow card) 83'	Stadium: Ibrox Stadium; Attendance: 0 Referee: Radu Petrescu (Romania)

3 December 2020 5	Benfica (Portugal)	4–0	(Poland) Lech Poznań	Lisbon, Portugal
21:00 WET (UTC±00:00)	Vertonghen 36'; Núñez 57'; Pizzi 58'; Weigl 89'	Report	Kacharava (yellow card) 2'; Marchwiński (yellow card) 72'	Stadium: Estádio da Luz; Attendance: 0 Referee: Srđan Jovanović (Serbia)

10 December 2020 6	Standard Liège (Belgium)	2–2	(Portugal) Benfica	Liège, Belgium
18:55 CET (UTC+01:00)	Raskin 12'; Tapsoba 60'; Cimirot (yellow card) 65'	Report	Everton 16'; Ferreira (yellow card) 53'; Pizzi 67' (pen.); Cervi (yellow card) 90+3'	Stadium: Stade Maurice Dufrasne; Attendance: 0 Referee: Aleksei Kulbakov (Belarus)

==== Knockout phase ====
===== Round of 32 =====
The draw for the round of 32 was held on 14 December 2020.

18 February 2021 First leg	Benfica (Portugal)	1–1	(England) Arsenal	Rome, Italy
21:00 WET (UTC±00:00)	Pizzi 55' (pen.)	Report	Smith Rowe (yellow card) 54'; Saka 57'	Stadium: Stadio Olimpico; Attendance: 0 Referee: Cüneyt Çakır (Turkey)
Note: The match, originally to be played at the Estádio da Luz in Lisbon, was moved to the Stadio Olimpico in Rome, due to restrictions imposed by Portugal on travelers from the United Kingdom out of concern of the COVID-19 variant B.1.1.7.

25 February 2021 Second leg	Arsenal (England)	3–2 (4–3 agg.)	(Portugal) Benfica	Piraeus, Greece
18:55 CET (UTC+01:00)	Aubameyang 21', 87'; Tierney 67'	Report	Taarabt (yellow card) 5'; Gonçalves 43'; Silva 61'	Stadium: Karaiskakis Stadium; Attendance: 0 Referee: Björn Kuipers (Netherlands)
Note: The match, originally to be played at Emirates Stadium in London, was moved to Karaiskakis Stadium in Piraeus, due to restrictions related to the COVID-19 pandemic imposed by the United Kingdom on travelers from Portugal.

== Statistics ==
=== Appearances and goals ===
As of 23 May 2021

No.	Pos	Nat	Player	Total		Primeira Liga		Taça de Portugal		Taça da Liga		Supertaça		Champions League		Europa League	
No.	Pos	Nat	Player	Apps	Goals	Apps	Goals	Apps	Goals	Apps	Goals	Apps	Goals	Apps	Goals	Apps	Goals
Goalkeepers
1	GK	(Belgium) BEL	Mile Svilar	2	0	1	0	1	0	0	0	0	0	0	0	0	0
77	GK	(Brazil) BRA	Helton Leite	26	0	15	0	5	0	2	0	0	0	0	0	4	0
99	GK	(Greece) GRE	Odysseas Vlachodimos	26	0	18	0	1+1	0	0	0	1	0	1	0	4	0
Defenders
2	DF	(Brazil) BRA	Gilberto	36	0	17+8	0	4+1	0	0+1	0	1	0	0	0	3+1	0
3	DF	(Spain) ESP	Álex Grimaldo	43	2	27+4	2	3+1	0	0	0	1	0	1	0	6	0
4	DF	(Brazil) BRA	Lucas Veríssimo	17	2	14	2	1	0	0	0	0	0	0	0	2	0
5	DF	(Belgium) BEL	Jan Vertonghen	42	1	26+2	0	3	0	1	0	1	0	1	0	8	1
30	DF	(Argentina) ARG	Nicolás Otamendi	38	1	27	1	4	0	0	0	1	0	0	0	6	0
33	DF	(Brazil) BRA	Jardel	18	0	5+3	0	4	0	2	0	0	0	0	0	2+2	0
34	DF	(Portugal) POR	André Almeida	5	0	4	0	0	0	0	0	0	0	1	0	0	0
71	DF	(Portugal) POR	Nuno Tavares	25	0	7+7	0	3+1	0	1	0	0+1	0	0	0	3+2	0
82	DF	(Portugal) POR	João Ferreira	5	0	1	0	1	0	2	0	0	0	0	0	1	0
91	DF	(Brazil) BRA	Morato	4	0	1+1	0	1+1	0	0	0	0	0	0	0	0	0
Midfielders
7	MF	(Brazil) BRA	Everton	48	8	24+8	7	2+2	0	1+1	0	1	0	1	0	6+2	1
8	MF	(Brazil) BRA	Gabriel	32	1	10+10	1	4	0	0+1	0	0	0	0	0	4+3	0
11	MF	(Argentina) ARG	Franco Cervi	21	1	5+9	0	3+1	1	1	0	0	0	0	0	0+2	0
17	MF	(Portugal) POR	Diogo Gonçalves	31	2	12+9	1	3+1	0	0	0	0+1	0	0	0	4+1	1
21	MF	(Portugal) POR	Pizzi	49	16	19+13	6	5+1	1	1+1	2	0	0	1	0	6+2	7
22	MF	(Greece) GRE	Andreas Samaris	9	1	1+5	0	2+1	1	0	0	0	0	0	0	0	0
28	MF	(Germany) GER	Julian Weigl	43	1	23+5	0	1+3	0	2	0	1	0	1	0	4+3	1
38	MF	(Brazil) BRA	Pedrinho	31	1	4+15	0	4	1	0+1	0	0+2	0	1	0	2+2	0
49	MF	(Morocco) MAR	Adel Taarabt	42	0	19+7	0	3+3	0	2	0	1	0	1	0	5+1	0
Forwards
9	FW	(Uruguay) URU	Darwin Núñez	44	14	19+10	6	2+2	3	2	0	1	0	0+1	0	5+2	5
10	FW	(Germany) GER	Luca Waldschmidt	41	10	18+9	7	1+3	2	1	0	1	0	0	0	5+3	1
14	FW	(Switzerland) SUI	Haris Seferovic	48	26	24+7	22	3+3	4	1+1	0	0+1	0	1	0	3+4	0
19	FW	(Portugal) POR	Chiquinho	27	4	2+16	2	3+2	2	0+1	0	0	0	0	0	2+1	0
27	FW	(Portugal) POR	Rafa Silva	46	9	27+2	5	3+2	1	2	0	1	0	0+1	1	4+4	2
78	FW	(Portugal) POR	Tiago Araújo	1	0	0	0	0+1	0	0	0	0	0	0	0	0	0
80	FW	(Brazil) BRA	Daniel	1	0	0	0	0+1	0	0	0	0	0	0	0	0	0
88	FW	(Portugal) POR	Gonçalo Ramos	12	4	0+4	2	4+1	2	0+1	0	0	0	0	0	0+2	0
Players who made an appearance and/or had a squad number but left the team
6	DF	(Portugal) POR	Rúben Dias	3	1	2	1	0	0	0	0	0	0	1	0	0	0
18	DF	(France) FRA	Jean-Clair Todibo	2	0	0	0	1	0	1	0	0	0	0	0	0	0
20	FW	(Portugal) POR	Dyego Sousa	0	0	0	0	0	0	0	0	0	0	0	0	0	0
37	FW	(Argentina) ARG	Facundo Ferreyra	3	0	0+1	0	0+2	0	0	0	0	0	0	0	0	0
73	FW	(Portugal) POR	Jota	0	0	0	0	0	0	0	0	0	0	0	0	0	0
84	DF	(Portugal) POR	Tomás Tavares	0	0	0	0	0	0	0	0	0	0	0	0	0	0
95	FW	(Brazil) BRA	Carlos Vinícius	2	0	0+1	0	0	0	0	0	0	0	0+1	0	0	0
97	DF	(Portugal) POR	Ferro	7	0	2+2	0	1	0	0+1	0	0	0	0	0	0+1	0
