= Guilherme Oliveira =

Guilherme Oliveira may refer to:

- Guilherme Oliveira (footballer) (born 1995), Portuguese footballer
- Guilherme Oliveira (racing driver) (born 2005), Portuguese racing driver
- Gui Oliveira (born 1985), Brazilian handball player
