= Amora F.C. =

Portuguese sports club

Amora
- Full name: Amora Futebol Clube
- Founded: 1 May 1921; 105 years ago
- Ground: Estádio da Medideira, Amora
- Capacity: 1,500
- Chairman: Carlos Henriques
- Manager: Ricardo Pessoa
- League: Liga 3
- 2024–25: Campeonato de Portugal, 2nd (Group D)
- Website: amorafcsad.pt
Home colours	Away colours

Amora Futebol Clube, commonly known as simply as Amora, is a Portuguese sports club from the city of Amora, Setúbal. The club was founded on 1 May 1921 and its founders were Mário de Carvalho, Guilherme Pestana, João Baptista, Julião Garcia, Tomás Alves, António Soares, Joaquim Monteiro, Oswaldo Reuter, Guilherme Reuter, Joaquim Zacarias, Leopoldo Grilo, Carlos de Azeitão, António Policia, Álvaro dos Santos, Jacinto Caixeiro, Alberto Malacato, Tomás da Cachamouca and António Manta. It currently plays at the Estádio da Medideira which also plays host to the club's reserve and youth teams.

The club currently plays in the Liga 3. The club has played on three occasions in the Primeira Liga from 1980–81 season until the 1982–83 season. José Mourinho's father Félix led the club to the Primeira Liga for the first time in 1980.

Amora FC's football SAD was owned by Mozambican investors from 2018 to 2020. In 2020, the club's SAD for football was bought by America Soccer, a company owned by US investors who were already investing in Middlesbrough (England) and Benevento (Italy) football teams.

== Appearances ==
- Premier Division: 3
- Tier 2: 2
- Tier 3: 23
- Tier 4: 27

== Honours ==
- Segunda Divisão
  - Winners (2): 1979–80, 1993–94
- Terceira Divisão
  - Winners (1): 2000–01

- AF Setúbal First Division
  - Winners (4): 1953–54, 1961–62, 1962–63, 1968–69
- AF Setúbal Cup
  - Winners (1): 2011–12

== League and cup history ==
Season		Pos.	Pl.	W	D	L	GS	GA	P	Cup	Notes
1980–81	1D	12	30	10	5	15	38	51	25	Round 6	
1981–82	1D	11	30	6	12	12	29	37	24	Round 6	
1982–83	1D	15	30	6	6	18	23	55	18	Round 3	Relegated
1992–93	2H	17	34	7	10	17	27	53	24	Quarter-final	Relegated
1993–94	2D	1	34	19	9	6	59	26	47	Round 3	Promoted
1994–95	2H	17	34	7	13	14	30	42	27	Last Sixteen	Relegated
1995–96	2DS	18	34	2	13	19	22	64	19	Round 4	Relegated
1996–97	3DS	3	34	15	10	9	46	33	55	Round 1	
1997–98	3DS	2	34	19	7	8	61	33	64	Round 4	Promoted
1998–99	2D	7	34	14	9	11	49	49	51	Round 4	
2002–03	2DS	3	38	17	9	12	48	39	60	Round 2	
2003–04	2DS	16	38	12	8	18	46	61	44	Round 3	
2004–05	2DS	20	38	5	10	23	36	68	25	Round 3	Relegated
2005–06	3DS	8	32	12	7	13	41	40	43	Round 1	
2006–07	3DS	3	28	13	7	8	31	31	46	Round 2	
2007–08	3DS	12	32	10	5	17	32	49	21	Round 1	Relegated
2008–09	4DS	4	30	15	9	6	47	29	54		
2009–10	4DS	3	30	18	7	5	54	24	61		
2010–11	4DS	3	30	13	3	14	42	44	42		
2011–12	4DS	3	30	18	5	7	56	30	59		
2012–13	4DS	1	32	13	8	11	46	50	34	Round 2	Promoted
2013–14	3DS	2	30	21	3	6	66	29	66	Round 2	
2014–15	3DS	2	30	23	9	1	60	22	69	Round 3	
2015–16	3DS	2	30	21	5	4	66	23	68	Round 1	
2016–17	3DS	2	30	21	5	4	78	26	68	Round 1	

== Presidents ==
	Name	Term
1st	João Batista Cunha	1921–22
2nd	António Nunes Tiago	1939–40
3rd	Teodomiro Costa	1944–45
4th	Efigénio Aires de Sousa	1945–46
5th	António Soares Pacheco	1948–49
6th	Joaquim Lizardo	1949–50
7th	Joaquim Galha dos Santos	1952–53
8th	Joaquim Galha dos Santos	1953–54
9th	Joaquim Pinheiro	1957–58
10th	Efigénio Aires de Sousa	1958–59
11th	Joaquim Pinto Malta	1959–60
12th	Felismino Galha dos Santos	1960–61
13th	Manuel Batista de Oliveira	1961–62
14th	Dr. Joaquim Mendes Gargaleiro	1963–64
15th	Cesário Gomes Henriques	1964–65
16th	Manuel Batista de Oliveira	1965–66
17th	Fernando Afonso de Almeida Rocha	1967–68
18th	Guilherme Octávio Costa Almeida	1968–69
19th	Sebastião Pinheiro	1969–70
20th	Joaquim Pinheiro	1970–71
21st	Manuel do Nascimento	1971–72
22nd	Sebastião Pinheiro	1972–73
23rd	Diamantino Rodrigues Barros	1973–74
24th	José Augusto Guerreiro	1974–75
25th	Rui da Conceição	1975–76
26th	Alfredo Correia da Silva	1976–77
27th	Mário Rui da Silva Ribeiro	1977–79
28th	Durives Pereira	1979–81
29th	Fernando Martinho Paixão Santos	1981–85
30th	Mário Rui da Silva Ribeiro	1985–96
31st	Manuel Guerreiro Gonçalves	1996–99
32nd	José Manuel Vicente Moreira Mendes	1999–2013
33rd	Carlos Manuel da Silva Henriques	2013–2015
34th	Zuneid Sidat	Since 2015

=== Current squad ===
As of 25 March, 2026

Note: Flags indicate national team as defined under FIFA eligibility rules; some limited exceptions apply. Players may hold more than one non-FIFA nationality.

No.	Pos.	Nation	Player
2	DF	POR	Guilherme Pinheiro
3	DF	POR	André Canteiro
4	DF	BRA	Marlom
6	DF	BRA	Renzo Trotta
7	MF	POR	Miguel Lopes
8	MF	POR	Mauro Antunes
9	FW	POR	João Oliveira
10	FW	CPV	Toni
11	FW	SEN	Buby Katty
13	DF	POR	Miguel Lopes
16	MF	POR	Pedro Teixeira
17	FW	POR	Ednilson Furtado
18	FW	POR	Martim Quinaz
19	FW	POR	Gustavo Barros
21	MF	CPV	Ben Traoré

No.	Pos.	Nation	Player
23	MF	POR	Filipe Marques
24	GK	POR	Iuri Miguel
25	DF	POR	Tiago Duque
27	DF	CIV	Badra Camara
28	MF	CPV	Hélio Cruz
29	MF	BRA	Pedro do Rio
31	GK	POR	Daniel Azevedo
37	DF	BRA	Wendel
48	GK	POR	Heloine Correia
49	FW	POR	Costinha
71	FW	POR	Dino Semedo
77	DF	POR	Fábio Pala
88	MF	POR	Caires
95	GK	BRA	Diego Riechelmann

== Notable players ==
- (Portugal) Vítor Baptista
- (Cape Verde) Cafú
- (Portugal) Diamantino Miranda
- (Portugal) José Ribeiro
- (São Tomé and Príncipe) Leonildo Soares
