= Mauro Antunes =

Portuguese footballer (born 1992)

Personal information
- Full name: Mauro Rafael da Costa Antunes
- Date of birth: 10 January 1992 (age 34)
- Place of birth: Setúbal, Portugal
- Height: 1.66 m (5 ft 5 in)
- Position: Midfielder

Team information
- Current team: Amora
- Number: 8

Youth career
- 2000–2009: Sporting CP
- 2009–2011: Belenenses

Senior career*
Years	Team	Apps	(Gls)
2011–2012	Moura	28	(3)
2012–2014	Atlético CP	31	(2)
2012–2013	→ Académico Viseu (loan)	7	(0)
2014–2015	Quarteirense	25	(1)
2015–2017	Anadia	63	(5)
2017–2019	Mafra	46	(4)
2019–2020	Amora	19	(0)
2020–2023	Belenenses	65	(5)
2023–2024	Vitória Setúbal	26	(1)
2024–	Amora	36	(4)

International career
2007	Portugal U16	2	(0)
- * Club domestic league appearances and goals as of 7 May 2026

Mauro Rafael da Costa Antunes (born 10 January 1992) is a Portuguese footballer who plays for Liga 3 club Amora as a midfielder.

== Career ==
On 29 July 2012, Antunes made his professional debut with Atlético in a 2012–13 Taça da Liga match against Naval.
