= Chiquinho (footballer, born 1995) =

Portuguese footballer

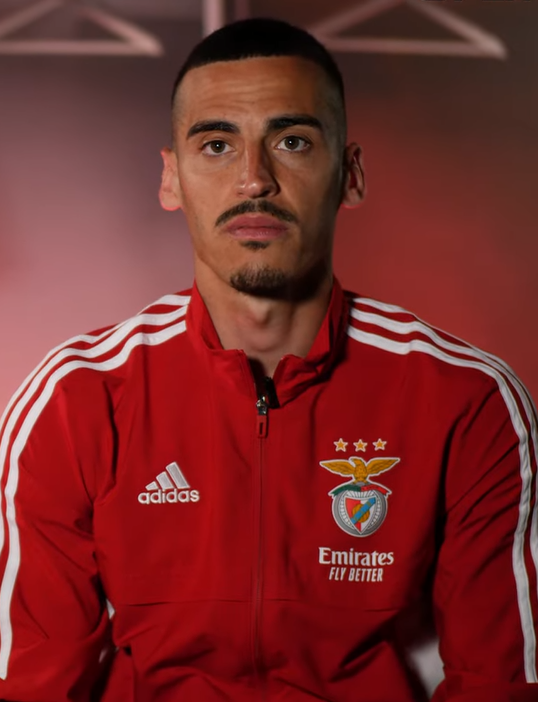
- Chiquinho with Benfica in 2023

Personal information
- Full name: Francisco Leonel Lima Silva Machado
- Date of birth: 19 July 1995 (age 31)
- Place of birth: Santo Tirso, Portugal
- Height: 1.74 m (5 ft 9 in)
- Position: Attacking midfielder

Team information
- Current team: Olympiacos
- Number: 22

Youth career
- 2003–2006: UDS Roriz
- 2006–2007: Pasteleira
- 2007–2008: Boavista
- 2008–2009: Pasteleira
- 2009–2014: Leixões

Senior career*
Years	Team	Apps	(Gls)
2014–2017	Leixões	34	(4)
2016	→ Gondomar (loan)	13	(1)
2017–2018	Lokomotiva	6	(0)
2017–2018	→ Académica (loan)	37	(9)
2018	Académica	0	(0)
2018	Benfica	0	(0)
2018–2019	Moreirense	34	(8)
2019–2024	Benfica	77	(5)
2021–2022	→ Braga (loan)	9	(0)
2022	→ Giresunspor (loan)	13	(4)
2024–	Olympiacos	82	(14)
- * Club domestic league appearances and goals as of 23:00, 8 November 2026 (UTC)

Francisco Leonel Lima Silva Machado (born 19 July 1995), known as Chiquinho, is a Portuguese professional footballer who plays as an attacking midfielder for Super League Greece club Olympiacos.

== Club career ==
=== Journeyman ===
Born in Santo Tirso, Porto District, Chiquinho finished his youth career with Leixões SC. He made his senior debut on 30 July 2014, playing 62 minutes in a 3–0 home win against C.D. Santa Clara in the first round of the Taça da Liga. His Segunda Liga bow occurred on 27 August in a 1–1 home draw with C.D. Tondela, and his first league goal was only scored two years later in a 1–2 loss to FC Porto B also at the Estádio do Mar.

In February 2017, Leixões accepted NK Lokomotiva's offer of €200,000, and Chiquinho signed a three-and-a-half-year contract with the Croatian club. His first match took place on 25 February, as a second-half substitute in a 2–0 First Football League home victory over NK Osijek.

Chiquinho joined Académica de Coimbra in July 2017 on a one-year loan, with an option to make the move permanent, which eventually befell only for the player to move to S.L. Benfica on a five-year deal on 28 May 2018. He was subsequently sold to Moreirense FC, with Benfica retaining 50% of his economic rights.

On 12 August 2018, Chiquinho made his debut in the Primeira Liga, featuring the entire 1–3 home defeat against Sporting CP. He totalled ten goals in his only season in Moreira de Cónegos, the first being the only in the third round of the Taça de Portugal to oust Associação Recreativa de São Martinho.

=== Benfica ===
Chiquinho returned to Benfica on 1 July 2019, signing a contract until 2024. In his first official appearance, against Sporting CP in the Supertaça Cândido de Oliveira on 4 August, he completed a 5–0 rout after having replaced Gabriel in the 82nd minute.

On 31 August 2021, Chiquinho was loaned to fellow top-tier side S.C. Braga without a buying option. The following February, also on loan, he joined Giresunspor of the Turkish Süper Lig.

Returned to the Estádio da Luz for the 2022–23 campaign, Chiquinho was initially deemed surplus to requirements. However, after Enzo Fernández's departure to Chelsea in the winter transfer window, he became an important member of the Roger Schmidt-led squad, contributing 25 games and one goal to the league champions.

=== Olympiacos ===
On 20 January 2024, Chiquinho joined Super League Greece club Olympiacos FC. He scored his first goal on 11 April, in a 3–2 home win over Fenerbahçe S.K. in the quarter-finals of the UEFA Europa Conference League.

Chiquinho won the double in his first full season, scoring eight times in the league. He scored his first goal in the UEFA Champions League on 26 November 2025, finalising a spectacular team effort to open an eventual 4–3 home loss to Real Madrid in the league phase; he left the field due to injury shortly after, however.

== Career statistics ==
As of match played 17 May 2026

Appearances and goals by club, season and competition
Club	Season	League			National cup (Note: Includes Taça de Portugal, Greek Football Cup)		League cup (Note: Includes Taça da Liga)		Continental		Other		Total	
Club	Season	Division	Apps	Goals	Apps	Goals	Apps	Goals	Apps	Goals	Apps	Goals	Apps	Goals
Leixões	2014–15	Liga Portugal 2	11	0	1	0	2	0	–		–		14	0
Leixões	2016–17	LigaPro	23	4	4	1	1	0	–		–		28	5
Leixões	Total		34	4	5	1	3	0	–		–		42	5
Gondomar (loan)	2015–16	Campeonato de Portugal	13	1	0	0	–		–		–		13	1
Lokomotiva	2016–17	Prva HNL	6	0	–		–		–		–		6	0
Académica (loan)	2017–18	LigaPro	37	9	4	0	0	0	–		–		41	9
Moreirense	2018–19	Primeira Liga	34	8	3	2	1	0	–		–		38	10
Benfica	2019–20	Primeira Liga	25	2	6	0	1	0	5 (Note: Three appearances in UEFA Champions League, two appearances in UEFA Europa League)	0	1 (Note: Appearance in Supertaça Cândido de Oliveira)	1	38	3
Benfica	2020–21	Primeira Liga	18	2	5	2	1	0	3 (Note: Appearances in UEFA Europa League)	0	0	0	27	4
Benfica	2022–23	Primeira Liga	25	1	4	0	3	1	12 (Note: Appearances in UEFA Champions League)	0	–		44	2
Benfica	2023–24	Primeira Liga	9	0	2	0	0	0	5	0	1	0	17	0
Benfica	Total		77	5	17	2	5	1	25	0	2	1	126	9
Braga (loan)	2021–22	Primeira Liga	9	0	1	0	2	0	3	0	–		15	0
Giresunspor (loan)	2021–22	Süper Lig	13	4	0	0	–		–		–		13	4
Olympiacos	2023–24	Super League Greece	15	1	–		–		8 (Note: Appearances in UEFA Europa Conference League)	1	–		23	2
Olympiacos	2024–25	Super League Greece	28	8	6	0	–		8	0	–		42	8
Olympiacos	2025–26	Super League Greece	30	4	2	1	–		10	1	1 (Note: Appearance in Greek Super Cup)	0	43	6
Olympiacos	Total		73	13	8	1	–		26	2	1	0	108	16
Career Total			296	44	38	6	11	1	54	2	3	1	402	54

== Honours ==
Benfica

- Primeira Liga: 2022–23
- Supertaça Cândido de Oliveira: 2019, 2023

Olympiacos

- Super League Greece: 2024–25
- Greek Football Cup: 2024–25
- Greek Super Cup: 2025
- UEFA Europa Conference League: 2023–24

Individual

- Super League Greece Team of the Season: 2023–24
- Super League Greece Player of the Month: August 2025, September 2025
