= Hélio Cruz =

Portuguese footballer (born 1993)

Personal information
- Full name: Hélio Altino Fonseca Lopes da Cruz
- Date of birth: 8 August 1993 (age 33)
- Place of birth: Lisbon, Portugal
- Height: 1.81 m (5 ft 11 1/2 in)
- Position: Midfielder

Team information
- Current team: Amora
- Number: 28

Youth career
- 2001–2004: Olivais Moscavide
- 2004–2007: Benfica
- 2007–2009: Olivais Moscavide
- 2009–2011: Estrela Amadora
- 2011–2012: Atlético CP

Senior career*
| Years | Team | Apps | (Gls) |
| 2012–2013 | Santo António Lisboa | | |
| 2013–2014 | Joane | 32 | (2) |
| 2014–2015 | Moreirense | 0 | (0) |
| 2015 | → Ribeirão (loan) | 8 | (0) |
| 2015–2016 | Atlético CP | 40 | (2) |
| 2016–2019 | Penafiel | 57 | (0) |
| 2019–2020 | Mafra | 1 | (0) |
| 2020–2022 | Amora | 49 | (2) |
| 2022–2024 | Belenenses | 49 | (0) |
| 2024–2025 | Atlético CP | 28 | (0) |
| 2025– | Amora | 25 | (0) |
- * Club domestic league appearances and goals as of 7 May 2026

Hélio Altino Fonseca Lopes da Cruz (born 8 August 1993) is a Portuguese professional footballer who plays as a midfielder for Liga 3 club Amora.

== Football career ==
On 2 August 2015, Cruz made his professional debut with Atlético in a 2015–16 Taça da Liga match against Santa Clara.

He is of Cape Verde descent.
