= Iuri Miguel =

Portuguese footballer

Personal information
- Full name: Iuri Gomes Miguel
- Date of birth: 8 September 1997 (age 29)
- Place of birth: Alcochete, Portugal
- Height: 1.90 m (6 ft 3 in)
- Position: Goalkeeper

Team information
- Current team: Amora
- Number: 24

Youth career
- 2006–2010: Alcochetense
- 2010–2014: Olímpico Montijo
- 2014–2016: Pinhalnovense

Senior career*
Years	Team	Apps	(Gls)
2015–2018	Pinhalnovense	11	(0)
2018–2019	B-SAD	0	(0)
2019–2021	Cova da Piedade	1	(0)
2021–2023	Real SC	32	(0)
2023–2025	Tondela	0	(0)
2025–	Amora	2	(0)
- * Club domestic league appearances and goals as of 7 May 2026

Iuri Gomes Miguel (born 8 September 1997) is a Portuguese professional footballer who plays as a goalkeeper for Liga 3 club Amora.

== Football career ==
He made his professional debut for Cova da Piedade on 13 September 2020 in the Liga Portugal 2.
