= Luisinho (footballer, born 1990) =

Portuguese footballer

Personal information
- Full name: Luís Miguel Pinheiro Andrade
- Date of birth: 27 March 1990 (age 36)
- Place of birth: Fornos de Algodres, Portugal
- Height: 1.70 m (5 ft 7 in)
- Position: Winger

Team information
- Current team: Fornos de Algodres

Youth career
- 1999–2003: Fornos de Algodres
- 2003–2007: Sporting CP
- 2007–2009: Académica

Senior career*
Years	Team	Apps	(Gls)
2009–2010	Fornos de Algodres	22	(4)
2010	Pampilhosa	4	(1)
2010−2015	Académico Viseu	161	(27)
2015−2017	Boavista	30	(2)
2016−2017	→ Académico Viseu (loan)	38	(1)
2017−2018	Académica	28	(3)
2018−2023	Académico Viseu	98	(8)
2023	Tondela	3	(0)
2024–	Fornos de Algodres	42	(41)
- * Club domestic league appearances and goals as of 10:55, 3 September 2026 (UTC)

Luís Miguel Pinheiro Andrade (born 27 March 1990), known as Luisinho, is a Portuguese professional footballer who plays as a winger for A.D. Fornos de Algodres.

== Club career ==
Born in Fornos de Algodres, Guarda District, Luisinho played lower league football until the age of 23. He joined Académico de Viseu F.C. in December 2010, and helped it promote from the fourth division to the Segunda Liga in his first two full seasons, scoring seven goals in the process.

Luisinho made his professional debut on 27 July 2013, starting in a 1–0 home win against Atlético Clube de Portugal in the first round of the Taça da Liga. His maiden appearance in the second tier occurred on 10 August, as he came on as a second-half substitute in a 2–0 loss at Moreirense FC.

Luisinho first arrived in the Primeira Liga in 2015–16, signing a two-year contract with Boavista F.C. aged 25. He scored in his first game in the competition, helping to a 2–2 draw away to Vitória de Setúbal. He returned to the second division the following campaign, being loaned to his former club Académico Viseu.

On 18 July 2017, Luisinho agreed to a one-year deal with Académica de Coimbra. After it expired, a transfer to F.C. Famalicão was arranged but cancelled shortly after; he remained in division two, however, returning to Académico.

Luisinho left the Estádio do Fontelo at the end of the 2022–23 season, totalling 331 matches and 41 goals across three spells. That summer, the 33-year-old joined fellow second-tier C.D. Tondela on a one-year contract, but left on 6 December.
