= A.D. Fornos de Algodres =

Portuguese association football club

Fornos de Algodres
- Full name: Associação Desportiva de Fornos de Algodres
- Founded: 1970
- Ground: Municipal de Fornos de Algodres, Fornos de Algodres, Guarda District, Portugal
- Capacity: 1,500
- Chairman: Bruno Filipe Ventura Costa
- Manager: Carlos Lopes
- League: AF Guarda 1° Divisão
- Website: http://adfornos.weebly.com/
Home colours	Away colours

A.D. Fornos de Algodres is a Portuguese football club from the municipality of Fornos de Algodres in the Guarda District. It was founded on 1970 and currently plays in the AF Guarda 1° Divisão, fourth tier on Portuguese football.

== Current squad ==
Note: Flags indicate national team as defined under FIFA eligibility rules; some limited exceptions apply. Players may hold more than one non-FIFA nationality.

No.	Pos.	Nation	Player
—	GK	POR	Marco Pereira
—	GK	POR	Ricardo Vital
—	DF	POR	Fábio Matos
—	DF	POR	Deni Alaba
—	DF	USA	Fernando Galvis
—	DF	POR	Jorge Ferreira
—	DF	EGY	Mahmoud Elmhdy
—	DF	POR	Stenio Cunha
—	DF	POR	Dino Uolu
—	DF	POR	Nuno Oliveira
—	MF	POR	António Tomás
—	MF	POR	Xande

No.	Pos.	Nation	Player
—	MF	BRA	Abner
—	MF	POR	Pedro Rodrigues
—	MF	POR	Marcelo Pinto
—	MF	POR	Edi Moura
—	MF	POR	Rui Lopes
—	MF	BRA	Vinicius
—	FW	POR	Hugo Costa
—	FW	POR	Tiago Marques
—	FW	POR	Bruno Filipe
—	FW	POR	Latão
—	FW	POR	Elisio Menezes
