= João Tarzan =

Portuguese footballer

Personal information
- Full name: João Miguel Ferreira Rodrigues
- Date of birth: 26 October 1994 (age 32)
- Place of birth: Óbidos, Portugal
- Height: 1.80 m (5 ft 11 in)
- Position: Striker

Team information
- Current team: Caldas
- Number: 35

Youth career
- 2003–2013: Espeleológica Óbidos

Senior career*
Years	Team	Apps	(Gls)
2013–2014	Espeleológica Óbidos		
2014–2018	Caldas	117	(9)
2018–2020	Leixões	9	(0)
2018–2019	→ B-SAD (loan)	2	(0)
2020–	Caldas	148	(45)
- * Club domestic league appearances and goals as of 7 May 2026

João Miguel Ferreira Rodrigues (born 26 October 1994) known as João Tarzan, is a Portuguese professional footballer who plays for Caldas as a forward.

== Football career ==
On 29 July 2018, Tarzan made his professional debut with Leixões in a 2018–19 Taça da Liga match against Feirense.
