= Zé Tiago =

Portuguese footballer

Personal information
- Full name: José Tiago Almeida Martins
- Date of birth: 19 August 1988 (age 38)
- Place of birth: Vila Nova de Gaia, Portugal
- Height: 1.67 m (5 ft 5 1/2 in)
- Position: Midfielder

Team information
- Current team: União Lamas

Youth career
- 1997–2001: Boavista
- 2001–2007: Candal

Senior career*
Years	Team	Apps	(Gls)
2007–2008	Candal		
2008–2009	Torre Moncorvo	24	(3)
2009–2010	Oliveira Douro	28	(6)
2010–2011	Candal	28	(12)
2011–2012	Macedo Cavaleiros	29	(7)
2012–2013	Boavista	12	(1)
2013–2014	Oliveirense	47	(11)
2014–2016	Covilhã	80	(13)
2016–2017	Aves	31	(4)
2017–2018	Académica	22	(1)
2018–2020	Mafra	55	(9)
2020–2021	Chaves	21	(3)
2021–2022	Varzim	31	(4)
2022–2024	Covilhã	48	(4)
2024	União Lamas	2	(0)
Total		458	(78)
- * Club domestic league appearances and goals

José Tiago Almeida Martins (born 19 August 1988), known as Zé Tiago, is a Portuguese former professional footballer who played as a midfielder.

== Club career ==
Born in Vila Nova de Gaia, Porto District, Zé Tiago played lower league or amateur football until the age of 26. In May 2014 he signed for Segunda Liga club S.C. Covilhã, making his professional debut on 16 August of that year when he came on as a late substitute in a 2–1 home win over FC Porto B. During his first season, he scored braces against Portimonense SC (4–0) and U.D. Oliveirense (4–1) to help his team to a final fourth position.

Subsequently, Zé Tiago represented still in the second division C.D. Aves and Académica de Coimbra. He helped the former side to return to the Primeira Liga after a ten-year absence, contributing 31 matches (32 in all competitions) and four goals to this feat.
