= Pedro Lagoa =

Portuguese footballer

Personal information
- Full name: Pedro Manuel Grácio Lagoa
- Date of birth: 21 August 1997 (age 29)
- Place of birth: Coimbra, Portugal
- Height: 1.80 m (5 ft 11 in)
- Position: Midfielder

Youth career
- 2007–2008: Alvaiázere
- 2008–2016: Académica

Senior career*
Years	Team	Apps	(Gls)
2016–2019	Académica	1	(0)
2016–2017	→ Académica – SF (loan)	25	(1)
2019–2020	Anadia	16	(1)
2020	Etar	7	(0)
2020–2021	Botev Vratsa	17	(2)
2021–2022	Mérida	5	(0)
- * Club domestic league appearances and goals as of 11:45, 5 December 2025 (UTC)

Pedro Manuel Grácio Lagoa (born 21 August 1997) is a Portuguese professional footballer who plays as a midfielder.

== Career ==
On 23 July 2017, Lagoa made his professional debut with Académica de Coimbra in a 2017–18 Taça da Liga match against Arouca. He joined Bulgarian club Etar Veliko Tarnovo in February 2020, signing a contract until the summer of 2021.
