= Mike Moura =

Portuguese footballer (born 1989)

Personal information
- Full name: Mickael Pereira Moura
- Date of birth: 1 October 1989 (age 37)
- Place of birth: Grenoble, France
- Height: 1.79 m (5 ft 10 in)
- Position: Right-back

Youth career
- 2001–2008: Fafe

Senior career*
Years	Team	Apps	(Gls)
2008–2013	Fafe	128	(6)
2013–2015	Santa Clara	75	(1)
2015–2016	Chaves	16	(0)
2016–2017	Covilhã	41	(1)
2017–2021	Académica	88	(1)
2021–2022	Vilafranquense	25	(1)
2022–2025	Felgueiras 1932	57	(1)
Total		430	(11)
- * Club domestic league appearances and goals

Mickael 'Mike' Pereira Moura (born 1 October 1989) is a former professional footballer who played as a right-back.

== Club career ==
Born to Portuguese parents in Grenoble, France, Moura started playing football in Portugal, with lowly AD Fafe, helping it achieve promotion to the third division in 2010. During his spell with the club, he majored in sociology at the University of Minho.

In the summer of 2013, Moura signed for C.D. Santa Clara. He made his debut as a professional on 11 August, playing the full 90 minutes in a 0–1 home loss against G.D. Chaves in the Segunda Liga. After impressive displays for the Azores side during the month of October, he was voted Young Player of the Month.

Moura continued competing in the second tier the following years, representing Chaves, S.C. Covilhã, Académica de Coimbra, U.D. Vilafranquense and F.C. Felgueiras 1932. Aged 35, he retired and was immediately appointed his last club's team manager.
