= Chapi Romano =

Argentine footballer

Personal information
- Full name: Gastón Manuel Romano
- Date of birth: 25 May 1998 (age 28)
- Place of birth: Buenos Aires, Argentina
- Height: 1.78 m (5 ft 10 in)
- Position: Midfielder

Team information
- Current team: Džiugas
- Number: 16

Youth career
- 2014–2015: River Plate
- 2016–2019: Huracán

Senior career*
Years	Team	Apps	(Gls)
2019–2020	Espinho	18	(4)
2020–2022	Estrela Amadora	59	(3)
2022–2023	Taranto	14	(0)
2023–2024	Belenenses	30	(1)
2024–2025	Botoşani	3	(0)
2025–	Džiugas	30	(0)
- * Club domestic league appearances and goals as of 30 May 2026

Gastón Manuel Romano (born 25 March 1998), known as Chapi Romano, is an Argentine footballer who plays as a midfielder for Lithuanian Džiugas Club.

== Club career ==
On 27 January 2023, Romano's contract with Taranto was terminated by mutual consent.

On 30 June 2023, Romano signed for newly promoted Liga Portugal 2 club Belenenses.

== Career statistics ==
=== Club ===
As of 28 August 2024

Club	Season	League			National Cup		League Cup		Other		Total	
Club	Season	Division	Apps	Goals	Apps	Goals	Apps	Goals	Apps	Goals	Apps	Goals
Espinho	2019–20	Campeonato de Portugal	18	4	4	0	–		–		22	4
Estrela Amadora	2020–21	Campeonato de Portugal	29	2	4	0	–		–		33	2
Estrela Amadora	2021–22	Liga Portugal 2	30	1	3	0	1	0	–		34	1
Estrela Amadora	Total		59	3	7	0	1	0	–		67	3
Taranto	2022–23	Serie C	14	0	1 (Note: Appearance in Coppa Italia Serie C)	0	–				15	0
Belenenses	2023–24	Liga Portugal 2	30	1	1	0	2	0	–		33	1
Botoşani	2024–25	Liga I	3	0	1	0	–		–		4	0
Career total			124	8	14	0	3	0	0	0	141	8
