= Femi Balogun =

Nigerian footballer (born 1992)

Personal information
- Full name: Femi Emmanuel Balogun
- Date of birth: 27 December 1992 (age 33)
- Place of birth: Kaduna, Nigeria
- Height: 1.76 m (5 ft 9 in)
- Position: Winger

Youth career
- Star Bombers Kaduna

Senior career*
Years	Team	Apps	(Gls)
2009–2012	Kaduna United	–	(–)
2012–2013	Atlético Baleares	35	(2)
2013–2015	Olhanense	70	(3)
2015–2016	Ermis Aradippou	10	(0)
2016	→ Farense (loan)	18	(0)
2016–2017	C.D. Aves	40	(3)
2017–2018	Belenenses	3	(0)
2017–2018	→ Académica (loan)	25	(3)
2018–2019	Gazişehir	5	(0)
2019	Académica	5	(0)
2019−2022	Cova da Piedade	47	(1)
2022−2023	Oriental Dragon FC	9	(0)
2023	J.D. Lajense	?	(?)
2024	C.D. Estarreja	?	(?)
2024	G.D. Monte do Trigo	?	(?)
2024−	G.D. Messejanense	?	(?)

International career
2008	Nigeria U17	2	(0)
- * Club domestic league appearances and goals

Femi Emmanuel Balogun (born 27 December 1992) is a Nigerian footballer who plays as a left winger in Portuguese lower leagues.

== Career ==
=== Atlético Baleares ===
Balogun began his professional career at Kaduna United, and few years later, he joined Atlético Baleares of Spain in 2012/2013 season.

=== S.C. Olhanense ===
Femi Balogun moved to S.C. Olhanense in 2013/2014 season, he scored his first league goal against S.L. Benfica in Portugal first Division match on 15 December 2013.

In the 2014-2015 season with S.C. Olhanense he assisted in many goals for the team.

=== Ermis Aradippou ===
In August 2015 Balogun joined Ermis Aradippou in Cyprus First Division for the 2015/2016 season, later in January 2016 he moved to S.C. Farense a Portugal League second Division side on loan till end of the 2015/2016 season.

=== Desportivo das Aves ===
In May 2016 Femi Balogun signed for Desportivo das Aves Portugal League second Division for 2016/2017 season, Desportivo das Aves was promoted to Liga one after a successful 2016/2017 season.

=== C.F. Os Belenenses ===
In June 2017 Femi Balogun signed a two-year-contract for C.F. Os Belenenses.

=== Académica de Coimbra – O.A.F. ===
In August 2017 Femi Balogun moved to Académica on loan till end of the season, on his debut for Academica scored a goal.

== Honours ==
=== Club ===
Kaduna United

- Nigerian FA Cup (1): 2010
