= Ricardo Dias =

Portuguese footballer (born 1991)

Personal information
- Full name: Ricardo Jorge dos Santos Dias
- Date of birth: 25 February 1991 (age 35)
- Place of birth: Aveiro, Portugal
- Height: 1.89 m (6 ft 2 in)
- Position: Defensive midfielder

Team information
- Current team: Atlético
- Number: 18

Youth career
- 1999–2006: Beira-Mar
- 2006–2010: Porto
- 2006–2007: → Padroense (loan)

Senior career*
Years	Team	Apps	(Gls)
2010–2011	Porto	0	(0)
2010–2011	→ Tourizense (loan)	16	(1)
2011	→ Santa Clara (loan)	11	(1)
2011–2014	Beira-Mar	71	(1)
2015–2018	Belenenses	36	(1)
2016–2017	→ Feirense (loan)	17	(0)
2017–2018	→ Académica (loan)	29	(5)
2018–2019	B-SAD	0	(0)
2018–2019	→ Académica (loan)	26	(0)
2019–2022	Académica	75	(2)
2022–2023	Vilafranquense	17	(0)
2023–2024	AVS	6	(0)
2024–2025	Alverca	39	(1)
2025–	Atlético	24	(0)

International career
2006–2007	Portugal U16	10	(0)
2007–2008	Portugal U17	10	(0)
2009	Portugal U18	4	(1)
2009–2010	Portugal U19	16	(3)
2010–2012	Portugal U20	10	(0)
Medal record
Men's football
Representing Portugal
FIFA U-20 World Cup
Runner-up	2011 Colombia
- * Club domestic league appearances and goals as of 7 May 2026

Ricardo Jorge dos Santos Dias CvIH (born 25 February 1991) is a Portuguese professional footballer who plays as a defensive midfielder for Liga 3 club Atlético Clube de Portugal.

== Club career ==
Born in Aveiro, Dias joined FC Porto's youth system at the age of 15. On 17 October 2009, still a junior, he made his competitive debut for the first team, coming on as a second-half substitute in a 4–0 home win against Sertanense F.C. in the third round of the Taça de Portugal. He split the 2010–11 season on loan, to G.D. Tourizense and C.D. Santa Clara.

Dias signed a two-year contract with S.C. Beira-Mar on 26 July 2011. He played his first match in the Primeira Liga on 6 November, featuring the entire 2–1 home victory over C.D. Feirense. He finished his debut campaign with a further ten games, in a 13th-place finish.

In late November 2014, after cutting ties with the club, then in the Segunda Liga, Dias returned to the top division and joined C.F. Os Belenenses until 30 June 2018. He scored his first goal in the competition on 14 March 2015, the hosts' first in the 2–2 home draw with G.D. Estoril Praia.

Dias was then consecutively loaned to Feirense and Académica de Coimbra, the former side competing in the top tier, the latter in the second. He scored a career-best five goals in his season at the Estádio Cidade de Coimbra, but his team failed to win promotion as fourth; Belenenses were also renamed B-SAD, and he agreed to another temporary deal in June 2018.

On 18 July 2019, Dias signed a permanent contract with Académica. In June 2022, following their relegation to Liga 3, he remained in division two by joining U.D. Vilafranquense, and was later part of the renamed AVS Futebol SAD.

On 23 January 2024, Dias' link was terminated by mutual agreement. The following day, he moved to third-tier F.C. Alverca.

== International career ==
Dias won 50 caps for Portugal across five youth levels. He was part of the under-20 team that took part in the 2011 FIFA World Cup, making four appearances in Colombia for the runners-up.

== Honours ==
Porto

- Taça de Portugal: 2009–10

Portugal U20

- FIFA U-20 World Cup runner-up: 2011

Orders

- Knight of the Order of Prince Henry
