= Tiago Duque =

Portuguese footballer (born 1994)

Personal information
- Full name: Tiago Miguel Pereira Duque
- Date of birth: 25 June 1994 (age 32)
- Place of birth: Seixal, Portugal
- Height: 1.87 m (6 ft 2 in)
- Position: Centre-back

Team information
- Current team: Amora
- Number: 25

Youth career
- 2002–2007: Amora
- 2007–2009: Ginásio Corroios
- 2009–2011: Sporting CP
- 2011–2013: Benfica

Senior career*
Years	Team	Apps	(Gls)
2013–2018	Os Belenenses	0	(0)
2013–2014	→ Sintrense (loan)	23	(2)
2014–2015	→ Atlético (loan)	34	(1)
2015–2017	→ Olhanense (loan)	66	(1)
2017–2018	→ Académica (loan)	2	(0)
2018	→ Titus Pétange (loan)	13	(0)
2018–2020	Amora	41	(1)
2020	Titus Pétange	4	(0)
2020–2021	Praiense	14	(0)
2021–2022	Oliveirense	23	(1)
2022–2023	Amora	24	(1)
2023–2024	Vitória Setúbal	31	(2)
2024–	Amora	28	(0)

International career
2009–2010	Portugal U16	6	(0)
2010–2011	Portugal U17	13	(2)
2011	Portugal U18	4	(1)
- * Club domestic league appearances and goals as of 7 May 2026

Tiago Miguel Pereira Duque (born 25 June 1994) is a Portuguese footballer who plays as a centre-back for Liga 3 club Amora.

== Club career ==
On 27 July 2014, Duque made his professional debut with Atlético in a 2014–15 Taça da Liga match against Aves.
