= Michel (footballer, born 1999) =

Brazilian footballer

Personal information
- Full name: Michel Borges de Jesus
- Date of birth: 23 December 1999 (age 26)
- Place of birth: Nova Lima, Brazil
- Height: 1.76 m (5 ft 9 in)
- Position: Attacking midfielder

Team information
- Current team: Alverca B

Youth career
- Cruzeiro
- Villa Nova-MG
- Figueirense-MG
- 2017–2019: Cruzeiro

Senior career*
Years	Team	Apps	(Gls)
2019–2020	Cruzeiro	0	(0)
2020	→ Paraná (loan)	16	(0)
2021	Botafogo-SP	4	(0)
2022	Lagarto	2	(0)
2022	Catanduva		
2022	Internacional de Minas		
2023	Villa Nova	10	(0)
2023	Uberlândia		
2023–	Alverca B	8	(0)
- * Club domestic league appearances and goals as of 12 November 2023

Michel Borges de Jesus (born 23 December 1999), known as Michel, is a Brazilian footballer who plays as a midfielder for Portuguese club Alverca B.
