= Pedro Empis =

Portuguese footballer (born 1997)

Personal information
- Full name: Pedro Carvalhosa Empis
- Date of birth: 1 February 1997 (age 29)
- Place of birth: Lisbon, Portugal
- Height: 1.70 m (5 ft 7 in)
- Position: Left-back

Team information
- Current team: Radnik Surdulica
- Number: 15

Youth career
- 2007–2011: Estoril
- 2011–2016: Sporting CP

Senior career*
Years	Team	Apps	(Gls)
2016–2018	Sporting CP B	29	(0)
2017–2018	→ Académica (loan)	11	(0)
2018–2019	Sporting U23	22	(0)
2019–2021	Estoril	3	(0)
2021–2022	Cultural Leonesa	22	(0)
2022–2024	União Leiria	48	(3)
2024–2025	Marítimo	10	(0)
2025–	Radnik Surdulica	2	(0)

International career
2013–2014	Portugal U17	10	(0)
2015–2016	Portugal U19	13	(1)
2016–2017	Portugal U20	5	(0)
2016	Portugal U21	1	(0)
- * Club domestic league appearances and goals as of 3:19, 20 September 2025 (UTC)

Pedro Carvalhosa Empis (born 1 February 1997) is a Portuguese professional footballer who plays as a left-back for Serbian Superliga club Radnik Surdulica.

== Club career ==
Born in Lisbon, Empis joined local Sporting CP's youth system at the age of 14, from neighbouring G.D. Estoril Praia. On 6 August 2016 he made his senior debut with the former's B team, playing the full 90 minutes in a 1–2 home loss against Portimonense S.C. in the Segunda Liga.

For the 2017–18 season, Empis was loaned to Académica de Coimbra of the same league. After cutting ties with Sporting, he returned to Estoril.

Empis signed a two-year contract with Spanish Primera División RFEF club Cultural y Deportiva Leonesa on 23 June 2021.

== International career ==
Empis won his only cap for Portugal at under-21 level on 11 October 2016 at the age of 19, as a second-half substitute for Ricardo Horta in the 7–1 away rout of Liechtenstein in the 2017 UEFA European Championship qualifiers.
