= Dieguinho (footballer, born 1992) =

Brazilian footballer

Personal information
- Full name: Diego Francisco Rocha
- Date of birth: 7 June 1992 (age 34)
- Place of birth: Bebedouro, Brazil
- Height: 1.78 m (5 ft 10 in)
- Position: Forward

Youth career
- –2010: Paraná

Senior career*
Years	Team	Apps	(Gls)
2011–2012	Paraná	24	(4)
2011	→ Avaí (loan)	4	(0)
2012–2016	Estoril	23	(0)
2013–2015	→ Beira-Mar (loan)	45	(7)
2015	→ Portimonense (loan)	12	(0)
2016–2019	Cova da Piedade	77	(19)
2019–2021	Belenenses SAD	9	(0)
2021–2022	Mafra	10	(1)
- * Club domestic league appearances and goals as of 14:50, 12 March 2024

Diego Francisco Rocha (born 7 June 1992), known as Dieguinho, is a Brazilian professional footballer who plays as a forward.

== Career ==
=== Paraná ===
Dieguinho scored his first goal for the club against Athletico Paranaense on 6 February 2011, scoring in the 29th minute. He made his professional debut in the Campeonato Brasileiro Série B for Paraná on 25 May 2011 in a game against Portuguesa.

=== Avaí ===
Dieguinho made his league debut for Avaí against São Paulo on 12 November 2011.

=== Estoril ===
Dieguinho made his league debut for Estoril against Académica on 17 March 2013.

=== Beira-Mar ===
Dieguinho made his league debut for Beira-Mar against Trofense on 1 September 2013. He scored his first goal for the club against Santa Clara on 2 October 2013, scoring in the 48th minute.

=== Portimonense ===
Dieguinho made his league debut for Portimonense against Oriental Lisboa on 7 February 2015.

=== Cova de Piedade ===
Dieguinho made his league debut for Cova de Piedade against Sporting CP B on 28 September 2016. He scored his first goal for the club against Olhanense on 2 October 2016, scoring in the 53rd minute.

=== Belenenses SAD ===
On 31 January 2019, Dieguinho joined Belenenses SAD on a 3-year contract, starting from the 2019–20 season. He made his league debut for the club against Portimonense on 9 September 2019.

Dieguinho also played for the B side, making his league debut against Olímpico do Montijo on 18 October 2020.

=== Mafra ===
On 13 July 2021, he moved to Mafra. Dieguinho made his league debut against Estrela on 18 January 2022. He scored his first goal for the club against FC Porto B on 12 February 2022, scoring in the 88th minute.
