= Guilherme Oliveira (footballer) =

Portuguese footballer

Personal information
- Full name: Guilherme da Mata Oliveira
- Date of birth: 12 April 1995 (age 31)
- Place of birth: Venda do Pinheiro, Portugal
- Height: 1.90 m (6 ft 3 in)
- Position: Goalkeeper

Team information
- Current team: Belenenses
- Number: 99

Youth career
- 2003–2004: Atlético Malveira
- 2004–2014: Sporting CP

Senior career*
Years	Team	Apps	(Gls)
2014–2018	Sporting CP B	3	(0)
2016–2017	→ Cova Piedade (loan)	0	(0)
2017–2018	→ Académica (loan)	1	(0)
2018–2021	B-SAD	2	(0)
2019–2020	→ Fátima (loan)	17	(0)
2020	→ Louletano (loan)	5	(0)
2021–2022	Torreense	11	(0)
2022–2023	Fafe	12	(0)
2023–2024	Belenenses	10	(0)
2024–2025	1º Dezembro	25	(0)
2025–	Belenenses	30	(0)

International career
2013–2014	Portugal U19	4	(0)
2015	Portugal U20	1	(0)
- * Club domestic league appearances and goals as of 7 May 2026

Guilherme da Mata Oliveira (born 12 April 1995) is a Portuguese professional footballer who plays for as a goalkeeper for Liga 3 club Belenenses.

== Club career ==
Born in the village of Venda do Pinheiro in Mafra, Lisbon District, Oliveira was in Sporting CP's academy from 2004. He made his professional debut for the reserves on 15 February 2015 in a 4–0 away loss against C.D. Aves in Segunda Liga, his sole appearance of the season.

After two more games the following campaign, Oliveira was loaned to C.D. Cova da Piedade in the same league. He played only two competitive matches during his tenure, both in the Taça de Portugal; the second was on 19 November 2016, a 2–0 defeat at Primeira Liga side G.D. Estoril Praia in the fourth round.

Oliveira spent 2017–18 on loan at Associação Académica de Coimbra, also of division two. On 1 July 2018, he signed for B-SAD on a contract until 2021. He made his top-flight debut for the latter club as a substitute for Cleylton the following 5 May, when the regular starter Muriel was sent off in the 22nd minute of an 8–1 home loss to Sporting.

In August 2019, Oliveira was loaned to C.D. Fátima in the third tier. He continued to play at that level the following seasons, with Louletano DC, S.C.U. Torreense, AD Fafe and C.F. Os Belenenses.
