= Pedro do Rio =

Brazilian footballer

Personal information
- Full name: Pedro Bernardo do Rio
- Date of birth: 21 November 2000 (age 25)
- Height: 1.76 m (5 ft 9 in)
- Position: Midfielder

Team information
- Current team: Lusitânia

Youth career
- 2016–2019: Ferroviária

Senior career*
Years	Team	Apps	(Gls)
2018–2019	Ferroviária	1	(0)
2020–2022	Athletico Paranaense	0	(0)
2020–2022	→ Inter de Limeira (loan)	26	(1)
2023	Manaus		
2023	Noroeste		
2023–	Lusitânia	6	(0)
- * Club domestic league appearances and goals as of 12 November 2023

Pedro Bernardo do Rio (born 21 November 2000) is a Brazilian footballer who plays for Portuguese club Lusitânia as a midfielder.

== Career statistics ==
=== Club ===
As of 7 June 2020.

Club	Season	League			State league		Cup		Continental		Other		Total	
Club	Season	Division	Apps	Goals	Apps	Goals	Apps	Goals	Apps	Goals	Apps	Goals	Apps	Goals
Ferroviária	2018	Série D	0	0	0	0	0	0	–		12 (Note: Appearances in the Copa Paulista)	0	12	0
Ferroviária	2019	Série D	0	0	1 (Note: Appearances in the Campeonato Paulista)	0	0	0	–		0	0	1	0
Ferroviária	Total		0	0	1	0	0	0	0	0	12	0	13	0
Athletico Paranaense	2020	Série A	0	0	0	0	0	0	0	0	0	0	0	0
Career total			0	0	1	0	0	0	0	0	12	0	13	0
