= 2016–17 Associação Académica de Coimbra – O.A.F. season =

Académica
2016–17 season
- President: Paulo Almeida
- Coach: Costinha
- Stadium: Estádio Cidade de Coimbra
- LigaPro: 6th
- Taça de Portugal: Quarter-finals
- Taça da Liga: First round
- Top goalscorer: League: Rui Miguel (10); All: Rui Miguel (12)
- Highest home attendance: 3,542; Académica 1–0 Sporting CP B (30 December 2016)
- Lowest home attendance: 1,425; Académica 1–0 Penafiel (15 December 2016)
- Average home league attendance: 2,570
- All statistics correct as of 1 June 2017.

The 2016–17 season is Académica's first season in the LigaPro following their relegation from the Primeira Liga last season. This season they also participated in the Taça de Portugal and Taça da Liga.

== Pre-season and friendlies ==
Win Draw Loss

9 July 2016 Friendly	Académica (Portugal)	1–0	(Portugal) Académico de Viseu	Coimbra, Portugal
10:30 WEST (UTC+01:00)	Tom 29'			Stadium: Academia Dolce Vita

15 July 2016 Friendly	Tondela (Portugal)	1–1	(Portugal) Académica	Luso, Portugal
18:00 WEST (UTC+01:00)	Wágner 16'		Yuri 39'	Stadium: Centro de Estágios do Luso

16 July 2016 Friendly	Académica (Portugal)	2–1	(Portugal) Fátima	Coimbra, Portugal
10:30 WEST (UTC+01:00)	Marinho; Tom		Goal	Stadium: Academia Dolce Vita

20 July 2016 Troféu Crédito Agrícola	Académica (Portugal)	0–0 (3–4 p)	(Portugal) Feirense	Coimbra, Portugal
20:00 WEST (UTC+01:00)		[[[Category:All articles with unsourced statements]]		Stadium: Estádio Cidade de Coimbra; Attendance: 2,409
	Penalties
	Ki (penalty scored); Taborda (penalty missed); Vidigal (penalty scored); Plange (penalty scored); Pedro Nuno (penalty missed)		(penalty missed) Monteiro; (penalty scored) Platiny; (penalty scored) Fabinho; (penalty scored) Barge; (penalty scored) Vieirinha

23 July 2016 Friendly	Recreio de Águeda (Portugal)	1–2	(Portugal) Académica	Águeda, Portugal
19:30 WEST (UTC+01:00)	Diego 67'	[[[Category:All articles with unsourced statements]]	Makonda 81'; Dany Marques 87'	Stadium: Estádio Municipal de Águeda

== Competitions ==
=== Overall record ===
As of match played on 21 May 2017

Performance by competition
Competition	Starting round	Current position/round	Final position/round	First match	Last match
LigaPro	—N/a	3rd	6th	6 August 2016	21 May 2017
Taça de Portugal	Second round	—	Quarter-finals	25 September 2016	17 January 2017
Taça da Liga	First round	—	First round	30 July 2016	

Statistics by competition
Competition	Pld	W	D	L	GF	GA	GD	Win%
LigaPro	42	17	11	14	42	35	+7	40.48
Taça de Portugal	5	3	1	1	6	3	+3	60.00
Taça da Liga	1	0	1	0	0	0	+0	0.00
Total	48	20	13	15	48	38	+10	41.67

=== LigaPro ===
==== League table ====
Pos	Team	Pld	W	D	L	GF	GA	GD	Pts	Promotion or relegation
4	Benfica B	42	18	9	15	56	58	−2	63	Ineligible for promotion
5	Penafiel	42	18	9	15	56	55	+1	63	
6	Académica	42	17	11	14	42	35	+7	62	
7	Braga B	42	16	14	12	64	50	+14	62	Ineligible for promotion
8	Sporting da Covilhã	42	15	17	10	51	41	+10	62	

Source: Liga Portugal
Rules for classification: 1) Points; 2) Head-to-head points; 3) Head-to-head goal difference; 4) Head-to-head away goals scored; 5) Goal difference; 6) Matches won; 7) Goals scored; 8) Play-off.
(Note: The LPFP decided that only criteria 1, 5, 6 and 7 would be applied to establish the classification during the competition.)

==== Results by round ====
Round	1	2	3	4	5	6	7	8	9	10	11	12	13	14	15	16	17	18	19	20	21	22	23	24	25	26	27	28	29	30	31	32	33	34	35	36	37	38	39	40	41	42
Ground	A	H	A	H	H	A	H	A	H	A	H	A	H	A	H	A	H	H	A	H	A	H	A	H	A	A	H	A	H	A	H	A	H	A	H	A	H	A	A	H	A	H
Result	W	L	L	D	W	D	W	D	L	W	W	D	D	L	W	D	W	W	L	W	L	W	D	W	D	L	W	L	L	W	D	L	W	L	D	L	D	L	L	W	W	W
Position	1	12	14	16	12	15	9	11	11	5	7	6	7	6	8	7	6	5	5	4	4	3	3	3	3	3	3	3	5	5	5	5	3	5	9	9	10	12	12	12	10	6

Updated to match(es) played on 1 June 2017. Source: [[[Category:All articles with unsourced statements]]
A = Away; H = Home; W = Win; D = Draw; L = Loss

==== Matches ====
6 August 2016 1	Olhanense	1–2	Académica	Olhão
11:15 WEST (UTC+01:00)	González 52'	Report	Rui Miguel 41'; Marreco 67'	Stadium: Estádio José Arcanjo; Attendance: 821; Referee: Hélder Malheiro

14 August 2016 2	Académica	0–1	Santa Clara	Coimbra
16:00 WEST (UTC+01:00)		Report	Pineda 5'	Stadium: Estádio Cidade de Coimbra; Attendance: 3,003; Referee: Gonçalo Martins

21 August 2016 3	Penafiel	1–0	Académica	Penafiel
11:15 WEST (UTC+01:00)	Ribeiro 54' (pen.)	Report		Stadium: Estádio Municipal 25 de Abril; Attendance: 627; Referee: Bruno Paixão

24 August 2016 4	Académica	0–0	Portimonense	Coimbra
16:00 WEST (UTC+01:00)		Report		Stadium: Estádio Cidade de Coimbra; Attendance: 2,311; Referee: Luís Ferreira

28 August 2016 5	Académica	1–0	União da Madeira	Coimbra
16:00 WEST (UTC+01:00)	Kaká 42'	Report		Stadium: Estádio Cidade de Coimbra; Attendance: 2,009; Referee: Hugo Miguel

4 September 2016 (Note: The match was originally to be played on 28 September 2016 but it was brought forward.) 9	Académica	0–1	Vizela	Coimbra
16:00 WEST (UTC+01:00)		Report	Abreu 78'	Stadium: Estádio Cidade de Coimbra; Attendance: 2,519; Referee: Manuel Oliveira

16 September 2016 7	Académica	3–0	Famalicão	Coimbra
19:30 WEST (UTC+01:00)	Marreco 31'; Ohemeng 88'; Traquina 90+4'	Report		Stadium: Estádio Cidade de Coimbra; Attendance: 2,420; Referee: Carlos Xistra

21 September 2016 8	Cova da Piedade	1–1	Académica	Cova da Piedade
16:00 WEST (UTC+01:00)	Barros 82'	Report	Marreco 21'	Stadium: Estádio Municipal José Martins Vieira; Attendance: 1,135; Referee: Jorge Ferreira

2 October 2016 10	Fafe	1–2	Académica	Felgueiras
11:15 WEST (UTC+01:00)	Jota 39'	Report	Real 21'; Marreco 35'	Stadium: Estádio Dr. Machado de Matos; Attendance: 962; Referee: João Bento

5 October 2016 (Note: The match was originally to be played on 11 September 2016 but it was postponed.) 6	Sporting da Covilhã	0–0	Académica	Covilhã
15:30 WEST (UTC+01:00)		Report		Stadium: Estádio Municipal José dos Santos Pinto; Attendance: 637; Referee: João Capela

10 October 2016 (Note: The match was originally to be played on 19 October 2016 but it was brought forward.) 11	Académica	3–2	Varzim	Coimbra
19:30 WEST (UTC+01:00)	Makonda 20'; Rui Miguel 69'; Marreco 77'	Report	Costa 8', 87'	Stadium: Estádio Cidade de Coimbra; Attendance: 2,007; Referee: Ioan Vasilica

23 October 2016 12	Académico de Viseu	0–0	Académica	Viseu
16:00 WEST (UTC+01:00)		Report		Stadium: Estádio do Fontelo; Attendance: 847; Referee: Fábio Veríssimo

30 October 2016 13	Académica	0–0	Gil Vicente	Coimbra
15:00 WET (UTC±00:00)		Report		Stadium: Estádio Cidade de Coimbra; Attendance: 2,708; Referee: Gonçalo Martins

5 November 2016 14	Desportivo das Aves	2–0	Académica	Vila das Aves
11:15 WET (UTC±00:00)	Mendy 72'; Hackman 90+1'	Report		Stadium: Estádio do CD Aves; Attendance: 950; Referee: Carlos Macedo

13 November 2016 (Note: The match was originally to be played on 23 November 2016 but it was brought forward.) 15	Académica	1–0	Leixões	Coimbra
15:00 WET (UTC±00:00)	Traquina 26'	Report		Stadium: Estádio Cidade de Coimbra; Attendance: 2,572; Referee: Luís Ferreira

27 November 2016 16	Freamunde	0–0	Académica	Freamunde
15:00 WET (UTC±00:00)		Report		Stadium: Complexo Desportivo do SC Freamunde; Attendance: 741; Referee: Bruno Vieira

4 December 2016 17	Académica	1–0	Braga B	Coimbra
15:00 WET (UTC±00:00)	Rui Miguel 62' (pen.)	Report		Stadium: Estádio Cidade de Coimbra; Attendance: 1,737; Referee: Anzhony Rodrigues

10 December 2016 18	Académica	2–1	Benfica B	Coimbra
16:00 WET (UTC±00:00)	Marreco 3'; Real 90+4'	Report	P. Rodrigues 57' (pen.)	Stadium: Estádio Cidade de Coimbra; Attendance: 3,027; Referee: Vítor Ferreira

19 December 2016 19	Vitória de Guimarães B	2–1	Académica	Guimarães
15:00 WET (UTC±00:00)	Boyd 64'; Duarte 89' (pen.)	Report	Kaká 49'	Stadium: Estádio D. Afonso Henriques; Attendance: 1,475; Referee: Pedro Vilaça

30 December 2016 (Note: The match was originally to be played on 21 December 2016 but it was postponed.) 20	Académica	1–0	Sporting CP B	Coimbra
15:00 WET (UTC±00:00)	Rui Miguel 43' (pen.)	Report		Stadium: Estádio Cidade de Coimbra; Attendance: 3,542; Referee: Carlos Cabral

8 January 2017 21	Porto B	2–1	Académica	Pedroso
15:00 WET (UTC±00:00)	Galeno 19'; Varela 79'	Report	Traquina 81'	Stadium: Estádio Dr. Jorge Sampaio; Attendance: 590; Referee: Luís Ferreira

12 January 2017 22	Académica	2–0	Olhanense	Coimbra
20:30 WET (UTC±00:00)	Ohemeng 27'; Plange 89'	Report		Stadium: Estádio Cidade de Coimbra; Attendance: 3,107; Referee: Bruno Esteves

22 January 2017 23	Santa Clara	1–1	Académica	Ponta Delgada, Azores
16:00 WET (UTC±00:00)	D. Santos 11'	Report	Marinho 90'	Stadium: Estádio de São Miguel; Attendance: 1,142; Referee: Artur Soares Dias

28 January 2017 24	Académica	3–2	Penafiel	Coimbra
15:00 WET (UTC±00:00)	Makonda (yellow card) 42'; Ricardo Ribeiro (yellow card) 45+1'; Kaká 50'; Rui Miguel 60' (pen.) (yellow card) 90+1'; Marinho 63' (red card) 90+7'; Leandro Silva (yellow card) 70'; Nuno Santos (yellow card) 71' (red card) 83'; Diogo Coelho (red card) 90+4'	Report	Wellington Carvalho 12'; Daniel Martins (yellow card) 45'; Rafa Sousa (yellow card) 45+1' (red card) 90+7'; Kalindi (yellow card) 57'; Fidélis 65' (yellow card) 81'; Diouf (yellow card) 90'; João Paulo (red card) 90+7'	Stadium: Estádio Cidade de Coimbra; Attendance: 2,512; Referee: (Portugal) Manuel Mota

4 February 2017 25	Portimonense	0–0	Académica	Portimão
11:15 WET (UTC±00:00)	Ricardo Pessoa (yellow card) 49'; Wilson Manafá (yellow card) 69'; Luís Mata (yellow card) 87'	Report	Yuri (yellow card) 78'	Stadium: Estádio Municipal de Portimão; Attendance: 1,817; Referee: (Portugal) Jorge de Sousa

11 February 2017 26	União da Madeira	2–1	Académica	Ribeira Brava, Madeira
15:00 WET (UTC±00:00)	Marakis 26'; Gian Martins (yellow card) 34'; Kusunga 38'; Nduwarugira (yellow card) 65'; Nilson (yellow card) 67'; Nsor (yellow card) 90+4'	Report	Makonda (yellow card) 84'; Kaká (yellow card) 85'; Rui Miguel 87'	Stadium: Centro Desportivo da Madeira; Attendance: 819; Referee: (Portugal) Jorge Ferreira

15 February 2017 27	Académica	2–0	Sporting da Covilhã	Coimbra
19:00 WET (UTC±00:00)	Rui Miguel 30'; Nuno Piloto (yellow card) 79'; Tom 80'; Kaká (yellow card) 88'	Report	Zé Pedro (yellow card) 3'; Sambinha (yellow card) 28' (yellow-red card); Medarious (yellow card) 40'; Pintassilgo (yellow card) 59'	Stadium: Estádio Cidade de Coimbra; Attendance: 2,687; Referee: (Portugal) Miguel Silva

19 February 2017 28	Famalicão	2–1	Académica	Vila Nova de Famalicão
15:00 WET (UTC±00:00)	Carlão 23' 63'; Joel Monteiro (yellow card) 67'; Victor Braga (yellow card) 90+2'	Report	Rui Miguel (yellow card) 15'; Makonda 41' (yellow card) 70'; André Vidigal (yellow card) 79'; Ricardo Ribeiro (yellow card) 87'	Stadium: Estádio Municipal 22 de Junho; Attendance: 2,954; Referee: (Portugal) Manuel Oliveira

25 February 2017 29	Académica	1–2	Cova da Piedade	Coimbra
11:15 WET (UTC±00:00)	Makonda (yellow card) 68'; Leandro Silva 90'; Nuno Santos (yellow card) 90+2'	Report	Bruno Sapo (yellow card) 35'; Irobiso (yellow card) 52'; Robson 57' 90+4' (pen.); Dieguinho (yellow card) 79'	Stadium: Estádio Cidade de Coimbra; Attendance: 2,594; Referee: (Portugal) Bruno Vieira

5 March 2017 30	Vizela	0–1	Académica	Vizela
15:00 WET (UTC±00:00)	Luís Ferraz (yellow card) 72'; Diogo Lamelas (yellow card) 79'	Report	João Real (yellow card) 39'; Traquina 75'	Stadium: Estádio do FC Vizela; Attendance: 926; Referee: (Portugal) Luís Máximo

11 March 2017 31	Académica	0–0	Fafe	Coimbra
15:00 WET (UTC±00:00)	João Simões (yellow card) 36'	Report	Carvalho (red card) 6'; André (yellow card) 37'; Alan (yellow card) 45'; Hottor (yellow card) 68'; Ricardo Fernandes (yellow card) 84'; Evandro Brandão (yellow card) 89'	Stadium: Estádio Cidade de Coimbra; Attendance: 3,174; Referee: (Portugal) Carlos Macedo

19 March 2017 33	Académica	1–2	Académico de Viseu	Coimbra
16:00 WET (UTC±00:00)	Traquina 8'	Report	Zé Paulo 48' 56'	Stadium: Estádio Cidade de Coimbra; Attendance: 2,757; Referee: Carlos Cabral

26 March 2017 32	Varzim	0–2	Académica	Póvoa de Varzim
15:00 WET (UTC±00:00)		Report	Leandro Silva 47'; Marinho 71'	Stadium: Estádio do Varzim SC; Attendance: 2,303; Referee: António Nobre

2 April 2017 34	Gil Vicente	1–0	Académica	Barcelos
11:15 WEST (UTC+01:00)	Paulinho 37'	Report		Stadium: Estádio Cidade de Barcelos; Attendance: 662; Referee: Anzhony Rodrigues

6 April 2017 35	Académica	0–0	Desportivo das Aves	Coimbra
20:15 WEST (UTC+01:00)		Report		Stadium: Estádio Cidade de Coimbra; Attendance: 3,357; Referee: Luís Godinho

14 April 2017 36	Leixões	2–1	Académica	Matosinhos
16:00 WEST (UTC+01:00)	Fatai 50'; Tino 57'	Report	Ki 18'	Stadium: Estádio do Mar; Attendance: 5,685; Referee: Rui Costa

19 April 2017 37	Académica	2–2	Freamunde	Coimbra
20:00 WEST (UTC+01:00)	Rui Miguel 6'; Yuri 71'	Report	Rui Raínho 32'; Rui Sampaio 54'	Stadium: Estádio Cidade de Coimbra; Attendance: 1,742; Referee: Fábio Veríssimo

24 April 2017 38	Braga B	1–0	Académica	Braga
16:00 WEST (UTC+01:00)	Martínez 34'	Report		Stadium: Estádio 1º de Maio; Attendance: 400; Referee: André Neto

30 April 2017 39	Benfica B	1–0	Académica	Seixal
16:00 WEST (UTC+01:00)	Ferro 78'	Report		Stadium: Caixa Futebol Campus; Attendance: 806; Referee: João Bento

6 May 2017 40	Académica	1–0	Vitória de Guimarães B	Coimbra
11:15 WEST (UTC+01:00)	D. Coelho 10'	Report		Stadium: Estádio Cidade de Coimbra; Attendance: 2,163; Referee: Luís Ferreira

14 May 2017 41	Sporting CP B	1–2	Académica	Alcochete
16:00 WEST (UTC+01:00)	Gelson 7'	Report	Rui Miguel 60' 76'	Stadium: CGD Stadium Aurélio Pereira; Attendance: 312; Referee: Tiago Antunes

21 May 2017 42	Académica	2–1	Porto B	Coimbra
16:00 WEST (UTC+01:00)	Kaká 30'; D. Ribeiro 85'	Report	Moreira 34'	Stadium: Estádio Cidade de Coimbra; Attendance: 2,014; Referee: Vítor Ferreira

=== Taça de Portugal ===
==== Second round ====
25 September 2016	Gouveia	1–2	Académica	Gouveia
15:00 WEST (UTC+01:00)	Oumar 72'		Rui Miguel 40', 42'	Stadium: Estádio Municipal do Farvão; Attendance: 3,000; Referee: João Matos

==== Third round ====
16 October 2016	Académica	2–0	Belenenses	Coimbra
19:15 WEST (UTC+01:00)	Marinho 37'; Dinis 64' (o.g.)			Stadium: Estádio Cidade de Coimbra; Attendance: 1,502; Referee: João Pinheiro

==== Fourth round ====
19 November 2016	Feirense	0–0 (a.e.t.) (4–5 p)	Académica	Santa Maria da Feira
16:00 WET (UTC±00:00)				Stadium: Estádio Marcolino de Castro; Attendance: 2,000; Referee: Artur Soares Dias
	Penalties
	Fabinho (penalty scored); Silva (penalty scored); Etebo (penalty scored); Ícaro (penalty missed); Platiny (penalty scored)		(penalty scored) Rui Miguel; (penalty scored) Traquina; (penalty scored) Plange; (penalty scored) Tom; (penalty scored) Real

==== Fifth round ====
14 December 2016	Académica	1–0	Penafiel	Coimbra
18:00 WET (UTC±00:00)	Ohemeng 88'			Stadium: Estádio Cidade de Coimbra; Attendance: 1,425; Referee: Rui Costa

==== Quarter-finals ====
17 January 2017	Estoril	2–1	Académica	Estoril
18:15 WET (UTC±00:00)	Alisson 31'; Kléber 85'		Traquina 58'	Stadium: Estádio António Coimbra da Mota; Attendance: 2,175; Referee: Rui Costa

=== Taça da Liga ===
==== First round ====
30 July 2016	Gil Vicente	0–0 (5–4 p)	Académica	Barcelos
18:00 WEST (UTC+01:00)		Report		Stadium: Estádio Cidade de Barcelos; Attendance: 704; Referee: Pedro Vilaça
	Penalties
	Reko (penalty scored); Paulinho (penalty scored); Ricardinho (penalty scored); Avto (penalty scored); Luiz Eduardo (penalty scored)		(penalty scored) Makonda; (penalty scored) Rui Miguel; (penalty scored) Yuri; (penalty scored) Alexandre; (penalty missed) Marreco

== Players ==
=== Appearances and goals ===
No.	Pos	Nat	Player	Total		LigaPro		Taça de Portugal		Taça da Liga	
No.	Pos	Nat	Player	Apps	Goals	Apps	Goals	Apps	Goals	Apps	Goals
Goalkeepers
1	GK	(Portugal) POR	João Gomes	0	0	0	0	0	0	0	0
74	GK	(Portugal) POR	José Costa	9	0	2+1	0	5	0	1	0
87	GK	(Portugal) POR	Ricardo Ribeiro	40	0	40	0	0	0	0	0
Defenders
3	DF	(Portugal) POR	Diogo Coelho	36	1	32	1	4	0	0	0
4	DF	(Portugal) POR	Hugo Ribeiro	0	0	0	0	0	0	0	0
5	DF	(Brazil) BRA	William Gustavo	0	0	0	0	0	0	0	0
6	DF	(France) FRA	Tripy Makonda	38	2	27+5	2	4+1	0	0+1	0
8	DF	(Portugal) POR	Pedro Correia	12	0	8+2	0	1	0	1	0
13	DF	(Portugal) POR	João Real	39	2	34	2	4	0	1	0
14	DF	(Portugal) POR	João Simões	9	0	9	0	0	0	0	0
17	DF	(Portugal) POR	Nuno Santos	33	0	28+2	0	2	0	1	0
18	DF	(Portugal) POR	Nuno Esgueirão	1	0	1	0	0	0	0	0
21	DF	(Portugal) POR	Alexandre Alfaiate	10	0	8+1	0	1	0	0	0
29	DF	(Portugal) POR	Rúben Vinagre	0	0	0	0	0	0	0	0
44	DF	(Brazil) BRA	Yuri Matias	17	1	14+1	1	1	0	1	0
Midfielders
2	MF	(Cape Verde) CPV	Tom Tavares	23	1	7+11	1	1+3	0	1	0
12	FW	(Portugal) POR	Leandro Silva	19	2	13+6	2	0	0	0	0
22	MF	(Brazil) BRA	Kaká	35	4	28+4	4	2	0	1	0
24	MF	(South Korea) KOR	Hwang Mun-ki	12	0	1+6	0	4	0	1	0
27	MF	(Portugal) POR	Pedro Nuno	11	0	8+1	0	2	0	0	0
28	MF	(Portugal) POR	Nuno Piloto	34	0	21+8	0	3+1	0	1	0
65	MF	(Portugal) POR	Fernando Alexandre	15	0	12+1	0	1	0	1	0
88	MF	(Cape Verde) CPV	Jimmy	20	0	13+4	0	2	0	0+1	0
Forwards
7	FW	(Portugal) POR	Marinho	44	4	37+2	3	3+1	1	1	0
9	FW	(Portugal) POR	Leandro Cardoso	3	0	0+3	0	0	0	0	0
10	FW	(Portugal) POR	Rui Miguel	37	12	22+9	10	3+2	2	0+1	0
11	FW	(Portugal) POR	André Vidigal	5	0	0+5	0	0	0	0	0
19	FW	(Ghana) GHA	Ernest Ohemeng	38	3	16+18	2	3+1	1	0	0
20	FW	(Portugal) POR	João Traquina	41	6	31+5	5	5	1	0	0
23	FW	(Portugal) POR	Dany Marques	2	0	0+2	0	0	0	0	0
33	FW	(China) CHN	Li Rui	2	0	0+1	0	0+1	0	0	0
43	FW	(Burkina Faso) BFA	Nii Plange	27	1	21+2	1	4	0	0	0
66	FW	(Portugal) POR	Diogo Ribeiro	16	1	2+14	1	0	0	0	0
90	FW	(Portugal) POR	Tozé Marreco	28	6	21+2	6	2+2	0	1	0

Last updated: 1 June 2017
Source: Equipa

=== Transfers ===
==== Summer ====
In:

Date	Position	Player	From	Fee	Ref
1 June 2016	MF	(Cape Verde) Jimmy	(Portugal) Santa Clara	Loan return	
21 June 2016	FW	(Portugal) Rui Miguel	(Portugal) Penafiel	Free	
21 June 2016	FW	(Portugal) João Traquina	(Portugal) Belenenses	Free	
22 June 2016	DF	(Portugal) Nuno Santos	(Portugal) Tondela	Free	
23 June 2016	GK	(Portugal) José Costa	(Portugal) Braga	Undisclosed	
24 June 2016	FW	(Portugal) Dany Marques	(Portugal) Académica – SF	Free	
24 June 2016	DF	(Portugal) Hugo Ribeiro	Youth system	Free	
27 June 2016	DF	(Brazil) Yuri Matias	(Brazil) América-PE	1-year loan	
28 June 2016	FW	(Portugal) André Vidigal	Youth system	Free	
29 June 2016	DF	(Portugal) Pedro Correia	(Portugal) Vitória de Guimarães	Undisclosed	
30 June 2016	MF	(Cape Verde) Tom	(Portugal) Oriental	Free	
6 July 2016	FW	(Portugal) Tozé Marreco	(Belgium) Mouscron-Péruwelz	Free	
8 July 2016	MF	(Brazil) Kaká	(Portugal) Mafra	1-year loan	
5 August 2016	GK	(Portugal) Ricardo Ribeiro	(Portugal) Belenenses	Undisclosed	
5 August 2016	DF	(Portugal) Alexandre Alfaiate	(Portugal) Benfica	1-year loan	
8 August 2016	FW	(China) Li Rui	(Portugal) AD Oliveirense	Free	
22 August 2016	FW	(Portugal) Diogo Coelho	(Portugal) Nacional	1-year loan	
31 August 2016	FW	(Portugal) Rúben Vinagre	(France) Monaco	1-year loan	
31 August 2016	FW	(Ghana) Ernest Ohemeng	(Portugal) Moreirense	1-year loan	

Out: (Note: Please note that this table only shows those players released or sold who were part of the first team.)

Date	Position	Player	To	Fee	Ref
31 May 2016	FW	(Portugal) Gonçalo Paciência	(Portugal) Porto	Loan ended	
31 May 2016	MF	(Portugal) Leandro Silva	(Portugal) Porto	Loan ended	
31 May 2016	DF	(Portugal) Rafa Soares	(Portugal) Porto	Loan ended	
31 May 2016	FW	(Ivory Coast) Inters Gui	(Portugal) Vitória de Guimarães	Loan ended	
8 June 2016	GK	(Brazil) Lee Oliveira	(Iran) Sepahan	Free	
20 June 2016	FW	(Portugal) Rafael Lopes	(Portugal) Chaves	Free	
27 June 2016	DF	(Brazil) Ricardo Nascimento	(South Africa) Mamelodi Sundowns	Free	
3 July 2016	DF	(Ghana) Richard Ofori	(Portugal) Sporting da Covilhã	Free	
12 July 2016	MF	(Portugal) Hugo Seco	(Bulgaria) Cherno More Varna	Free	
12 July 2016	GK	(Portugal) Pedro Trigueira	(Portugal) Vitória de Setúbal	Free	
1 August 2016	MF	(Portugal) Artur Taborda	(Portugal) Académica – SF	1-year loan	
6 August 2016	FW	(Portugal) Rabiola	(Portugal) Paços de Ferreira	Free	
17 August 2016	MF	(France) Selim Bouadla	(Croatia) Slaven Belupo	Free	
31 August 2016	FW	(Ivory Coast) Magique	(Portugal) Cova da Piedade	Free	
31 August 2016	FW	(Portugal) Rui Pedro	(Bulgaria) CSKA Sofia	Free	
15 September 2016	MF	(Nigeria) Nwankwo Obiora	(Greece) Levadiakos	Free	

==== Winter ====
In:

Date	Position	Player	From	Fee	Ref
19 January 2017	MF	(Portugal) Leandro Silva	(Portugal) Porto	6-month loan	
27 January 2017	FW	(Portugal) Diogo Ribeiro	(Portugal) Santa Clara	Free	

Out:

Date	Position	Player	From	Fee	Ref
28 November 2016	MF	(Portugal) Pedro Nuno	(Portugal) Benfica	Undisclosed	
1 January 2017	MF	(Portugal) Fernando Alexandre	(Portugal) Moreirense	6-month loan	
1 January 2017	FW	(Portugal) Dany Marques	(Portugal) Académica – SF	6-month loan	
1 January 2017	GK	(Portugal) João Gomes	(Portugal) Oleiros	6-month loan	
1 January 2017	DF	(Brazil) William Gustavo	(Portugal) Oleiros	Free	
1 January 2017	FW	(Portugal) Tozé Marreco	(Portugal) Famalicão	6-month loan	

== Coaching staff ==
Position	Staff
Coach	(Portugal) Costinha
Assistant Coach	(Portugal) Sérgio Gaminha
Fitness Coach	(Portugal) Nuno Pinto
Goalkeeping Coach	(Portugal) Tozé Cerdeira

Last updated: 8 October 2016
Source: Equipa Técnica
