= 2012–13 in Uruguayan football =

Football in Uruguay
- Season: 2012–13

== National leagues ==
=== Primera División ===
Bella Vista	Central Español	Cerro	Cerro Largo
Danubio	Defensor Sporting	El Tanque Sisley	Fénix
Juventud	Liverpool	M. Wanderers	Nacional
Peñarol	Progreso	Racing	River Plate

- Apertura champion: Peñarol (3rd title)
  - Top scorer: Juan Manuel Olivera (13 goals)
- Clausura champion: Defensor Sporting (4th title)
  - Top scorer: Matías Alonso
    Liber Quiñones (11 goals each)
- Overall champion: Peñarol (47th title)
  - Top scorer: Juan Manuel Olivera (18 goals)
- International qualifiers:
  - Copa Libertadores:
    - Group Stage: Peñarol and Defensor Sporting
    - Preliminary Round: Nacional
  - Copa Sudamericana:
    - First Stage: Peñarol, River Plate, M. Wanderers and El Tanque Sisley
- Relegated: Progreso, Bella Vista and Central Español

=== Segunda División ===
Atenas	Boston River	Cerrito	Deportivo Maldonado	Huracán
Miramar Misiones	Plaza Colonia	Rocha	Rampla Juniors	Rentistas
Torque	Sud América	Tacuarembó	Villa Teresa	

- Segunda División champion: Sud América (7th title)
- Play-off winner: Miramar Misiones
- Promoted: Sud América, Rentistas and Miramar Misiones
  - Top scorer: Guillermo Maidana (16 goals)
- Relegated: Huracán

=== Segunda División Amateur ===
Albion	Alto Perú	Basañez	Canadian
Colón	La Luz	Mar de Fondo	Oriental
Platense	Potencia	Salus	Uruguay Montevideo

- Segunda División Amateur champion: Canadian
- Promoted: Canadian (1st title)
- Desafiliated: TBD

== Clubs in international competitions ==
Team \ Competition	2012 Copa Sudamericana	2013 Copa Libertadores
Cerro Largo	First Stage	did not qualify
Danubio	First Stage	did not qualify
Defensor Sporting	did not qualify	First Stage
Liverpool	Round of 16	did not qualify
Nacional	Second Stage	Second Stage
Peñarol	did not qualify	Second Stage

=== Cerro Largo ===
2012 Copa Sudamericana

26 July 2012 First Stage	Aurora (Bolivia)	2–1	(Uruguay) Cerro Largo	Cochabamba, Bolivia
20:30 UTC-04:00	Rodríguez 40'; Castellón 64'	Report	Ruiz (yellow card) 69'; Castillo (yellow card) 79'; Barboza 86'	Stadium: Estadio Félix Capriles; Attendance: 10,000; Referee: Ulises Mereles (Paraguay)

14 August 2012 First Stage	Cerro Largo (Uruguay)	0–0	(Bolivia) Aurora	Melo, Uruguay
18:30 UTC-03:00	Ruiz (yellow card) 45+2'; Castillo (yellow card) 90+3'	Report	Angulo (yellow card) 16'; Cedrola (yellow card) 45'; D. Blanco (yellow card) 66'; Robles (yellow card) 90'; Lanz (yellow card) 90+1'	Stadium: Estadio Arquitecto Ubilla; Attendance: 9,000; Referee: Saúl Laverni (Argentina)

Cerro Largo eliminated on points 1–4.

=== Danubio ===
2013 Copa Libertadores

24 July 2012 Firs Stage	Danubio (Uruguay)	11–0	(Paraguay) Olimpia	Montevideo, Uruguay
19:15 UTC-03:00	Cayetano (yellow card) 6'	Report	Paredes (yellow card) 32'; R. Ortíz (yellow card) 36'; Candía (yellow card) 52'	Stadium: Estadio Luis Franzini; Attendance: 200,000; Referee: Sandro Ricci (Brazil)

7 August 2012 First Stage	Olimpia (Paraguay)	2–1	(Uruguay) Danubio	Asunción, Paraguay
20:45 UTC-04:00	R. Ortíz (yellow card) 4'; Aranda 40'; Salgueiro 44'	Report	Carboni 22'; Fernández (yellow card) 60'; Cayetano (red card) 78'	Stadium: Estadio Manuel Ferreira; Attendance: 18,000; Referee: Diego Abal (Argentina)

Danubio eliminated on points 1–4.

=== Defensor Sporting ===
2013 Copa Libertadors

Defensor Sporting is already qualified for the 2012 Copa Libertadores.

=== Liverpool ===
2012 Copa Sudamericana

25 July 2012 First Stage	Liverpool (Uruguay)	3–0	(Bolivia) Universitario	Montevideo, Uruguay
19:15 UTC-03:00	Núñez 11', 21' (yellow card) 76'; Pezzolano 18' (pen.); Aguirre (yellow card) 49'	Report	Liendo (yellow card) 13'; Braz (yellow card) 25'; Flores (yellow card) 66'; Bejarano 90+2'	Stadium: Estadio Luis Franzini; Attendance: 8,000; Referee: Julio Bascuñán (Chile)

16 August 2012 First Stage	Universitario (Bolivia)	1–2	(Uruguay) Liverpool	Sucre, Bolivia
18:00 UTC-04:00	Fierro (yellow card) 1'; Liendo (yellow card) 11'; Torrez (yellow card) 42'; Escalante 52' (pen.); Braz (yellow card) 58'	Report	Felipe (yellow card) 3'; Ferreira 70'; Scarone 73'	Stadium: Estadio Olímpico Patria; Attendance: 20,000; Referee: Marlon Escalante (Venezuela)

28 August 2012 Second Stage	Envigado (Colombia)	1–1	(Uruguay) Liverpool	Envigado, Colombia
19:45UTC-05:00	J. Mejía 21'; J. Mosquera (yellow card) 40'; Morantes (yellow card) 46' (yellow-red card) 81'; Mendoza (yellow card) 86'; Angulo (yellow card) 90'	Report	Tamareo (yellow card) 38'; Felipe (yellow card) 43'; Melo (yellow card) 46'; Aguirre 86'	Stadium: Estadio Polideportivo Sur; Attendance: 8,000; Referee: Juan Soto (Venezuela)

19 September 2012 Second Stage	Liverpool (Uruguay)	1–0	(Colombia) Envigado	Montevideo, Uruguay
20:15 UTC-03:00	Semperena (yellow card) 10'; Núñez 30'; Aguirre (yellow card) 48'; Felipe (yellow card) 51'	Report	J. Mosquera (yellow card) 10'; Orozco (yellow card) 29'; Mejía (yellow card) 70'	Stadium: Estadio Luis Franzini; Attendance: 10,000; Referee: Julio Quintana (Paraguay)

25 September 2012 Round of 16	Independiente (Argentina)	2–1	(Uruguay) Liverpool	Avellaneda, Argentina
21:30UTC-03:00	Vargas 6'; Galeano (yellow card) 36'; Rosales 49'; Cáceres (yellow card) 56'	Report	Mansilla (yellow card) 32'; Núñez 85'	Stadium: Estadio Libertadores de América; Attendance: 20,000; Referee: José Buitrago (Colombia)

25 October 2012 Round of 16	Liverpool (Uruguay)	2–1	(Argentina) Independiente	Montevideo, Uruguay
20:15UTC-03:00	Ferreira (yellow card) 33'; Núñez 43'; Silvera (yellow card) 51'; Semperena (yellow card) 55' (yellow-red card) 79'	Report	Vallés (yellow card) 40'; Mancuello 48' (yellow card) 77'; Battión 90+2'	Stadium: Estadio Centenario; Attendance: 26,000; Referee: Carlos Vera (Ecuador)

Liverpool eliminated on points 6–0.

=== Nacional ===
2012 Copa Sudamericana

31 July 2012 First Stage	Iquique (Chile)	2–0	(Uruguay) Nacional	Iquique, Chile
18:00 UTC-04:00	Ereros 40'; Dávila 60'	Report	Torres (yellow card) 43'; Damonte (yellow card) 65'	Stadium: Estadio Tierra de Campeones; Attendance: 7,000; Referee: Enrique Cáceres (Paraguay)

14 August 2012 First Stage	Nacional (Uruguay)	4–0	(Chile) Iquique	Montevideo, Uruguay
21:00 UTC-03:00	Rolín 6'; Medina (yellow card) 27'; Bueno 45+1'; Recoba 85'; A. Romero (yellow card) 89' (yellow-red card) 90+1'; Vecino 90+2'	Report	Taucare (yellow card) 34' (yellow-red card) 83'; Bogado (yellow card) 78'	Stadium: Estadio Centenario; Attendance: 50,000; Referee: Paulo César de Oliveira (Brazil)

29 August 2012 Second Stage	LDU Loja (Ecuador)	0–1	(Uruguay) Nacional	Loja, Ecuador
17:15 UTC-05:00	Fábio Renato (yellow card) 63'; Fernández (yellow card) 86'	Report	Medina (yellow card) 22'; Taborda 61'	Stadium: Estadio Federativo Reina del Cisne; Attendance: 5,000; Referee: Georges Buckley (Peru)

19 September 2012 Second Stage	Nacional (Uruguay)	1–2	(Ecuador) LDU Loja	Montevideo, Uruguay
20:15 UTC-03:00	Luna 23'; Píriz (yellow card) 34'; Cabrera (yellow card) 82'	Report	Calderón (yellow card) 14' (goal) 78'; Uchuari 21'; Mosquera (yellow card) 39'; Vera (yellow card) 40'; Hurtado (yellow card) 68'	Stadium: Estadio Centenario; Attendance: 32,000; Referee: Patricio Polic (Chile)

Nacional eliminated on away goals.

2013 Copa Libertadors

Nacional is already qualified for the 2012 Copa Libertadores.

== National teams ==
=== Senior team ===
This section covers Uruguay's senior team matches from the end of the 2012 Summer Olympics until the end of the 2013 FIFA Confederations Cup.

==== Friendly matches ====
15 August 2012	France	0–0	Uruguay	Le Havre, France
21:00 UTC+02:00	Martin (yellow card) 66'; Capoue (yellow card) 79'	Report	Á. Pereira (yellow card) 39'; Lugano (yellow card) 48'; Pérez (yellow card) 82'	Stadium: Stade Océane; Attendance: 25,000; Referee: Daniele Orsato (Italy)

14 November 2012	Poland	1–3	Uruguay	Gdańsk, Poland
16:45 UTC-03:00	Glik 22' (o.g.); Wasilewski (yellow card) 25'; Obraniak 64'	Report	Cavani 34'; Suárez 66'	Stadium: PGE Arena; Attendance: 39,460; Referee: Willie Collum (Scotland)

6 February 2013	Spain	3–1	Uruguay	Qatar, Doha
19:00 CET	Fàbregas 16'; Busquets (yellow card) 22'; Pedro 51', 74'; Ramos (yellow card) 56'; Alba (yellow card) 56'	Report	Rodríguez 32'; Pérez (yellow card) 56'	Stadium: Khalifa International Stadium; Attendance: 48,000; Referee: Fahad Al-Marri (Qatar)

5 June 2013	Uruguay	1–0	France	Montevideo, Uruguay
17:00 UTC-3	Suárez 50'			Stadium: Estadio Centenario

==== World Cup qualifiers ====
7 September 2012 Round 7	Colombia	4–0	Uruguay	Barranquilla, Colombia
15:30 UTC-05:00	Falcao 2'; Gutiérrez 47', 52'; Zúñiga 90+1'	Report	Gargano (yellow card) 82'	Stadium: Estadio Metropolitano Roberto Meléndez; Attendance: 454,000; Referee: Héber Lopes (Brazil)

11 September 2012 Round 8	Uruguay	1–1	Ecuador	Montevideo, Uruguay
18:30 UTC-03:00	Lugano (yellow card) 7'; Á. Pereira (yellow card) 36'; Suárez (yellow card) 55'; Cavani 67'; Ramírez (yellow card) 90+2'	Report	Caidedo 8' (pen.); Minda (yellow card) 9'; Campos (yellow card) 22'; Domínguez (yellow card) 23'; Benítez (yellow card) 61'; Valencia (yellow card) 75' (yellow-red card) 90+3'	Stadium: Estadio Centenario; Attendance: 60,000; Referee: Carlos Amarilla (Paraguay)

12 October 2012 Round 9	Argentina	3–0	Uruguay	Mendoza, Argentina
21:00 UTC−3	Messi 65', 79'; Agüero 74'	Report	Cáceres (yellow card) 32'; Lugano (yellow card) 52'; Godín (yellow card) 79'; M. Pereira (yellow card) 89'	Stadium: Estadio Malvinas Argentinas; Attendance: 31,997; Referee: Leandro Vuaden (Brazil)

16 October 2012 Round 10	Bolivia	4–1	Uruguay	La Paz, Bolivia
16:00 UTC−4	Saucedo 5', 50', 54'; Mojica 26'; Raldes (yellow card) 67'; Chumacero (yellow card) 73'	Report	Á. Pereira (yellow card) 33'; Suárez 80'	Stadium: Estadio Hernando Siles; Attendance: 25,402; Referee: Víctor Hugo Rivera (Peru)

22 March 2013 Round 11	Uruguay	1-1	Paraguay	Montevideo, Uruguay
--:-- UTC-03:00				Stadium: Estadio Centenario

26 March 2013 Round 12	Chile	2-0	Uruguay	Santiago, Chile
--:-- UTC-04:00				Stadium: Estadio Nacional

11 June 2013 Round 13	Venezuela	0–1	Uruguay	Ciudad Guayana, Venezuela
19:30 UTC-04:30		Report	Cavani 28'	Stadium: Estadio Polideportivo Cachamay; Referee: Paulo Oliveira (Brazil)

==== Confederations Cup ====
16 June 2013 Group Stage	Spain	2 – 1	Uruguay	Recife, Brazil
19:00 UTC-03:00	Pedro 20'; Soldado 32'	Report	Suárez 88'	Stadium: Arena Pernambuco; Attendance: 41,705; Referee: Yuichi Nishimura (Japan)

20 June 2013 Group Stage	Nigeria	1 – 2	Uruguay	Salvador, Brazil
19:00 UTC-03:00	Mikel 37'	Report	Lugano 19'; Forlán 51'	Stadium: Arena Fonte Nova; Attendance: 26,769; Referee: Björn Kuipers (Netherlands)

23 June 2013 Group Stage	Uruguay	8 – 0	Tahiti	Recife, Brazil
16:00 UTC-03:00	Hernández 2', 24', 45+1', 67' (pen.); Pérez 27'; Lodeiro 61'; Suárez 82', 90'	Report		Stadium: Arena Pernambuco; Attendance: 22,047; Referee: Pedro Proença (Portugal)

26 June 2013 Semi-finals	Brazil	2 – 1	Uruguay	Belo Horizonte, Brazil
16:00 UTC-03:00	Fred 41'; Paulinho 86'	Report	Cavani 48'	Stadium: Estádio Mineirão; Attendance: 57,483; Referee: Enrique Osses (Chile)

30 June 2013 2013 FIFA Confederations Cup	Uruguay	2–2 (a.e.t.) (2–3 p)	Italy	Arena Fonte Nova, Salvador
13:00	Cavani 58', 78'	Report	Astori 24'; Diamanti 73'	Attendance: 43,382; Referee: Djamel Haimoudi (Algeria)
	Penalties
	Forlán (penalty missed); Cavani (penalty scored); Suárez (penalty scored); Cáceres (penalty missed); Gargano (penalty missed)		(penalty scored) Aquilani; (penalty scored) El Shaarawy; (penalty missed) De Sciglio; (penalty scored) Giaccherini

=== Uruguay U-20 ===
==== Friendly matches ====
5 September 2012	Uruguay	2–0	Paraguay	Montevideo, Uruguay
15:30 UTC-03:00	César 46'; Varela (red card) 69'; Rolán 75'	Report	Caballero (red card) 69'	Stadium: Parque Federico Omar Saroldi; Attendance: 300; Referee: Leodán González (Uruguay)

8 September 2012	Uruguay	1–1	Paraguay	Montevideo, Uruguay
15:30 UTC-03:00	Mastriani (yellow card) 72' (goal) 90+4'	Report	Almirón (yellow card) 29'; Gómez (yellow card) 52'; Domínguez 54'	Stadium: Estadio Gran Parque Central; Attendance: 400; Referee: Leodán González (Uruguay)

9 October 2012	Uruguay	0–0	Peru	Montevideo, Uruguay
15:30 UTC-03:00		Report	Ortiz (red card) 63'	Stadium: Estadio Parque Capurro; Attendance: 220; Referee: Daniel Fedorczuk (Uruguay)

11 October 2012	Uruguay	2–1	Peru	Montevideo, Uruguay
16:00 UTC-03:00	César 18'; Laxalt 49'	Report	Hinostroza (red card) 32'; Polo 63'	Stadium: Estadio Luis Franzini; Referee: Héctor Martínez (Uruguay)

27 November 2012	Paraguay	2–2	Uruguay	Capiatá, Paraguay
--:-- UTC-03:30	Giménez 85'; Formiliano 91' (o.g.)	Report	Formiliano 44'; De Arrascaeta 48'	Stadium: Estadio Deportivo Capiatá; Referee: Enrique Cáceres (Paraguay)

=== World Cup qualifiers ===
10 January 2013 First Stage	Uruguay	3–3	Peru	San Juan, Argentina
22:15 (UTC-03:00)	López 40'; Bentancourt 53'; Rolán 55'		Reyna 19'; Gómez 44'; Benavente 87' (pen.)	Stadium: Estadio del Bicentenario; Attendance: 400; Referee: Enrique Cáceres (Paraguay)

12 January 2013 First Stage	Brazil	2–3	Uruguay	San Juan, Argentina
20:00 (UTC-03:00)	Fred 70'; Marcos Júnior 72'	Report	Laxalt 5'; Rolán 47' (pen.); López 90'	Stadium: Estadio del Bicentenario; Attendance: 300; Referee: Patricio Loustau (Argentina)

14 January 2013 First Stage	Uruguay	2–2	Ecuador	San Juan, Argentina
22:15 (UTC-03:00)	López 19'; Aguirre 85'	Report	Esterilla 46'; Grueso 55'	Stadium: Estadio del Bicentenario; Attendance: 1,000; Referee: José Buitrago (Colombia)

18 January 2013 First Stage	Uruguay	2–2	Venezuela	San Juan, Argentina
17:45 (UTC-03:00)	Rolán 25' (pen.); López 59'	Report	Martínez 20'; Añor 47'	Stadium: Estadio del Bicentenario; Attendance: 5,000; Referee: Julio Bascuñán (Chile)

20 January 2013 Final stage	Peru	1–3	Uruguay	Mendoza, Argentina
19:45 (UTC-03:00)	Reyna 42'	Report	Formiliano 12'; López 68'; Rolán 88'	Stadium: Estadio Malvinas Argentinas; Attendance: 1,000; Referee: Carlos Vera (Ecuador)

23 January 2013 Final stage	Colombia	1–0	Uruguay	Mendoza, Argentina
22:00 (UTC-03:00)	Córdoba 38'	Report		Stadium: Estadio Malvinas Argentinas; Attendance: 2,400; Referee: Sandro Ricci (Brazil)

27 January 2013 Final stage	Chile	0–1	Uruguay	Mendoza, Argentina
17:30 (UTC-03:00)		Report	Bueno 64'	Stadium: Estadio Malvinas Argentinas; Attendance: 5,000; Referee: Marlon Escalante (Venezuela)

30 January 2013 Final stage	Paraguay	1–0	Uruguay	Mendoza, Argentina
22:00 (UTC-03:00)	Alonso 59'	Report		Stadium: Estadio Malvinas Argentinas; Attendance: 3,000; Referee: Sandro Ricci (Brazil)

3 February 2013 Final stage	Uruguay	1–0	Ecuador	Mendoza, Argentina
17:15 (UTC-03:00)	López 5'	Report		Stadium: Estadio Malvinas Argentinas; Attendance: 7,000; Referee: José Buitrago (Colombia)

=== Uruguay U-17 ===
==== Friendly matches ====
2 October 2012	Uruguay	v	Chile	Uruguay
--:-- UTC-03:00

4 October 2012	Uruguay	v	Chile	Uruguay
--:-- UTC-03:00

===== Copa Backus =====
Team	Pld	W	W	L	GF	GA	GD	Pts
Uruguay	1	1	0	0	222	0	+222	3
Paraguay	1	1	0	0	3	2	+1	3
Peru	1	0	0	1	2	3	–1	0
Costa Rica	1	0	0	1	1	3	–2	0

18 September 2012	Uruguay	8–3	Paraguay	Lima, Peru
13:45 UTC-05:00	D'Albenas 72'; Ospitaleche 89'	Report	M. González 34' (yellow card) 39'; Medina 80'; Duarte 87'; Tandi (yellow card) 89'	Stadium: Estadio San Martín; Attendance: 500; Referee: Víctor Hugo Rivera (Peru)

20 September 2012	Uruguay	3–1	Costa Rica	Lima, Peru
13:45 UTC-05:00	Benítez; Buschiazzo; Latorre	Report		Stadium: Club Regatas

22 September 2012	Peru	2–3	Uruguay	Lima, Peru
11:00 UTC-05:00	Da Silva; González	Report		Stadium: Complejo F.P.F.

===== Limoge's International tournament =====
Team	Pld	W	D	L	GF	GA	GD	Pts
France	3	2	1	0	10	2	+8	7
Portugal	3	2	1	0	7	2	+5	7
Uruguay	3	1	0	2	2	9	-7	3
Norway	3	0	0	3	3	9	-6	0

31 October 2012	France	4–0	Uruguay	Limoges, France
--:-- UTC+02:00	Jean 28'; Saïd 51'; Etcheverry 62' (o.g.); Ongenda 83'	Report		Stadium: Stade Beaublanc

2 November 2012	Portugal	4–0	Uruguay	Limoges, France
--:-- UTC+02:00	Nunes 31'; Alfaiate 43'; Santos 48'; Guzzo 61'	Report		Stadium: Stade Beaublanc

4 November 2012	Norway	1–2	Uruguay	Limoges, France
--:-- UTC+02:00	Skanes 52'	Report	D´Álbenas 57'; González 72'	Stadium: Stade Beaublanc
