= 2012–13 Club Atlético Independiente season =

Independiente
2012–13 season
- President: Javier Cantero
- Manager: Américo Gallego (until 13 April 2013)
- Stadium: Estadio Libertadores de América
- Torneo Inicial: N/A
- Torneo Final: N/A
- Copa Argentina: Round of 64
- Copa Sudamericana: Round of 32
Home colours	Away colours

Club Atlético Independiente's 2012–13 season is the club's 107th year of existence. Independiente this season going to play the Torneo Inicial, the Torneo Final, the Copa Sudamericana and the Copa Argentina.

== Squad ==
No.	Name	Nationality	Position	Date of birth (age)	Signed from	Notes
1	Hilario Navarro	(Argentina)	GK	November 14, 1980 (age 45)	(Argentina) San Lorenzo	
2	Cristian Tula	(Argentina)	DF	January 28, 1978 (age 48)	(Colombia) Atlético Nacional	
3	Claudio Morel Rodríguez	(Paraguay)	DF	February 2, 1978 (age 48)	(Spain) Deportivo de La Coruña	
4	Nicolás Villagra	(Argentina)	DF		The Academy	
5	Roberto Battión	(Argentina)	MF	March 1, 1982 (age 44)	(Argentina) Banfield	
6	Eduardo Tuzzio	(Argentina)	DF	July 31, 1974 (age 52)	(Argentina) River Plate	
7	Luciano Leguizamón	(Argentina)	FW	July 1, 1982 (age 44)	(Argentina) Arsenal	
8	Hernán Fredes	(Argentina)	MF	March 27, 1987 (age 39)	(Ukraine) Metalist Kharkiv	
9	Ernesto Farías	(Argentina)	FW	May 29, 1980 (age 46)	(Brazil) Cruzeiro	
10	Daniel Montenegro	(Argentina)	MF	March 28, 1979 (age 47)	(Mexico) América	
11	Osmar Ferreyra	(Argentina)	MF	January 9, 1983 (age 43)	(Ukraine) Dnipro Dnipropetrovsk	
12	Adrián Gabbarini	(Argentina)	GK	October 10, 1985 (age 40)	The Academy	
13	Alexis Zárate	(Argentina)	DF	June 25, 1992 (age 34)	The Academy	
14	Fabián Monserrat	(Argentina)	MF	May 8, 1994 (age 32)	The Academy	
15	Fernando Godoy	(Argentina)	MF	May 1, 1990 (age 36)	The Academy	
17	Diego Rodríguez	(Argentina)	GK	June 25, 1989 (age 37)	The Academy	
18	Julián Velázquez	(Argentina)	DF	October 23, 1990 (age 35)	The Academy	
19	Jonathan Santana	(Paraguay)	MF	October 19, 1981 (age 44)	(Paraguay) Club Libertad	
20	Juan Fernando Caicedo	(Colombia)	MF	July 13, 1989 (age 37)	(Colombia) Deportes Quindío	
21	Fabián Assman	(Argentina)	GK	March 23, 1986 (age 40)	(Spain) Las Palmas	
22	Fabián Vargas	(Colombia)	MF	April 17, 1980 (age 46)	(Greece) AEK Athens	
23	Federico Mancuello	(Argentina)	MF	March 26, 1989 (age 37)	(Argentina) Belgrano	
24	Federico Gay	(Argentina)	DF	March 3, 1991 (age 35)	The Academy	
25	Patricio Vidal	(Argentina)	MF	April 8, 1992 (age 34)	(Argentina) Santiago Morning	
26	Francisco Pizzini	(Argentina)	FW	September 19, 1993 (age 33)	The Academy	
26	Leonel Galeano	(Argentina)	DF	August 3, 1991 (age 35)	The Academy	
28	Gabriel Vallés	(Argentina)	DF	May 3, 1986 (age 40)	(Argentina) Godoy Cruz	
29	Martín Benítez	(Argentina)	FW	June 17, 1994 (age 32)	The Academy	
30	Facundo Daffonchio	(Argentina)	GK	January 1, 1990 (age 36)	The Academy	
31	Lucas Villafáñez	(Argentina)	MF	October 4, 1991 (age 35)	(Argentina) CAI	
33	Leonel Miranda	(Argentina)	DF	January 7, 1994 (age 32)	The Academy	
34	Samuel Cáceres	(Paraguay)	DF	February 20, 1989 (age 37)	(Argentina) Nueva Chicago	
38	Sergio Ojeda	(Argentina)	DF	January 4, 1994 (age 32)	The Academy	
39	Gonzalo Contrera	(Argentina)	DF	March 20, 1994 (age 32)	The Academy	
40	Eloy Rodríguez	(Argentina)	DF	May 3, 1993 (age 33)	The Academy	
	Paulo Rosales	(Argentina)	MF	January 10, 1984 (age 42)	(Argentina) Union	Out in January 2013
	Roberto Russo	(Argentina)	DF	June 19, 1982 (age 44)	(Argentina) Godoy Cruz	Out in January 2013
	Víctor Zapata	(Argentina)	MF	January 20, 1979 (age 47)	(Argentina) Vélez Sarsfield	Out in January 2013
	Diego Churín	(Argentina)	FW	December 1, 1989 (age 36)	(Argentina) Comunicaciones	Out in January 2013

=== Winter transfers ===
Players In
Name	Nat	Pos	Moving from
Samuel Cáceres	ARG	DF	(Argentina) Nueva Chicago
Luciano Leguizamón	ARG	FW	(Argentina) Arsenal
Federico Mancuello	ARG	MF	(Argentina) Belgrano
Claudio Marcelo Morel Rodríguez	PAR	DF	(Spain) Deportivo
Paulo Rosales	ARG	MF	(Argentina) Union
Roberto Russo	ARG	DF	(Argentina) Godoy Cruz
Jonathan Santana	PAR	MF	(Paraguay) Libertad
Cristian Tula	ARG	DF	(Colombia) Atlético Nacional
Fabián Vargas	COL	MF	(Greece) AEK Athens
Víctor Zapata	ARG	MF	(Argentina) Vélez Sarsfield

Players Out
Name	Nat	Pos	Moving to
Adrián Argachá	URU	DF	(Argentina) Racing Club de Montevideo
Cristian Báez	PAR	DF	(Argentina) Huracán
Ignacio Barcia	ARG	DF	(Argentina) Club Atlético San Telmo
Walter Busse	ARG	MF	(Argentina) Huracán
Gino Clara	ARG	FW	(Argentina) Los Andes de Lomas de Zamora
Matías Defederico	ARG	MF	(Argentina) Huracán
Nicolás Delmonte	ARG	MF	(Argentina) Instituto
Fernando Elizari	ARG	FW	(Argentina) Quilmes
Lucas Kruspzky	ARG	DF	(Argentina) Arsenal
Carlos Matheu	ARG	DF	(Italy) Atalanta B.C.
Brian Nieva	ARG	FW	(Argentina) Los Andes de Lomas de Zamora
Leonel Núñez	ARG	FW	(Argentina) Argentinos Juniors
Facundo Parra	ARG	FW	(Italy) Atalanta B.C.
Cristian Pellerano	ARG	MF	(Mexico) Tijuana
Jorge Perez	ARG	MF	(Argentina) Banfield
Patricio Rodríguez	ARG	MF	(Brazil) Santos FC
Gabriel Milito	ARG	DF	Retirado

=== Summer transfers ===
Players In
Name	Nat	Pos	Moving from
Daniel Montenegro	ARG	DF	(Mexico) América
Juan Fernando Caicedo	COL	FW	(Colombia) Deportes Quindío

Players Out
Name	Nat	Pos	Moving to
Roberto Russo	ARG	DF	(Argentina) Nueva Chicago
Paulo Rosales	ARG	DF	(Brazil) Esporte Clube Bahia
Diego Churín	ARG	MF	(Chile) Curicó
Víctor Zapata	ARG	DF	Free Agent

== Competitions ==
=== Avellaneda derby friendlies ===
29 July 2012 First leg	Racing Club	0-0	Independiente	Avellaneda, Argentina
--:-- UTC−03:00		Report		Stadium: Estadio Juan Domingo Perón; Attendance: 13000; Referee: Mauro Vigliano

=== Copa Sudamericana ===
22 August 2012 Second stage First Leg	(Argentina) Boca Juniors	3-3	(Argentina) Independiente	Buenos Aires, Argentina
19:30 UTC−03:00	Silva 15'; Somoza 45'; Sánchez Miño 76'; Schiavi (yellow card) 27'; Ledesma (yellow card) 36'; Somoza (yellow card) 41'; Schiavi (red card) 51'; D’Angelo (yellow card) 85'; Rodríguez (yellow card) 90'		Santana 44'; Rosales 48'; Farías 90'; Galeano (yellow card) 8'; Morel Rodríguez (yellow card) 43'; Vargas (yellow card) 61'; Russo (yellow card) 68'; Battión (yellow card) 75'	Stadium: Estadio Alberto J. Armando; Referee: Patricio Loustau

29 August 2012 Second stage Second Leg	(Argentina) Independiente	0-0	(Argentina) Boca Juniors	Avellaneda, Argentina
19:30 UTC−03:00	Tuzzio (yellow card) 24'; Tuzzio (red card) 46'; Tula (yellow card) 59'; Ferreyra (yellow card) 75'; Hilario Navarro (yellow card) 82'; Valles (yellow card) 89'		Sánchez Miño (yellow card) 57'; Rodríguez (yellow card) 92'	Stadium: Estadio Libertadores de América; Referee: Patricio Loustau

25 September 2012 Round of 16; First Leg	(Argentina) Independiente	2-1	(Uruguay) Liverpool	Avellaneda, Argentina
21:30 UTC−03:00	Vargas 6'; Rosales 48'		Núñez 80'	Stadium: Estadio Libertadores de América; Referee: José Buitrago (Colombia)

25 October 2012 Round of 16; Second Leg	(Uruguay) Liverpool	1-2	(Argentina) Independiente	Montevideo, Uruguay
20:30 UTC−02:00	Núñez 43'; Ferreira (yellow card) 33'; Silvera (yellow card) 51'; Semperena (yellow card) 55'; Semperena (red card) 83'		Mancuello 48'; Battión 90+1'; Valles (yellow card) 39'; Mancuello (yellow card) 76'	Stadium: Estadio Centenario; Referee: Carlos Vera (Ecuador)

1 November 2012 Quarterfinals; First Leg	(Argentina) Independiente	v	(Chile) Universidad Católica	Avellaneda, Argentina
21:45 UTC−3:00	Tula 44'; Martínez 55' (o.g.)		Andía 2'; Castillo 70'	Stadium: Estadio Libertadores de América

8 November 2012 Quarterfinals; Second Leg	(Chile) Universidad Católica	2-1	(Argentina) Independiente	Santiago, Chile
19:15 UTC−3:00	Ríos 16' (pen.), 38' (pen.)		Santana 35'	Stadium: Estadio San Carlos de Apoquindo

=== Copa Argentina ===
TBD Round of 64	(Argentina) Independiente	v	(Argentina) Boca Unidos / Jorge Gibson Brown
--:-- UTC−03:00

=== Argentine Primera División ===
==== Torneo Inicial ====
4 August 2012 Round 1	Newell's Old Boys	0–0	Independiente	Rosario, Argentina
20:20 UTC−02:20	Sperdutti (yellow card) 15'		Rosales (yellow card) 46'; Morel Rodríguez (yellow card) 61'; Tuzzio (yellow card) 74'	Stadium: Estadio Marcelo Bielsa; Referee: Patricio Loustau

14 August 2012 Round 2	Independiente	0–0	Vélez Sársfield	Avellaneda, Argentina
20:00 UTC−02:00	Morel Rodríguez (yellow card) 54'; Leguizamón (yellow card) 79'		Cerro (yellow card) 51'; Cerro (red card) 70'	Stadium: Estadio Libertadores de América; Referee: Pablo Lunati

19 August 2012 Round 3	Racing	2–0	Independiente	Avellaneda, Argentina
11:00 UTC−03:00	Sand 29', 74'; Camoranesi (yellow card) 46'; Sand (yellow card) 75'		Morel Rodríguez (yellow card) 32'; Morel Rodríguez (red card) 45'; Leguizamón (yellow card) 59'; Vargas (yellow card) 62'; Russo (yellow card) 65'; Rosales (yellow card) 76'	Stadium: Estadio Juan Domingo Perón; Referee: Germán Delfino

25 August 2012 Round 4	Independiente	0–2	Arsenal	Avellaneda, Argentina
20:20 UTC−03:00	Morel Rodríguez (yellow card) 10'; Vargas (yellow card) 17'; Russo (yellow card) 42'; Vargas (red card) 85'		Nervo (yellow card) 10'; Marcone (yellow card) 11'; Ortíz (yellow card) 22'; Braghieri (yellow card) 58'; Campestrini (yellow card) 77'; Tuzzio 83' (o.g.); Benedetto 93'	Stadium: Estadio Libertadores de América; Referee: Diego Ceballos

2 September 2012 Round 5	Godoy Cruz	2–1	Independiente	Mendoza, Argentina
19:20 UTC−03:00	Ceballos (yellow card) 12'; Ramírez 44', 93'; Insua (yellow card) 52'		Tula (yellow card) 14'; Tula 35'; Vallés (yellow card) 43'; Tuzzio (yellow card) 69'; Galeano (yellow card) 89'; Villalba (yellow card) 92'	Stadium: Estadio Malvinas Argentinas; Referee: Sergio Pezzotta

9 September 2012 Round 6	Independiente	1–1	Quilmes	Avellaneda, Argentina
18:15 UTC−03:00	Battión (yellow card) 45'; Farías 52'; Benítez (red card) 69'; Tula (yellow card) 73'; Morel Rodríguez (yellow card) 76'		Mansilla 35'; Lima (yellow card) 45'; Romero (yellow card) 68'; Caneo (yellow card) 87'	Stadium: Estadio Libertadores de América; Referee: Germán Delfino

16 September 2012 Round 7	Boca Juniors	2–1	Independiente	Buenos Aires, Argentina
16:15 UTC−03:00	Rodríguez (yellow card) 16'; Silva 26'; Sánchez Miño (yellow card) 46'; Erviti 63'; Somoza (yellow card) 66'		Caruzzo 22' (o.g.); Morel Rodríguez 28'; Galeano (yellow card) 59'	Stadium: Estadio Alberto J. Armando; Referee: Pablo Lunati

22 September 2012 Round 8	Independiente	1–1	All Boys	Avellaneda, Argentina
20:20 UTC−03:00	Vallés (yellow card) 32'; Galeano (yellow card) 80'; Farías 83'		Coronel (yellow card) 14'; Borghello (yellow card) 43'; Borghello 83'; Soto (yellow card) 90'	Stadium: Estadio Libertadores de América; Referee: Néstor Pitana

30 September 2012 Round 9	Unión	1–2	Independiente	Santa Fé, Argentina
17:15 UTC−03:00	Míguez (yellow card) 40'; Jara (yellow card) 45'; Barisone (yellow card) 47'; Pumpido (red card) 62'; Chiapello (yellow card) 72'		Leguizamón (yellow card) 4'; Farías 28', 49'; Vargas (yellow card) 34'; Velázquez (yellow card) 44'; Battión (yellow card) 46'; Vallés (yellow card) 62'; Navarro (yellow card) 75'	Stadium: Estadio 15 de Abril; Referee: Patricio Loustau

7 October 2012 Round 10	Independiente	2–0	Atlético de Rafaela	Avellaneda, Argentina
17:15 UTC−03:00	Leguizamón 11'; Ferreyra 69'; Ferreyra (yellow card) 69'		Juárez (yellow card) 71'	Stadium: Estadio Libertadores de América; Referee: Mauro Vigliano

19 October 2012 Round 11	Argentinos Juniors	0–1	Independiente	Buenos Aires, Argentina
21:15 UTC−03:00	Capurro (yellow card) 59'; Flores (yellow card) 65'; Placente (yellow card) 70'; Barrera (yellow card) 83'; Iñíguez (yellow card) 90'		Vargas (yellow card) 34'; Zapata (yellow card) 37'; Vallés (yellow card) 45'; Velázquez 66'	Stadium: Estadio Diego Armando Maradona; Referee: Néstor Pitana

3 February 2013 Round 12	Independiente	1 – 1	Tigre	Avellaneda, Argentina
--:-- UTC−03:00				Stadium: Estadio Libertadores de América

5 November 2012 Round 13	Independiente	0 – 2	Lanús	Avellaneda, Argentina
--:-- UTC−03:00				Stadium: Estadio Libertadores de América

11 November 2012 Round 14	San Martín (San Juan)	1 – 1	Independiente	San Juan, Argentina
--:-- UTC−03:00				Stadium: Estadio Ingeniero Hilario Sánchez

14 November 2012 Round 15	Independiente	1 – 2	Belgrano	Avellaneda, Argentina
--:-- UTC−03:00				Stadium: Estadio Libertadores de América

18 November 2012 Round 16	Estudiantes	2 – 0	Independiente	La Plata, Argentina
--:-- UTC−03:00				Stadium: Estadio Ciudad de La Plata

25 November 2012 Round 17	Independiente	2 – 2	River Plate	Avellaneda, Argentina
--:-- UTC−03:00				Stadium: Estadio Libertadores de América

2 December 2012 Round 18	San Lorenzo	2 – 1	Independiente	Buenos Aires, Argentina
--:-- UTC−03:00				Stadium: Estadio Pedro Bidegain

9 December 2012 Round 19	Independiente	2 – 2	Colón	Avellaneda, Argentina
--:-- UTC−03:00				Stadium: Estadio Libertadores de América

==== Torneo Final ====
10 February 2013 Round 1	Independiente	1 – 3	Newell's Old Boys	Avellaneda, Argentina
18:00	Tula 21'		Scocco 17', 77'; Pérez 82'	Stadium: Estadio Libertadores de América; Referee: Juan Pablo Pompei

16 February 2013 Round 2	Velez Sarsfield	0 – 1	Independiente	Buenos Aires, Argentina
21:15			Tula 44'	Stadium: Estadio José Amalfitani; Referee: Pablo Lunati

24 February 2013 Round 3	Independiente	2 – 0	Racing Club	Avellaneda, Argentina
17:00	Miranda 3'; Santana 94'			Stadium: Estadio Libertadores de América; Referee: Diego Abal

2 March 2013 Round 4	Arsenal	1 – 0	Independiente	Sarandí, Argentina
20:15	López 44'			Stadium: Estadio Julio Humberto Grondona; Referee: Mauro Vigliano

8 March 2013 Round 5	Independiente	0 – 1	Godoy Cruz	Avellaneda, Argentina
--:--			Castro 56'	Stadium: Estadio Libertadores de América; Referee: Silvio Trucco

17 March 2013 Round 6	Quilmes	0 – 0	Independiente	Buenos Aires, Argentina
--:--				Stadium: Estadio Centenario Dr. José Luis Meiszner; Referee: Sergio Pezzotta

31 March 2013 Round 7	Independiente	1 – 1	Boca Juniors	Avellaneda, Argentina
--:--	Morel Rodríguez 63'		Silva 38'	Stadium: Estadio Libertadores de América; Referee: Silvio Trucco

7 April 2013 Round 8	All Boys	2 – 0	Independiente	Buenos Aires, Argentina
--:--	Sarmiento 7'; Vildozo 89'			Stadium: Estadio Islas Malvinas; Referee: Sergio Pezzotta

14 April 2013 Round 9	Independiente	1 – 1	Union	Avellaneda, Argentina
--:--	Fernández 4'		Alemán 80'	Stadium: Estadio Libertadores de América

21 April 2013 Round 10	Atletico de Rafaela	2 – 0	Independiente	Santa Fe Province, Argentina
--:--	González 5'; Vera 75'			Stadium: Estadio Nuevo Monumental

28 April 2013 Round 11	Independiente	3 – 1	Argentinos Juniors	Avellaneda, Argentina
--:--	Galeano 52'; Montenegro 78'; Fernández 78'		Lenis 62'	Stadium: Estadio Libertadores de América

5 May 2013 Round 12	Tigre	0 – 2	Independiente	Buenos Aires, Argentina
--:--			Fernández 8', 39'	Stadium: Coloso de Victoria

12 May 2013 Round 13	Lanús	0 – 0	Independiente	Buenos Aires, Argentina
--:--				Stadium: Estadio Ciudad de Lanús

19 May 2013 Round 14	Independiente	3 – 1	San Martín (San Juan)	Avellaneda, Argentina
--:--	Godoy 26'; Caicedo 10', 73'		Osorio Botello 57'	Stadium: Estadio Libertadores de América

26 May 2013 Round 15	Belgrano	0 – 0	Independiente	Córdoba, Argentina
--:--				Stadium: Estadio Julio César Villagra

29 May 2013 Round 16	Independiente	0 – 0	Estudiantes	Avellaneda, Argentina
--:--				Stadium: Estadio Libertadores de América

2 June 2013 Round 17	River Plate	v	Independiente	Buenos Aires, Argentina
--:--				Stadium: Estadio Monumental

16 June 2013 Round 18	Independiente	v	San Lorenzo	Avellaneda, Argentina
--:--				Stadium: Estadio Libertadores de América

23 June 2013 Round 19	Colon	v	Independiente	Santa Fe, Argentina
--:--				Stadium: Estadio Estanislao López

==== Relegation ====
Pos	Team	2010–11 Pts	2011–12 Pts	2012–13 Pts	Total Pts	Total Pld	Avg	Relegation
16	San Lorenzo	47	44	36	127	104	1.221	
17	Quilmes	-	-	32	32	27	1.185	
18	Independiente	43	47	26	116	104	1.115	Relegation to the Primera B Nacional
19	San Martín (San Juan)	-	48	24	72	66	1.091	Relegation to the Primera B Nacional
20	Unión Santa Fe	-	50	17	67	66	1.015	Relegation to the Primera B Nacional

Updated as of the start of the tournament.
