= List of Portuguese football transfers summer 2016 =

This is a list of Portuguese football transfers for the summer of 2016. The summer transfer window will open 1 July and close at midnight on 1 September. Players may be bought before the transfer windows opens, but may only join their new club on 1 July. Only moves involving Primeira Liga clubs are listed. Additionally, players without a club may join a club at any time.

== Transfers ==
Date	Name	Moving from	Moving to	Fee
19 November 2015	Gelson	1º de Agosto	Sporting CP	Undisclosed
2 February 2016	André Carrillo	Sporting CP	Benfica	Free
8 February 2016	Lukas Spalvis	AaB	Sporting CP	Undisclosed
9 February 2016	Matt Jones	Belenenses	Philadelphia Union	Loan
15 March 2016	Diogo Jota	Paços de Ferreira	Atlético Madrid	€2.8m
27 April 2016	Giorgi Makaridze	Feirense	Moreirense	Free
10 May 2016	Renato Sanches	Benfica	Bayern Munich	€35m
15 May 2016	Zé Manuel	Boavista	Porto	Free
17 May 2016	José Moreira	Olhanense	Estoril Praia	Undisclosed
18 May 2016	Kostas Mitroglou	Fulham	Benfica	€7m
19 May 2016	Miguel Layún	Watford	Porto	€6m
19 May 2016	Marcos Valente	Benfica	Vitória de Guimarães	Undisclosed
20 May 2016	Diego Ivo	São Bernardo	Moreirense	Free
21 May 2016	Jander	Desportivo das Aves	Moreirense	Free
22 May 2016	Cauê	Hapoel Tel Aviv	Moreirense	Free
25 May 2016	João Diogo	Marítimo	Belenenses	Undisclosed
25 May 2016	Francisco Soares	Nacional	Vitória Guimarães	Free
25 May 2016	Nolan Mbemba	Lille OSC	Vitória Guimarães	Free
28 May 2016	Talocha	Vizela	Boavista	Free
1 June 2016	André Horta	Vitória de Setúbal	Benfica	Undisclosed
1 June 2016	Hélder Lopes	Paços de Ferreira	Las Palmas	Free
1 June 2016	Pedro Queirós	Astra Giurgiu	Chaves	Undisclosed
2 June 2016	Alan Ruiz	San Lorenzo	Sporting CP	Undisclosed
2 June 2016	Federico Ruiz	Colón	Sporting CP	Undisclosed
3 June 2016	Pedro Coronas	Moreirense	Marítimo	Free
3 June 2016	Vasco Fernandes	Pandurii Târgu Jiu	Vitória de Setúbal	Undisclosed
3 June 2016	Thierry Graça	Benfica B	Estoril	Free
3 June 2016	José Moreira	Olhanense	Estoril	Free
3 June 2016	Luís Ribeiro	Sporting B	Estoril	Free
6 June 2016	Tiago Rodrigues	Porto	Nacional	Loan
8 June 2016	Cafú	Vitória Guimarães	Lorient	Free
8 June 2016	Ricardo	Porto	Chaves	Loan
9 June 2016	João Aurélio	Nacional	Vitória Guimarães	Undisclosed
10 June 2016	Jonathan Rodríguez	Benfica	Santos Laguna	Undisclosed
11 June 2016	Gil Bastião Dias	Monaco	Rio Ave	Loan
12 June 2016	Abel Aguilar	Belenenses	Deportivo Cali	Undisclosed
14 June 2016	João Carlos Teixeira	Liverpool	Porto	Undisclosed
14 June 2016	Randal Oto'o	Braga	Westerlo	Loan
15 June 2016	Felipe	Corinthians	Porto	Undisclosed
15 June 2016	Rafael Miranda da Conceição	Ferroviária	Vitória Guimarães	Undisclosed
16 June 2016	Nelson Bonilla	Zira	Nacional	€100k
16 June 2016	Nicolás Gaitán	Benfica	Atlético Madrid	€25m
16 June 2016	André Schembri	Omonia	Boavista	Undisclosed
17 June 2016	Rafael Amorim	Belenenses	Tondela	Undisclosed
17 June 2016	Rafael Crivellaro	Wisła Kraków	Arouca	Undisclosed
17 June 2016	Okacha Hamzaoui	Béjaïa	Nacional	Undisclosed
17 June 2016	Peterson Peçanha	Viitorul Constanța	Feirense	Undisclosed
20 June 2016	Claude Gonçalves	Ajaccio	Tondela	Undisclosed
20 June 2016	Joãozinho	Braga	Kortrijk	Undisclosed
20 June 2016	Rafael Lopes	Académica	Chaves	Free
21 June 2016	Boubacar Fofana	Nacional	Al-Ettifaq	Undisclosed
21 June 2016	João Traquina	Belenenses	Académica	Free
22 June 2016	Komnen Andrić	Beograd	Belenenses	Undisclosed
22 June 2016	Branimir Kalaica	Dinamo Zagreb B	Benfica	Free
22 June 2016	Nuno Santos	Tondela	Académica	Free
23 June 2016	José Pedro Gonçalves Costa	Braga	Académica	Undisclosed
23 June 2016	Fernando Llorente Mañas	Poli Timișoara	Belenenses	Undisclosed
24 June 2016	Vitor Costa	Internacional de Lages	Arouca	Undisclosed
24 June 2016	Jaílson	Arouca	Tondela	Undisclosed
27 June 2016	Konstantin Bazelyuk	CSKA Moscow	Estoril Praia	Loan
27 June 2016	Vítor Bruno	Cluj	Feirense	Undisclosed
28 June 2016	Bryan Cristante	Benfica	Pescara	Loan
28 June 2016	Tobias Figueiredo	Sporting CP	Nacional	Loan
29 June 2016	Luis Aguiar	Peñarol	Braga	Undisclosed
29 June 2016	Luís Aurélio	Nacional	Feirense	Free
29 June 2016	Pedro Guerreiro de Jesus Correia	Vitória Guimarães	Académica	Undisclosed
29 June 2016	David Ramírez	Saprissa	Moreirense	Loan
1 July 2016	Daniel Candeias	Benfica	Alanyaspor	Loan
1 July 2016	Fabiano	Porto	Fenerbahçe	Loan
1 July 2016	Freire	Apollon Limassol	Chaves	Undisclosed
1 July 2016	Ricardo Janota	Académico de Viseu	Tondela	Undisclosed
2 July 2016	Guillermo Celis	Junior	Benfica	Undisclosed
2 July 2016	Nuno Santos	Benfica	Vitória Setúbal	Loan
2 July 2016	Bruno Varela	Benfica B	Vitória Setúbal	Undisclosed
2 July 2016	Hassan Yebda	Al-Fujairah	Belenenses	Free
4 July 2016	David Bruno	Porto	Tondela	Loan
4 July 2016	Felipe Aliste Lopes	Wolfsburg	Chaves	Free
4 July 2016	Pedro Rebocho	Benfica B	Moreirense	Undisclosed
4 July 2016	Dmytro Yarchuk	Hirnyk-Sport Komsomolsk	Estoril Praia	Free
5 July 2016	Ricardo Horta	Málaga	Braga	Loan
5 July 2016	Kiko	Vitória de Setúbal	Port Vale	Free
5 July 2016	Hadi Sacko	Sporting CP	Leeds United	Loan
5 July 2016	Paulo Tavares	Vitória de Setúbal	Port Vale	Free
5 July 2016	Andrija Živković	Partizan	Benfica	Undisclosed
6 July 2016	Oscar Benítez	Lanús	Benfica	Undisclosed
6 July 2016	Elnur Jafarov	Khazar Lankaran	Tondela	Undisclosed
6 July 2016	Vitali Lystsov	Benfica B	Tondela	Undisclosed
6 July 2016	Lazar Rosić	Vojvodina	Braga	Undisclosed
7 July 2016	Fábio Cardoso	Benfica B	Vitória de Setúbal	Undisclosed
7 July 2016	Miguel Filipe Nunes Cardoso	Deportivo La Coruña	Tondela	Undisclosed
8 July 2016	Jean Cléber	CSA	Marítimo	Undisclosed
8 July 2016	Marlon de Jesús	Monterrey	Arouca	Loan
8 July 2016	Leandrinho	Santos	Rio Ave	Undisclosed
8 July 2016	Nemanja Petrović	Partizan	Chaves	Undisclosed
12 July 2016	Bebé	Benfica	Eibar	Undisclosed
12 July 2016	Derley	Benfica	Chiapas	Loan
12 July 2016	Romain Salin	Marítimo	EA Guingamp	Undisclosed
12 July 2016	Pedro Trigueira	Académica de Coimbra	Vitória de Setúbal	Undisclosed
13 July 2016	Dalbert Henrique	Vitória Guimarães	Nice	Undisclosed
13 July 2016	Paweł Kieszek	Estoril Praia	Córdoba	Undisclosed
13 July 2016	Duckens Nazon	Stade Laval	Tondela	Undisclosed
13 July 2016	Alassane També	Genoa	Tondela	Undisclosed
13 July 2016	Alex Telles	Galatasaray	Porto	€6.5m
13 July 2016	Gustavo Tocantins	Corinthians	Estoril Praia	Undisclosed
14 July 2016	Bruno	Ironi Kiryat Shmona	Tondela	Loan
15 July 2016	João Pedro Gomes Camacho	Nacional	Celta Viga B	Loan
15 July 2016	Paulo Henrique Carneiro Filho	Shanghai Greenland Shenhua	Estoril Praia	Loan
15 July 2016	Pité	Porto B	Tondela	Loan
16 July 2016	Léo Bonatini	Estoril Praia	Al-Hilal	Undisclosed
17 July 2016	Benjamín Ubierna	Juan Aurich	Moreirense	Undisclosed
18 July 2016	Diego Lopes	Benfica	América Mineiro	Loan
19 July 2016	Jhonder Cádiz	Caracas	Nacional	Undisclosed
19 July 2016	Eliseu Cassamá	Reus	Rio Ave	Undisclosed
19 July 2016	César	Benfica	Nacional	Loan
19 July 2016	Hamdou Elhouni	Benfica	Chaves	Loan
19 July 2016	Georgemy Gonçalves	Cruzeiro	Vitória Guimarães	Loan
20 July 2016	Ryan Gauld	Sporting CP	Vitória de Setúbal	Loan
20 July 2016	André Geraldes	Sporting CP	Vitória de Setúbal	Loan
20 July 2016	Zé Manuel	Porto	Vitória de Setúbal	Loan
20 July 2016	Moussa Marega	Porto	Vitória Guimarães	Loan
20 July 2016	Pedro Manuel Mota Pinto	Leixões	Vitória de Setúbal	Undisclosed
21 July 2016	Lucas	Hamilton Academical	Boavista	Free
22 July 2016	Filip Đuričić	Benfica	Sampdoria	Loan
22 July 2016	Bruno Gomes	Internacional	Estoril Praia	Loan
24 July 2016	Ailton	Fluminense	Estoril Praia	Loan
25 July 2016	José Ángel Valdés	Porto	Villarreal	Loan
25 July 2016	Andrés Fernández	Porto	Villarreal	Loan
25 July 2016	Budag Nasirov	Sumgayit	Sporting CP	Undisclosed
26 July 2016	Abdoulaye Ba	Porto	Alanyaspor	Loan
26 July 2016	Leocísio Sami	Porto	Akhisar Belediyespor	Loan
27 July 2016	Marko Bakić	Fiorentina	Braga	Undisclosed
27 July 2016	Crislan	Braga	Tondela	Loan
28 July 2016	Danilo Barbosa	Braga	Benfica	Loan
28 July 2016	Miguel Lourenço	Vitória de Setúbal	Zira	Loan
29 July 2016	Hélder Costa	Benfica	Wolverhampton Wanderers	Loan
29 July 2016	Wallace	Braga	Lazio	Undisclosed
1 August 2016	Samuel Santos	(Brazil) Botafogo (SP)	(Portugal) Marítimo	Undisclosed fee
1 August 2016	Marcos Valente	(Portugal) Benfica B	(Portugal) Vitória Guimarães	Undisclosed fee
2 August 2016	Igor Lichnovsky	(Portugal) Porto	(Spain) Real Valladolid	Loan
2 August 2016	João Teixeira	(Portugal) Benfica	(England) Wolverhampton Wanderers	Loan
3 August 2016	Paolo Hurtado	(England) Reading	(Portugal) Vitória Guimarães	Loan
4 August 2016	Arghus	(Portugal) Braga	(Netherlands) Excelsior	Loan
4 August 2016	(Guinea-Bissau) Zé Turbo	(Italy) Inter	(Portugal) Tondela	Loan
6 August 2016	Beto	(Spain) Sevilla	(Portugal) Sporting CP	Free
8 August 2016	Laurent Depoitre	(Belgium) Gent	(Portugal) Porto	Undisclosed fee
10 August 2016	Thiago Carleto	(Brazil) São Paulo	(Portugal) Arouca	Undisclosed fee
11 August 2016	Suk Hyun-jun	(Portugal) Porto	(Turkey) Trabzonspor	Loan
12 August 2016	Hélder Postiga	(Portugal) Rio Ave	(India) Atlético de Kolkata	Undisclosed fee
14 August 2016	Prince-Désir Gouano	(Italy) Atalanta	(Portugal) Vitória Guimarães	Loan
15 August 2016	Pedro Delgado	(Italy) Inter	(Portugal) Benfica	Undisclosed fee
17 August 2016	Hervé Tchami	(Turkey) Giresunspor	(Portugal) Feirense	Undisclosed fee
18 August 2016	Jean Sony Alcénat	(Romania) Steaua București	(Portugal) Feirense	Undisclosed fee
18 August 2016	Bernard Mensah	(Spain) Atlético Madrid	(Portugal) Vitória Guimarães	Loan
18 August 2016	Erdem Şen	(Turkey) Gaziantepspor	(Portugal) Marítimo	Undisclosed fee
19 August 2016	Vincent Sasso	(Portugal) Braga	(England) Sheffield Wednesday	Undisclosed fee
21 August 2016	Joel Campbell	(England) Arsenal	(Portugal) Sporting CP	Loan
22 August 2016	Ola John	(Portugal) Benfica	(England) Wolverhampton Wanderers	Loan
23 August 2016	Josué	(Portugal) Porto	(Turkey) Galatasaray	Loan
24 August 2016	Talisca	(Portugal) Benfica	(Turkey) Beşiktaş	Loan
25 August 2016	Douglas	(Turkey) Trabzonspor	(Portugal) Sporting CP	Undisclosed fee
25 August 2016	Hernâni	(Portugal) Porto	(Portugal) Vitória Guimarães	Loan
25 August 2016	Diogo Jota	(Spain) Atlético Madrid	(Portugal) Porto	Loan
25 August 2016	Óliver	(Spain) Atlético Madrid	(Portugal) Porto	Loan
26 August 2016	Alberto Aquilani	(Portugal) Sporting CP	(Italy) Pescara	Free
27 August 2016	Vincent Aboubakar	(Portugal) Porto	(Turkey) Beşiktaş	Loan
27 August 2016	João Mário	(Portugal) Sporting CP	(Italy) Inter	€40m
27 August 2016	Bas Dost	(Germany) VfL Wolfsburg	(Portugal) Sporting CP	Undisclosed fee
30 August 2016	Aarón Ñíguez	(Portugal) Braga	(Spain) Tenerife	Free
30 August 2016	Nélson Oliveira	(Portugal) Benfica	(England) Norwich City	Undisclosed fee
31 August 2016	João Afonso	(Portugal) Vitória Guimarães	(Portugal) Estoril Praia	Loan
31 August 2016	Anderson	(Portugal) Estoril Praia	(Belgium) Gent	Undisclosed fee
31 August 2016	Alberto Bueno	(Portugal) Porto	(Spain) Granada	Loan
31 August 2016	Mehdi Carcela	(Portugal) Benfica	(Spain) Granada	Undisclosed fee
31 August 2016	Elias	(Brazil) Corinthians	(Portugal) Sporting CP	€2.5m
31 August 2016	Rui Fonte	(Portugal) Benfica	(Portugal) Braga	Undisclosed fee
31 August 2016	Licá	(Portugal) Porto	(England) Nottingham Forest	Undisclosed fee
31 August 2016	Frédéric Maciel	(Belgium) Royal Excel Mouscron	(Portugal) Moreirense	Undisclosed fee
31 August 2016	Wallyson Mallmann	(Portugal) Sporting CP	(Belgium) Standard Liège	Loan
31 August 2016	Carlos Mané	(Portugal) Sporting CP	(Germany) VfB Stuttgart	Loan
31 August 2016	Lazar Marković	(England) Liverpool	(Portugal) Sporting CP	Loan
31 August 2016	Bruno Martins Indi	(Portugal) Porto	(England) Stoke City	Loan
31 August 2016	Joel Castro Pereira	(England) Manchester United	(Portugal) Belenenses	Loan
31 August 2016	Carlos Ponck	(Portugal) Benfica B	(Portugal) Chaves	Loan
31 August 2016	Diego Reyes	(Portugal) Porto	(Spain) Espanyol	Loan
31 August 2016	Islam Slimani	(Portugal) Sporting CP	(England) Leicester City	€30m
31 August 2016	Ricardo Valente	(Portugal) Vitória Guimarães	(Portugal) Paços de Ferreira	Loan
1 September 2016	Oscar Benítez	(Portugal) Benfica	(Portugal) Braga	Loan
1 September 2016	Rafa Silva	(Portugal) Braga	(Portugal) Benfica	€16.4m
7 September 2016	Mika	(Portugal) Boavista	(England) Sunderland	Undisclosed fee

- ^1 A player who signed with a club before the opening of the summer transfer window, will officially join his new club on 1 July. While a player who joined a club after 1 July will join his new club following his signature of the contract.
