= Alfaiate =

Alfaiate is a surname that means "tailor" in Portuguese. Notable people with the surname include:

- Alexandre Alfaiate (born 1995), Portuguese footballer
- Rúben Alfaiate (born 1995), Portuguese footballer
