= 2012–13 Uruguayan Segunda División season =

Segunda División
- Season: 2012–13
- Champions: Sud América (7th title)
- Promoted: Sud América; Rentistas; Miramar Misiones
- Relegated: Huracán
- Matches: 182
- Goals: 461 (2.53 per match)
- Top goalscorer: Guillermo Maidana (16 goals)
- Biggest home win: Miramar Misiones 4–0 Rocha (1 December 2012); Boston River 4–0 Atenas (23 March 2013); Atenas 4–0 Huracán (18 May 2013)
- Biggest away win: Atenas 0–4 Sud América (1 December 2012); Rocha 0–4 Tacuarembó (25 May 2013)
- Highest scoring: Torque 6–3 Rocha (4 May 2013)
- Longest winning run: 5 games: Sud América; Rentistas
- Longest unbeaten run: 9 games: Sud América; Tacuarembó
- Longest winless run: 14 games: Villa Teresa
- Longest losing run: 8 games: Rocha

The 2012–13 Uruguayan Segunda División is the season of the professional second division of football in Uruguay. A total of 14 teams will compete; the top two teams and the winner of the Championship play-offs are promoted to the Uruguayan Primera División. The club in last position is relegated.

== Club information ==
Locations of the 2012–13 season teams outside Montevideo.
Locations of the 2012−13 season teams within Montevideo.

Club	City	Stadium
Atenas	San Carlos	Atenas
Boston River	Montevideo	Charrúa
Cerrito	Montevideo	Parque Maracaná
Deportivo Maldonado	Maldonado	Domingo Burgueño Miguel
Huracán	Montevideo	Parque Pedro Ángel Bossio
Miramar Misiones	Montevideo	Parque Luis Méndez Piana
Plaza Colonia	Colonia	Professor Alberto Suppici
Rampla Juniors	Montevideo	Olímpico
Rentistas	Montevideo	Complejo Rentistas
Rocha	Rocha	Municipal Doctor Mario Sobrero
Sud América	Montevideo	Carlos Ángel Fossa
Tacuarembó	Tacuarembó	Ingeniero Raúl Goyenola
Torque	Montevideo	Daniel Marsicano
Villa Teresa	Montevideo	Parque Salus

== Standings ==
Pos	Team	Pld	W	D	L	GF	GA	GD	Pts	Promotion or relegation
1	Sud América (P)	26	14	6	6	39	18	+21	48	Promotion to 2013–14 Primera División
2	Miramar Misiones	26	14	4	8	39	28	+11	46	2nd place play-off
3	Rentistas (P)	26	14	4	8	34	24	+10	46	2nd place play-off
4	Tacuarembó	26	12	9	5	38	24	+14	45	Qualification to 2013 Promotion Playoff
5	Torque	26	13	5	8	43	33	+10	44	Qualification to 2013 Promotion Playoff
6	Cerrito	26	10	7	9	26	30	−4	37	Qualification to 2013 Promotion Playoff
7	Boston River	26	8	12	6	37	31	+6	36	Qualification to 2013 Promotion Playoff
8	Atenas	26	9	7	10	28	32	−4	34	Qualification to 2013 Promotion Playoff
9	Rampla Juniors	26	7	11	8	26	26	0	32	Qualification to 2013 Promotion Playoff
10	Plaza Colonia	26	7	7	12	23	34	−11	28	Qualification to 2013 Promotion Playoff
11	Deportivo Maldonado	26	6	8	12	25	33	−8	26	
12	Rocha	26	6	7	13	32	51	−19	25	
13	Villa Teresa	26	3	13	10	29	41	−12	22	
14	Huracán	26	4	10	12	28	42	−14	22	Relegation to 2013–14 Segunda División Amateur

Updated to match(es) played on 15 June 2013. Source: Soccerway
Rules for classification: 1st points; 2nd goal difference; 3rd goals scored; 4th head-to-head points; 5th head-to-head goal difference; 6th head-to-head goals scored. This does not apply to determining the champion. If two or more teams had been tied in point at the end of the tournament, a playoff would have been held at a neutral venue within 72 hours for the championship
(P) Promoted

=== Second Place Playoffs ===
25 June 2013

Rentistas	0–0	Miramar Misiones

29 June 2013

Miramar Misiones	0–3	Rentistas

=== Relegation Playoffs ===
25 June 2013

Huracán	0–3	Villa Teresa

29 June 2013

Villa Teresa	2–1	Huracán

== Promotion playoff ==
Quarterfinals
3	Miramar Misiones	1	3	4
10	Plaza Colonia	3	0	3
6	Cerrito	2	1	3
7	Boston River	3	2	5
5	Torque	1	2	3
8	Atenas	2	0	2
4	Tacuarembó	1	3	4
9	Rampla Juniors	3	0	3

Semifinals
3	Miramar Misiones	0	2	2
7	Boston River	0	1	1
5	Torque	3	0	3
4	Tacuarembó	1	1	2

Final
3	Miramar Misiones	0	1	1 (5)
5	Torque	0	1	1 (3)

== See also ==
- 2012–13 in Uruguayan football
