= Jorge Prado =

Jorge Prado may refer to:

- Jorge del Prado Chávez (1910–1999), Peruvian politician
- Jorge Prado Aránguiz (1938–2018), Chilean politician
- Jorge Prado (footballer, born 1982), Spanish footballer
- Jorge Prado (footballer, born 1995), Colombian footballer
- Jorge Prado (motocross racer) (born 2001), Spanish motocross racer
