= Felipe Augusto =

Felipe Augusto may refer to:

- Felipe Augusto (footballer, born 1992), Brazilian football player, full name Felipe Augusto Ferreira Batista
- Felipe Augusto (footballer, born 1993), Brazilian football player, full name Felipe Augusto de Abreu
- Felipe Augusto (footballer, born 2004), Brazilian football player, full name Felipe Augusto da Silva
