= Alexis Zárate =

Argentine footballer (born 1994)

Personal information
- Full name: Alexis Joel Zárate Maldonado
- Date of birth: 8 May 1994 (age 32)
- Place of birth: General Deheza, Argentina
- Height: 1.79 m (5 ft 10 1/2 in)
- Position: Right back

Senior career*
Years	Team	Apps	(Gls)
2013–2017	Independiente	15	(1)
2016–2017	→ Temperley (loan)	28	(2)
2018	FK Liepāja	3	(0)

International career
2011	Argentina U17	9	(0)
- * Club domestic league appearances and goals as of 01:45, 2 January 2019 (UTC)

Alexis Joel Zárate Maldonado (born 8 May 1994) is an Argentine former footballer who played as a right back.

== Club career ==
Zárate's career started with Independiente in 2013, making his professional bow during a win over Boca Unidos in the Copa Argentina on 22 May; his first league appearance arrived a month later against Colón. Zárate scored the first goal of his career versus Godoy Cruz in October 2014. On 1 January 2016, fellow Argentine Primera División team Temperley loaned Zárate until December 2017. He scored goals against Huracán and Colón throughout thirty-one appearances for Temperley. In January 2018, Latvian Higher League side FK Liepāja completed the signing of Zárate. He made his debut in a March win over Riga FC.

== International career ==
2011 saw Zárate win a total of nine caps for the Argentina U17s at the 2011 South American Under-17 Football Championship and 2011 FIFA U-17 World Cup.

== Personal life ==
In September 2017, Zárate was found guilty of rape. However, he remained at liberty during the appeals process and was allowed to join Latvia's FK Liepāja in March 2018. Zárate's appeal was dismissed by the Supreme Court of Argentina on 3 December 2018, with final sentencing awaiting determination. A year later, on 5 December 2019, a court in Buenos Aires ruled against Zárate's second appeal. Despite this, a request for Zárate's arrest was denied by a Lomas de Zamora court; with the Supreme Court case still pending. On 3 July 2020, Zárate was taken into custody after his appeal was dismissed and jailed to serve his six-and-a-half-year sentence. He submitted an additional complaint appeal to the Supreme Court, which was denied on 16 June 2022 and the ex-football player will have to spend his six-and-a-half years sentence imprisoned.

== Career statistics ==
As of 2 January 2019.

Club statistics
Club	Season	League			Cup (Note: Includes the Copa Argentina)		League Cup		Continental (Note: Includes the Copa Sudamericana and UEFA Europa League)		Other		Total	
Club	Season	Division	Apps	Goals	Apps	Goals	Apps	Goals	Apps	Goals	Apps	Goals	Apps	Goals
Independiente	2012–13	Primera División	1	0	1	0	—		0	0	0	0	2	0
Independiente	2013–14	Primera B Nacional	1	0	0	0	—		—		0	0	1	0
Independiente	2014	Primera División	12	1	1	0	—		—		0	0	13	1
Independiente	2015	Primera División	1	0	0	0	—		1 (Note: One appearance in 2015 Copa Sudamericana)	0	0	0	2	0
Independiente	2016	Primera División	0	0	0	0	—		—		0	0	0	0
Independiente	2016–17	Primera División	0	0	0	0	—		0	0	0	0	0	0
Independiente	2017–18	Primera División	0	0	0	0	—		0	0	0	0	0	0
Independiente	Total		15	1	2	0	—		1	0	0	0	18	1
Temperley (loan)	2016	Primera División	3	0	1	0	—		—		0	0	4	0
Temperley (loan)	2016–17	Primera División	25	2	1	0	—		—		0	0	26	2
Temperley (loan)	2017–18	Primera División	0	0	1	0	—		—		0	0	1	0
Temperley (loan)	Total		28	2	3	0	—		—		0	0	31	2
FK Liepāja	2018	Higher League	3	0	0	0	—		0	0	0	0	3	0
Career total			46	3	5	0	—		1	0	0	0	52	3
