= Kaká (footballer, born May 1991) =

Brazilian footballer

Personal information
- Full name: Everton Ferreira Guimarães
- Date of birth: May 20, 1991 (age 35)
- Place of birth: São Paulo, Brazil
- Height: 1.76 m (5 ft 9 1/2 in)
- Position: Attacking midfielder

Youth career
- 2004–2007: São Paulo
- 2008–2009: Madureira

Senior career*
Years	Team	Apps	(Gls)
2009	Madureira		
2010	Botafogo	20	(11)
2011	Cabofriense	16	(12)
2011–2015	Torreense	58	(4)
2015–2017	Mafra	28	(4)
2016–2017	→ Académica (loan)	32	(4)
2017–2020	Nacional	24	(1)
2020–2021	Mafra	20	(0)
2021–2022	Arar	21	(4)
2022–2023	Gokulam Kerala	6	(0)
2024–	Cinfães	0	(0)
- * Club domestic league appearances and goals as of 20:43, 19 February 2023 (UTC)

Everton Ferreira Guimarães (born 20 May 1991), commonly known as Kaká, is a Brazilian footballer who played for Liga Portugal club Cinfães.

== Club career ==
Everton Kaká spent the beginning of his career in Brazil, trained at São Paulo FC and was revealed by Botafogo do Rio de Janeiro, after professionalizing he transferred to Portugal and signed with SCU Torreense in 2011. In 2015, Kaká signed for CD. Mafra, was National champion and climbed up the division, was loaned to Académica de Coimbra and after excellent performances he was sold to Nacional da Madeira and signed a 3-year contract and was twice national champion of the Portuguese second league, returned in 2021 to do a season at CD. Mafra and moved to Saudi Arabia.

== Career statistics ==
=== Club ===
As of 19 February 2023

Club	Season	League			National Cup		League Cup		Continental		Total	
Club	Season	Division	Apps	Goals	Apps	Goals	Apps	Goals	Apps	Goals	Apps	Goals
Torreense	2011–12	Segunda Divisão	16	0	2 (Note: Appearance(s) in Taça de Portugal)	1	0	0	—		18	1
Torreense	2012–13	Segunda Divisão	13	2	0	0	0	0	—		13	2
Torreense	2013–14	Campeonato Nacional de Seniores	29	2	0	0	0	0	—		29	2
Torreense	Torreense total		58	4	2	1	0	0	0	0	60	5
Mafra	2014–15	Campeonato Nacional de Seniores	3	0	0	0	0	0	—		3	0
Mafra	2015–16	Liga Portugal 2	25	4	0	0	1 (Note: Appearance(s) in Taça da Liga)	0	—		26	4
Mafra	Mafra total		28	4	0	0	1	0	0	0	29	4
Académica (loan)	2016–17	Liga Portugal 2	32	4	4	0	1	0	—		37	4
Nacional	2017–18	Liga Portugal 2	19	1	1	0	0	0	—		20	1
Nacional	2018–19	Liga Portugal 1	4	0	0	0	2	0	—		6	0
Nacional	2019–20	Liga Portugal 2	1	0	0	0	1	0	—		2	0
Nacional	Nacional total		24	1	1	0	3	0	0	0	28	1
Mafra	2020–21	Liga Portugal 2	20	0	1	0	1	0	—		22	0
Mafra	2021–22	Liga Portugal 2	0	0	0	0	1	0	—		1	0
Mafra	Mafra total		20	0	1	0	2	0	0	0	23	0
Arar	2021–22	Saudi Second Division	21	4	0	0	0	0	—		21	4
Gokulam Kerala	2022–23	I-League	6	0	0	0	0	0	—		6	0
Career total			189	17	8	1	7	0	0	0	204	18
