= Diogo Coelho (footballer, born 1993) =

Portuguese footballer

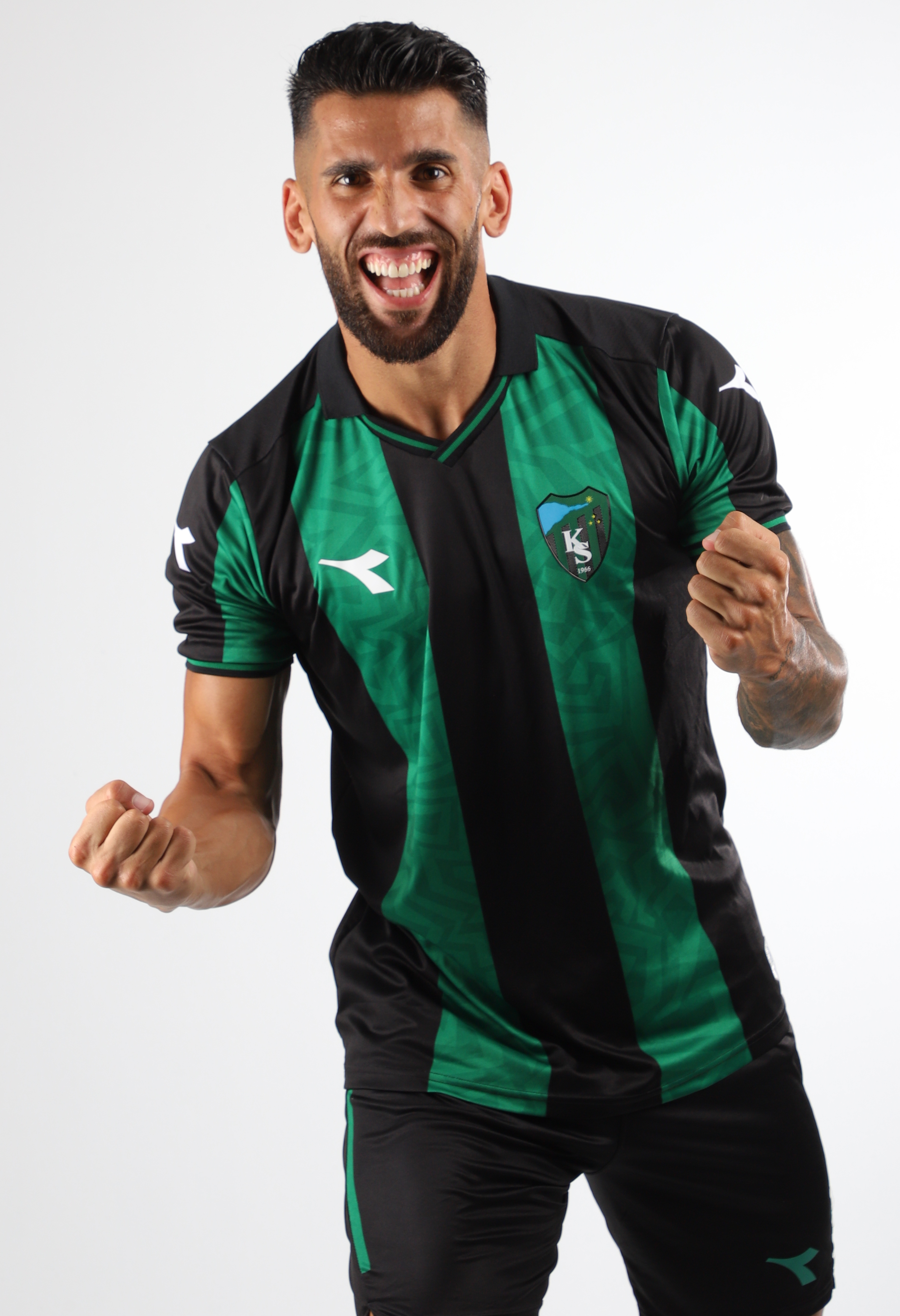

Personal information
- Full name: Diogo Alexis Rodrigues Coelho Özçakmak
- Date of birth: 14 September 1993 (age 33)
- Place of birth: Ponta do Sol, Portugal
- Height: 1.83 m (6 ft 0 in)
- Position: Centre-back

Team information
- Current team: Ankaragücü
- Number: 5

Youth career
- 2003–2009: Pontassolense
- 2009–2012: Nacional

Senior career*
| Years | Team | Apps | (Gls) |
| 2012–2020 | Nacional | 52 | (3) |
| 2014–2015 | → Covilhã (loan) | 39 | (3) |
| 2015–2016 | → Chaves (loan) | 23 | (0) |
| 2016–2017 | → Académica (loan) | 32 | (1) |
| 2020–2021 | Vilafranquense | 32 | (2) |
| 2021–2023 | Kocaelispor | 46 | (1) |
| 2023–2024 | Şanlıurfaspor | 17 | (0) |
| 2024– | Ankaragücü | 16 | (0) |
- * Club domestic league appearances and goals as of 15 June 2025

Diogo Alexis Rodrigues Coelho Özçakmak (born 14 September 1993) is a Portuguese professional footballer who plays for Turkish club Ankaragücü as a central defender.

== Club career ==
Born in Ponta do Sol, Madeira of Turkish descent through his father, Coelho joined C.D. Nacional's youth system at the age of 16. He made his Primeira Liga debut with the club on 11 May 2014 – the last matchday of the season – in a 1–0 away loss against Gil Vicente F.C. where he played the full 90 minutes.

Coelho then spent three years on loan in the LigaPro, with S.C. Covilhã, G.D. Chaves and Académica de Coimbra. Returned to the Estádio da Madeira for the 2017–18 campaign, he scored twice in 36 matches to help the team return to the top division as champions.

Coelho scored his only goal in the Portuguese top flight on 5 May 2019, helping to a 2–2 draw at Vitória S.C. after his side had trailed 2–0 with ten minutes left. After only two competitive appearances in 2019–20, however, he was released as his contract was about to expire.

On 23 June 2020, Coelho signed with U.D. Vilafranquense of division two. He moved abroad for the first time in his career one year later, joining Kocaelispor who had been recently promoted to the Turkish TFF First League.
