= Mauricio Felipe =

Uruguayan footballer (born 1990)

Personal information
- Full name: Mauricio Damián Felipe Herrera
- Date of birth: 8 October 1990 (age 36)
- Place of birth: Juan Lacaze, Uruguay
- Height: 1.71 m (5 ft 7 in)
- Position: Left back

Team information
- Current team: Uruguay Montevideo

Youth career
- –2010: Liverpool Montevideo

Senior career*
Years	Team	Apps	(Gls)
2010–2015	Liverpool Montevideo	63	(0)
2015–2019	Rampla Juniors	96	(4)
2020	Colón	9	(0)
2021–	Uruguay Montevideo	3	(0)
- * Club domestic league appearances and goals as of 18:54, 13 July 2021 (UTC)

Mauricio Damián Felipe Herrera (born 8 October 1990) is a Uruguayan footballer who plays as a defender for Uruguay Montevideo in the Uruguayan Segunda División.
