= Federico Ruiz =

Argentine footballer

Personal information
- Full name: Federico Pablo Ezequiel Ruiz
- Date of birth: 18 May 1989 (age 37)
- Place of birth: Berisso, Argentina
- Height: 1.76 m (5 ft 9 1/2 in)
- Position: Midfielder

Team information
- Current team: Sintrense

Senior career*
Years	Team	Apps	(Gls)
2008–2009	Linares		
2009	Ontinyent		
2010	Guadalajara		
2010–2011	Lucena		
2011–2013	Gimnasia		
2013–2014	Platense		
2014–2015	Deportivo Merlo	11	(2)
2016	Colón	1	(0)
2016–	Sporting	0	(0)
2016–	→ Sintrense (loan)	3	(0)
- * Club domestic league appearances and goals as of 30 October 2016

Federico Pablo Ezequiel Ruiz (born 18 May 1989) is an Argentine football player who plays for Sintrense on loan from Sporting.

== Club career ==
He made his professional debut in the Primera B Metropolitana for Deportivo Merlo on 2 September 2014 in a game against Tristán Suárez.

He signed with Sporting on 2 June 2016 on the same day as his brother Alan. He was sent on loan to the third-tier team Sintrense until the end of the 2016–17 season on 24 August 2016.

== Personal ==
He is the older brother of Alan Ruiz.
