= Tom Tavares =

Cape Verdean footballer (born 1987)

Personal information
- Full name: António Sérgio Lopes Tavares
- Date of birth: 12 June 1987 (age 39)
- Place of birth: Tarrafal, Cape Verde
- Height: 1.81 m (5 ft 11 1/2 in)
- Position: Midfielder

Team information
- Current team: Vitória de Sernache
- Number: 20

Senior career*
Years	Team	Apps	(Gls)
2008–2009	Estrela dos Amadores		
2009–2010	Sporting Praia		
2010–2011	Anadia	8	(0)
2011	Primeiro de Agosto		
2012	Benfica de Luanda		
2013–2016	Oriental de Lisboa	115	(21)
2016–2017	Académica	18	(1)
2017–2019	Casa Pia	50	(2)
2019–2020	Torreense	14	(1)
2020	Coimbrões	6	(0)
2020–2021	Atlético CP	11	(1)
2021–2022	Montijo	36	(2)
2022–	Vitória de Sernache	40	(4)

International career^{‡}
2009–	Cape Verde	3	(0)
- * Club domestic league appearances and goals as of 20:23, 14 November 2023 (UTC) ‡ National team caps and goals as of 18:05, 30 June 2016 (UTC)

António Sérgio Lopes Tavares (born 12 June 1987) is a Cape Verdean international footballer who plays for Portuguese club Vitória de Sernache, as a midfielder.

== Career ==
Born in Tarrafal, Tavares has played for Estrela dos Amadores, Sporting Clube da Praia, Anadia, Primeiro de Agosto, Benfica de Luanda and Oriental de Lisboa. In June 2016 he signed for Académica.

He made his international debut for Cape Verde in 2009.
