= Ernest Ohemeng =

Ghanaian footballer (born 1996)

Personal information
- Date of birth: 1 January 1996 (age 30)
- Place of birth: Accra, Ghana
- Height: 1.75 m (5 ft 9 in)
- Position: Winger

Team information
- Current team: Marbella
- Number: 19

Youth career
- 2013–2015: Rio Ave

Senior career*
Years	Team	Apps	(Gls)
2014–2015	Rio Ave	1	(0)
2015–2018	Moreirense	23	(0)
2016–2017	→ Académica (loan)	34	(2)
2018	→ Arouca (loan)	10	(1)
2018–2020	Mirandés	20	(1)
2020–2021	Salamanca UDS	21	(0)
2021–2022	Tarazona	33	(3)
2022–2023	Villanovense	34	(3)
2023–	Marbella	107	(5)
- * Club domestic league appearances and goals as of 10 June 2026

Ernest Ohemeng (born 17 January 1996) is a Ghanaian footballer who plays as a winger for Spanish club Marbella.

== Career ==
Ohemeng was a Rio Ave youth graduate. He made his senior debut on 12 April 2014, in a 2–1 Primeira Liga loss against Olhanense; it was his maiden appearance for the club.

On 7 July 2015, Ohemeng and his teammate Emmanuel Boateng made a permanent move to fellow Primeira Liga side Moreirense. After featuring sparingly, he was loaned to Académica de Coimbra and Arouca.

On 3 August 2018, Ohemeng signed a two-year deal with CD Mirandés in the Spanish Segunda División B. He helped the side achieve promotion to Segunda División, but appeared rarely during his two-year spell at the club.

On 29 July 2020, Ohemeng joined Salamanca CF UDS in the third division.
