= Jimmy Ines =

Cape Verdean footballer (born 1994)

Personal information
- Full name: Jimmy Claidir Duarte Ines
- Date of birth: 15 July 1994 (age 32)
- Place of birth: Praia, Cape Verde
- Height: 1.82 m (6 ft 0 in)
- Position: Midfielder

Team information
- Current team: Jeunesse Canach

Youth career
- 2012−2013: Académica

Senior career*
Years	Team	Apps	(Gls)
2013−2017	Académica	18	(0)
2013−2014	→ União Madeira (loan)	13	(0)
2015−2016	→ Santa Clara (loan)	47	(1)
2023−	Jeunesse Canach	58	(5)
- * Club domestic league appearances and goals as of 25 May 2026

Jimmy Ines (born 15 July 1994) is a Cape Verdean footballer who plays a midfielder for Luxembourgish club Jeunesse Canach.

== Club career ==
In June 2013 Ines signed his first professional contract, agreeing to a four-year deal. He spent the next season loaned to União da Madeira.

He made his Primeira Liga debut on 28 September 2014, appearing as a late substitute in a 1–0 away win against Arouca.

On 2 February 2015, Ines moved to Santa Clara on a six-month loan. Six days later, He made his debut in a 1–1 home draw with S.C. Farense. On 19 April, he scored his first ever professional goal in a 2–0 home win against Académico Viseu.
