= Diego Barisone =

Argentine footballer (1989–2015)

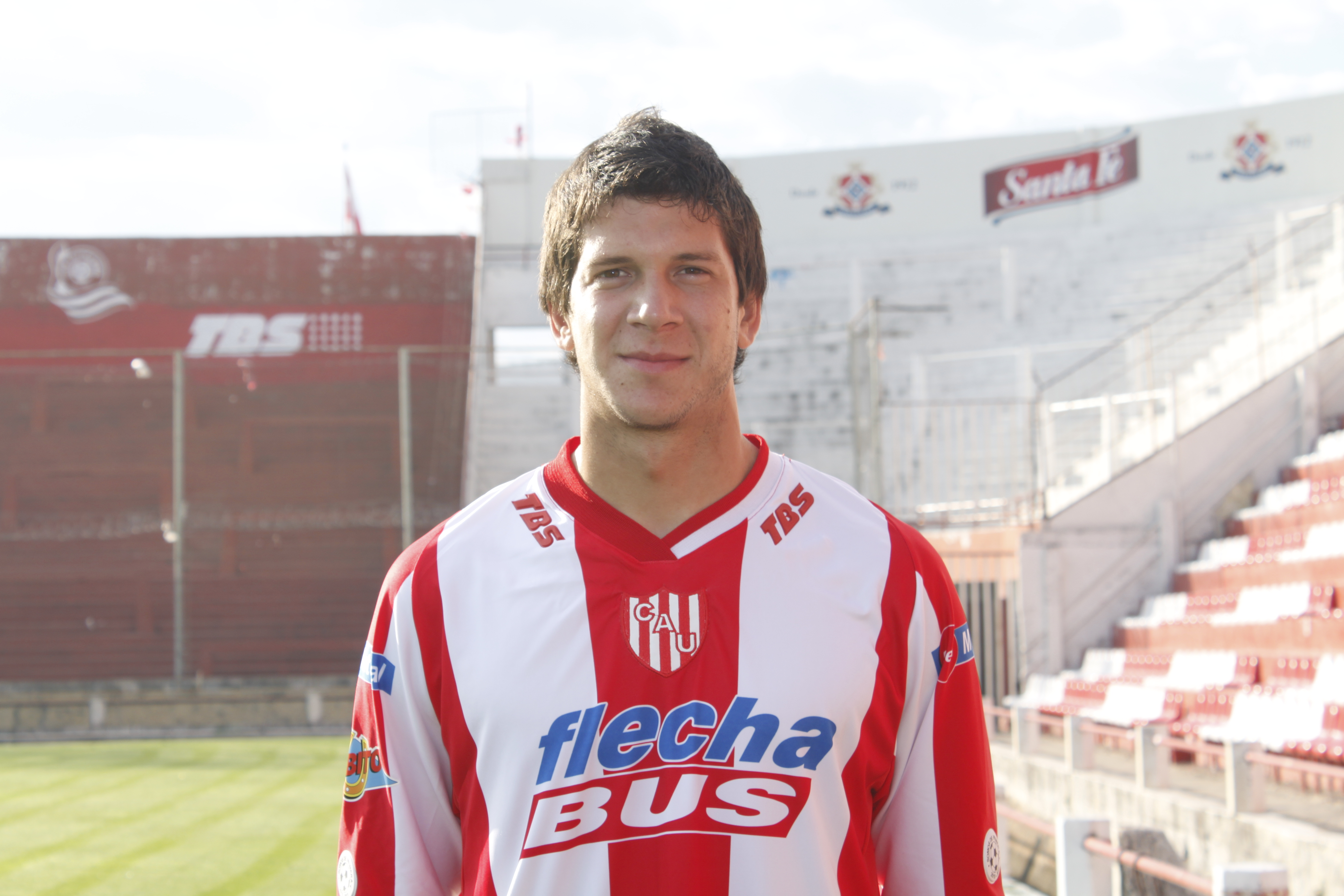
- Diego Barisone in 2011.

Personal information
- Full name: Diego Francisco Barisone
- Date of birth: 29 May 1989
- Place of birth: Santa Fe, Argentina
- Date of death: 28 July 2015 (aged 26)
- Place of death: Coronda, Argentina
- Height: 1.84 m (6 ft 1/2 in)
- Position: Defender

Senior career*
Years	Team	Apps	(Gls)
2009–2015	Unión de Santa Fe	49	(3)
2013–2014	→Argentinos Juniors (loan)	27	(0)
2015	Lanús	17	(0)
- * Club domestic league appearances and goals

Diego Francisco Barisone (29 May 1989 – 28 July 2015) was an Argentine footballer who played for Unión de Santa Fe, Argentinos Juniors and Lanús.

== Playing career ==
Barisone began his senior career for Unión de Santa Fe in 2009. He was contracted to Unión until 2015, with a loan stint at Argentinos Juniors from June 2013 until June 2014.

In January 2015 Barisone transferred to Lanús where he played 17 times until shortly before his death in July 2015.

== Death ==
Barisone died in a car crash on 28 July 2015.
