= Gonzalo Castillo (footballer) =

Uruguayan footballer (born 1990)

Personal information
- Full name: Gonzalo Gabriel Castillo Cabral
- Date of birth: 17 October 1990 (age 36)
- Place of birth: Melo, Uruguay
- Height: 1.79 m (5 ft 10 in)
- Position: Centre-back

Team information
- Current team: Wilstermann
- Number: 5

Senior career*
Years	Team	Apps	(Gls)
2010–2013	Cerro Largo	41	(0)
2013–2016	Atenas	43	(2)
2016	Deportivo Maldonado	13	(1)
2016–2018	Torque	24	(2)
2018–2019	Progreso	67	(2)
2020–2023	The Strongest	96	(3)
2024–	Wilstermann	40	(1)
2024	→ Progreso (loan)	13	(0)
- * Club domestic league appearances and goals as of 30 December 2025

Gonzalo Gabriel Castillo Cabral (born 17 October 1990) is a Uruguayan footballer who plays as a centre-back for Bolivian club Wilstermann.

== Honours ==
The Strongest

- Primera División: 2023
