= João Simões (footballer, born 1998) =

Portuguese footballer

Personal information
- Full name: João Nelson de Sousa Caridade Simões
- Date of birth: 4 March 1998 (age 28)
- Place of birth: Coimbra, Portugal
- Height: 1.76 m (5 ft 9 in)
- Position: Right-back

Team information
- Current team: Sourense
- Number: 22

Youth career
- 2007–2010: Académica
- 2010–2016: Sporting
- 2016–2017: Académica

Senior career*
Years	Team	Apps	(Gls)
2017–2021	Académica	18	(0)
2019	→ Berço (loan)	13	(0)
2020	→ Anadia (loan)	2	(0)
2021–2022	Condeixa	20	(0)
2022–2023	Pampilhosa	16	(0)
2023–	Sourense	10	(0)
- * Club domestic league appearances and goals as of 21:12, 25 December 2023 (UTC)

João Nelson de Sousa Caridade Simões (born 4 March 1998) is a Portuguese professional footballer who plays for Sourense as a right-back.

== Career ==
On 25 February 2017, Simões made his professional debut with Académica in a 2016–17 LigaPro match against Cova da Piedade. In August 2019, Simões was loaned out to Berço SC for the 2019–20 season. However, in January 2020, it was reported that he had returned to Académica. On 20 March 2020, he was loaned out to Anadia.

Simões returned to Académica for the 2020–21 season, where he only made two appearances during the season. In the summer 2021, Simões joined Condeixa. Ahead of the 2022–23 season, he joined Pampilhosa.
