= João Paulo (footballer, born 8 May 1989) =

Portuguese footballer

Personal information
- Full name: João Paulo Pereira Gomes
- Date of birth: 8 May 1989 (age 37)
- Place of birth: Braga, Portugal
- Height: 1.89 m (6 ft 2 in)
- Position: Centre-back

Team information
- Current team: Dumiense/CJPII
- Number: 34

Youth career
- 2005–2006: Braga
- 2006–2008: Merelinense

Senior career*
Years	Team	Apps	(Gls)
2008–2011	Merelinense	33	(1)
2011–2012	Vilaverdense	32	(1)
2012–2014	Aves	50	(3)
2014–2015	CFR Cluj	0	(0)
2014–2015	→ Portimonense (loan)	23	(0)
2015–2020	Penafiel	136	(11)
2020–2022	Trofense	42	(6)
2022–2023	Torreense	12	(1)
2023–	Dumiense/CJP II	9	(0)
- * Club domestic league appearances and goals as of 19:57, 16 November 2023 (UTC)

João Paulo Pereira Gomes (born 8 May 1989), known as João Paulo, is a Portuguese footballer who plays for Dumiense/CJP II as a centre-back.

== Career ==
On 29 June 2022, João Paulo signed with Liga Portugal 2 club Torreense.
