= Pablo Lanz =

Argentine footballer

Personal information
- Full name: Pablo Javier Lanz
- Date of birth: March 19, 1979 (age 47)
- Place of birth: Buenos Aires, Argentina
- Height: 1.80 m (5 ft 11 in)
- Position: Goalkeeper

Youth career
- 1994–1998: Platense

Senior career*
Years	Team	Apps	(Gls)
1999–2001	Platense	0	(0)
2002–2004	Real Santa Cruz	23	(0)
2005	Destroyers	31	(0)
2006	Bolívar	7	(0)
2007	Real Mamoré	18	(0)
2008	Blooming	10	(0)
2009	Alianza Atlético	19	(0)
2009	Sportivo Italiano	6	(0)
2010	Real Mamoré	67	(0)
2011–2013	Aurora	42	(0)
- * Club domestic league appearances and goals

Pablo Javier Lanz (born March 19, 1979) is an Argentine former professional footballer who played as a goalkeeper.

== Career ==
Lanz was born in Buenos Aires. He began his career at the youth sector of Argentine club Platense. Although he worked his way up to the first team, he made his professional debut in the Liga de Fútbol Profesional Boliviano playing for Real Santa Cruz in 2002. After three years with Real, his spell in Bolivia extended as he also played for Destroyers, Bolívar, Real Mamoré and Blooming.

In January 2009, he relocated to Peru where he signed for Alianza Atlético from the Primera División Peruana. In 2010, he returned to Bolivia and joined Real Mamoré for his second spell.
