= Kalindi (footballer) =

Brazilian footballer (1993–2022)

Personal information
- Full name: Kalindi Alves de Souza
- Date of birth: 29 August 1993
- Place of birth: Pará, Brazil
- Date of death: 10 April 2022 (aged 28)
- Place of death: Brazil
- Height: 1.70 m (5 ft 7 in)
- Position: Right-back

Youth career
- 2012: Tuna Luso

Senior career*
Years	Team	Apps	(Gls)
2013–2014	Tuna Luso		
2013	→ São José-AP (loan)		
2013	→ Pinhereinse (loan)		
2015–2018	Grêmio Anápolis	12	(1)
2015–2018	→ Penafiel (loan)	92	(1)
2018–2022	Nacional	65	(1)
2022	Académica	0	(0)
- * Club domestic league appearances and goals

Kalindi Alves de Souza (29 August 1993 – 10 April 2022), known as Kalindi, was a Brazilian professional footballer who played as a right-back.

== Club career ==
Kalindi made his professional debut in the Segunda Liga for Penafiel on 2 December 2015 in a game against Mafra.

On 10 April 2022, he died in Brazil due to a cardiac arrest after battling an autoimmune disease.
