= Diogo Lamelas =

Portuguese footballer

Personal information
- Full name: Diogo André Fernandes Lamelas
- Date of birth: 4 March 1990 (age 36)
- Place of birth: São Torcato, Portugal
- Height: 1.71 m (5 ft 7 1/2 in)
- Position: Winger

Youth career
- 2000–2003: Vitória Guimarães
- 2003–2004: Candoso São Tiago
- 2004–2009: Vitória Guimarães

Senior career*
Years	Team	Apps	(Gls)
2009–2014	Vitória Guimarães	0	(0)
2010	→ Lousada (loan)	9	(0)
2010–2012	→ Amarante (loan)	44	(11)
2012–2013	Vitória Guimarães B	34	(1)
2014	Cinfães	16	(3)
2014–2018	Vizela	94	(4)
2018–2020	Amarante	47	(6)
2020–2024	Sandinenses	72	(3)
Total		316	(28)
- * Club domestic league appearances and goals

Diogo André Fernandes Lamelas (born 4 March 1990) is a Portuguese former professional footballer who played mainly as a right winger.

== Club career ==
Lamelas was born in the village of São Torcato in Guimarães. A product of hometown Vitória SC's youth system, he never appeared however in any competitive games for the Estádio D. Afonso Henriques-based club. He finished the 2009–10 season on loan at third division side A.D. Lousada, returning in June 2010 and being immediately loaned again, now to Amarante F.C. in the fourth tier.

In the summer of 2012, after having competed with Amarante in division three, Lamelas returned to Vitória and was assigned to its newly created B team one league above. His professional debut took place on 12 August 2012, when he started and was replaced toward the end of a 0–0 home draw against S.C. Covilhã. His first goal came on 22 October that year, a consolation in a 2–1 away loss to S.L. Benfica B.

After being released in January 2014, and with the exception of the 2016–17 campaign with F.C. Vizela in the second tier (27 matches and three goals, relegation), Lamelas played exclusively in the lower leagues.
