= Arnaldo Giménez =

Bolivian footballer (born 1987)

Personal information
- Full name: Arnaldo Andrés Giménez Dos Santos
- Date of birth: 9 March 1987 (age 39)
- Place of birth: Luque, Paraguay
- Height: 1.95 m (6 ft 5 in)
- Position: Goalkeeper

Senior career*
Years	Team	Apps	(Gls)
2008	Silvio Pettirossi	0	(0)
2008–2009	3 de Febrero	0	(0)
2009–2011	Olimpia	1	(0)
2011	→ Sportivo Trinidense (loan)	0	(0)
2012–2014	Unión La Calera	31	(2)
2015	Sportivo Luqueño	28	(0)
2016	Boyacá Chicó	14	(0)
2016–2017	Club Nacional	22	(0)
2017–2018	Boca Unidos	4	(0)
2018–2021	Wilstermann	126	(0)
2022	Always Ready	16	(0)
2022–2025	Wilstermann	69	(0)
- * Club domestic league appearances and goals as of 8 June 2021 ‡ National team caps and goals as of 8 June 2021

Arnaldo Andrés Giménez Dos Santos (born 9 March 1987, in Luque, Paraguay) is a Paraguayan naturalized Bolivian footballer who plays as a goalkeeper for Bolivian club Wilstermann.

== Honours ==
Olimpia

- Torneo Clausura Paraguayan Primera División Championship: 2011

Wilstermann

- Torneo Apertura Bolivian Primera División: 2018
- Torneo Clausura Bolivian Primera División: 2019
