= Luciano Leguizamón =

Argentine footballer

Personal information
- Full name: Félix Luciano Leguizamón
- Date of birth: July 1, 1982 (age 44)
- Place of birth: Concepción del Uruguay, Argentina
- Height: 1.70 m (5 ft 7 in)
- Position: Second striker

Senior career*
Years	Team	Apps	(Gls)
1998–2002	Gimnasia CdU	79	(27)
2002–2005	River Plate	4	(0)
2003	→ Unión Santa Fe (loan)	13	(3)
2003–2004	→ Poli Ejido (loan)	13	(0)
2005–2006	Talleres	32	(11)
2006–2007	Gimnasia LP	43	(7)
2008–2012	Arsenal de Sarandí	105	(35)
2009	→ Al-Ittihad (loan)	14	(3)
2012–2013	Independiente	16	(1)
2013	Colón	9	(0)
2014	Everton	7	(0)
2014	UTC	3	(1)
2015	Guaraní Antonio Franco	29	(5)
2016–2023	Gimnasia CdU	124	(33)
- * Club domestic league appearances and goals

Félix Luciano Leguizamón (born 1 July 1982), known as Luciano Leguizamón, is an Argentine former footballer who played as a second striker.

== Career ==
Leguizamón started his career in Gimnasia y Esgrima de Concepción del Uruguay. He then moved on to River Plate. Not having played much at River, he was loaned to Unión de Santa Fe and Polideportivo Ejido (Spain). Subsequently, he joined Talleres de Córdoba where he fought unsuccessfully to get the team's promotion to Argentine Primera División. He then played for Gimnasia y Esgrima de La Plata between 2006 and 2007.

His exit from Gimnasia was not amicable. The fans turned against him after he traded shirts with Juan Sebastian Verón at halftime of the derby with Estudiantes de la Plata in 2007.

He subsequently moved to Arsenal de Sarandí. In August 2009, he was loaned to Al-Ittihad in Saudi Arabia and, returned to Arsenal in January 2010.

In 2014, Leguizamón moved to Chile and joined Everton de Viña del Mar from Colón.

From 2016 to 2023, Leguizamón played for his hometown club, Gimnasia de Concepción del Uruguay, and announced his retirement in June 2023.

== Honours ==
Arsenal

- Argentine Primera División (1): 2012 Clausura
