= Tozé Marreco =

Portuguese footballer

Personal information
- Full name: António José Marreco de Gouveia
- Date of birth: 25 July 1987 (age 39)
- Place of birth: Miranda do Corvo, Portugal
- Height: 1.83 m (6 ft 0 in)
- Position: Striker

Team information
- Current team: Stade Tunisien (manager)

Youth career
- 1997–1998: Lousanense
- 1999–2000: União Coimbra
- 2001–2002: Mirandense
- 2002–2006: Académica

Senior career*
Years	Team	Apps	(Gls)
2006	Pampilhosa	8	(1)
2007	Mirandense		
2007–2008	Zwolle	38	(17)
2008	Alavés	0	(0)
2009	Lokomotiv Mezdra	9	(0)
2009–2011	Servette	26	(9)
2010–2011	→ Aves (loan)	28	(6)
2011–2012	União Madeira	28	(6)
2012–2013	Naval	16	(7)
2013	Beira-Mar	2	(0)
2013–2014	Tondela	22	(7)
2014	Olhanense	7	(0)
2014–2015	Tondela	44	(23)
2015–2016	Mouscron	7	(1)
2016	→ Chaves (loan)	12	(1)
2016–2018	Académica	37	(10)
2017	→ Famalicão (loan)	9	(2)
2018–2019	Lusitânia	8	(2)
Total		301	(92)

Managerial career
- 2020–2022: Oliveira Hospital
- 2022–2024: Tondela
- 2024: Gil Vicente
- 2024–2025: Farense
- 2026–: Stade Tunisien
- * Club domestic league appearances and goals

António José Marreco de Gouveia (born 25 July 1987), known as Tozé Marreco, is a Portuguese former professional footballer who played as a striker. He is the manager of Tunisian Ligue Professionnelle 1 club Stade Tunisien.

In a journeyman career that included nine Primeira Liga games for Beira-Mar and Olhanense, he played 197 games and scored 62 goals in the second tier for seven clubs and was Player of the Season as Tondela won the title in 2015. He also had brief spells in five foreign countries.

== Playing career ==
=== Youth ===
Born in Miranda do Corvo, Coimbra District, Marreco began his youth career at local CD Lousanense, subsequently moving to another club in the region, C.F. União de Coimbra.

At União, he played in several attacking positions including in midfield, but was ultimately dispensed with at the end of the 2001–02 season, going on to finish his development with regional giants Académica de Coimbra, where he was a prolific goal scorer.

=== Professionals ===
In January 2007, after starting professionally with F.C. Pampilhosa, Marreco signed for CA Mirandense also in the third division. On 12 August, a phone call from his agent Jorge Baidek offered an invitation from Dutch Eerste Divisie side FC Zwolle, and he agreed to a contract later in the month. He had a very successful season, being the second-best Portuguese scorer abroad only trailing Cristiano Ronaldo while also helping his team to the promotion playoffs (finally without success) and the quarter-finals of the KNVB Cup, where they lost to eventuals winner Feyenoord.

Marreco joined Deportivo Alavés in the Spanish Segunda División in the summer of 2008, but did not play any competitive matches with the Basques. On 22 January 2009 he moved to Bulgaria's FC Lokomotiv Mezdra on a three-year deal, making his debut two days later in a 6–0 friendly rout of FC Botev Krivodol where he scored twice.

On 30 June 2009, Marreco signed a two-year contract with Servette FC of the Swiss Challenge League. He then returned to his country, being loaned to C.D. Aves in a season-long move. In his debut as starter, on 28 October 2010, he scored a hat-trick in a 3–2 home win against Portimonense S.C. in the second round of the Taça da Liga.

Marreco continued competing mainly in the Segunda Liga the following years, with C.F. União, Associação Naval 1º de Maio and C.D. Tondela (two spells). In between, he also made a total of nine Primeira Liga appearances for S.C. Beira-Mar and S.C. Olhanense, failing to find the net.

In 2014–15, his second stint with Tondela, Marreco was crowned the competition joint-top scorer at 23 goals, helping the Viseu-based club reach the top flight for the first time in its history. On 31 August 2015, he signed with Belgian Pro League side Royal Mouscron-Péruwelz, but was loaned back to his country's second tier with G.D. Chaves in February.

In July 2016, Marreco returned to Académica after 11 years away, joining a club that had just been relegated from the top division. Having been loaned halfway through his first season to fellow league team F.C. Famalicão, he terminated his contract by mutual consent in June 2018.

In December 2018, Marreco dropped down a level and signed for Lusitânia FC.

== Coaching career ==
After coaching in the youth ranks of Académica, Marreco was appointed at F.C. Oliveira do Hospital of the Campeonato de Portugal in June 2020. In his first season as a senior manager, he led the team to promotion to Liga 3; they avoided relegation in the following campaign.

On 15 June 2022, Marreco returned to Tondela as coach for the upcoming second-tier season. His debut for the newly relegated side was a 3–0 loss to FC Porto in the Supertaça Cândido de Oliveira on 30 July.

Marreco moved to the main division on 13 April 2024, on a contract at Gil Vicente F.C. until June 2025. On 8 August, however, unhappy with the club's signing policy, he resigned.

On 25 September 2024, Marreco replaced José Mota at the helm of bottom-placed S.C. Farense.

== Managerial statistics ==
As of 17 May 2025

Managerial record by team and tenure
Team	Nat	From	To	Record								Ref
Team	Nat	From	To	G	W	D	L	GF	GA	GD	Win %	Ref
Oliveira Hospital	(Portugal)	18 June 2020	15 June 2022	58	19	25	14	68	64	+4	32.76	
Tondela	(Portugal)	15 June 2022	10 April 2024	78	23	34	21	91	89	+2	29.49	
Gil Vicente	(Portugal)	13 April 2024	8 August 2024	5	2	2	1	6	4	+2	40.00	
Farense	(Portugal)	25 September 2024	29 May 2025	31	8	9	14	30	39	−9	25.81	
Total				172	52	70	50	195	196	−1	30.23	—

== Honours ==
Tondela

- Segunda Liga: 2014–15

Individual

- Segunda Liga Player of the Year: 2014–15
