= Nuno Esgueirão =

Portuguese footballer

Personal information
- Full name: Nuno Filipe Esgueirão Duarte Vieira
- Date of birth: 11 January 1999 (age 27)
- Place of birth: Coimbra, Portugal
- Height: 1.77 m (5 ft 10 in)
- Position: Left-back

Team information
- Current team: Águeda
- Number: 4

Youth career
- 2007–2014: Porto
- 2014: → Padroense (loan)
- 2015–2019: Académica

Senior career*
Years	Team	Apps	(Gls)
2017–2019	Académica	1	(0)
2019	Anadia	0	(0)
2019–2023	Oliveira do Bairro	81	(8)
2023	Florgrade	1	(0)
2023–2025	Ovarense	62	(2)
2025–	Águeda	14	(1)
- * Club domestic league appearances and goals as of 18:30, 24 December 2025 (UTC)

Nuno Filipe Esgueirão Duarte Vieira (born 11 January 1999) is a Portuguese professional footballer who plays as a left-back for Águeda.

== Career ==
On 19 April 2017, Esgueirão made his professional debut with Académica in a 2016–17 LigaPro match against Freamunde.
