= Rúben Alfaiate =

Portuguese footballer (born 1995)

Personal information
- Full name: Rúben Correia Alfaiate
- Date of birth: 17 August 1995 (age 31)
- Place of birth: Peniche, Portugal
- Height: 1.81 m (5 ft 11 in)
- Position: Goalkeeper

Team information
- Current team: GDC Roriz
- Number: 12

Youth career
- 2003–2009: Peniche
- 2009–2013: Benfica
- 2013–2014: Rio Ave
- 2014: → Oeiras (loan)

Senior career*
Years	Team	Apps	(Gls)
2014–2015	Oriental	1	(0)
2015–2016	Penalva do Castelo	27	(0)
2016–2017	Benfica e Castelo Branco	1	(0)
2017–2018	CR de Ferreira de Aves	18	(0)
2018–2020	CA Molelos	30	(0)
2020	Lusitano FCV	0	(0)
2020–	GDC Roriz	7	(0)

International career
2011–2012	Portugal U17	3	(0)
2012	Portugal U18	1	(0)
- * Club domestic league appearances and goals as of 14:22, 23 January 2021 (UTC)

Rúben Correia Alfaiate (born 17 August 1995) is a Portuguese footballer who plays for GDC Roriz as a goalkeeper.

== Career ==
On 10 May 2015, Alfaiate made his professional debut with Oriental in a 2014–15 Segunda Liga match against Leixões.

== Personal life ==
He is an identical twin brother of Alexandre Alfaiate.
