= Nuno Santos (footballer, born 1980) =

Portuguese footballer

Personal information
- Full name: Nuno Filipe Oliveira dos Santos
- Date of birth: 19 June 1980 (age 46)
- Place of birth: Viana do Castelo, Portugal
- Height: 1.81 m (5 ft 11 1/2 in)
- Positions: Forward; full-back

Youth career
- 1992–1994: Valenciano
- 1994–1995: Ribeira de Pena
- 1995–1996: Vitória Guimarães
- 1996–1997: Pevidém
- 1997: Vitória Guimarães
- 1998: Pevidém
- 1998–1999: Vizela

Senior career*
Years	Team	Apps	(Gls)
1999–2000	Serzedelo		
2000–2002	Oliveira Hospital	32	(5)
2002–2003	Torreense	33	(8)
2003	Académico Viseu	5	(0)
2003–2004	Oliveirense	30	(8)
2004–2005	Varzim	24	(3)
2005–2008	Oliveirense	72	(18)
2008–2010	Santa Clara	58	(12)
2010–2014	Paços Ferreira	49	(0)
2014–2016	Tondela	56	(6)
2016–2017	Académica	30	(0)
Total		389	(60)
- * Club domestic league appearances and goals

Nuno Filipe Oliveira dos Santos (born 19 June 1980) is a Portuguese former professional footballer who played mainly as a forward but also as a full-back (right or left).

== Club career ==
Born in Viana do Castelo, Santos spent his early career in the third and fourth divisions, reaching the Segunda Liga in 2004 with Varzim SC. Four years later, he was signed by another club in that tier, Azores' C.D. Santa Clara, starting in all league games during the season and scoring nine goals, including two braces.

In May 2010, having again been a starter with Santa Clara in the 2009–10 campaign, the 30-year-old Santos signed a two-year contract with Primeira Liga club F.C. Paços de Ferreira. He appeared in 14 matches in his first year, totalling 430 minutes of action and failing to score.

Santos retired in 2017 at the age of 37, after spells with C.D. Tondela and Académica de Coimbra.
