= Felipe Augusto (footballer, born 1993) =

Brazilian footballer

Personal information
- Full name: Felipe Augusto de Abreu
- Date of birth: 31 August 1993 (age 33)
- Place of birth: Rio de Janeiro, Brazil
- Height: 1.70 m (5 ft 7 in)
- Position: Forward

Team information
- Current team: Rio Tinto
- Number: 17

Youth career
- 2011: Serrano
- 2012: Braga

Senior career*
Years	Team	Apps	(Gls)
2012	Vidago	10	(0)
2013	Tourizense	10	(0)
2013–2018	Vizela	123	(10)
2018–2019	Trofense	28	(5)
2019–2020	Varzim	1	(0)
2020	→ Trofense (loan)	6	(0)
2021–2022	Ribeirão	13	(1)
2022	Serzedelo	8	(0)
2022–	Rio Tinto	10	(0)
- * Club domestic league appearances and goals as of 18:22, 10 June 2023 (UTC)

Felipe Augusto de Abreu, known as Felipe Augusto or Felipe Abreu (born 31 August 1993) is a Brazilian footballer who plays as a forward for Rio Tinto.

== Career ==
Felipe Augusto made his professional debut in the Segunda Liga for Vizela on 6 August 2016 in a game against Académico de Viseu.
