= José Costa (footballer, born 1994) =

Portuguese footballer (born 1994)

Personal information
- Full name: José Pedro Gonçalves Costa
- Date of birth: 9 April 1994 (age 32)
- Place of birth: Oliveira do Bairro, Portugal
- Height: 1.87 m (6 ft 1 1/2 in)
- Position: Goalkeeper

Team information
- Current team: Salgueiros
- Number: 33

Youth career
- 2005–2006: Oliveira do Bairro
- 2006–2013: Benfica

Senior career*
Years	Team	Apps	(Gls)
2013−2014	Oliveira do Bairro	30	(0)
2014−2016	Braga B	22	(0)
2016−2017	Académica	3	(0)
2017−2019	Penafiel	21	(0)
2019	Universitatea Cluj	2	(0)
2019–2020	Cova da Piedade	3	(0)
2020–2022	Alverca	55	(0)
2022–2023	Anadia	28	(0)
2023–2024	Lusitânia	30	(0)
2024–2025	Paredes	10	(0)
2025–2026	Vianense	32	(0)
2026–	Salgueiros	4	(0)

International career
2010	Portugal U16	6	(0)
2011−2012	Portugal U17	10	(0)
2013	Portugal U18	2	(0)
2013	Portugal U19	6	(0)
- * Club domestic league appearances and goals as of 13 September 2026

José Pedro Gonçalves da Costa (born 9 April 1994) is a Portuguese footballer who plays as a goalkeeper for Campeonato de Portugal club Salgueiros.

== Football career ==
On 17 September 2014, Costa made his professional debut with Braga B in a 2014–15 Segunda Liga match against Académico Viseu.

On 28 June 2019, Costa signed a 2-year contract with Liga II side FC Universitatea Cluj.
