= Jorge Prado (footballer, born 1995) =

Colombian footballer

Personal information
- Full name: Jorge González Prado
- Date of birth: 23 May 1995 (age 31)
- Place of birth: Colombia
- Position: Forward

Team information
- Current team: Olhanense
- Number: 7

Senior career*
Years	Team	Apps	(Gls)
2014–	Olhanense	39	(1)
- * Club domestic league appearances and goals as of 20:42, 31 July 2014 (UTC) ‡ National team caps and goals as of 14 June 2014

Jorge González Prado (born 23 May 1995) is a Colombian footballer who plays for S.C. Olhanense as a striker.
