= Nelson Semperena =

Uruguayan footballer (born 1984)

Nelson Eusebio Semperena González (born February 19, 1984, in Montevideo) is a Uruguayan footballer currently playing for Los Caimanes of the Peruvian Primera División.

== Teams ==
- (Uruguay) Defensor Sporting 2002–2007
- (Uruguay) Central Español 2008–2010
- (Venezuela) Zamora F.C. 2011–2012
- (Uruguay) Liverpool 2012–2013
- (Uruguay) Huracán 2013–2014
- (Peru) Los Caimanes 2014–present

== Titles ==
- (Uruguay) Defensor Sporting 2006 (Copa Libertadores Playoff)
- (Uruguay) Defensor Sporting 2007 (Campeón Torneo Apertura 2007)
- Zamora Futbol Club 2011 (Campeón Torneo Clausura 2011 - Venezuela)
