= Paulo Rosales =

Argentine footballer

Personal information
- Full name: Paulo Roberto Rosales
- Date of birth: 10 January 1984 (age 42)
- Place of birth: Cosquín, Argentina
- Height: 1.68 m (5 ft 6 in)
- Position: Midfielder

Team information
- Current team: General Paz Juniors

Youth career
- Newell's Old Boys

Senior career*
Years	Team	Apps	(Gls)
2002–2005	Newell's Old Boys	24	(0)
2005–2012	Unión de Santa Fe	187	(33)
2008	→ Talleres (loan)	20	(6)
2009	→ Olympiacos Volos (loan)	7	(2)
2012	Independiente	15	(0)
2013	Bahia	8	(0)
2013	Olimpo	17	(1)
2014–2015	Unión La Calera	47	(9)
2015–2016	Santiago Wanderers	23	(3)
2016–2017	Instituto	38	(7)
2017	Unión La Calera	16	(2)
2018	Oriente Petrolero	11	(1)
2020–	General Paz Juniors	6	(2)
- * Club domestic league appearances and goals as of 19:36, 11 June 2020 (UTC)

Paulo Roberto Rosales (born January 10, 1984, in Cosquín, Argentina) is an Argentine footballer currently playing for General Paz Juniors.

== Honours ==
=== Club ===
Independiente

- Primera División (1): 2004
