= João Traquina =

Portuguese footballer (born 1988)

Personal information
- Full name: João Miguel Traquina André
- Date of birth: 29 August 1988 (age 38)
- Place of birth: Alcobaça, Portugal
- Height: 1.77 m (5 ft 10 in)
- Position: Forward

Youth career
- 1997–2002: Alcobaça
- 2002–2003: Benfica
- 2003–2004: Alcobaça
- 2004–2007: Académica

Senior career*
Years	Team	Apps	(Gls)
2007–2010	Académica	0	(0)
2007–2009	→ Tourizense (loan)	61	(6)
2009	→ Estoril (loan)	0	(0)
2009–2010	→ Tourizense (loan)	15	(1)
2010–2011	Pampilhosa	23	(3)
2011–2012	Sertanense	29	(5)
2012–2013	Fafe	24	(1)
2013	Naval	7	(1)
2013–2014	Sertanense	20	(3)
2014–2015	Covilhã	44	(9)
2015–2016	Belenenses	6	(0)
2016	→ Covilhã (loan)	20	(2)
2016–2022	Académica	148	(19)
2022	Trofense	7	(0)
2023–2024	Covilhã	41	(5)
2024–2025	União Coimbra	23	(3)
Total		468	(58)

International career
2006–2007	Portugal U19	3	(0)
- * Club domestic league appearances and goals

João Miguel Traquina André (born 29 August 1988), known as Traquina, is a Portuguese former professional footballer who played as a forward.

== Club career ==
Born in Alcobaça, Leiria District, Traquina finished his youth career with Académica de Coimbra. He played lower league football until the age of 25, with G.D. Tourizense (two spells), F.C. Pampilhosa, Sertanense FC, AD Fafe, Associação Naval 1º de Maio and Sertanense FC. He was part of G.D. Estoril Praia's Segunda Liga roster in the first part of the 2009–10 season, but failed to appear for the club.

In May 2014, Traquina signed for S.C. Covilhã in the second division. He made his debut in the competition on 9 August, playing the full 90 minutes in a 1–1 away draw against Portimonense SC.

Traquina joined Primeira Liga club C.F. Os Belenenses on 29 May 2015, with the deal being made effective on 1 July. He played his first match in the competition on 15 August, as a second-half substitute for Abel Camará in the 3–3 home draw with Rio Ave FC. After only nine competitive appearances, he finished the campaign on loan to Covilhã.

Traquina returned to the second tier in the summer of 2016, going on to spend several seasons with Académica.
