= Alexandre Alfaiate =

Portuguese footballer

Personal information
- Full name: Alexandre Correia Alfaiate
- Date of birth: 17 August 1995 (age 31)
- Place of birth: Peniche, Portugal
- Height: 1.83 m (6 ft 0 in)
- Position: Centre back

Team information
- Current team: Pas de la Casa
- Number: 2

Youth career
- 2003–2007: Peniche
- 2007–2014: Benfica

Senior career*
Years	Team	Apps	(Gls)
2014–2017	Benfica B	37	(0)
2016–2017	→ Académica (loan)	5	(0)
2017–2018	Tubize	1	(0)
2018–2019	Lusitanos	11	(1)
2019	Lusitano FCV	9	(0)
2019–2020	Ordino	22	(3)
2020–2021	Penya Encarnada	19	(2)
2021	Atlètic Club d'Escaldes	3	(0)
2022	Ordino	15	(0)
2022	Penya Encarnada	13	(0)
2023–	Pas de la Casa	58	(3)

International career^{‡}
2010–2011	Portugal U16	12	(1)
2012	Portugal U17	9	(0)
2013	Portugal U18	9	(2)
2014	Portugal U19	3	(0)
- * Club domestic league appearances and goals as of 10 June 2025 ‡ National team caps and goals as of 6 July 2016

Alexandre Correia Alfaiate (born 17 August 1995) is a Portuguese professional footballer who plays as a defender for Pas de la Casa.

== Club career ==
On 9 August 2014, Alfaiate made his debut with S.L. Benfica B in a 2014–15 Segunda Liga match against C.D. Trofense where he played the entire match as left back. On 30 July 2017, he signed a two-year contract with Belgian First Division B side A.F.C. Tubize.

== Personal life ==
He is an identical twin brother of Rúben Alfaiate.

== Honours ==
Benfica

- UEFA Youth League: Runner-up 2013–14
