= 2019–20 Associação Académica de Coimbra – O.A.F. season =

Académica
2018–19 season
- President: Pedro Dias Roxo
- Coach: César Peixoto (until 14 November 2019); João Carlos Pereira (from 18 November 2019)
- Stadium: Estádio Cidade de Coimbra
- LigaPro: TBD
- Taça de Portugal: Fourth Round
- Taça da Liga: First round

The 2019–20 season is Académica's fourth season in the LigaPro. This season they will also take part in the Taça de Portugal and Taça da Liga.

== Pre-season and friendlies ==
Win Draw Loss

6 July 2019 Friendly	Académica (Portugal)	0–0	(Portugal) Anadia	Coimbra
10:30 WEST (UTC+01:00)				Stadium: Academia Dolce Vita

13 July 2019 Taça Hospital da Luz	Académica (Portugal)	0–8	(Portugal) Benfica	Coimbra
20:15 WEST (UTC+01:00)			Rafa Silva 23'; Raúl de Tomás 24', 45+6'; Conti 51', 84'; Pizzi 60'; Seferovic 62'; Taarabt 89'	Stadium: Estádio Cidade de Coimbra; Attendance: 17,350

20 July 2019 Friendly	Académica (Portugal)	0–0	(Portugal) Aves	Coimbra
10:00 WEST (UTC+01:00)				Stadium: Estádio Cidade de Coimbra

23 July 2019 Troféu Crédito Agrícola	Académica (Portugal)	2–0	(Portugal) União de Leiria	Coimbra
21:00 WEST	Reko 49'; Dany 56'			Stadium: Estádio Cidade de Coimbra; Attendance: 2,619

== Competitions ==
=== Overall record ===
Competition	First match	Last match	Starting round	Record							
Competition	First match	Last match	Starting round	Pld	W	D	L	GF	GA	GD	Win %
LigaPro	11 August 2019	19 May 2020	Matchday 1	18	7	4	7	27	23	+4	38.89
Taça de Portugal	29 September 2019	23 November 2019	2nd round	3	2	0	1	3	2	+1	66.67
Taça da Liga	27 July 2019	3 August 2019	2nd round	2	0	1	1	1	3	−2	0.00
Total				23	9	5	9	31	28	+3	39.13

Last updated: 26 January 2020

=== LigaPro ===
==== League table ====
Pos	Team	Pld	W	D	L	GF	GA	GD	Pts
6	Varzim	17	7	6	4	24	21	+3	27
7	Estoril	17	8	1	8	24	20	+4	25
8	Académica	17	7	3	7	26	22	+4	24
9	Penafiel	17	6	6	5	19	15	+4	24
10	Leixões	17	6	6	5	19	18	+1	24

Updated to match(es) played on 22 January 2020. Source:
Rules for classification: 1) Points; 2) Head-to-head points; 3) Head-to-head goal difference; 4) Head-to-head away goals scored; 5) Goal difference; 6) Matches won; 7) Goals scored; 8) Play-off.
(Note: The LPFP decided that only criteria 1, 5, 6 and 7 would be applied to establish the classification during the competition.)

==== Results by round ====
Round	1	2	3	4	5	6	7	8	9	10	11	12	13	14	15	16	17	18	19	20	21	22	23	24	25	26	27	28	29	30	31	32	33	34
Ground	H	A	H	A	H	H	A	H	A	H	A	H	A	H	A	H	A	A	H	A	H	A	A	H	A	H	A	H	A	H	A	H	A	H
Result	W	D	L	L	L	D	D	W	L	L	L	W	W	W	W	W	L	D																
Position	7	4	8	14	15	15	14	14	14	15	15	15	13	10	9	7	9	9																

Updated to match(es) played on 26 January 2020. Source: [[[Category:All articles with unsourced statements]]
A = Away; H = Home; W = Win; D = Draw; L = Loss

==== Matches ====
11 August 2019 1	Académica	3–2	Leixões	Coimbra
11:15 WEST (UTC+01:00)	André Claro 13'; Chaby 54'; Ricardo Dias 87'	Report	Harramiz 33', 56'	Stadium: Estádio Cidade de Coimbra; Attendance: 2,036; Referee: João Bento

17 August 2019 2	Académico Viseu	0–0	Académica	Viseu
11:00 WEST (UTC+01:00)		Report		Stadium: Estádio do Fontelo; Attendance: 1,250; Referee: Iancu Vasilica

24 August 2019 3	Académica	1–2	Chaves	Coimbra
11:00 WEST (UTC+01:00)	Mike 8'	Report	Diego Galo 3'; Guzzo 68'	Stadium: Estádio Cidade de Coimbra; Attendance: 2,242; Referee: David Silva

1 September 2019 4	Mafra	1–0	Académica	Mafra
16:00 WEST (UTC+01:00)	Flávio Silva 89'	Report		Stadium: Estádio Municipal de Mafra; Attendance: 730; Referee: Anzhony Rodrigues

15 September 2019 5	Académica	1–2	Nacional	Coimbra
11:00 WEST (UTC+01:00)	Chaby 50'	Report	Róchez 25' (pen.); Camacho 52'	Stadium: Estádio Cidade de Coimbra; Attendance: 1,921; Referee: Hugo Miguel

22 September 2019 6	Académica	1–1	Feirense	Coimbra
18:15 WEST (UTC+01:00)	Zé Castro 90+5' (pen.)	Report	Silvério 81' (o.g.)	Stadium: Estádio Cidade de Coimbra; Attendance: 3,246; Referee: Jorge Sousa

5 October 2019 8	Académica	1–0	Benfica B	Coimbra
11:00 WEST (UTC+01:00)	Silvério 37'	Report		Stadium: Estádio Cidade de Coimbra; Attendance: 2,054; Referee: Rui Oliveira

26 October 2019 7	Penafiel	0–0	Académica	Penafiel
11:00 WEST (UTC+01:00)		Report		Stadium: Estádio Municipal 25 de Abril; Attendance: 438; Referee: Manuel Oliveira

3 November 2019 9	Varzim	2–1	Académica	Póvoa de Varzim
15:00 WET (UTC±00:00)	Leo Ruiz 8'; Alan Henrique 19'	Report	Zé Castro 33' (pen.)	Stadium: Estádio do Varzim SC; Attendance: 1,379; Referee: Sérgio Guelho

9 November 2019 10	Académica	1–2	Farense	Coimbra
15:00 WET (UTC±00:00)	Mendes 29'	Report	Fabrício 36' (pen.); Fabrício Isidoro 86'	Stadium: Estádio Cidade de Coimbra; Attendance: 1,673; Referee: Iancu Vasilica

30 November 2019 11	Vilafranquense	3–2	Académica	Rio Maior
15:00 WET (UTC±00:00)	Pepo 18'; Wilson 65'; Marco Grilo 76'	Report	Mike 57'; Hugo Almeida 90+5'	Stadium: Estádio Municipal de Rio Maior; Attendance: 1 Referee: Anzhony Rodrigues

8 December 2019 12	Académica	1–2	Farense	Coimbra
15:00 WET (UTC±00:00)	Marcos Paulo 5'; Barnes 61', 67'	Report	Kenidy 8'	Stadium: Estádio Cidade de Coimbra; Attendance: 1,429; Referee: Hugo Silva

15 December 2019 13	Covilhã	1–2	Académica	Covilhã
15:00 WET (UTC±00:00)	Brendon 65'	Report	Traquina 74'; Djoussé 90+3'	Stadium: Estádio Municipal José dos Santos Pinto; Attendance: 420; Referee: Hélder Malheiro

28 December 2019 14	Académica	4–3	Oliveirense	Coimbra
17:15 WET (UTC±00:00)	Traquina 12'; Silvério 30'; Derik 53'; Francisco Moura 62'	Report	Fabinho 8' (pen.); Malele 55'; Agdon 70'	Stadium: Estádio Cidade de Coimbra; Attendance: 2,140; Referee: João Malheiro Pinto

5 January 2020 15	Porto B	1–3	Académica	Pedroso
15:00 WET (UTC±00:00)	Vítor Ferreira 36' (pen.)	Report	Zé Castro 19' (pen.); Silvério 61'; Derik 71'	Stadium: Estádio Municipal Jorge Sampaio; Attendance: 477; Referee: Miguel Nogueira

12 January 2020 16	Académica	3–0	Cova da Piedade	Coimbra
17:15 WET (UTC±00:00)	Traquina 44'; Ricardo Dias 62'; Djoussé 84'	Report		Stadium: Estádio Cidade de Coimbra; Attendance: 3,346; Referee: David Silva

18 January 2020 17	Estoril	1–0	Académica	Estoril
11:00 WET (UTC±00:00)	André Franco 90+3'	Report		Stadium: Estádio António Coimbra da Mota; Attendance: 718; Referee: Iancu Vasilica

26 January 2020 18	Leixões	1–1	Académica	Matosinhos
15:00 WET (UTC±00:00)	Bura 22'	Report	Djoussé 86'	Stadium: Estádio do Mar; Attendance: 718; Referee: Iancu Vasilica

=== Taça de Portugal ===
==== Second round ====
29 September 2019	Lusitano Vildemoinhos	0–1	Académica	Vildemoinhos, Viseu
15:00 WEST (UTC+01:00)			Arghus 49'	Stadium: Estádio dos Trambelos

==== Third round ====
20 October 2019	Académica	2–1	Portimonense	Coimbra
15:00 WEST (UTC+01:00)	Ki 53'; Djoussé 90'		Jackson Martínez 88'	Stadium: Estádio Cidade de Coimbra; Attendance: Vítor Ferreira; Referee: 1,440

==== Fourth round ====
23 November 2019	Famalicão	1–0	Académica	Vila Nova de Famalicão
15:00 WET (UTC±00:00)	Toni Martínez 44'			Stadium: Estádio Municipal 22 de Junho; Attendance: Gustavo Correia

=== Taça da Liga ===
==== First round ====
27 July 2019	Académica	1–1 (4–3 p)	Farense	Coimbra
20:30 WEST (UTC+01:00)	Reko 89'	Report	78' André Vieira	Stadium: Estádio Cidade de Coimbra; Attendance: 1,533; Referee: João Gonçalves
	Penalties
	Leandro (penalty scored); Zé Castro (penalty scored); Barnes (penalty scored); Mauro (penalty missed); Dany (penalty scored)		(penalty missed) Alvarinho; (penalty scored) Cássio; (penalty scored) Fabrício; (penalty scored) Bandarra; (penalty missed) Irobiso

==== Second round ====
3 August 2019	Portimonense	2–0	Académica	Portimão
18:00 WEST (UTC+01:00)	Paulinho 18'; Aylton 45+2'	Report		Stadium: Estádio Municipal de Portimão; Attendance: 1,985; Referee: Manuel Oliveira

== Players ==
=== Appearances and goals ===
As of match played on 26 January 2020

No.	Pos.	Nat.	Player	Primeira Liga			Taça de Portugal			Taça da Liga			Total		
1	GK	(Portugal)	Daniel Azevedo	0	0	0	0	0	0	0	0	0	0	0	0
4	DF	(Portugal)	Silvério	10	2	3	2	0	0	2	0	0	14	2	3
5	DF	(Portugal)	Mauro Cerqueira	15	1	0	3	0	0	2	0	0	20	1	0
6	MF	(Portugal)	Ricardo Dias	16	0	2	3	0	0	0	0	0	19	0	2
8	MF	(South Korea)	Hwang Mun-ki	8	2	0	1	0	1	2	0	0	11	2	1
10	MF	(Portugal)	Leandro Silva	9	6	0	1	2	0	2	0	0	12	8	0
16	MF	(Portugal)	João Mendes	12	3	1	2	0	0	0	0	0	14	3	1
17	FW	(Ghana)	Barnes Osei	16	1	2	3	0	0	2	0	0	21	1	2
19	FW	(Portugal)	Daniel Costa	0	4	0	0	0	0	0	2	0	0	6	0
20	FW	(Portugal)	João Traquina	8	3	3	1	2	0	0	0	0	9	5	3
22	MF	(Portugal)	Filipe Chaby	9	3	2	0	1	0	2	0	0	11	4	2
23	DF	(Portugal)	Mike Moura	17	0	2	3	0	0	1	0	0	21	0	2
24	GK	(Portugal)	Tiago Pereira	6	0	-8	0	0	0	2	0	-3	8	0	-11
27	MF	(Brazil)	Derik Lacerda	9	1	2	2	1	0	0	0	0	11	2	2
31	MF	(Brazil)	Marcos Paulo	12	3	1	3	0	0	0	1	0	15	4	1
33	DF	(Portugal)	António Ribeiro	0	0	0	0	0	0	0	0	0	0	0	0
34	DF	(Portugal)	Zé Maria	0	0	0	0	0	0	0	0	0	0	0	0
35	DF	(Portugal)	Sérgio Conceição	1	0	0	0	0	0	0	0	0	1	0	0
39	FW	(Cameroon)	Donald Djoussé	4	7	3	0	2	1	0	0	0	4	9	4
55	DF	(Brazil)	Arghus	7	2	0	1	0	1	0	0	0	8	2	1
65	MF	(Portugal)	Fernando Alexandre	0	0	0	0	0	0	0	0	0	0	0	0
66	MF	(Portugal)	João Lameira	0	0	0	0	0	0	0	0	0	0	0	0
74	DF	(Portugal)	Francisco Moura	4	0	1	0	0	0	0	0	0	4	0	1
77	FW	(Cape Verde)	Brito	0	0	0	0	0	0	0	0	0	0	0	0
83	DF	(Portugal)	Zé Castro	12	0	3	3	0	0	2	0	0	17	0	3
88	MF	(Portugal)	Pedro Pinto	0	1	0	0	0	0	0	0	0	0	1	0
91	GK	(Portugal)	Mika	12	0	-15	3	0	-3	0	0	0	15	0	-18
Players transferred out during the season
9	FW	(Portugal)	Hugo Almeida	2	8	1	1	1	0	1	1	0	4	10	1
11	FW	(Brazil)	Romário Correia	0	1	0	0	0	0	0	0	0	0	1	0
15	DF	(Brazil)	Matheus Mancini	0	0	0	0	0	0	0	0	0	0	0	0
18	FW	(Portugal)	André Claro	2	0	1	0	0	0	1	1	0	3	1	1
21	FW	(Colombia)	Daniel Mantilla	0	0	0	0	0	0	0	0	0	0	0	0
28	MF	(Portugal)	Reko	0	0	0	0	0	0	2	0	1	2	0	1
30	MF	(Portugal)	David Teles	0	0	0	0	0	0	0	1	0	0	1	0
44	DF	(Brazil)	Yuri Matias	2	1	0	0	0	0	0	0	0	2	1	0
75	FW	(Guinea)	Tafsir Chérif	0	3	0	1	0	0	0	0	0	1	3	0
90	GK	(Portugal)	Júlio Neiva	0	0	0	0	0	0	0	0	0	0	0	0

Source: Equipa

=== Transfers ===
==== Summer ====
===== In =====
No.	Pos.	Nat.	Name	Age	Moving from	Type	Transfer window	Ends	Transfer fee	Source
1	GK	(Portugal)	Daniel Azevedo	21	Benfica	Transfer	Summer	2021	Free	slbenfica.pt
4	DF	(Portugal)	Silvério	23	Rio Ave	Transfer	Summer	2021	Free	academica-oaf.pt
5	DF	(Portugal)	Mauro Cerqueira	27	Nacional	Transfer	Summer	2021	Free	academica-oaf.pt
6	MF	(Portugal)	Ricardo Dias	28	Belenenses SAD	Loan	Summer	2020	Free	
10	MF	(Portugal)	Leandro Silva	22	AEL Limassol (Cyprus)	Loan	Summer	2020	Free	abola.pt
11	FW	(Brazil)	Romário Correia	27	Americano (Brazil)	Transfer	Summer	2020	Free	academica-oaf.pt
15	DF	(Brazil)	Matheus Mancini	24	Atlético Mineiro (Brazil)	Loan	Summer	2020	Free	academica-oaf.pt
16	MF	(Portugal)	João Mendes	24	Tondela	Loan	Summer	2020	Free	academica-oaf.pt
17	FW	(Ghana)	Barnes Osei	24	Paços Ferreira	Transfer	Summer	2020	Free	academica-oaf.pt
18	FW	(Portugal)	André Claro	28	Boavista	Transfer	Summer	2020	Free	academica-oaf.pt
21	FW	(Colombia)	Daniel Mantilla	22	Patriotas (Colombia)	Transfer	Summer	2021	Free	
22	MF	(Portugal)	Filipe Chaby	25	Sporting CP	Loan	Summer	2020	Free	academica-oaf.pt
24	GK	(Portugal)	Tiago Pereira	24	Braga	Loan	Summer	2020	Free	academica-oaf.pt
31	MF	(Brazil)	Marcos Paulo	31	Panetolikos (Greece)	Transfer	Summer	2020	Free	
35	DF	(Portugal)	Sérgio Conceição	22	Chaves	Transfer	Summer	2021	Free	academica-oaf.pt
55	DF	(Brazil)	Arghus	31	Panetolikos (Greece)	Transfer	Summer	2020	Free	
74	DF	(Portugal)	Francisco Moura	20	Braga	Loan	Summer	2021	Free	academica-oaf.pt
75	FW	(Guinea)	Tafsir Chérif	23	Varzim	Transfer	Summer	2020	Free	academica-oaf.pt
91	GK	(Portugal)	Mika	28	Belenenses SAD	Transfer	Summer	2020	Free	academica-oaf.pt

Last updated: 1 September 2019

===== Out =====
No.	Pos.	Nat.	Name	Age	Moving to	Type	Transfer window	Transfer fee	Source
1	GK	(Brazil)	Peçanha	39	Retirement	End of contract	Summer	—	
3	DF	(Brazil)	William	34	Unattached	End of contract	Summer	—	
4	DF	(Portugal)	Hugo Ribeiro	22	Condeixa	End of contract	Summer	—	Facebook
5	DF	(Portugal)	Joel Ferreira	27	Mafra	End of contract	Summer	—	O Jogo
7	FW	(Portugal)	Marinho	36	Retirement	End of contract	Summer	—	O Jogo
10	FW	(Honduras)	Jonathan Toro	22	Huesca (Spain)	Loan return	Summer	—	
11	FW	(Cape Verde)	Júnior Monteiro	28	Leixões	Contract termination	Summer	—	Record
12	MF	(Portugal)	Rúben Saldanha	31	Loures	End of contract	Summer	—	Record
13	DF	(Portugal)	João Real	36	Retirement	End of contract	Summer	—	O Jogo
17	FW	(Guinea-Bissau)	Romário Baldé	22	Lechia Gdańsk (Poland)	Loan return	Summer	—	
19	DF	(Portugal)	Nélson Pedroso	34	Merelinense	End of contract	Summer	—	Facebook
21	MF	(Portugal)	Guima	23	Sporting CP	Loan return	Summer	—	
22	DF	(Brazil)	Jean Felipe	25	Portimonense	Loan return	Summer	—	
27	MF	(Portugal)	Pedro Lagoa	22	Anadia	Loan	Summer	—	A Bola
31	FW	(Nigeria)	Femi Balogun	26	Cova da Piedade	End of contract	Summer	—	Record
41	GK	(Portugal)	Ricardo Moura	30	Chaves	End of contract	Summer	—	
43	DF	(Brazil)	Brendon	24	Portimonense	Loan return	Summer	—	
66	FW	(Portugal)	Diogo Ribeiro	28	Vizela	End of contract	Summer	—	Record
77	FW	(Portugal)	Rodrigo Vilela	24	Torreense	End of contract	Summer	—	

Last updated: 1 September 2019

==== Winter ====
===== In =====
No.	Pos.	Nat.	Name	Age	Moving from	Type	Transfer window	Ends	Transfer fee	Source
66	MF	(Portugal)	João Lameira	20	União de Leiria	Loan	Summer	2021	Free	academica-oaf.pt
11	FW	(Cape Verde)	Brito	32	Dinamo București (Romania)	Transfer	Summer	2020	Free	academica-oaf.pt

Last updated: 1 February 2020

===== Out =====
No.	Pos.	Nat.	Name	Age	Moving to	Type	Transfer window	Transfer fee	Source
9	FW	(Portugal)	Hugo Almeida	35	Retirement	End of contract	Summer	—	academica-oaf.pt
11	FW	(Brazil)	Romário Correia	28	Americano (Brazil)	Contract termination	Summer	—	academica-oaf.pt
15	DF	(Brazil)	Matheus Mancini	25	Atlético Mineiro (Brazil)	Loan return	Summer	—	academica-oaf.pt
21	FW	(Colombia)	Daniel Mantilla	23	Patriotas (Colombia)	Loan return	Summer	—	
27	MF	(Portugal)	Pedro Lagoa	22	Etar (Bulgaria)	Contract termination	Summer	—	TopSport.bg
44	DF	(Brazil)	Yuri Matias	24	Tractor (Iran)	Contract termination	Summer	—	A Bola
75	FW	(Guinea)	Tafsir Chérif	23	Al-Nojoom (Saudi Arabia)	Contract termination	Summer	—	A Bola

Last updated: 1 February 2020

== Coaching staff ==
Position	Staff
Coach	(Portugal) João Carlos Pereira
Assistant Coach	(Portugal) Sérgio Gaminha
Assistant Coach	(Portugal) Bruno Ferreira
Goalkeeping Coach	(Portugal) Pejô
Scout	(Portugal) Pedro Miguel

Last updated: 18 November 2019
Source: Equipa Técnica
