= 2018–19 Associação Académica de Coimbra – O.A.F. season =

Académica
2018–19 season
- President: Pedro Dias Roxo
- Coach: Carlos Pinto (from 30 May 2018 until 1 October 2018); João Alves (from 10 October 2018)
- Stadium: Estádio Cidade de Coimbra
- LigaPro: 5th
- Taça de Portugal: Second Round
- Taça da Liga: First round
- Top goalscorer: League: Hugo Almeida (10); All: Hugo Almeida (10)
- Highest home attendance: 3,449; Académica 1–0 Oliveirense (20 January 2019)
- Lowest home attendance: 1,546; Académica 0–2 Sporting Covilhã (12 May 2019)
- Average home league attendance: 2,630
- Biggest win: Académica 4–1 Porto B (6 April 2019)
- Biggest defeat: Académica 2–7 Estoril (7 October 2018)

The 2017–18 season is Académica's third season in the LigaPro. This season they will also take part in the Taça de Portugal and Taça da Liga.

== Pre-season and friendlies ==
Win Draw Loss

7 July 2018 Friendly	Académica (Portugal)	1–1	(Portugal) Anadia	Coimbra
10:30 WEST (UTC+01:00)	Ki 45'		Marcelo 34'	Stadium: Academia Dolce Vita

11 July 2018 Friendly	Tondela (Portugal)	2–1	(Portugal) Académica	Luso
10:30 WEST (UTC+01:00)	Nélson Pedroso 35' (o.g.); Joãozinho 76'		Diogo Ribeiro 55'	Stadium: Centro de Estágios de Luso

14 July 2018 Friendly	Porto (Portugal)	3–0	(Portugal) Académica	Olival, Portugal
	André Pereira; Bruno Costa; Adrián López			Stadium: CTFD PortoGaia

17 July 2018 Troféu Crédito Agrícola	Académica (Portugal)	0–0 (a.e.t.) (3–4 p)	(Portugal) Belenenses	Coimbra
21:00 WEST				Stadium: Estádio Cidade de Coimbra; Attendance: 2,534
	Penalties
	Zé Paulo (penalty missed); Ki (penalty missed); Joel (penalty scored); Fernando Alexandre (penalty missed)		(penalty scored) Sagna; (penalty missed) Cleylton; (penalty scored) Tiago; (penalty scored) Kikas

18 July 2018 Friendly	Oliveirense (Portugal)	0–0	(Portugal) Académica	Oliveira de Azeméis
18:00 WEST (UTC+01:00)				Stadium: Estádio Carlos Osório

25 July 2018 Friendly	Académica (Portugal)	1–1	(Portugal) Boavista	Coimbra
10:30 WEST (UTC+01:00)	Reko		Rafael Costa	Stadium: Academia Dolce Vita

28 July 2018 Friendly	Lusitânia Lourosa (Portugal)	3–0	(Portugal) Académica	Lourosa
10:30 WEST (UTC+01:00)	Guilherme; P. Silva; Roberto			Stadium: Estádio do Lusitânia FC Lourosa

1 August 2018 Friendly	Sporting CP (Portugal)	1–0	(Portugal) Académica	Alcochete
15:00 WEST (UTC+01:00)	Bas Dost 60' (pen.)			Stadium: CGD Stadium Aurélio Pereira

4 August 2018 Friendly	Feirense (Portugal)	0–2	(Portugal) Académica	Santa Maria da Feira
10:30 WEST (UTC+01:00)			Djoussé	Stadium: Estádio Marcolino de Castro

== Competitions ==
=== Overall record ===
Competition	First match	Last match	Starting round	Record							
Competition	First match	Last match	Starting round	Pld	W	D	L	GF	GA	GD	Win %
LigaPro	12 August 2018	19 May 2019	Matchday 1	34	15	6	13	36	37	−1	44.12
Taça de Portugal	30 September 2018		2nd round	1	0	0	1	0	1	−1	0.00
Taça da Liga	22 July 2018		1st round	1	0	1	0	0	0	+0	0.00
Total				36	15	7	14	36	38	−2	41.67

Last updated: 20 May 2019

=== LigaPro ===
==== League table ====
Pos	Team	Pld	W	D	L	GF	GA	GD	Pts
3	Estoril	34	16	6	12	49	42	+7	54
4	Benfica B	34	15	7	12	47	42	+5	52
5	Académica	34	15	6	13	36	37	−1	51
6	Sp. Covilhã	34	13	10	11	42	37	+5	49
7	Leixões	34	12	9	13	35	36	−1	45

Source: Liga Portugal
Rules for classification: 1) Points; 2) Head-to-head points; 3) Head-to-head goal difference; 4) Head-to-head away goals scored; 5) Goal difference; 6) Matches won; 7) Goals scored; 8) Play-off.
(Note: The LPFP decided that only criteria 1, 5, 6 and 7 would be applied to establish the classification during the competition.)

==== Results by round ====
Round	1	2	3	4	5	6	7	8	9	10	11	12	13	14	15	16	17	18	19	20	21	22	23	24	25	26	27	28	29	30	31	32	33	34
Ground	A	H	A	H	A	H	A	H	A	H	A	H	A	H	H	A	H	H	A	H	A	H	A	H	A	H	A	H	A	H	A	A	H	A
Result	D	L	D	D	W	L	L	L	W	W	L	L	W	W	W	W	W	W	L	D	W	W	L	W	W	W	L	W	L	D	D	L	L	L
Position	8	12	14	14	10	14	15	15	11	11	13	16	13	9	7	7	5	5	6	7	5	5	5	4	4	3	3	3	4	4	4	5	5	5

Updated to match(es) played on 20 May 2019. Source:
A = Away; H = Home; W = Win; D = Draw; L = Loss

==== Matches ====
11 August 2018 1	Oliveirense	1–1	Académica	Aveiro
18:00 WET (UTC+01:00)	Serginho 90+3'	Report	Djoussé 41'	Stadium: Estádio Municipal de Aveiro; Attendance: 1,037; Referee: João Matos

18 August 2018 2	Académica	0–1	Paços de Ferreira	Coimbra
11:15 WET (UTC+01:00)		Report	Uilton 9'	Stadium: Estádio Cidade de Coimbra; Attendance: 2,576; Referee: Tiago Martins

26 August 2018 3	Vitória Guimarães B	0–0	Académica	Guimarães
17:00 WET (UTC+01:00)		Report		Stadium: Estádio D. Afonso Henriques; Attendance: 1,945; Referee: Fábio Melo

1 September 2018 4	Académica	1–1	Benfica B	Coimbra
11:15 WET (UTC+01:00)	Hugo Almeida 89'	Report	Willock 9'	Stadium: Estádio Cidade de Coimbra; Attendance: 2,922; Referee: José Rodrigues

23 September 2018 5	Farense	0–2	Académica	Faro
16:00 WET (UTC+01:00)		Report	Hugo Almeida 45'; Donald Djoussé 63'	Stadium: Estádio de São Luís; Attendance: 1,590; Referee: Hélder Malheiro

7 October 2018 6	Académica	2–7	Estoril	Coimbra
11:15 WET (UTC+01:00)	Hugo Almeida 12', 53'	Report	Pedro Queirós 8'; Aylton 19'; Roberto 24'; João Vigário 45', 61'; Dadashov 74', 90+1'	Stadium: Estádio Cidade de Coimbra; Attendance: 2,662; Referee: Artur Soares Dias

29 October 2018 7	Penafiel	2–1	Académica	Penafiel
20:15 WET (UTC+01:00)	Yuri 12' (o.g.); Ludovic 65'	Report	Brendon 45+1'	Stadium: Estádio Municipal 25 de Abril; Attendance: 573; Referee: Rui Costa

4 November 2018 8	Académica	0–1	Académico de Viseu	Coimbra
17:00 WET (UTC+01:00)	Ricardo Dias (yellow card) 82'	Summary	Kevin Medina (yellow card) 3'; Nsor 84'	Stadium: Estádio Cidade de Coimbra; Attendance: 2,088; Referee: Fábio Veríssimo

11 November 2018 9	Braga B	0–1	Académica	Braga
15:00 WET (UTC+01:00)	Lucas Cunha (yellow card) 77'; Ailton (yellow card) 90+2'; Tiago Pereira (yellow card) 90+2'	Summary	Reko (yellow card) 39'; Ricardo Dias (yellow card) 44'; Júnior 71' (pen.); Ricardo Guimarães (yellow card) 74' (yellow-red card) 90'	Stadium: Estádio 1º de Maio; Attendance: 198; Referee: José Rodrigues

18 November 2018 16	Sporting Covilhã	0–1	Académica	Covilhã
14:30 WET (UTC+01:00)	Deivison (yellow card) 16'; Jean Batista (yellow card) 41'	Summary	Brendon (yellow card) 62'; Marinho 90+6'; Yuri (yellow card) 90+15'	Stadium: Estádio Municipal José dos Santos Pinto; Attendance: 315; Referee: João Pinto

1 December 2018 10	Académica	2–0	Arouca	Coimbra
15:00 WET (UTC+01:00)	Zé Castro (yellow card) 32'; Djoussé 48'; Ricardo Dias (yellow card) 53'; Reko 60' (yellow card) 64'	Summary	Ericson (yellow card) 17'; Fábio Fortes (yellow card) 66'	Stadium: Estádio Cidade de Coimbra; Attendance: 2,428; Referee: Rui Oliveira

8 December 2018 11	Porto B	3–0	Académica	Vila Nova de Gaia
15:00 WET (UTC+01:00)	Gleison 23' 57'; Rúben Macedo 27'; Costa (yellow card) 44'; Diogo Queirós (yellow card) 69'; Mbemba (yellow card) 78'	Summary	Ricardo Dias (yellow card) 88'; Joel (yellow card) 90+1'	Stadium: Estádio Municipal Jorge Sampaio; Attendance: 582; Referee: António Nobre

17 December 2018 12	Académica	0–1	Famalicão	Coimbra
20:15 WET (UTC+01:00)		Report	Zé Castro 90+4' (o.g.)	Stadium: Estádio Cidade de Coimbra; Attendance: 3,214; Referee: Marco Cruz

23 December 2018 13	Mafra	2–3	Académica	Mafra
15:00 WET (UTC+01:00)	Ruca 44'; Bruninho 67'	Report	Romário 5'; Brendon 29'; Júnior 77' (pen.)	Stadium: Estádio Municipal de Mafra; Attendance: 836; Referee: Gustavo Correia

30 December 2018 14	Académica	2–1	Leixões	Coimbra
11:15 WET (UTC+01:00)	Brendon 48'; Djoussé 48'	Report	Pedro Henrique 48'	Stadium: Estádio Cidade de Coimbra; Attendance: 2,522; Referee: Carlos Xistra

4 January 2019 15	Académica	3–0	Cova da Piedade	Coimbra
20:30 WET (UTC+01:00)	Hugo Almeida 22'; Júnior 55'; Traquina (yellow card) 64'; Ricardo Guimarães (yellow card) 69'; Romário Baldé 70'	Summary	Thabo Cele (yellow card) 31'; Sori Mané (yellow card) 57'; Hugo Firmino (yellow card) 68'; Rafael Amorim (yellow card) 70' (yellow-red card) 71'	Stadium: Estádio Cidade de Coimbra; Attendance: 2,788; Referee: Vitor Ferreira

13 January 2019 17	Académica	2–0	Varzim	Coimbra
17:00 WET (UTC+01:00)	Yuri 17'; Hugo Almeida 74'	Report		Stadium: Estádio Cidade de Coimbra; Attendance: Fábio Melo; Referee: 3,246

20 January 2019 18	Académica	1–0	Oliveirense	Coimbra
17:00 WET (UTC+01:00)	Djoussé 74'	Report		Stadium: Estádio Cidade de Coimbra; Attendance: 3,449; Referee: António Nobre

28 January 2019 19	Paços de Ferreira	2–0	Académica	Paços de Ferreira
17:00 WET (UTC+01:00)	Uilton 31'; Fatai 79'	Report		Stadium: Estádio da Mata Real; Attendance: 1,110; Referee: João Matos

2 February 2019 20	Académica	1–1	Vitória Guimarães B	Coimbra
17:00 WET (UTC+01:00)	João Real 10'	Report	Aziz (74 p)	Stadium: Estádio Cidade de Coimbra; Attendance: 2,643; Referee: Gustavo Correia

9 February 2019 21	Benfica B	0–1	Académica	Seixal
17:00 WET (UTC+01:00)		Report	Jonathan Toro 77'	Stadium: Caixa Futebol Campus; Attendance: 908; Referee: Pedro Vilaça

17 February 2019 22	Académica	1–0	Farense	Coimbra
15:00 WET (UTC+01:00)	Hugo Almeida 86'	Report		Stadium: Estádio Cidade de Coimbra; Attendance: 3,240; Referee: João Capela

24 February 2019 23	Estoril	1–0	Académica	Estoril
20:00 WET (UTC+01:00)	Gorré 48'	Report		Stadium: Estádio António Coimbra da Mota; Attendance: 1,683; Referee: Rui Costa

2 March 2019 24	Académica	2–1	Penafiel	Coimbra
17:00 WET (UTC+01:00)	Jonathan Toro 63'; Yuri 85'	Report	Fábio Abreu 76'	Stadium: Estádio Cidade de Coimbra; Attendance: 2,622; Referee: André Narciso

10 March 2019 25	Académico de Viseu	1–2	Académica	Viseu
17:00 WET (UTC+01:00)	Ferreira 69'	Report	João Real 16'; Reko 47'	Stadium: Estádio do Fontelo; Attendance: 1,225; Referee: António Nobre

16 March 2019 26	Académica	1–0	Braga B	Coimbra
11:00 WET (UTC+01:00)	Hugo Almeida 55'	Report		Stadium: Estádio Cidade de Coimbra; Attendance: 2,479; Referee: Fábio Melo

31 March 2019 27	Arouca	2–1	Académica	Arouca
18:00 WET (UTC+01:00)	Toni 40'; Fábio Fortes 85'	Report	Júnior 50'	Stadium: Estádio Municipal de Arouca; Attendance: 1,370; Referee: José Rodrigues

6 April 2019 28	Académica	4–1	Porto B	Coimbra
11:00 WET (UTC+01:00)	Júnior 4', 79'; Hugo Almeida 61', 90+2'	Report	Rui Costa 39'	Stadium: Estádio Cidade de Coimbra; Attendance: 2,283; Referee: Gustavo Correia

13 April 2019 29	Famalicão	2–0	Académica	Vila Nova de Famalicão
11:00 WET (UTC+01:00)	Rocha 7'; Walterson 63'	Report		Stadium: Estádio Municipal 22 de Junho; Attendance: 4,922; Referee: Tiago Martins

20 April 2019 30	Académica	0–0	Mafra	Coimbra
18:00 WET (UTC+01:00)		Report		Stadium: Estádio Cidade de Coimbra; Attendance: 2,014; Referee: José Rodrigues

27 April 2019 31	Leixões	1–1	Académica	Matosinhos
11:00 WET (UTC+01:00)	Derick 35'	Report	Fernando Alexandre 48'	Stadium: Estádio do Mar; Attendance: 826; Referee: João Malheiro Pinto

4 May 2019 32	Cova da Piedade	2–0	Académica	Cova da Piedade
16:00 WET (UTC+01:00)	Miguel Rosa 24'; Cele 90+2'	Report		Stadium: Estádio Municipal José Martins Vieira; Attendance: 1,290; Referee: Fábio Melo

12 May 2019 33	Académica	0–2	Sporting Covilhã	Coimbra
16:00 WET (UTC+01:00)		Report	Mica 34'; Kukula 45'	Stadium: Estádio Cidade de Coimbra; Attendance: 1,546; Referee: Gustavo Correia

19 May 2019 34	Varzim	1–0	Académica	Póvoa de Varzim
15:00 WET (UTC+01:00)	Júlio Alves 75'	Report		Stadium: Estádio do Varzim SC; Attendance: 5,899; Referee: Manuel Mota

=== Taça de Portugal ===
==== Second round ====
30 September 2018	Pedras Salgadas	1–0	Académica	Pedras Salgadas
15:00 WEST (UTC+01:00)	Carlos Mendes 2'			Stadium: Estádio da Portelinha; Referee: Marco Cruz

=== Taça da Liga ===
==== First round ====
22 July 2018	Académica	0–0 (3–4 p)	Leixões	Coimbra
19:45 WEST (UTC+01:00)		Report		Stadium: Estádio Cidade de Coimbra; Attendance: 1,812; Referee: Vítor Ferreira

== Players ==
=== Appearances and goals ===
As of match played on 19 May 2019

No.	Pos.	Nat.	Player	Primeira Liga			Taça de Portugal			Taça da Liga			Total		
1	GK	(Brazil)	Peçanha	20	0	-17	1	0	-1	1	0	0	22	0	-18
3	DF	(Brazil)	William Soares	3	0	0	0	0	0	1	0	0	4	0	0
4	DF	(Portugal)	Hugo Ribeiro	0	0	0	0	0	0	0	0	0	0	0	0
5	DF	(Portugal)	Joel Ferreira	18	0	0	1	0	0	0	0	0	19	0	0
6	MF	(Portugal)	Ricardo Dias	25	1	0	0	0	0	1	0	0	26	1	0
7	FW	(Portugal)	Marinho	3	19	2	0	0	0	1	0	0	4	19	2
8	MF	(South Korea)	Hwang Mun-ki	6	3	0	0	0	0	1	0	0	7	3	0
9	FW	(Portugal)	Hugo Almeida	14	9	10	0	0	0	0	0	0	14	9	10
10	FW	(Honduras)	Jonathan Toro	11	1	2	0	0	0	0	0	0	11	1	2
11	FW	(Cape Verde)	Júnior Monteiro	20	4	6	1	0	0	0	0	0	21	4	6
12	MF	(Portugal)	Rúben Saldanha	4	7	0	0	1	0	0	0	0	4	8	0
13	DF	(Portugal)	João Real	12	2	2	0	0	0	0	0	0	12	2	2
17	FW	(Guinea-Bissau)	Romário Baldé	29	1	2	1	0	0	0	0	0	30	1	2
18	DF	(Portugal)	Nuno Esgueirão	0	0	0	0	0	0	0	0	0	0	0	0
19	DF	(Portugal)	Nélson Pedroso	8	0	0	0	0	0	1	0	0	9	0	0
20	FW	(Portugal)	João Traquina	19	5	0	1	0	0	1	0	0	21	5	0
21	MF	(Portugal)	Guima	16	2	0	0	0	0	0	1	0	16	3	0
22	DF	(Brazil)	Jean Felipe	19	3	0	1	0	0	0	0	0	20	3	0
23	DF	(Portugal)	Mike Moura	17	2	0	0	0	0	1	0	0	18	2	0
28	MF	(Portugal)	Reko	21	6	2	1	0	0	1	0	0	23	6	2
30	MF	(Portugal)	David Teles	1	0	0	1	0	0	0	0	0	1	1	0
31	FW	(Nigeria)	Femi Balogun	2	3	0	0	0	0	0	0	0	2	3	0
39	FW	(Cameroon)	Donald Djoussé	15	11	5	1	0	0	1	0	0	17	11	5
41	GK	(Portugal)	Ricardo Moura	12	1	-15	0	0	0	0	0	0	12	1	-15
43	DF	(Brazil)	Brendon	18	3	2	1	0	0	0	0	0	19	3	2
44	DF	(Brazil)	Yuri Matias	27	0	2	1	0	0	0	0	0	28	0	2
65	MF	(Portugal)	Fernando Alexandre	9	6	1	0	0	0	1	0	0	10	6	1
66	FW	(Portugal)	Diogo Ribeiro	1	4	0	0	1	0	0	1	0	1	6	0
77	FW	(Portugal)	Rodrigo Vilela	0	1	0	0	0	0	0	0	0	0	1	0
83	DF	(Portugal)	Zé Castro	20	1	0	0	0	0	0	0	0	20	1	0
90	GK	(Portugal)	Júlio Neiva	2	2	-4	0	0	0	0	0	0	2	2	-4
Players transferred out during the season
10	MF	(Brazil)	Zé Paulo	2	3	0	1	0	0	0	1	0	3	4	0

Source: Equipa

=== Transfers ===
==== Summer ====
In: (Note: Please note that this table only shows those players released or sold who were part of the first team.)

Date	Position	Player	From	Fee	Ref
15 June 2018	MF	(Portugal) Ricardo Dias	(Portugal) Belenenses	Loan extended	
21 June 2018	MF	(Portugal) Reko	(Portugal) Gil Vicente	Free Transfer	
22 June 2018	MF	(Brazil) Zé Paulo	(Portugal) Académico Viseu	Free Transfer	
27 June 2018	GK	(Brazil) Peçanha	(Portugal) Académico Viseu	Free Transfer	
28 June 2018	GK	(Portugal) Júlio Neiva	(Portugal) Gil Vicente	Free Transfer	
2 July 2018	DF	(Brazil) William Soares	(Cyprus) Omonia	Free Transfer	
2 July 2018	FW	(Cameroon) Donald Djoussé	(Portugal) Marítimo	Free Transfer	
12 July 2018	DF	(Portugal) Joel Ferreira	(Portugal) Estoril	Free Transfer	
16 July 2018	MF	(Portugal) Guima	(Portugal) Sporting CP	Loan Extended	
16 July 2018	FW	(Portugal) Hugo Almeida	(Croatia) Hajduk Split	Free Transfer	
12 August 2018	GK	(Portugal) Ricardo Moura	(Portugal) Tondela	Free Transfer	
14 August 2018	FW	(Cape Verde) Júnior Monteiro	(Portugal) União da Madeira	Free Transfer	
27 August 2018	MF	(Portugal) Rúben Saldanha	(Portugal) Santa Clara	Free Transfer	
31 August 2018	MF	(Brazil) Jean Felipe	(Portugal) Portimonense	1-year loan	
31 August 2018	FW	(Guinea-Bissau) Romário Baldé	(Poland) Lechia Gdańsk	1-year loan	

Out: (Note: Please note that this table only shows those players released or sold who were part of the first team.)

Date	Position	Player	To	Fee	Ref
28 May 2018	MF	(Portugal) Chiquinho	(Portugal) Benfica	€600k	
1 June 2018	FW	(Brazil) Alan Júnior	(Portugal) Benfica	Loan ended	
1 June 2018	FW	(Nigeria) Femi Balogun	(Portugal) Belenenses	Loan ended	
1 June 2018	MF	(Portugal) Guima	(Portugal) Sporting	Loan ended	
1 June 2018	DF	(Portugal) Pedro Coronas	(Portugal) Marítimo	Loan ended	
1 June 2018	DF	(Portugal) Pedro Empis	(Portugal) Sporting	Loan ended	
1 June 2018	MF	(Guinea-Bissau) Piqueti	(Portugal) Marítimo	Loan ended	
1 June 2018	GK	(Portugal) Guilherme Oliveira	(Portugal) Belenenses	Released	(Note: Guilherme Oliveira joined Belenenses following his release.)
1 June 2018	GK	(Portugal) João Gomes	(Portugal) Alcains	Released	(Note: João Gomes joined Alcains following his release.)
1 June 2018	GK	(Portugal) Ricardo Ribeiro	(Portugal) Paços de Ferreira	Released	(Note: Ricardo Ribeiro joined Paços de Ferreira following his release.)
1 June 2018	MF	(Portugal) Zé Tiago	(Portugal) Mafra	Released	(Note: Zé Tiago joined Mafra following his release.)
1 June 2018	FW	(Portugal) Leandro Cardoso	(Portugal) Marítimo	Released	(Note: Leandro Cardoso joined Marítimo following his release.)
1 June 2018	FW	(Portugal) Luisinho	(Portugal) Académico Viseu	Released	(Note: Luisinho joined Académico Viseu following his release.)
1 June 2018	FW	(Portugal) Tozé Marreco	(Portugal) Lusitânia	Released	(Note: Tozé Marreco joined Lusitânia following his release.)

==== Winter ====
In:

Date	Position	Player	From	Fee	Ref
31 January 2019	FW	(Nigeria) Femi Balogun	(Turkey) Gaziantep FK	Free	
31 January 2019	FW	(Honduras) Jonathan Toro	(Spain) Huesca	6-month loan	

Out:

Date	Position	Player	To	Fee	Ref
15 December 2018	MF	(São Tomé and Príncipe) Zé Paulo	(Portugal) Leixões	Free	(Note: Zé Paulo joined Leixões following his release.)

== Coaching staff ==
Position	Staff
Coach	(Portugal) João Alves
Assistant Coach	(Portugal) Tó Sá
Assistant Coach	(Portugal) João Gião
Fitness Coach	(Portugal) Vítor Vinha
Goalkeeping Coach	(Portugal) Vítor Alves

Last updated: 10 October 2018
Source: Equipa Técnica
