= Troféu Crédito Agrícola =

- Founded: 2015
- Teams: 2
- Current champions: Académica

The Troféu Crédito Agrícola is an annual football tournament held at the Estádio Cidade de Coimbra in Coimbra, Portugal.

== Matches ==
=== 2015 ===
4 August 2015
20:00 WEST

Académica (Portugal)	2–2 (a.e.t.)	(Morocco) Wydad Casablanca
Rabiola 20' (pen.); Rui Pedro 43' (pen.)		El-Moutaraji 16'; Diarra 66' (pen.)
Penalties
	4–2

Estádio Cidade de Coimbra, Coimbra

=== 2016 ===
20 July 2016
20:00 WEST

Académica (Portugal)	0–0 (a.e.t.)	(Portugal) Feirense
Penalties
Ki (penalty scored); Taborda (penalty missed); Vidigal (penalty scored); Nii Plange (penalty scored); Pedro Nuno (penalty missed)	3–4	(penalty missed) Paulo Monteiro; (penalty scored) Platiny; (penalty scored) Fabinho; (penalty scored) Barge; (penalty scored) Vieirinha

Estádio Cidade de Coimbra, Coimbra
Attendance: 2,409

=== 2017 ===
18 July 2017
21:00 WEST

Académica (Portugal)	1–1 (a.e.t.)	(Portugal) Tondela
Ki 30'		Murilo 85'
Penalties
D. Ribeiro (penalty missed); Pedroso (penalty scored); Brendon (penalty scored); Djoussé (penalty scored); R. Ribeiro (penalty scored); Luisinho (penalty missed)	4–5	(penalty scored) R. Costa; (penalty scored) D. Bruno; (penalty scored) Murilo; (penalty scored) Pité; (penalty missed) J. Vasco; (penalty scored) Boyd

Estádio Cidade de Coimbra, Coimbra

=== 2018 ===
17 July 2018
21:00 WEST

Académica (Portugal)	0–0 (a.e.t.)	(Portugal) Belenenses
Penalties
Zé Paulo (penalty missed); Ki (penalty missed); Joel (penalty scored); Fernando Alexandre (penalty missed)	3–4	(penalty scored) Sagna; (penalty missed) Cleylton; (penalty scored) Tiago; (penalty scored) Kikas

Estádio Cidade de Coimbra, Coimbra
Attendance: 2,534

=== 2019 ===
23 July 2019
21:00 WEST

Académica (Portugal)	2–0	(Portugal) União de Leiria
Reko 49'; Dany 56'

Estádio Cidade de Coimbra, Coimbra
Attendance: 2,619

== Performance by team ==
Team	Winners	Runners-up
(Portugal) Académica	2	3
(Portugal) Belenenses	1	—
(Portugal) Feirense	1	—
(Portugal) Tondela	1	—
(Portugal) União de Leiria	—	1
(Morocco) Wydad Casablanca	—	1
