= Abalo =

Abalo is a Galician surname. Notable people with the surname include:

- Améleté Abalo (1962–2010), Togolese football coach
- Blaise Kilizou Abalo (1947–2013), Togolese director, producer, and screenwriter
- Dani Abalo (born 1987), Spanish professional footballer
- Jean-Paul Abalo (born 1975), Togolese football player
- José María Abalo (1884–1954), Spanish football pioneer
- Luc Abalo (born 1984), French handball player
- Manuel Jiménez Abalo (born 1956), Spanish football player
- María Laura Abalo (born 1981), Argentine rower
- Sunday Abalo (born 1995), Nigerian footballer

== See also ==
- Abalos
