= Pedro Pinto =

Pedro Pinto may refer to:

- Pedro Pinto (journalist) (born 1975), Portuguese-American journalist
- Pedro Pinto (politician) (born 1977), Portuguese politician
- Pedro Pinto (footballer, born 1951), Chilean footballer
- Pedro Pinto (footballer, born 1994), Portuguese footballer
- Pedro Pinto (footballer, born 2000), Portuguese footballer
- Pedro Pinto Rubianes (born 1931), Ecuadorian politician
