= Cecilia Echenique =

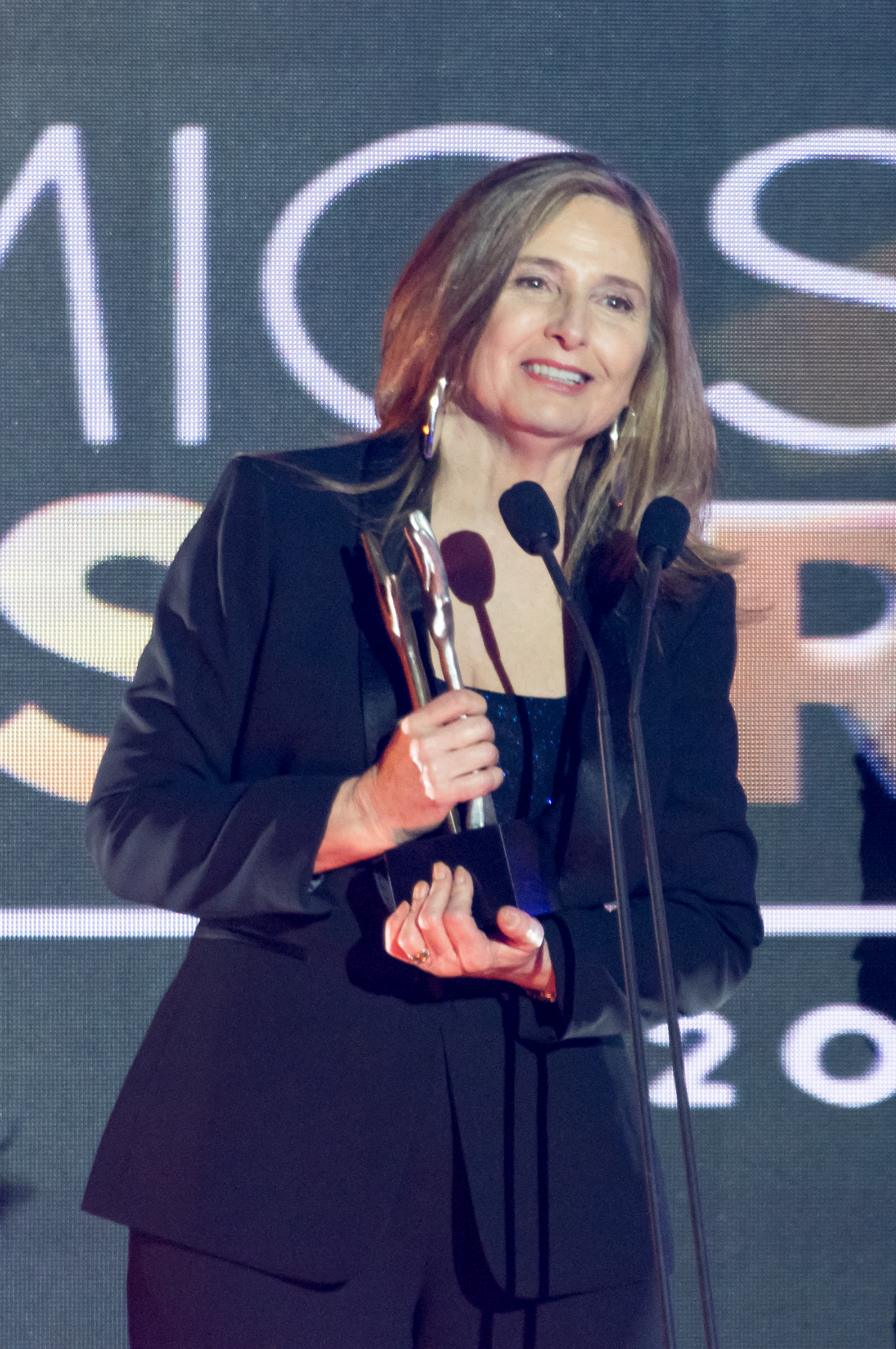

Background information
- Born: Cecilia Echenique
- Origin: Santiago, Chile
- Genres: Latin pop
- Occupations: Singer, composer, tv presenter
- Instrument: Vocals
- Years active: 1980–present
- Website: http://www.ceciliaechenique.cl/

Cecilia Echenique (October 28, 1957) is a Chilean singer-songwriter.

Among Chilean musicians, she is one of the most versatile and thus remains vigent in the current Chilean musical landscape. She studied at the "Instituto de Música" de la Pontificia Universidad Católica de Chile". She is most known for having been part of the children's music group "Mazapan" for 10 years. More recently, she was vocal coach for the "La Paz" team in the Chilean TV show Todos a Coro, hosted by Rafael Araneda and Karen Doggenweiler. She and her chorus obtained the third place.

== Biography ==
In 1980, the singer had her musical debut with the children's music group Mazapán, with whom she recorded multiple albums and hosted a TV program in Canal 11 and later in Televisión Nacional de Chile. Meanwhile, she also pursued her interest for her own generation's music: Canto Nuevo. Along with Eduardo Peralta, she inaugurated Café del Cerro, a key location in the development of the musical movement.

In 1982, Echenique traveled to the United States, where she formed a baroque music group at Princeton University. In 1986, she returned to Chile, to join Eduardo Gatti in a series of concerts at the Teatro Providencia. The following year, Echenique collaborated on the Voces album, recorded to welcome Pope John Paul II in his visit to Chile. Her song, a duet version of "La cigarra" with Leon Gieco, was the first single on the album.

In 1987, Echenique recorded her first album as a solo act, Tiempo Fecundo, which included covers of "Todo cambia" and "Yolanda", which was well received. In 1989, she released her second solo album, En Silencio, in which she performed original compositions.

== Personal life ==
On March 22, 1980, she married democrat ex senator Ignacio Walker. They have three children together: Elisa (lawyer), Ignacio (filmmaker), and Benjamín (singer-songwriter).

== Discography ==
- Tiempo Fecundo – Sony (1987)
- En Silencio – CBS (1989)
- Me Pregunto – Sony (1992)
- El Amor Existe Aún – Polygram (1995)
- Debajo de mi Piel – Polygram (1997)
- Villancicos – Polygram (1998)
- Chilena – Polygram (1999)
- Secreta Intimidad – Universal (2001)
- Brasil Amado – Universal (2002)
- Villancicos Vol. 2 – Fondo Producción SCD (2004)
- Antología – Sony (2004)
- Hoy como Ayer, con Eduardo Peralta – Bco. del Estado (2005)
- DVD Villancicos – Universal (2005)
- Tonadas Chilenas, con Mario Rojas – Chile Profundo (2007)
- Pequeñas Historias CD/DVD – Oveja negra (2007)
- Lo que hoy necesito – Oveja negra (2011)
