= List of Portuguese football transfers winter 2015–16 =

This is a list of Portuguese winter football transfers for the 2015–16 season. The winter transfer window opened on 1 January 2016 and closed on 31 January 2016. Players could be bought before the transfer window opened, but could not join their new clubs until 1 January. Additionally, players without a club could join at any time and clubs were able to sign a goalkeeper on an emergency loan if they had no registered goalkeeper available. Only moves involving Primeira Liga clubs are listed. This list includes transfers featuring Primeira Liga clubs which completed transfers after the closing of the summer 2015 transfer window due to other domestic leagues having a later closure date to their transfer window.

== Transfers ==
Date	Name	Moving from	Moving to	Fee
1 September 2015	(Portugal) Zequinha	Unattached	(Portugal) Arouca	Free
1 September 2015	(Netherlands) Ola John	(Portugal) Benfica	(England) Reading	Loan
1 September 2015	(Brazil) Sidnei	(Portugal) Benfica	(Spain) Deportivo La Coruña	Loan
4 September 2015	(Portugal) Nélson Oliveira	(Portugal) Benfica	(England) Nottingham Forest	Loan
14 November 2015	(Brazil) Bruno César	(Portugal) Estoril	(Portugal) Sporting CP	Undisclosed
20 November 2015	(Italy) Ezequiel Schelotto	(Italy) Inter Milan	(Portugal) Sporting CP	Undisclosed
17 December 2015	(Brazil) Michael	(Brazil) Fluminense	(Portugal) Estoril Praia	Loan
20 December 2015	(Angola) Mateus	(Angola) Primeiro de Agosto	(Portugal) Arouca	Undisclosed
22 December 2015	(Portugal) Luís Gustavo	(Portugal) Rio Ave	(Spain) Celta Vigo B	Undisclosed
22 December 2015	(Norway) Stian Ringstad	(Norway) Lillestrøm	(Portugal) Braga	Undisclosed
27 December 2015	(Netherlands) Marvin Zeegelaar	(Portugal) Rio Ave	(Portugal) Sporting CP	€0.4m
29 December 2015	(Spain) Álex Grimaldo	(Spain) Barcelona B	(Portugal) Benfica	€1.5m
29 December 2015	(Brazil) Kanu	(Portugal) Vitória de Guimarães	(Belgium) OH Leuven	Undisclosed
31 December 2015	(Brazil) Walter	(Portugal) Porto	(Brazil) Atlético Paranaense	Undisclosed
8 January 2016	(Italy) Bryan Cristante	(Portugal) Benfica	(Italy) Palermo	Loan
8 January 2016	(Brazil) Marion	(Brazil) Atlético Mineiro	(Portugal) Estoril Praia	Loan
8 January 2016	(Italy) Dani Osvaldo	(Portugal) Porto	(Argentina) Boca Juniors	Free
8 January 2016	(France) Damien Plessis	(France) Châteauroux	(Portugal) Marítimo	Undisclosed
8 January 2016	(Paraguay) Jorge Rojas	(Portugal) Benfica	(Paraguay) Cerro Porteño	Loan
12 January 2016	(Serbia) Ivan Šaponjić	(Serbia) Partizan	(Portugal) Benfica	Undisclosed
14 January 2016	(Portugal) Fábio Espinho	(Spain) Málaga	(Portugal) Moreirense	Loan
14 January 2016	(South Korea) Suk Hyun-jun	(Portugal) Vitória de Setúbal	(Portugal) Porto	Undisclosed
15 January 2016	(Spain) Juanto	(Spain) Llagostera	(Portugal) Belenenses	Free
16 January 2016	(Nigeria) Sunday Abalo	(Portugal) Rio Ave	(Portugal) Leixões	Loan
16 January 2016	(Portugal) Rafa	(Portugal) Porto B	(Portugal) Académica de Coimbra	Loan
18 January 2016	(Montenegro) Marko Bakić	(Italy) Fiorentina	(Portugal) Belenenses	Loan
18 January 2016	(Brazil) Rodrigo Pinho	(Portugal) Braga	(Portugal) Nacional	Loan
18 January 2016	(Spain) Joan Román	(Portugal) Braga	(Portugal) Nacional	Loan
20 January 2016	(Brazil) Lucas Farias	(Brazil) São Paulo	(Portugal) Estoril Praia	Loan
20 January 2016	(Colombia) Erik Moreno	(Portugal) Braga	(Portugal) Tondela	Loan
20 January 2016	(Spain) Eñaut Zubikarai	(Spain) Real Sociedad	(Portugal) Tondela	Undisclosed
22 January 2016	(Iran) Alireza Haghighi	Unattached	(Portugal) Marítimo	Free
22 January 2016	(Chile) Igor Lichnovsky	(Portugal) Porto	(Spain) Sporting de Gijón	Loan
25 January 2016	(Serbia) Filip Đuričić	(Portugal) Benfica	(Belgium) Anderlecht	Loan
25 January 2016	(Cameroon) Albert Meyong	(Angola) Kabuscorp	(Portugal) Vitória de Setúbal	Undisclosed
25 January 2016	(Portugal) José Sá	(Portugal) Marítimo	(Portugal) Porto	Undisclosed
25 January 2016	(Mali) Moussa Marega	(Portugal) Marítimo	(Portugal) Porto	Undisclosed
26 January 2016	(Brazil) Marcelo Boeck	(Portugal) Sporting CP	(Brazil) Chapecoense	Undisclosed
26 January 2016	(Portugal) Josué	(Portugal) Porto	(Portugal) Braga	Loan
27 January 2016	(Portugal) Tomané	(Portugal) Vitória de Guimarães	(Germany) MSV Duisburg	Undisclosed
28 January 2016	(Uruguay) Sebastián Coates	(England) Sunderland	(Portugal) Sporting CP	Loan
28 January 2016	(Peru) Paolo Hurtado	(England) Reading	(Portugal) Vitória de Guimarães	Loan
28 January 2016	(Poland) Maciej Makuszewski	(Poland) Lechia Gdańsk	(Portugal) Vitória de Setúbal	Undisclosed
29 January 2016	(Portugal) João Silva	(Portugal) Paços de Ferreira	(Italy) Avellino	Undisclosed
30 January 2016	(Spain) Oriol Rosell	(Portugal) Sporting CP	(Portugal) Vitória de Guimarães	Loan
1 February 2016	(France) Giannelli Imbula	(Portugal) Porto	(England) Stoke City	€24m
1 February 2016	(Morocco) Zakaria Labyad	(Portugal) Sporting CP	(England) Fulham	Loan
1 February 2016	(United States) Erik Palmer-Brown	(United States) Sporting Kansas City	(Portugal) Porto	Loan
4 February 2016	(Brazil) Kelvin	(Portugal) Porto	(Brazil) São Paulo	Loan
10 February 2016	(Mexico) Raúl Gudiño	(Portugal) Porto	(Portugal) União de Madeira	Loan
14 February 2016	(Brazil) Maicon	(Portugal) Porto	(Brazil) São Paulo	Loan

- ^1 Some players may have been bought after the end of the 2015 summer transfer window in Portugal but before the end of that country's transfer window closed.
