= Daniel Costa =

Daniel Costa may refer to:

- Daniel Costa (Brazilian footballer) (born 1988), football defender
- Daniel Costa (Portuguese footballer) (born 2000), football forward
- Daniel Costa Teixeira de Souza, stage name Daniel Satti, Brazilian actor
- Danny da Costa (born 1993), German footballer
