= 2018–19 Under 20 Elite League =

European Elite League

Tournament details
- Dates: August 2018 – March 2019
- Teams: 8 (from 8 associations)

Final positions
- Champions: Netherlands (1st title)
- Runners-up: Portugal
- Third place: Germany
- Fourth place: England

Tournament statistics
- Matches played: 28
- Goals scored: 82 (2.93 per match)
- Top scorer(s): (Italy) Gianluca Scamacca (5 goals)

The 2018–19 Under 20 Elite League (sometimes referred to as the European Elite League) was an age-restricted association football tournament for national Under-20 teams. It was the second edition of the Under 20 Elite League.

== Participating teams ==
- Czech Republic
- England
- Germany
- Italy
- Netherlands
- Poland
- Portugal
- Switzerland

== League table ==
Pos	Team	Pld	W	D	L	GF	GA	GD	Pts
1	Netherlands (C)	7	5	2	0	16	6	+10	17
2	Portugal	7	4	2	1	10	5	+5	14
3	Germany	7	4	2	1	13	10	+3	14
4	England	7	3	1	3	9	9	0	10
5	Switzerland	7	2	1	4	9	11	−2	7
6	Czech Republic	7	2	1	4	8	14	−6	7
7	Poland	7	2	0	5	7	13	−6	6
8	Italy	7	1	1	5	10	14	−4	4

Source: Standings
(C) Champions

== Results ==
6 September 2018

England	2–0	Switzerland
Hirst 4'; Embleton 60'	Report

St George's Park National Football Centre, Burton (England)

6 September 2018

Portugal	0–0	Netherlands
	Report

Estádio António Coimbra da Mota, Estorial (Portugal)
Referee: Christof Günsch (Germany)

6 September 2018

Poland	0–3	Italy
	Report	Kean 5', 67'; Scamacca 38'

Stadion Widzewa, Łódź (Poland)
Referee: Ondřej Berka (Czech Republic)

7 September 2018

Germany	3–2	Czech Republic
Özcan 41'; Itter 62'; Daferner 65'	Report	Sasinka 18'; Žitný 46'

Waldstadion an der Kaiserlinde, Spiesen-Elversberg (Germany)
Referee: Tomasz Wajda (Poland)

10 September 2018

Switzerland	1–0	Poland
Zeqiri 53'	Report

Stade de Chailly, Montreux (Switzerland)

10 September 2018

Netherlands	3–1	England
Chong 62'; Vente 75'; Kadioglu 88'	Report	Nketiah 6'

Nieuw Zuid, Katwijk (Netherlands)
Referee: Lukas Fähndrich (Switzerland)

11 September 2018

Czech Republic	2–4	Portugal
Žitný 36'; Havelka 49'	Report	Santos 4'; Correia 9', 55'; Neto 50'

Na Litavce, Příbram (Czech Republic)
Referee: Jochem Kamphuis (Netherlands)

11 October 2018

England	2–1	Italy
Nketiah 20'; Willock 39' (pen.)		Frattesi 65'

Mill Farm, Wesham (England)
Attendance: 3,817
Referee: Allard Lindhout (Netherlands)

11 October 2018

Poland	3–0	Czech Republic
Puchacz 8'; Łyszczarz 11' (pen.); Moder 16' (pen.)

Stadion Widzewa, Lodz (Poland)
Referee: David Schärli (Switzerland)

11 October 2018

Portugal	1–1	Switzerland
Gomes 72'		Pusic 57'

Complexo Desportivo de Rio Maior, Rio Maior (Portugal)
Referee: Darren England (England)

12 October 2018

Germany	1–1	Netherlands
Baak 21'		Sierhuis 23'

Hänsch-Arena, Meppen (Germany)
Referee: Rosario Abisso (Italy)

15 October 2018

Czech Republic	1–1	England
Pfeifer 86'		Nketiah 39'

Stadion Střelecký ostrov, České Budějovice (Czech Republic)
Attendance: 2,795

16 October 2018

Italy	1–2	Portugal
Scamacca 65'		Correia 36'; Quina 65'

Stadio Ezio Scida, Crotone, Italy
Referee: Wojciech Myc (Poland)

16 October 2018

Netherlands	4–1	Poland
Vente 14'; De Wit 25', 35', 44'		Benedyczak 71'

Nieuw Zuid, Katwijk, Netherlands
Referee: Luís Godinho (Portugal)

16 October 2018

Germany	3–2	Switzerland
Hack 10'; Beste 16'; Muslija 20'		Pusic 33', 48'

Ostfriesland-Stadion, Emden, Germany
Referee: Ondrej Pechanec (Czech Republic)

15 November 2018

Switzerland	1–3	Netherlands
Kasai 48'		Gakpo 35', 39', 70'

Esp Stadium, Fislisbach, Switzerland

15 November 2018

Italy	3–3	Germany
Frattesi 11'; Scamacca 48'; Pinamonti 83'		Gurleyen 36'; Otto 39'; Czyborra 52'

Stadio Enzo Ricci, Sassuolo, Italy
Referee: Jeroen Manschot (Netherlands)

15 November 2018

Portugal	2–0	Poland
Balde 30'; Cardoso 85'

Estádio Algarve, São João da Venda, Portugal
Referee: Fabrizio Pasqua (Italy)

19 November 2018

Czech Republic	2–1	Switzerland
Sasinka 4', 7'		Zumberi 89'

Městský fotbalový stadion Srbská, Brno, Czech Republic

19 November 2018

England	2–0	Germany
Willock 66'; Nmecha 69'

Colchester Community Stadium, Colchester, England
Attendance: 7,648
Referee: Pawel Pskit (Poland)

20 November 2018

Netherlands	3–2	Italy
Vente 19'; Gakpo 28'; Lang 89'		Scamacca 11', 61'

Nieuw Zuid Katwijk, Katwijk, Netherlands
Referee: Robert Jones (England)

21 March 2019

Italy	0–1	Czech Republic
		Růsek 22'

Stadio Carlo Speroni, Busto Arsizio, Italy
Referee: Nicolas Jancevski (Switzerland)

21 March 2019

England	1–3	Poland
Nketiah 57'		Moder 8'; Klimala 26' (pen.); Kwietniewski 53'

St George’s Park, Burton, England

22 March 2019

Germany	1–0	Portugal
Burnić 21'

BWT-Stadion am Hardtwald, Sandhausen, Germany
Referee: Jochem Kamphuis (Netherlands)

24 March 2019

Czech Republic	0–2	Netherlands
		Grot 11'; Vente 19'

Referee: Piotr Urban (Poland)

24 March 2019

Switzerland	3–0	Italy
Cömert 11' (pen.); Vargas 38'; Pusic 49'

Stadion Kleinfeld, Kriens, Switzerland
Attendance: 3,024

25 March 2019

Poland	0–2	Germany
		Otto 17'; Friede 78'

Stadion Miejski, Bielsko-Biała, Poland
Attendance: 6,348
Referee: Rosario Abisso (Italy)

25 March 2019

Portugal	1–0	England
Martelo 62'

Estádio Municipal 25 de Abril, Penafiel, Portugal
Referee: Florian Badstubner (Germany)
