= Silvério Silva =

Portuguese footballer (born 1995)

Silvério
Personal information
- Full name: Silvério Júnio Gonçalves Silva
- Date of birth: 26 December 1995 (age 30)
- Place of birth: Vila do Conde, Portugal
- Height: 1.86 m (6 ft 1 in)
- Position: Centre-back

Team information
- Current team: Lusitânia
- Number: 5

Youth career
- 2007–2014: Rio Ave

Senior career*
Years	Team	Apps	(Gls)
2014–2019	Rio Ave	0	(0)
2014–2016	→ Famalicão (loan)	30	(3)
2016–2017	→ Leixões (loan)	24	(0)
2018–2019	→ Varzim (loan)	24	(2)
2019–2021	Académica	44	(3)
2021–2023	Penafiel	29	(0)
2023–2024	Borneo Samarinda	33	(2)
2024–	Lusitânia	32	(1)
- * Club domestic league appearances and goals as of 20 June 2026

Silvério Júnio Gonçalves Silva (born 26 December 1995), simply known as Silvério, is a Portuguese professional footballer who plays as a centre-back for Liga Portugal 2 club Lusitânia.

== Football career ==
Born in Vila do Conde, Silvério spent his entire youth career at hometown club Rio Ave F.C. and was an unused substitute for a handful of Primeira Liga games, but never made a senior appearance. In January 2014, he and fellow local Nélson Monte signed five-year professional contracts.

In August 2014, Silvério was loaned to third-tier club F.C. Famalicão, which was renewed a year later after the club won promotion. On 16 September 2015, he made his professional debut in a 2–2 draw at U.D. Oliveirense.

In July 2016, Silvério and Rio Ave teammate Sunday Abalo were loaned to Leixões S.C. for the upcoming second division campaign. Two years later, on the final day of business, he was loaned to neighbours Varzim S.C. at the same level.

Silvério left Rio Ave on 1 July 2019 for Académica de Coimbra, signed by his former Varzim boss César Peixoto. Two years later, he moved to F.C. Penafiel.

== Honours ==
=== Individual ===
- APPI Indonesian Football Award Best XI: 2023–24
