= List of Portuguese football transfers summer 2015 =

This is a list of Portuguese football transfers for the summer of 2015. The summer transfer window will open 1 July and close at midnight on 1 September. Players may be bought before the transfer windows opens, but may only join their new club on 1 July. Only moves involving Primeira Liga clubs are listed. Additionally, players without a club may join a club at any time.

== Transfers ==
Date	Name	Moving from	Moving to	Fee
31 January 2015	(Portugal) André Simões	(Portugal) Moreirense	(Greece) AEK Athens	Undisclosed
6 February 2015	(Angola) Edi Valentim	(Portugal) Bragança	(Portugal) Boavista	Free
25 February 2015	(New Zealand) Tyler Boyd	(New Zealand) Wellington Phoenix	(Portugal) Vitória de Guimarães	Undisclosed
2 March 2015	(Portugal) André André	(Portugal) Vitória de Guimarães	(Portugal) Porto	€1,500,000
31 March 2015	(Brazil) Danilo	(Portugal) Porto	(Spain) Real Madrid	€31,500,000
20 May 2015	(Venezuela) Jhon Murillo	(Venezuela) Zamora	(Portugal) Benfica	Undisclosed
25 May 2015	(Portugal) João Cancelo	(Portugal) Benfica	(Spain) Valencia	Undisclosed
25 May 2015	(Ghana) Emmanuel Hackman	(Portugal) Vila Real	(Portugal) Boavista	Free
25 May 2015	(Democratic Republic of the Congo) Andre Bukia	(Portugal) Vila Real	(Portugal) Boavista	Free
25 May 2015	(Spain) Alberto Bueno	(Spain) Rayo Vallecano	(Portugal) Porto	Free
29 May 2015	(Portugal) Tiago Ferreira	(Belgium) Zulte Waregem	(Portugal) União da Madeira	Free
29 May 2015	(Venezuela) Breitner Da Silva	(Venezuela) Mineros de Guayana	(Portugal) União da Madeira	Free
29 May 2015	(Brazil) Gian dos Santos	(Portugal) Sanjoanense	(Portugal) União da Madeira	Free
31 May 2015	(Russia) Vitali Lystsov	(Portugal) União de Leiria	(Portugal) Benfica	Undisclosed
2 June 2015	(Portugal) João Góis	(Portugal) Chaves	(Portugal) Paços de Ferreira	Free
2 June 2015	(Paraguay) Ramón Cardozo	(Paraguay) Tacuary	(Portugal) Moreirense	Loan
2 June 2015	(Serbia) Igor Stefanović	(Portugal) Chaves	(Portugal) Moreirense	Free
2 June 2015	(Brazil) Otávio Silva	(Kuwait) Khaitan	(Portugal) União da Madeira	Free
3 June 2015	(Senegal) Mamadou N'Diaye	(Senegal) US Ouakam	(Portugal) Braga	Free
4 June 2015	(Portugal) André Fontes	(Portugal) Penafiel	(Portugal) Moreirense	Free
4 June 2015	(Portugal) Henrique	(Portugal) Feirense	(Portugal) Boavista	Free
4 June 2015	(Slovenia) Ažbe Jug	(France) Girondins de Bordeaux	(Portugal) Sporting CP	Free
5 June 2015	(Senegal) Pierre Sagna	(Portugal) Chaves	(Portugal) Moreirense	Free
5 June 2015	(Portugal) João Vieira	(Portugal) Chaves	(Portugal) Moreirense	Free
5 June 2015	(Portugal) João Costa	(Portugal) Lusitano Vildemoínho	(Portugal) Vitória de Setúbal	Free
8 June 2015	(Portugal) João Vilela	(Portugal) Gil Vicente	(Portugal) Belenenses	Free
8 June 2015	(Portugal) Emídio Rafael	(Portugal) Estoril	(Portugal) Académica de Coimbra	Free
8 June 2015	(Portugal) Rabiola	(Portugal) Penafiel	(Portugal) Académica de Coimbra	Free
8 June 2015	(Portugal) Rui Nereu	(Portugal) Tondela	(Portugal) Freamunde	Free
9 June 2015	(Portugal) Pedrinho	(France) Lorient	(Portugal) Rio Ave	Free
9 June 2015	(Portugal) Tonel	(Portugal) Feirense	(Portugal) Belenenses	Free
9 June 2015	(Nigeria) Uche Nwofor	(Belgium) Lierse	(Portugal) Boavista	Free
10 June 2015	(Serbia) Miralem Sulejmani	(Portugal) Benfica	(Switzerland) Young Boys	€3,000,000
11 June 2015	(England) Matt Jones	(Portugal) Belenenses	(Portugal) Tondela	Loan
11 June 2015	(Portugal) André Micael	(Poland) Zawisza Bydgoszcz	(Portugal) Moreirense	Free
11 June 2015	(Venezuela) José Manuel Velázquez	(Venezuela) Mineros de Guayana	(Portugal) Arouca	Free
11 June 2015	(Portugal) Pedro Trigueira	(Portugal) União da Madeira	(Portugal) Académica de Coimbra	Free
11 June 2015	(Ivory Coast) Jean Seri	(Portugal) Paços de Ferreira	(France) Nice	€1,000,000
11 June 2015	(Colombia) Santiago Montoya	(Brazil) Vasco da Gama	(Portugal) Vitória de Guimarães	Free
12 June 2015	(Morocco) Adel Taarabt	(England) Queens Park Rangers	(Portugal) Benfica	Free
12 June 2015	(Argentina) Rogelio Funes Mori	(Portugal) Benfica	(Mexico) Monterrey	Undisclosed
13 June 2015	(Morocco) Mehdi Carcela	(Belgium) Standard Liège	(Portugal) Benfica	Undisclosed
16 June 2015	(Portugal) Rúben Fernandes	(Portugal) Estoril	(Belgium) Sint-Truiden	Free
18 June 2015	(Portugal) Cédric Soares	(Portugal) Sporting CP	(England) Southampton	€6,500,000
18 June 2015	(Portugal) Rúben Pinto	(Portugal) Benfica	(Portugal) Belenenses	Undisclosed
19 June 2015	(Portugal) Arsénio	(Portugal) Moreirense	(Bulgaria) Litex Lovech	Free
20 June 2015	(Cameroon) Lewis Enoh	(Portugal) Sporting CP	(Belgium) Lokeren	€300,000
20 June 2015	(Portugal) Vasco Costa	(Portugal) Fafe	(Portugal) Vitória de Setúbal	Free
20 June 2015	(Portugal) João Pedro	(Portugal) Braga	(Cyprus) Apollon Limassol	Loan
21 June 2015	(Portugal) Paulo Monteiro	(Portugal) Chaves	(Portugal) União da Madeira	Free
22 June 2015	(Portugal) Rúben Micael	(Portugal) Braga	(China) Shijiazhuang Ever Bright	€2,500,000
22 June 2015	(Portugal) João Pedro	(Portugal) Moreirense	(Portugal) Famalicão	Free
23 June 2015	(Switzerland) Loris Benito	(Portugal) Benfica	(Switzerland) Young Boys	Undisclosed
23 June 2015	(Brazil) Ewerton	(Russia) Anzhi Makhachkala	(Portugal) Sporting CP	€1,500,000
23 June 2015	(Portugal) Rafa Sousa	(Portugal) Penafiel	(Portugal) Moreirense	Loan
23 June 2015	(Portugal) Marco Baixinho	(Portugal) Mafra	(Portugal) Paços de Ferreira	Loan
23 June 2015	(Portugal) Nuno Valente	(Portugal) Braga	(Portugal) Arouca	Free
24 June 2015	(Cape Verde) Nilson Barros	(Cyprus) Doxa Katokopias	(Portugal) União da Madeira	Free
24 June 2015	(Spain) Juan Carlos	(Portugal) Braga	(Spain) Málaga	Loan
24 June 2015	(Brazil) Alan Schons	(Brazil) Juventude	(Portugal) Moreirense	Free
24 June 2015	(France) Jordan Massengo	(Belgium) Mons	(Portugal) Tondela	Free
26 June 2015	(Brazil) Ederson	(Portugal) Rio Ave	(Portugal) Benfica	Undisclosed
26 June 2015	(Brazil) Marçal	(Portugal) Nacional	(Portugal) Benfica	Undisclosed
26 June 2015	(Portugal) Dálcio	(Portugal) Belenenses	(Portugal) Benfica	Undisclosed
26 June 2015	(Brazil) Diego Lopes	(Portugal) Rio Ave	(Portugal) Benfica	Undisclosed
26 June 2015	(Brazil) Pelé	(Portugal) Belenenses	(Portugal) Benfica	Undisclosed
26 June 2015	(Paraguay) Francisco Vera	(Paraguay) Rubio Ñu	(Portugal) Benfica	Undisclosed
27 June 2015	(Mali) Idrissa Coulibaly	(Morocco) Raja Casablanca	(Portugal) Arouca	Free
27 June 2015	(Portugal) Bruno Gaspar	(Portugal) Benfica	(Portugal) Vitória de Guimarães	Undisclosed
27 June 2015	(Portugal) Paulinho	(Portugal) Moreirense	(Portugal) União da Madeira	Free
28 June 2015	(Portugal) Márcio Sousa	(Portugal) Tondela	(Portugal) Farense	Free
29 June 2015	(Portugal) Dálcio	(Portugal) Benfica	(Portugal) Belenenses	Loan
30 June 2015	(France) Vincent Sasso	(Portugal) Braga	(England) Sheffield Wednesday	Loan
30 June 2015	(Brazil) Jaílson	(Portugal) Paços de Ferreira	(Portugal) Arouca	Free
1 July 2015	(France) Giannelli Imbula	(France) Marseille	(Portugal) Porto	€20,000,000
1 July 2015	(Brazil) Paulo Vinícius	(Brazil) CEOV	(Portugal) Boavista	Free
1 July 2015	(Portugal) Éder	(Portugal) Braga	(Wales) Swansea City	€7,000,000
2 July 2015	(Portugal) Danilo Pereira	(Portugal) Marítimo	(Portugal) Porto	Undisclosed
2 July 2015	(Brazil) Fabiano	(Portugal) Porto	(Turkey) Fenerbahçe	Loan
2 July 2015	(Senegal) Abdoulaye Ba	(Portugal) Porto	(Turkey) Fenerbahçe	Loan
3 July 2015	(Ukraine) Oleksiy Shlyakotin	(Poland) Korona Kielce	(Portugal) União da Madeira	Free
4 July 2015	(Gabon) Randal Oto’o	(Portugal) Braga	(Portugal) Tondela	Loan
4 July 2015	(Portugal) Tozé	(Portugal) Porto	(Portugal) Vitória de Guimarães	Undisclosed
4 July 2015	(Spain) Borja López	(France) Monaco	(Portugal) Arouca	Loan
5 July 2015	(Cape Verde) Zé Luís	(Portugal) Braga	(Russia) Spartak Moscow	€7,000,000
5 July 2015	(Brazil) Carlos Eduardo	(Portugal) Porto	(Saudi Arabia) Al-Hilal	Undisclosed
6 July 2015	(France) Bilal Sebaihi	(Portugal) Beira-Mar	(Portugal) Estoril	Free
6 July 2015	(Austria) Markus Berger	(Portugal) Gil Vicente	(Portugal) Tondela	Free
6 July 2015	(Brazil) Nathan Júnior	(Russia) SKA-Energiya Khabarovsk	(Portugal) Tondela	Free
7 July 2015	(Angola) Dolly Menga	(Portugal) Braga	(Portugal) Tondela	Loan
7 July 2015	(Costa Rica) Bryan Ruiz	(England) Fulham	(Portugal) Sporting CP	Undisclosed
7 July 2015	(France) Billal Sebaihi	(Portugal) Beira-Mar	(Portugal) Estoril	Undisclosed
7 July 2015	(Brazil) Karl Vedova	(Brazil) Caxias	(Portugal) Arouca	Free
7 July 2015	(Brazil) Evaldo	(Portugal) Gil Vicente	(Portugal) Moreirense	Free
7 July 2015	(Ghana) Emmanuel Boateng	(Portugal) Rio Ave	(Portugal) Moreirense	Free
7 July 2015	(Ghana) Ernest Ohemeng	(Portugal) Rio Ave	(Portugal) Moreirense	Free
8 July 2015	(Brazil) Diego Galo	(Portugal) Arouca	(Portugal) União da Madeira	Free
8 July 2015	(Portugal) Rafael Veloso	(Portugal) Belenenses	(Portugal) Oriental	Loan
9 July 2015	(Portugal) Marco Matias	(Portugal) Nacional	(England) Sheffield Wednesday	€2,000,000
9 July 2015	(Portugal) Filipe Gonçalves	(Portugal) Estoril	(Portugal) Moreirense	Free
10 July 2015	(Portugal) André Carvalhas	(Portugal) Tondela	(Portugal) Portimonense	Free
10 July 2015	(Portugal) Bebé	(Portugal) Benfica	(Spain) Rayo Vallecano	Loan
10 July 2015	(Brazil) Nilson	(Iran) Persepolis	(Portugal) Moreirense	Free
10 July 2015	(Portugal) Ivan Cavaleiro	(Portugal) Benfica	(France) Monaco	Undisclosed
10 July 2015	(Portugal) Hélder Costa	(Portugal) Benfica	(France) Monaco	Loan
10 July 2015	(Algeria) Nabil Ghilas	(Portugal) Porto	(Spain) Levante	Loan
11 July 2015	(Brazil) William Gustavo	(Brazil) Grêmio	(Portugal) Académica	Loan
12 July 2015	(Spain) Iker Casillas	(Spain) Real Madrid	(Portugal) Porto	Free
13 July 2015	(Portugal) João Pereira	(Germany) Hannover 96	(Portugal) Sporting CP	Free
13 July 2015	(Brazil) Rafael Bracalli	(Greece) Panetolikos	(Portugal) Arouca	Free
13 July 2015	(Guinea) Tafsir Chérif	(France) Monaco	(Portugal) Arouca	Free
13 July 2015	(Portugal) Josué Pesqueira	(Portugal) Porto	(Turkey) Bursaspor	Loan
14 July 2015	(Uruguay) Mauro Goicoechea	(Portugal) Arouca	(France) Toulouse	Undisclosed
14 July 2015	(Brazil) Kléber	(Portugal) Porto	(China) Beijing Goan	€3,000,000
14 July 2015	(Mexico) Diego Reyes	(Portugal) Porto	(Spain) Real Sociedad	Loan
15 July 2015	(Brazil) Danilo Barbosa	(Portugal) Braga	(Spain) Valencia	Loan
15 July 2015	(Colombia) Jackson Martínez	(Portugal) Porto	(Spain) Atlético Madrid	€35,000,000
15 July 2015	(Brazil) Lucas Souza	(Italy) Parma	(Portugal) Tondela	Free
15 July 2015	(Brazil) Kaká	(Cyprus) APOEL	(Portugal) Tondela	Free
15 July 2015	(Portugal) Sílvio	(Spain) Atlético Madrid	(Portugal) Benfica	Loan
15 July 2015	(Uruguay) Maxi Pereira	Unattached	(Portugal) Porto	Free
16 July 2015	(Portugal) Licá	(Portugal) Porto	(Portugal) Vitória de Guimarães	Loan
16 July 2015	(Venezuela) Jhon Murillo	(Portugal) Benfica	(Portugal) Tondela	Loan
16 July 2015	(Brazil) Otávio	(Portugal) Porto	(Portugal) Vitória de Guimarães	Loan
16 July 2015	(Burkina Faso) Nii Plange	(Portugal) Vitória de Guimarães	(Portugal) Académica	Undisclosed
17 July 2015	(Spain) Iván Balliu	(Portugal) Arouca	(France) Metz	Free
17 July 2015	(Spain) Andrés Fernández	(Portugal) Porto	(Spain) Granada	Loan
17 July 2015	(Brazil) Naldo	(Italy) Udinese	(Portugal) Sporting CP	Undisclosed
18 July 2015	(Brazil) César	(Portugal) Benfica	(Brazil) Flamengo	Loan
18 July 2015	(France) Michaël Ciani	(Italy) Lazio	(Portugal) Sporting CP	Undisclosed
19 July 2015	(Armenia) Gevorg Ghazaryan	(Greece) Kerkyra	(Portugal) Marítimo	Undisclosed
19 July 2015	(Colombia) Teófilo Gutiérrez	(Argentina) River Plate	(Portugal) Sporting CP	Undisclosed
20 July 2015	(Brazil) Derley	(Portugal) Benfica	(Turkey) Kayserispor	Loan
20 July 2015	(Guinea-Bissau) Sami	(Portugal) Porto	(Turkey) Akhisar Belediyespor	Loan
21 July 2015	(Argentina) Lucas Colitto	(Portugal) Arouca	(Argentina) Unión de Santa Fe	Loan
22 July 2015	(Turkey) Sinan Bolat	(Portugal) Porto	(Belgium) Club Brugge	Undisclosed
22 July 2015	(Brazil) Igor Rossi Branco	(Portugal) Marítimo	(Scotland) Hearts	Free
22 July 2015	(Brazil) Diego Lopes	(Portugal) Benfica	(Turkey) Kayserispor	Loan
22 July 2015	(Portugal) Ricardo Quaresma	(Portugal) Porto	(Turkey) Beşiktaş	€1,200,000
24 July 2015	(Brazil) Lima	(Portugal) Benfica	(United Arab Emirates) Al Ahli Club	€7,000,000
28 July 2015	(France) Naby Sarr	(Portugal) Sporting CP	(England) Charlton Athletic	Undisclosed
29 July 2015	(Portugal) Gonçalo Paciência	(Portugal) Porto	(Portugal) Académica de Coimbra	Loan
30 July 2015	(Portugal) Rochinha	(Portugal) Benfica	(Belgium) Standard Liège	Undisclosed
30 July 2015	(Portugal) Rui Fonte	(Portugal) Benfica	(Portugal) Braga	Loan
30 July 2015	(Netherlands) Bilal Ould-Chikh	(Netherlands) Twente	(Portugal) Benfica	Undisclosed
31 July 2015	(Portugal) Romário Baldé	(Portugal) Benfica	(Portugal) Tondela	Loan
31 July 2015	(Portugal) Lucas João	(Portugal) Nacional	(England) Sheffield Wednesday	Undisclosed
1 August 2015	(Portugal) Pelé	(Portugal) Benfica	(Portugal) Paços de Ferreira	Loan
3 August 2015	(Italy) Dani Osvaldo	Unattached	(Portugal) Porto	Free
5 August 2015	(France) Aly Cissokho	(England) Aston Villa	(Portugal) Porto	Loan
6 August 2015	(Greece) Kostas Mitroglou	(England) Fullham	(Portugal) Benfica	Loan
6 August 2015	(Italy) Alberto Aquilani	Unattached	(Portugal) Sporting CP	Free
10 August 2015	(Portugal) Raphael Guzzo	(Portugal) Benfica	(Portugal) Tondela	Loan
12 August 2015	(Portugal) João Palhinha	(Portugal) Sporting CP	(Portugal) Moreirense	Loan
13 August 2015	(Peru) Paolo Hurtado	(Portugal) Paços de Ferreira	(England) Reading	Undisclosed
13 August 2015	(Mexico) Raúl Jiménez	(Spain) Atlético Madrid	(Portugal) Benfica	Undisclosed
13 August 2015	(Argentina) Luis Fariña	(Portugal) Benfica	(Spain) Rayo Vallecano	Loan
13 August 2015	(Brazil) Wallyson Mallmann	(Portugal) Sporting CP	(France) Nice	Loan
13 August 2015	(Portugal) Rúben Semedo	(Portugal) Sporting CP	(Portugal) Vitória de Setúbal	Loan
14 August 2015	(Portugal) Ruben Amorim	(Portugal) Benfica	(Qatar) Al-Wakrah	Loan
16 August 2015	(France) Michaël Ciani	(Portugal) Sporting CP	(Spain) Espanyol	Free
17 August 2015	(Brazil) Caio Rangel	(Italy) Cagliari	(Portugal) Arouca	Loan
17 August 2015	(Venezuela) Renny Vega	(Venezuela) Deportivo La Guaira	(Portugal) União da Madeira	Free
18 August 2015	(Spain) Diego Capel	(Portugal) Sporting CP	(Italy) Genoa	Undisclosed
19 August 2015	(Brazil) Edimar Fraga	(Italy) Chievo Verona	(Portugal) Rio Ave	Loan
20 August 2015	(Uruguay) Jonathan Rodríguez	(Portugal) Benfica	(Spain) Deportivo La Coruña	Loan
20 August 2015	(Brazil) Alex Sandro	(Portugal) Porto	(Italy) Juventus	€26,000,000
21 August 2015	(Spain) Salva Chamorro	(Spain) Lleida Esportiu	(Portugal) Tondela	Free
24 August 2015	(Portugal) Iuri Medeiros	(Portugal) Sporting CP	(Portugal) Moreirense	Loan
25 August 2015	(Brazil) Rafael Martins	(Spain) Levante	(Portugal) Moreirense	Loan
30 August 2015	(São Tomé and Príncipe) Luís Leal	(Cyprus) APOEL	(Portugal) Belenenses	Loan
31 August 2015	(Portugal) Filipe Chaby	(Portugal) Sporting CP	(Portugal) União da Madeira	Loan
31 August 2015	(Honduras) Brayan Beckeles	(Portugal) Boavista	(Mexico) Necaxa	Free
31 August 2015	(Brazil) Rivaldinho	(Brazil) Mogi Mirim	(Portugal) Boavista	Free
31 August 2015	(Portugal) Renato Santos	(Portugal) Rio Ave	(Portugal) Boavista	Free
31 August 2015	(Egypt) Ramy Rabia	(Portugal) Sporting CP	(Egypt) Al Ahly	€750,000
31 August 2015	(Chile) Diego Rubio	(Portugal) Sporting CP	(Spain) Real Valladolid	Undisclosed
31 August 2015	(Portugal) Ricardo	(Portugal) Porto	(France) Nice	Loan
31 August 2015	(Portugal) Rolando	(Portugal) Porto	(France) Marseille	Free
31 August 2015	(Portugal) Tiago Gomes	(Portugal) Braga	(France) Metz	Loan
31 August 2015	(Portugal) Pedro Tiba	(Portugal) Braga	(Spain) Real Valladolid	Loan
31 August 2015	(Portugal) Fábio Martins	(Portugal) Braga	(Portugal) Paços de Ferreira	Loan
31 August 2015	(Portugal) Wilson Eduardo	(Portugal) Sporting CP	(Portugal) Braga	Free
31 August 2015	(Spain) Aarón Ñíguez	(Spain) Elche	(Portugal) Braga	Free
31 August 2015	(Argentina) Rodrigo Battaglia	(Portugal) Braga	(Portugal) Moreirense	Loan
31 August 2015	(Cape Verde) Kuca	(Turkey) Kardemir Karabükspor	(Portugal) Belenenses	Loan
31 August 2015	(Portugal) Hernâni	(Portugal) Porto	(Greece) Olympiacos	Loan
31 August 2015	(Mexico) Jesús Corona	(Netherlands) Twente	(Portugal) Porto	€10,500,000
31 August 2015	(Mexico) Miguel Layún	(England) Watford	(Portugal) Porto	Loan
31 August 2015	(Brazil) Filipe Augusto	(Portugal) Rio Ave	(Portugal) Braga	Loan

- ^1 A player who signed with a club before the opening of the summer transfer window, will officially join his new club on 1 July. While a player who joined a club after 1 July will join his new club following his signature of the contract.
