= Sérgio Conceição (footballer, born 1996) =

Portuguese footballer (born 1996)

Personal information
- Full name: Sérgio Manuel Fernandes da Conceição
- Date of birth: 12 November 1996 (age 30)
- Place of birth: Porto, Portugal
- Height: 1.77 m (5 ft 10 in)
- Position: Right-back

Team information
- Current team: AEL Limassol
- Number: 35

Youth career
- 2009–2010: PAOK
- 2010–2011: Standard Liège
- 2011–2012: CIF
- 2012: Olhanense
- 2013: Imortal
- 2013: Académica
- 2014: Anadia
- 2014: Boavista
- 2015: Varzim

Senior career*
Years	Team	Apps	(Gls)
2015	Felgueiras 1932	2	(0)
2016	Sobrado	11	(0)
2016–2017	Oliveira do Bairro	33	(1)
2017–2018	Espinho	3	(0)
2018	Cesarense	16	(1)
2019	Chaves B	16	(0)
2019–2020	Académica	2	(0)
2020–2022	Estrela Amadora	55	(3)
2022–2023	Seraing	20	(0)
2023	Portimonense	4	(0)
2023–2024	Feirense	36	(6)
2024–2025	Anorthosis Famagusta	29	(6)
2025–	AEL Limassol	40	(5)
- * Club domestic league appearances and goals as of 7 November 2026

Sérgio Manuel Fernandes da Conceição (born 12 November 1996) is a Portuguese professional footballer who plays as a right-back for Cypriot First Division club AEL Limassol.

Having played in the lower leagues until he was 23, he represented Académica de Coimbra, Estrela da Amadora and Feirense in the second tier and Portimonense in the Primeira Liga, as well as a brief spell in the Belgian Pro League with Seraing.

== Career ==
Born in Porto, Conceição played for several clubs in the Portuguese third tier, including the reserve team of Chaves in January 2019. On 2 July that year, he signed for Académica de Coimbra, where he had played as a youth in 2013.

On 28 December 2019, 23-year-old Conceição made his professional debut for Académica in LigaPro as they won 4–3 at home to Oliveirense. He started the game and was substituted for Hugo Almeida with ten minutes to play.

Having made just one more appearance in Coimbra, Conceição left on 20 August 2020 for Estrela da Amadora on a one-year contract, with the club back in the third tier following a merger. In his first season, the club won promotion but lost the final in extra time to Trofense. In 2021–22, he played 29 games as they kept their place in the second division, scoring his first three goals at that level starting with one in a 6–3 home loss to Benfica B on 29 November; two weeks later he struck the only goal from the penalty spot in a win over second-placed neighbours Casa Pia.

On 29 June 2022, Conceição moved abroad for the first time as a professional, signing for Belgian First Division A club RFC Seraing. He had lived in nearby Liège as a child, while his father played for Standard Liège.

Conceição joined Portimonense of the Primeira Liga on a one-and-a-half-year contract with an option for an additional year, on 1 February 2023. He made his debut in the division on 11 March in a 2–0 loss at Chaves, as a 78th-minute substitute for Fahd Moufi.

On 31 July 2023, Liga Portugal 2 side Feirense announced the signing of Conceição.

== Personal life ==
Conceição is the eldest of five sons of former Portugal international footballer and current manager Sérgio Conceição. All of the first four embarked on careers in the sport, including Rodrigo and Francisco.

== Career statistics ==
As of 2 March 2020.

Appearances and goals by club, season and competition
Club	Season	League			National cup		League cup		Continental		Other		Total	
Club	Season	Division	Apps	Goals	Apps	Goals	Apps	Goals	Apps	Goals	Apps	Goals	Apps	Goals
Académica	2019–20	LigaPro	2	0	0	0	0	0	–		0	0	2	0
Career total			2	0	0	0	0	0	0	0	0	0	2	0
