= André Claro =

Portuguese footballer (born 1991)

Personal information
- Full name: André Filipe Claro de Jesus
- Date of birth: 31 March 1991 (age 35)
- Place of birth: Vila Nova de Gaia, Portugal
- Height: 1.83 m (6 ft 0 in)
- Position: Forward

Youth career
- 2001–2004: Dragões Sandinenses
- 2004–2010: Porto
- 2006–2007: → Padroense (loan)

Senior career*
Years	Team	Apps	(Gls)
2010–2012	Famalicão	62	(24)
2012–2015	Arouca	83	(8)
2015–2017	Vitória Setúbal	50	(16)
2017–2018	Estoril	36	(3)
2018–2019	Boavista	16	(1)
2019	Académica	2	(1)
2019–2020	Leixões	18	(6)
2020–2021	Vilafranquense	30	(6)
2021–2022	Académico Viseu	25	(1)
2022	Union Touarga	3	(0)
2022–2023	Valadares Gaia	23	(9)
2023–2025	São João Ver	49	(7)
2025–2026	Ovarense	25	(6)

International career
2007	Portugal U16	2	(1)
2008–2009	Portugal U18	9	(2)
- * Club domestic league appearances and goals as of 16:35, 15 November 2026 (UTC)

André Filipe Claro de Jesus (born 31 March 1991), known as Claro, is a Portuguese professional footballer who plays as a forward.

== Club career ==
Born in Vila Nova de Gaia, Porto District, Claro arrived in FC Porto's youth system in 2004, aged 13. He went on to progress through every youth rank at the club, being occasionally summoned to the first team for training.

Released by the Dragons in the summer of 2010, Claro signed for F.C. Famalicão in the fourth division, scoring 14 goals in 32 matches in his first season which ended in promotion to the third tier. He added ten in 30 the following campaign.

Claro joined F.C. Arouca of the Segunda Liga for 2012–13, scoring in only his second game in the competition, a 3–0 away win against F.C. Penafiel on 22 August 2012. He contributed 31 appearances and four goals, as the team promoted to the Primeira Liga for the first time in their history. He made his debut in the competition on 18 August 2013 by coming on as a late substitute in a 5–1 away loss to Sporting CP, and scored for the first time on 22 December that year in a 3–0 away defeat of Gil Vicente F.C. where he netted a brace.

On 13 July 2015, after his contract expired, Claro signed a two-year deal with Vitória F.C. also in the top flight. He scored a career-best (at the professional level) 12 goals in his first season, as they narrowly avoided relegation; this included two in the 3–1 victory at C.D. Tondela on 20 December.

After further spells in the main division with G.D. Estoril Praia and Boavista FC, Claro resumed his career in the second tier with Académica de Coimbra, Leixões SC, U.D. Vilafranquense and Académico de Viseu FC. He then moved to the Moroccan Botola with Union de Touarga.
