= Mauro Cerqueira =

Portuguese footballer

Personal information
- Full name: Mauro Rafael Geral Cerqueira
- Date of birth: 20 August 1992 (age 34)
- Place of birth: Loures, Portugal
- Height: 1.81 m (5 ft 11 1/2 in)
- Position: Left-back

Youth career
- 2000–2007: Sporting CP
- 2007–2010: Estrela Amadora
- 2010–2011: Real Massamá

Senior career*
Years	Team	Apps	(Gls)
2012–2013	Eléctrico	13	(1)
2013–2014	Naval	15	(2)
2014–2015	Moura	25	(2)
2015–2019	Nacional	40	(3)
2019–2020	Académica	18	(0)
2020–2021	Újpest	5	(0)
2022–2023	Hebar	7	(0)
Total		123	(8)
- * Club domestic league appearances and goals

Mauro Rafael Geral Cerqueira (born 20 August 1992) is a Portuguese former professional footballer who played as a left-back.
