= Tiago Pereira (footballer, born 1995) =

Portuguese footballer

Personal information
- Full name: Tiago Luís Caetano Pereira
- Date of birth: 20 June 1995 (age 31)
- Place of birth: Lisbon, Portugal
- Height: 1.92 m (6 ft 4 in)
- Position: Goalkeeper

Team information
- Current team: Varzim
- Number: 1

Youth career
- 2004–2008: Benfica
- 2008–2009: Odivelas
- 2009–2012: ADCEO
- 2012–2013: Belenenses
- 2013–2014: Real

Senior career*
Years	Team	Apps	(Gls)
2014–2015	1º de Dezembro	6	(0)
2015–2021	Braga B	52	(0)
2019–2020	→ Académica (loan)	6	(0)
2021–	Varzim	12	(0)
- * Club domestic league appearances and goals as of 10 June 2024

Tiago Luís Caetano Pereira (born 20 June 1995) is a Portuguese footballer who plays for Varzim as a goalkeeper.

== Career ==
On 3 January 2016, Pereira made his professional debut with Braga B in a 2015–16 Segunda Liga match against Sporting B, winning 1–0 away. On 12 May 2018, after the team avoided relegation on the final day despite losing by the same score at the same opponents, he and opponent Pedro Delgado were sent off.

On 16 July 2019, Pereira was loaned to fellow second division team Académica de Coimbra for the upcoming season. He played eight total games, but took no part at Braga on his return, leading to him joining Varzim S.C. in June 2021.
