= Blaise Kilizou Abalo =

Togolese filmmaker (1947–2013)

- Born: Blaise Kilizou Abalo; 1 January 1947; Kanianboua, Togo
- Died: 16 October 2013 (aged 65–66); Togo
- Occupation(s): Filmmaker, psychologist
- Years active: 1976–2009
- Children: 5

Blaise Kilizou Abalo (1 January 1947 – 16 October 2013) was a Togolese director, producer, and screenwriter. He is best known for directing the first Togolese feature length fiction in Togolese cinema, Kawilasi. He was also a psychologist, teacher and director by training.

== Personal life ==
Abalo was born in 1947 at the Kanianboua, Togo.

He was married to a Burkinabe woman and was a father of five children.

He died on 16 October 2013 at the age of 66 after a long battle with cancer.

== Career ==
At the age of 9, Abalo discovered the seventh art, particularly through Hindi movies and Kpèlèbé cinema. Later he studied film making and later graduated in law and psychology as well. Then he worked as a lecturer from 1978 to 1981 at the University of Ouagadougou. In the meantime, he made a collaboration with the African Institute for Film Education in Burkina Faso. In January 1977, he directed his first docu-fiction 10 ans de pouvoir du Président Éyadéma (on the 10 years of President Eyadema). He was also appointed as the assistant to the Director of CINEATO, currently known as CNPA. Meanwhile, he started to teach at the National Pedagogical Institute IPN, currently as DIFOP.

By using his knowledge as an educational psychologist he started to direct films. He started his cinematic career in 1976 by producing a documentary called 10 ans de pouvoir du Président Eyama, which was pursued it until 2009. In 1992, he directed the film Kawilasi, which made history as the first Togolese feature length fiction in Togolese cinema. In 1995, the film won the Special Prize of Sustainable Human Development at the Panafrican Film and Television Festival of Ouagadougou (FESPACO). Then he made several popular films and documentaries such as: Coopération Franco-Togolaise, La révolte de l'ombre, Le cri du silence, Le mirage de l'espoir, and Le prix du vélo. Later he directed the 14-episode television serial, Dikanakou (Le sida) which was very popular in Togo.

== Filmography ==
Year	Film	Role	Genre	Ref.
1976	10 ans de pouvoir du Président Éyadéma	Director	Documentary short	
1980	Directeus D'École	Director, writer	short documentary	
1992	Kawilasi	Director, writer, producer	Film	
1998	La coopération Franco-Togolaise	Director	Documentary short	
1998	La Revolte De L'ombre	Director, writer	short documentary	
2002	Le Cri Du Silence	Director, writer	short documentary	
2006	Le Mirage De L'espoir	Director, writer	short documentary	
2009	Venu De France	Director, writer	Film	
