= Daniel Azevedo =

Portuguese footballer

Personal information
- Full name: Daniel Grilo Azevedo
- Date of birth: 12 February 1998 (age 28)
- Place of birth: Lisbon, Portugal
- Height: 1.95 m (6 ft 5 in)
- Position: Goalkeeper

Team information
- Current team: Casa Pia
- Number: 22

Youth career
- 2006–2018: Benfica

Senior career*
Years	Team	Apps	(Gls)
2018–2019	Benfica B	1	(0)
2019–2022	Académica	0	(0)
2021–2022	→ Sertanense (loan)	24	(0)
2022–2024	Belenenses	1	(0)
2024–	Casa Pia	4	(0)
2026	→ Amora (loan)	7	(0)

International career^{‡}
2014	Portugal U16	4	(0)
2014	Portugal U17	2	(0)
- * Club domestic league appearances and goals as of 6 September 2026 ‡ National team caps and goals as of 16:50, 20 June 2019 (UTC)

Daniel Grilo Azevedo (born 12 February 1998) is a Portuguese professional footballer who plays as a goalkeeper for Primeira Liga club Casa Pia.

== Career ==
On 15 January 2024, Azevedo left Liga Portugal 2 club Belenenses and joined Primeira Liga side Casa Pia, with the former keeping hold of 50% of his economic rights.

On 21 January 2026, Azevedo was sent on loan to Liga 3 club Amora until the end of the 2025–26 season.

== Career statistics ==
=== Club ===
As of match played 11 March 2023

Appearances and goals by club, season and competition
Club	Season	League			National cup		League cup		Total	
Club	Season	Division	Apps	Goals	Apps	Goals	Apps	Goals	Apps	Goals
Benfica B	2018–19	LigaPro	1	0	—		—		1	0
Académica	2019–20	LigaPro	0	0	0	0	0	0	0	0
Académica	2020–21	Liga Portugal 2	0	0	1	0	—		1	0
Académica	Total		0	0	1	0	0	0	1	0
Sertanense	2021–22	Campeonato de Portugal	24	0	2	0	—		26	0
Belenenses	2022–23	Liga 3	1	0	2	0	—		3	0
Belenenses	2023–24	Liga Portugal 2	0	0	0	0	0	0	0	0
Belenenses	Total		1	0	2	0	0	0	3	0
Casa Pia	2023–24	Primeira Liga	0	0	0	0	0	0	0	0
Career total			26	0	5	0	0	0	31	0

== Honours ==
Benfica

- UEFA Youth League runner-up: 2016–17
