= Pedro Pinto (footballer, born 1951) =

Chilean footballer

Personal information
- Full name: Pedro Rosamel Pinto Jara
- Date of birth: 20 March 1951 (age 75)
- Place of birth: El Monte, Chile
- Height: 1.75 m (5 ft 9 in)
- Position: Left winger

Youth career
- CD Caupolicán
- 1968: Colo-Colo

Senior career*
Years	Team	Apps	(Gls)
1969–1970	Colo-Colo	10	(1)
1971–1973	Green Cross-Temuco	45	(9)
1974–1983	Palestino	216	(60)
1976	→ Atlético Potosino (loan)		
1981	→ San Antonio Unido (loan)		

International career
1974–1979	Chile	8	(0)
- * Club domestic league appearances and goals

Pedro Rosamel Pinto Jara (born 20 March 1951) is a Chilean former footballer who played as a left winger. Besides Chile, he played in Mexico.

== Club career ==
Mainly a left winger, Pinto was with Club Deportivo Caupolicán from his hometown, El Monte, as a youth player.

In 1968, he joined the Colo-Colo youth system and made his professional debut a year later in a match against Magallanes. As a member of them, he won the 1970 Primera División.

From 1971 to 1973, Pinto played for Green Cross-Temuco, ending his contract after an argument about a permission with the club's manager.

In 1974, he switched to Palestino thanks to the coach Caupolicán Peña. A historical player of a successful stint of them, he won three titles, the 1978 Primera División and the Copa Chile in 1975 and 1977, and took part in the Copa Libertadores.

He also had stints with Mexican Primera División side Atlético Potosino in the second half of 1976, coinciding with his compatriot Eduardo Peralta, and Chilean Segunda División side San Antonio Unido in 1981.

== International career ==
Pinto made eight appearances for the Chile national team between 1974 and 1979, winning the friendship trophies Copa Acosta Ñu in 1974 and Copa Juan Pinto Durán in 1979.

== Personal life ==
Pinto is the oldest of five siblings.

His son of the same name, Pedro Pinto Carvajal, is an amateur footballer who has played and served as coach for CD Caupolicán.
