= Abalos =

Abalos is a surname. Notable people with the surname include:

- Alfredo Ábalos (born 1986), Argentine footballer
- Benjamin Abalos (born 1935), Filipino politician
- Benjamin Abalos Jr. (born 1962), Filipino politician and son of the above
- Carmelita Abalos (born 1962), Filipino politician, wife of Benjamin Abalos Jr., and current mayor of Mandaluyong
- Coraje Ábalos (born 1972), Argentine actor
- Iñaki Ábalos (born 1956), Spanish architect and author
- Jason Abalos (born 1986), Filipino actor
- Jing Abalos (born 1941), Filipino film actor
- José Luis Ábalos (born 1959), Spanish politician
- Rafael Ábalos (born 1956), Spanish fantasy author

== See also ==
- Ábalos, municipality in La Rioja, Spain
- Abalos & Herreros, Spanish architectural firm
- Abalos Undae, a dune field on Mars at Abalos Mensa
- House of Ávalos (sometimes spelled Ábalos), Italian aristocratic family of Spanish origin
