= Serginho (footballer, born 1996) =

Portuguese footballer

Personal information
- Full name: Sérgio Daniel Sousa Silva
- Date of birth: 10 October 1996 (age 30)
- Height: 1.83 m (6 ft 0 in)
- Position: Right winger

Team information
- Current team: Marco 09
- Number: 24

Youth career
- 2009–2015: Oliveirense

Senior career*
Years	Team	Apps	(Gls)
2015–2020	Oliveirense	99	(10)
2019	→ Gondomar (loan)	13	(2)
2020–2021	Águeda	13	(1)
2021	Interclube		
2021–2022	Benfica Castelo Branco	23	(4)
2022–	Marco 09	45	(9)
- * Club domestic league appearances and goals as of 20:10, 27 December 2023 (UTC)

Sérgio Daniel Sousa Silva (born 10 October 1996) known as Serginho, is a Portuguese footballer who plays for AD Marco 09 as a right winger.

== Football career ==
On 9 December 2015, Serginho made his professional debut with Oliveirense in a 2015–16 Segunda Liga match against Feirense.

UD Oliveirense announced on 31 January 2019, that they had loaned out Serginho to Gondomar, so he could get some more playing time.
