= Eduardo Peralta =

Chilean footballer (born 1947)

Personal information
- Full name: Eduardo Héctor Peralta Castillo
- Date of birth: 18 April 1947 (age 79)
- Place of birth: Antofagasta, Chile
- Position: Defensive midfielder

Youth career
- Universidad de Chile

Senior career*
Years	Team	Apps	(Gls)
1966–1972	Universidad de Chile	125	(11)
1967	→ Antofagasta Portuario (loan)		
1972–1975	San Luis Potosí		
1976	Atlético Potosino		
1977–1978	Universidad de Chile	54	(2)
1979–1980	Aviación	37	(2)
1981–1983	Deportes Antofagasta		
1984	Regional Atacama	2	(0)
1984–1985	Unión San Felipe	21	(0)
1988	Regional Atacama		

International career
1971–1972	Chile	12	(2)
- * Club domestic league appearances and goals

Eduardo Héctor Peralta Castillo (born 18 April 1947) is a Chilean former footballer who played as a defensive midfielder for clubs in Chile and Mexico.

== Club career ==
A product of Universidad de Chile youth system, he made his debut in 1966 making two appearances, and stayed with the club until 1972. Peralta scored a remembered goal against the Uruguayan club Nacional in the second phase of the 1970 Copa Libertadores, where the team reached the semi-finals.

Next he spent five seasons in Mexico with San Luis Potosí (1972–75) and Atlético Potosino (1976), coinciding in the Mexican football with his former fellow Roberto Hodge and also his compatriots Osvaldo Castro and Pedro Pinto. He returned to Universidad de Chile in 1977.

After leaving Universidad de Chile, he played for Aviación, Deportes Antofagasta, Regional Atacama and Unión San Felipe.

== International career ==
Peralta made twelve appearances for the Chile national team from 1971 to 1972 and scored two goals against Bolivia on 15 August 1971.

== Honours ==
Universidad de Chile

- Chilean Primera División (1): 1969
- Copa Francisco Candelori (1): 1969
- Torneo Metropolitano de Chile (2): 1968, 1969

Chile

- Copa del Pacífico (1): 1971
- Copa Juan Pinto Durán (1): 1971
