= Pedro Pinto (footballer, born 2000) =

Portuguese association footballer

Personal information
- Full name: Pedro José Moura Duarte Pinto
- Date of birth: 8 January 2000 (age 26)
- Place of birth: Lisbon, Portugal
- Height: 1.74 m (5 ft 9 in)
- Position: Midfielder

Team information
- Current team: Cova da Piedade
- Number: 88

Youth career
- 2009–2016: Benfica
- 2016–2018: Sacavenense
- 2018–2019: Académica

Senior career*
Years	Team	Apps	(Gls)
2019–2021	Académica	5	(0)
2021–	Cova da Piedade	3	(0)
- * Club domestic league appearances and goals as of 18 September 2021

Pedro José Moura Duarte Pinto (born 8 January 2000) is a Portuguese professional footballer who plays for Cova da Piedade as a midfielder.

== Football career ==
He made his LigaPro debut for Académica on 5 October 2019 in a game against Benfica B.
