= Júlio Neiva =

Portuguese footballer

Personal information
- Full name: Júlio Alberto Pereira Neiva
- Date of birth: 28 March 1996 (age 30)
- Place of birth: Barcelos, Portugal
- Height: 1.92 m (6 ft 3 1/2 in)
- Position: Goalkeeper

Team information
- Current team: Lusitânia

Youth career
- 2005–2009: Núcleo Andorinhas
- 2009–2010: Sporting Braga
- 2010–2011: Marinhas
- 2011: Sporting Braga
- 2011–2015: Gil Vicente

Senior career*
Years	Team	Apps	(Gls)
2015–2018	Gil Vicente	15	(0)
2018	→ Oleiros (loan)	11	(0)
2018–2020	Académica	4	(0)
2019–2020	→ AD Oliveirense (loan)	22	(0)
2020–2021	Felgueiras 1932	24	(0)
2021–	Lusitânia		

International career
2015	Portugal U19	1	(0)
- * Club domestic league appearances and goals as of 1 August 2021

Júlio Alberto Pereira Neiva (born 28 March 1996 in Barcelos) is a Portuguese professional footballer who plays for Lusitânia as a goalkeeper.

== Football career ==
On 30 July 2016, Neiva made his professional debut with Gil Vicente in a 2016–17 Taça da Liga match against Académica.

On 28 June 2018, Neiva agreed to a one-year deal with Académica de Coimbra.
