= Ricardo Ribeiro =

Portuguese footballer

Personal information
- Full name: Ricardo Abreu Ribeiro
- Date of birth: 27 January 1990 (age 36)
- Place of birth: Moreira de Cónegos, Portugal
- Height: 1.83 m (6 ft 0 in)
- Position: Goalkeeper

Team information
- Current team: Oliveirense
- Number: 31

Youth career
- 2001–2009: Moreirense

Senior career*
Years	Team	Apps	(Gls)
2008–2013	Moreirense	37	(0)
2013–2014	→ Estoril (loan)	2	(0)
2014–2015	Académico Viseu	5	(0)
2015	Olhanense	18	(0)
2015–2016	Belenenses	6	(0)
2016–2018	Académica	77	(0)
2018–2020	Paços Ferreira	62	(0)
2020–2022	Al-Jabalain	69	(0)
2022–2023	Oliveirense	31	(0)
2023–2024	Leixões	12	(0)
2025–	Oliveirense	49	(0)
- * Club domestic league appearances and goals as of 02:59, 25 August 2026 (UTC)

Ricardo Abreu Ribeiro (born 27 January 1990) is a Portuguese professional footballer who plays as a goalkeeper for Liga 3 club Oliveirense.

== Club career ==
Born in Moreira de Cónegos, Guimarães, Ribeiro joined local Moreirense FC's youth ranks at the age of 11. He was definitely promoted to the first team in 2009–10 with the club in the third division (two games played as the season ended in promotion), going on to act as second or third choice the following years.

Ribeiro made his Primeira Liga debut on 19 August 2012, in a 1–1 away draw against F.C. Paços de Ferreira. He appeared in a further 19 matches during the campaign, which ended in relegation.

In the following years, Ribeiro alternated between the top division and the Segunda Liga, representing G.D. Estoril Praia, Académico de Viseu FC, S.C. Olhanense, C.F. Os Belenenses, Académica de Coimbra and Paços Ferreira. He moved abroad for the first time in his career in September 2020, signing with Saudi First Division League side Al-Jabalain Club as they were managed by his compatriot Filipe Gouveia.

Ribeiro returned to his homeland on 28 July 2022, agreeing to a contract at second-tier U.D. Oliveirense. He remained in that league subsequently, with Leixões S.C. and again with Oliveirense.

== Honours ==
Paços Ferreira

- LigaPro: 2018–19
