= Paulo Monteiro (footballer, born 1985) =

Portuguese footballer

Personal information
- Full name: Paulo Armando da Silva Monteiro
- Date of birth: 21 January 1985 (age 41)
- Place of birth: Guimarães, Portugal
- Height: 1.92 m (6 ft 4 in)
- Position: Centre back

Team information
- Current team: Fafe
- Number: 37

Youth career
- 1995–1996: Os Sandinenses
- 1996–2000: Vitória Guimarães
- 2000–2001: Os Sandinenses
- 2001–2004: Braga

Senior career*
| Years | Team | Apps | (Gls) |
| 2004–2006 | Braga B | 35 | (1) |
| 2005 | Braga | 1 | (0) |
| 2006–2007 | Istres | 2 | (0) |
| 2007 | Farul Constanța | 0 | (0) |
| 2008 | Charlton Athletic | 0 | (0) |
| 2008–2009 | Amarante | 8 | (0) |
| 2009–2010 | Gondomar | 32 | (2) |
| 2011 | Praiense | 15 | (1) |
| 2011–2012 | Espinho | 30 | (0) |
| 2012–2013 | Santa Clara | 25 | (1) |
| 2013–2014 | Académico Viseu | 30 | (3) |
| 2014–2015 | Chaves | 21 | (2) |
| 2015 | Concordia Chiajna | 0 | (0) |
| 2015–2016 | União Madeira | 33 | (1) |
| 2016–2017 | Feirense | 13 | (0) |
| 2018 | Real Massamá | 18 | (1) |
| 2018 | Mafra | 0 | (0) |
| 2018– | Fafe | 44 | (5) |

International career
| 2003 | Portugal U18 | 3 | (0) |
| 2003–2004 | Portugal U19 | 7 | (0) |
| 2004–2005 | Portugal U20 | 11 | (0) |
- * Club domestic league appearances and goals as of 2 February 2020

Paulo Armando da Silva Monteiro (born 21 January 1985) is a Portuguese footballer who plays for AD Fafe as a central defender.

== Club career ==
Born in Guimarães, Monteiro finished his formation at S.C. Braga, making his senior debuts with the reserves in the third division. On 5 November 2005 he played his first official game with the first team, coming on as a substitute for injured Paulo Jorge in the 30th minute of a 0–1 away loss against C.S. Marítimo; it would be his only Primeira Liga appearance in ten years.

From 2006 to 2008, Monteiro played abroad, but only managed to appear in two league matches combined for FC Istres (Ligue 2), FC Farul Constanţa (Liga I) and Charlton Athletic in the Football League Championship. During his spell with the Addicks he was also pursued by lowly Accrington Stanley, but the deal fell through due to lack of international clearance, and he was released in July 2008 without any official appearances.

Returned to his country, Monteiro played four seasons in the third level, with Amarante FC, Gondomar SC, S.C. Praiense and S.C. Espinho. He joined division two side C.D. Santa Clara in 2012–13, moving to fellow league team Académico de Viseu F.C. for the following campaign.

In June 2015, after a very brief spell in Romania, Monteiro signed with C.F. União, newly promoted to the top flight. On 18 October, in a Taça de Portugal third-round tie against Sertanense FC, he scored a hat-trick of penalties in a 5–1 away win.

On 30 June 2016, after suffering relegation, Monteiro joined C.D. Feirense also in the top tier on a one-year contract.

== International career ==
Three youth categories comprised, Monteiro won 21 caps for Portugal, including 11 for the under-20s.
