= Donald Djoussé =

Cameroonian footballer (born 1990)

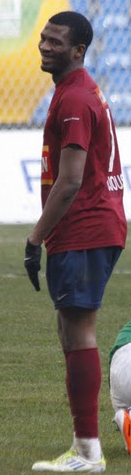
- Djoussé with Pogoń Szczecin in 2011

Personal information
- Full name: Donald Dering Djoussé
- Date of birth: 18 March 1990 (age 36)
- Place of birth: Douala, Cameroon
- Height: 1.83 m (6 ft 0 in)
- Position: Striker

Team information
- Current team: Rebordosa
- Number: 39

Youth career
- 2002–2004: Matelots
- 2004–2005: Kadji Sports Academy
- 2005–2007: Mount Cameroon

Senior career*
Years	Team	Apps	(Gls)
2007–2011	Dinamo Tbilisi	60	(9)
2008	→ FC Borjomi (loan)	9	(0)
2011–2014	Pogoń Szczecin	57	(13)
2014	JS Saoura	12	(2)
2015	Pogoń Siedlce	16	(3)
2015–2016	Olimpia Grudziądz	17	(1)
2016–2018	Marítimo	15	(2)
2017	Marítimo B	1	(0)
2017−2018	→ Académica (loan)	32	(10)
2018−2020	Académica	41	(8)
2020−2021	Casa Pia	18	(0)
2021−2022	São João de Ver	10	(1)
2022−2023	Vila Meã	18	(0)
2023−	Rebordosa		

International career
2009	Cameroon U20	2	(0)
- * Club domestic league appearances and goals as of 17 March 2024

Donald Dering Djoussé (born 18 March 1990) is a Cameroonian footballer who plays as a striker for Portuguese club Rebordosa.

== Career ==
He netted nine league goals for Dinamo Tbilisi; seven of these have been scored from bicycle kicks, a skill in which he specializes. He scored twice in the 7–1 home win against Samtredia on 11 March 2011.

In July 2011, he joined Polish club Pogoń Szczecin on a three-year contract.

On the last day of the winter 2015–16 transfer window, Djoussé signed a two-and-a-half-year with Portuguese side Marítimo.

On 18 July 2017, Djousse joined Académica de Coimbra on a season-long loan. After his contract with the Verde-Rubros expired, Djoussé signed a permanent deal with Académica de Coimbra.

== Honours ==
Dinamo Tbilisi

- Georgian Cup: 2008–09
