= Leandro Cardoso =

Portuguese footballer (born 1999)

Personal information
- Full name: Leandro Fernandes Cardoso
- Date of birth: 11 May 1999 (age 27)
- Place of birth: Figueira da Foz, Portugal
- Height: 1.80 m (5 ft 11 in)
- Position: Striker

Team information
- Current team: Marítimo B
- Number: 11

Youth career
- 2008–2010: Naval
- 2010–2012: Sporting
- 2012–2013: Naval
- 2013–2014: Académica
- 2014–2015: Padroense
- 2015–2016: FC Porto
- 2016–2018: Académica
- 2018–: Marítimo

Senior career*
Years	Team	Apps	(Gls)
2017–2018	Académica	3	(0)
2018–	Marítimo	3	(0)
2018–2022	Marítimo B	7	(2)
2022–	Paredes	19	(2)
- * Club domestic league appearances and goals as of 10:01, 24 September 2023 (UTC)

Leandro Fernandes Cardoso (born 11 May 1999) is a Portuguese professional footballer who plays for Marítimo B as a forward.

== Club career ==
Born in Figueira da Foz, Cardoso began playing at hometown club Associação Naval 1º de Maio and also had brief youth spells at Sporting CP and FC Porto before joining Académica de Coimbra in 2016. On 12 January 2017, he made his professional debut in a 2016–17 LigaPro match at home to S.C. Olhanense, as an 82nd-minute substitute for Ernest Ohemeng in a 2–0 win.

After two more appearances off the bench for the Students, Cardoso transferred to C.S. Marítimo in 2018 and signed his first professional contract that December, after good performances for their under-23 side. The following 14 April he made his Primeira Liga debut, playing the final two minutes of a 2–0 home win over C.D. Feirense in place of René Santos, and made two other cameos over the rest of the season.
