= Rúben Saldanha =

Portuguese footballer

Personal information
- Full name: Rúben Filipe Oliveira Saldanha
- Date of birth: 26 January 1988 (age 38)
- Place of birth: Arcozelo, Portugal
- Height: 1.68 m (5 ft 6 in)
- Position: Attacking midfielder

Youth career
- 1995–1998: Arcozelo
- 1998–2002: Porto
- 2002–2007: Leixões

Senior career*
Years	Team	Apps	(Gls)
2007–2008	Padroense		
2008–2009	Esmoriz	28	(1)
2009–2011	Varzim	33	(1)
2011–2012	Rapperswil-Jona	30	(9)
2012–2013	Schaffhausen	21	(3)
2013–2014	Leixões	32	(1)
2014–2015	Tondela	29	(0)
2016–2018	Santa Clara	85	(5)
2018–2019	Académica	11	(0)
2019	Loures	8	(0)
2020	Torreense	3	(0)
2020–2021	Canelas	12	(1)
2021–2022	Espinho	16	(1)
Total		308	(22)

International career
2008	Portugal U20	10	(0)
- * Club domestic league appearances and goals

Rúben Filipe Oliveira Saldanha (born 26 January 1988) is a Portuguese former professional footballer who played as an attacking midfielder.

== Club career ==
Born in Arcozelo (Vila Nova de Gaia), Porto District, Saldanha represented three clubs as a youth, including FC Porto from ages 10 to 14. He played amateur football in his first two years as a senior, moving to the Segunda Liga with Varzim S.C. in 2009 and remaining two full seasons there.

After two years in Switzerland, with lower league sides FC Rapperswil-Jona and FC Schaffhausen, Saldanha returned to Leixões and the Portuguese second division on a one-year contract. His first three competitive matches were in the Taça da Liga, and he managed to score two goals including a last-minute effort against Atlético Clube de Portugal that allowed his team to advance to the next round after the 3–2 home win.

Saldanha remained in the second tier the following years, representing C.D. Tondela, C.D. Santa Clara and Académica de Coimbra.
