= Júnior Monteiro =

Cape Verdean footballer

Personal information
- Full name: Gildo Olímpio Sena Monteiro
- Date of birth: 20 April 1991 (age 35)
- Place of birth: Nossa Senhora da Graça, Cape Verde
- Height: 1.80 m (5 ft 11 in)
- Position: Winger

Senior career*
Years	Team	Apps	(Gls)
2013–2014	Sporting Praia		
2014–2016	Camacha	38	(12)
2016–2017	Pinhalnovense	29	(8)
2017–2018	União Madeira	33	(6)
2018–2019	Académica	24	(6)
2019–2020	Leixões	12	(0)
2020	Cova da Piedade	5	(2)
2020–2021	Arouca	7	(0)
2021–2022	Real	16	(1)
2023–	Mt Druitt Rangers	0	(0)

International career
2018–	Cape Verde	1	(0)
- * Club domestic league appearances and goals as of 29 February 2023

Gildo Olímpio Sena Monteiro (born 20 April 1991), simply known as Júnior, is a Cape Verdean professional footballer who plays as a winger for National Premier Leagues NSW club Mt Druitt Rangers.

== Club career ==
On June 19, 2017, it was confirmed that Júnior had joined LigaPro side União da Madeira.

On 12 August 2018, after suffering team relegation, Júnior signed for Académica de Coimbra.

== International career ==
Júnior made his debut for the Cape Verde national football team in a 0–0 (4–3) penalty shootout win over Andorra on 3 June 2018.
