= Reko (footballer) =

Portuguese footballer

Personal information
- Full name: Luís Manuel Gonçalves Silva
- Date of birth: 25 July 1995 (age 31)
- Place of birth: Barcelos, Portugal
- Height: 1.79 m (5 ft 10 1/2 in)
- Position: Midfielder

Team information
- Current team: União de Leiria
- Number: 8

Youth career
- 2002–2008: Gil Vicente
- 2008–2010: Sporting
- 2010−2014: Braga

Senior career*
Years	Team	Apps	(Gls)
2014−2016	Braga B	18	(0)
2016	Vilaverdense	10	(0)
2016–2018	Gil Vicente	52	(2)
2018–2019	Académica	27	(2)
2019–2021	Alcorcón	27	(0)
2021–2022	Académica	31	(1)
2022–2026	Penafiel	118	(15)
2026–	União de Leiria	1	(0)
- * Club domestic league appearances and goals as of 13 September 2026

Luís Manuel Gonçalves Silva (born 25 July 1995), commonly known as Reko, is a Portuguese footballer who plays for Liga Portugal 2 club União de Leiria as a midfielder.
