= Joel Ferreira =

Portuguese footballer (born 1992)

Personal information
- Full name: Joel António Soares Ferreira
- Date of birth: 10 January 1992 (age 34)
- Place of birth: Porto, Portugal
- Height: 1.80 m (5 ft 11 in)
- Position: Left-back

Team information
- Current team: Maia Lidador
- Number: 29

Youth career
- 2002–2010: Porto
- 2007–2008: → Padroense (loan)
- 2010–2011: Gondomar

Senior career*
Years	Team	Apps	(Gls)
2011–2015	Gondomar	113	(3)
2015–2016	Mafra	37	(0)
2016–2018	Estoril	42	(0)
2018–2019	Académica	18	(0)
2019–2020	Mafra	24	(5)
2020–2022	Arouca	23	(0)
2022	Chaves	1	(0)
2022–2023	Leixões	24	(0)
2024–2026	Trofense	60	(1)
2026–	Maia Lidador	3	(0)
- * Club domestic league appearances and goals as of 13 September 2026

Joel António Soares Ferreira (born 10 January 1992) is a Portuguese professional footballer who plays as a left-back for Campeonato de Portugal club Maia Lidador.

== Club career ==
Born in Porto, Ferreira spent his first four years as a senior with local team Gondomar S.C. in the third division. In summer 2015 he signed with C.D. Mafra, making his professional debut on 8 August by playing the full 90 minutes in a 1–1 away draw against Gil Vicente F.C. in the Segunda Liga.

On 21 June 2016, after suffering relegation, Ferreira signed a three-year deal with G.D. Estoril Praia. He first appeared in the Primeira Liga on 15 August, starting a 0–2 home loss to C.D. Feirense.

Ferreira returned to the second tier on 12 July 2018, joining Académica de Coimbra. He continued competing at that level the following seasons with Mafra and F.C. Arouca, contributing 22 matches (26 in all competitions) in 2020–21 as the latter club won two promotions in two years to return to the top flight.

On 21 January 2022, after only four official games in the first half of the campaign, Ferreira left the Estádio Municipal de Arouca as a free agent and returned to division two with G.D. Chaves. In the following years, he represented Leixões SC (second tier) and C.D. Trofense (Liga 3).

== Career statistics ==
As of match played 4 May 2025

Appearances and goals by club, season and competition
Club	Season	League			Taça de Portugal		Taça da Liga		Other		Total	
Club	Season	Division	Apps	Goals	Apps	Goals	Apps	Goals	Apps	Goals	Apps	Goals
Gondomar	2011–12	Segunda Divisão	21	0	1	0	—		—		22	0
Gondomar	2012–13	Segunda Divisão	30	0	0	0	—		—		30	0
Gondomar	2013–14	Campeonato Nacional de Seniores	32	3	0	0	—		—		32	3
Gondomar	2014–15	Campeonato Nacional de Seniores	30	0	0	0	—		—		30	0
Gondomar	Total		113	3	1	0	—		—		114	3
Mafra	2015–16	LigaPro	37	0	0	0	0	0	—		37	0
Estoril	2016–17	Primeira Liga	27	0	2	0	0	0	—		29	0
Estoril	2017–18	Primeira Liga	15	0	0	0	1	0	—		16	0
Estoril	Total		42	0	2	0	1	0	—		45	0
Académica	2018–19	LigaPro	18	0	0	0	0	0	—		18	0
Mafra	2019–20	LigaPro	24	5	2	1	1	0	—		27	6
Arouca	2020–21	Liga Portugal 2	22	0	1	0	0	0	2 (Note: Appearances in promotion play-offs)	0	25	0
Arouca	2021–22	Primeira Liga	1	0	1	0	2	0	—		4	0
Arouca	Total		23	0	2	0	2	0	2	0	29	0
Chaves	2021–22	Liga Portugal 2	1	0	0	0	0	0	0	0	1	0
Chaves	2022–23	Primeira Liga	0	0	0	0	0	0	—		0	0
Chaves	Total		1	0	0	0	0	0	0	0	1	0
Leixões	2022–23	Liga Portugal 2	24	0	3	0	2	0	—		29	0
Leixões	2023–24	Liga Portugal 2	0	0	0	0	0	0	—		0	0
Leixões	Total		24	0	3	0	2	0	—		29	0
Trofense	2023–24	Liga 3	8	0	0	0	—		—		8	0
Trofense	2024–25	Liga 3	26	1	0	0	—		—		26	1
Trofense	Total		34	1	0	0	—		—		34	1
Career total			316	9	10	1	6	0	2	0	334	10
