= Brendon Lucas =

Brazilian footballer

Personal information
- Full name: Brendon Lucas da Silva Estevam
- Date of birth: 29 May 1995 (age 31)
- Place of birth: Brasília, Brazil
- Height: 1.88 m (6 ft 2 in)
- Position: Centre-back

Team information
- Current team: Uttaradit

Youth career
- Anápolis
- –2015: Palmeiras

Senior career*
Years	Team	Apps	(Gls)
2015–2016	Anápolis	2	(0)
2016	→ Grêmio Anápolis (loan)		
2017–2021	Portimonense	11	(0)
2017–2019	→ Académica (loan)	35	(3)
2019–2020	→ Sporting Covilhã (loan)	24	(1)
2020–2021	→ Leixões (loan)	27	(0)
2021–2022	Ho Chi Minh City	21	(0)
2023	Argeș Pitești	8	(0)
2023–2024	Ho Chi Minh City	30	(1)
2024–2025	Persik Kediri	19	(1)
2025	Al-Fahaheel	0	(0)
2026	Joinville	6	(0)
2026–	Uttaradit	0	(0)
- * Club domestic league appearances and goals as of 18 May 2026

Brendon Lucas da Silva Estevam (born 29 May 1995) is a Brazilian professional football player who plays as a centre-back for Thai League 2 club Uttaradit.

== Club career ==
Brendon made his professional debut in the Segunda Liga for Portimonense on 28 January 2017 in a game against União da Madeira.

In June 2017, he joined Académica.

== Honours ==
Portimonense

- LigaPro: 2016–17
