= Sunday Abalo =

Nigerian footballer (born 1995)

Personal information
- Full name: Sunday Divine Abalo
- Date of birth: 14 May 1995 (age 31)
- Place of birth: Lagos, Nigeria
- Height: 1.80 m (5 ft 11 in)
- Position: Defensive midfielder

Team information
- Current team: Lusitano
- Number: 6

Youth career
- 2013–2014: Rio Ave

Senior career*
Years	Team	Apps	(Gls)
2014–2017	Rio Ave	7	(0)
2016–2017	→ Leixões (loan)	34	(1)
2017–2019	Rio Ave B	23	(1)
2018	→ Covilhã (loan)	11	(1)
2019–	Lusitano	14	(1)
- * Club domestic league appearances and goals as of 19:02, 22 March 2020 (UTC)

Sunday Divine Abalo born 14 May 1995) is a Nigerian footballer who plays as a defensive midfielder for Lusitano.
