= Daniel Costa (Portuguese footballer) =

Portuguese footballer

Dani Costa
Personal information
- Full name: Daniel Costa
- Date of birth: 1 September 2000 (age 26)
- Place of birth: Portugal
- Height: 1.81 m (5 ft 11 in)
- Position: Forward

Youth career
- –2011: Anadia
- 2011–2012: Casa do Benfica de Estarreja
- Sporting Toronto
- 2014–2017: Anadia
- 2017–2019: Académica

Senior career*
Years	Team	Apps	(Gls)
2019–2022	Académica	21	(0)
- * Club domestic league appearances and goals as of 22 January 2022

Daniel 'Dani' Costa (born 1 September 2000) is a Portuguese footballer who plays as a forward.

== Career ==
On 27 July 2019, Dani made his professional debut with Académica de Coimbra in a 2019–20 Taça da Liga match against Farense.
