= Hwang Mun-ki =

South Korean footballer (born 1996)

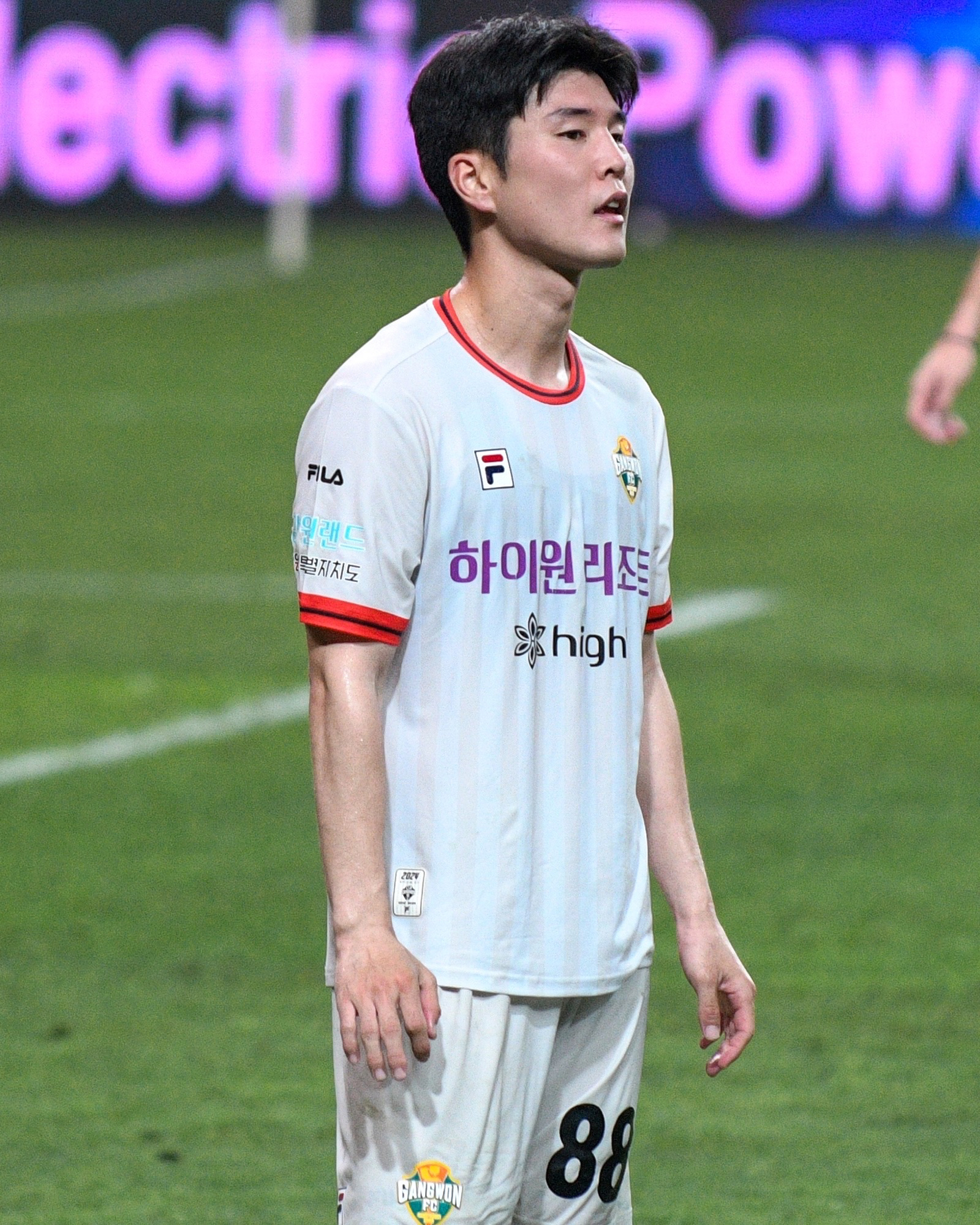
- Ki with Gangwon FC in 2024

Personal information
- Date of birth: 8 December 1996 (age 29)
- Place of birth: Anyang, South Korea
- Height: 1.76 m (5 ft 9 in)
- Positions: Midfielder; right-back

Team information
- Current team: Pyeongchang United
- Number: 88

Youth career
- 2014–2015: Académica

Senior career*
Years	Team	Apps	(Gls)
2015–2020	Académica	59	(1)
2020–2021	FC Anyang	18	(2)
2021–	Gangwon FC	120	(6)
2025–	→ Pyeongchang United (draft)	18	(1)

International career^{‡}
2012	South Korea U17	3	(0)
2024–	South Korea	2	(0)
Korean name
Hangul	황문기
Hanja	黃文基
RR	Hwang Mungi
MR	Hwang Mun'gi
- * Club domestic league appearances and goals as of 1 November 2025 ‡ National team caps and goals as of 10 September 2024

Hwang Mun-ki (Korean: 황문기; born 8 December 1996), simply known as Ki, is a South Korean professional footballer who plays as a midfielder or right-back for Pyeongchang United and the South Korea national team.

== Club career ==
At Portuguese club Académica de Coimbra, Ki made his professional debut in a Taça da Liga match against Marítimo on 16 September 2015, and made his Primeira Liga debut against Tondela on 14 May 2016. After Académica was relegated to LigaPro, Ki played as a multipurpose midfielder for the senior team in earnest. During five years at Académica, he played in 65 matches including 58 LigaPro matches.

== International career ==
Ki made his debut for the South Korea national team on 5 September 2024 in a World Cup qualifier against Palestine at the Seoul World Cup Stadium. He started the game and played 67 minutes as the game ended in a scoreless draw.

== Career statistics ==
=== Club ===
As of 1 November 2025

Appearances and goals by club, season and competition
Club	Season	League			National cup		League cup		Other		Total	
Club	Season	Division	Apps	Goals	Apps	Goals	Apps	Goals	Apps	Goals	Apps	Goals
Académica	2015–16	Primeira Liga	1	0	0	0	1	0	—		2	0
Académica	2016–17	LigaPro	19	1	0	0	0	0	—		19	1
Académica	2017–18	LigaPro	17	0	1	0	1	0	—		19	0
Académica	2018–19	LigaPro	9	0	0	0	1	0	—		10	0
Académica	2019–20	LigaPro	13	0	0	0	2	0	—		15	0
Académica	Total		59	1	1	0	5	0	0	0	65	1
FC Anyang	2020	K League 2	18	2	0	0	—		—		18	2
Gangwon FC	2021	K League 1	30	1	1	0	—		2 (Note: Appearances in K League promotion-relegation play-offs)	1	33	2
Gangwon FC	2022	K League 1	34	3	1	0	—		—		35	3
Gangwon FC	2023	K League 1	20	0	1	0	—		2	0	23	0
Gangwon FC	2024	K League 1	36	2	0	0	—		—		36	2
Gangwon FC	Total		120	6	3	0	—		4	1	127	7
Pyeongchang United (draft)	2025	K4 League	18	1	2	0	—		—		20	1
Career total			215	10	6	0	5	0	4	1	230	11

== Honours ==
Individual

- K League All-Star: 2024
- K League 1 Best XI: 2024
