= 2019–20 S.L. Benfica season =

Benfica
2019–20 season
- President: Luís Filipe Vieira
- Head coach: Bruno Lage (until 29 June 2020); Nélson Veríssimo (caretaker)
- Stadium: Estádio da Luz
- Primeira Liga: 2nd
- Taça de Portugal: Runners-up
- Taça da Liga: Third round
- Supertaça Cândido de Oliveira: Winners
- UEFA Champions League: Group stage
- UEFA Europa League: Round of 32
- Top goalscorer: League: Carlos Vinícius (19); All: Pizzi (30)
- Highest home attendance: 62,956 v Paços de Ferreira (10 August 2019)
- Lowest home attendance: 37,044 v Vitória de Guimarães (25 September 2019)
- Average home league attendance: 39,359
- Biggest win: Benfica 5–0 Sporting CP (4 August 2019); Benfica 5–0 Paços de Ferreira (10 August 2019)
- Biggest defeat: 2 goal difference in 4 matches
Home colours	Away colours

The 2019–20 Sport Lisboa e Benfica season was the club's 116th season in existence and its 86th consecutive season in the top flight of Portuguese football. It started with a 5–0 win over Sporting CP in the Supertaça Cândido de Oliveira, on 4 August 2019, and concluded with a 2–1 loss to FC Porto in the Taça de Portugal final, on 1 August 2020.

== Players ==
=== First-team squad ===
As of 1 May 2026

Note: Flags indicate national team as defined under FIFA eligibility rules; some limited exceptions apply. Players may hold more than one non-FIFA nationality.

No.	Pos.	Nation	Player
1	GK	BEL	Mile Svilar
2	DF	ARG	Germán Conti
3	DF	ESP	Álex Grimaldo
6	DF	POR	Rúben Dias
8	MF	BRA	Gabriel
11	MF	ARG	Franco Cervi
14	FW	SUI	Haris Seferovic
17	MF	SRB	Andrija Živković
19	MF	POR	Chiquinho
20	FW	POR	Dyego Sousa
21	MF	POR	Pizzi
22	MF	GRE	Andreas Samaris
23	DF	NGR	Tyronne Ebuehi
27	MF	POR	Rafa Silva

No.	Pos.	Nation	Player
28	MF	GER	Julian Weigl
33	DF	BRA	Jardel (captain)
34	DF	POR	André Almeida (vice-captain)
38	DF	BRA	Morato
49	MF	MAR	Adel Taarabt
61	MF	POR	Florentino Luis
71	DF	POR	Nuno Tavares
72	GK	RUS	Ivan Zlobin
73	FW	POR	Jota
84	DF	POR	Tomás Tavares
88	FW	POR	Gonçalo Ramos
92	MF	POR	David Tavares
95	FW	BRA	Carlos Vinicius
97	DF	POR	Ferro
99	GK	GRE	Odysseas Vlachodimos

== Coaching staff ==
Position	Name
Head coach	Nélson Veríssimo
Assistant coaches	Minervino Pietra; Marco Pedroso
Goalkeeping coach	Fernando Ferreira
Observer assistant coach	Marco Pedroso
Video analyst	Jhony Conceição

Last updated: 3 July 2020

== Pre-season friendlies ==
On 15 June 2019, Benfica announced their pre-season schedule, which included the following matches: Win Draw Loss

10 July 2019 Friendly	Benfica	1–2	Anderlecht	Lisbon, Portugal
20:30 WEST	Chiquinho 69'	Report	Vlap 34'; Thelin 40'	Stadium: Estádio da Luz; Attendance: 55,979; Referee: Fábio Veríssimo (Leiria)

13 July 2019 Taça Hospital da Luz	Académica	0–8	Benfica	Coimbra, Portugal
20:15 WEST	Reko (yellow card) 59'	Report	Silva 23'; De Tomás 24', 45+6'; Gabriel (yellow card) 31'; Conti 51', 85'; Pizzi 60'; Seferovic 62'; Taarabt 89'	Stadium: Estádio Cidade de Coimbra; Attendance: 17,350; Referee: Vítor Ferreira (Braga)

20 July 2019 International Champions Cup	Benfica	3–0	Guadalajara	Santa Clara, California, United States
13:05 PDT	De Tomás 4' (yellow card) 61'; Gabriel (yellow card) 41'; Silva 70'; Seferovic 73'; Fejsa (yellow card) 85'	Report	González (yellow card) 37'; Villalpando (yellow card) 55'	Stadium: Levi's Stadium; Attendance: 15,724; Referee: Joseph Dickerson (United States)

24 July 2019 International Champions Cup	Fiorentina	1–2	Benfica	Harrison, New Jersey, United States
20:05 EDT	Vlahović 29'; Ranieri (yellow card) 50'; Biraghi (yellow card) 67'	Report	Seferovic 9'; Dias (yellow card) 39'; Silva (yellow card) 48'; Gabriel (yellow card) 57'; Caio 90+3'	Stadium: Red Bull Arena; Attendance: 12,141; Referee: Robert Sibiga (United States)

28 July 2019 International Champions Cup	Milan	0–1	Benfica	Foxborough, Massachusetts, United States
15:05 EDT	Musacchio (yellow card) 38'	Report	Pizzi (yellow card) 38'; Fejsa (yellow card) 65'; Taarabt 70'	Stadium: Gillette Stadium; Attendance: 27,565; Referee: Sorin Stoica (United States)

Benfica won the International Champions Cup.

== Competitions ==
=== Overall record ===
Competition	First match	Last match	Starting round	Final position	Record							
Competition	First match	Last match	Starting round	Final position	Pld	W	D	L	GF	GA	GD	Win %
Primeira Liga	4 September 2019	25 July 2020	Matchday 1	2nd	34	24	5	5	71	26	+45	70.59
Taça de Portugal	18 October 2019	1 August 2020	Third round	Runners-up	7	5	1	1	16	9	+7	71.43
Taça da Liga	25 September 2019	21 December 2019	Third round	Third round	3	0	3	0	3	3	+0	0.00
Supertaça Cândido de Oliveira	4 August 2019		Final	Winners	1	1	0	0	5	0	+5	100.00
UEFA Champions League	17 September 2019	10 December 2019	Group stage	Group stage	6	2	1	3	10	11	−1	33.33
UEFA Europa League	20 February 2020	27 February 2020	Round of 32	Round of 32	2	0	1	1	4	5	−1	0.00
Total					53	32	11	10	109	54	+55	60.38

Last updated: 1 August 2020

=== Supertaça Cândido de Oliveira ===
4 August 2019	Benfica	5–0	Sporting CP	Faro/Loulé
20:45 WEST (UTC+01:00)	Silva 40'; Grimaldo (yellow card) 46' (goal) 64'; Dias (yellow card) 47'; Ferro (yellow card) 50'; Pizzi 60', 75'; Seferovic (yellow card) 70'; De Tomás (yellow card) 72'; Chiquinho 90'	Report	Acuña (yellow card) 20'; Doumbia (yellow card) 32' (yellow-red card) 89'; Raphinha (yellow card) 49'; Fernandes (yellow card) 62'; Coates (yellow card) 62'	Stadium: Estádio Algarve; Attendance: 28,636; Referee: Nuno Almeida (Algarve); Man of the Match: Pizzi

=== Primeira Liga ===
==== League table ====
Pos	Team	Pld	W	D	L	GF	GA	GD	Pts	Qualification or relegation
1	Porto (C)	34	26	4	4	74	22	+52	82	Qualification for the Champions League group stage
2	Benfica	34	24	5	5	71	26	+45	77	Qualification for the Champions League third qualifying round
3	Braga	34	18	6	10	61	40	+21	60 (Note: Head-to-head away goals: Braga 1, Sporting 0)	Qualification for the Europa League group stage (Note: Since the winners of the 2019–20 Taça de Portugal, Porto, qualified for the Champions League based on league position, the spot awarded to the third-placed team (Europa League third qualifying round) was passed to the fourth-placed team, and the spot awarded to the fourth-placed team (Europa League second qualifying round) was passed to the fifth-placed team.)
4	Sporting CP	34	18	6	10	49	34	+15	60	Qualification for the Europa League third qualifying round
5	Rio Ave	34	15	10	9	48	36	+12	55	Qualification for the Europa League second qualifying round

Source: Liga Portugal
Rules for classification: 1) Points; 2) Head-to-head points; 3) Head-to-head goal difference; 4) Head-to-head away goals scored; 5) Goal difference; 6) Matches won; 7) Goals scored; 8) Play-off.
(C) Champions

==== Results summary ====
Overall								Home						Away					
Pld	W	D	L	GF	GA	GD	Pts	W	D	L	GF	GA	GD	W	D	L	GF	GA	GD
34	24	5	5	71	26	+45	77	12	2	3	38	13	+25	12	3	2	33	13	+20

Last updated: 25 July 2020.
Source: Liga Portugal

==== Results by round ====
Round	1	2	3	4	5	6	7	8	9	10	11	12	13	14	15	16	17	18	19	20	21	22	23	24	25	26	27	28	29	30	31	32	33	34
Ground	H	A	H	A	H	A	H	A	H	H	A	H	A	H	A	H	A	A	H	A	H	A	H	A	H	A	A	H	A	H	A	H	A	H
Result	W	W	L	W	W	W	W	W	W	W	W	W	W	W	W	W	W	W	W	L	L	W	D	D	D	D	W	L	L	W	D	W	W	W
Position	1	1	3	2	2	2	2	2	1	1	1	1	1	1	1	1	1	1	1	1	1	1	2	2	2	2	2	2	2	2	2	2	2	2
Points	3	6	6	9	12	15	18	21	24	27	30	33	36	39	42	45	48	51	54	54	54	57	58	59	60	61	64	64	64	67	68	71	74	77

Source: Liga Portugal
A = Away; H = Home; W = Win; D = Draw; L = Loss

==== Matches ====
10 August 2019 1	Benfica	5–0	Paços de Ferreira	Lisbon
21:30 WEST (UTC+01:00)	Nuno Tavares 26'; Pizzi 31' (pen.) 74'; Seferovic 70'; Vinícius 84'	Report	Baixinho (yellow card) 9'; Douglas (yellow card) 35'; Bernardo (yellow card) 48' (yellow-red card) 65'	Stadium: Estádio da Luz; Attendance: 62,956; Referee: Manuel Oliveira (Porto)

17 August 2019 2	Belenenses SAD	0–2	Benfica	Lisbon
19:00 WEST (UTC+01:00)	Lucca (yellow card) 4'; Eduardo Kau (yellow card) 34'; Kikas (yellow card) 50'; Matija (yellow card) 65'; André Santos (yellow card) 68'; Licá (yellow card) 83'; Calila (yellow card) 90+5'	Report	Nuno Tavares (yellow card) 40'; Silva 59'; Pizzi 90+2'	Stadium: Estádio Nacional; Attendance: 17,821; Referee: Fábio Veríssimo (Leiria)

24 August 2019 3	Benfica	0–2	Porto	Lisbon
19:00 WEST (UTC+01:00)	Taarabt (yellow card) 80'; Seferovic (yellow card) 83'	Report	Zé Luís 22' (yellow card) 72'; Marchesín (yellow card) 41'; Danilo (yellow card) 64'; Luis Díaz (yellow card) 80'; Alex Telles (yellow card) 83'; Marega 86'	Stadium: Estádio da Luz; Attendance: 62,735; Referee: Jorge Sousa (Porto)

1 September 2019 4	Braga	0–4	Benfica	Braga
21:00 WEST (UTC+01:00)	Hassan (yellow card) 23'; Sequeira (yellow card) 78'	Report	Pizzi 25' (pen.) 47'; Taarabt (yellow card) 45+1'; Bruno Viana 51' (o.g.); Esgaio 73' (o.g.)	Stadium: Estádio Municipal de Braga; Attendance: 15,499; Referee: Nuno Almeida (Algarve)

14 September 2019 5	Benfica	2–0	Gil Vicente	Lisbon
19:00 WEST (UTC+01:00)	Nogueira 45' (o.g.); Pizzi 53'; Jota (yellow card) 90'	Report	Nogueira (yellow card) 30'; Kraev (yellow card) 46'; Soares (yellow card) 78'; Baraye (yellow card) 80'	Stadium: Estádio da Luz; Attendance: 54,706; Referee: João Pinheiro (Braga)

21 September 2019 6	Moreirense	1–2	Benfica	Moreira de Cónegos
19:30 WEST (UTC+01:00)	Pacheco (yellow card) 19'; Aouacheria (yellow card) 38'; Singh 47'; Nenê (yellow card) 67'	Report	Almeida (yellow card) 31'; Taarabt (yellow card) 79'; Silva 85'; Seferovic 90+1'	Stadium: Parque de Jogos Comendador Joaquim de Almeida Freitas; Attendance: 4,220; Referee: Artur Soares Dias (Porto)

28 September 2019 7	Benfica	1–0	Vitória de Setúbal	Lisbon
19:00 WEST (UTC+01:00)	Fejsa (yellow card) 34'; Seferovic (yellow card) 45+2'; Carlos Vinícius 63'; Grimaldo (yellow card) 66'; Taarabt (red card) 80'; Vlachodimos (yellow card) 82'	Report	Pereira (yellow card) 12'; Semedo (yellow card) 61'; Mansilla (yellow card) 70'; Hachadi (yellow card) 73'	Stadium: Estádio da Luz; Attendance: 53,115; Referee: Tiago Martins (Lisbon)

27 October 2019 8	Tondela	0–1	Benfica	Tondela
15:00 WET (UTC±00:00)	João Pedro (yellow card) 90+2'	Report	Ferro 19'; Florentino (yellow card) 27'; Almeida (yellow card) 85'	Stadium: Estádio João Cardoso; Attendance: 4,705; Referee: Hugo Miguel (Lisbon)

30 October 2019 9	Benfica	4–0	Portimonense	Lisbon
20:15 WET (UTC±00:00)	Almeida 16' (yellow card) 53'; Dias 46'; Vinícius 62', 64'	Report	Lucas Fernandes (yellow card) 27'	Stadium: Estádio da Luz; Attendance: 42,037; Referee: Manuel Mota (Braga)

2 November 2019 10	Benfica	2–0	Rio Ave	Lisbon
18:00 WET (UTC±00:00)	Cervi (yellow card) 29'; Dias 32'; Pizzi 51'	Report	A. Santos (yellow card) 35'; N. Santos (yellow card) 45+1'; Tarantini (footballer) (yellow card) 63'	Stadium: Estádio da Luz; Attendance: 53,579; Referee: Carlos Xistra (Castelo Branco)

9 November 2019 11	Santa Clara	1–2	Benfica	Ponta Delgada
17:00 WET (UTC−01:00)	Carlos 17' (yellow card) 45+3'; Zé Manuel (yellow card) 57'; Ramos (yellow card) 69'	Report	Jardel (yellow card) 46'; Vinícius 54'; Gabriel (yellow card) 72'; Pizzi 78'; Taarabt (yellow card) 86'	Stadium: Estádio de São Miguel; Attendance: 8,309; Referee: Artur Soares Dias (Porto)

30 November 2019 12	Benfica	4–0	Marítimo	Lisbon
18:00 WET (UTC±00:00)	Pizzi 9'; Vinícius 17', 55'; Gabriel (yellow card) 27' (yellow-red card) 60'; Ferro (yellow card) 28'; Grolli 31' (o.g.)	Report	Renê (yellow card) 30'; Costa (yellow card) 58'	Stadium: Estádio da Luz; Attendance: 52,772; Referee: Fábio Veríssimo (Leiria)

6 December 2019 13	Boavista	1–4	Benfica	Porto
20:30 WET (UTC±00:00)	Obiora (yellow card) 30'; Stojiljković 44' (yellow card) 45+3'; Ra. Costa (yellow card) 54'; Reisinho (yellow card) 90+2'	Report	Cervi (yellow card) 9' (goal) 54'; Vinícius 35', 62'; Tavares (yellow card) 48'; Dias (yellow card) 54'; Gabriel 90+3'; Ferro (yellow card) 90+4'	Stadium: Estádio do Bessa; Attendance: 18,044; Referee: Jorge Sousa (Porto)

14 December 2019 14	Benfica	4–0	Famalicão	Lisbon
18:00 WET (UTC±00:00)	Vinícius 39'; Pizzi 48', 63'; Caio 89'	Report	Martins (yellow card) 2'; Riccieli (yellow card) 45'	Stadium: Estádio da Luz; Attendance: 51,721; Referee: Rui Costa (Porto)

4 January 2020 15	Vitória de Guimarães	0–1	Benfica	Guimarães
20:30 WET (UTC±00:00)	Evangelista (yellow card) 31'; Teixeira (yellow card) 57'; Rochinha (yellow card) 89' (yellow-red card) 90+5'	Report	Cervi 23'; Tavares (yellow card) 42'; Gabriel (yellow card) 52'; Taarabt (yellow card) 90+8'	Stadium: Estádio D. Afonso Henriques; Attendance: 27,291; Referee: Nuno Almeida (Algarve)

10 January 2020 16	Benfica	2–1	Aves	Lisbon
19:00 WET (UTC±00:00)	Chiquinho (yellow card) 23'; Almeida (yellow card) 52' (goal) 89'; Vinícius (yellow card) 72'; Pizzi 76' (pen.); Ferro (yellow card) 90+5'	Report	Yamga (yellow card) 12'; Mohammadi 20'; Banjaqui (yellow card) 44'	Stadium: Estádio da Luz; Attendance: 50,760; Referee: Carlos Xistra (Castelo Branco)

17 January 2020 17	Sporting CP	0–2	Benfica	Lisbon
21:15 WET (UTC±00:00)	Acuña (yellow card) 30'; Phellype (yellow card) 57'; Plata (yellow card) 90'; Mathieu (yellow card) 90+3'	Report	Gabriel (yellow card) 26'; Chiquinho (yellow card) 58'; Silva 80', 90+9'; Cervi (yellow card) 90+5'; Vlachodimos (yellow card) 90+9'	Stadium: Estádio José Alvalade; Attendance: 41,017; Referee: Hugo Miguel (Lisbon)

26 January 2020 18	Paços de Ferreira	0–2	Benfica	Paços de Ferreira
17:30 WET (UTC±00:00)	Douglas (yellow card) 25'; Micael (yellow card) 38'; Jorge Silva (yellow card) 71'	Report	Silva 39' (yellow card) 89'; Weigl (yellow card) 40'; Vinícius 47'	Stadium: Estádio da Mata Real; Attendance: 9,146; Referee: Manuel Oliveira (Porto)

31 January 2020 19	Benfica	3–2	Belenenses SAD	Lisbon
19:00 WET (UTC±00:00)	Pizzi (yellow card) 19'; Vinícius 31'; Taarabt 38'; Chiquinho 78'; Silva (yellow card) 85'	Report	Varela (yellow card) 11'; Esgaio (yellow card) 42'; Show (yellow card) 60'; G. Silva (yellow card) 69'; Licá 70', 87' (pen.)	Stadium: Estádio da Luz; Attendance: 45,134; Referee: Nuno Almeida (Algarve)

8 February 2020 20	Porto	3–2	Benfica	Porto
20:30 WET (UTC±00:00)	Oliveira 10' (yellow card) 84'; Otávio (yellow card) 27'; Soares (yellow card) 38'; Telles 38' (pen.); Dias 44' (o.g.); Marchesín (yellow card) 86'	Report	Vinícius 18', 50'; Taarabt (yellow card) 27'; Weigl (yellow card) 30'; Ferro (yellow card) 37'; Pizzi (yellow card) 45+4'; Vlachodimos (yellow card) 64'	Stadium: Estádio do Dragão; Attendance: 49,227; Referee: Artur Soares Dias (Porto)

15 February 2020 21	Benfica	0–1	Braga	Lisbon
18:00 WET (UTC±00:00)	Dias (yellow card) 45+1'; Taarabt (yellow card) 56'	Report	Carmo (yellow card) 21'; Palhinha (yellow card) 35' (goal) 45+1'; R. Silva (yellow card) 45+1' (yellow-red card) 90+6'; Esgaio (yellow card) 54'; Wallace (yellow card) 74'	Stadium: Estádio da Luz; Attendance: 59,371; Referee: Hugo Miguel (Lisbon)

24 February 2020 22	Gil Vicente	0–1	Benfica	Barcelos
19:30 WET (UTC±00:00)	Nogueira (yellow card) 86'	Report	Vinícius 15'; Dias (yellow card) 17'	Stadium: Estádio Cidade de Barcelos; Attendance: 11,986; Referee: Luís Godinho (Porto)

2 March 2020 23	Benfica	1–1	Moreirense	Lisbon
20:45 WET (UTC±00:00)	Samaris (yellow card) 56'; Pizzi 90+1'	Report	Soares (yellow card) 55'; Abreu 67'; Pasinato (yellow card) 90+1'; Machado (yellow card) 90+1'	Stadium: Estádio da Luz; Attendance: 40,861; Referee: Fábio Veríssimo (Leiria)

7 March 2020 24	Vitória de Setúbal	1–1	Benfica	Setúbal
18:00 WET (UTC±00:00)	Carlinhos 46'; Semedo (yellow card) 50'; Mansilla (yellow card) 54'; Artur Jorge (yellow card) 75'; Valente (yellow card) 84'	Report	Pizzi 51' (pen.); Tavares (yellow card) 61'; Samaris (yellow card) 68'; Silva (yellow card) 77'	Stadium: Estádio do Bonfim; Attendance: 9,152; Referee: João Pinheiro (Braga)

4 June 2020 25	Benfica	0–0	Tondela	Lisbon
19:15 WEST (UTC+01:00)	Taarabt (yellow card) 64'	Report		Stadium: Estádio da Luz; Attendance: 0 Referee: Manuel Mota (Braga)

10 June 2020 26	Portimonense	2–2	Benfica	Portimão
19:15 WEST (UTC+01:00)	Willyan (yellow card) 45'; Fali (yellow card) 52'; Dener 66'; Possignolo (yellow card) 73'; Júnior Tavares 76'; Beto (yellow card) 86'; Hackman (yellow card) 86'	Report	Pizzi 18'; Almeida 31' (yellow card) 57'; Weigl (yellow card) 57'; Gabriel (yellow card) 86'	Stadium: Estádio Municipal de Portimão; Attendance: 0 Referee: Carlos Xistra (Castelo Branco)

17 June 2020 27	Rio Ave	1–2	Benfica	Vila do Conde
21:15 WEST (UTC+01:00)	Elmusrati (yellow card) 13' (yellow-red card) 62'; Taremi 26'; Santos (red card) 72'; Figueiras (yellow card) 80'	Report	Pizzi (yellow card) 45+3'; Seferovic 64'; Dias (yellow card) 74'; Weigl 87'	Stadium: Estádio dos Arcos; Attendance: 0 Referee: Luís Godinho (Porto)

23 June 2020 28	Benfica	3–4	Santa Clara	Lisbon
19:15 WEST (UTC+01:00)	Gabriel (yellow card) 31'; Silva 50'; Vinícius 63', 65'; Dias (yellow card) 81'	Report	Carvalho (yellow card) 17' (goal) 44'; Sanusi 57'; Crysan 81' (pen.); Zé Manuel 90+5'	Stadium: Estádio da Luz; Attendance: 0 Referee: João Pinheiro (Braga)

29 June 2020 29	Marítimo	2–0	Benfica	Funchal
18:00 WEST (UTC+01:00)	China (yellow card) 45'; Kerkez (yellow card) 61'; Pinho (yellow card) 64' (goal) 78'; Correa 74'	Report	Almeida (yellow card) 32'	Stadium: Estádio do Marítimo; Attendance: 0 Referee: Hélder Malheiro (Lisbon)

4 July 2020 30	Benfica	3–1	Boavista	Lisbon
21:15 WEST (UTC+01:00)	Almeida 13'; Pizzi 31'; Gabriel 42'; Tavares (yellow card) 63'	Report	Cassiano (yellow card) 40'; Obiora (yellow card) 62'; Dulanto 64'	Stadium: Estádio da Luz; Attendance: 0 Referee: Fábio Veríssimo (Leiria)

9 July 2020 31	Famalicão	1–1	Benfica	Vila Nova de Famalicão
21:30 WEST (UTC+01:00)	Roderick (yellow card) 39'; Gonçalves (yellow card) 45+1'; Guga 84'	Report	Cervi (yellow card) 7'; Weigl (yellow card) 24'; Pizzi 37'; Gabriel (yellow card) 57'	Stadium: Estádio Municipal 22 de Junho; Attendance: 0 Referee: Jorge Sousa (Porto)

14 July 2020 32	Benfica	2–0	Vitória de Guimarães	Lisbon
21:30 WEST (UTC+01:00)	Weigl (yellow card) 22'; Chiquinho 37'; Almeida (yellow card) 79'; Seferovic 87'	Report		Stadium: Estádio da Luz; Attendance: 0 Referee: Hugo Miguel (Lisbon)

21 July 2020 33	Aves	0–4	Benfica	Aves
21:15 WEST (UTC+01:00)	Morais (yellow card) 50'	Report	Silva 4'; Pizzi 52' (pen.); Ramos 87', 90+3'	Stadium: Estádio do CD Aves; Attendance: 0 Referee: António Nobre (Porto)

25 July 2020 34	Benfica	2–1	Sporting CP	Lisbon
16:00 WEST (UTC+01:00)	Dias (yellow card) 20'; Gabriel (yellow card) 22'; Seferovic 28'; Almeida (yellow card) 70'; Vinícius 88' (yellow card) 90+4'	Report	Neto (yellow card) 36'; Šporar 69'; Cabral (yellow card) 71'; Wendel (yellow card) 77'	Stadium: Estádio da Luz; Attendance: 0 Referee: Fábio Veríssimo (Leiria)

=== Taça de Portugal ===
18 October 2019 Third round	Cova da Piedade	0–4	Benfica	Cova da Piedade
20:30 WEST (UTC+01:00)		Report	Pizzi 45+2', 49'; Vinícius 63', 90+2'; Gabriel (yellow card) 86'	Stadium: Estádio Municipal José Martins Vieira; Attendance: 2,250; Referee: António Nobre (Leiria)

23 November 2019 Fourth round	Vizela	1–2	Benfica	Vizela
20:45 WET (UTC±00:00)	Samu 6'; Ericson (yellow card) 21' (yellow-red card) 26'; João Pedro (yellow card) 54'	Report	Grimaldo (yellow card) 22'; Gabriel (yellow card) 33'; Pizzi (yellow card) 45'; De Tomás 70'; Vinícius 86'	Stadium: Estádio do FC Vizela; Referee: Hélder Malheiro

18 December 2019 Fifth round	Benfica	2–1	Braga	Lisbon
20:45 WET (UTC±00:00)	Pizzi 18' (yellow card) 41'; Grimaldo (yellow card) 24'; Vinícius (yellow card) 57' (goal) 63'; Dias (yellow card) 84'	Report	Ferro 14' (o.g.); Eduardo (yellow card) 26'; Fonte (yellow card) 41'; Wallace (yellow card) 57'	Stadium: Estádio da Luz; Referee: Artur Soares Dias (Porto)

14 January 2020 Quarter-finals	Benfica	3–2	Rio Ave	Lisbon
21:15 WET (UTC±00:00)	Dias (yellow card) 3'; Cervi 13'; Seferovic 65', 72'	Report	Piazon 4'; Augusto (yellow card) 21'; Taremi 30'; Lopes (yellow card) 51'	Stadium: Estádio da Luz; Referee: Artur Soares Dias (Porto)

4 February 2020 Semi-finals 1st leg	Benfica	3–2	Famalicão	Lisbon
19:15 WET (UTC±00:00)	Grimaldo (yellow card) 43'; Pizzi 53' (pen.); Silva 78'; Dias (yellow card) 90+1'; Gabriel 90+5'	Report	Assunção (yellow card) 13'; Gonçalves 60' (yellow card) 78'; Martins (yellow card) 65'; Martínez 73'	Stadium: Estádio da Luz; Referee: Hugo Miguel (Lisbon)

11 February 2020 Semi-finals 2nd leg	Famalicão	1–1 (3–4 agg.)	Benfica	Vila Nova de Famalicão
20:45 WET (UTC±00:00)	Račić (yellow card) 22'; Gonçalves (yellow card) 45+5'; Martins (yellow card) 71'; Martínez 78'; Coly (yellow card) 90+5'	Report	Pizzi 24'; Taarabt (yellow card) 28'; Cervi (yellow card) 60'; Tavares (yellow card) 63'; Vlachodimos (yellow card) 85'; Vinícius (yellow card) 90+1'	Stadium: Estádio Municipal 22 de Junho; Attendance: 0 Referee: Jorge Sousa (Porto)

1 August 2020 Final	Benfica	1–2	Porto	Coimbra
20:45 WEST (UTC+01:00)	Dias (yellow card) 12'; Jardel (yellow card) 44'; Weigl (yellow card) 47'; Vinícius (yellow card) 75' (goal) 84' (pen.)	Report	Luis Díaz (yellow card) 9' (yellow-red card) 38'; Mbemba 47', 59'; Telles (yellow card) 90'	Stadium: Estádio Cidade de Coimbra; Attendance: 0 Referee: Artur Soares Dias (Porto)

=== Taça da Liga ===
==== Third round ====
Pos	Team	Pld	W	D	L	GF	GA	GD	Pts	Qualification	GUI	BEN	SET	SCC
1	Vitória de Guimarães	3	2	1	0	5	0	+5	7	Advance to knockout phase	—	—	—	3–0
2	Benfica	3	0	3	0	3	3	0	3		0–0	—	—	—
3	Vitória de Setúbal	3	0	2	1	3	5	−2	2		0–2	2–2	—	—
4	Sporting da Covilhã	3	0	2	1	2	5	−3	2		—	1–1	1–1	—

Source: Liga Portugal
Rules for classification: Tiebreakers

25 September 2019 1	Benfica	0–0	Vitória de Guimarães	Lisbon
19:00 WEST (UTC+01:00)	Taarabt (yellow card) 74'	Report	Davidson (yellow card) 56'; Sacko (yellow card) 75'	Stadium: Estádio da Luz; Attendance: 37,507; Referee: Rui Costa (Porto)

3 December 2019 2	Sporting da Covilhã	1–1	Benfica	Covilhã
20:15 WET (UTC±00:00)	Gilberto (yellow card) 11'; Jean (yellow card) 24'; Bonani 46'; Bruno (yellow card) 74'	Report	Jota (yellow card) 41' (goal) 82'; Samaris (yellow card) 45'; Vinícius (yellow card) 63'	Stadium: Estádio José dos Santos Pinto; Attendance: 2,678; Referee: Rui Oliveira

21 December 2019 3	Vitória de Setúbal	2–2	Benfica	Setúbal
20:00 WET (UTC±00:00)	Semedo (yellow card) 43'; Guedes 83', 90+2' (yellow card) 90+2'	Report	Morato (yellow card) 47'; De Tomás 49'; Jota 73' (yellow card) 84'; Jardel (yellow card) 90+3'	Stadium: Estádio do Bonfim; Attendance: 4,084; Referee: Manuel Oliveira

=== UEFA Champions League ===
==== Group stage ====
Pos	Team	Pld	W	D	L	GF	GA	GD	Pts	Qualification	RBL	LYO	BEN	ZEN
1	(Germany) RB Leipzig	6	3	2	1	10	8	+2	11	Advance to knockout phase	—	0–2	2–2	2–1
2	(France) Lyon	6	2	2	2	9	8	+1	8	Advance to knockout phase	2–2	—	3–1	1–1
3	(Portugal) Benfica	6	2	1	3	10	11	−1	7 (Note: Tied on head-to-head points (3). Head-to-head goal difference: Benfica +1, Zenit Saint Petersburg −1.)	Transfer to Europa League	1–2	2–1	—	3–0
4	(Russia) Zenit Saint Petersburg	6	2	1	3	7	9	−2	7		0–2	2–0	3–1	—

Source: UEFA
Rules for classification: Group stage tiebreakers
Notes:

17 September 2019 1	Benfica (Portugal)	1–2	(Germany) RB Leipzig	Lisbon, Portugal
21:00 CEST (UTC+02:00)	Jota (yellow card) 62'; Haris Seferovic 84'	Report	Poulsen (yellow card) 57'; Werner 69', 78'; Haidara (yellow card) 70'	Stadium: Estádio da Luz; Attendance: 46,460; Referee: Anastasios Sidiropoulos (Greece)

2 October 2019 2	Zenit Saint Petersburg (Russia)	3–1	(Portugal) Benfica	Saint Petersburg, Russia
21:00 CEST (UTC+02:00)	Dzyuba 22'; Rakitskiy (yellow card) 44'; Dias 70' (o.g.); Azmoun 78'	Report	De Tomás 85'	Stadium: Krestovsky Stadium; Attendance: 51,683; Referee: Carlos del Cerro Grande (Spain)

23 October 2019 3	Benfica (Portugal)	2–1	(France) Lyon	Lisbon, Portugal
21:00 CEST (UTC+02:00)	Silva 4'; Pizzi (yellow card) 42' (goal) 86'; Fernandes (yellow card) 59'	Report	Marcelo (yellow card) 10'; Dembélé (yellow card) 26'; Koné (yellow card) 38'; Depay 70'	Stadium: Estádio da Luz; Attendance: 53,035; Referee: Ivan Kružliak (Slovakia)

5 November 2019 4	Lyon (France)	3–1	(Portugal) Benfica	Décines-Charpieu, France
21:00 CET (UTC+01:00)	Andersen 4'; Depay 33'; Traoré 89'	Report	Gabriel (yellow card) 43'; Florentino (yellow card) 50'; Seferovic 76'	Stadium: Parc Olympique Lyonnais; Attendance: 51,077; Referee: Björn Kuipers (Netherlands)

27 November 2019 5	RB Leipzig (Germany)	2–2	(Portugal) Benfica	Leipzig, Germany
21:00 CET (UTC+01:00)	Forsberg 90' (pen.), 90+6'	Report	Pizzi 20'; Taarabt (yellow card) 52'; Vinícius 59'; Dias (yellow card) 89'	Stadium: Red Bull Arena; Attendance: 38,339; Referee: Jesús Gil Manzano (Spain)

10 December 2019 6	Benfica (Portugal)	3–0	(Russia) Zenit Saint Petersburg	Lisbon, Portugal
21:00 CET (UTC+01:00)	Gabriel (yellow card) 19'; Cervi 47'; Pizzi 58' (pen.); Azmoun 79' (o.g.)	Report	Douglas (yellow card) 17' (yellow-red card) 56'; Yerokhin (yellow card) 43'; Ozdoyev (yellow card) 55'	Stadium: Estádio da Luz; Attendance: 40,232; Referee: Antonio Mateu Lahoz (Spain)

=== UEFA Europa League ===
==== Knockout phase ====
===== Round of 32 =====
20 February 2020 First leg	Shakhtar Donetsk (Ukraine)	2–1	(Portugal) Benfica	Kharkiv, Ukraine
21:00 CET (UTC+01:00)	Patrick 56'; Kovalenko 72'	Report	Pizzi 66' (pen.); Florentino (yellow card) 90+5'	Stadium: Metalist Stadium; Attendance: 24,429; Referee: Bobby Madden (Scotland)

27 February 2020 Second leg	Benfica (Portugal)	3–3 (4–5 agg.)	(Ukraine) Shakhtar Donetsk	Lisbon, Portugal
21:00 CET (UTC+01:00)	Pizzi 9'; Dias 36'; Silva 47' (yellow card) 50'	Report	Dias 12' (o.g.); Ismaily (yellow card) 43'; Stepanenko 49'; Patrick 71'; Taison (yellow card) 83'; Konoplyanka (yellow card) 87'	Stadium: Estádio da Luz; Attendance: 48,302; Referee: Björn Kuipers (Netherlands)

== Players ==
=== Appearances and goals ===
As of 25 July 2020

No.	Pos	Nat	Player	Total		Primeira Liga		Taça de Portugal		Taça da Liga		Supertaça		Champions League		Europa League	
No.	Pos	Nat	Player	Apps	Goals	Apps	Goals	Apps	Goals	Apps	Goals	Apps	Goals	Apps	Goals	Apps	Goals
Goalkeepers
1	GK	(Belgium) BEL	Mile Svilar	1	0	1	0	0	0	0	0	0	0	0	0	0	0
72	GK	(Russia) RUS	Ivan Zlobin	7	0	0	0	4	0	3	0	0	0	0	0	0	0
99	GK	(Greece) GRE	Odisseas Vlachodimos	44	0	33	0	2	0	0	0	1	0	6	0	2	0
Defenders
2	DF	(Argentina) ARG	Germán Conti	0	0	0	0	0	0	0	0	0	0	0	0	0	0
3	DF	(Spain) ESP	Álex Grimaldo	41	1	26	0	6	0	0	0	1	1	6	0	2	0
6	DF	(Portugal) POR	Rúben Dias	48	3	33	2	4	0	2	0	1	0	6	0	2	1
23	DF	(Nigeria) NGR	Tyronne Ebuehi	0	0	0	0	0	0	0	0	0	0	0	0	0	0
33	DF	(Brazil) BRA	Jardel	18	0	10	0	3	0	3	0	0	0	1+1	0	0	0
34	DF	(Portugal) POR	André Almeida	26	4	23	4	2	0	0	0	0	0	1	0	0	0
38	DF	(Brazil) BRA	Morato	1	0	0	0	0	0	1	0	0	0	0	0	0	0
71	DF	(Portugal) POR	Nuno Tavares	15	1	10+1	1	0	0	3	0	1	0	0	0	0	0
84	DF	(Portugal) POR	Tomás Tavares	26	0	9+3	0	4	0	3	0	0	0	5	0	2	0
97	DF	(Portugal) POR	Ferro	40	1	25+1	1	5+1	0	0	0	1	0	5	0	2	0
Midfielders
8	MF	(Brazil) BRA	Gabriel	33	3	19+3	2	4	1	0+1	0	1	0	5	0	0	0
11	MF	(Argentina) ARG	Franco Cervi	34	4	19+4	2	4+1	1	0	0	0	0	5	1	1	0
17	MF	(Serbia) SRB	Andrija Živković	4	0	0+3	0	0	0	1	0	0	0	0	0	0	0
19	MF	(Portugal) POR	Chiquinho	37	3	17+8	2	4+1	0	0+1	0	0+1	1	3	0	2	0
21	MF	(Portugal) POR	Pizzi	50	30	33+1	18	6	5	0+1	0	1	2	4+2	3	2	2
22	MF	(Greece) GRE	Andreas Samaris	25	0	8+8	0	2+3	0	2	0	0	0	0+1	0	0+1	0
27	MF	(Portugal) POR	Rafa Silva	35	11	18+7	7	1+2	1	0+1	0	1	1	2+1	1	1+1	1
28	MF	(Germany) GER	Julian Weigl	20	1	17+1	1	1	0	0	0	0	0	0	0	1	0
49	MF	(Morocco) MAR	Adel Taarabt	37	1	19+5	1	4	0	1+1	0	0+1	0	4	0	2	0
61	MF	(Portugal) POR	Florentino Luís	18	0	8+2	0	1+1	0	2	0	1	0	2	0	1	0
86	MF	(Portugal) POR	Tiago Dantas	1	0	0	0	0	0	0+1	0	0	0	0	0	0	0
88	MF	(Portugal) POR	Gonçalo Ramos	1	2	0+1	2	0	0	0	0	0	0	0	0	0	0
92	MF	(Portugal) POR	David Tavares	2	0	0	0	0	0	0+1	0	0	0	0+1	0	0	0
Forwards
14	FW	(Switzerland) SUI	Haris Seferovic	44	9	14+16	5	1+3	2	2	0	1	0	2+3	2	1+1	0
20	FW	(Portugal) POR	Dyego Sousa	12	0	1+10	0	0	0	0	0	0	0	0	0	1	0
73	FW	(Portugal) POR	Jota	27	2	1+18	0	1	0	3	2	0+1	0	1+1	0	0+1	0
95	FW	(Brazil) BRA	Carlos Vinícius	46	23	19+13	18	4+2	4	0+1	0	0	0	3+2	1	0+2	0
Players who made an appearance and/or had a squad number but left the team
5	MF	(Serbia) SRB	Ljubomir Fejsa	5	0	3	0	0	0	0	0	0	0	2	0	0	0
7	MF	(Brazil) BRA	Caio	11	1	0+4	1	1+1	0	2	0	0	0	0+3	0	0	0
83	MF	(Portugal) POR	Gedson Fernandes	13	0	2+5	0	0+1	0	3	0	0	0	2	0	0	0
9	FW	(Spain) ESP	Raúl de Tomás	17	3	6+1	0	2	1	2+1	1	1	0	1+3	1	0	0
26	FW	(Venezuela) VEN	Jhonder Cádiz	0	0	0	0	0	0	0	0	0	0	0	0	0	0
