= David Tavares =

Cape Verdean footballer (born 1999)

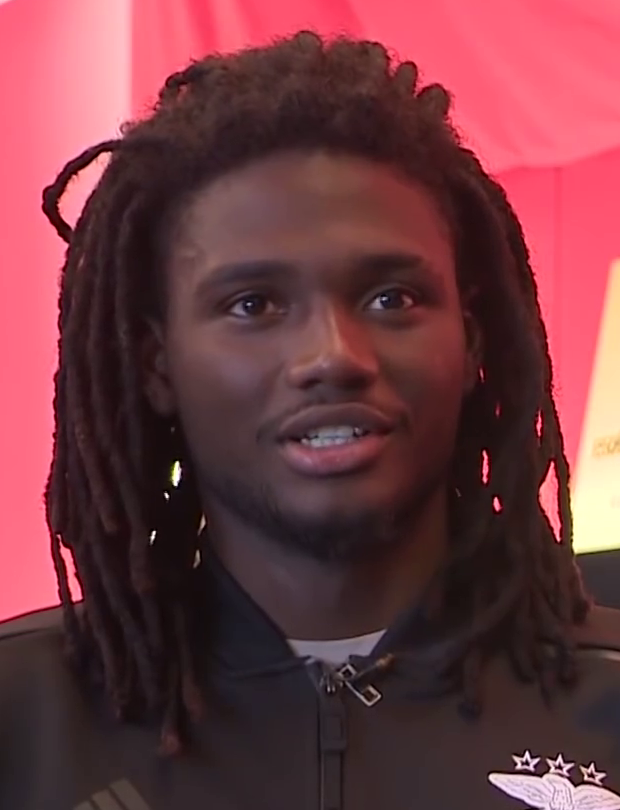
- Tavares being interviewed by Benfica TV in 2019

Personal information
- Full name: David José Gomes Oliveira Tavares
- Date of birth: 18 March 1999 (age 27)
- Place of birth: Lisbon, Portugal
- Height: 1.82 m (6 ft 0 in)
- Position: Midfielder

Team information
- Current team: Turan Tovuz
- Number: 8

Youth career
- 2009–2013: AC Tojal
- 2013–2014: Loures
- 2014–2016: Sporting CP
- 2016–2018: Benfica

Senior career*
Years	Team	Apps	(Gls)
2018–2021	Benfica B	36	(0)
2019–2021	Benfica	0	(0)
2020–2021	→ Moreirense (loan)	11	(0)
2021–2024	Famalicão	18	(0)
2023–2024	→ Torreense (loan)	5	(0)
2024–2025	Gloria Buzău	27	(1)
2025–	Turan Tovuz	6	(0)

International career^{‡}
2016	Portugal U17	3	(0)
2017	Portugal U18	2	(0)
2018	Portugal U19	4	(0)
2023–	Cape Verde	5	(0)
- * Club domestic league appearances and goals as of 22 June 2026 ‡ National team caps and goals as of 10 September 2024

David José Gomes Oliveira Tavares (born 18 March 1999) is a professional footballer who plays as a midfielder for Azerbaijan Premier League club Turan Tovuz. Born in Portugal, he plays for the Cape Verde national team.

== Club career ==
=== Benfica ===
Born in Lisbon of Cape Verdean descent, Tavares finished his youth career with S.L. Benfica after arriving from neighbours Sporting CP at the age of 17. He made his senior debut with the former's reserves in the LigaPro, his first match being on 16 March 2019 when he came on an 89th-minute substitute in a 2–1 home win against F.C. Penafiel.

Tavares made the first of two competitive appearances with the first team on 17 September 2019, replacing Jota midway through the second half of an eventual 1–2 home loss to RB Leipzig in the group stage of the UEFA Champions League. In September 2020, he joined Moreirense F.C. of the Primeira Liga in a season-long loan, playing his first game in the competition on 2 October in a 1–1 home draw with Boavista FC.

On 26 January 2021, Tavares was reinstated in the B side of his parent club, leaving Moreirense after allegedly falling out with manager Vasco Seabra.

=== Famalicão ===
On 29 June 2021, Tavares signed a five-year contract with F.C. Famalicão. He suffered a serious injury in December that sidelined him for several months, while in service of the under-23 side to where he had been sent due to disciplinary problems.

Tavares joined second-tier S.C.U. Torreense on 31 August 2023, loaned for one season.

=== Gloria Buzău ===
On 25 July 2024, Tavares agreed to a deal at FC Gloria Buzău in the Romanian Liga I. He scored his first goal as a senior the following 24 January, in the 3–0 home victory over AFC Unirea Slobozia; his side would be relegated at the end of the campaign in last place, and dissolved shortly after.

=== Later career ===
In June 2025, Tavares signed a three-year contract with Azerbaijan Premier League club Turan Tovuz.

== International career ==
Tavares represented Portugal at youth level. In March 2023, he was called to the Cape Verde national team for a double 2023 Africa Cup of Nations qualifier against Eswatini, but only made his debut on 12 June in a 0–0 friendly draw with Morocco.

== Career statistics ==
=== Club ===
As of match played 11 April 2025

Appearances and goals by club, season and competition
Club	Season	League			Cup		League Cup		Continental		Total	
Club	Season	Division	Apps	Goals	Apps	Goals	Apps	Goals	Apps	Goals	Apps	Goals
Benfica B	2018–19	LigaPro	8	0	—		—		—		8	0
Benfica B	2019–20	LigaPro	11	0	—		—		—		11	0
Benfica B	2020–21	Liga Portugal 2	17	0	—		—		—		17	0
Benfica B	Total		36	0	—		—		—		36	0
Benfica	2019–20	Primeira Liga	0	0	0	0	1	0	1 (Note: Appearance in UEFA Champions League)	0	2	0
Moreirense (loan)	2020–21	Primeira Liga	11	0	3	0	0	0	—		14	0
Famalicão	2021–22	Primeira Liga	13	0	1	0	4	0	—		18	0
Famalicão	2022–23	Primeira Liga	5	0	1	0	0	0	—		6	0
Famalicão	Total		18	0	2	0	4	0	—		24	0
Torreense (loan)	2023–24	Liga Portugal 2	5	0	2	0	0	0	—		7	0
Gloria Buzău	2024–25	Liga I	27	1	1	0	—		—		28	1
Career total			97	1	8	0	5	0	1	0	111	1

=== International ===
As of match played 10 September 2024

Appearances and goals by national team and year
National team	Year	Apps	Goals
Cape Verde
Cape Verde	2023	3	0
Cape Verde	2024	2	0
Total		5	0

== Honours ==
Benfica

- UEFA Youth League runner-up: 2016–17
