= Nuno Tavares =

Portuguese footballer (born 2000)

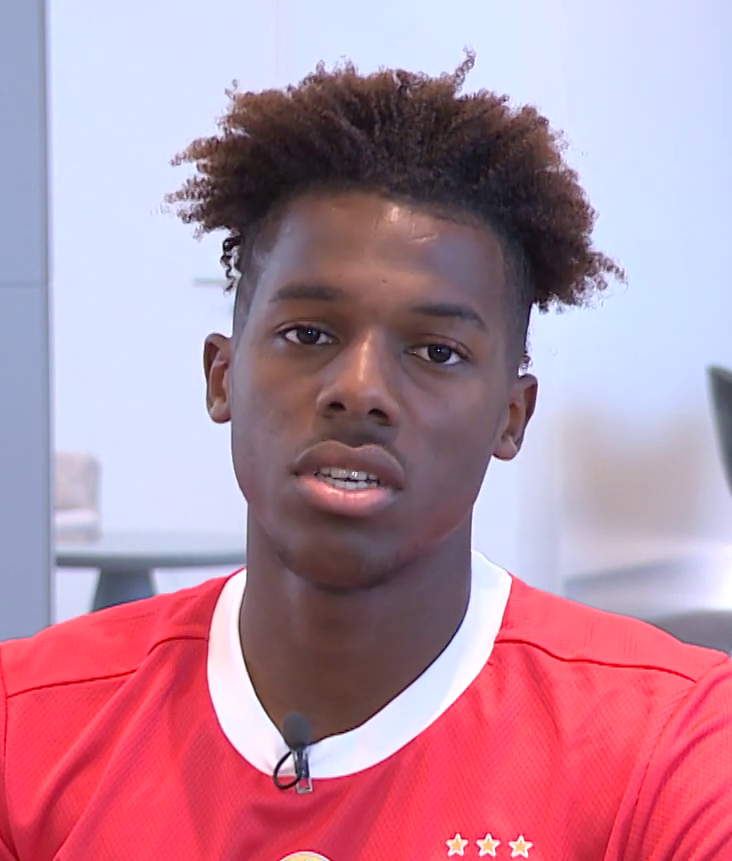
- Tavares with Benfica in 2019

Personal information
- Full name: Nuno Albertino Varela Tavares
- Date of birth: 26 January 2000 (age 26)
- Place of birth: Lisbon, Portugal
- Height: 1.83 m (6 ft 0 in)
- Position: Left-back

Team information
- Current team: Lazio
- Number: 17

Youth career
- 2009–2010: Casa Pia
- 2010–2013: Sporting CP
- 2013–2015: Casa Pia
- 2015–2018: Benfica

Senior career*
| Years | Team | Apps | (Gls) |
| 2018–2019 | Benfica B | 19 | (0) |
| 2019–2021 | Benfica | 25 | (1) |
| 2021–2025 | Arsenal | 22 | (1) |
| 2022–2023 | → Marseille (loan) | 31 | (6) |
| 2023–2024 | → Nottingham Forest (loan) | 8 | (0) |
| 2024–2025 | → Lazio (loan) | 23 | (0) |
| 2025– | Lazio | 34 | (1) |

International career^{‡}
| 2018 | Portugal U18 | 8 | (0) |
| 2018–2019 | Portugal U19 | 14 | (1) |
| 2019–2023 | Portugal U21 | 16 | (1) |
| 2024– | Portugal | 5 | (0) |
- * Club domestic league appearances and goals as of 15:59, 8 November 2026 (UTC) ‡ National team caps and goals as of 22:27, 4 October 2026 (UTC)

Nuno Albertino Varela Tavares (European Portuguese: [ˈnunu taˈvaɾɨʃ]; born 26 January 2000) is a Portuguese professional footballer who plays as a left-back for Serie A club Lazio and the Portugal national team.

== Club career ==
=== Benfica ===
Born in Lisbon of Cape Verdean descent, Tavares finished his development with Benfica after three years at city rivals Sporting CP and two stints with Casa Pia. His manager at Casa Pia, João Silva, drove him home from training every day while also allowing his studies to take priority.

Tavares made his senior debut with Benfica's reserves in the LigaPro, his first match being a 3–2 home win against Covilhã on 27 October 2018. He played his first official game with the first team on 4 August 2019, featuring 90 minutes in the 5–0 victory over Sporting in the Supertaça Cândido de Oliveira at the Estádio Algarve. His Primeira Liga bow took place the following week, opening an eventual 5–0 home defeat of Paços de Ferreira and adding two assists. However, his weaknesses were exposed two weeks later in a 2–0 loss to Porto in O Clássico, which led him to return to the B side and lose his place to Tomás Tavares, being limited to occasional domestic cup matches in place of Alejandro Grimaldo.

Following a difficult season, and a video posted on the Instagram account of a friend of Tavares where Grimaldo was referred to in derogatory terms, Benfica decided to sell the player in spite of his public apologies. During his spell at the club, he made 41 competitive appearances.

=== Arsenal ===
On 10 July 2021, Tavares joined Arsenal on a long-term contract in a deal worth around £8 million. He made his Premier League debut on 13 August, coming on as a late substitute for Calum Chambers in a 2–0 away defeat to Brentford. Following an injury to Kieran Tierney he managed to earn a starting spot, initially achieving good performances and earning praise from coach Mikel Arteta, who especially liked his attacking qualities; however, he also struggled with homesickness, and his defensive frailties, positional mistakes and lapses in concentration led to him being regularly substituted during matches, most notably when he gifted a goal to Diogo Jota in the 4–0 defeat to Liverpool following a misplaced pass.

Tavares scored his first goal on 23 April 2022, through a calm tap-in after David de Gea had saved Bukayo Saka's curl in the third minute of an eventual 3–1 home win against Manchester United.

=== Loans ===
On 30 July 2022, Tavares moved to Ligue 1 club Marseille on a season-long loan; he wanted to have the option to sign permanently at the end of the deal, but Arteta refused to sanction it. He scored on his debut, a 4–1 home victory over Reims. He repeated the feat the following matchday, in the 1–1 draw at Brest.

Tavares improved his form under manager Igor Tudor, with his attacking style being put to good use in the latter's system. On 2 January 2023, however, in the last minutes of a 2–1 away defeat of Montpellier – he had opened the score at the start of the second half – he gave away a penalty after deliberately kicking Arnaud Souquet in the box and was consequently sent off, being handed a three-match ban for his actions two days later.

On 1 September 2023, Tavares joined Nottingham Forest on loan for the season with a £12 million option to buy. Even though he featured more after his compatriot Nuno Espírito Santo replaced Steve Cooper on the bench in December, he totalled only 12 appearances.

Forest did not eventually activate the purchase clause.

=== Lazio ===
On 15 July 2024, Tavares was loaned to Lazio for the 2024–25 campaign with an obligation to buy if certain conditions were met. Early into his spell, he created eight goals from nine league appearances, and he provided five assists in the first five.

Tavares joined the Serie A club on a permanent basis on 5 June 2025.

== International career ==
Tavares won his first cap for Portugal at under-21 level on 10 September 2019, in a 2–0 win in Belarus for the 2021 UEFA European Championship qualifiers. On 7 October 2021, against Liechtenstein in the next edition, he scored the first goal in the 11–0 rout in Vizela.

Tavares was included in a provisional squad for the 2022 FIFA World Cup in Qatar, but did not make the final cut. Courtesy of his Lazio performances, he made his full debut on 15 November 2024, replacing Nuno Mendes late into the 5–1 home victory over Poland in the UEFA Nations League.

== Media ==
Tavares was involved in the Amazon Original sports docuseries All or Nothing: Arsenal, which documented the club by spending time with the coaching staff and players behind the scenes both on and off the field throughout their 2021–22 season.

== Career statistics ==
=== Club ===
As of match played 8 November 2026

Appearances and goals by club, season and competition
| Club | Season | League | | | National cup (Note: Includes Taça de Portugal, FA Cup, Coupe de France, Coppa Italia) | | League cup (Note: Includes Taça da Liga, EFL Cup) | | Europe | | Other | | Total | |
| Club | Season | Division | Apps | Goals | Apps | Goals | Apps | Goals | Apps | Goals | Apps | Goals | Apps | Goals |
|---|---|---|---|---|---|---|---|---|---|---|---|---|---|---|
| Benfica B | 2018–19 | Liga Portugal 2 | 12 | 0 | — | | — | | — | | — | | 12 | 0 |
| Benfica B | 2019–20 | Liga Portugal 2 | 7 | 0 | — | | — | | — | | — | | 7 | 0 |
| Benfica B | Total | | 19 | 0 | — | | — | | — | | — | | 19 | 0 |
| Benfica | 2019–20 | Primeira Liga | 11 | 1 | 1 | 0 | 3 | 0 | 0 | 0 | 1 (Note: Appearance in Supertaça Cândido de Oliveira) | 0 | 16 | 1 |
| Benfica | 2020–21 | Primeira Liga | 14 | 0 | 4 | 0 | 1 | 0 | 5 (Note: Appearances in UEFA Europa League) | 0 | 1 | 0 | 25 | 0 |
| Benfica | Total | | 25 | 1 | 5 | 0 | 4 | 0 | 5 | 0 | 2 | 0 | 41 | 1 |
| Arsenal | 2021–22 | Premier League | 22 | 1 | 1 | 0 | 5 | 0 | — | | — | | 28 | 1 |
| Marseille (loan) | 2022–23 | Ligue 1 | 31 | 6 | 2 | 0 | — | | 6 (Note: Appearances in UEFA Champions League) | 0 | — | | 39 | 6 |
| Nottingham Forest (loan) | 2023–24 | Premier League | 8 | 0 | 4 | 0 | — | | — | | — | | 12 | 0 |
| Lazio (loan) | 2024–25 | Serie A | 23 | 0 | 1 | 0 | — | | 6 | 0 | — | | 30 | 0 |
| Lazio | 2025–26 | Serie A | 23 | 0 | 5 | 0 | — | | — | | — | | 28 | 0 |
| Lazio | 2025–26 | Serie A | 11 | 1 | 0 | 0 | — | | — | | — | | 11 | 1 |
| Lazio | Lazio total | | 57 | 1 | 6 | 0 | — | | 6 | 0 | — | | 69 | 1 |
| Career total | | | 162 | 9 | 18 | 0 | 9 | 0 | 17 | 0 | 2 | 0 | 208 | 9 |

=== International ===
As of match played 4 October 2026

Appearances and goals by national team and year
| National team | Year | Apps | Goals |
|---|---|---|---|
| Portugal | 2024 | 1 | 0 |
| Portugal | 2025 | 2 | 0 |
| Portugal | 2026 | 2 | 0 |
| Total | | 5 | 0 |

== Honours ==
Benfica

- Supertaça Cândido de Oliveira: 2019
