= Raúl de Tomás =

Spanish footballer (born 1994)

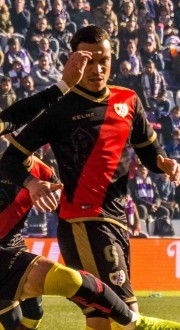
- De Tomás playing for Rayo Vallecano in 2019

Personal information
- Full name: Raúl de Tomás Gómez
- Date of birth: 17 October 1994 (age 32)
- Place of birth: Madrid, Spain
- Height: 1.80 m (5 ft 11 in)
- Position: Striker

Team information
- Current team: Rayo Vallecano

Youth career
- 2001–2004: San Roque
- 2004–2013: Real Madrid

Senior career*
Years	Team	Apps	(Gls)
2012–2013	Real Madrid C	16	(8)
2013–2015	Real Madrid B	62	(14)
2014–2019	Real Madrid	0	(0)
2015–2016	→ Córdoba (loan)	24	(6)
2016–2017	→ Valladolid (loan)	36	(14)
2017–2019	→ Rayo Vallecano (loan)	65	(38)
2019–2020	Benfica	7	(0)
2020–2022	Espanyol	85	(44)
2022–	Rayo Vallecano	46	(5)
2025–2026	→ Al-Wakrah (loan)	11	(1)

International career
2009	Spain U16	4	(0)
2010–2011	Spain U17	6	(2)
2012	Spain U18	2	(2)
2012–2013	Spain U19	4	(2)
2021–2022	Spain	4	(0)
- * Club domestic league appearances and goals as of 04:40, 1 March 2026 (UTC)

Raúl de Tomás Gómez (Spanish pronunciation: [raˈul de toˈmas ˈɣomeθ]; (Note: In isolation, Gómez is pronounced [ˈɡomeθ].) born 17 October 1994) is a Spanish professional footballer who plays as a striker for La Liga club Rayo Vallecano.

He began as a youth team player at Real Madrid, making only one substitute appearance for the first team but playing and scoring regularly on loans to Córdoba, Valladolid and Rayo Vallecano of the Segunda División, winning promotion to La Liga with the last of those teams. In 2019 he joined Portuguese club Benfica for a €20 million fee, returning to Spain's top flight with Espanyol six months later for the same price and signing for Rayo again in 2022.

De Tomás made his full debut for Spain in 2021.

== Club career ==
=== Real Madrid ===
==== Reserve teams ====
Born in Madrid to a Spanish father and a Dominican mother, de Tomás joined Real Madrid's youth academy in 2004 after starting out at CD San Roque EFF. He played his first senior match on 8 April 2012, featuring the last 21 minutes for the C team in a 2–0 home win against CF Pozuelo de Alarcón in the Tercera División.

De Tomás was promoted to the third team in the middle of 2012, with the side now in Segunda División B. On 17 August 2012, he appeared in his first game for the reserves, coming on as a late substitute for Juanfran in a 2–1 away loss to Villarreal CF in the Segunda División.

On 16 December, back with the C side, de Tomás scored a hat-trick in a 5–2 home defeat of CD Marino. He continued to represent both affiliates during the season, and was definitely promoted to Castilla in September 2013.

De Tomás scored his first professional goal on 4 December 2013, netting the first in a 3–2 home victory over Girona FC. He contributed a further six in 27 appearances over the campaign, as the B team suffered relegation.

In July 2014, de Tomás was included in the main squad for its pre-season trip to the United States. He made his competitive debut for them on 29 October of the same year, replacing Karim Benzema in a 4–1 away defeat of UE Cornellà in the round of 32 of the Copa del Rey.

==== Loans ====
On 31 August 2015, de Tomás was loaned to Córdoba CF in a season-long move. A year later, he signed with Real Valladolid also in the second tier and in a temporary deal.

De Tomás was loaned to Rayo Vallecano on 1 September 2017. He was the second-highest scorer of the season with 24 goals, including hat-tricks in victories over Lorca FC, Cultural y Deportiva Leonesa and CF Reus Deportiu, as the club from Vallecas won the league and were promoted back to the top flight; this haul was a season record for any player in its history, and he was also named Segunda División Player of the Month in February and April 2018.

On 17 June 2018, de Tomás signed a new contract with Real Madrid until 2023. Two months later, he was loaned to Rayo Vallecano for another campaign. He scored his first goal in the Spanish top tier on 22 September, but in a 5–1 home defeat against Deportivo Alavés. The following 11 January, also at the Campo de Fútbol de Vallecas, his hat-trick helped the hosts down RC Celta de Vigo 4–2.

=== Benfica ===
On 3 July 2019, de Tomás signed a five-year contract with Portuguese champions S.L. Benfica on a €20 million transfer fee. He debuted for the club as a starter in the 5–0 thrashing of crosstown rivals Sporting CP in the Supertaça Cândido de Oliveira on 4 August. He scored his first competitive goal for the side in a 3–1 loss at FC Zenit Saint Petersburg in the group stage of the UEFA Champions League, as a substitute; UEFA ordered his shirt to say his legal surname for that match, while he habitually wore his initials instead.

During his spell at the Estádio da Luz, de Tomás scored only three goals from 17 appearances.

=== Espanyol ===
On 9 January 2020, de Tomás returned to his country's top flight, signing for RCD Espanyol on a contract lasting until 2026. The transfer fee of €20 million was a new record for the club from Barcelona, nearly doubling the €10.5 million they paid for Matías Vargas; Benfica retained 20% of his future transfer fee. Three days after joining, he made his debut away to UD San Sebastián de los Reyes in the third round of the national cup, coming on in the 61st minute for Jonathan Calleri and wrapping up a 2–0 win. On 19 January, he started in his first league game and scored the decisive goal of a 2–1 victory at Villarreal CF. He scored in each of his first five games, triggering a clause that obliged Espanyol to pay Benfica a further €500,000.

In 2020–21, de Tomás was the league's top scorer with 23 goals as the side won the title and returned to the top division one year after relegation. He was voted Player of the Month for December, scoring four times as his team won their four fixtures.

De Tomás scored in a 2–1 home win over Real Madrid on 3 October 2021 to start a run of goals in five consecutive matches, though he was sent off for an aggression towards Athletic Bilbao's Yeray Álvarez in the fourth of them. Another series of goals over five games included a red card in a 4–1 loss to Real Betis at the RCDE Stadium on 21 January and was concluded with an equaliser in a 2–2 draw in the Derbi barceloní against FC Barcelona on 13 February. With 17 goals in 34 appearances, he was joint-second top scorer in the league season behind Karim Benzema and level with Vinícius Júnior and Iago Aspas; he shared the Zarra Trophy for best domestic scorer with the latter, who had played one game more.

=== Return to Rayo ===
On 13 September 2022, de Tomás returned to Rayo Vallecano on a five-year contract, for a reported initial fee of €8 million with €3 million more dependent on performances; having missed the closing of the transfer window, he only became available for the team's official matches starting January 2023. The transfer went through protracted and heated negotiations, with president Raúl Martín Presa reporting one of the player's agents for an alleged headbutt.

De Tomás did not score for Rayo until 4 May 2023, when he opened a 2–1 home win over former side Valladolid near the anniversary of his last goal. He totalled just four goals in his first 30 games back at the Vallecas Stadium, all coming at the end of the season. In the first half of the following campaign, his only strike was in a 2–0 victory against Segunda Federación's Yeclano Deportivo in the second round of the cup.

De Tomás all but missed 2024–25 due to a virus; it was initially speculated that he had been suspended by the club for causing problems in the dressing room. His only two goals were in the 5–0 rout of amateurs CD Villamuriel in the Spanish cup.

On 20 July 2025, de Tomás was loaned to Al-Wakrah SC of the Qatar Stars League.

== International career ==
In November 2021, due to Ansu Fati's injury, de Tomás was called up for the first time to the senior Spain national team, ahead of 2022 FIFA World Cup qualifiers with Greece and Sweden. He won his first cap against the former, starting in a 1–0 win in Athens.

== Personal life ==
De Tomás' father, also named Raúl (born 1967), was also a footballer and a forward. He spent most of his career in the Spanish third tier. His younger brother, Rubén, came through the youth ranks of Rayo Vallecano.

== Career statistics ==
=== Club ===
As of match played 7 January 2026

Appearances and goals by club, season and competition
Club	Season	League			National cup (Note: Includes Copa del Rey, Taça de Portugal, Amir of Qatar Cup)		League cup (Note: Includes Taça da Liga)		Europe		Other		Total	
Club	Season	Division	Apps	Goals	Apps	Goals	Apps	Goals	Apps	Goals	Apps	Goals	Apps	Goals
Real Madrid C	2011–12	Segunda División B	1	0	—		—		—		—		1	0
Real Madrid C	2012–13	Segunda División B	14	8	—		—		—		—		14	8
Real Madrid C	2013–14	Segunda División B	1	0	—		—		—		—		1	0
Real Madrid C	Total		16	8	—		—		—		—		16	8
Real Madrid B	2012–13	Segunda División	7	0	—		—		—		—		7	0
Real Madrid B	2013–14	Segunda División	27	7	—		—		—		—		27	7
Real Madrid B	2014–15	Segunda División B	28	7	—		—		—		—		28	7
Real Madrid B	Total		62	14	—		—		—		—		62	14
Real Madrid	2014–15	La Liga	0	0	1	0	—		0	0	0	0	1	0
Córdoba (loan)	2015–16	Segunda División	24	6	1	0	—		—		2 (Note: Appearances in La Liga play-offs)	0	27	6
Valladolid (loan)	2016–17	Segunda División	36	14	2	1	—		—		—		38	15
Rayo Vallecano (loan)	2017–18	Segunda División	32	24	0	0	—		—		—		32	24
Rayo Vallecano (loan)	2018–19	La Liga	33	14	1	0	—		—		—		34	14
Rayo Vallecano (loan)	Total		65	38	1	0	—		—		—		66	38
Benfica	2019–20	Primeira Liga	7	0	2	1	3	1	4 (Note: Appearances in UEFA Champions League)	1	1 (Note: Appearance in Supertaça Cândido de Oliveira)	0	17	3
Espanyol	2019–20	La Liga	14	4	1	1	—		0	0	—		15	5
Espanyol	2020–21	Segunda División	37	23	1	0	—		—		—		38	23
Espanyol	2021–22	La Liga	34	17	2	0	—		—		—		36	17
Espanyol	Total		85	44	4	1	—		0	0	—		89	45
Rayo Vallecano	2022–23	La Liga	19	4	0	0	—		—		—		19	4
Rayo Vallecano	2023–24	La Liga	25	1	3	1	—		—		—		28	2
Rayo Vallecano	2024–25	La Liga	2	0	1	2	—		—		—		3	2
Rayo Vallecano	Total		46	5	4	3	—		—		—		50	8
Al-Wakrah (loan)	2025–26	Qatar Stars League	11	1	4	6	—		—		—		15	7
Career total			352	130	19	12	3	1	4	1	3	0	381	144

=== International ===
Appearances and goals by national team and year
National team	Year	Apps	Goals
Spain	2021	2	0
Spain	2022	2	0
Total		4	0

== Honours ==
Rayo Vallecano

- Segunda División: 2017–18

Benfica

- Supertaça Cândido de Oliveira: 2019

Espanyol

- Segunda División: 2020–21

Individual

- Segunda División top scorer: 2020–21
- Segunda División Player of the Month: February 2018, April 2018, December 2020
- Zarra Trophy: 2021–22
- La Liga Team of the Season: 2021–22
