= 2019 Supertaça Cândido de Oliveira =

- Event: Supertaça Cândido de Oliveira (Portuguese Super Cup)
Benfica	Sporting CP
5	0
- Date: 4 August 2019
- Venue: Estádio Algarve
- Man of the Match: Pizzi (Benfica)
- Referee: Nuno Almeida
- Attendance: 28,636

The 2019 Supertaça Cândido de Oliveira was the 41st edition of the Supertaça Cândido de Oliveira. It was played between the champions of the 2018–19 Primeira Liga, Benfica, and the winners of the 2018–19 Taça de Portugal, crosstown rivals Sporting CP, on 4 August 2019. Benfica won the match 5–0 and thus secured their eighth title overall.

== Venue ==
Estádio Algarve was announced as the venue for the 2019 edition of the Supertaça Cândido de Oliveira on 28 May 2019, following the decision of the Portuguese Football Federation Directive Board, four years after hosting the same clubs in a final that ended in a 1–0 win to Sporting CP. After three consecutive years at the Estádio Municipal de Aveiro, the competition returns to the stadium owned by the municipalities of Faro and Loulé.

== Match ==
=== Details ===
4 August 2019
20:45 WEST (UTC+01:00)

Benfica	5–0	Sporting CP
Silva 40'; Pizzi 60', 75'; Grimaldo 64'; Chiquinho 90'	Report

Estádio Algarve, Faro/Loulé
Attendance: 28,636
Referee: Nuno Almeida

Benfica	Sporting CP

GK	99	(Greece) Odysseas Vlachodimos
RB	71	(Portugal) Nuno Tavares
CB	6	(Portugal) Rúben Dias	(yellow card) 45+2'
CB	97	(Portugal) Ferro	(yellow card) 50'
LB	3	(Spain) Álex Grimaldo	(yellow card) 46'
RM	21	(Portugal) Pizzi (c)		(substituted off) 83'
CM	61	(Portugal) Florentino
CM	8	(Brazil) Gabriel		(substituted off) 82'
LM	27	(Portugal) Rafa Silva
CF	9	(Spain) Raúl de Tomás	(yellow card) 72'	(substituted off) 87'
CF	14	(Switzerland) Haris Seferovic	(yellow card) 70'
Substitutes:
GK	72	(Russia) Ivan Zlobin
DF	23	(Nigeria) Tyronne Ebuehi
DF	33	(Brazil) Jardel
MF	14	(Morocco) Adel Taarabt		(substituted on) 83'
MF	19	(Portugal) Chiquinho		(substituted on) 82'
FW	73	(Portugal) Jota		(substituted on) 87'
FW	95	(Brazil) Carlos Vinícius
Manager:
(Portugal) Bruno Lage

GK	1	(Brazil) Renan Ribeiro
RB	50	(Portugal) Thierry Correia
RB	14	(Portugal) Luís Neto
CB	4	(Uruguay) Sebastián Coates	(yellow card) 62'	(substituted off) 66'
LB	22	(France) Jérémy Mathieu
LB	9	(Argentina) Marcos Acuña	(yellow card) 20'	(substituted off) 84'
RM	11	(Brazil) Raphinha	(yellow card) 49'
CM	98	(Ivory Coast) Idrissa Doumbia	(yellow card) 32' (yellow-red card) 89'
CM	37	(Brazil) Wendel
LM	8	(Portugal) Bruno Fernandes (c)	(yellow card) 62'
CF	28	(Netherlands) Bas Dost		(substituted off) 66'
Substitutes:
GK	81	(Portugal) Luís Maximiano
DF	3	(Portugal) Tiago Ilori
DF	26	(Colombia) Cristian Borja		(substituted on) 84'
MF	5	(Brazil) Eduardo Henrique
FW	10	(Argentina) Luciano Vietto
FW	29	(Brazil) Luiz Phellype		(substituted on) 66'
FW	23	(Mali) Abdoulay Diaby		(substituted on) 66'
Manager:
(Netherlands) Marcel Keizer

Man of the Match:
(Portugal) Pizzi (Benfica)

Assistant referees:
André Campos
Bruno Jesus
Fourth official:
André Narciso
Video assistant referee:
Jorge Sousa
Assistant video assistant referees:
Luís Ferreira
Nuno Manso

Match rules

- 90 minutes.
- 30 minutes of extra time if necessary.
- Penalty shoot-out if scores still level.
- Seven named substitutes, of which up to three may be used during regular time.
- Fourth substitution in case of extra time.

== See also ==
- 2019–20 Primeira Liga
- 2019–20 Taça de Portugal
- 2019–20 Taça da Liga
- 2019–20 S.L. Benfica season
- 2019–20 Sporting CP season
