= Florentino Luís =

Portuguese footballer (born 1999)

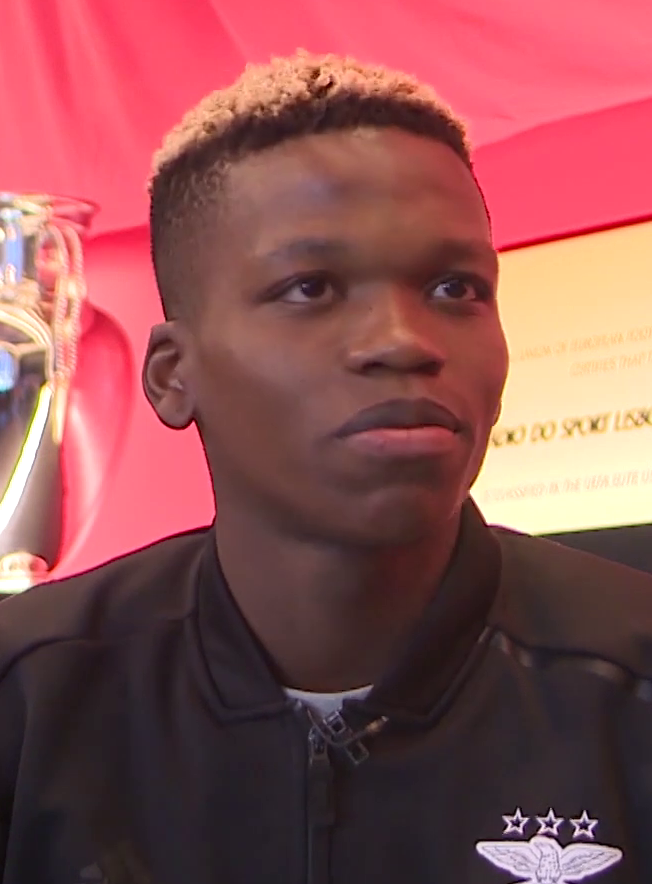
- Florentino with Benfica in 2019

Personal information
- Full name: Florentino Ibrain Morris Luís
- Date of birth: 19 August 1999 (age 27)
- Place of birth: Lobito, Angola
- Height: 1.84 m (6 ft 0 in)
- Position: Defensive midfielder

Team information
- Current team: Ipswich Town
- Number: 12

Youth career
- 2007–2009: Tercena (futsal)
- 2009–2010: Real
- 2010–2018: Benfica

Senior career*
Years	Team	Apps	(Gls)
2016–2019	Benfica B	69	(1)
2019–2026	Benfica	113	(3)
2020–2021	→ Monaco (loan)	9	(0)
2021–2022	→ Getafe (loan)	22	(0)
2025–2026	→ Burnley (loan)	31	(0)
2026	Burnley	0	(0)
2026–	Ipswich Town	6	(1)

International career^{‡}
2014	Portugal U15	2	(0)
2014–2015	Portugal U16	10	(1)
2015–2016	Portugal U17	16	(0)
2016–2018	Portugal U19	26	(0)
2017–2019	Portugal U20	18	(0)
2019–2021	Portugal U21	12	(0)
Medal record
Men's football
Representing Portugal
UEFA European Under-21 Championship
Runner-up	2021 Hungary–Slovenia
UEFA European Under-19 Championship
Winner	2018 Finland
Runner-up	2017 Georgia
UEFA European Under-17 Championship
Winner	2016 Azerbaijan
- * Club domestic league appearances and goals as of 10:31, 31 October 2026 (UTC) ‡ National team caps and goals as of 00:29, 14 June 2022 (UTC)

Florentino Ibrain Morris Luís (born 19 August 1999), known as Florentino (Portuguese pronunciation: [fluɾẽˈtinu]), is a Portuguese professional footballer who plays as a defensive midfielder for Premier League club Ipswich Town. Born in Angola, he has represented Portugal at youth level.

Coming through Benfica's youth system, he began playing for Benfica B in 2017 and was promoted to the first-team a year later, playing a few minutes with the latter. He joined Monaco and Getafe on consecutive loans between 2020 and 2022. He returned to Benfica the following season and established himself as an integral player for the club.

Florentino is a former Portugal youth international, representing his country at various levels, being part of the under-17 team that won the 2016 European Championship, the under-19 team that won the 2018 European Championship and the under-21 team that finished as runners-up at the 2021 European Championship.

== Club career ==
=== Benfica ===
==== 2017–2019: Early years ====
Born in Lobito, Angola, Florentino began playing futsal, at the age of 8 at local club Tercena Futsal, before moving to football, after joining Real Massamá in 2009. The following year, he joined Benfica's youth system. On 11 September 2016, he made his professional debut with the club's reserve team as a substitute in a 2–1 home win over Académico de Viseu in LigaPro. During that season, Florentino played in the 2016–17 UEFA Youth League, in which he was a key part of Benfica reaching the final of the competition, which the club lost to Red Bull Salzburg 2–1 in the final and also won the 2017–18 Campeonato Nacional de Juniores.

Following his promotion to Benfica's first team alongside three other Benfica B players on 1 February 2019, Florentino made his Primeira Liga debut as a 62nd-minute substitute in a 10–0 thrashing of Nacional on 10 February. Four days later, he made his European debut as Benfica beat Galatasaray 2–1 in the first leg of the UEFA Europa League round of 32, their first ever victory in Turkey. Florentino scored his first Primeira Liga goal in a 4–0 away win over Moreirense on 17 March 2019. He helped Benfica win their record 37th league title by making 11 appearances (8 starts), featuring in a 4–1 win over Santa Clara on the final day of the league campaign. Despite being a starter under Bruno Lage, following his sacking, with the appointment of Jorge Jesus, Florentino lost his place in the first team and after failing to impress the new coach in pre-season, he requested his coach to be sent on loan, in order to have more game time.

==== 2020–2022: Loans to Monaco and Getafe ====
On 25 September 2020, he joined Monaco on a season-long loan deal for the 2020–21 season, for a reported fee of €1.5 million, with an option to buy of €30 million. He made his debut on 4 October, replacing Youssouf Fofana in the 45th minute in the 1–0 away lost to Brest in Ligue 1. Despite contracting COVID-19 during the season, Florentino found limited minutes, only making two starts in eleven appearances, which saw Monaco finish third place in the league.

On 31 August 2021, Florentino joined La Liga side Getafe on a season-long loan deal for a €500,000 with the Spanish club having an option to buy for €10 million. He made his debut for the club on 18 September, replacing Juan Iglesias in the 46th minute in the 3–0 lost to Rayo Vallecano. Florentino initially became a starter, being the club's best performing midfielder, but following the appointment of Quique Sánchez Flores, he eventually lost his place in the team, and was linked with a potential return to Benfica in January, before making a total of 24 appearances, including 8 starts, as Getafe nearly avoided relegation.

==== 2022–2023: Return and First-team breakthrough ====
Following his loan spell at Getafe, Florentino returned to Benfica the following season. During the pre-season, he impressed newly arrived coach Roger Schmidt with his "quality and commitment", according to the new coach, leading him to earn a spot in the starting eleven, being entrusted by his new manager in the defensive midfield role, in Benfica's first win of the season on 2 August, starting in a 4–1 home win over Midtjylland in the first leg of the 2022–23 UEFA Champions League third qualifying round. He subsequently formed a successful partnership in midfield, with the club's newest signing Enzo Fernández, and in his next six matches he registered a 93% passing rate, 5 tackles per match and won 90% his duels, topping the Primeira Liga's defensive stats, including an assist for David Neres goal in Benfica's 5–0 home win over Marítimo on 18 September, after winning a duel. On 14 October, he agreed to a contract extension to 2027, increasing his buyout clause to €120 million.

==== 2025: Loan to Burnley ====
On 1 September 2025, Florentino joined Burnley on a season-long loan deal for the 2025–26 season, for a reported fee of €2 million. At the time, it was reported that Burnley would pay an additional €24 million to make the loan permanent at the end of the season. He made his debut on 14 September in the 63rd minute in the 1–0 home loss to Liverpool.

On 12 June 2026, Burnley announced the permanent signing of the player.

=== Ipswich Town ===
Around two months after he signed for Burnley permanently for a reported £20.8 million, on 4 August 2026, Florentino signed for newly promoted Premier League club Ipswich Town for an undisclosed fee.. He scored his first Premier League goal for the club in a 2-2 draw at Hull City on 31 October 2026.

== International career ==
Florentino earned 84 caps and scored 1 goal for Portugal across all youth levels, starting with a 2–1 win for the under-15 team against Switzerland in Campo Maior on 10 June 2014. He went with the under-17 team to the 2016 UEFA European Championship in Azerbaijan, helping his team win over neighbours Spain in the final.

At the 2017 UEFA European Under-19 Championship in Georgia, Florentino was part of the Portugal team that finished runners-up to England. He was also in the squad for the following year's event, beating Italy 4–3 in the final after extra time, being named in the Team of the Tournament.

Florentino was named in the under-21 squad for the 2021 UEFA European Under-21 Championship. He was named for the team of the tournament as Portugal finished as runners-up after losing in the final 1–0 to Germany, on 6 June 2021.

In October 2022, he was named in Portugal's preliminary 55-man squad for the 2022 FIFA World Cup in Qatar.

== Style of play ==
Florentino is known for being a tenacious and hardworking player who usually operates in front of his team's defense, acting as a defensive shield for his more attacking teammates. Known for his aggressive tackling, game-reading ability, and anticipation, he excels at breaking down plays, marking opponents, and timing his challenges effectively. In this role, he serves as a vital link, connecting defense and attack as the ball moves through the team.

His strengths include his positional awareness, tactical discipline, intelligence, energy, and ball-winning skills. Beyond his defensive abilities, Florentino is a calm and precise passer with a keen sense of how to transition between attack and defense. He consistently makes accurate passes, quickly analyzing the positions of his teammates and opponents to choose the best option. Florentino also studies his opponents' movements, body posture, and available passing lanes before challenging for the ball, often intercepting and dispossessing them efficiently. His playing style has drawn comparisons to Claude Makélélé and N'Golo Kanté.

== Personal life ==
Florentino was born in Angola. Father of two girls and a boy. Florentino married Bruna Guerreiro Luís in 2020.

== Career statistics ==
=== Club ===
As of match played 31 October 2026

Appearances and goals by club, season and competition
Club	Season	League			National cup (Note: Includes Taça de Portugal, Coupe de France, Copa del Rey, FA Cup)		League cup (Note: Includes Taça da Liga, EFL Cup)		Europe		Other		Total	
Club	Season	Division	Apps	Goals	Apps	Goals	Apps	Goals	Apps	Goals	Apps	Goals	Apps	Goals
Benfica B	2016–17	Liga Portugal 2	18	0	—		—		—		—		18	0
Benfica B	2017–18	Liga Portugal 2	30	0	—		—		—		—		30	0
Benfica B	2018–19	Liga Portugal 2	21	1	—		—		—		—		21	1
Benfica B	Total		69	1	—		—		—		—		69	1
Benfica	2018–19	Primeira Liga	11	1	0	0	0	0	3 (Note: Appearances in UEFA Europa League)	0	—		14	1
Benfica	2019–20	Primeira Liga	10	0	2	0	2	0	3 (Note: Two appearances in UEFA Champions League, one appearance in UEFA Europa League)	0	1 (Note: Appearance in Supertaça Cândido de Oliveira)	0	18	0
Benfica	2022–23	Primeira Liga	33	0	4	0	3	0	14 (Note: Appearances in UEFA Champions League)	0	—		54	0
Benfica	2023–24	Primeira Liga	30	0	5	0	2	0	7 (Note: Three appearances in UEFA Champions League, four appearances in UEFA Europa League)	0	1	0	45	0
Benfica	2024–25	Primeira Liga	26	2	6	0	2	0	9	0	2 (Note: Appearances in FIFA Club World Cup)	0	45	2
Benfica	2025–26	Primeira Liga	3	0	—		—		3	1	1	0	7	1
Benfica	Total		113	3	17	0	9	0	39	1	5	0	183	4
Monaco (loan)	2020–21	Ligue 1	9	0	2	0	—		—		—		11	0
Getafe (loan)	2021–22	La Liga	22	0	2	0	—		—		—		24	0
Burnley (loan)	2025–26	Premier League	31	0	2	0	0	0	—		—		33	0
Ipswich Town	2026–27	Premier League	6	1	0	0	1	0	—		—		7	1
Career total			250	5	23	0	10	0	39	1	5	0	327	6

== Honours ==
Benfica

- Primeira Liga: 2018–19, 2022–23
- Taça da Liga: 2024–25
- Supertaça Cândido de Oliveira: 2019, 2023, 2025

Benfica Youth

- Campeonato Nacional de Juniores: 2017–18

Portugal U17

- UEFA European Under-17 Championship: 2016

Portugal U19

- UEFA European Under-19 Championship: 2018

Individual

- UEFA European Under-17 Championship Team of the Tournament: 2016
- UEFA European Under-19 Championship Team of the Tournament: 2018
