= Gabriel Pires =

Brazilian footballer (born 1993)

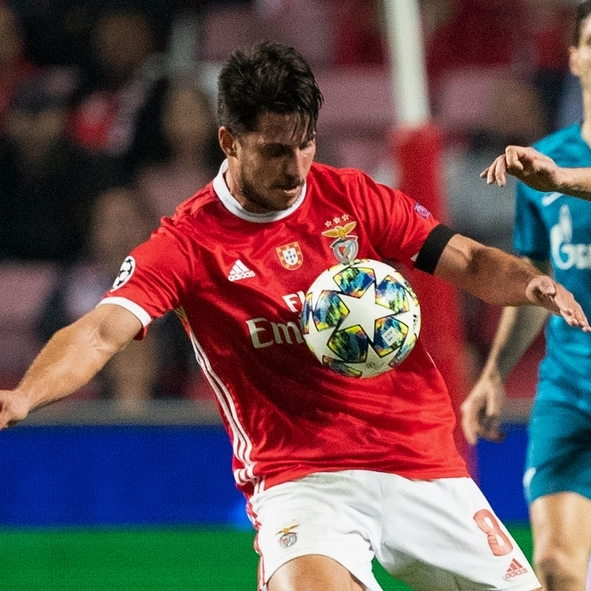
- Gabriel playing for Benfica in 2019

Personal information
- Full name: Gabriel Appelt Pires
- Date of birth: 18 September 1993 (age 33)
- Place of birth: Resende, Brazil
- Height: 1.87 m (6 ft 2 in)
- Position: Midfielder

Team information
- Current team: Juventude
- Number: 29

Youth career
- 2008–2011: Resende
- 2012: Juventus

Senior career*
Years	Team	Apps	(Gls)
2011	Resende	14	(1)
2012–2016	Juventus	0	(0)
2012–2013	→ Pro Vercelli (loan)	25	(1)
2013–2014	→ Spezia (loan)	18	(0)
2014	→ Pescara (loan)	16	(0)
2015	→ Livorno (loan)	17	(1)
2015–2016	→ Leganés (loan)	37	(7)
2016–2018	Leganés	53	(10)
2018–2024	Benfica	59	(3)
2021–2022	→ Al-Gharafa (loan)	18	(5)
2022–2023	→ Botafogo (loan)	28	(3)
2024–2025	Fluminense	8	(0)
2025	Panserraikos	8	(1)
2026	Portuguesa	9	(1)
2026	Mirassol	7	(0)
2026–	Juventude	18	(3)
- * Club domestic league appearances and goals as of 17 November 2026

Gabriel Appelt Pires (born 18 September 1993), sometimes known simply as Gabriel (Brazilian Portuguese: [ɡabɾiˈew]), is a Brazilian professional footballer who plays as a midfielder for Juventude.

== Club career ==
=== Resende ===
Born in Resende, Rio de Janeiro, Gabriel and his older brother Guilherme started each of their careers at Resende; Gabriel signed his first contract on 23 July 2010. He played his first senior season with the club during the 2011 Campeonato Carioca, the regional league in the state of Rio.

=== Juventus and loans ===
In April 2011, Italian newspaper, Tuttosport reported that Juventus signed both Gabriel and Guilherme, however due to bureatic reasons, Gabriel couldn't move to Italy until after his 18th birthday. In January 2012 Gabriel officially signed with the Italian club for a fee of €2 million, though the deal had virtually been complete since 21 April 2011. After joining the Italian side, Gabriel joined the club's youth academy and played the remaining half-season for Juventus' reserve during the 2011–12 season.

On 30 August 2012, Gabriel was sent on a season-long loan deal to Serie B newcomer Pro Vercelli, another Piedmont-based team, along with Juventus teammate, Alberto Masi. He made his Serie B debut on 9 September 2012, as a 61st-minute substitute in a 1–2 home loss against Livorno. He made his first start on 15 September against Sassuolo, and went on to start the next ten league matches prior to suffering a major injury on 10 November 2012, in a home match against Modena. After four months on the sidelines, Gabriel returned to Pro Vercelli's starting lineup on 2 March 2013, in a 1–1 away draw at Juve Stabia. He remained in the club's starting lineup for the remainder of the campaign, making 25 league appearances and scoring one league goal.

Gabriel returned to Juventus on 30 June 2013 and two months later, he was sent out on another season-long loan deal to Serie B side Spezia on 26 August 2013. He made 19 league appearances for the club.

On 23 July 2014, Gabriel signed with Serie B side Pescara on a season-long loan deal along with teammate Vincenzo Fiorillo. He appeared in 17 matches for the club, scoring once.

=== Leganés ===
On 4 August 2015, Gabriel was loaned to Spanish Segunda División side CD Leganés, in a season-long deal. He made his debut for the club on 6 September, coming on as a late substitute for Lluís Sastre in a 1–1 home draw against Real Zaragoza.

Gabriel scored his first goal for Lega on 17 October 2015, netting his team's second in a 2–2 draw against Girona FC. He contributed with 37 appearances and seven goals during the campaign, as his side achieved promotion to La Liga for the first time ever.

On 17 June 2016, Gabriel signed a permanent three-year deal with the Madrid side, who activated his buyout clause for €1 million fee. He made his debut in the main category of Spanish football on 22 August 2016, starting in a 1–0 away win against Celta de Vigo.

Gabriel scored his first goal in the top tier on 17 September 2016, but in a 1–5 home loss against FC Barcelona. The following 8 August, he renewed his contract until 2021.

=== Benfica ===
On 27 August 2018, Gabriel was transferred to Portuguese side S.L. Benfica, signing a five-year contract. He made his debut for the club on 15 September, coming on as a substitute for Pizzi at the 70th minute of a 2–1 home victory over Rio Ave in the Taça da Liga. Four days later, he made his UEFA Champions League debut, replacing Eduardo Salvio on the 62nd minute of a 2–0 defeat to Bayern Munich at the Estádio da Luz. Four days later, Gabriel made his Primeira Liga debut, playing the full 90 minutes in a 2–0 home victory over Desportivo das Aves.

Gabriel scored his first goal for Benfica on 6 February 2019, the opener in a 2–1 home win over rivals Sporting CP in the first hand of the Taça de Portugal semifinal. That season, he scored once in 33 appearances in all competitions for the Eagles, helping the club lift the Primeira Liga trophy.

==== Al-Gharafa (loan) ====
On 28 September 2021, after three years representing Benfica, Gabriel was loaned to Qatari side Al-Gharafa for the 2021–22 season. He made his debut on 2 October, playing the full 90 minutes in a 2–0 home loss to Qatar SC. His first goal for the club came in 26 October, the opener in a 5–0 home win over Al-Khor. On 7 April 2022, Gabriel made his AFC Champions League debut, starting in a 0–0 draw away at Iranian side Foolad. That season, he scored 7 goals in 32 appearances for Al-Gharafa, helping the club reach the Amir Cup final, where they lost 5–1 to Al-Duhail.

==== Botafogo (loan) ====
On 12 August 2022, Benfica sent Gabriel on loan to Brazilian side Botafogo until 30 June 2023, with an option to extend the loan until the end of the year. Nine days later, he made his debut for the club, in the Série A, away at Juventude; 3 minutes after coming on as a substitute for Carlos Eduardo in the second half, Gabriel scored, leading to a 2–2 draw.

In April 2023, Botafogo announced their intention to activate the clause that extended Gabriel's loan until the end of the year. The loan was officially extended the following June. At the end of the 2023 season, Gabriel returned to his parent club Benfica.

=== Fluminense ===
On 18 January 2024, Benfica announced that Gabriel's contract had been terminated by mutual agreement. Two days later, he signed a two-year deal with Série A club Fluminense.

On 25 December 2024, after just eight matches and struggling with injuries, Gabriel rescinded with Flu.

=== Panserraikos ===
Shortly after leaving Fluminense, Gabriel was announced as the new signing of Super League Greece side Panserraikos. On 13 June 2025, he terminated his link with the club, after one goal in 11 matches.

=== Portuguesa ===
On 23 October 2025, Gabriel was announced at Portuguesa for the upcoming season, signing a one-year contract. He was an undisputed starter during the 2026 Campeonato Paulista, before the club turned official his departure on 25 February of that year.

=== Mirassol ===
Shortly after departing Portuguesa, it was announced that Gabriel had agreed to a deal with Mirassol in the top tier.

== Career statistics ==
As of 17 November 2026

Appearances and goals by club, season and competition
Club	Season	League			State League (Note: Includes Campeonato Carioca, Campeonato Paulista)		National Cup (Note: Includes Coppa Italia, Copa del Rey, Taça de Portugal, Emir of Qatar Cup and Copa do Brasil)		League Cup (Note: Includes Taça da Liga and Qatari Stars Cup)		Continental		Other		Total	
Club	Season	Division	Apps	Goals	Apps	Goals	Apps	Goals	Apps	Goals	Apps	Goals	Apps	Goals	Apps	Goals
Resende	2011	Campeonato Carioca	—		14	1	—		—		—		—		14	1
Pro Vercelli	2012–13	Serie B	25	1	—		—		—		—		—		25	1
Spezia	2013–14	Serie B	18	0	—		—		—		—		—		18	0
Pescara	2014–15	Serie B	16	0	—		2	0	—		—		—		18	0
Livorno	2014–15	Serie B	17	1	—		—		—		—		—		17	1
Leganés (loan)	2015–16	Segunda División	37	7	—		3	1	—		—		—		40	8
Leganés	2016–17	La Liga	34	5	—		2	0	—		—		—		36	5
Leganés	2017–18	La Liga	29	5	—		6	1	—		—		—		35	6
Leganés	Total		100	17	—		11	2	—		—		—		111	19
Benfica	2018–19	Primeira Liga	17	0	—		5	1	3	0	8 (Note: Four appearances in UEFA Champions League, four appearances in UEFA Europa League)	0	—		33	1
Benfica	2019–20	Primeira Liga	22	2	—		4	1	1	0	5 (Note: Appearance(s) in UEFA Champions League)	0	1 (Note: Appearance in Supertaça Cândido de Oliveira)	0	33	3
Benfica	2020–21	Primeira Liga	20	1	—		4	0	1	0	7 (Note: Appearance(s) in UEFA Europa League)	0	—		32	1
Benfica	Total		59	3	—		13	2	5	0	20	0	1	0	98	5
Al-Gharafa (loan)	2021–22	Qatar Stars League	18	5	—		4	1	7	1	3 (Note: Appearance(s) in AFC Champions League)	0	—		32	7
Botafogo (loan)	2022	Série A	14	2	—		—		—		—		—		14	2
Botafogo (loan)	2023	Série A	16	0	11	1	4	0	—		3 (Note: Appearance(s) in Copa Sudamericana)	1	—		34	2
Botafogo (loan)	Total		30	2	11	1	4	0	—		3	1	—		48	4
Fluminense	2024	Série A	5	0	2	0	1	0	—		0	0	0	0	8	0
Panserraikos	2024–25	Super League Greece	8	1	—		—		—		—		3 (Note: Appearance(s) in the relegation play-outs)	0	11	1
Portuguesa	2026	Série D	0	0	9	1	0	0	—		—		—		9	1
Mirassol	2026	Série A	7	0	0	0	0	0	—		1 (Note: Appearance(s) in Copa Libertadores)	0	—		7	0
Juventude	2026	Série A	18	3	—		—		—		—		—		18	3
Career Total			321	33	36	3	35	5	12	1	27	1	4	0	434	43

== Honours ==
Benfica

- Primeira Liga: 2018–19
- Supertaça Cândido de Oliveira: 2019

Fluminense

- Recopa Sudamericana: 2024
