= Guilherme Appelt =

Brazilian footballer (born 1992)

Personal information
- Full name: Guilherme Appelt Pires
- Date of birth: 13 February 1992 (age 34)
- Place of birth: Rio de Janeiro, Brazil
- Height: 1.80 m (5 ft 11 in)
- Position: Forward

Team information
- Current team: Solothurn

Youth career
- Resende

Senior career*
Years	Team	Apps	(Gls)
2011	Resende	0	(0)
2011–2012	Juventus	0	(0)
2012	Alessandria	3	(0)
2012–2013	Resende	0	(0)
2013–2014	Sestri Levante		
2014–	Solothurn		
- * Club domestic league appearances and goals

Guilherme Appelt Pires (born 13 February 1992), commonly known as Guilherme, is a Brazilian footballer.

Son of Fernando and Martha Appelt Pires, his parents are co-owners of a huge restaurant in Vargem Grande, RJ.

== Biography ==
In April 2011 he was signed by Italian Serie A club Juventus along with his younger brother Gabriel. Guilherme played for its U20 team in pre-season friendlies. In January 2012 he left for Alessandria. He played 3 games in 2011–12 Lega Pro Seconda Divisione, the bottom level of the professional league of Italy.

He returned to Brazil in mid2012. He played for Resende in the 2012 Copa Rio. and once in the 2013 state league.
