= Jota (footballer, born March 1999) =

Portuguese footballer

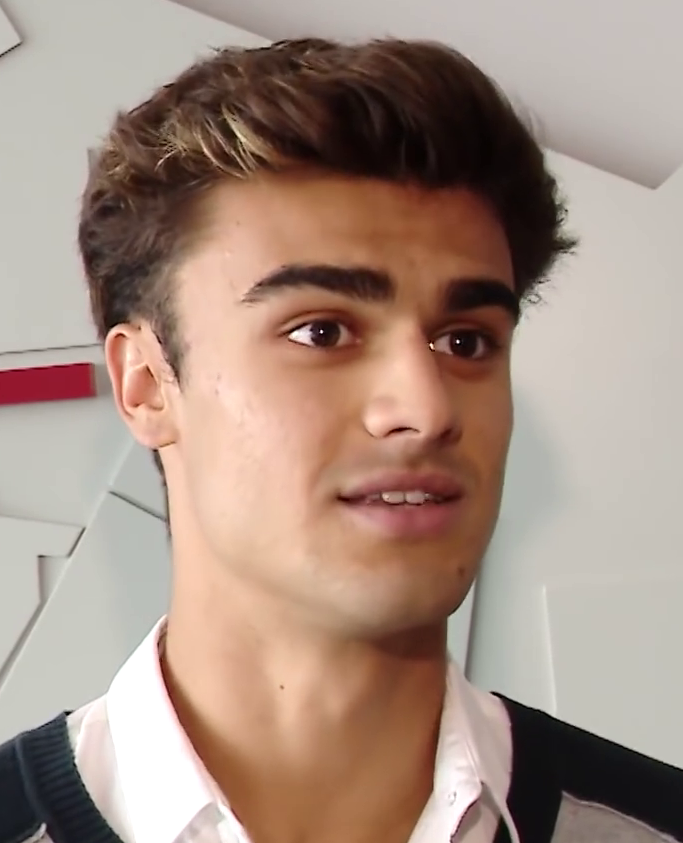
- Jota in 2020

Personal information
- Full name: João Pedro Neves Filipe
- Date of birth: 30 March 1999 (age 27)
- Place of birth: Lisbon, Portugal
- Height: 1.75 m (5 ft 9 in)
- Position: Winger

Team information
- Current team: Celtic
- Number: 7

Youth career
- 2007–2018: Benfica

Senior career*
Years	Team	Apps	(Gls)
2017–2019	Benfica B	46	(9)
2018–2022	Benfica	23	(0)
2020–2021	→ Valladolid (loan)	17	(1)
2021–2022	→ Celtic (loan)	29	(10)
2022–2023	Celtic	33	(11)
2023–2024	Al-Ittihad	17	(4)
2024–2025	Rennes	9	(1)
2025–	Celtic	17	(4)

International career^{‡}
2014	Portugal U15	2	(0)
2014–2015	Portugal U16	9	(2)
2015–2016	Portugal U17	15	(12)
2017–2018	Portugal U19	20	(10)
2017–2019	Portugal U20	8	(0)
2018–2021	Portugal U21	18	(5)
Medal record
Men's football
Representing Portugal
UEFA European Under-21 Championship
Runner-up	2021 Hungary–Slovenia
UEFA European Under-19 Championship
Winner	2018 Finland
Runner-up	2017 Georgia
UEFA European Under-17 Championship
Winner	2016 Azerbaijan
- * Club domestic league appearances and goals as of 13:56, 21 November 2026 ‡ National team caps and goals as of 6 June 2021

João Pedro Neves Filipe (30 March 1999), known as Jota (Portuguese pronunciation: [ʒɔtɐ]), is a Portuguese professional footballer who plays as a winger for Scottish Premiership club Celtic. He is known for his passing and dribbling ability.

Born in Lisbon, Jota came through Benfica's youth academy. He began playing for Benfica B in 2018 and was promoted to the first team a year later, but played only a few minutes. He was loaned to La Liga club Real Valladolid in 2020 and Scottish Premiership club Celtic in 2021, winning the league and Scottish League Cup, before joining the club permanently for £6.5 million in the summer of 2022. In July 2023, Jota joined Saudi Pro League side Al-Ittihad for a reported £25 million. In August 2024, he joined Ligue 1 club Rennes. After just five months at the club, he returned to Celtic in January 2025.

Jota is a former Portugal youth international, representing his country at various levels, including the under-17 team that won the 2016 European Championship, the under-19 team that won the 2018 European Championship and the under-21 team that finished as runners-up at the 2021 European Championship.

== Club career ==
=== Benfica ===
==== 2017–2019: Early years ====
Born in Lisbon, Jota started his career at Ginásio de Corroios, before joining Benfica's youth ranks in 2007. He made his debut for the club's B team on 23 January 2016, replacing Dálcio in the 62nd minute in a 2–1 home loss to Varzim. On 18 October 2018, he made his debut for the first team in a 3–0 away win over Sertanense in the third round of the Taça de Portugal. He won the 2017–18 Campeonato Nacional de Juniores and helped the team reach the final of the 2016–17 UEFA Youth League.

On 1 February 2019, Jota was promoted to Benfica's first team, alongside three other Benfica B players. Following his Primeira Liga debut in a 4–0 home win over Chaves on 24 February, he made his European debut on 14 March, as a first choice, in a 3–0 extra time win over Dinamo Zagreb in the second leg of UEFA Europa League round of 16. After failing to impress manager Bruno Lage, Jota was used sporadically and found limited first-team minutes, scoring only two goals in the 2019–20 Taça da Liga against Sporting da Covilhã on 3 December and Vitória de Setúbal on 21 December.

==== 2019–2020: Loan to Valladolid ====
On 5 October 2020, Jota moved to La Liga side Real Valladolid on loan for the 2020–21 season. On his debut on 22 November he came on as a 77th-minute substitute for Óscar Plano and scored the final goal of a 3–1 win at Granada, but he added no more goals in 17 games for the rest of the season, which saw the team relegated.

=== Celtic ===
==== 2021–22: Breakthrough ====
On 1 September 2021, Jota joined Scottish Premiership club Celtic on loan for the 2021–22 season, with an option to buy for £6.5 million. Ten days later, he made his debut for Celtic in a 3–0 home win over Ross County, playing the entire game. Jota scored his first goal for the club in a victory against Raith Rovers in the quarter final of the Scottish League Cup on 23 September. He scored his first league goal on 3 October, a late winner in a 2–1 away win to Aberdeen. Having scored six goals in 15 appearances, including two in a 4–2 win at Dundee on 7 November and four assists, he was awarded the SPFL's Player of the Month for both October and November, prompting calls for Celtic to activate the option to buy in his loan contract. On 25 November, Jota scored in a 3–2 away defeat at Bayer Leverkusen in the UEFA Europa League.

A hamstring injury in early December forced him out of the club's League Cup victory against Hibernian. He made his return from injury on 17 January 2022, in a 2–0 home win over Hibernian. After several games without a goal or an assist, on 9 April he assisted Celtic's third goal in a 7–0 win over St Johnstone. In the next matches, Jota scored and assisted twice, earning him the SPFL Player of the Month award for April. On 1 May, he scored his first goal in the Old Firm derby, a 1–1 draw against Rangers at Celtic Park. He finished the season with 13 goals and 14 assists, as the club's top assist provider for the season; 10 of those assists were in the league, the second-highest total, helping Celtic win their 10th Scottish Premiership title in 11 years.

==== 2022–23: Domestic treble and departure ====
On 1 July 2022, Celtic triggered Jota's buyout clause of £6.5 million, signing him on a permanent five-year deal, with Benfica also receiving 30% of a future transfer. Jota started the 2022–23 season by closing Celtic's 2–0 home win against Aberdeen. On 6 August, he provided a hat-trick of assists for the first time in his career as Celtic beat Ross County 3–1 away from home. On 3 September, he scored a goal with a chip against arch rivals Rangers in a 4–0 win at Parkhead. On 14 September, Jota was named player of the match in Celtic's 1–1 draw against Shakhtar Donetsk in the 2022–23 UEFA Champions League. He scored his first UEFA Champions League goal on 5 October in a 3–1 group stage loss to RB Leipzig.

=== Al-Ittihad ===
On 3 July 2023, Al-Ittihad confirmed the signing of Jota for £25 million, a club record fee paid for a player. He joined the likes of Karim Benzema and N'Golo Kanté at Al-Ittihad as part of the massive investment into Saudi Pro League football by the PIF. He scored his first goal for the club on 28 August 2023 in a 3–0 win against Al-Wehda after coming on as a substitute for Benzema, but was later left out of the club's domestic squad by manager Nuno Espírito Santo, with only eight foreign players being allowed as per Saudi league rules.

=== Rennes ===
On 30 August 2024, Jota signed for Ligue 1 club Rennes on a three-year contract, with the transfer fee reported as €10 million. He later told French media that his former teammate N'Golo Kanté had recommended the move to Brittany.

After less than five months in France, and being frozen out of the first team, he made a return to Celtic.

=== Return to Celtic ===
Jota's return to Celtic for a £8.4 million fee was announced on 27 January 2025. He took the number 7 shirt—previously worn by club legends Jimmy Johnstone and Henrik Larsson—after Luis Palma went on loan to Olympiacos. He made his official re-debut with Celtic on 2 February 2025, scoring in the 94th minute against Motherwell at Fir Park, in a 3–1 Celtic victory. On 26 April 2025, he suffered a cruciate ligament injury in a 5–0 win away to Dundee United, with the initial injury report being that he would be out of action for a nine-month spell. In January 2026, Celtic manager Martin O'Neill provided an update on Jota's injury, stating that he had suffered a setback in his recovery that would require keyhole surgery, meaning he would miss the entire of the 2025–26 season.

On 3 October 2026, after 18 months out of the game, Jota made his long-awaited return from injury in a closed-doors friendly at Celtic's Lennoxtown training ground. His first competitive appearance since the injury came in a 2–0 win away to Motherwell on 11 October, when he came on as a 74th-minute substitute for Sebastian Tounekti to make his 100th appearance for Celtic in all competitions.

== International career ==
Jota earned 73 caps and scored 26 goals for Portugal across all youth levels, starting with a 2–1 win for the under-15 team against Switzerland in Campo Maior on 10 June 2014. He went with the under-17 team to the 2016 UEFA European Championship in Azerbaijan, scoring in the penalty shootout win over neighbours Spain in the final.

At the 2017 UEFA European Under-19 Championship in Georgia, Jota was part of the Portugal team that finished runners-up to England. In the final group game, he scored a late penalty as they came back to draw 2–2 with Sweden. He was in the squad for the 2018 tournament, beating Italy 4–3 in the final after extra time. He also finished joint top scorer in the tournament with five goals, and was named in the Team of the Tournament.

In March 2021, Jota took part in the 2021 UEFA European Under-21 Championship in Hungary and Slovenia. He scored in extra time as the team beat Italy 5–3 in the quarter-finals at the Stožice Stadium. Portugal finished as runners-up, after losing in the final 1–0 to Germany.

In October 2022, he was included in a provisional squad for the 2022 FIFA World Cup in Qatar, but did not make the final cut.

== Career statistics ==
As of match played 21 November 2026

Appearances and goals by club, season and competition
Club	Season	League			National cup (Note: Includes Taça de Portugal, Copa del Rey, Scottish Cup, King Cup, Coupe de France)		League cup (Note: Includes Taça da Liga, Scottish League Cup)		Continental		Other		Total	
Club	Season	Division	Apps	Goals	Apps	Goals	Apps	Goals	Apps	Goals	Apps	Goals	Apps	Goals
Benfica B	2016–17	Liga Portugal 2	13	1	—		—		—		—		13	1
Benfica B	2017–18	Liga Portugal 2	13	0	—		—		—		—		13	0
Benfica B	2018–19	Liga Portugal 2	20	8	—		—		—		—		20	8
Benfica B	Total		46	9	—		—		—		—		46	9
Benfica	2018–19	Primeira Liga	4	0	0	0	0	0	1 (Note: Appearance in UEFA Europa League)	0	–		5	0
Benfica	2019–20	Primeira Liga	19	0	2	0	3	2	3 (Note: Two appearances in UEFA Champions League, one appearance in UEFA Europa League)	0	1 (Note: Appearance in Supertaça Cândido de Oliveira)	0	28	2
Benfica	Total		23	0	2	0	3	2	4	0	1	0	33	2
Valladolid (loan)	2020–21	La Liga	17	1	1	1	—		—		—		18	2
Celtic (loan)	2021–22	Scottish Premiership	29	10	3	0	2	1	6 (Note: Five appearances and two goals in UEFA Europa League, one appearance in UEFA Europa Conference League)	2	—		40	13
Celtic	2022–23	Scottish Premiership	33	11	4	2	2	0	4 (Note: Appearances in UEFA Champions League)	2	—		43	15
Celtic	Total		62	21	7	2	4	1	10	4	—		83	28
Al-Ittihad	2023–24	Saudi Pro League	16	4	1	0	—		4 (Note: Appearances in AFC Champions League)	1	8 (Note: Four appearances in Arab Club Champions Cup, two appearances in FIFA Club World Cup, two appearances in Saudi Super Cup)	0	29	5
Rennes	2024–25	Ligue 1	9	1	1	0	—		—		—		10	1
Celtic	2024–25	Scottish Premiership	11	4	3	1	—		2	0	—		16	5
Celtic	2025–26	Scottish Premiership	0	0	0	0	0	0	0	0	—		0	0
Celtic	2026–27	Scottish Premiership	6	0	0	0	0	0	0	0	—		6	0
Celtic	Total		17	4	3	1	0	0	2	0	—		22	5
Career total			190	40	15	4	7	3	20	5	9	0	241	52

== Honours ==
Benfica

- Primeira Liga (1): 2018–19
- Supertaça Cândido de Oliveira (1): 2019

Celtic

- Scottish Premiership (3): 2021–22, 2022–23, 2024–25
- Scottish Cup (1): 2022–23
- Scottish League Cup (2): 2021–22, 2022–23

Portugal U17

- UEFA European Under-17 Championship (1): 2016

Individual

- UEFA European Under-17 Championship Team of the Tournament: 2016
- UEFA European Under-19 Football Championship Top goalscorer: 2018 (5 goals)
- UEFA European Under-19 Championship Team of the Tournament: 2018
- LigaPro's Best Young Player of the Month: August 2018
- LigaPro's Best Young Player of the Year: 2018–19
- SPFL Player of the Month: October 2021, November 2021, April 2022
- PFA Scotland Team of the Year (Premiership): 2021–22
