= Nélson Veríssimo =

Portuguese football manager (born 1977)

Personal information
- Full name: Nélson Alexandre da Silva Veríssimo
- Date of birth: 17 April 1977 (age 49)
- Place of birth: Vila Franca de Xira, Portugal
- Height: 1.82 m (6 ft 0 in)
- Position: Centre-back

Team information
- Current team: Benfica B (manager)

Youth career
- 1987–1989: Povoense
- 1989–1995: Benfica

Senior career*
Years	Team	Apps	(Gls)
1995–1996	Benfica	4	(0)
1996–2004	Alverca	184	(3)
1997	→ Académica (loan)	7	(0)
1998–1999	→ Académica (loan)	30	(0)
2004–2007	Vitória Setúbal	64	(0)
2007–2011	Fátima	112	(4)
2011–2012	Mafra	25	(0)
Total		426	(7)

International career
1994	Portugal U17	3	(0)
1994	Portugal U18	2	(0)
1996-1997	Portugal U20	10	(1)
1997–2000	Portugal U21	19	(0)
2000	Portugal B	2	(1)

Managerial career
- 2012–2019: Benfica B (assistant)
- 2019: Benfica B (caretaker)
- 2019–2020: Benfica (assistant)
- 2020: Benfica (caretaker)
- 2020–2021: Benfica B
- 2021–2022: Benfica (caretaker)
- 2022–2023: Estoril
- 2023–: Benfica B
- * Club domestic league appearances and goals

Nélson Alexandre da Silva Veríssimo (born 17 April 1977) is a Portuguese former footballer who played as a centre-back, currently manager of Liga Portugal 2 side Benfica B.

Formed at Benfica, he totalled 221 Primeira Liga games with that team, Académica de Coimbra, Alverca and Vitória de Setúbal (Taça de Portugal winner in 2005), as well as 149 in the second division for Alverca and Fátima. He earned 36 caps for Portugal up to under-21 and B-team level.

As a manager, Veríssimo held several roles at Benfica, including twice being caretaker manager of the first team, and two spells in charge of the reserves. He also led Estoril in the top flight.

== Playing career ==
Veríssimo was born in Vila Franca de Xira, Lisbon District. During his professional career, the youth graduate at S.L. Benfica (having joined the club's youth system at the age of 12, he only appeared in four first-team games during his short spell) represented F.C. Alverca – the first of his spells being while they acted as the former's farm team– Académica de Coimbra, Vitória de Setúbal, C.D. Fátima and C.D. Mafra.

Signed for Fátima by Rui Vitória, Veríssimo's four seasons at the Estádio João Paulo II involved their only three seasons in the Segunda Liga; their only national title, the 2008–09 Segunda Divisão won against Leonardo Jardim's G.D. Chaves; as well as a run to the fourth round of the Taça da Liga in 2007–08 via a penalty shootout win over FC Porto.

== Coaching career ==
Veríssimo rejoined Benfica immediately after retiring, being appointed assistant coach with the reserves in the second division, first under Luís Norton de Matos, then former teammate at the club Hélder Cristóvão. In January 2019, as Bruno Lage was named caretaker manager at the main squad, he assumed the same position in the secondary team; he returned to the latter's technical staff shortly after, now permanently in charge of the main squad.

When Lage resigned in July 2020, after Benfica fell into second place behind FC Porto in the closing stages of the season, Veríssimo took interim charge of the first team; he won 3–1 at home to Boavista F.C. on his debut.

After the appointment of Jorge Jesus as manager of the first team, Veríssimo was named manager of the reserves, replacing Renato Paiva. In December 2021, after Jesus was sacked, he was again named interim of the main squad, leaving Benfica B as leader of the Portuguese second league. He led the team into the Final of the Taça da Liga, losing 2–1 against Sporting CP. Benfica remained trophyless, and Veríssimo guided the club to the Champions League quarter-finals, losing to Liverpool 6–4 on aggregate and a disappointing third place finish, qualifying to the third qualifying round of the UEFA Champions League.

After leaving Benfica at the end of the season, Veríssimo was announced as the new manager of G.D. Estoril Praia on 2 July 2022, replacing Bruno Pinheiro. He was dismissed the following 24 February with the team 15th after 21 games, albeit seven points outside the relegation play-off place.

On 6 July 2023, Benfica announced that Veríssimo would return as head coach of the B team for the 2023–24 season.

== Managerial statistics ==
As of match played 1 November 2023

Managerial record by team and tenure
Team	From	To	Record								Ref
Team	From	To	G	W	D	L	GF	GA	GD	Win %	Ref
Benfica B (caretaker)	3 January 2019	15 January 2019	3	0	1	2	5	7	−2	0.00	
Benfica (caretaker)	30 June 2020	1 August 2020	6	4	1	1	13	5	+8	66.67	
Benfica B	25 December 2020	28 December 2021	36	18	10	8	64	38	+26	50.00	
Benfica (caretaker)	28 December 2021	13 March 2022	25	12	7	6	41	29	+12	48.00	
Estoril	1 July 2022	24 February 2023	29	7	6	16	26	43	−17	24.14	
Benfica B	1 July 2023	28 December 2021	8	2	2	4	12	14	−2	25.00	
Total			106	42	27	37	161	136	+25	39.62	—

== Honours ==
=== Player ===
Vitória Setúbal

- Taça de Portugal: 2004–05

Fátima

- Portuguese Second Division: 2008–09

=== Manager ===
Individual

- Liga Portugal 2 Manager of the Month: January 2024
