= Bruno Lage =

Portuguese football manager

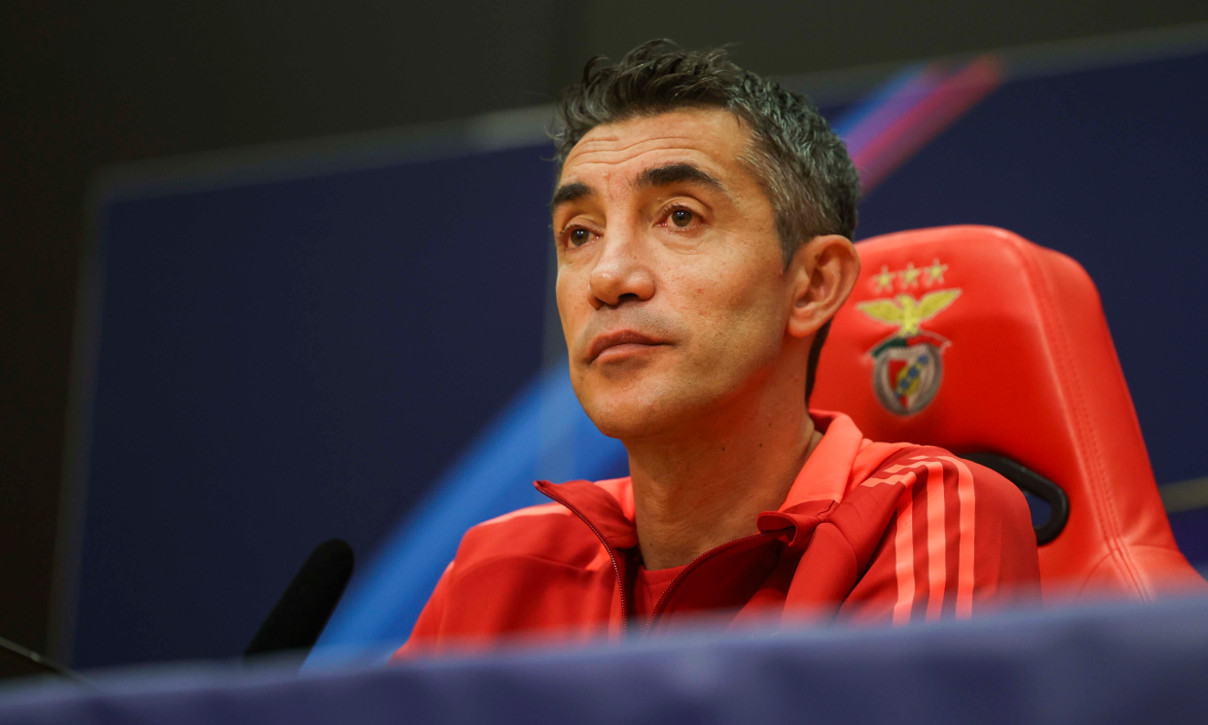
- Lage in 2024

Personal information
- Full name: Bruno Miguel Silva do Nascimento
- Date of birth: 12 May 1976 (age 50)
- Place of birth: Setúbal, Portugal
- Position: Right winger

Team information
- Current team: Diriyah (head coach)

Youth career
- 1990–1991: Independente
- 1993–1995: UCRD Praiense

Senior career*
Years	Team	Apps	(Gls)
1999–2000	UCRD Praiense		
2001–2002	Quintajense		

Managerial career
- 2018–2019: Benfica B
- 2019–2020: Benfica
- 2021–2022: Wolverhampton Wanderers
- 2023: Botafogo
- 2024–2025: Benfica
- 2026–: Diriyah
- * Club domestic league appearances and goals

Bruno Miguel Silva do Nascimento (born 12 May 1976), known as Bruno Lage (Note: "Lage" is a homage to his father, Fernando Lage do Nascimento.) (Portuguese pronunciation: [ˈbɾunu ˈlaʒɨ]), is a Portuguese football manager who is manager of Saudi Pro League club Diriyah.

During his first tenure as coach of Benfica in Portugal, he won the 2018–19 league title and the 2019 Super Cup. He then spent just over a season as manager of Wolverhampton Wanderers in the Premier League, followed by a brief spell at Brazilian club Botafogo before returning to Benfica in 2024.

== Career ==
=== Early career ===
Born in Setúbal, Lage's father, Fernando Lage Nascimento, was formerly a manager in the Portuguese lower leagues. Lage started his coaching career in the youth ranks of hometown club Vitória de Setúbal in 1997. Lage was appointed as a physical/fitness coach by former Vitória and Famalicão manager José Rocha, of whom he was described as a protégé.

In 2004, Lage joined Benfica as a youth coach. Lage coached every youth team from 2004 to 2012. Defender João Cancelo has praised the role of Lage in his development and credited him as a father figure.

Lage later worked as an assistant coach to Carlos Carvalhal at Sheffield Wednesday and Swansea City from 2015 to 2018. Lage co-authored a book on football tactics alongside Carvalhal, Soccer: Developing a Know-How (2014). Lage returned to Benfica as manager of their reserve team in July 2018 to replace Hélder Cristóvão.

=== Benfica ===
==== 2018–19: First season and league title ====
During Benfica's 2018–19 season, Lage took charge of the club's first-team as caretaker manager, replacing Rui Vitória on 3 January 2019. He managed his first Primeira Liga game in a 4–2 home win over Rio Ave on 6 January, and was appointed permanent head coach eight days later. One of Lage's first decisions was to begin regularly starting teenage playmaker João Félix, who had scored twice in the triumph over Rio Ave. Upon being appointed as Benfica coach, Lage had decided to focus on developing youth and adopting an attacking style of play. He deployed a new 4–4–1–1 formation in order to play to the strengths of Felix as a shadow striker behind Haris Seferovic, giving him freedom to roam while encouraging his full-backs to attack and using technically gifted midfielders in order to both defend and create. Lage also promoted younger players to the first team, such as Florentino and Ferro, who would go on to play important roles that season.

Felix started 28 of 29 matches in all competitions under Lage, scoring 17 goals and recording 10 assists. Lage was credited with the emergence of a young player viewed as "the most exciting Portuguese player since Cristiano Ronaldo" and for building the team around Felix. Felix called Lage "the manager who put me where I am today."

On 10 February, after winning two consecutive Lisbon derbys – including a 4–2 away win in the league – Lage led Benfica to the biggest Primeira Liga margin of victory since 1964 and to the league's highest scoring win since 1965, a 10–0 thrashing of Nacional, setting the record for the biggest win at the new Estádio da Luz. On 14 February in his UEFA Europa League debut, Benfica won in Turkey for the first time in their history, beating Galatasaray 2–1 in the first leg of the round of 32. A 0–0 draw at the Estádio da Luz sent Benfica through to the round of sixteen, where they defeated Dinamo Zagreb 3–1 on aggregate after extra-time. Benfica were eliminated from the Europa League at the quarter-finals stage by Eintracht Frankfurt on the away goals rule, having won 4–2 at home before falling to a 2–0 defeat at the Waldstadion on 18 April.

With Benfica's 2–1 away victory in O Clássico on 2 March 2019, Lage won his third of four clashes against rivals Sporting CP and Porto, equaling the same number of wins Rui Vitória achieved in 16 matches. From matchday 16 to 34, Lage won 18 league matches and drew just one to win his first major trophy, Benfica's 37th league title. With a 94% winning percentage, he surpassed Jimmy Hagan's record at Benfica and achieved Primeira Liga's all-time best second round: 49 points from 19 games. In addition, he equalled Sven-Göran Eriksson's 1990–91 feat of beating Porto, Sporting, and Braga away in the same season. Under Lage, Benfica finished the league with 103 goals scored, equaling the club's record of the 1963–64 season.

==== 2019–20: Super Cup title and departure ====
Lage then started a second season at Benfica with a 5–0 win over Sporting CP in the Super Cup.

On 17 September, he made his UEFA Champions League debut in a 2–1 home defeat to German side RB Leipzig, continuing Benfica's record in the competition of having lost 11 times in the last 14 games. A 3–0 victory over Zenit Saint Petersburg in Benfica's final group stage game meant that Benfica finished in 3rd place and progressed to the Europa League, finishing above the Russian team by virtue of a superior head-to-head record. The victory ensured that Benfica "finished the Champions League campaign on a high, but there is a sense that they should have done better."

Following a win at Tondela on 27 October, Lage set the record for the quickest coach to record 25 victories in the Primeira Liga, having won 25 of his first 27 league matches and triumphing in every away game. Lage's Benfica would go on to win every away league game under him in 2019, having scored 42 goals in 15 games. In January 2020, Benfica set a new record for the number of consecutive wins away from home, having achieved victory 17 consecutive times since Lage had been appointed. This record was extended to 18 successive away wins after defeating Paços de Ferreira at Estádio da Mata Real, however, the team's winning run was ended with a 3–2 defeat at Porto.

On 29 June 2020, Lage made his position available after equalising Benfica's worst ever series of results – 2 wins in 13 matches in the 2000–01 season – and establishing a record of 5 consecutive matches without a win at Estádio da Luz, which included defeats to Braga and Santa Clara. Lage's reign at Benfica was summarised as him having a strong record of managing his players and promoting youth; however, players felt disengaged by training, and that Lage and the team had failed to adjust to the loss of João Félix.

He was replaced by his assistant coach Nélson Veríssimo on 30 June, and had his contract terminated on 4 July that year.

=== Wolverhampton Wanderers ===
==== 2021–22: First season and defensive record ====
In June 2021, Lage was lined up to succeed compatriot Nuno Espírito Santo at Premier League club Wolverhampton Wanderers. He required a hearing for a work permit, as he did not qualify automatically to work in Britain post-Brexit. The hearing was successful and, on 9 June, he was confirmed as the club's new head coach for the 2021–22 season. Lage's remit was described as "attacking football, fluid formations and developing youth", in addition to challenging for European football.

Lage's first signing for Wolves was winger Francisco Trincão, who joined the club on a season-long loan from Barcelona. Further additions were made to the first-team in the form of goalkeeper José Sá and the loan signing of Korean forward Hwang Hee-chan. Sá would go on to win Wolves' player of the season award that year after a string of impressive performances, and was credited for his sweeper keeper role, which allowed Lage to adopt a strategy of building attacks from the back of defence.

On 14 August 2021, Wolves lost 1–0 away to Leicester City in Lage's first game. In his first home game at Molineux, Lage lost 1–0 to a Tottenham Hotspur side managed by Nuno Espírito Santo. He achieved his first win ten days later, a 4–0 victory at Nottingham Forest in the second round of the EFL Cup. Despite not winning any of their opening three league fixtures, Lage's side was praised for their attacking playing style, with supporters dubbing it "Bruno-ball". During pre-season, Lage had initially attempted to move Wolves away from the 3–4–3 system favoured by his predecessor, and deployed a 4–4–2 or 4–2–3–1; however, he reverted to the five-man defence once the season started, due to issues with the defence. Relying on the players favoured by Espírito Santo and adopting a similar style of play, Lage's first season was described as "evolution rather than revolution."

Lage got his first league win at the fourth attempt, a 2–0 win against Watford at Vicarage Road on 11 September. It took until Lage's fourth league game at home to record a win, a 2–1 success against Newcastle United on 2 October, with both Wolves strikes coming from Hwang Hee-chan. In the following game, Lage's team recorded their third successive victory by defeating local rivals Aston Villa 3–2 at Villa Park. Wolves had been 2–0 down in the 80th minute and became just the third team in Premier League history to win a match after being two goals behind with ten minutes left of the match. Lage also equalled the club record of leading the side to three successive away victories in the Premier League. Wolves came close to winning four successive top-flight matches for the first time since 1972 in their next game, but conceded an injury-time penalty against Leeds United.

In the January transfer window, Lage made one new signing, bringing in Portuguese winger Chiquinho. The loan transfer of Hwang Hee-chan was also made permanent. Lage won the Premier League Manager of the Month award for January, after winning all three fixtures that month: 1–0 away at Manchester United, 2–1 at Brentford and a 3–1 home win against Southampton. Lage's FA Cup run ended in the fourth round, with Wolves losing 1–0 at home to fellow Premier League side Norwich City, having defeated Sheffield United 3–0 in the third round.

A strong run over the winter months led to praise for what Lage had achieved in his time at Wolves with limited backing in the transfer market, and he was credited with getting an improvement out of younger players such as Rayan Aït-Nouri and Max Kilman. A 2–1 win against Leicester City on 20 February brought Wolves up to seventh place, with Wolves being tipped to battle for a place in European competition for the following season. Wolves were just six points behind fourth place and with two games in hand, leading to suggestions that Lage might lead his team to the Champions League places. From the fourth round of games, Lage's team had taken 40 points from 21 games, the fourth-best total in the league. However, a late defeat away to fellow European challengers Arsenal in the next game caused Wolves to fall behind in the race for continental competition. Wolves had led until the 82nd minute, thanks to a goal from Hwang Hee-chan, but would go on to lose the match in injury time. In a 2–0 home defeat to Crystal Palace, Lage subbed off young defender Ki-Jana Hoever after just twenty-five minutes with a suspected injury, remarking: "I don’t waste time who guys who don’t work hard."

On 18 March 2022, Wolves lost 3–2 at home to Leeds United, despite leading 2–0 at half-time, with Leeds scoring three second-half goals after striker Raúl Jiménez was sent off. This started a run of just five points from the final nine games, with Lage's sole win in this run coming on 2 April against local rivals Aston Villa. Wolves did not win any of their final seven games, ultimately finishing the 2021–22 season in tenth place, despite not having been lower than eighth since December 2021 prior to the final day. Wolves' final fourteen matches included nine defeats and just eleven points won, and although Lage had won away to opponents such as Aston Villa, Manchester United and Tottenham Hotspur, his team had only scored more goals than the three relegated teams.

==== 2022–23: Failed transition and early departure ====
At the end of the previous season, Lage suggested that there would be a "natural transition" of the first team. It was reported that Lage wanted to change the team's style of play, and that he "wants to play a higher line and wants his team to have more of the ball, to be more aggressive, to be quicker at the back, to be more athletic, tactically dynamic (ie, to play two systems, including four at the back) and be much better in duels." Throughout pre-season, Wolves consistently used a four-man defence, playing in a 4–3–3 or 4–2–3–1 formation, as opposed to the five-man defence, which had been used since Nuno Espírito Santo's time at the club, including throughout Lage's first season.

For the 2022–23 season, Lage oversaw a significant overhaul of the Wolves squad. Goalkeeper John Ruddy and defenders Marçal and Romain Saiss were released, with Ki-Jana Hoever and Fábio Silva both sent out on season-long loans. Club captain Conor Coady was also sent out on loan to Everton in order to facilitate Lage's desire to move to a four-man defence, for which he felt Coady was unsuited. Despite starting the club's first two games, midfielder Morgan Gibbs-White was sold to Nottingham Forest, and Willy Boly and Leander Dendoncker both left the club on deadline day. Centre-back Nathan Collins was signed from Burnley, followed by the arrivals of Portuguese duo Gonçalo Guedes and Matheus Nunes, the latter of whom was signed for a club record fee of £38m. Lage had previously coached Guedes as a youth player at the Benfica academy. Towards the end of the month, Austrian striker Saša Kalajdžić also signed for Wolves, and on deadline day Boubacar Traoré joined the club on loan. Midfielder Rúben Neves was also retained, despite speculation that he would be leaving Wolves. The club's transfer window was characterised as Lage reshaping the squad to his own desires; removing players that were perceived as being too used to the system of predecessor Nuno Espírito Santo, and instead bringing in new players which were more suited to the new style of play which he wanted to implement. Lage explained: "I had the feeling... that the circle for some players had finished, that we needed to refresh the team." Wolves spent more than £100m in the summer transfer window, and The Athletic argued that "Lage has been backed... Wolves have transformed their squad completely. Lage called it "the team we were dreaming of" and stated his belief that it was a "new chapter" for his side.

On 6 August, in Wolves' first game of the season, Lage utilised the four-man defence, which the team had been practising in pre-season for the first time, but his team lost 2–1 away to Leeds United, despite initially taking a 1–0 lead. In the club's second game, a point was secured at home to Fulham, after a late penalty save by José Sá. After a loss away to Tottenham Hotspur, an injury-time equaliser for Newcastle United on 28 August denied Wolves their first league win of the season. Lage's team was booed off after a 0–0 draw away to managerless Bournemouth, who had lost their previous game 9–0. The draw meant that Wolves had not won in any of their previous twelve league games. The win arrived in the following match, beating Southampton 1–0 at home on 3 September. The victory against Southampton was marred by an injury to Raúl Jiménez in the warm-up, and new signing Saša Kalajdžić was forced off at half-time with an injury on his debut. With news that Kalajdžić would be out for a significant length of time due to an ACL tear, leaving Wolves without a fit senior striker, Lage signed free agent Diego Costa on 12 September.

Following a 3–0 loss at home to champions Manchester City in the club's next game, it was reported that Lage's job was at risk. On 2 October, after a defeat to West Ham United, Lage and his coaching staff were sacked, with the club 18th in the league. Wolves had scored just three goals, the lowest tally in the league. Tensions in the dressing room were later reported as a reason for Lage's removal, alongside the results. The Athletic said: "Lage fell short in his quest to transform the club’s style of play... There were moments of encouragement and promises of exciting football, but Lage’s reign will go down in Wolves history as a failure." After his dismissal, Lage defended his time at the club on social media, arguing that the team "never lost a match with a striker in the initial line-up, [and] will surely improve as strikers become available."

Lage was initially replaced by under-18s coach Steve Davis on an interim basis, before ultimately being succeeded on a permanent basis by Julen Lopetegui on 14 November.

=== Botafogo ===
On 8 July 2023, after almost a year without coaching, Lage was announced at Campeonato Brasileiro Série A side Botafogo, replacing compatriot Luís Castro. He was sacked on 3 October, after an eight-match winless run, and an eventual elimination from the 2023 Copa Sudamericana.

=== Return to Benfica ===
Lage returned to Benfica on 5 September 2024, being appointed as the club's new head coach, signing a 18-month contract, following the sacking of Roger Schmidt. Lage's first competitive game back in charge of Benfica ended in a 4–1 home victory against Santa Clara on 14 September. He would embark on a seven-match winning streak, including a 4–0 home win against Atlético Madrid on 2 October in the Champions League league phase, which ended on 23 October in a 3–1 home loss to Feyenoord in the Champions League. On 10 November, Benfica recorded their biggest competitive league win against Porto in 60 years with a 4–1 home victory, a result not seen since a 4–0 defeat in the 1964–65 season.

On 11 January 2025, Lage won his first league cup final, as Benfica defeated Sporting CP on penalties. On 17 September, he was sacked, a day after a 3–2 home loss to minnows Qarabağ in their opening 2025–26 Champions League league phase match.

=== Diriyah ===
On 6 July 2026, Lage was appointed as head coach of newly promoted Saudi Pro League club Diriyah.

== Personal life ==
Lage's son, Jaime (born April 2015), is named after Jaime Graça, Lage's biggest influence in football, as a mentor. Lage's younger brother, Luís Nascimento, is also a coach.

== Managerial statistics ==
As of match played 30 October 2026

Managerial record by team and tenure
Team	From	To	Record							
Team	From	To	G	W	D	L	GF	GA	GD	Win %
Benfica B	1 July 2018	3 January 2019 (Note: Statistics do not include two losses by 2–0 in the Premier League International Cup.)	13	8	3	2	15	7	+8	61.54
Benfica	3 January 2019	29 June 2020 (Note: Lage was replaced on 30 June and his contract was terminated on 4 July.)	76	51	12	13	181	76	+105	67.11
Wolverhampton Wanderers	9 June 2021	2 October 2022	51	19	10	22	52	56	−4	37.25
Botafogo	9 July 2023	3 October 2023	15	4	7	4	19	14	+5	26.67
Benfica	5 September 2024	17 September 2025	66	45	10	11	155	60	+95	68.18
Diriyah Club	6 July 2026	present	13	4	3	6	11	17	−6	30.77
Total			234	131	45	58	433	230	+203	55.98

== Honours ==
=== Manager ===
Benfica

- Primeira Liga: 2018–19
- Taça da Liga: 2024–25
- Supertaça Cândido de Oliveira: 2019, 2025

Individual

- Primeira Liga Best Coach: 2018–19
- Portuguese Football Federation Men's Coach of the Year: 2019
- Primeira Liga Manager of the Month: February 2019, March 2019, April 2019, December 2019, January 2020, November 2024, February 2025, March 2025, April 2025,
- Premier League Manager of the Month: January 2022
