= Jean Batista =

Brazilian footballer

Personal information
- Full name: Jean Batista de Andrade Pereira
- Date of birth: 6 March 1992 (age 34)
- Place of birth: Itabuna, Brazil
- Height: 1.81 m (5 ft 11 1/2 in)
- Position: Defender

Team information
- Current team: Covilhã
- Number: 92

Youth career
- –2009: Villemomble Sports

Senior career*
Years	Team	Apps	(Gls)
2009–2011	Fola Esch		
2010–2011	Käerjéng 97		
2011–2013	Inter Bebedouro	0	(0)
2013–2015	Käerjéng 97		
2015	Barretos	0	(0)
2015	Mirassol	0	(0)
2016	Tombense	4	(0)
2017	Iporá	0	(0)
2017	Monte Azul	0	(0)
2017–2018	Rio Preto	0	(0)
2018–	Covilhã	6	(0)
- * Club domestic league appearances and goals as of 18:02, 29 March 2019 (UTC)

Jean Batista de Andrade Pereira (born 6 March 1992), commonly known as Jean Batista, is a Brazilian footballer who currently plays as a defender for Covilhã.

== Career statistics ==
=== Club ===
As of 29 March 2019.

Club	Season	League			Cup		Other		Total	
Club	Season	Division	Apps	Goals	Apps	Goals	Apps	Goals	Apps	Goals
Inter Bebedouro	2012	–			0	0	11 (Note: Appearances in the Campeonato Paulista A3)	0	11	0
Barretos	2015	–			0	0	15	1	15	1
Mirassol	2015	–			12 (Note: Appearances in the Copa Paulista)	0	0	0	12	0
Tombense	2016	Série C	4	0	1 (Note: Appearances in the Copa do Brasil)	0	11 (Note: Appearances in the Campeonato Mineiro)	0	16	0
Iporá	2017	–			0	0	7 (Note: Appearances in the Campeonato Goiano)	0	7	0
Monte Azul	2017	–			0	0	1	0	1	0
Rio Preto	2018	–			0	0	17	1	17	1
Covilhã	2018–19	LigaPro	6	0	1 (Note: Appearances in the Taça da Liga)	0	0	0	7	0
Career total			10	0	14	0	62	2	86	2
