= 2018–19 Sporting CP season =

Sporting CP
2018–19 season
- President: Frederico Varandas
- Manager: Marcel Keizer
- Stadium: Estádio José Alvalade
- Primeira Liga: 3rd
- Taça de Portugal: Winners
- Taça da Liga: Winners
- UEFA Europa League: Round of 32
- Top goalscorer: League: Bruno Fernandes (20); All: Bruno Fernandes (33)
- Biggest win: Belenenses 1–8 Sporting CP (5 May 2019)
- Biggest defeat: Portimonense 4–2 Sporting CP (7 October 2018) Sporting CP 2–4 Benfica (3 February 2019)
| Home colours | Away colours | Stromp colours |

The 2018–19 Sporting CP season was the club's 113th season in existence and 85th consecutive season in the top flight of Portuguese football.

== Overview ==
=== August ===
Sporting CP began the domestic season on 12 August 2018 with a 3–1 away win against Moreirense through two goals from Bas Dost and one from Bruno Fernandes. The first Lisbon derby against Benfica was played on 25 August (matchday 3), where a penalty goal from Nani was not enough for a win as the match finished 1–1 at Estádio da Luz.

== Players ==
| N | Pos. | Nat. | Name | Age | Since | App | Goals | Ends | Transfer fee | Notes |
|---|---|---|---|---|---|---|---|---|---|---|
| 3 | DF | (Portugal) | Tiago Ilori | 25 | 2019 | 3 | | 2023 | Undisclosed | |
| 4 | DF | (Uruguay) | Sebastián Coates (2nd VC) | 27 | 2016 (Winter) | 142 | 10 | 2022 | €5M | |
| 5 | DF | (Brazil) | Jefferson | 30 | 2013 | 122 | 4 | | €0.4M | Loan return from Braga |
| 6 | DF | (Portugal) | André Pinto | 28 | 2017 | 37 | 0 | 2021 | Free | |
| 8 | MF | (Portugal) | Bruno Fernandes (VC) | 23 | 2017 | 89 | 32 | 2023 | €8.5M | |
| 9 | DF | (Argentina) | Marcos Acuña | 26 | 2017 | 81 | 7 | 2021 | €10.5M | |
| 10 | FW | (Colombia) | Fredy Montero | 31 | 2018 | 16 | 4 | 2019 | Free | |
| 13 | DF | (North Macedonia) | Stefan Ristovski | 26 | 2017 | 41 | | | | |
| 16 | MF | (Argentina) | Rodrigo Battaglia | 27 | 2017 | 68 | 3 | | | |
| 17 | FW | (Portugal) | Nani (Captain) | 31 | 2018 | 27 | 9 | | | |
| 19 | GK | (France) | Romain Salin | 34 | 2017 | 18 | | | | |
| 21 | MF | (Brazil) | Raphinha | 21 | 2018 | 19 | 3 | | | |
| 22 | DF | (France) | Jérémy Mathieu | 34 | 2017 | 68 | 5 | | | |
| 23 | FW | (Mali) | Abdoulay Diaby | 27 | 2018 | 26 | 6 | | | |
| 24 | MF | (Portugal) | Francisco Geraldes | 23 | 2017 | 4 | | 2021 | | |
| 25 | MF | (Serbia) | Radosav Petrović | 29 | 2016 | 37 | | | | |
| 26 | DF | (Colombia) | Cristian Borja | 25 | 2019 | 11 | | 2024 | | |
| 28 | FW | (Netherlands) | Bas Dost | 29 | 2016 | 112 | 88 | | | |
| 29 | FW | (Brazil) | Luiz Phellype | 24 | 2019 | 14 | 8 | 2024 | | |
| 30 | FW | (Netherlands) | Luc Castaignos | 25 | 2016 | 17 | | | | |
| 37 | MF | (Brazil) | Wendel | 20 | 2018 | 18 | 2 | | | |
| 40 | GK | (Brazil) | Renan Ribeiro | 28 | 2018 | 21 | | | | On loan from Estoril until 30 June 2019 |
| 76 | DF | (Portugal) | Bruno Gaspar | 25 | 2018 | 22 | 1 | | | |
| 77 | FW | (Cape Verde) | Jovane Cabral | 20 | 2018 | 24 | 4 | | Youth system | |
| 81 | GK | (Portugal) | Luís Maximiano | 19 | 2018 | | | | Youth system | |
| 86 | MF | (Serbia) | Nemanja Gudelj | 26 | 2018 | 27 | 1 | 2019 | | On loan from Guangzhou Evergrande until 30 June 2019 |
| 90 | MF | (Portugal) | Miguel Luís | 19 | 2018 | 10 | 2 | 2019 | Youth system | |
| 98 | MF | (Ivory Coast) | Idrissa Doumbia | 20 | 2019 | 12 | 1 | 2024 | | |
| NA | FW | (Ecuador) | Gonzalo Plata | 17 | 2019 | | | 2024 | | |

- Last updated: 3 February 2019
- Source: Sporting.pt
- Ordered by squad number.

== Transfers ==
=== In ===
| No. | Pos. | Nat. | Name | Age | Moving from | Type | Transfer window | Ends | Transfer fee | Source |
|---|---|---|---|---|---|---|---|---|---|---|
| 2 | DF | (Brazil) | Marcelo | 37 | Rio Ave | Transfer | Summer | 2021 | Free | zerozero.pt |
| 21 | FW | (Brazil) | Raphinha | 29 | Vitória de Guimarães | Transfer | Summer | 2023 | €6.5M | zerozero.pt |
| 1 | GK | (Italy) | Emiliano Viviano | 40 | Sampdoria (Italy) | Transfer | Summer | 2020 | €2M | record.pt |
| 76 | DF | (Portugal) | Bruno Gaspar | 33 | Fiorentina (Italy) | Transfer | Summer | 2023 | €4.5M | zerozero.pt |
| 93 | FW | (Netherlands) | Mees de Wit | 28 | Free agent | Transfer | Summer | 2021 | Free | sporting.pt |
| 17 | FW | (Portugal) | Nani | 39 | Free agent | Transfer | Summer | 2020 | Free | sporting.pt |
| 23 | FW | (Mali) | Abdoulay Diaby | 35 | Club Brugges | Transfer | Summer | 2023 | Free | sporting.pt |
| 14 | MF | (Italy) | Stefano Sturaro | 33 | Juventus (Italy) | Loan | Summer | 2019 | Free | |
| 29 | DF | (Brazil) | Luiz Phellype | 32 | Paços de Ferreira | Transfer | Winter | 2024 | €0.55M | |
| 98 | MF | (Ivory Coast) | Idrissa Doumbia | 28 | Akhmat Grozny (Russia) | Transfer | Winter | 2024 | €4.3M | |
| | DF | (Colombia) | Cristian Borja | 33 | Toluca (Mexico) | Transfer | Winter | 2024 | €3.4M | |
| | FW | (Ecuador) | Gonzalo Plata | 25 | Independiente del Valle (Ecuador) | Transfer | Winter | 2024 | Undisclosed | |
| | MF | (Portugal) | Francisco Geraldes | 31 | Eintracht Frankfurt (Germany) | Loan end | Winter | 2021 | Free | |
| | DF | (Portugal) | Tiago Ilori | 33 | | Transfer | Winter | 2024 | Undisclosed | |

Last updated: 27 July 2018

=== Out ===
| No. | Pos. | Nat. | Name | Age | Moving to | Type | Transfer window | Transfer fee | Source |

== Pre-season and friendlies ==
Win Draw Loss

| 11 July 2018 Friendly | Lancy (Switzerland) | 0–6 | (Portugal) Sporting CP | Geneva, Switzerland |
| 17:00 CEST (UTC+02:00) | | | Piccini; Gauld; Cabral (x2); Montero; Pereira |

| 12 July 2018 Friendly | Neuchâtel Xamax (Switzerland) | 2–1 | (Portugal) Sporting CP | Baulmes, Switzerland |
| 20:00 CEST (UTC+02:00) | Cicek 4'; Santana (yellow card) 20'; Karlen 63' | | Montero 3'; Mišić (yellow card) 50' | Stadium: Stade Sous-Ville |

| 14 July 2018 Friendly | Sporting CP (Portugal) | 1–0 | (France) Nice | Divonne-les-Bains, France |
| 19:00 CEST (UTC+02:00) | Pereira 52' |

| 16 July 2018 Friendly | Sporting CP (Portugal) | 4–1 | (Switzerland) Stade Lausanne | Nyon, Switzerland |
| 20:00 CEST (UTC+02:00) | Castaignos 2'; Geraldes 14'; Mattheus 25'; Cabral 37' | | Matri 45+1' | Stadium: Centre sportif de Colovray Nyon |

| 25 July 2018 Friendly | Sporting CP (Portugal) | 1–2 | (Portugal) Mafra | Alcochete, Portugal |
| 10:30 WEST (UTC+01:00) | Marcelo | | Bruninho; Vinícius Tanque | Stadium: Academia Sporting |

| 28 July 2018 Presentation | Sporting CP (Portugal) | 1–1 | (France) Marseille | Lisbon, Portugal |
| 20:30 WEST (UTC+01:00) | Pinto 61' | | Germain 4' | Stadium: Estádio José Alvalade; Referee: Rui Rodrigues |

| 31 July 2018 Friendly | Sporting CP (Portugal) | 1–0 | (Portugal) Académica | Alcochete, Portugal |
| 17:00 WEST (UTC+01:00) | Dost | | | Stadium: Academia Sporting |

| 2 August 2018 Friendly | Sporting CP (Portugal) | 1–2 | (Portugal) Estoril | Alcochete, Portugal |
| 10:30 WEST (UTC+01:00) | Fernandes | | Roberto (x2) | Stadium: Academia Sporting |

| 5 August 2018 Troféu Cinco Violinos | Sporting CP (Portugal) | 1–1 (4–5 p) | (Italy) Empoli | Lisbon, Portugal |
| 19:00 WEST (UTC+01:00) | Mišić 51' | | La Gumina 69' | Stadium: Estádio José Alvalade |

== Competitions ==
=== Overview ===
| Competition | First match | Last match | Starting round | Final position | Record | | | | | | | |
| Competition | First match | Last match | Starting round | Final position | Pld | W | D | L | GF | GA | GD | Win % |
|---|---|---|---|---|---|---|---|---|---|---|---|---|
| Primeira Liga | 12 August 2018 | 19 May 2019 | Matchday 1 | 3rd | 34 | 23 | 5 | 6 | 72 | 33 | +39 | 67.65 |
| Taça de Portugal | 20 October 2018 | 25 May 2019 | 3rd round | Winners | 7 | 6 | 0 | 1 | 17 | 8 | +9 | 85.71 |
| Taça da Liga | 16 September 2018 | 26 January 2019 | Group stage | Winners | 5 | 4 | 0 | 1 | 10 | 6 | +4 | 80.00 |
| Europa League | 20 September 2018 | 22 February 2019 | Group stage | Round of 32 | 8 | 4 | 2 | 2 | 14 | 5 | +9 | 50.00 |
| Total | | | | | 54 | 37 | 7 | 10 | 113 | 52 | +61 | 68.52 |

Last updated: 25 May 2019
Source: Sporting.pt

=== Primeira Liga ===
==== League table ====
| Pos | Team | Pld | W | D | L | GF | GA | GD | Pts | Qualification or relegation |
|---|---|---|---|---|---|---|---|---|---|---|
| 1 | Benfica (C) | 34 | 28 | 3 | 3 | 103 | 31 | +72 | 87 | Qualification for the Champions League group stage |
| 2 | Porto | 34 | 27 | 4 | 3 | 74 | 20 | +54 | 85 | Qualification for the Champions League third qualifying round |
| 3 | Sporting CP | 34 | 23 | 5 | 6 | 72 | 33 | +39 | 74 | Qualification for the Europa League group stage (Note: Since the winners of the 2018–19 Taça de Portugal, Sporting CP, qualified for European competition based on league position, the spot awarded to the third-placed team (Europa League third qualifying round) was passed to the fourth-placed team, and the spot awarded to the fourth-placed team (Europa League second qualifying round) was passed to the fifth-placed team.) |
| 4 | Braga | 34 | 21 | 4 | 9 | 56 | 37 | +19 | 67 | Qualification for the Europa League third qualifying round |
| 5 | Vitória de Guimarães | 34 | 15 | 7 | 12 | 46 | 34 | +12 | 52 (Note: Vitória de Guimarães finished ahead of Moreirense on head-to-head points: Vitória de Guimarães 1–0 Moreirense, Moreirense 1–3 Vitória de Guimarães.) | Qualification for the Europa League second qualifying round |

Source: Liga Portugal
Rules for classification: 1) Points; 2) Head-to-head points; 3) Head-to-head goal difference; 4) Head-to-head away goals scored; 5) Goal difference; 6) Matches won; 7) Goals scored; 8) Play-off.
(C) Champions

==== Results summary ====
| Overall | | | | | | | | Home | | | | | | Away | | | | | |
| Pld | W | D | L | GF | GA | GD | Pts | W | D | L | GF | GA | GD | W | D | L | GF | GA | GD |
|---|---|---|---|---|---|---|---|---|---|---|---|---|---|---|---|---|---|---|---|
| 34 | 23 | 5 | 6 | 72 | 33 | +39 | 74 | 14 | 2 | 1 | 38 | 13 | +25 | 9 | 3 | 5 | 34 | 20 | +14 |

Last updated: 25 May 2019.
Source: Liga Portugal

==== Result round by round ====
| Round | 1 | 2 | 3 | 4 | 5 | 6 | 7 | 8 | 9 | 10 | 11 | 12 | 13 | 14 | 15 | 16 | 17 | 18 | 19 | 20 | 21 | 22 | 23 | 24 | 25 | 26 | 27 | 28 | 29 | 30 | 31 | 32 | 33 | 34 |
|---|---|---|---|---|---|---|---|---|---|---|---|---|---|---|---|---|---|---|---|---|---|---|---|---|---|---|---|---|---|---|---|---|---|---|
| Ground | A | H | A | H | A | H | A | H | A | H | A | H | H | A | H | A | H | H | A | H | A | H | A | H | A | H | A | H | A | A | H | A | H | A |
| Result | W | W | D | W | L | W | L | W | W | W | W | W | W | L | W | L | D | W | D | L | W | W | D | W | W | W | W | W | W | W | W | W | D | L |
| Position | 3 | 2 | 2 | 3 | 5 | 4 | 5 | 5 | 3 | 2 | 2 | 2 | 2 | 3 | 2 | 4 | 4 | 4 | 4 | 4 | 4 | 4 | 4 | 4 | 4 | 4 | 3 | 3 | 3 | 3 | 3 | 3 | 3 | 3 |

Source: Liga Portugal
A = Away; H = Home; W = Win; D = Draw; L = Loss

==== Matches ====
| 12 August 2018 1 | Moreirense | 1–3 | Sporting CP | Moreira de Cónegos |
| 18:30 WEST (UTC+01:00) | Tavares 6' | | Fernandes 16'; Dost 74' (pen.), 90+2' | Stadium: Parque de Jogos Comendador Joaquim de Almeida Freitas; Attendance: 4,886; Referee: Tiago Martins |

| 18 August 2018 2 | Sporting CP | 2–1 | Vitória de Setúbal | Lisbon |
| 21:00 WEST (UTC+01:00) | Nani 9', 66' | Report | Zequinha 19' | Stadium: Estádio José Alvalade; Attendance: 40,611; Referee: Manuel Oliveira |

| 25 August 2018 3 | Benfica | 1–1 | Sporting CP | Lisbon |
| 19:00 WEST (UTC+01:00) | Félix 86' | Report | Nani 64' (pen.) | Stadium: Estádio da Luz; Attendance: 60,486; Referee: Luís Godinho |

| 1 September 2018 4 | Sporting CP | 1–0 | Feirense | Lisbon |
| 21:00 WEST (UTC+01:00) | Cabral 88' | Report | | Stadium: Estádio José Alvalade; Attendance: 38,688; Referee: Rui Oliveira |

| 24 September 2018 5 | Braga | 1–0 | Sporting CP | Braga |
| 20:15 WEST (UTC+01:00) | Sousa 67' | Report | | Stadium: Estádio Municipal de Braga; Referee: Artur Soares Dias |

| 29 September 2018 6 | Sporting CP | 2–0 | Marítimo | Lisbon |
| 21:00 WEST (UTC+01:00) | Fernandes 12' (pen.); Montero 35' | Report | | Stadium: Estádio José Alvalade; Attendance: 35,238; Referee: Nuno Almeida |

| 7 October 2018 7 | Portimonense | 4–2 | Sporting CP | Portimão |
| 21:00 WEST (UTC+01:00) | Manafa 30'; Nakajima 44', 82'; João Carlos 90+3' | Report | Montero 63'; Coates 88' | Stadium: Estádio Municipal de Portimão; Attendance: 5,685; Referee: Hugo Miguel |

| 28 October 2018 8 | Sporting CP | 3–0 | Boavista | Lisbon |
| 20:20 GMT (UTC+00:00) | Nani 31', 66'; Fernandes 64' | Report | | Stadium: Estádio José Alvalade; Attendance: 27,784; Referee: Carlos Xistra |

| 4 November 2018 9 | Santa Clara | 1–2 | Sporting CP | Ponta Delgada |
| 17:30 GMT (UTC-01:00) | Zé Manuel 32' | Report | Dost 62' (pen.); Acuña 75' | Stadium: Estádio de São Miguel; Referee: Manuel Mota |

| 11 November 2018 10 | Sporting CP | 2–1 | Chaves | Lisbon |
| 20:00 GMT (UTC+00:00) | Dost 23', 86' (pen.) | Report | Niltinho 81' | Stadium: Estádio José Alvalade; Attendance: 20,359; Referee: Tiago Martins |

| 3 December 2018 11 | Rio Ave | 1–3 | Sporting CP | Vila do Conde |
| 20:15 GMT (UTC+00:00) | Schmidt 12' | Report | Fernandes 8'; Dost 22'; Cabral 72' | Stadium: Estádio dos Arcos; Attendance: 5,957; Referee: Carlos Xistra |

| 9 December 2018 12 | Sporting CP | 4–1 | Desportivo das Aves | Lisbon |
| 20:00 GMT (UTC+00:00) | Dost 40' (pen.), 48'; Nani 45+1'; Diaby 59' | Report | Defendi 17' | Stadium: Estádio José Alvalade; Attendance: 35,124; Referee: Vítor Ferreira |

| 16 December 2018 13 | Sporting CP | 5–2 | Nacional | Lisbon |
| 20:00 GMT (UTC+00:00) | Dost 35' (pen.), 87' (pen.); Fernandes 70', 90+1'; Mathieu 75' | Report | Camacho 6'; Paločević 26' | Stadium: Estádio José Alvalade; Attendance: 31,408; Referee: Fábio Veríssimo |

| 23 December 2018 14 | Vitória de Guimarães | 1–0 | Sporting CP | Guimarães |
| 20:00 GMT (UTC+00:00) | Tozé 26' | Report | | Stadium: Estádio D. Afonso Henriques; Attendance: 27,435; Referee: Luis Godinho |

| 3 January 2019 15 | Sporting CP | 2–1 | Belenenses | Lisbon |
| 18:00 GMT (UTC+00:00) | Gaspar 57'; Luís 80' | Report | Fredy 90' | Stadium: Estádio José Alvalade; Attendance: 30,054; Referee: João Capela |

| 7 January 2019 16 | Tondela | 2–1 | Sporting CP | Tondela |
| 19:00 GMT (UTC+00:00) | Delgado 5'; Tomané 74' | Report | Mathieu 76' | Stadium: Estádio João Cardoso; Attendance: 4,772; Referee: Nuno Almeida |

| 12 January 2019 17 | Sporting CP | 0–0 | Porto | Lisbon |
| 15:30 GMT (UTC+00:00) | | Report | | Stadium: Estádio José Alvalade; Attendance: 45,500; Referee: Hugo Miguel |

| 19 January 2019 18 | Sporting CP | 2–1 | Moreirense | Lisbon |
| 18:00 GMT (UTC+00:00) | Nani 3'; Fernandes 26' | Report | Tavares 34' | Stadium: Estádio José Alvalade; Attendance: 30,121; Referee: Rui Costa |

| 30 January 2019 19 | Vitória de Setúbal | 1–1 | Sporting CP | Setúbal |
| 19:00 GMT (UTC+00:00) | Cádiz 23' | Report | Dost 80' | Stadium: Estádio do Bonfim; Attendance: 5,098; Referee: Hélder Malheiro |

| 3 February 2019 20 | Sporting CP | 2–4 | Benfica | Lisbon |
| 17:30 GMT (UTC+00:00) | Fernandes 43'; Dost 89' (pen.) | Report | Seferovic 11'; Félix 36'; Dias 46'; Pizzi 73' (pen.) | Stadium: Estádio José Alvalade; Attendance: 45,503; Referee: Artur Soares Dias (Porto) |

| 10 February 2019 21 | Feirense | 1–3 | Sporting CP | Santa Maria da Feira |
| 20:00 GMT (UTC+00:00) | Petkov 76' | Report | Briseño 44' (o.g.); Fernandes 58', 68' | Stadium: Estádio Marcolino de Castro; Attendance: 4,114; Referee: Manuel Mota |

| 17 February 2019 22 | Sporting CP | 3–0 | Braga | Lisbon |
| 20:00 GMT (UTC+00:00) | Fernandes 33'; Dost 50' (pen.), 68' | Report | | Stadium: Estádio José Alvalade; Attendance: 27,673; Referee: Jorge Sousa |

| 24 February 2019 23 | Marítimo | 0–0 | Sporting CP | Funchal |
| 19:00 GMT (UTC+00:00) | | Report | | Stadium: Estádio do Marítimo; Attendance: 9,174; Referee: Tiago Martins |

| 3 March 2019 24 | Sporting CP | 3–1 | Portimonense | Lisbon |
| 20:00 GMT (UTC+00:00) | Diaby 10'; Raphinha 11'; Fernandes 90' (pen.) | Report | Paulinho 30' | Stadium: Estádio José Alvalade; Attendance: 24,907; Referee: João Capela |

| 9 March 2019 25 | Boavista | 1–2 | Sporting CP | Porto |
| 20:30 GMT (UTC+00:00) | Neris 3' | Report | Machado 17' (o.g.); Fernandes 90+3' (pen.) | Stadium: Estádio do Bessa; Attendance: 7,628; Referee: João Pinheiro |

| 15 March 2019 26 | Sporting CP | 1–0 | Santa Clara | Lisbon |
| 20:30 GMT (UTC+00:00) | Raphinha 59' | Report | | Stadium: Estádio José Alvalade; Attendance: 28,129; Referee: Manuel Oliveira |

| 30 March 2019 27 | Chaves | 1–3 | Sporting CP | Chaves |
| 18:00 GMT (UTC+00:00) | André Luís 60' | Report | Luiz Phellype 23', 90+11'; Fernandes 80' | Stadium: Estádio Municipal Eng. Manuel Branco Teixeira; Attendance: 6,229; Referee: Manuel Mota |

| 7 April 2019 28 | Sporting CP | 3–0 | Rio Ave | Lisbon |
| 20:00 GMT (UTC+00:00) | Luiz Phellype 12'; Fernandes 36' (pen.); Wendel 54' | Report | | Stadium: Estádio José Alvalade; Attendance: 26,198; Referee: Luís Godinho |

| 13 April 2019 29 | Desportivo das Aves | 1–3 | Sporting CP | Aves |
| 20:30 GMT (UTC+00:00) | Falcão 33' (pen.) | Report | Luiz Phellype 24'; Mathieu 44'; Fernandes 84' | Stadium: Estádio do CD Aves; Attendance: 2,895; Referee: Artur Soares Dias |

| 19 April 2019 30 | Nacional | 0–1 | Sporting CP | Funchal |
| 18:00 WEST (UTC+01:00) | | Report | Luiz Phellype 62' | Stadium: Estádio da Madeira; Attendance: 3,804; Referee: Carlos Xistra |

| 27 April 2019 31 | Sporting CP | 2–0 | Vitória de Guimarães | Lisbon |
| 18:00 WEST (UTC+01:00) | Luiz Phellype 40'; Raphinha 52' | Report | | Stadium: Estádio José Alvalade; Attendance: 44,107; Referee: Rui Costa |

| 5 May 2019 32 | Belenenses | 1–8 | Sporting CP | Lisbon |
| 17:30 WEST (UTC+01:00) | Licá 61' | Report | Raphinha 10'; Luiz Phellype 45+1'; Gudelj 65'; Fernandes 70' (pen.), 75', 84'; Dost 77'; Doumbia 90' | Stadium: Estádio Nacional; Attendance: 5,209; Referee: João Capela |

| 11 May 2019 33 | Sporting CP | 1–1 | Tondela | Lisbon |
| 20:30 WEST (UTC+01:00) | Fernandes 6' (pen.) | Report | Tomané 67' | Stadium: Estádio José Alvalade; Attendance: 40,500; Referee: Tiago Martins |

| 19 May 2019 34 | Porto | 2–1 | Sporting CP | Porto |
| 18:30 WEST (UTC+01:00) | Pereira 77'; Herrera 87' | Report | Luiz Phellype 61' | Stadium: Estádio do Dragão; Attendance: 39,808; Referee: Fábio Veríssimo |

=== Taça de Portugal ===
| 20 October 2018 Third round | Loures | 1–2 | Sporting CP | Alverca do Ribatejo |
| 20:45 WEST (UTC+01:00) | Juninho 90+1' | | Fernandes 42'; Nani 56' | Stadium: Complexo Desportivo do F.C. Alverca; Referee: João Malheiro Pinto |

| 24 November 2018 Fourth round | Lusitano Vildemoinhos | 1–4 | Sporting CP | Viseu |
| 15:00 GMT (UTC+00:00) | Braz 44' | | Dost 42', 71'; Fernandes 62'; Diaby 72' | Stadium: Estádio do Fontelo; Referee: António Nobre |

| 19 December 2018 Round of 16 | Sporting CP | 5–2 | Rio Ave | Lisbon |
| 19:30 GMT (UTC+00:00) | Diaby 4', 77'; Dost 32', 61'; Fernandes 42' | | Gaspar 45+1' (o.g.); Carlos Vinícius 83' (pen.) | Stadium: Estádio José Alvalade; Attendance: 12,500; Referee: João Pinheiro |

| 16 January 2019 Quarter-finals | Feirense | 0–2 | Sporting CP | Santa Maria da Feira |
| 20:45 GMT (UTC+00:00) | | | Wendel 64'; Fernandes 66' | Stadium: Estádio Marcolino de Castro; Referee: Fábio Veríssimo |

| 6 February 2019 Semi-finals 1st leg | Benfica | 2–1 | Sporting CP | Lisbon |
| 20:45 GMT (UTC+00:00) | Gabriel 16'; Ilori 64' (o.g.) | Report | Fernandes 82' | Stadium: Estádio da Luz; Attendance: 55,636; Referee: Luís Godinho |

| 3 April 2019 Semi-finals 2nd leg | Sporting CP | 1–0 (2–2 agg.) | Benfica | Lisbon |
| 20:45 GMT (UTC+00:00) | Fernandes 75' | Report | | Stadium: Estádio José Alvalade; Attendance: 34,221; Referee: Hugo Miguel |

==== Final ====
| 25 May 2019 | Sporting CP | 2–2 (a.e.t.) (5–4 p) | Porto | Oeiras |
| 17:15 WEST | Pereira 45' (o.g.); Dost 101' | | Soares 40'; Felipe 120+1' | Stadium: Estádio Nacional; Attendance: 38,000; Referee: Jorge Sousa |
| | Penalties |
| | Dost (penalty missed); Fernandes (penalty scored); Mathieu (penalty scored); Raphinha (penalty scored); Coates (penalty scored); Luiz Phellype (penalty scored) | | (penalty scored) Soares; (penalty scored) Pereira; (penalty missed) Pepe; (penalty scored) Adrián; (penalty scored) Hernâni; (penalty missed) Fernando |

=== Taça da Liga ===
==== Group stage ====
| Pos | Team | Pld | W | D | L | GF | GA | GD | Pts | Qualification | SCP | EST | FEI | MAR |
|---|---|---|---|---|---|---|---|---|---|---|---|---|---|---|
| 1 | Sporting CP | 3 | 2 | 0 | 1 | 8 | 4 | +4 | 6 | Advanced to knockout phase | — | 1–2 | — | 3–1 |
| 2 | Estoril | 3 | 2 | 0 | 1 | 4 | 3 | +1 | 6 | | — | — | 1–2 | 3–2 |
| 3 | Feirense | 3 | 2 | 0 | 1 | 6 | 7 | −1 | 6 | | 1–4 | — | — | — |
| 4 | Marítimo | 3 | 0 | 0 | 3 | 3 | 7 | −4 | 0 | | — | 0–1 | — | — |

Source: Liga Portugal
Rules for classification: Tiebreakers

| 16 September 2018 1 | Sporting CP | 3–1 | Marítimo | Lisbon |
| 20:00 WEST (UTC+01:00) | Raphinha 26'; Fernandes 54', 63' | Report | Correa 61' | Stadium: Estádio José Alvalade; Attendance: 29,500; Referee: Manuel Mota |

| 31 October 2018 2 | Sporting CP | 1–2 | Estoril | Lisbon |
| | Wendel 9' | Report | Lima 71'; Pinto 82' (o.g.) | Stadium: Estádio José Alvalade; Attendance: 10,852; Referee: Hélder Malheiro |

| 29 December 2018 3 | Feirense | 1–4 | Sporting CP | Santa Maria da Feira |
| 19:45 GMT (UTC+00:00) | Silva 24' (pen.) | Report | Raphinha 5'; Fernandes 22'; Dost 60' (pen.); Machado 67' (o.g.) | Stadium: Estádio Marcolino de Castro; Referee: Rui Costa |

==== Knockout phase ====
| 23 January 2019 Semi-finals | Braga | 1–1 (3-4 p) | Sporting CP | Braga |
| 19:45 WET (UTC±00:00) | Sousa 3' | Report | Coates 37' | Stadium: Estádio Municipal de Braga; Attendance: 10,087; Referee: Manuel Oliveira |
| | Penalties |
| | R. Horta (penalty missed); Paulinho (penalty missed); Murilo (penalty missed); Marcelo Goiano (penalty scored); Sousa (penalty scored); Claudemir (penalty scored); Ricardo (penalty missed) | | (penalty missed) Dost; (penalty missed) Coates; (penalty scored) B. Fernandes; (penalty missed) Nani; (penalty scored) Raphinha; (penalty scored) Ristovski; (penalty scored) Jefferson |

| 26 January 2019 Final | Porto | 1–1 (1–3 p) | Sporting CP | Braga |
| 19:45 WEST | Fernando 79' | | Dost 90+2' (pen.) | Stadium: Estádio Municipal de Braga; Attendance: 25,213; Referee: João Pinheiro |
| | Penalties |
| | Telles (penalty scored); Militão (penalty missed); Hernâni (penalty missed); Felipe (penalty missed) | | (penalty scored) Dost; (penalty missed) Coates; (penalty scored) Fernandes; (penalty scored) Nani |

=== UEFA Europa League ===
==== Group stage ====
| Pos | Team | Pld | W | D | L | GF | GA | GD | Pts | Qualification | ARS | SPO | VOR | QRB |
|---|---|---|---|---|---|---|---|---|---|---|---|---|---|---|
| 1 | (England) Arsenal | 6 | 5 | 1 | 0 | 12 | 2 | +10 | 16 | Advance to knockout phase | — | 0–0 | 4–2 | 1–0 |
| 2 | (Portugal) Sporting CP | 6 | 4 | 1 | 1 | 13 | 3 | +10 | 13 | Advance to knockout phase | 0–1 | — | 3–0 | 2–0 |
| 3 | (Ukraine) Vorskla Poltava | 6 | 1 | 0 | 5 | 4 | 13 | −9 | 3 (Note: Goal difference in all group matches: Vorskla Poltava –9, Qarabağ –11.) | | 0–3 | 1–2 | — | 0–1 |
| 4 | (Azerbaijan) Qarabağ | 6 | 1 | 0 | 5 | 2 | 13 | −11 | 3 | | 0–3 | 1–6 | 0–1 | — |

Source: UEFA
Rules for classification: Group stage tiebreakers
Notes:

| 20 September 2018 1 | Sporting CP | 2–0 | Qarabag | Lisbon |
| 20:00 WEST (UTC+01:00) | Raphinha 54'; Cabral 88' | Report | | Stadium: Estádio José Alvalade; Attendance: 30,098; Referee: François Letexier (France) |

| 4 October 2018 2 | Vorskla Poltava | 1–2 | Sporting CP | Poltava |
| 18:55 (19:55 EEST) | Kulach 10' | Report | Montero 90+1'; Cabral 90+3' | Stadium: Oleksiy Butovsky Vorskla Stadium; Attendance: 10,082; Referee: Nikola Dabanović (Montenegro) |

| 25 October 2018 3 | Sporting CP | 0–1 | Arsenal | Lisbon |
| 17:55 WEST (UTC+01:00) | | Report | Welbeck 77' | Stadium: Estádio José Alvalade; Attendance: 40,784; Referee: Damir Skomina (Slovenia) |

| 8 November 2018 4 | Arsenal | 0–0 | Sporting CP | London |
| 20:00 GMT | | Report | | Stadium: Emirates Stadium; Attendance: 59,758; Referee: Gediminas Mažeika (Lithuania) |

| 29 November 2018 5 | Qarabag | 1–6 | Sporting CP | Baku |
| 18:55 (21:55 AZT) | Zoubir 14' | Report | Dost 5' (pen.); Fernandes 20', 75'; Nani 33'; Diaby 65', 82' | Stadium: Tofiq Bahramov Republican Stadium; Attendance: 5,416; Referee: Petr Ardeleanu (Czech Republic) |

| 13 December 2018 6 | Sporting CP | 3–0 | Vorskla Poltava | Lisbon |
| 21:00 (20:00 WET) | Montero 17'; Luís 35'; Dallku 44' (o.g.) | Report | | Stadium: Estádio José Alvalade; Attendance: 25,504; Referee: Manuel Schüttengruber (Austria) |

==== Round of 32 ====
| 14 February 2019 1st leg | Sporting CP | 0–1 | Villarreal | Lisbon |
| 21:00 (20:00 WET) | | Report | Pedraza 3' | Stadium: Estádio José Alvalade; Attendance: 27,134; Referee: Clément Turpin (France) |

| 21 February 2019 2nd leg | Villarreal | 1–1 (2–1 agg.) | Sporting CP | Villarreal |
| 18:55 | Fornals 80' | Report | Fernandes 45+1' | Stadium: Estadio de la Cerámica; Attendance: 14,098; Referee: Pavel Královec (Czech Republic) |

== Statistics ==
=== Appearances and goals ===
Last updated on 18 May 2019

| No. | Pos | Nat | Player | Total | | Primeira Liga | | Taça de Portugal | | Taça da Liga | | UEFA Europa League | |
| No. | Pos | Nat | Player | Apps | Goals | Apps | Goals | Apps | Goals | Apps | Goals | Apps | Goals |
Goalkeepers
| 19 | GK | (France) FRA | Romain Salin | 18 | 0 | 8+1 | 0 | 1 | 0 | 3 | 0 | 5 | 0 |
| 40 | GK | (Brazil) BRA | Renan Ribeiro | 36 | 0 | 26+1 | 0 | 4 | 0 | 2 | 0 | 3 | 0 |
| 81 | GK | (Portugal) POR | Luís Maximiano | 0 | 0 | 0 | 0 | 0 | 0 | 0 | 0 | 0 | 0 |
Defenders
| 3 | DF | (Portugal) POR | Tiago Ilori | 9 | 0 | 4+2 | 0 | 1 | 0 | 1 | 0 | 1 | 0 |
| 4 | DF | (Uruguay) URU | Sebastián Coates | 47 | 2 | 31 | 1 | 4 | 0 | 4 | 1 | 8 | 0 |
| 5 | DF | (Brazil) BRA | Jefferson | 21 | 0 | 8+3 | 0 | 2 | 0 | 2+3 | 0 | 3 | 0 |
| 6 | DF | (Portugal) POR | André Pinto | 24 | 0 | 8+3 | 0 | 1+2 | 0 | 3+1 | 0 | 5+1 | 0 |
| 13 | DF | (North Macedonia) MKD | Stefan Ristovski | 30 | 0 | 22+1 | 0 | 1+1 | 0 | 3 | 0 | 1+1 | 0 |
| 22 | DF | (France) FRA | Jérémy Mathieu | 31 | 3 | 24 | 3 | 3 | 0 | 2 | 0 | 2 | 0 |
| 26 | DF | (Colombia) COL | Cristian Borja | 13 | 0 | 10+1 | 0 | 1 | 0 | 0 | 0 | 1 | 0 |
| 76 | DF | (Portugal) POR | Bruno Gaspar | 28 | 1 | 12+4 | 1 | 4 | 0 | 2+1 | 0 | 4+1 | 0 |
| 80 | DF | (Portugal) POR | Bruno Paz | 1 | 0 | 0 | 0 | 0 | 0 | 0 | 0 | 0+1 | 0 |
| 95 | DF | (Portugal) POR | Thierry Correia | 2 | 0 | 0 | 0 | 0 | 0 | 0 | 0 | 0+2 | 0 |
Midfielders
| 8 | MF | (Portugal) POR | Bruno Fernandes | 51 | 31 | 33 | 20 | 5 | 5 | 4+1 | 3 | 8 | 3 |
| 16 | MF | (Argentina) ARG | Rodrigo Battaglia | 11 | 0 | 8 | 0 | 0 | 0 | 1 | 0 | 2 | 0 |
| 21 | MF | (Brazil) BRA | Raphinha | 34 | 7 | 16+8 | 4 | 1+1 | 0 | 4 | 2 | 2+2 | 1 |
| 24 | MF | (Portugal) POR | Francisco Geraldes | 3 | 0 | 0+3 | 0 | 0 | 0 | 0 | 0 | 0 | 0 |
| 25 | MF | (Serbia) SRB | Radosav Petrović | 23 | 0 | 4+7 | 0 | 0+4 | 0 | 2+1 | 0 | 4+1 | 0 |
| 37 | MF | (Brazil) BRA | Wendel | 31 | 3 | 20+1 | 1 | 3 | 1 | 3+1 | 1 | 2+1 | 0 |
| 86 | MF | (Serbia) SRB | Nemanja Gudelj | 41 | 1 | 26+1 | 1 | 5 | 0 | 3+1 | 0 | 5 | 0 |
| 90 | MF | (Portugal) POR | Miguel Luís | 14 | 2 | 3+5 | 1 | 1+1 | 0 | 1 | 0 | 3 | 1 |
| 98 | MF | (Ivory Coast) CIV | Idrissa Doumbia | 12 | 1 | 4+8 | 1 | 0 | 0 | 0 | 0 | 0 | 0 |
Forwards
| 9 | FW | (Argentina) ARG | Marcos Acuña | 43 | 1 | 30 | 1 | 3 | 0 | 4 | 0 | 6 | 0 |
| 23 | FW | (Mali) MLI | Abdoulay Diaby | 42 | 7 | 19+10 | 2 | 2+1 | 3 | 2+2 | 0 | 4+2 | 2 |
| 28 | FW | (Netherlands) NED | Bas Dost | 34 | 22 | 18+4 | 15 | 3+1 | 4 | 3+1 | 2 | 3+1 | 1 |
| 29 | FW | (Brazil) BRA | Luiz Phellype | 19 | 8 | 9+5 | 8 | 1+1 | 0 | 1 | 0 | 0+2 | 0 |
| 54 | FW | (Portugal) POR | Pedro Marques | 1 | 0 | 0 | 0 | 0 | 0 | 0 | 0 | 0+1 | 0 |
| 77 | FW | (Cape Verde) CPV | Jovane Cabral | 35 | 4 | 15+7 | 2 | 3+1 | 0 | 1+1 | 0 | 2+5 | 2 |
Players who have made an appearance or had a squad number this season but have been loaned out or transferred
| 1 | GK | (Italy) ITA | Emiliano Viviano | 0 | 0 | 0 | 0 | 0 | 0 | 0 | 0 | 0 | 0 |
| 2 | DF | (Brazil) BRA | Marcelo | 1 | 0 | 0 | 0 | 1 | 0 | 0 | 0 | 0 | 0 |
| 20 | DF | (Ghana) GHA | Lumor Agbenyenu | 2 | 0 | 1 | 0 | 0 | 0 | 0+1 | 0 | 0 | 0 |
| 11 | MF | (Brazil) BRA | Bruno César | 5 | 0 | 1+3 | 0 | 0+1 | 0 | 0 | 0 | 0 | 0 |
| 14 | MF | (Italy) ITA | Stefano Sturaro | 0 | 0 | 0 | 0 | 0 | 0 | 0 | 0 | 0 | 0 |
| 27 | MF | (Croatia) CRO | Josip Mišić | 3 | 0 | 1+2 | 0 | 0 | 0 | 0 | 0 | 0 | 0 |
| 7 | FW | (Brazil) BRA | Matheus Pereira | 0 | 0 | 0 | 0 | 0 | 0 | 0 | 0 | 0 | 0 |
| 10 | FW | (Colombia) COL | Fredy Montero | 16 | 4 | 6+3 | 2 | 0 | 0 | 1+1 | 0 | 4+1 | 2 |
| 17 | FW | (Portugal) POR | Nani | 28 | 9 | 16+2 | 7 | 3 | 1 | 2 | 0 | 5 | 1 |
| 18 | FW | (Portugal) POR | Carlos Mané | 7 | 0 | 0+2 | 0 | 1 | 0 | 1 | 0 | 2+1 | 0 |
| 30 | FW | (Netherlands) NED | Luc Castaignos | 4 | 0 | 0+3 | 0 | 1 | 0 | 0 | 0 | 0 | 0 |
