= 2018–19 Taça da Liga =

Allianz Cup

Tournament details
- Country: Portugal
- Dates: 21 July 2018 – 26 January 2019
- Teams: 32

Final positions
- Champions: Sporting CP (2nd title)
- Runners-up: Porto

Tournament statistics
- Matches played: 43
- Goals scored: 122 (2.84 per match)
- Attendance: 283,480 (6,593 per match)
- Top goal scorer(s): Dyego Sousa; Paulinho (4 goals each)

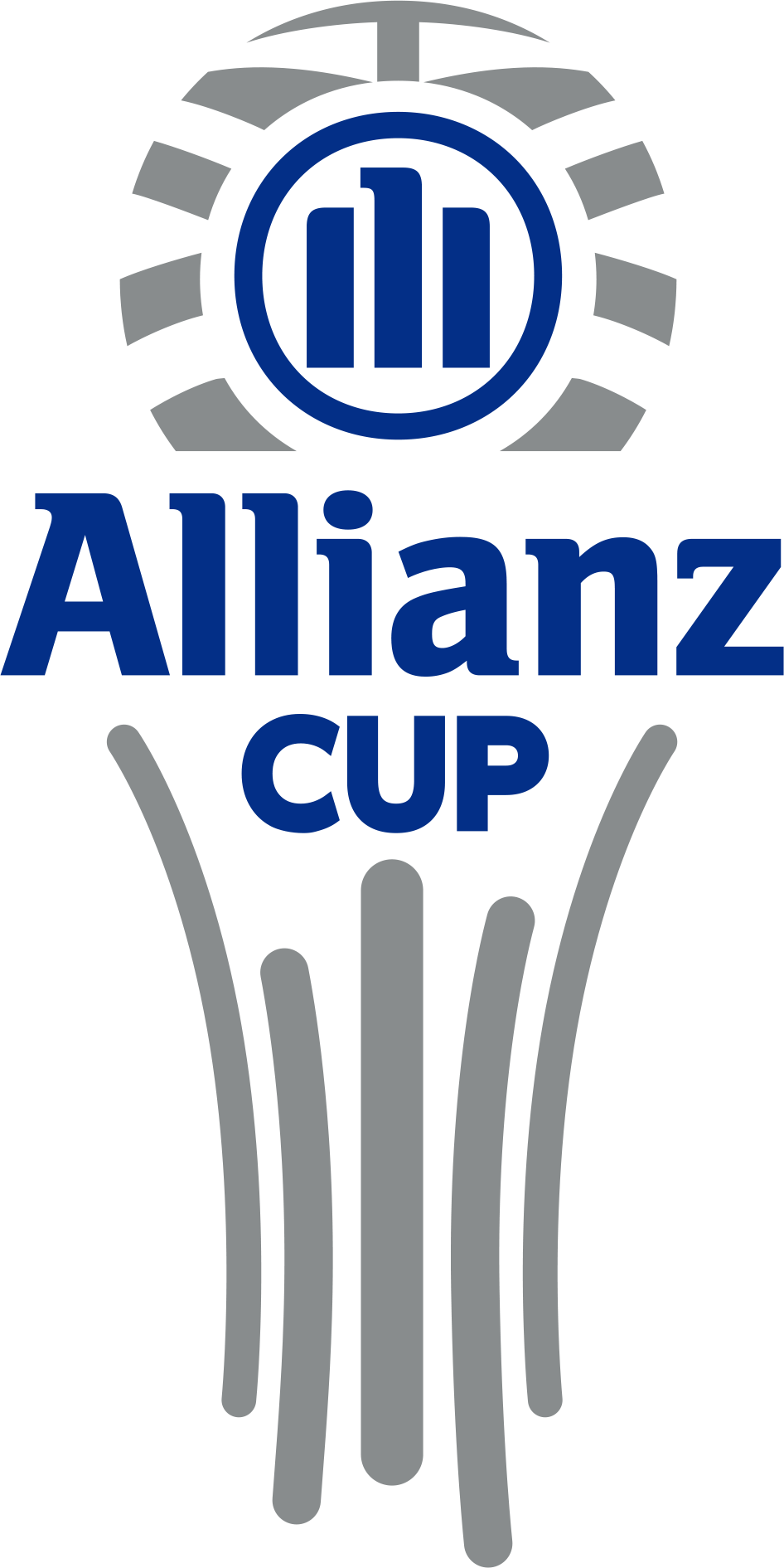
Symbol of the League Cup/Allianz Cup (2018-2022)

The 2018–19 Taça da Liga was the twelfth edition of the Taça da Liga (also known as Allianz Cup for sponsorship reasons), a football cup competition organised by the Liga Portuguesa de Futebol Profissional (LPFP) and contested exclusively by clubs competing in the top two professional tiers of Portuguese football. It began on 21 July 2018 and concluded with the final in Braga on 26 January 2019.

The competition's semi-finals (Benfica v Porto, and Braga v Sporting CP) were marked by controversy involving the video assistant referee (VAR).

In the final, Sporting defeated Porto 3–1 in a penalty shoot-out after a 1–1 draw, becoming the second team (after Benfica) to both defend their title and win the competition multiple times.

== Format ==
The 11 teams placed 4th-16th in the 2017–18 LigaPro (reserve teams from Primeira Liga clubs are excluded) take part in the first round; one-legged ties are played between ten teams, with one team receiving a bye to the next round.

In the second round, the six teams advancing from the previous round (five winners plus the one team with a bye) are joined by the 14 teams placed 5th–18th in the 2017–18 Primeira Liga, by the two teams promoted to 2018–19 Primeira Liga and the team placed third in the 2017–18 LigaPro. Again, one-legged ties were played between 22 teams, with one team receiving a bye to the next round.

The third round features the twelve teams advancing from the previous round (eleven winners plus the one team with a bye) and the four best-placed teams in the 2017–18 Primeira Liga. The 16 teams are drawn into four groups that will be contested in a single round-robin format, with each team playing at least one game at home.

The four group winners qualify for the semi-finals, which are played as single-legged ties. The semi-finals and final are played at a neutral venue, set to be in Braga until 2020.

Round	Teams entering in this round	Teams advancing from previous round
First round (11 teams)	11 teams competing in the 2018–19 LigaPro	
Second round (23 teams)	14 teams ranked 5th–18th in the 2017–18 Primeira Liga; 1 team ranked 3rd in the 2017–18 LigaPro; 2 teams promoted to the 2018–19 Primeira Liga	5 winners from the first round; 1 team that received a bye
Third round (16 teams)	4 teams ranked 1st–4th in the 2017–18 Primeira Liga	11 winners from the second round; 1 team that received a bye
Semi-finals (4 teams)		4 group winners from the third round
Final (2 teams)		2 winners from the semi-finals

=== Tiebreakers ===
In the third round, teams are ranked according to points (3 points for a win, 1 point for a draw, 0 points for a loss). If two or more teams are tied on points on completion of the group matches, the following criteria are applied to determine the rankings:

1. highest goal difference in all group matches;
2. highest number of scored goals in all group matches;
3. lowest average age of all players fielded in all group matches (sum of the ages of all fielded players divided by the number of fielded players).

In all other rounds, teams tied at the end of regular time contest a penalty shootout to determine the winner. No extra-time is played.

== Teams ==
Thirty-two teams competing in the two professional tiers of Portuguese football for the 2018–19 season are eligible to participate in this competition. For teams in both leagues, the final position in the previous league season determined in which round they enter the competition.

Third round (Primeira Liga)
Porto (1st)	Benfica (2nd)	Sporting CP (3rd)	Braga (4th)
Second round (Primeira Liga and LigaPro)
Rio Ave (5th)	Chaves (6th)	Marítimo (7th)	Boavista (8th)
Vitória de Guimarães (9th)	Portimonense (10th)	Tondela (11th)	Belenenses SAD (12th)
Desportivo das Aves (13th)	Vitória de Setúbal (14th)	Moreirense (15th)	Feirense (16th)
Nacional (P1)	Santa Clara (P1)	Paços de Ferreira (R1)	Estoril (R1)
Académico de Viseu (3rd)			
First round (LigaPro)
Académica (4th)	Penafiel (5th)	Arouca (6th)	Leixões (8th)
Cova da Piedade (9th)	Varzim (10th)	Oliveirense (12th)	Famalicão (14th)
Sporting da Covilhã (15th)	Mafra (P2)	Farense (P2)	

Key

- Nth: League position in the 2017–18 season
- P1: Promoted to the Primeira Liga
- P2: Promoted to the LigaPro
- R1: Relegated to the LigaPro

== Schedule ==
Round		Draw date	Match date(s)	Teams	Fixtures
First round		11 July 2018	21–22 July 2018	32 → 27	5
Second round		11 July 2018	28–29 July, 5–6 August 2018	27 → 16	11
Third round	Matchday 1	17 August 2018	14–17 September 2018	16 → 4	24
Third round	Matchday 2	17 August 2018	13 October, 30–31 October, 18 November, 5 December 2018	16 → 4	24
Third round	Matchday 3	17 August 2018	28–30 December 2018	16 → 4	24
Final four	Semi-finals	17 August 2018	22–23 January 2019	4 → 2	2
Final four	Final	17 August 2018	26 January 2019	2 → 1	1

== First round ==
The 11 non-reserve teams competing in the 2018–19 LigaPro entered the competition in this round. Ten teams were paired against each other for five single-legged ties, while the eleventh team (Oliveirense) was given a bye to the next round. The draw took place on 11 July 2018, and matches were played on 21 and 22 July 2018. Games tied at the end of regular time were decided by a penalty shootout with no extra-time being played. The first team drawn in each fixture played at home.

21 July 2018	Mafra	2–0	Sporting da Covilhã	Mafra
16:00 WEST (UTC+01:00)	Jaime 68' (o.g.); Silva 83'	Report		Stadium: Estádio Municipal de Mafra; Attendance: 420; Referee: António Nobre

21 July 2018	Varzim	2–0	Cova da Piedade	Póvoa de Varzim
16:00 WEST (UTC+01:00)	Teles 5'; Awurum 14'	Report		Stadium: Estádio do Varzim SC; Attendance: 853; Referee: Claúdio Pereira

21 July 2018	Farense	0–0 (5–4 p)	Penafiel	Faro
19:45 WEST (UTC+01:00)		Report		Stadium: Estádio de São Luís; Attendance: 851; Referee: André Narciso
	Penalties
	Pedro Kadri (penalty scored); Gomes (penalty scored); Alvarinho (penalty scored); Godinho (penalty scored); Ribeiro (penalty scored)		(penalty scored) Cruz; (penalty scored) Braga; (penalty missed) Abreu; (penalty scored) Araújo; (penalty scored) Ludovic

22 July 2018	Famalicão	1–1 (4–5 p)	Arouca	Vila Nova de Famalicão
16:00 WEST (UTC+01:00)	Monteiro 36'	Report	82' Malele	Stadium: Estádio Municipal 22 de Junho; Attendance: 1,413; Referee: João Malheiro Pinto
	Penalties
	Dias (penalty scored); Hočko (penalty scored); Fabinho (penalty scored); Monteiro (penalty missed); Fabrício (penalty scored)		(penalty scored) Massaia; (penalty scored) Costa; (penalty scored) Malele; (penalty scored) Gomes; (penalty scored) Fortes

22 July 2018	Académica	0–0 (3–4 p)	Leixões	Coimbra
19:45 WEST (UTC+01:00)		Report		Stadium: Estádio Cidade de Coimbra; Attendance: 1,812; Referee: Vítor Ferreira
	Penalties
	Djoussé (penalty missed); Pedroso (penalty missed); Zé Paulo (penalty scored); Ribeiro (penalty scored); Guima (penalty scored); Dias (penalty missed)		(penalty missed) Bura; (penalty missed) L. Silva; (penalty scored) Alves; (penalty scored) Brandão; (penalty scored) Derick Poloni; (penalty scored) Martins

== Second round ==
In the second round, the five first-round winners and Oliveirense, who was given a bye to this round, joined the 14 teams ranked 5th–18th in the 2017–18 Primeira Liga, the team ranked 3rd and the two teams promoted from the 2017–18 LigaPro. Twenty two teams were paired against each other for eleven single-legged ties, while Vitória de Setúbal was given a bye to the next round. The draw took place on 11 July 2018, and matches were played between 28 July 2018 and 6 August 2018. Games tied at the end of regular time were decided by a penalty shootout with no extra-time being played. The first team drawn in each fixture played at home.

28 July 2018	Desportivo das Aves	2–2 (8–7 p)	Santa Clara	Vila das Aves
15:00 WEST (UTC+01:00)	Petrolina 64'; Braga 84'	Report	Monteiro 10' (o.g.); Santana 27'	Stadium: Estádio do CD Aves; Attendance: 1,337; Referee: Iancu Vasilica
	Penalties
	Petrolina (penalty scored); Derley (penalty missed); Soares (penalty scored); Fariña (penalty scored); Gomes (penalty scored); Braga (penalty scored); Defendi (penalty missed); Jorge Fellipe (penalty scored); Amilton (penalty scored); Elhouni (penalty scored)		(penalty scored) Santana; (penalty missed) Pineda; (penalty scored) Lamas; (penalty scored) Stephens; (penalty scored) Rashid; (penalty scored) Santos; (penalty missed) Kaio; (penalty scored) Silva; (penalty scored) Accioly; (penalty missed) Lucas

28 July 2018	Marítimo	3–0	Mafra	Funchal
16:00 WEST (UTC+01:00)	Joel 43', 82'; Correa 50'	Report		Stadium: Estádio do Marítimo; Attendance: 2,855; Referee: João Pinho

28 July 2018	Belenenses SAD	3–1	Oliveirense	Oeiras
18:00 WEST (UTC+01:00)	Fredy 52', 90+4'; Keita 71'	Report	57' Agdon	Stadium: Estádio Nacional; Attendance: 1,214; Referee: José Carlos Rodrigues

28 July 2018	Paços de Ferreira	3–2	Académico de Viseu	Paços de Ferreira
18:00 WEST (UTC+01:00)	Christian 32'; Zé Uilton 57'; Leão 85'	Report	Pica 45'; Ferreira 76'	Stadium: Estádio da Mata Real; Attendance: 1,021; Referee: Marco Cruz

29 July 2018	Arouca	0–0 (3–5 p)	Chaves	Arouca
17:00 WEST (UTC+01:00)		Report		Stadium: Estádio Municipal de Arouca; Attendance: 760; Referee: João Matos
	Penalties
	Massaia (penalty scored); Costa (penalty scored); Kiko (penalty scored); Bertaccini (penalty missed)		(penalty scored) Marcão; (penalty scored) Gallo; (penalty scored) Maraš; (penalty scored) Eustáquio; (penalty scored) Ghazaryan

29 July 2018	Farense	0–2	Estoril	Faro
17:00 WEST (UTC+01:00)		Report	Roberto 19'; Bruno Messi 83'	Stadium: Estádio de São Luís; Attendance: 2,062; Referee: Pedro Ramalho

29 July 2018	Feirense	3–2	Leixões	Santa Maria da Feira
17:00 WEST (UTC+01:00)	Edinho 3', 10'; Sturgeon 56'	Report	13' (pen.) Bura; 90+5' Breitner	Stadium: Estádio Marcolino de Castro; Attendance: 2,371; Referee: Pedro Vilaça

29 July 2018	Varzim	2–0	Moreirense	Póvoa de Varzim
17:00 WEST (UTC+01:00)	Awurum 23'; Ruster 85'	Report		Stadium: Estádio do Varzim SC; Attendance: 1,731; Referee: Gustavo Correia

29 July 2018	Nacional	2–1	Boavista	Funchal
19:45 WEST (UTC+01:00)	Witi 9'; Róchez 63'	Report	Espinho 57'	Stadium: Estádio da Madeira; Attendance: 961; Referee: João Bento

5 August 2018	Portimonense	0–2	Rio Ave	Portimão
16:00 WEST (UTC+01:00)		Report	Gabrielzinho 45+3'; Furtado 90+6'	Stadium: Estádio Municipal de Portimão; Attendance: 1,266; Referee: Claúdio Pereira

6 August 2018	Vitória de Guimarães	0–2	Tondela	Guimarães
20:00 WEST (UTC+01:00)		Report	Arango 26'; Murillo 71'	Stadium: Estádio D. Afonso Henriques; Attendance: 15,593; Referee: António Nobre

== Third round ==
In the third round, the 11 second-round winners plus Vitória de Setúbal, who were given a bye to this round, joined the four top-ranked teams from the 2017–18 Primeira Liga: Porto (1st), Benfica (2nd), Sporting CP (3rd) and Braga (4th). These 16 teams were drawn into four groups of four, each group containing one of the four top-ranked Primeira Liga teams who each host their first two group matches. Group matches were played in a single round-robin format, ensuring that each team played at least one match at home.

For the draw, the teams were seeded into four pots based on their league position in the previous season, with the teams participating in the 2017–18 Primeira Liga being seeded higher regardless of any relegation. The fixtures and match dates were decided by an additional draw.

=== Group A ===
Pos	Team	Pld	W	D	L	GF	GA	GD	Pts	Qualification	BEN	DAV	PAÇ	RAV
1	Benfica	3	2	1	0	5	2	+3	7	Advanced to knockout phase	—	—	2–0	2–1
2	Desportivo das Aves	3	1	2	0	4	1	+3	5		1–1	—	—	3–0
3	Paços de Ferreira	3	0	2	1	1	3	−2	2		—	0–0	—	—
4	Rio Ave	3	0	1	2	2	6	−4	1		—	—	1–1	—

Source: Liga Portugal
Rules for classification: Tiebreakers

15 September 2018	Paços de Ferreira	0–0	Desportivo das Aves	Paços de Ferreira
15:30 WEST (UTC+01:00)		Report		Stadium: Estádio Capital do Móvel; Attendance: 0 (Note: Paços de Ferreira were sentenced to play a match behind closed doors due to fan behaviour the previous season. The club decided not to appeal, which would postpone the ruling.); Referee: Cláudio Pereira

15 September 2018	Benfica	2–1	Rio Ave	Lisbon
18:00 WEST (UTC+01:00)	Salvio 21' (pen.); Silva 50'	Report	60' Carlos Vinícius	Stadium: Estádio da Luz; Attendance: 30,132; Referee: Rui Oliveira

13 October 2018	Desportivo das Aves	3–0	Rio Ave	Vila das Aves
15:00 WEST (UTC+01:00)	Derley 36'; Braga 78'; Rodrigues 88'	Report		Stadium: Estádio do CD Aves; Attendance: 1,134; Referee: Nuno Almeida

5 December 2018	Benfica	2–0	Paços de Ferreira	Lisbon
20:15 WET (UTC±00:00)	Seferovic 12'; Félix 45'	Report		Stadium: Estádio da Luz; Attendance: 17,194; Referee: António Nobre

28 December 2018	Desportivo das Aves	1–1	Benfica	Vila das Aves
21:15 WET (UTC±00:00)	Baldé 49'	Report	Seferovic 69'	Stadium: Estádio do CD Aves; Attendance: 4,957; Referee: Fábio Veríssimo

28 December 2018	Rio Ave	1–1	Paços de Ferreira	Vila do Conde
21:15 WET (UTC±00:00)	Galeno 51'	Report	M. Rodrigues 30' (o.g.)	Stadium: Estádio do Rio Ave; Attendance: 1,078; Referee: Nuno Almeida

=== Group B ===
Pos	Team	Pld	W	D	L	GF	GA	GD	Pts	Qualification	BRA	TON	VSE	NAC
1	Braga	3	3	0	0	11	1	+10	9	Advanced to knockout phase	—	2–1	—	5–0
2	Tondela	3	2	0	1	5	4	+1	6		—	—	—	2–1
3	Vitória de Setúbal	3	0	1	2	4	9	−5	1		0–4	1–2	—	—
4	Nacional	3	0	1	2	4	10	−6	1		—	—	3–3	—

Source: Liga Portugal
Rules for classification: Tiebreakers

15 September 2018	Braga	2–1	Tondela	Braga
20:30 WEST (UTC+01:00)	Sousa 57' (pen.); Martins 78'	Report	Xavier 8'	Stadium: Estádio Municipal de Braga; Attendance: 7,704; Referee: João Capela

16 September 2018	Nacional	3–3	Vitória de Setúbal	Funchal
15:00 WEST (UTC+01:00)	Witi 11', 15'; Hamzaoui 34'	Report	Mendy 40'; Pereira 47'; Allef 81'	Stadium: Estádio da Madeira; Attendance: 605; Referee: Tiago Martins

30 October 2018	Braga	5–0	Nacional	Braga
20:15 WET (UTC±00:00)	Sousa 5', 41'; Sequeira 21'; Paulinho 43', 46'	Report		Stadium: Estádio Municipal de Braga; Attendance: 5,753; Referee: António Nobre

18 November 2018	Vitória de Setúbal	1–2	Tondela	Setúbal
11:45 WET (UTC±00:00)	Zequinha 90' (pen.)	Report	Jaquité 45+1'; Alves 61'	Stadium: Estádio do Bonfim; Attendance: 1,719; Referee: Rui Costa

28 December 2018	Tondela	2–1	Nacional	Tondela
19:00 WET (UTC±00:00)	Ícaro 3'; Arango 85'	Report	Arabidze 20'	Stadium: Estádio João Cardoso; Attendance: 1,088; Referee: Manuel Mota

28 December 2018	Vitória de Setúbal	0–4	Braga	Setúbal
19:00 WET (UTC±00:00)		Report	Paulinho 53', 59'; Eduardo 75'; Pablo 88'	Stadium: Estádio do Bonfim; Attendance: 1,474; Referee: António Nobre

=== Group C ===
Pos	Team	Pld	W	D	L	GF	GA	GD	Pts	Qualification	POR	CHA	VAR	BEL
1	Porto	3	2	1	0	7	4	+3	7	Advanced to knockout phase	—	1–1	4–2	—
2	Chaves	3	2	1	0	5	2	+3	7		—	—	3–1	—
3	Varzim	3	1	0	2	5	8	−3	3		—	—	—	2–1
4	Belenenses SAD	3	0	0	3	2	5	−3	0		1–2	0–1	—	—

Source: Liga Portugal
Rules for classification: Tiebreakers

14 September 2018	Porto	1–1	Chaves	Porto
20:30 WEST (UTC+01:00)	Hernâni 75'	Report	83' Eustáquio	Stadium: Estádio do Dragão; Attendance: 37,708; Referee: Vítor Ferreira

16 September 2018	Varzim	2–1	Belenenses SAD	Póvoa de Varzim
17:30 WEST (UTC+01:00)	Toro 69'; Estrela 90'	Report	Lucca 30'	Stadium: Estádio do Varzim; Attendance: 1,387; Referee: João Malheiro Pinto

31 October 2018	Porto	4–2	Varzim	Porto
19:00 WET (UTC±00:00)	Bazoer 42'; Soares 73'; Payne 73' (o.g.); A. Pereira 86'	Report	Jonathan 30'; Haman 75'	Stadium: Estádio do Dragão; Attendance: 17,824; Referee: João Capela

18 November 2018	Belenenses SAD	0–1	Chaves	Oeiras
15:00 WET (UTC±00:00)		Report	Niltinho 49'	Stadium: Estádio Nacional; Attendance: 360; Referee: Manuel Oliveira

30 December 2018	Belenenses SAD	1–2	Porto	Oeiras
17:00 WET (UTC±00:00)	Mandava 6'	Report	Marega 53'; Soares 63'	Stadium: Estádio Nacional; Attendance: 6,319; Referee: Manuel Oliveira

30 December 2018	Chaves	3–1	Varzim	Chaves
17:00 WET (UTC±00:00)	Niltinho 34'; William 70'; Marcão 76'	Report	Ruster 37'	Stadium: Estádio Municipal de Chaves; Attendance: 2,780; Referee: João Pinheiro

=== Group D ===
Pos	Team	Pld	W	D	L	GF	GA	GD	Pts	Qualification	SCP	EST	FEI	MAR
1	Sporting CP	3	2	0	1	8	4	+4	6	Advanced to knockout phase	—	1–2	—	3–1
2	Estoril	3	2	0	1	4	3	+1	6		—	—	1–2	3–2
3	Feirense	3	2	0	1	6	7	−1	6		1–4	—	—	—
4	Marítimo	3	0	0	3	3	7	−4	0		—	0–1	—	—

Source: Liga Portugal
Rules for classification: Tiebreakers

16 September 2018	Sporting CP	3–1	Marítimo	Lisbon
20:00 WEST (UTC+01:00)	Raphinha 26'; B. Fernandes 54' (pen.), 63'	Report	Correa 61'	Stadium: Estádio José Alvalade; Attendance: 29,573; Referee: Manuel Mota

17 September 2018	Estoril	1–2	Feirense	Estoril
20:15 WEST (UTC+01:00)	Kléber 10' (pen.)	Report	Sampaio 22'; Briseño 45'	Stadium: Estádio António Coimbra da Mota; Attendance: 817; Referee: André Narciso

31 October 2018	Feirense	3–2	Marítimo	Santa Maria da Feira
16:00 WET (UTC±00:00)	Aloísio 30' (o.g.); J. Silva 36', 73'	Report	Aloísio 15'; Valente 57'	Stadium: Estádio Marcolino de Castro; Attendance: 919; Referee: Vítor Ferreira

31 October 2018	Sporting CP	1–2	Estoril	Lisbon
21:15 WET (UTC±00:00)	Wendel 9'	Report	Lima 71'; Pinto 82' (o.g.)	Stadium: Estádio José Alvalade; Attendance: 10,852; Referee: Hélder Malheiro

29 December 2018	Feirense	1–4	Sporting CP	Santa Maria da Feira
19:45 WET (UTC±00:00)	T. Silva 24' (pen.)	Report	Raphinha 5'; B. Fernandes 22'; Dost 60' (pen.); Machado 67' (o.g.)	Stadium: Estádio Marcolino de Castro; Attendance: Rui Costa; Referee: 5,440

29 December 2018	Marítimo	0–1	Estoril	Funchal
19:45 WET (UTC±00:00)		Report	Lima 16' (pen.)	Stadium: Estádio do Marítimo; Attendance: 2,098; Referee: Claúdio Pereira

== Knockout phase ==
The knockout phase was contested as a final-four tournament by the four third-round group winners in one-legged semi-finals and final. All matches were played in a neutral venue, decided before the competition starts. As in the first and second round, games tied at the end of regular time were decided by a penalty shootout with no extra-time being played.

The first semi-final was played between the winners of Groups A (Benfica) and C (Porto), while the second was played between Group B (Braga) and D (Sporting CP) winners. Groups A and B winners (Benfica and Braga, respectively) were designated as the "home" teams (for administrative purposes) in their semi-final clashes as was the winner of the first semi-final in the final. If the team that played at home in the appointed neutral stadium was still in competition, in this case Braga, they were designated the home team regardless of which group or semi-final they played.

All matches were played at Estádio Municipal de Braga, in Braga, with the semi-finals played on 22 and 23 January, and the final on 26 January 2019.

Semi-finals
22 January – Estádio Municipal de Braga
Benfica	1
Porto	3
23 January – Estádio Municipal de Braga
Braga	1 (3)
Sporting CP (p)	1 (4)

Final
26 January – Estádio Municipal de Braga
Porto	1 (1)
Sporting CP	1 (3)

=== Semi-finals ===
22 January 2019
19:45 WET (UTC±00:00)

Benfica	1–3	Porto
Silva 31'	Report	Brahimi 24'; Marega 35'; Fernando 86'

Estádio Municipal de Braga, Braga
Attendance: 22,945
Referee: Carlos Xistra

23 January 2019
19:45 WET (UTC±00:00)

Braga	1–1	Sporting CP
Sousa 3'	Report	Coates 37'
Penalties
R. Horta (penalty missed); Paulinho (penalty missed); Murilo (penalty missed); Marcelo Goiano (penalty scored); Sousa (penalty scored); Claudemir (penalty scored); Ricardo Ryller (penalty missed)	3–4	(penalty missed) Dost; (penalty missed) Coates; (penalty scored) B. Fernandes; (penalty missed) Nani; (penalty scored) Raphinha; (penalty scored) Ristovski; (penalty scored) Jefferson

Estádio Municipal de Braga, Braga
Attendance: 10,087
Referee: Manuel Oliveira

=== Final ===
26 January 2019
19:45 WET (UTC±00:00)

Porto	1–1	Sporting CP
Fernando 79'	Report	Dost 90+2' (pen.)
Penalties
Telles (penalty scored); Militão (penalty missed); Hernâni (penalty missed); Felipe (penalty missed)	1–3	(penalty scored) Dost; (penalty missed) Coates; (penalty scored) B. Fernandes; (penalty scored) Nani

Estádio Municipal de Braga, Braga
Attendance: 25,213
Referee: João Pinheiro
