= 2019 Taça da Liga final =

- Event: 2018–19 Taça da Liga
Porto	Sporting CP
1	1
- Sporting CP won 3–1 on penalties
- Date: 26 January 2019
- Venue: Estádio Municipal de Braga, Braga
- Referee: João Pinheiro
- Attendance: 25,213

The 2019 Taça da Liga final was the final match of the 2018–19 Taça da Liga, the twelfth season of the Taça da Liga. It was played on 26 January 2019 at Estádio Municipal de Braga.

The competition involved the 32 clubs playing in the top two tiers of the Portuguese football league system – 18 from Primeira Liga and 14 from LigaPro – during the 2018–19 season. Reserve sides of Primeira Liga teams that played in the 2018–19 LigaPro were excluded from the competition.

Porto and Sporting CP faced off in the first final involving both teams. After a 1–1 tie, Sporting CP won the final 3–1 after a penalty shootout, thus becoming only the second team (after Benfica) in the competition's history to both defend their title and win multiple Taças da Liga.

== Background ==
For the third consecutive season, this competition featured a final four format with both the semi-finals and the final being played over a space of a few days in the same venue. The Estádio Municipal de Braga hosted all matches. Porto had the chance to win their first Taça da Liga while Sporting CP could be the first team, other than Benfica, to both win the competition multiple times as well as successfully defend the title, having won the previous final.

== Route to the final ==
Being among the top four during the 2017–18 Primeira Liga season, Porto and Sporting CP received byes directly to the third round. Only the top team in each of the four groups advanced to the final four and both teams marginally won their groups. Porto shared the top spot in group C with Chaves both in points and goal difference, the two most important tiebreakers, having only won the group by virtue of more overall goals scored. Meanwhile, Sporting CP had the same number of points in group D as both Estoril and Feirense, having had the best goal difference from the three teams. Porto played in the first semi-final against Benfica winning the match 3–1. The following day Sporting CP drew 1–1 against Braga, the host team, during the 90 minutes in the second semi-final, winning 4–3 on penalties after a series of seven penalty rounds.

Note: In all results below, the score of the finalist is given first (H: home; A: away; N: neutral).

Porto			Round	Sporting CP		
Opponent	Result	Stadium	First round	Opponent	Result	Stadium
Bye			First round	Bye		
Opponent	Result	Stadium	Second round	Opponent	Result	Stadium
Bye			Second round	Bye		
Opponent	Result	Stadium	Third round	Opponent	Result	Stadium
Chaves	1–1 (H)	Estádio do Dragão	Matchday 1	Marítimo	3–1 (H)	Estádio José Alvalade
Varzim	4–2 (H)	Estádio do Dragão	Matchday 2	Estoril	1–2 (H)	Estádio José Alvalade
Belenenses	2–1 (A)	Estádio Nacional	Matchday 3	Feirense	4–1 (A)	Estádio Marcolino de Castro
Group C winners: Team / Pld / W / D / L / GF / GA / GD / Pts; Porto / 3 / 2 / 1 / 0 / 7 / 4 / +3 / 7; Chaves / 3 / 2 / 1 / 0 / 5 / 2 / +3 / 7; Varzim / 3 / 1 / 0 / 2 / 5 / 8 / −3 / 3; Belenenses / 3 / 0 / 0 / 3 / 2 / 5 / −3 / 0			Final standings	Group D winners: Team / Pld / W / D / L / GF / GA / GD / Pts; Sporting CP / 3 / 2 / 0 / 1 / 8 / 4 / +4 / 6; Estoril / 3 / 2 / 0 / 1 / 4 / 3 / +1 / 6; Feirense / 3 / 2 / 0 / 1 / 6 / 7 / –1 / 6; Marítimo / 3 / 0 / 0 / 3 / 3 / 7 / −4 / 0		
Opponent	Result	Stadium	Knockout phase	Opponent	Result	Stadium
Benfica	3–1 (N)	Estádio Municipal de Braga	Semi-finals	Braga	1–1 (4–3p) (A)	Estádio Municipal de Braga

== Match ==
=== Details ===
26 January 2019
19:45 WET (UTC±00:00)

Porto	1–1	Sporting CP
Fernando 79'	Report	Dost 90+2' (pen.)
Penalties
Telles (penalty scored); Militão (penalty missed); Hernâni (penalty missed); Felipe (penalty missed)	1–3	(penalty scored) Dost; (penalty missed) Coates; (penalty scored) B. Fernandes; (penalty scored) Nani

Estádio Municipal de Braga, Braga
Attendance: 25,213
Referee: João Pinheiro

Porto	Sporting CP

GK	26	(Brazil) Vaná
RB	3	(Brazil) Éder Militão
CB	28	(Brazil) Felipe	(yellow card) 45'
CB	33	(Portugal) Pepe
LB	13	(Brazil) Alex Telles
RM	17	(Mexico) Jesús Corona	(yellow card) 25'	(substituted off) 82'
CM	16	(Mexico) Héctor Herrera (c)
CM	10	(Spain) Óliver Torres	(yellow card) 68'	(substituted off) 90+4'
LM	8	(Algeria) Yacine Brahimi
CF	11	(Mali) Moussa Marega	(yellow card) 90+3'
CF	21	(Portugal) André Pereira		(substituted off) 64'
Substitutes:
GK	1	(Spain) Iker Casillas
DF	12	(Portugal) Wilson Manafá
DF	19	(Democratic Republic of the Congo) Chancel Mbemba
MF	6	(Portugal) Bruno Costa
MF	22	(Portugal) Danilo Pereira		(substituted on) 82'
FW	7	(Portugal) Hernâni		(substituted on) 90+4'
FW	37	(Brazil) Fernando		(substituted on) 64'
Manager:
(Portugal) Sérgio Conceição

GK	40	(Brazil) Renan Ribeiro	(yellow card) 90+6'
RB	13	(North Macedonia) Stefan Ristovski	(yellow card) 66'
CB	6	(Portugal) André Pinto	(yellow card) 29'	(substituted off) 53'
CB	4	(Uruguay) Sebastián Coates
LB	9	(Argentina) Marcos Acuña	(yellow card) 35'	(substituted off) 45'
RM	21	(Brazil) Raphinha
CM	86	(Serbia) Nemanja Gudelj		(substituted off) 83'
CM	37	(Brazil) Wendel
LM	8	(Portugal) Bruno Fernandes	(yellow card) 90+5'
CF	17	(Portugal) Nani (c)	(yellow card) 45'
CF	28	(Netherlands) Bas Dost
Substitutes:
GK	19	(France) Romain Salin
DF	5	(Brazil) Jefferson		(substituted on) 45'
MF	25	(Serbia) Radosav Petrović	(yellow card) 86'	(substituted on) 53'
MF	90	(Portugal) Miguel Luís
FW	23	(Mali) Abdoulay Diaby		(substituted on) 83'
FW	29	(Brazil) Luiz Phellype
FW	77	(Cape Verde) Jovane Cabral
Manager:
(Netherlands) Marcel Keizer

Man of the match

- (Algeria) Yacine Brahimi

Assistant referees:
Nuno Eiras
Paulo Vieira
Fourth official:
Manuel Mota
Video assistant referee:
Tiago Martins
Assistant video assistant referee:
Pedro Mota

Match rules

- 90 minutes.
- Penalty shoot-out if scores still level.
- Seven named substitutes.
- Maximum of three substitutions.

== See also ==
- FC Porto–Sporting CP rivalry
- 2018–19 FC Porto season
- 2018–19 Sporting CP season
- 2019 Taça de Portugal final
