= Rüster =

Rüster or Ruster is a surname. Notable people with the surname include:

- Hugo Rüster (1872-??), German Olympic rower
- Mona Rüster, German table tennis player
- Otto Rüster (1895–??), German chess master
- Sébastien Ruster (born 1982), French professional football player
- Ruster (footballer) (born 1996), Brazilian professional football player
