= Miguel Luís =

Portuguese footballer (born 1999)

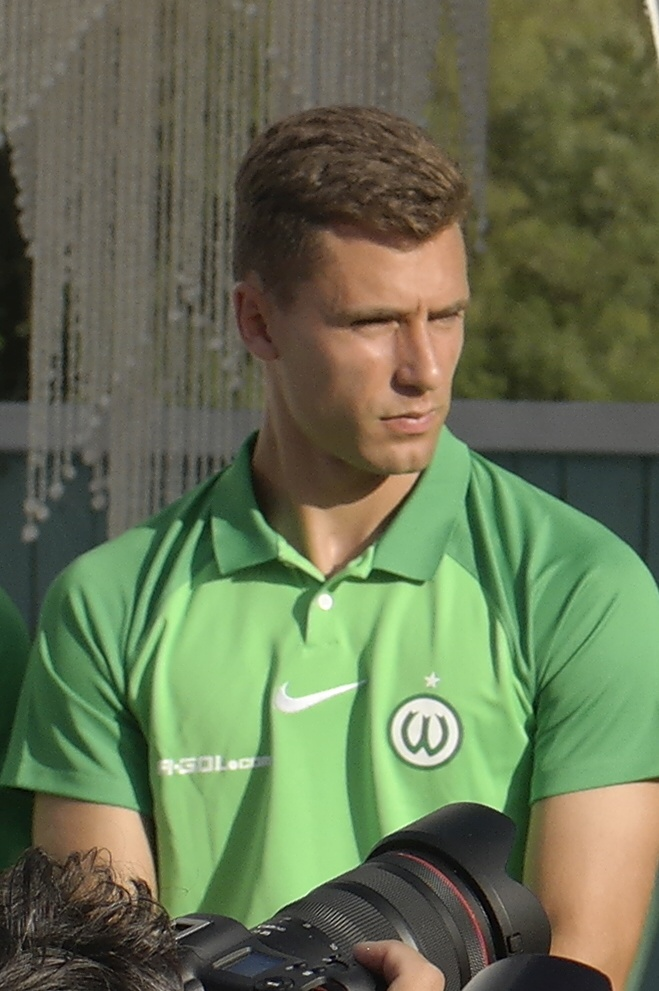
- Luís with Warta Poznań in 2023

Personal information
- Full name: Miguel Mariz Luís
- Date of birth: 27 February 1999 (age 27)
- Place of birth: Coimbra, Portugal
- Height: 1.80 m (5 ft 11 in)
- Position: Midfielder

Youth career
- 2007–2009: Académica
- 2009–2018: Sporting CP

Senior career*
Years	Team	Apps	(Gls)
2017–2018	Sporting CP B	15	(1)
2018–2020	Sporting CP	10	(1)
2020–2021	Vitória Guimarães	18	(0)
2021–2022	Raków Częstochowa	1	(0)
2022	→ Warta Poznań (loan)	14	(3)
2022–2024	Warta Poznań	61	(4)
2024–2026	Panetolikos	36	(2)

International career
2014	Portugal U15	2	(0)
2015	Portugal U16	10	(0)
2015–2016	Portugal U17	16	(5)
2016–2018	Portugal U19	23	(5)
2017–2019	Portugal U20	16	(1)
2019–2020	Portugal U21	6	(0)
Medal record
Men's football
Representing Portugal
UEFA European Under-19 Championship
Winner	2018 Finland
Runner-up	2017 Georgia
UEFA European Under-17 Championship
Winner	2016 Azerbaijan
- * Club domestic league appearances and goals as of 21:00, 30 November 2025 (UTC)

Miguel Mariz Luís (born 27 February 1999) is a Portuguese professional footballer who plays as a midfielder.

== Club career ==
=== Sporting CP ===
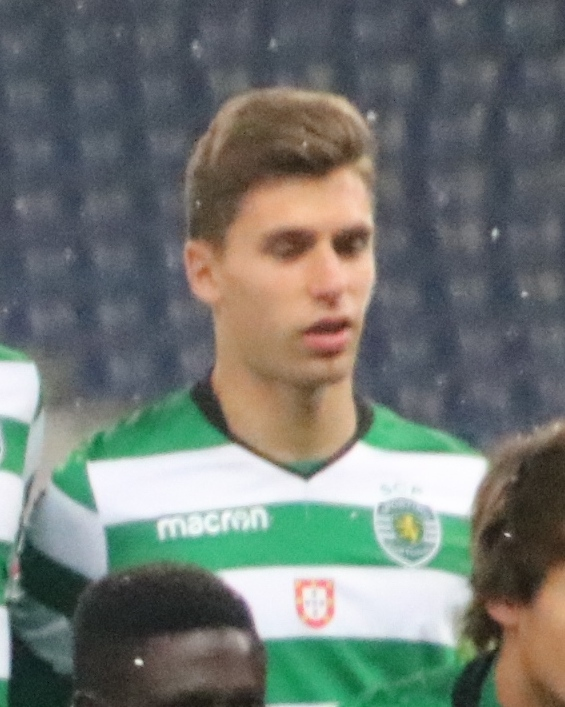
Luís with Sporting CP in 2018

Born in Coimbra, Luís joined Sporting CP's youth ranks at the age of 10, from Académica de Coimbra. He made his professional debut in the LigaPro for the reserves on 6 August 2017 on the first day of the season away to S.C. Covilhã as a 72nd-minute substitute for Bubacar Djaló, scoring the 2–1 winner in added time.

On 4 November 2018, under caretaker manager Tiago Fernandes, Luís made his first-team and Primeira Liga debut for the last seconds of a 2–1 away win against C.D. Santa Clara. Four days later, he made a first start and European bow in a goalless draw at Arsenal in the group stage of the UEFA Europa League. On 13 December, in the same competition, he scored a first goal in a 3–0 victory over FC Vorskla Poltava of Ukraine at the Estádio José Alvalade.

Luís scored his only goal in Portugal's top flight on 3 January 2019, in a 2–1 home defeat of B-SAD.

=== Vitória Guimarães ===
On 6 October 2020, Luís signed a three-year contract with Vitória S.C. on a free transfer, with the option for a two-year extension. He made 21 competitive appearances during his one-year spell (only five starts), going scoreless in the process.

=== Raków Częstochowa ===
Luís joined Raków Częstochowa of the Polish Ekstraklasa on 27 August 2021 on a four-year deal, with Vitória being entitled to 40% of any future transfer (half of that fee belonged to Sporting). He played just one official match during his tenure.

=== Warta Poznań ===
On 8 February 2022, Luís was loaned to Warta Poznań in the same country and league alongside teammates Jordan Courtney-Perkins and Daniel Szelągowski. He scored twice on his second game 12 days later, a 3–1 home win over Radomiak Radom.

Luís agreed to a permanent two-year deal on 27 July 2022. When it expired, he left the club.

=== Panetolikos ===
On 15 August 2024, Luís joined Super League Greece side Panetolikos F.C. on a two-year contract. In December 2025, he suffered a serious knee injury in a game against Iraklis F.C. in the league phase of the domestic cup.

== International career ==
A Portugal international from under-15 level onwards, Luís was part of the under-17 team that won the 2016 UEFA European Championship in Azerbaijan. He scored 5–0 wins over the hosts in the opening game and Austria in the quarter-finals.

Luís was a European runner-up in 2017 and champion in 2018 with the under-19s, netting twice in the group stage of the latter competition in Finland. He earned his first cap for the under-21 side on 5 September 2019, featuring 48 minutes in a 4–0 victory against Gibraltar in the 2021 UEFA European Championship qualifiers.

== Personal life ==
Luís' father, Nuno, was also a professional footballer. A right-back, he represented mainly Académica and S.C. Campomaiorense.

== Career statistics ==
As of match played 25 May 2024

Appearances and goals by club, season and competition
Club	Season	League			National cup (Note: Includes Taça de Portugal, Polish Cup)		League cup (Note: Includes Taça da Liga)		Continental		Total	
Club	Season	Division	Apps	Goals	Apps	Goals	Apps	Goals	Apps	Goals	Apps	Goals
Sporting CP B	2017–18	LigaPro	15	1	—		—		—		15	1
Sporting CP	2018–19	Primeira Liga	8	1	2	0	1	0	3 (Note: Appearances in UEFA Europa League)	1	14	2
Sporting CP	2019–20	Primeira Liga	2	0	1	0	1	0	3	0	7	0
Sporting CP	Total		10	1	3	0	2	0	6	1	21	2
Vitória Guimarães	2020–21	Primeira Liga	18	0	2	0	1	0	—		21	0
Raków Częstochowa	2021–22	Ekstraklasa	1	0	0	0	—		0	0	1	0
Warta Poznań (loan)	2021–22	Ekstraklasa	14	3	0	0	—		—		14	3
Warta Poznań	2022–23	Ekstraklasa	28	2	2	0	—		—		30	2
Warta Poznań	2023–24	Ekstraklasa	33	2	3	1	—		—		36	3
Warta Poznań	Total		75	7	5	1	—		—		80	8
Career total			119	9	10	1	3	0	6	1	138	11

== Honours ==
Sporting CP

- Taça de Portugal: 2018–19
- Taça da Liga: 2018–19

Portugal U17

- UEFA European Under-17 Championship: 2016

Portugal U19

- UEFA European Under-19 Championship: 2018
