= Maikel Santana =

Spanish footballer (born 1991)

Personal information
- Full name: Miguel Santana Luna
- Date of birth: 18 November 1991 (age 34)
- Place of birth: Spain
- Position: Defender

Senior career*
Years	Team	Apps	(Gls)
- Estrella CF
	UD Las Palmas	0	(0)
-2018	UD San Fernando		
2018-2019	Neuchâtel Xamax FCS	4	(0)
2019-2020	UD San Fernando	22	(1)
2020-	FC Saint-Blaise		
- * Club domestic league appearances and goals

Miguel Santana Luna (born 18 November 1991 in Spain) is a Spanish footballer.

== Career ==
After failing to make an appearance with Spanish La Liga side UD Las Palmas, Santana joined UD San Fernando in the fourth division.

In 2018, he signed for Swiss club Neuchâtel Xamax FCS. However, Santana soon sustained an injury in a friendly against an Arabian outfit. which kept him out for 5 months. Despite the president wanting him to leave, Santana managed to play 4 league games, helping the club avoid relegation from the top flight.

In 2020, at the age of 28, he signed for Saint-Blaise in the Swiss amateur leagues to help guide their young players as well as achieve promotion.
