= Fernando Andrade =

Brazilian footballer (born 1993)

Personal information
- Full name: Fernando Andrade dos Santos
- Date of birth: 8 January 1993 (age 33)
- Place of birth: São Caetano do Sul, Brazil
- Height: 1.82 m (6 ft 0 in)
- Positions: Winger; forward

Team information
- Current team: Bodrum
- Number: 10

Youth career
- –2012: São Caetano

Senior career*
Years	Team	Apps	(Gls)
2012–2013	São Caetano	1	(0)
2012	→ Vissel Kobe (loan)	4	(0)
2013	Grêmio Anápolis	6	(0)
2014	Guarani	12	(2)
2015	Rio Branco	18	(3)
2015–2016	Oriental	36	(10)
2016–2017	Penafiel	37	(7)
2017–2019	Santa Clara	49	(15)
2019–2023	Porto	13	(1)
2019–2020	→ Sivasspor (loan)	27	(6)
2020–2021	→ Çaykur Rizespor (loan)	29	(2)
2021	→ Al Fayha (loan)	1	(0)
2022	Porto B	2	(0)
2023–2024	Casa Pia	20	(2)
2024–2025	Sakaryaspor	20	(5)
2025–2026	Amedspor	30	(3)
2026	Erzurumspor	14	(2)
2026–	Bodrum	4	(2)
- * Club domestic league appearances and goals as of 13 October 2026

Fernando Andrade dos Santos, sometimes known as just Fernando (born 8 January 1993) is a Brazilian professional footballer who plays as a winger or forward for Turkish TFF 1. Lig club Bodrum.

== Career ==
=== Early career ===
Andrade made his professional debut for São Caetano on 24 March 2012, in the Campeonato Paulista, coming off the bench at half-time to replace Isael in a 1–0 home defeat to Catanduvense.

In August 2012, São Caetano sent Andrade on loan to J1 League club Vissel Kobe, where he struggled for game time.

After returning from loan, Andrade played in Brazil's state championships for Grêmio Anápolis, Guarani and Rio Branco.

=== Move to Portugal ===
On 8 July 2015, Andrade moved to Portugal, signing a two-year contract with LigaPro side Oriental de Lisboa.

On 6 July 2016, following Oriental's relegation to the Campeonato de Portugal, Andrade stayed in the Portuguese second division, signing a one-year contract with Penafiel.

On 22 June 2017, Andrade signed a two-year contract with fellow Liga Pro club Santa Clara. In his debut season, he scored 11 goals in 36 league appearances, helping the Azores-based side finish second, achieving promotion to the Primeira Liga. The following season, Andrade started the campaign with 4 goals in 15 appearances in all competitions.

=== Porto ===
On 4 January 2019, Andrade joined Portuguese giants FC Porto, signing a contract until the summer of 2023, for a reported fee of €1.5 million. Three days later, he made his debut for the club, replacing Moussa Marega in the final minutes of a 3–1 victory over Nacional at the Estádio do Dragão. On 22 January, in the semi-finals of the Taça da Liga, Andrade scored Porto's third goal in a 3–1 victory over rivals Benfica. Four days later, in the tournament's final against rivals Sporting CP, he scored the opener in the 79th minute; however, Sporting went on to tie the match in stoppage time and beat the Dragons in a penalty shootout. On 25 May 2019, in the final of the Taça de Portugal, also against Sporting CP, Andrade replaced Alex Telles during extra-time; when the game went to penalties after a 2–2 draw, he missed his penalty kick, leading to Porto's defeat.

==== Loans ====
On 9 August 2019, Porto sent Andrade on a season-long loan to Süper Lig club Sivasspor, where he scored 7 goals and provided 2 assists in 29 appearances in all competitions.

On 2 October 2020, Andrade was sent on another season-long loan to Turkey, this time to Çaykur Rizespor, also competing in the Süper Lig, where he scored 2 goals in 30 appearances in all competitions.

On 7 August 2021, Porto sent Andrade on a season-long loan to Saudi Pro League side Al Fayha, with the Saudi club paying a €250.000 loan fee and keeping a €1 million option-to-buy. However, four days later, in his debut, he suffered a serious knee injury. Andrade chose to underwent surgery and spend his recovery time at Porto.

==== Return to Porto ====
On 31 January 2022, still recovering from his knee injury, Andrade's loan to Al Fayha was cancelled and Porto registered him in their league squad.

On 20 March, after seven months on the sidelines, Andrade started for Porto's B team in a 2–2 draw in the Liga Portugal 2 at home to Estrela da Amadora.

On 14 May 2022, after FC Porto had already been crowned Primeira Liga champions the previous week, manager Sérgio Conceição gave Andrade a chance of playing in the league's final match, at home to Estoril, so he could receive a league medal; the Brazilian came on as a substitute in the 85th minute and scored just three minutes later, sealing a 2–0 Porto victory.

During the 2022–23, Andrade didn't play a singe minute for either Porto or Porto B, only making the bench for the former once, being an unused substitute in a 1–0 home victory over Rio Ave.

=== Casa Pia ===
On 1 July 2023, after his contract with Porto had expired, Andrade signed a two-year deal with Primeira Liga club Casa Pia.

== Career statistics ==
As of match played 10 November 2023

Appearances and goals by club, season and competition
Club	Season	League			State league		National cup		League cup		Continental		Total	
Club	Season	Division	Apps	Goals	Apps	Goals	Apps	Goals	Apps	Goals	Apps	Goals	Apps	Goals
São Caetano	2012	Série B	0	0	1 (Note: Appearance in Campeonato Paulista)	0	—		—		—		1	0
Vissel Kobe (loan)	2012	J1 League	4	0	—		0	0	0	0	—		4	0
Grêmio Anápolis	2013	—			6 (Note: Appearances in Campeonato Goiano)	0	—		—		—		6	0
Guarani	2014	Série C	0	0	12 (Note: Appearances in Campeonato Paulista Série A2)	2	1	0	—		—		13	2
Rio Branco	2015	—			18	3	—		—		—		18	3
Oriental	2015–16	LigaPro	36	10	—		2	0	3	1	—		41	11
Penafiel	2016–17	LigaPro	37	7	—		3	0	2	2	—		42	9
Santa Clara	2017–18	LigaPro	36	11	—		4	3	2	1	—		42	15
Santa Clara	2018–19	Primeira Liga	13	4	—		2	0	0	0	—		15	4
Santa Clara	Total		49	15	—		6	3	2	1	—		57	19
Porto	2018–19	Primeira Liga	12	0	—		4	0	2	2	4 (Note: Appearances in UEFA Champions League)	0	22	2
Porto	2021–22	Primeira Liga	1	1	—		0	0	0	0	0	0	1	1
Porto	2022–23	Primeira Liga	0	0	—		0	0	0	0	0	0	0	0
Porto	Total		13	1	—		4	0	2	2	4	0	23	3
Sivasspor (loan)	2019–20	Süper Lig	27	6	—		2	1	—		—		29	7
Çaykur Rizespor (loan)	2020–21	Süper Lig	29	2	—		1	0	—		—		30	2
Al Fayha (loan)	2021–22	Saudi Pro League	1	0	—		0	0	—		—		1	0
Porto B	2021–22	Liga Portugal 2	2	0	—		—		—		—		2	0
Casa Pia	2023–24	Primeira Liga	9	0	—		0	0	2	0	—		11	0
Career total			207	41	37	5	19	4	11	6	4	0	278	56

== Honours ==
Porto

- Primeira Liga: 2021–22
- Taça de Portugal: 2021–22
