= Sanchez José =

Brazilian footballer (born 1995)

Sanchez
Personal information
- Full name: Sanchez José Vale Costa
- Date of birth: 28 September 1995 (age 31)
- Place of birth: Cascavel, Ceará, Brazil
- Height: 1.78 m (5 ft 10 in)
- Position: Left-back

Team information
- Current team: Ceará
- Number: 12

Youth career
- –2015: Ceará

Senior career*
Years	Team	Apps	(Gls)
2015–2017	Ceará	11	(0)
2016	→ Uniclinic (loan)		
2017	→ Cabofriense (loan)	8	(0)
2017–2019	Macaé	18	(1)
2018	→ Inter de Lages (loan)	15	(1)
2019–2020	Arouca	23	(0)
2020	→ Figueirense (loan)	17	(0)
2021–2024	Santa Cruz (N)		
2022	→ Portuguesa-RJ (loan)	13	(2)
2022	→ Vitória (loan)	17	(0)
2023	→ Ferroviária (loan)	2	(0)
2023–2024	→ Volta Redonda (loan)	38	(3)
2025	Volta Redonda	41	(3)
2026	Noroeste	8	(0)
2026–	Ceará	25	(1)
- * Club domestic league appearances and goals as of 18 November 2026

Sanchez José Vale Costa (born 28 September 1995), simply known as Sanchez, is a Brazilian professional footballer who plays as a left-back for Ceará.

== Career ==
A left-back revealed by Ceará, Sanchez played for several Brazilian football clubs, until in 2019 he arrived at Arouca. He also had a notable spell at Vitória in 2022 and Volta Redonda in 2024, where he was part of the squad responsible for the Série C title. In December 2024, Sanchez had his loan contract renewed until the end of 2025.

== Honours ==
Ceará

- Copa do Nordeste: 2015

Volta Redonda

- Campeonato Brasileiro Série C: 2024
