= Stanley Awurum =

Nigerian footballer (born 1990)

Personal information
- Full name: Stanley Ejike Awurum
- Date of birth: 24 June 1990 (age 36)
- Place of birth: Mbieri, Nigeria
- Height: 1.85 m (6 ft 1 in)
- Position: Forward

Team information
- Current team: Salgueiros

Senior career*
Years	Team	Apps	(Gls)
2013–2016	Chibuto		
2015–2016	→ Varzim (loan)	45	(14)
2016–2018	Portimonense	14	(3)
2018	→ Varzim (loan)	20	(7)
2018–2021	Varzim	42	(3)
2019	→ Cova da Piedade (loan)	14	(3)
2021–	Salgueiros	11	(2)
- * Club domestic league appearances and goals as of 7 November 2021

Stanley Ejike Awurum // (born 24 June 1990) is a Nigerian footballer who plays as a forward for Portuguese club Varzim.

== Club career ==
Born in Mbieri, Imo State, Awurum began his senior career in Mozambique, where he was the top scorer with 22 goals for promoted FC Chibuto in the 2013 second division. In January 2015, he joined Varzim S.C. of the Portuguese third tier on a six-month loan. At its conclusion, with the team from Póvoa de Varzim now promoted to the Segunda Liga, he signed a two-year contract.

In his first professional season, Awurum scored 14 goals in 42 games, putting him third in the league's top scorers behind compatriot Simeon Nwankwo of Gil Vicente F.C. and Platiny of C.D. Feirense. Once it finished in May 2016, he joined Portimonense S.C. for a year with the option of three more, turning down an offer from Primeira Liga club S.C. Braga to stay in the second tier.

Having played little part in Portimonense's LigaPro title in 2016–17 and only three top-flight appearances as a substitute, Awurum was loaned back to Varzim in late December 2017, alongside Brazilian strike partner Buba. This move was later made permanent, and in January 2019 he was loaned across the second tier to C.D. Cova da Piedade for six months.

In February 2021, Awurum dropped down to the third-tier Campeonato de Portugal at the age of 30, to play for S.C. Salgueiros.
