= Sebastián Coates =

Uruguayan footballer (born 1990)

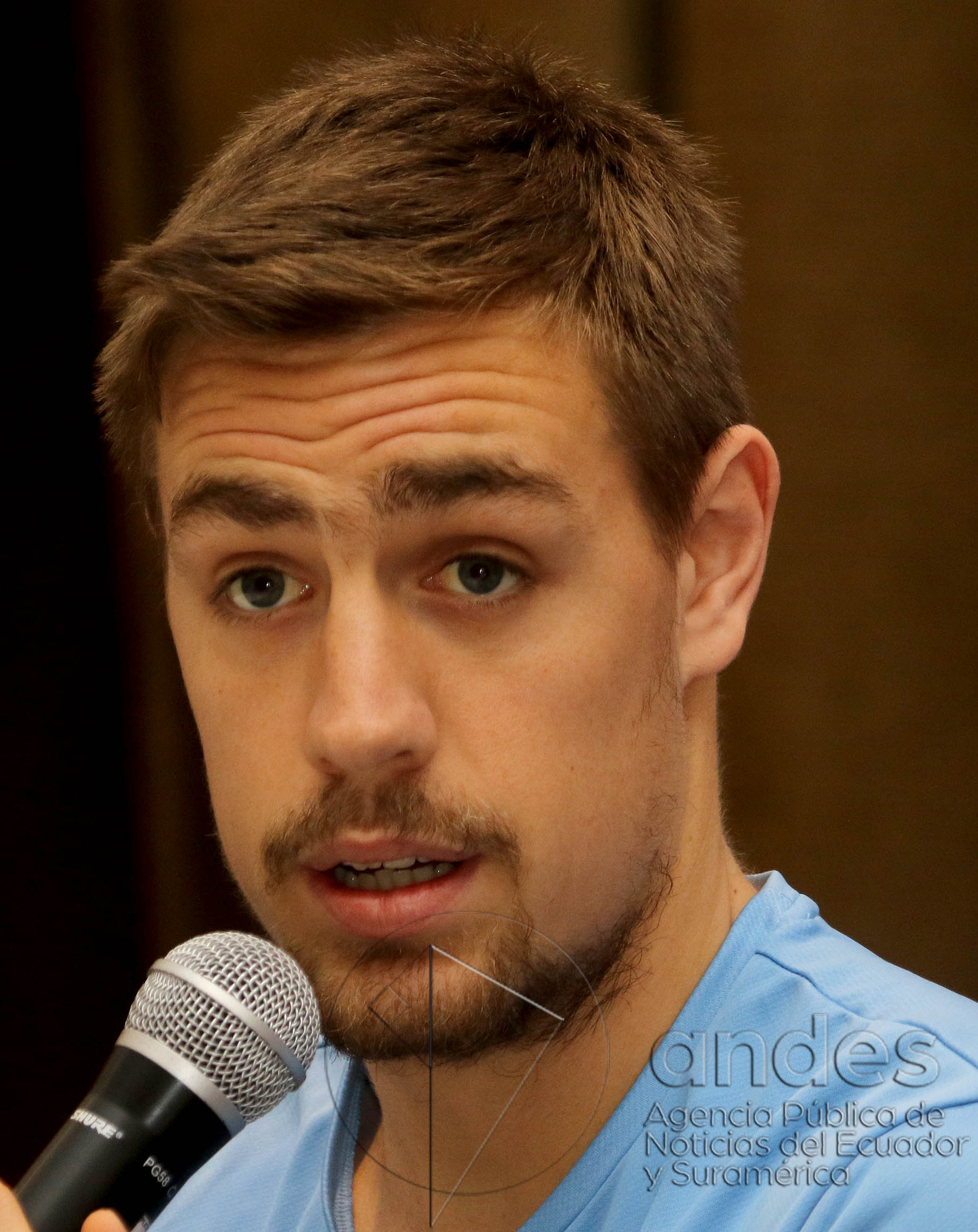
- Coates with Uruguay in 2015

Personal information
- Full name: Sebastián Coates Nion
- Date of birth: 7 October 1990 (age 36)
- Place of birth: Montevideo, Uruguay
- Height: 1.96 m (6 ft 5 in)
- Position: Centre-back

Team information
- Current team: Nacional
- Number: 4

Youth career
- 2001–2009: Nacional

Senior career*
| Years | Team | Apps | (Gls) |
| 2009–2011 | Nacional | 59 | (3) |
| 2011–2015 | Liverpool | 13 | (1) |
| 2014 | → Nacional (loan) | 6 | (0) |
| 2014–2015 | → Sunderland (loan) | 10 | (0) |
| 2015–2017 | Sunderland | 16 | (0) |
| 2016–2017 | → Sporting CP (loan) | 46 | (3) |
| 2017–2024 | Sporting CP | 216 | (19) |
| 2024– | Nacional | 72 | (4) |

International career^{‡}
| 2007 | Uruguay U17 | 4 | (0) |
| 2008–2009 | Uruguay U20 | 17 | (2) |
| 2012 | Uruguay U23 | 5 | (0) |
| 2011–2023 | Uruguay | 51 | (2) |
Medal record
Representing Uruguay
Association football
Copa América
| Winner | 2011 Argentina |
- * Club domestic league appearances and goals as of 20:34, 14 November 2026 (UTC) ‡ National team caps and goals as of 28 March 2023

Sebastián Coates Nion (Spanish pronunciation: [seβasˈtjaŋ koˈates ˈnjon]; born 7 October 1990) is a Uruguayan professional footballer who plays as a centre-back for Uruguayan club Nacional.

Having begun his career at Nacional, where he was a regular from his debut in 2009, Coates joined Liverpool in 2011. He spent time out on loan, back at Nacional, and at Sunderland, and then joined the latter permanently in 2015. In January 2016, he moved to Sporting, initially on loan before signing permanently in February 2017. Following his move, Coates became an important member of the Sporting squad, captaining the side, and leading the club to a number of trophies, including the club's first league title in 19 years during the 2020–21 season.

Coates made his international debut at the 2011 Copa América, and was voted Young Player of the Tournament after Uruguay won the final. He also represented the country at the 2012 Olympics, the FIFA World Cup in 2014, 2018 and 2022, and the Copa América in 2015 and 2019.

== Early life ==
Coates was born in Montevideo. On his paternal side, he is of Scottish ancestry, although his family does not speak English.

== Club career ==
=== Nacional ===
Coates joined Nacional at 11, and worked his way up through the age groups, appearing as captain at every level. In 2009, aged 18, he signed a contract and began playing for the first team. His first appearance came against Bella Vista, a performance for which he was named man of the match by Uruguay's El País. He subsequently started every game for Nacional, notwithstanding suspension and national duty.

=== Liverpool ===
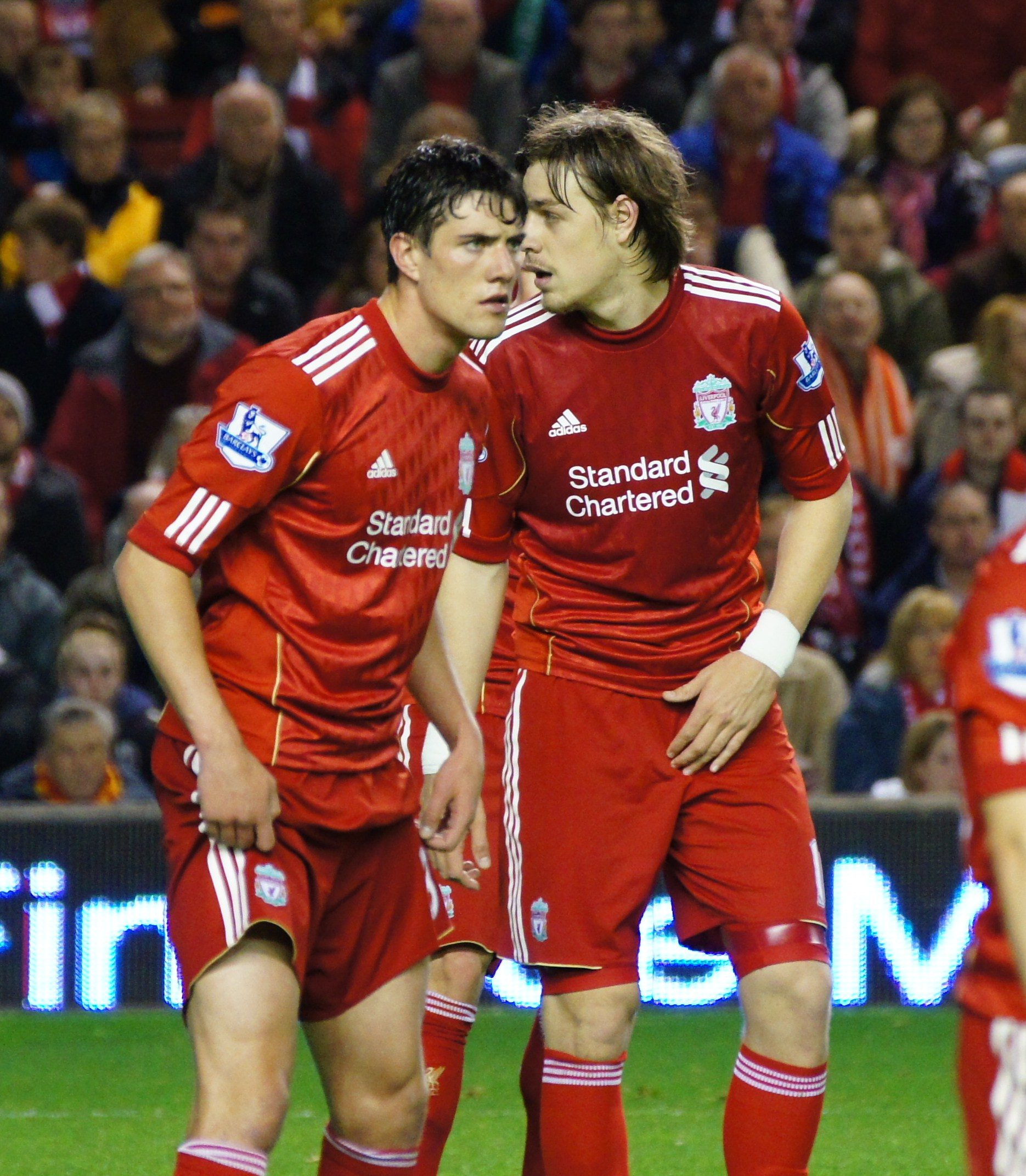
Coates playing alongside Martin Kelly against Fulham in 2012.

In August 2011, Coates was the subject of substantial interest from Premier League club Liverpool. He was given permission to have a medical at Melwood ahead of his proposed move on 26 August, and the following day watched Liverpool's match against Bolton Wanderers. On 30 August, after receiving a work permit, Liverpool announced that they had signed Coates on "a long-term contract" for an undisclosed fee, reported to be around £7 million.

On 18 September, Coates made his debut for Liverpool against Tottenham Hotspur, replacing the injured Daniel Agger in the 27th minute, in a 4–0 defeat. Coates went on to make his first start for the club on 21 September against Brighton & Hove Albion in the League Cup. Liverpool won the match 2–1 and Coates started the next match in this competition against Stoke City which Liverpool also won 2–1. Liverpool progressed through all stages to win the tournament resulting in Coates winning his first medal as a Liverpool player. On 21 March 2012, he scored his first goal for Liverpool against Queens Park Rangers, with a scissor kick from the edge of the box in the 3–2 loss at Loftus Road.

Coates suffered a knee injury playing for Uruguay in a friendly match against Japan in August 2013. The injury sidelined the player for much of the 2013–14 season. The second half of the season saw Coates return to Nacional on loan, helping him to secure a place in Uruguay's World Cup team.

=== Sunderland ===
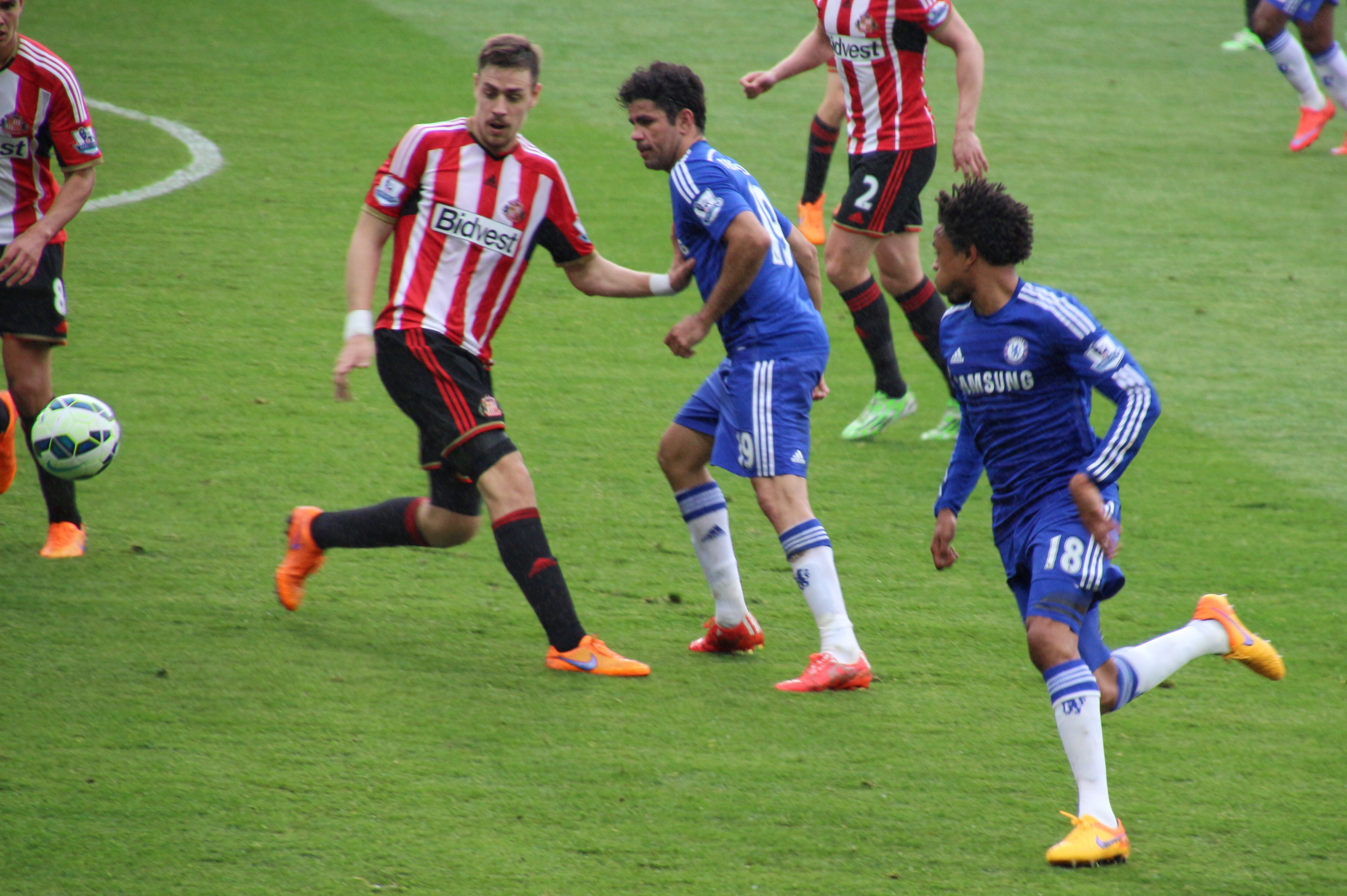
Coates playing for Sunderland against Chelsea in May 2015

On 1 September 2014, Coates was loaned out to fellow Premier League side Sunderland on a season-long loan, joining up with fellow Uruguayan manager Gus Poyet. He made his debut as a starter on the 23rd in the third round of the League Cup, against Stoke City at the Stadium of Light. At half-time, he was substituted for Patrick van Aanholt and Sunderland lost 1–2. His first league match of his loan was on 3 December, playing the entirety of a 1–4 home defeat against Manchester City. Coates had to fill in at left back in the Tyne-Wear derby against Newcastle on 21 December after Anthony Réveillère suffered an injury in the warm up, but coped well as Sunderland won 1–0. However, after Sunderland were beaten 1–3 by Hull in the next game, Coates fell out of favour and failed to make another Premier League start under Poyet. After the manager was sacked and replaced by Dick Advocaat, Coates became more involved. He played every minute of Sunderland's run of five unbeaten games that kept them from relegation with a game to spare.

On 1 July 2015, Sunderland announced that they had signed Coates on a permanent four-year deal for an undisclosed fee reported to be in the region of £2 million. He scored an own goal on 1 November as the team lost 6–2 away to Everton.

=== Sporting CP ===
On 28 January 2016, Coates signed for Sporting CP on loan until the end of the season, as new Black Cats manager Sam Allardyce sought to balance the books. He made his debut on 8 February in a goalless home draw with Rio Ave, and totalled 13 matches (all starts) over the season as the Lisbon-based club came second. On 10 May, his loan was extended for the following campaign.

On the first day of the 2016–17 season, at home to Marítimo, Coates scored his first goal for the Leões to open a 2–0 win by heading in João Mário's corner kick.

He joined Sporting on a permanent basis on 2 February 2017.

In the Taça da Liga final on 26 January 2019, Coates missed his spot-kick but Sporting prevailed over FC Porto 3–1 in the penalty shoot-out to win their second straight league cup title. Four months later in the final of the Taça de Portugal on 25 May, Sporting and Porto again required a penalty shoot-out to determine the winner after the match ended 2–2; Coates converted his kick to help Sporting to a 5–4 win.

On 31 August 2019, Coates conceded three penalties and was sent off as Sporting fell 2–3 to Rio Ave. All three fouls were against Iranian forward Mehdi Taremi.

Coates captained and was a key player for the side that won the 2020–21 Primeira Liga, the club's first league title in 19 years. He was praised for leading a back-line that kept 20 clean sheets and only conceded 20 goals in 34 matches, being awarded as the 2020-21 Primeira Liga's best player.

On 30 November 2023, in a 1–1 UEFA Europa League group stage draw away at Atalanta, Coates played his 343rd match for Sporting CP, overtaking Ânderson Polga as the foreign player with most appearances for the Lions.

== International career ==
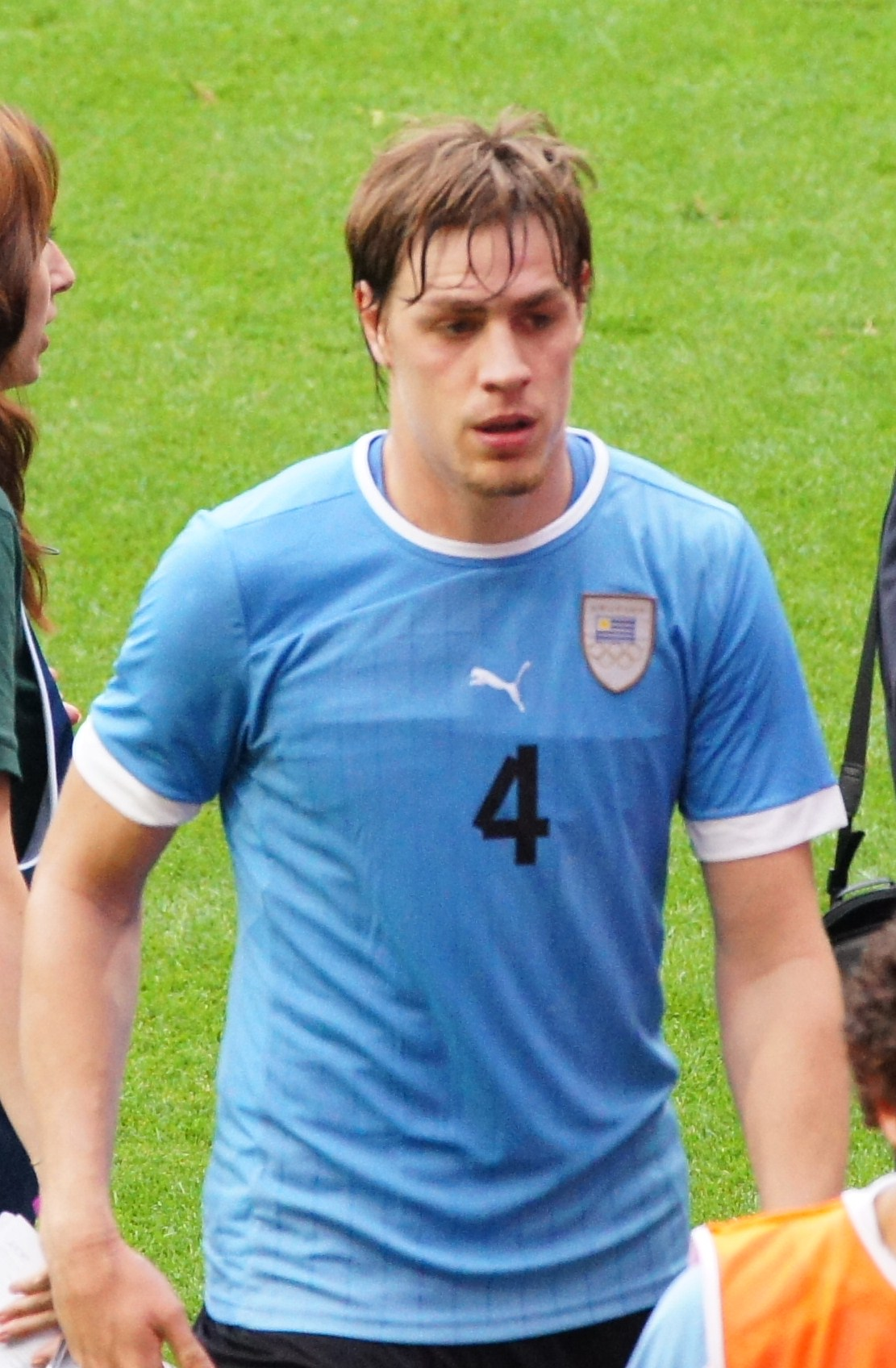
Coates playing for Uruguay at the 2012 Summer Olympics.

After playing for the Uruguay under-20s he was called up for Uruguay's first leg match in the CONMEBOL–CONCACAF playoff against Costa Rica in qualification for the 2010 FIFA World Cup, where he was an unused substitute.

He made his full international debut against Chile in the 2011 Copa América second group match, playing the full 90 minutes of a 1–1 draw at the Estadio Malvinas Argentinas in Mendoza, Argentina. He played the remainder of the tournament, apart from being suspended for their quarter-final win over the hosts, and Coates went on to win the award for the Best Young Player at the end of the tournament, and his nation won the competition.

He was called up by Óscar Tabárez for the Uruguay Olympic football team that played at the 2012 Summer Olympics which were held in London. He played every minute of their campaign, however Uruguay ultimately failed to qualify for the knockout round. At the 2013 FIFA Confederations Cup in Brazil, he made one brief substitute appearance in a 2–1 victory against Nigeria and a start in an 8–0 win against Tahiti in the group, as Uruguay finished the tournament in fourth place.

Although injury saw Coates miss out the entire Premier League season, he made a full recovery in time to be selected in the final 23-man squad for the 2014 FIFA World Cup. He made one appearance as the side reached the last 16, playing two minutes as a substitute for his Liverpool teammate Luis Suárez in the 2–1 group stage victory over England. The following year at the 2015 Copa América in Chile, Coates played Uruguay's final group match, a 1–1 draw against Paraguay, due to the suspension of captain Diego Godín; Uruguay were eliminated in the quarter-finals by the hosts.

In May 2018, he was named in Uruguay's 23 man squad for the 2018 World Cup in Russia.

Coates scored his second goal for Uruguay in a friendly match against South Korea on 28 March 2023.

== Career statistics ==
=== Club ===
As of match played 14 November 2026

Appearances and goals by club, season and competition
| Club | Season | League | | | National cup (Note: Includes FA Cup, Taça de Portugal, Copa Uruguay) | | League cup (Note: Includes Football League Cup, Taça da Liga) | | Continental | | Other | | Total | |
| Club | Season | Division | Apps | Goals | Apps | Goals | Apps | Goals | Apps | Goals | Apps | Goals | Apps | Goals |
|---|---|---|---|---|---|---|---|---|---|---|---|---|---|---|
| Nacional | 2008–09 | Uruguayan Primera División | 11 | 3 | — | | — | | 5 (Note: Appearance(s) in Copa Libertadores) | 1 | — | | 16 | 4 |
| Nacional | 2009–10 | Uruguayan Primera División | 36 | 2 | — | | — | | 8 | 1 | — | | 44 | 3 |
| Nacional | 2010–11 | Uruguayan Primera División | 27 | 1 | — | | — | | 5 | 0 | — | | 32 | 1 |
| Nacional | Total | | 74 | 6 | — | | — | | 18 | 2 | — | | 92 | 8 |
| Liverpool | 2011–12 | Premier League | 7 | 1 | 2 | 0 | 3 | 0 | — | | — | | 12 | 1 |
| Liverpool | 2012–13 | Premier League | 5 | 0 | 2 | 0 | 2 | 0 | 3 (Note: Appearance(s) in UEFA Europa League) | 1 | — | | 12 | 1 |
| Liverpool | Total | | 12 | 1 | 4 | 0 | 5 | 0 | 3 | 1 | — | | 24 | 2 |
| Nacional (loan) | 2013–14 | Uruguayan Primera División | 6 | 0 | — | | — | | 1 | 0 | — | | 7 | 0 |
| Sunderland (loan) | 2014–15 | Premier League | 10 | 0 | 2 | 0 | 1 | 0 | — | | — | | 13 | 0 |
| Sunderland | 2015–16 | Premier League | 16 | 0 | 1 | 0 | 2 | 0 | — | | — | | 19 | 0 |
| Sunderland | Sunderland total | | 26 | 0 | 3 | 0 | 3 | 0 | — | | — | | 32 | 0 |
| Sporting CP (loan) | 2015–16 | Primeira Liga | 13 | 0 | — | | — | | 1 | 0 | — | | 14 | 0 |
| Sporting CP (loan) | 2016–17 | Primeira Liga | 33 | 3 | 2 | 0 | 2 | 0 | 6 (Note: Appearances in UEFA Champions League) | 0 | — | | 43 | 3 |
| Sporting CP | 2017–18 | Primeira Liga | 34 | 2 | 5 | 2 | 4 | 1 | 11 | 0 | — | | 54 | 5 |
| Sporting CP | 2018–19 | Primeira Liga | 31 | 1 | 6 | 0 | 4 | 1 | 8 | 0 | — | | 49 | 2 |
| Sporting CP | 2019–20 | Primeira Liga | 29 | 4 | 0 | 0 | 3 | 0 | 7 | 2 | 1 (Note: Appearance in Supertaça Cândido de Oliveira) | 0 | 40 | 6 |
| Sporting CP | 2020–21 | Primeira Liga | 33 | 5 | 3 | 2 | 2 | 0 | 2 | 0 | — | | 40 | 7 |
| Sporting CP | 2021–22 | Primeira Liga | 30 | 2 | 3 | 1 | 1 | 0 | 6 | 2 | 1 | 0 | 41 | 5 |
| Sporting CP | 2022–23 | Primeira Liga | 30 | 1 | 0 | 0 | 4 | 0 | 10 (Note: Five appearances in UEFA Champions League, five appearances and two goals in UEFA Europa League) | 2 | — | | 44 | 3 |
| Sporting CP | 2023–24 | Primeira Liga | 29 | 4 | 6 | 1 | 2 | 0 | 7 | 1 | — | | 44 | 6 |
| Sporting CP | Sporting total | | 262 | 22 | 25 | 6 | 24 | 2 | 56 | 7 | 2 | 0 | 369 | 37 |
| Nacional | 2024 | Uruguayan Primera División | 14 | 3 | 1 | 0 | — | | 2 | 0 | — | | 17 | 3 |
| Nacional | 2025 | Uruguayan Primera División | 36 | 1 | 0 | 0 | — | | 5 | 1 | 1 (Note: Appearance in Supercopa Uruguaya) | 0 | 42 | 2 |
| Nacional | 2026 | Uruguayan Primera División | 22 | 0 | 1 | 0 | — | | 7 (Note: Six appearances and two goals in Copa Libertadores, one appearance in Copa Sudamericana) | 2 | 1 | 0 | 31 | 2 |
| Nacional | Total | | 72 | 4 | 2 | 0 | — | | 14 | 3 | 2 | 0 | 90 | 7 |
| Career total | | | 452 | 33 | 34 | 6 | 32 | 2 | 92 | 13 | 4 | 0 | 614 | 54 |

=== International ===
As of match played 28 March 2023

Appearances and goals by national team and year
| National team | Year | Apps | Goals |
|---|---|---|---|
| Uruguay | 2011 | 7 | 0 |
| Uruguay | 2012 | 2 | 0 |
| Uruguay | 2013 | 4 | 0 |
| Uruguay | 2014 | 3 | 0 |
| Uruguay | 2015 | 4 | 0 |
| Uruguay | 2016 | 6 | 1 |
| Uruguay | 2017 | 3 | 0 |
| Uruguay | 2018 | 4 | 0 |
| Uruguay | 2019 | 6 | 0 |
| Uruguay | 2020 | 1 | 0 |
| Uruguay | 2021 | 3 | 0 |
| Uruguay | 2022 | 6 | 0 |
| Uruguay | 2023 | 2 | 1 |
| Total | | 51 | 2 |

Scores and results list Uruguay's goal tally first.

List of international goals scored by Sebastián Coates
| No. | Date | Venue | Opponent | Score | Result | Competition |
|---|---|---|---|---|---|---|
| 1. | 10 November 2016 | Estadio Centenario, Montevideo, Uruguay | Ecuador | 1–0 | 2–1 | 2018 FIFA World Cup qualification |
| 2. | 28 March 2023 | Seoul World Cup Stadium, Seoul, South Korea | South Korea | 1–0 | 2–1 | Friendly |

== Honours ==
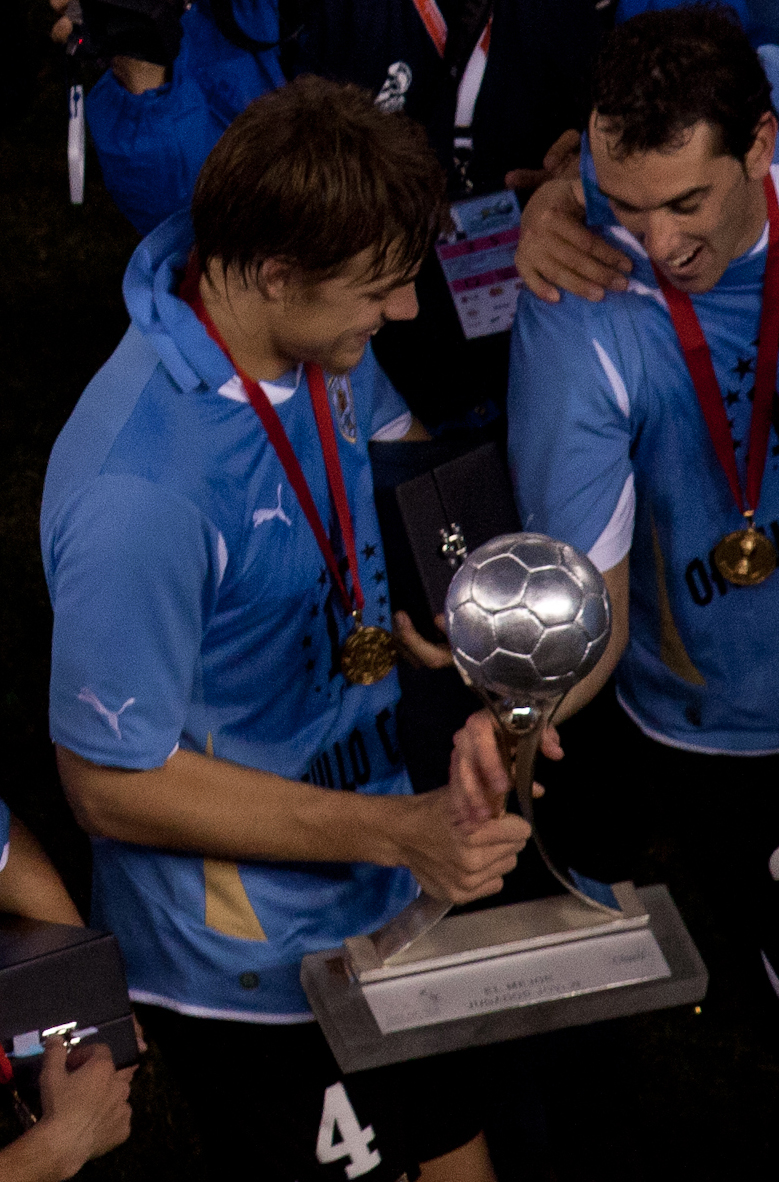
Coates with the Best Young Player of the Copa América award in 2011.

Nacional

- Primera División Uruguaya: 2009, 2011, 2025
- Torneo Intermedio: 2024
- Supercopa Uruguaya: 2025

Liverpool

- Football League Cup: 2011–12

Sporting CP

- Primeira Liga: 2020–21, 2023–24
- Taça de Portugal: 2018–19
- Taça da Liga: 2017–18, 2018–19, 2020–21, 2021–22
- Supertaça Cândido de Oliveira: 2021

Uruguay

- Copa América: 2011

Individual

- Copa América Best Young Player: 2011
- SJPF Primeira Liga Team of the Year: 2016, 2017
- LPFP Primeira Liga Player of the Year: 2020–21
- Sporting CP Player of the Year: 2020
- Primeira Liga Team of the Year: 2020–21, 2023–24
- Primeira Liga Player of the Month: April 2021
