= Sébastien Ruster =

French footballer (born 1982)

Personal information
- Date of birth: September 6, 1982 (age 44)
- Place of birth: Marseille, France
- Height: 1.74 m (5 ft 8 1/2 in)
- Position: Midfielder

Team information
- Current team: US Le Pontet

Senior career*
Years	Team	Apps	(Gls)
2001–2003	AS Cannes		
2003–2004	Swindon Town	2	(0)
2004–2005	ES Fréjus		
2005–2006	Stade Saint-Raphaël		
2008–2009	Stade Saint-Raphaël		
2009–	US Le Pontet		
- * Club domestic league appearances and goals as of 15:54, 25 November 2009 (UTC)

Sébastien Ruster (born September 6, 1982) is a French professional football player. Currently, he plays in the Championnat de France amateur for US Le Pontet.

Ruster started his career with AS Cannes and was released after Cannes lost their professional status. Ruster then joined Swindon Town F.C. in the Football League Second Division. Town released Ruster after Cannes demanded compensation for Ruster's transfer. FIFA agreed with Cannes, but Swindon successfully overturned the initial ruling of 345,000 Euros for the transfer.
