= Willian Dias =

Brazilian footballer (born 1994)

Personal information
- Full name: Willian da Silva Dias
- Date of birth: 10 May 1994 (age 32)
- Place of birth: Porto Ferreira, Brazil
- Height: 1.75 m (5 ft 9 in)
- Position: Attacking midfielder

Team information
- Current team: FK Iskra Danilovgrad

Youth career
- São Carlos

Senior career*
Years	Team	Apps	(Gls)
2011–2016	São Carlos	32	(5)
2016	→ Grêmio Prudente (loan)		
2017	Paulista	15	(2)
2017–2019	Famalicão	47	(9)
2019	Arouca	10	(1)
2019–2021	Varzim	6	(1)
2021–	FK Iskra Danilovgrad	1	(0)
- * Club domestic league appearances and goals as of 23:48, 24 September 2019 (UTC)

Willian da Silva Dias (born 10 May 1994) is a Brazilian footballer who plays for FK Iskra Danilovgrad as an attacking midfielder.

== Club career ==
Born in Porto Ferreira, Dias graduated from the youth academy of local São Carlos Futebol Clube. In 2011, at the age of 17, he made his professional debut for the club in Paulista A2. He scored six goals for the reserve team in the 2014 Campeonato Paulista under-20 championship. After having scored three goals in the 2016 season, he joined Grêmio Prudente on a loan deal on 1 July. On 25 September, he scored his first goal for the club in a 2–1 defeat against Taboão da Serra. In September, he returned to his parent club and was included in the Copa Paulista squad. He switched to Paulista Futebol Clube in January 2017.

Dias switched clubs and countries and moved to Portuguese second tier club F.C. Famalicão on 28 June 2017. On 6 August, he scored his first goal for the club in a 2–0 victory over F.C. Arouca.

On 27 January 2019, Dias joined F.C. Arouca.

== Career statistics ==
As of match played on 13 May 2018

Club statistics
Club	Season	League			National Cup		League Cup		Other		Total	
Club	Season	Division	Apps	Goals	Apps	Goals	Apps	Goals	Apps	Goals	Apps	Goals
São Carlos	2011	Paulista A3	2	0	0	0	—		—		2	0
São Carlos	2013	Paulista A3	0	0	1	0	—		—		1	0
São Carlos	2014	Paulista A3	10	2	0	0	—		—		10	2
São Carlos	2016	Paulista A3	20	3	8	0	—		—		28	3
São Carlos	Total		32	5	9	0	—		—		41	5
Paulista	2017	Paulista A3	15	2	0	0	—		—		15	2
Famalicão	2017–18	LigaPro	34	9	2	0	1	0	—		37	9
Career total			81	16	11	0	1	0	0	0	93	16

== Style of play ==
Dias not only has an attacking role in the team, he can also mark the opposition players.
