= Pedro Kadri =

Brazilian footballer (born 1995)

Personal information
- Full name: Pedro Henrique Vittori El Kadri
- Date of birth: 3 September 1995 (age 31)
- Place of birth: Londrina, Paraná, Brazil
- Height: 1.88 m (6 ft 2 in)
- Position: Centre-back

Youth career
- –2014: Londrina

Senior career*
Years	Team	Apps	(Gls)
2014–2015	Londrina		
2015–2016	Paranavaí		
2016–2017	Louletano	20	(2)
2017–2020	Farense	29	(3)
2020–2021	Oliveirense	13	(0)
2022	Ansar	0	(0)
2022	Nejmeh	1	(0)
Total		63	(5)
- * Club domestic league appearances and goals

Pedro Henrique Vittori El Kadri (born 3 September 1995) is a Brazilian former professional footballer who played as a centre-back.

== Career ==
=== Brazil ===
Having began his career at local club Londrina, Kadri moved to Paranavaí.

=== Portugal ===
Kadri moved to Portugal in 2016, joining Campeonato de Portugal (third tier) side Louletano. He remained one season, before moving to Farense ahead of the 2017–18 season; his contract was renewed for a further year in June 2019. In January 2020, Kadri joined Oliveirense in the Liga Portugal 2 (second tier), with Farense keeping a percentage of a future sale.

=== Lebanon ===
On 10 January 2022, Lebanese Premier League side Ansar announced the signing of Kadri. However, after his contract was terminated shortly after, he signed for cross-city rivals Nejmeh on 26 February.

== Personal life ==
Kadri has Lebanese and Italian origins. He cited former Brazilian defender Lúcio as a reference and idol.
