= André Pinto (footballer, born 1989) =

Portuguese footballer

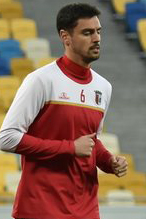
- Pinto with Braga in 2016

Personal information
- Full name: André Almeida Pinto
- Date of birth: 5 October 1989 (age 37)
- Place of birth: Vila Nova de Gaia, Portugal
- Height: 1.96 m (6 ft 5 in)
- Position: Centre-back

Youth career
- 1997–1999: SC Arcozelo
- 1999–2008: Porto
- 2004–2005: → Padroense (loan)

Senior career*
Years	Team	Apps	(Gls)
2008–2012	Porto	0	(0)
2008–2009	→ Santa Clara (loan)	27	(3)
2009–2010	→ Vitória Setúbal (loan)	22	(1)
2010–2011	→ Portimonense (loan)	26	(2)
2011–2012	→ Olhanense (loan)	21	(2)
2012–2013	Panathinaikos	16	(0)
2014	Braga B	3	(0)
2014–2017	Braga	67	(3)
2017–2019	Sporting CP	18	(0)
2019–2020	Al Fateh	12	(0)
2021	Farense	12	(1)
2021	Dinamo București	9	(0)
Total		233	(12)

International career
2004–2005	Portugal U16	8	(1)
2005–2006	Portugal U17	10	(0)
2007	Portugal U18	3	(0)
2007–2008	Portugal U19	11	(0)
2008	Portugal U20	1	(0)
2008–2010	Portugal U21	12	(0)
2011	Portugal U23	1	(0)
2015	Portugal	1	(0)
- * Club domestic league appearances and goals

André Almeida Pinto (born 5 October 1989) is a Portuguese former professional footballer who played as a central defender.

== Club career ==
Born in Vila Nova de Gaia, Porto District, Pinto joined FC Porto's youth academy at the age of 9. As a senior, he would be consecutively loaned for the duration of his contract, to C.D. Santa Clara, Vitória de Setúbal, Portimonense S.C. and S.C. Olhanense. He made his Primeira Liga debut with the second club, his first match in the competition being a 0–4 home loss against U.D. Leiria on 13 September 2009 where he featured the full 90 minutes.

Pinto was sold to Super League Greece side Panathinaikos F.C. in summer 2012, making 22 competitive appearances in his only campaign. He returned to his homeland in late December 2013, signing with S.C. Braga for three and a half years and being initially assigned to the reserves.

In late April 2017, after being ousted from the first-team squad by manager Jorge Simão and subsequently terminating his contract, Pinto agreed to a four-year deal at Sporting CP with a release clause of €45 million, with the move being made effective on 1 July. During his spell at the Estádio José Alvalade, he played second-fiddle to Sebastián Coates and Jérémy Mathieu.

On 30 August 2019, Pinto joined Al Fateh SC of the Saudi Pro League on a one-year contract. On 30 December of the following year, the free agent agreed to a short-team deal at S.C. Farense with the option of extending it for another season.

Pinto signed a one-year contract with Romanian club FC Dinamo București in September 2021.

== International career ==
Pinto earned 45 caps for Portugal at youth level, including 12 for the under-21s. He made his debut with the full side on 31 March 2015, being sent off in the 60th minute of a 2–0 friendly defeat against Cape Verde in Estoril after a foul on Héldon.

== Career statistics ==
=== Club ===
As of 10 January 2018

Club	Season	League		Cup		League Cup		Europe		Other (Note: Includes Supertaça Cândido de Oliveira)		Total	
Club	Season	Apps	Goals	Apps	Goals	Apps	Goals	Apps	Goals	Apps	Goals	Apps	Goals
Porto	2007–08	0	0	0	0	0	0	0	0	—		0	0
Santa Clara (loan)	2008–09	27	3	4	0	1	0	—		—		32	3
Vitória Setúbal (loan)	2009–10	22	1	1	0	0	0	—		—		23	1
Portimonense (loan)	2010–11	26	2	2	0	0	0	—		—		28	2
Olhanense (loan)	2011–12	21	2	3	0	2	0	—		—		26	2
Panathinaikos	2012–13	16	0	2	0	—		4	0	—		22	0
Braga B	2013–14	3	0	—		—		—		—		3	0
Braga	2013–14	2	0	0	0	0	0	0	0	—		2	0
Braga	2014–15	33	1	6	0	1	0	—		—		40	1
Braga	2015–16	22	0	4	0	3	0	7	0	—		36	0
Braga	2016–17	10	2	0	0	1	0	3	1	1	0	15	3
Braga	Total	67	3	10	0	5	0	10	1	1	0	93	4
Sporting CP	2017–18	5	0	3	0	1	0	2	0	—		11	0
Career Total		187	11	25	0	9	0	16	1	1	0	238	12

=== International ===
Appearances and goals by national team and year
National team	Year	Apps	Goals
Portugal	2015	1	0
Total		1	0

== Honours ==
Braga

- Taça de Portugal: 2015–16

Sporting CP

- Taça de Portugal: 2018–19
- Taça da Liga: 2017–18, 2018–19
