= Ruster (footballer) =

Brazilian footballer

Personal information
- Full name: Ruster Santos D'Ajuda
- Date of birth: 24 August 1996 (age 30)
- Place of birth: Trancoso-Porto Seguro, Brazil
- Height: 1.78 m (5 ft 10 in)
- Position: Forward

Team information
- Current team: Olhanense
- Number: 96

Youth career
- 2013–2016: Mogi Mirim

Senior career*
Years	Team	Apps	(Gls)
2015–2017	Mogi Mirim	9	(0)
2017	→ Matonense (loan)	0	(0)
2018	Velo Clube	0	(0)
2018	Mirassol	5	(0)
2018–2019	Varzim	15	(3)
2019–2020	Portimonense	9	(1)
2019–2020	→ Penafiel (loan)	9	(1)
2020	→ Londrina (loan)	10	(1)
2021–	Olhanense	6	(0)
- * Club domestic league appearances and goals as of 20:22, 13 April 2021 (UTC)

Ruster Santos D'Ajuda (born 24 August 1996), commonly known as Ruster, is a Brazilian footballer who currently plays as a forward for S.C. Olhanense.

== Career statistics ==
=== Club ===
As of 20 June 2019.

Club	Season	League			State League		National Cup		League Cup		Other		Total	
Club	Season	Division	Apps	Goals	Apps	Goals	Apps	Goals	Apps	Goals	Apps	Goals	Apps	Goals
Mogi Mirim	2015	Série B	5	0	0	0	0	0	–		0	0	5	0
Mogi Mirim	2016	Série C	0	0	3 (Note: Appearances in the Campeonato Paulista)	0	0	0	–		0	0	3	0
Mogi Mirim	2017	Série C	4	0	0	0	0	0	–		0	0	4	0
Mogi Mirim	Total		9	0	3	0	0	0	0	0	0	0	12	0
Matonense (loan)	2017	–			10 (Note: Appearances in the Campeonato Paulista A3)	1	0	0	–		0	0	10	1
Velo Clube	2018	–			18	3	0	0	–		0	0	18	3
Mirassol	2018	Série D	5	0	0	0	0	0	–		0	0	5	0
Varzim	2018–19	LigaPro	15	3	–		1 (Note: Appearances in the Taça de Portugal)	0	5 (Note: Appearances in the Taça da Liga)	2	0	0	21	5
Portimonense	2018–19	Primeira Liga	9	1	–		0	0	0	0	0	0	9	1
Career total			38	4	31	4	1	0	5	2	0	0	75	10
