= Estádio Marcolino de Castro =

Stadium in Santa Maria da Feira, Portugal

Coordinates: 40°55′36.08″N 8°32′44.93″W

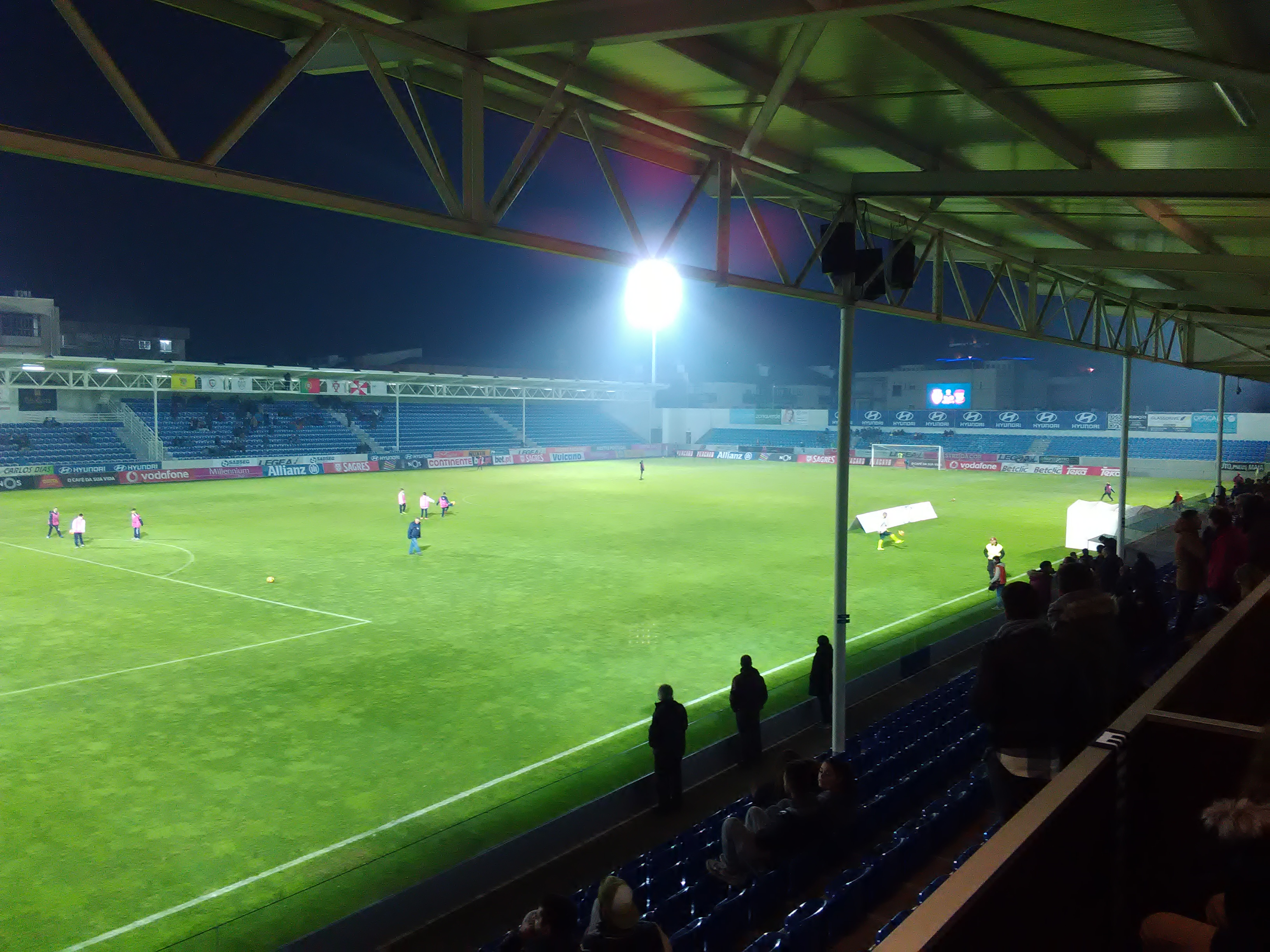
- Interactive map of Estádio Marcolino de Castro
- Full name: Estádio Marcolino de Castro
- Location: Santa Maria da Feira, Portugal
- Owner: CD Feirense
- Capacity: 5,401
- Surface: Grass
- Field size: 105 x 68 m

Construction
- Built: 1962
- Opened: 1962

Tenant
- CD Feirense

Estadio Marcolino de Castro is a multi-use stadium in Santa Maria da Feira, Portugal. It is currently used mostly for football matches and is the home of Segunda Liga club CD Feirense. The stadium is able to hold 5,401 people.

The stadium was built and opened in 1962. The stadium's first ever match was between the home side and Beira-Mar which ended 0–0. It also hosted another game on the opening day of the stadium which was between SC Espinho and Sanjoanense which ended 3–1 to SC Espinho. The stadium was constructed in 1962 because CD Feirense had to move into a bigger ground due to promotion to the Portuguese Liga.
