= 2018–19 Rio Ave F.C. season =

Rio Ave
2018-19 season
- Manager: Miguel Cardoso (until 13 June); José Gomes (13 June - 22 December); Daniel Ramos (from 1 January)
- Stadium: Estádio dos Arcos
- Primeira Liga: 7th
- Taça de Portugal: Fifth round (vs Sporting CP)
- Taça da Liga: Third round
- Top goalscorer: League: Carlos Vinícius (8); All: Carlos Vinícius (14)
Home colours	Away colours	Third colours

The 2018–19 season is Rio Ave's eleventh season back in the Primeira Liga.

== Season events ==
During the pre-season, manager Miguel Cardoso resigned on 13 June 2018, with José Gomes being appointed as his replacement the same day. Six months later, 22 December 2018, Gomes resigned to take the vacant manager's position at English Championship club Reading, with Daniel Ramos being appointed as his replacement on 1 January 2019.

== Squad ==
As of 31 January 2019

Note: Flags indicate national team as defined under FIFA eligibility rules; some limited exceptions apply. Players may hold more than one non-FIFA nationality.

No.	Pos.	Nation	Player
2	DF	BRA	Matheus Reis
3	DF	POR	Rúben Semedo (on loan from Villarreal)
4	DF	POR	Nélson Monte
5	DF	ANG	Jonathan Buatu
6	DF	CRO	Toni Borevković
7	FW	BRA	Murilo
8	MF	POR	Tarantini (captain)
9	FW	POR	Bruno Moreira
10	MF	BRA	Diego Lopes
11	FW	POR	Nuno Santos
12	DF	BRA	Junio (on loan from Internacional)
13	FW	BRA	Carlos
14	FW	GHA	Ahmed Said
17	MF	POR	Fábio Coentrão
18	MF	BRA	Filipe Augusto
19	FW	BRA	Ronan

No.	Pos.	Nation	Player
20	GK	BRA	Léo (on loan from Grêmio)
21	MF	BRA	Leandrinho
22	DF	GBS	Eliseu Cassamá
23	MF	CRO	Nikola Jambor
25	DF	POR	Afonso Figueiredo
26	FW	BRA	Gabrielzinho
29	GK	BRA	Paulo Vítor
30	MF	POR	Joca
33	DF	BRA	Messias (on loan from América)
55	DF	POR	Tiago André
57	FW	ANG	Gelson (on loan from Sporting CP)
81	MF	POR	Víto Ferreira
88	MF	POR	Diogo Teixeira
90	FW	BRA	Galeno (on loan from Porto)
99	MF	BRA	André Silva

=== Out on loan ===
Note: Flags indicate national team as defined under FIFA eligibility rules; some limited exceptions apply. Players may hold more than one non-FIFA nationality.

No.	Pos.	Nation	Player
3	DF	POR	Miguel Rodrigues (at Estoril until 30 June 2019)
91	FW	FRA	Damien Furtado (at Famalicão until 30 June 2019)

No.	Pos.	Nation	Player
—	DF	POR	Silvério (at Varzim until 30 June 2019)
—	FW	CRO	Tomislav Štrkalj (at Rudeš until 30 June 2019)

== Transfers ==
=== In ===
Date	Position	Nationality	Name	From	Fee	Ref.
8 June 2018	DF	(Croatia)	Toni Borevković	Rudeš	Undisclosed	
14 June 2018	MF	(Brazil)	Murilo	Mirassol	Undisclosed	
15 June 2018	DF	(Portugal)	Afonso Figueiredo	Rennes	Undisclosed	
19 June 2018	DF	(Angola)	Jonathan Buatu	Waasland-Beveren	Undisclosed	
25 June 2018	DF	(Brazil)	Matheus Reis	São Paulo	Undisclosed	
7 July 2018	MF	(Croatia)	Nikola Jambor	Slaven Belupo	Undisclosed	
27 July 2018	MF	(Portugal)	Joca	Braga B	Undisclosed	
29 August 2018	GK	(Brazil)	Paulo Vítor	Varzim	Undisclosed	
31 August 2018	DF	(Portugal)	Fábio Coentrão	Real Madrid	Free	
16 January 2019	FW	(Croatia)	Tomislav Štrkalj	NK Osijek	Undisclosed	
30 January 2019	MF	(Brazil)	Filipe Augusto	Benfica	Free	

=== Loans in ===
Start date	Position	Nationality	Name	From	End date	Ref.
26 June 2018	GK	(Brazil)	Léo	Grêmio		
27 June 2018	DF	(Brazil)	Junio	Internacional	End of Season	
6 July 2018	MF	(Brazil)	João Schmidt	Atalanta	2 February 2019	
11 July 2018	FW	(Brazil)	Galeno	Porto	End of season	
17 July 2018	FW	(Angola)	Gelson	Sporting CP	End of season	
24 August 2018	FW	(Brazil)	Carlos Vinícius	Napoli	30 January 2019	
29 January 2019	DF	(Portugal)	Rúben Semedo	Villarreal	End of season	
30 January 2019	DF	(Brazil)	Messias	América Mineiro	June 2020	

=== Out ===
Date	Position	Nationality	Name	To	Fee	Ref.
6 July 2018	MF	(Guinea-Bissau)	Pelé	Monaco	Undisclosed	

=== Loans out ===
Start date	Position	Nationality	Name	To	End date	Ref.
30 August 2018	DF	(Portugal)	Silvério	Varzim	End of season	
16 January 2019	FW	(Croatia)	Tomislav Štrkalj	Rudeš		
23 January 2019	MF	(France)	Damien Furtado	Famalicão	End of season	
29 January 2019	DF	(Portugal)	Miguel Rodrigues	Estoril	End of season	

=== Released ===
Date	Position	Nationality	Name	Joined	Date
15 January 2019	GK	(Georgia (country))	Giorgi Makaridze	Vitória de Setúbal	

== Competitions ==
=== Primeira Liga ===
==== Table ====
Pos	Team	Pld	W	D	L	GF	GA	GD	Pts	Qualification or relegation
5	Vitória de Guimarães	34	15	7	12	46	34	+12	52 (Note: Vitória de Guimarães finished ahead of Moreirense on head-to-head points: Vitória de Guimarães 1–0 Moreirense, Moreirense 1–3 Vitória de Guimarães.)	Qualification for the Europa League second qualifying round (Note: Since the winners of the 2018–19 Taça de Portugal, Sporting CP, qualified for European competition based on league position, the spot awarded to the third-placed team (Europa League third qualifying round) was passed to the fourth-placed team, and the spot awarded to the fourth-placed team (Europa League second qualifying round) was passed to the fifth-placed team.)
6	Moreirense	34	16	4	14	39	44	−5	52	
7	Rio Ave	34	12	9	13	50	52	−2	45	
8	Boavista	34	13	5	16	34	40	−6	44	
9	Belenenses SAD	34	10	13	11	42	51	−9	43	

Source: Liga Portugal
Rules for classification: 1) Points; 2) Head-to-head points; 3) Head-to-head goal difference; 4) Head-to-head away goals scored; 5) Goal difference; 6) Matches won; 7) Goals scored; 8) Play-off.

==== Result summary ====
Overall								Home						Away					
Pld	W	D	L	GF	GA	GD	Pts	W	D	L	GF	GA	GD	W	D	L	GF	GA	GD
34	12	9	13	50	52	−2	45	5	6	6	26	28	−2	7	3	7	24	24	0

Last updated: 18 May 2019.
Source: Results

==== Results ====
12 August 2018 1	Feirense	2–0	Rio Ave	Santa Maria da Feira
16:00 WEST (UTC+1)	Edson Paraíba (yellow card) 12'; T. Silva 20'; Edinho 33'	Report	Cassamá (yellow card) 32'; Gelson (yellow card) 65'	Stadium: Estádio Marcolino de Castro; Referee: António Nobre

19 August 2018 2	Rio Ave	3–1	Marítimo	Vila do Conde
16:00 WEST (UTC+1)	Moreira 12': Gelson 40'; Buatu (yellow card) 72'; Furtado 87'	Report	Bebeto (yellow card) 17'; Baiano (yellow card) 42'; Joel 73' (pen.), (yellow card) 88'	Stadium: Estádio dos Arcos; Referee: Vitor Ferreira

26 August 2018 3	Tondela	1–1	Rio Ave	Tondela
18:30 WEST (UTC+1)	Peña 58'; Fernandes (yellow card) 62'; Monteiro (yellow card) 75'; Tomané (red card) 90+1'	Report	Junio (yellow card) 12'; Galeno 17'; Gelson (yellow card) 30'	Stadium: Estádio João Cardoso; Referee: Manuel Mota

2 September 2018 4	Rio Ave	2–1	Portimonense	Vila do Conde
16:00 WEST (UTC+1)	Borevković (yellow card) 4'; Gabrielzinho 48'; Buatu (yellow card) 52'; Gelson 90+6', (yellow card) 90+7'	Report	Dener (yellow card) 12', (goal) 24'; Manafá (yellow card) 55' (yellow-red card) 86'; Lucas (red card) 59'	Stadium: Estádio dos Arcos; Referee: Artur Soares Dias

22 September 2019 5	Santa Clara	1–3	Rio Ave	Ponta Delgada
16:30 WEST (UTC+1)	Fernando (yellow card) 24'; Vinícius 78' (o.g.); Lucas (red card) 90+1'; César (yellow card) 90+5'	Report	Jambor (yellow card) 19'; Schmidt (yellow card) 31', (goal) 90+5' (pen.); Junio (yellow card) 58' (yellow-red card) 77'; Carlos Vinícius 70'; Galeno 74'	Stadium: Estádio de São Miguel; Referee: João Capela

29 September 2018 6	Rio Ave	2–1	Boavista	Vila do Conde
19:00 WEST (UTC+1)	Carlos Vinícius 14', 40'; Cassamá (yellow card) 42'; Schmidt (yellow card) 86'	Report	Sparagna (red card) 30'; Obiora (yellow card) 60'; Lopes 75'; Simão (yellow card) 90'; Carraça (yellow card) 90'	Stadium: Estádio dos Arcos; Referee: Hugo Miguel

6 October 2018 7	Braga	1–1	Rio Ave	Braga
20:30 WEST (UTC+1)	Horta 27'; Marcelo Goiano (yellow card) 45+2'; Esgaio (yellow card) 62' (yellow-red card) 90+2'; Paulinho (yellow card) 86'; Eduardo (red card) 90+7'	Report	Lopes (yellow card) 6'; Gelson 34'; Galeno (yellow card) 53'; Tarantini (yellow card) 69'; Léo (yellow card) 89'	Stadium: Estádio Municipal de Braga; Referee: Tiago Martins

27 October 2018 8	Rio Ave	1–0	Chaves	Vila do Conde
18:00 WEST (UTC+1)	Galeno 66', (yellow card) 90+3'; Lopes (yellow card) 77'; Coentrão (yellow card) 90+7'	Report	Eustáquio (yellow card) 49'; Paulinho (yellow card) 58'; Perdigão (yellow card) 90+4'	Stadium: Estádio dos Arcos; Referee: Hélder Malheiro

5 November 2018 9	Rio Ave	3–3	Nacional	Vila do Conde
19:00 WET (UTC)	Lopes 7'; Carlos Vinícius 45+4' (pen.), 67'; Reis (yellow card) 60'; Coentrão (yellow card) 90+1'	Report	Gorré 24'; Júlio César (yellow card) 35'; Lopes (yellow card) 45+3'; Camacho (yellow card) 55'; Róchez 79' (pen.); Witi 89'; Marakis (yellow card) 90+1'; Guimarães (yellow card) 90+4'	Stadium: Estádio dos Arcos; Referee: João Pinto

10 November 2018 10	Desportivo das Aves	2–1	Rio Ave	Aves
15:30 WET (UTC)	Soares 16' (pen.); Galo 45+2'; Ferreira (yellow card) 66'; Braga (yellow card) 89'; Amilton (yellow card) 90+2'	Report	Cassamá (red card) 14'; Reis (yellow card) 53'; Lopes (yellow card) 54'; Galeno (yellow card) 62'; Moreira 90+1'	Stadium: Estádio do CD Aves; Referee: Luís Godinho

3 December 2018 11	Rio Ave	1–3	Sporting CP	Vila do Conde
20:15 WET (UTC)	Schmidt 12', (yellow card) 59'; Borevković (yellow card) 60'; Carlos Vinícius (yellow card) 88'	Report	Fernandes 8'; Acuña (yellow card) 15'; Dost 23', (yellow card) 56'; Gudelj (yellow card) 29'; Coates (yellow card) 48'; Diaby (yellow card) 64'; Cabral 72'	Stadium: Estádio dos Arcos; Referee: Carlos Xistra

9 December 2018 12	Vitória de Guimarães	3–2	Rio Ave	Guimarães
17:30 WET (UTC)	André 17' (pen.), 43' (pen.), (yellow card) 79'; Guedes (yellow card) 20'; Pedrão (yellow card) 74', (goal) 87'; Sacko (yellow card) 83'	Report	Carlos Vinícius 22' (pen.); Gabrielzinho 53'; Coentrão (yellow card) 73'; Lopes (yellow card) 86'	Stadium: Estádio D. Afonso Henriques; Referee: Nuno Almeida

16 December 2018 13	Rio Ave	2–2	Belenenses	Vila do Conde
15:00 WET (UTC)	Silva 28' (pen.); Reis (yellow card) 31'; Buatu (yellow card) 45+3'; Coentrão (yellow card) 49'; Gelson 64'	Report	Viana (yellow card) 31'; Licá 58'; Fredy 69' (pen.)	Stadium: Estádio dos Arcos; Referee: Manuel Mota

23 December 2018 14	Porto	2–1	Rio Ave	Porto
15:00 WET (UTC)	Brahimi 16'; Marega 26'; M. Pereira (yellow card) 90+3'	Report	Carlos Vinícius 12'; Coentrão (yellow card) 55' (yellow-red card) 90+3'; Tarantini (yellow card) 55'; Monte (yellow card) 58'	Stadium: Estádio do Dragão; Referee: Tiago Martins

2 January 2019 15	Rio Ave	1–2	Moreirense	Vila do Conde
20:15 WET (UTC)	Carlos Vinícius 33'; Gabrielzinho (yellow card) 36'; Galeno (yellow card) 43'; Coentrão (yellow card) 90+3'	Report	Loum (yellow card) 43'; Tavares 66', 69'; Aurélio (yellow card) 76'; Arsénio (yellow card) 90+3'	Stadium: Estádio dos Arcos; Referee: Fábio Veríssimo

6 January 2019 16	Benfica	4–2	Rio Ave	Lisbon
17:30 WET (UTC)	Seferovic 27', 70'; Félix (yellow card) 30', (goal) 31', 64'; Almeida (yellow card) 46'; Fejsa (yellow card) 88'	Report	Gabrielzinho 17'; Moreira 20', (yellow card) 36'; Cassamá (yellow card) 30'; Reis (yellow card) 58'	Stadium: Estádio da Luz; Referee: Luís Godinho

13 January 2019 17	Rio Ave	1–1	Vitória de Setúbal	Vila do Conde
20:00 WET (UTC)	Galeno 27', (yellow card) 66'; Reis (yellow card) 45+1' (yellow-red card) 63'; Carlos Vinícius (yellow card) 52'; Schmidt (yellow card) 90+1'	Report	Dankler (yellow card) 25'; Artur Jorge (yellow card) 30'; Semedo (yellow card) 52'; Pereira (yellow card) 72', (goal) 84'; Cascardo (yellow card) 90+4'; Rúben Micael (yellow card) 90+6'	Stadium: Estádio dos Arcos; Referee: Manuel Mota

20 January 2019 18	Rio Ave	0–0	Feirense	Vila do Conde
20:00 WET (UTC)		Report	Petkov (yellow card) 13'; Diga (yellow card) 45+1'; Silva (yellow card) 45+2'; Alampasu (yellow card) 81'	Stadium: Estádio dos Arcos; Referee: João Pinheiro

28 January 2019 19	Marítimo	0–2	Rio Ave	Funchal
17:00 WET (UTC)	Pinho (yellow card) 33'; Bebeto (yellow card) 85'; Lucas Áfrico (yellow card) 90'	Report	Lopes (yellow card) 29', (goal) 52'; Silva (yellow card) 69'; Schmidt 90+1' (pen.)	Stadium: Estádio do Marítimo; Referee: Hugo Miguel

1 February 2019 20	Rio Ave	2 – 2	Tondela	Vila do Conde
20:30 WET (UTC)	Galeno 9'; Tarantini (yellow card) 16'; Monte (yellow card) 49'; Moreira 74', (yellow card) 77'; Ronan (yellow card) 90+5'; Schmidt (red card) 90+6'	Report	Delgado 24', (yellow card) 36'; Alves (yellow card) 28' (yellow-red card) 60'; Tomané 52'; Jaquité (yellow card) 77'	Stadium: Estádio dos Arcos; Referee: João Capela

9 February 2019 21	Portimonense	0–1	Rio Ave	Portimão
18:00 WET (UTC)	Lucas (yellow card) 52'; Sá (yellow card) 55'; Paulinho (yellow card) 66' (yellow-red card) 73'; Wellington (yellow card) 68'	Report	Moreira 31'; Murilo (yellow card) 41'	Stadium: Estádio Municipal de Portimão; Referee: Hélder Malheiro

15 February 2019 22	Rio Ave	1–2	Santa Clara	Vila do Conde
20:30 WET (UTC)	Monte (yellow card) 26'; Filipe Augusto (yellow card) 42'; Semedo 45+1'	Report	Ukra (yellow card) 6'; Patrick (yellow card) 9'; Cardoso 27'; Guilherme 64'	Stadium: Estádio dos Arcos; Referee: Vítor Ferreira

24 February 2019 23	Boavista	1–0	Rio Ave	Porto
17:30 WET (UTC)	Costa 12' (pen.); Carraça (yellow card) 32'; Mateus (yellow card) 69'; Neris (yellow card) 70'; Machado (yellow card) 89'	Report	Tarantini (yellow card) 27'; Monte (yellow card) 28'; Filipe Augusto (yellow card) 36' (yellow-red card) 64'; Coentrão (yellow card) 65'; Lopes (red card) 90+6'	Stadium: Estádio do Bessa; Referee: Fábio Veríssimo

3 March 2019 24	Rio Ave	1–2	Braga	Vila do Conde
17:30 WET (UTC)	Jambor (yellow card) 39' (yellow-red card) 56'; Carlos 49'; Coentrão (yellow card) 89'	Report	Silva (yellow card) 29'; Viana (yellow card) 62'; Paulinho 77', (yellow card) 90+3'; Marcelo Goiano (yellow card) 79'; Eduardo 90+1'	Stadium: Estádio dos Arcos; Referee: Artur Soares Dias

8 March 2019 25	Chaves	1–1	Rio Ave	Chaves
20:30 WET (UTC)	William (yellow card) 8'; Djavan (yellow card) 17'; Costinha (yellow card) 24'; Jefferson (yellow card) 35'; Niltinho 82'	Report	Filipe Augusto (yellow card) 8' (yellow-red card) 22'; Semedo 27'; Galeno (yellow card) 33'; Tarantini (yellow card) 36'; Coentrão (yellow card) 40'; Léo (yellow card) 71'; Cassamá (yellow card) 72'; Ronan (yellow card) 90'	Stadium: Municipal Eng. Manuel Branco Teixeira; Referee: Rui Costa

17 March 2019 26	Nacional	0–1	Rio Ave	Funchal
15:00 WET (UTC)	Cerqueira (yellow card) 48'; Gonçalves (yellow card) 70'	Report	Ronan 36'; Carlos (yellow card) 64'; Cassamá (yellow card) 90+5'	Stadium: Estádio da Madeira; Referee: António Nobre

31 March 2019 27	Rio Ave	0–2	Desportivo das Aves	Vila do Conde
17:30 WET (UTC)	Said (yellow card) 21'	Report	Derley (yellow card) 30'; Soares 36' (pen.), (yellow card) 49'; Baldé (yellow card) 56', (goal) 83'; Jorge Fellipe (yellow card) 61'	Stadium: Estádio dos Arcos; Referee: Vítor Ferreira

7 April 2019 28	Sporting CP	3–0	Rio Ave	Lisbon
20:00 WEST (UTC+1)	Luiz Phellype 12'; Fernandes 36' (pen.); Wendel 54'	Report		Stadium: Estádio José Alvalade; Referee: Luís Godinho

14 April 2019 29	Rio Ave	2–1	Vitória de Guimarães	Vila do Conde
15:00 WEST (UTC+1)	Filipe Augusto 31' (pen.); Tarantini (yellow card) 42'; Coentrão (yellow card) 45' (yellow-red card) 90+6'; Santos 48'; Gabrielzinho (yellow card) 69'	Report	Tozé (yellow card) 40', (goal) 88' (pen.); Amoah (yellow card) 66'; Mattheus (yellow card) 77'	Stadium: Estádio dos Arcos; Referee: Manuel Oliveira

20 April 2019 30	Belenenses	1–3	Rio Ave	Lisbon
15:30 WEST (UTC+1)	Ljujić (yellow card) 42'; Sasso 73'; Bergdich (yellow card) 90+4'	Report	Moreira 20', 35'; Filipe Augusto (yellow card) 21'; Borevković 48'	Stadium: Estádio do Restelo; Referee: Nuno Almeida

26 April 2019 31	Rio Ave	2–2	Porto	Vila do Conde
20:30 WEST (UTC+1)	Junio (yellow card) 38'; Jambor (yellow card) 80' (yellow-red card) 90+4'; Santos 84'; Ronan 90+1'	Report	Brahimi 18'; Marega (yellow card) 21', (goal) 22'	Stadium: Estádio dos Arcos; Referee: Artur Soares Dias

3 May 2019 32	Moreirense	1–2	Rio Ave	Moreira de Cónegos
20:30 WEST (UTC+1)	Halliche (yellow card) 28'; Pedro Nuno 36'; Chiquinho (yellow card) 51'	Report	Santos 19'; Junio (yellow card) 57'; Tarantini (yellow card) 62'; Gelson 66'; Semedo (yellow card) 88'	Stadium: Parque Joaquim de Almeida Freitas; Referee: João Pinto

12 May 2019 33	Rio Ave	2–3	Benfica	Vila do Conde
20:00 WEST (UTC+1)	Junio (yellow card) 41'; Coentrão (yellow card) 45+3'; Tarantini (yellow card) 45+4', (goal) 50'; Ronan 84'	Report	Silva 3'; Dias (yellow card) 45+1'; Félix 45+2'; Pizzi 56', (yellow card) 79'; Grimaldo (yellow card) 86'; Vlachodimos (yellow card) 90+1'	Stadium: Estádio dos Arcos; Referee: Hugo Miguel

18 May 2019 34	Vitória de Setúbal	1–3	Rio Ave	Setúbal
15:30 WEST (UTC+1)	Fernandes 53'; Bessa (yellow card) 75'	Report	Moreira 50', 90+1'; Filipe Augusto (yellow card) 69'; Borevković (yellow card) 77'; Said 90+3'	Stadium: Estádio do Bonfim; Referee: Cláudio Pereira

=== Taça de Portugal ===
21 October 2018 Third Round	Torreense	1–5	Rio Ave	Torres Vedras
15:00 WEST (UTC+1)	P. Moreno (yellow card) 24'; Bonifácio 28', (yellow card) 66'; T. Silva (yellow card) 43'; Vaz (yellow card) 58'	Report	Galeno 4'; Lopes 25', (yellow card) 90'; Reis (yellow card) 45'; Carlos Vinícius 56', 65'; Moreira 90'	Stadium: Estádio Manuel Marques

25 November 2018 Fourth Round	Rio Ave	7–0	Silves	Vila do Conde
15:00 WET (UTC)	Schmidt 6', 44'; Lopes 10'; Gelson 26'; Junio (yellow card) 64'; Buatu (yellow card) 74'; Carlos Vinícius 77', 88'; L. Oliveira 90+1' (o.g.)	Report	J. Simões (yellow card) 37'; G. Semedo (red card) 81'	Stadium: Estádio dos Arcos; Referee: Vítor Ferreira

19 December 2018 Fifth Round	Sporting CP	5–2	Rio Ave	Lisbon
19:30 WET (UTC)	Diaby 4', 78'; Gaspar (yellow card) 23'; Dost 32', 62'; Mathieu (yellow card) 35'; Fernandes 42'; Coates (yellow card) 82'; Acuña (yellow card) 85'	Report	Galeno (yellow card) 9'; Gaspar 45' (o.g.); Carlos Vinícius 84' (pen.); Murilo (yellow card) 87'; Coentrão (yellow card) 90+3'	Stadium: Estádio José Alvalade; Referee: João Pinheiro

=== Taça da Liga ===
==== Second round ====
5 August 2018	Portimonense	0–2	Rio Ave	Portimão
16:00 WEST (UTC+1)	Wellington (yellow card) 85'; Ryuki (yellow card) 90+1'	Report	Gabrielzinho 45+3'; Tarantini (yellow card) 90+1'; Furtado 90+6'	Stadium: Estádio Municipal de Portimão; Attendance: 1,266; Referee: Cláudio Pereira

==== Third round ====
Pos	Team	Pld	W	D	L	GF	GA	GD	Pts	Qualification
1	Benfica	3	2	1	0	5	2	+3	7	Advanced to knockout phase
2	Desportivo das Aves	3	1	2	0	4	1	+3	5	
3	Paços de Ferreira	3	0	2	1	1	3	−2	2	
4	Rio Ave	3	0	1	2	2	6	−4	1	

Source: Liga Portugal
Rules for classification: Tiebreakers

15 September 2018 1	Benfica	2–1	Rio Ave	Lisbon
18:00 WEST (UTC+1)	Semedo (yellow card) 16'; Salvio 21' (pen.), (yellow card) 35'; Silva 50'; Samaris (yellow card) 79'	Report	Galeno (yellow card) 37'; Gabrielzinho (yellow card) 51'; Carlos Vinícius 60'; Buatu (yellow card) 90+3'	Stadium: Estádio da Luz; Attendance: 30,132; Referee: Rui Oliveira

13 October 2018 2	Desportivo das Aves	3–0	Rio Ave	Vila das Aves
15:00 WEST (UTC+1)	Derley 36'; V.Gomes (yellow card) 64'; Baldé (yellow card) 76'; Braga 78'; R.Rodrigues (yellow card) 87', (goal) 88'	Report		Stadium: Estádio do CD Aves; Attendance: 1,134; Referee: Nuno Almeida

28 December 2018 3	Rio Ave	1–1	Paços de Ferreira	Vila do Conde
21:15 WET (UTC)	Galeno 51'; Ferreira (yellow card) 72'	Report	Valente (yellow card) 9' (yellow-red card) 67'; M. Rodrigues 30' (o.g.); Pedrinho (yellow card) 63'	Stadium: Estádio dos Arcos; Attendance: 1,078; Referee: Nuno Almeida

=== UEFA Europa League ===
==== Qualifying rounds ====
===== Second qualifying round =====
26 July 2018 First leg	Jagiellonia Białystok (Poland)	1–0	(Portugal) Rio Ave	Białystok, Poland
18:20 WEST (UTC+1)	Machaj 9'; Kwiecień (yellow card) 30'; Romanczuk (yellow card) 76'	Report	Gabrielzinho (yellow card) 80'	Stadium: Białystok City Stadium; Attendance: 13,725; Referee: Ricardo de Burgos Bengoetxea (Spain)

2 August 2018 Second leg	Rio Ave (Portugal)	4–4 (4–5 agg.)	(Poland) Jagiellonia Białystok	Vila do Conde, Portugal
20:00 WEST (UTC+1)	Galeno 27', 45+2', (yellow card) 40'; Gelson 63'; Furtado 84'	Report	Sheridan 6'; Machaj (yellow card) 34'; Romanczuk 56', 79'; Frankowski (yellow card) 62'; Pospíšil 72'; Burliga (yellow card) 87'	Stadium: Estádio dos Arcos; Attendance: 5,930; Referee: Marco Di Bello (Italy)

== Statistics ==
As of match played 18 May 2019

=== Appearances and goals ===
No.	Pos	Nat	Player	Total		Primeira Liga		Taça de Portugal		Taça da Liga		UEFA Europa League	
No.	Pos	Nat	Player	Apps	Goals	Apps	Goals	Apps	Goals	Apps	Goals	Apps	Goals
2	DF	(Brazil) BRA	Matheus Reis	27	0	18+4	0	3	0	0	0	2	0
3	DF	(Portugal) POR	Rúben Semedo	14	2	14	2	0	0	0	0	0	0
4	DF	(Portugal) POR	Nélson Monte	19	0	12+2	0	2	0	1	0	2	0
5	DF	(Angola) ANG	Jonathan Buatu	28	0	19+2	0	2	0	3	0	2	0
6	DF	(Croatia) CRO	Toni Borevković	24	1	19	1	2	0	2	0	1	0
7	MF	(Brazil) BRA	Murilo	12	0	5+4	0	0+2	0	1	0	0	0
8	MF	(Portugal) POR	Tarantini	30	1	22+2	1	2	0	2	0	2	0
9	FW	(Portugal) POR	Bruno Moreira	37	10	19+11	9	0+1	1	3+1	0	1+1	0
10	MF	(Brazil) BRA	Diego Lopes	25	4	17+2	2	3	2	1+1	0	1	0
11	FW	(Portugal) POR	Nuno Santos	8	3	6+2	3	0	0	0	0	0	0
12	DF	(Brazil) BRA	Junio	14	0	10	0	1	0	3	0	0	0
13	FW	(Brazil) BRA	Carlos	7	1	3+4	1	0	0	0	0	0	0
14	FW	(Italy) ITA	Ahmed Said	4	1	1+3	1	0	0	0	0	0	0
17	DF	(Portugal) POR	Fábio Coentrão	22	0	19+1	0	1	0	1	0	0	0
18	MF	(Brazil) BRA	Filipe Augusto	12	1	12	1	0	0	0	0	0	0
19	FW	(Brazil) BRA	Ronan	9	3	3+6	3	0	0	0	0	0	0
20	GK	(Brazil) BRA	Léo	38	0	33	0	3	0	2	0	0	0
21	MF	(Brazil) BRA	Leandrinho	16	0	7+4	0	0	0	3	0	2	0
22	DF	(Guinea-Bissau) GBS	Eliseu Cassamá	28	0	24	0	2	0	1	0	1	0
23	MF	(Croatia) CRO	Nikola Jambor	30	0	13+11	0	1+1	0	2+1	0	0+1	0
25	DF	(Portugal) POR	Afonso Figueiredo	15	0	8+2	0	0+1	0	4	0	0	0
26	FW	(Brazil) BRA	Gabrielzinho	36	4	17+10	3	2+1	0	4	1	2	0
29	GK	(Brazil) BRA	Paulo Vítor	3	0	1	0	0	0	2	0	0	0
30	MF	(Portugal) POR	Joca	3	0	1+2	0	0	0	0	0	0	0
33	DF	(Brazil) BRA	Messias	7	0	5+2	0	0	0	0	0	0	0
57	FW	(Angola) ANG	Gelson	26	7	13+6	5	2+1	1	1+1	0	2	1
77	FW	(Portugal) POR	Ricardo Schutte	1	0	0	0	0	0	0	0	0+1	0
81	MF	(Portugal) POR	Víto Ferreira	4	0	0+3	0	0	0	0+1	0	0	0
90	FW	(Brazil) BRA	Galeno	36	9	23+4	5	3	1	3+1	1	2	2
99	MF	(Brazil) BRA	André Silva	2	0	0+2	0	0	0	0	0	0	0
Players away on loan:
3	DF	(Portugal) POR	Miguel Rodrigues	3	0	0+1	0	0	0	2	0	0	0
91	MF	(France) FRA	Damien Furtado	11	3	0+5	1	0	0	1+3	1	0+2	1
Players who left Rio Ave during the season:
1	GK	(Georgia (country)) GEO	Giorgi Makaridze	2	0	0	0	0	0	0	0	2	0
15	MF	(Brazil) BRA	João Schmidt	25	5	17+2	3	3	2	1+1	0	0+1	0
95	FW	(Brazil) BRA	Carlos Vinícius	20	14	13+1	8	1+2	5	1+2	1	0	0

=== Goal scorers ===
Place	Position	Nation	Number	Name	Primeira Liga	Taça de Portugal	Taça da Liga	UEFA Europa League	Total
1	FW	(Brazil)	95	Carlos Vinícius	8	5	1	0	14
2	FW	(Portugal)	9	Bruno Moreira	9	1	0	0	10
3	FW	(Brazil)	90	Galeno	5	1	1	2	9
4	FW	(Angola)	57	Gelson	5	1	0	1	7
5	MF	(Brazil)	15	João Schmidt	3	2	0	0	5
6	FW	(Brazil)	26	Gabrielzinho	3	0	1	0	4
6	MF	(Brazil)	10	Diego Lopes	2	2	0	0	4
8	FW	(Portugal)	11	Nuno Santos	3	0	0	0	3
8	FW	(Brazil)	19	Ronan	3	0	0	0	3
8	MF	(France)	91	Damien Furtado	1	0	1	1	3
8				Own goal	1	2	0	0	3
12	DF	(Portugal)	3	Rúben Semedo	2	0	0	0	2
13	FW	(Brazil)	13	Carlos	1	0	0	0	1
13	MF	(Brazil)	18	Filipe Augusto	1	0	0	0	1
13	DF	(Croatia)	6	Toni Borevković	1	0	0	0	1
13	MF	(Portugal)	8	Tarantini	1	0	0	0	1
13	FW	(Italy)	14	Ahmed Said	1	0	0	0	1
				TOTALS	50	14	4	4	72

=== Disciplinary record ===
Number	Nation	Position	Name	Primeira Liga		Taça de Portugal		Taça da Liga		UEFA Europa League		Total	
Number	Nation	Position	Name	Yellow card	Red card	Yellow card	Red card	Yellow card	Red card	Yellow card	Red card	Yellow card	Red card
2	(Brazil)	DF	Matheus Reis	6	1	1	0	0	0	0	0	7	1
3	(Portugal)	DF	Rúben Semedo	1	0	0	0	0	0	0	0	1	0
4	(Portugal)	DF	Nélson Monte	4	0	0	0	0	0	0	0	4	0
5	(Angola)	DF	Jonathan Buatu	3	0	1	0	1	0	0	0	5	0
6	(Croatia)	DF	Toni Borevković	3	0	0	0	0	0	0	0	3	0
7	(Brazil)	MF	Murilo	1	0	1	0	0	0	0	0	2	0
8	(Portugal)	MF	Tarantini	8	0	0	0	1	0	0	0	9	0
9	(Portugal)	FW	Bruno Moreira	2	0	0	0	0	0	0	0	2	0
10	(Brazil)	MF	Diego Lopes	5	1	1	0	0	0	0	0	6	1
12	(Brazil)	DF	Junio	6	1	1	0	0	0	0	0	7	1
13	(Brazil)	FW	Carlos	1	0	0	0	0	0	0	0	1	0
14	(Italy)	FW	Ahmed Said	1	0	0	0	0	0	0	0	1	0
17	(Portugal)	DF	Fábio Coentrão	13	2	1	0	0	0	0	0	14	2
18	(Brazil)	MF	Filipe Augusto	7	2	0	0	0	0	0	0	7	2
19	(Brazil)	FW	Ronan	2	0	0	0	0	0	0	0	2	0
20	(Brazil)	GK	Léo	2	0	0	0	0	0	0	0	2	0
22	(Guinea-Bissau)	DF	Eliseu Cassamá	5	1	0	0	0	0	0	0	5	1
23	(Croatia)	MF	Nikola Jambor	5	2	0	0	0	0	0	0	5	2
26	(Brazil)	FW	Gabrielzinho	2	0	0	0	1	0	1	0	4	0
57	(Angola)	FW	Gelson	3	0	0	0	0	0	0	0	3	0
84	(Portugal)	MF	Víto Ferreira	0	0	0	0	1	0	0	0	1	0
90	(Brazil)	FW	Galeno	6	0	1	0	1	0	1	0	9	0
99	(Brazil)	MF	André Silva	1	0	0	0	0	0	0	0	1	0
Players who left Rio Ave during the season:
15	(Brazil)	MF	João Schmidt	4	1	0	0	0	0	0	0	4	1
95	(Brazil)	FW	Carlos Vinícius	2	0	0	0	0	0	0	0	2	0
			TOTALS	93	11	7	0	5	0	2	0	107	11
