= 2018–19 S.L. Benfica season =

Benfica
2018–19 season
- President: Luís Filipe Vieira
- Head coach: Rui Vitória (until 3 January 2019); Bruno Lage (Note: Caretaker manager until 14 January 2019)
- Stadium: Estádio da Luz
- Primeira Liga: 1st
- Taça de Portugal: Semi-finals
- Taça da Liga: Semi-finals
- UEFA Champions League: Group stage
- UEFA Europa League: Quarter-finals
- Top goalscorer: League: Haris Seferovic (23); All: Haris Seferovic (27)
- Highest home attendance: 64,064 v Santa Clara (18 May 2019)
- Lowest home attendance: 16,454 v Arouca (22 November 2018)
- Average home league attendance: 53,824
- Biggest win: Benfica 10–0 Nacional (10 February 2019)
- Biggest defeat: Bayern Munich 5–1 Benfica (27 November 2018)
Home colours	Away colours

The 2018–19 season was Sport Lisboa e Benfica's 115th season in existence and the club's 85th consecutive season in the top flight of Portuguese football. It started with the UEFA Champions League third qualifying round on 7 August 2018 and concluded on 18 May 2019 with Benfica becoming Primeira Liga champions for a record 37th time.

Internationally, Benfica played in the Champions League group stage for the ninth successive time, a Portuguese record ranking fourth all-time. However, with two losses at Estádio da Luz, they set a domestic record of five consecutive home matches without a win in the competition. After finishing third in their group, they moved to the UEFA Europa League knockout phase, where they reached the quarter-finals.

== Season summary ==
=== Pre-Season ===
After a season in which Benfica failed to secure a fifth consecutive league title (penta) and endured a historically poor performance in the UEFA Champions League, the club retained Rui Vitória as head coach for a fourth year.

During the summer transfer window, Benfica signed goalkeeper Odysseas Vlachodimos, defenders Cristian Lema and Germán Conti, midfielders Alfa Semedo and Gabriel, and forwards Nicolás Castillo and Facundo Ferreyra. Departures included Lisandro López, Anderson Talisca, André Horta, Ola John, and Raúl Jiménez.

The team began its pre-season on 10 July with a 3–0 win against FK Napredak Kruševac, followed by a 1–1 draw with Vitória de Setúbal, a 1–0 victory over Sevilla, a 2–2 draw with Borussia Dortmund, a 1–1 draw with Juventus, and a 3–2 loss to Lyon.

=== August-November ===
Benfica played their first official match of the season on 7 August, defeating Fenerbahçe 1–0 in the Champions League third qualifying round first leg. This was followed by a 3–2 home victory over Vitória de Guimarães in the league opener and a 1–1 draw away to Fenerbahçe, which secured progression to the play-off round. Still in August, Benfica won 2–0 away against Boavista, drew 1–1 at home with P.A.O.K. in the first leg of the play-off, drew 1–1 with Sporting, and then won 4–1 away against PAOK to qualify for the Champions League group stage.

In September, Benfica achieved a 4–0 away win over Nacional and a 2–1 home victory against Rio Ave in the Taça da Liga. In the Champions League group stage, they lost 2–0 at home to Bayern Munich. Domestically, they beat Aves 2–0 but drew 2–2 away to Chaves, ending the month two points away from first place.

October began with a 3–2 away win against AEK Athens in the Champions League, followed by a 1–0 home victory over Porto and a 3–0 away win against Sertanense in the Taça de Portugal. However, Benfica then lost 1–0 away to Ajax and 2–0 away to Belenenses SAD in the league. Next month, the team lost 3–1 at home to Moreirense, drew 1–1 at home with Ajax in the Champions League, won 3–1 away at Tondela, and defeated Arouca 2–1 in the Taça de Portugal. The month ended with a 5–1 defeat away to Bayern Munich, finishing November four points behind leaders Porto.

=== December-January ===
In December, Benfica defeated Feirense 4–0 at home, Paços de Ferreira 2–0 in the Taça da Liga, and Vitória de Setúbal 1–0 away. The team also recorded 1–0 victories over AEK Athens in the Champions League and Marítimo in the league, before beating Montalegre 1–0 in the Taça de Portugal round of 16. A 6–2 win against Braga was followed by a 1–1 draw with Aves, leaving Benfica four points behind Porto at the end of the year and eliminated from the Champions League group stage.

The new year began with a 2–0 away defeat to Portimonense, which dropped Benfica to fourth place, seven points from the top of the table and led to the dismissal of head coach Rui Vitória. Caretaker manager Bruno Lage replaced him, overseeing a 4–2 home win against Rio Ave, a 2–0 away victory over Santa Clara, and consecutive 1–0 wins against Vitória de Guimarães, in both the league and the Taça de Portugal quarter-finals. Benfica then lost 3–1 to Porto in the Taça da Liga semi-finals before closing January with a 5–1 home win over Boavista, remaining five points behind Porto in the league.

=== February-March ===
In February, Benfica won twice in the Derby de Lisboa, defeating Sporting 4–2 away in the league and 2–1 at home in the first leg of the Taça de Portugal semi-finals. Then beat Nacional 10–0 at home, defeated Galatasaray 2–1 in Istanbul in the first leg of the Europa League round of 32, and won 4–0 at home against Chaves, finishing the month one point behind Porto.

On 2 March, Benfica visited the Estádio do Dragão for the 24th round of the Primeira Liga, defeating Porto 2–1 to move two points clear at the top of the table. Then lost 1–0 away to Dinamo Zagreb in the first leg of the Europa League round of 16 and drew 2–2 at home with Belenenses SAD, leaving them level on points with Porto. Benfica advanced to the Europa League quarter-finals after a 3–0 extra-time victory over Dinamo Zagreb, and closed March with league wins over Moreirense away and Tondela at home.

=== April-May ===
In April, Benfica were eliminated from the Taça de Portugal following a 1–0 away defeat to Sporting. They responded by winning all four of their league fixtures: 4–1 away against Feirense, 4–2 at home against Vitória de Setúbal, 6–0 at home against Marítimo, and 4–1 away against Braga, extending their lead to two points. In Europe, Benfica defeated Eintracht Frankfurt 4–2 in the first leg of the Europa League quarter-finals, with João Félix scoring a hat-trick, but were eliminated after a 2–0 second-leg defeat in Frankfurt.

In May, Benfica won all of the remaining league matches, defeating Portimonense and Rio Ave away, and Santa Clara at home, to secure its 37th league title and fifth in six seasons. In the second half of the league campaign, the team collected 49 points out of a possible 51, drawing only once.

== Players ==
=== Squad information ===
N	Pos.	Nat.	Name	Age	Since	App	Goals	Ends	Transfer fee	Notes
1	GK	(Belgium)	Svilar	27	2017	20	0	2022	€4.5M	
2	DF	(Argentina)	Conti	32	2018	10	1	2023	€4.7M	
3	LB	(Spain)	Grimaldo	31	2016 (Winter)	117	10	2021	€2.12M	
5	DM	(Serbia)	Fejsa	38	2013	164	2	2021	Undisclosed	
6	CB	(Portugal)	Rúben Dias	29	2017	85	8	2023	Youth system	
7	RB	(France)	Corchia	36	2018	8	0	2019	Undisclosed	On loan from Sevilla
8	CM	(Brazil)	Gabriel	33	2018	34	1	2023	Undisclosed	
10	ST	(Brazil)	Jonas	42	2014	183	137	2020	Free	
11	LW	(Argentina)	F. Cervi	32	2016	116	16	2023	€5.74M	
14	ST	(Switzerland)	Seferovic	34	2017	80	34	2022	€3.9M	
15	LB	(Portugal)	Yuri	29	2018	9	0	2023	Youth system	
17	RW	(Serbia)	Živković	30	2016	84	4	2021	€6M	
18	RW	(Argentina)	Salvio	36	2010–2011; 2012	266	62	2022	€13.5M	Played on loan in the 2010–11 season
20	MF	(Croatia)	Krovinović	31	2017	28	2	2022	€3.5M	
21	CM	(Portugal)	Pizzi	37	2014	230	45	2023	€14M	
22	CM	(Greece)	Samaris	37	2014	162	5	2023	€10M	
23	RB	(Nigeria)	T. Ebuehi	30	2018	0	0	2023	Undisclosed	
27	MF	(Portugal)	Silva	33	2016	100	26	2021	€16.4M	
33	CB	(Brazil)	Jardel (captain)	40	2011 (Winter)	248	16	2021	Undisclosed	
34	RB	(Portugal)	A. Almeida (VC)	36	2012	250	6	2023	Undisclosed	
49	AM	(Morocco)	Taarabt	37	2019	7	0	2020	€4M	
61	DM	(Portugal)	F. Luís	27	2019	14	1	2023	Youth system	Promoted from Benfica B
72	GK	(Russia)	Zlobin	29	2019	0	0	2024	Undisclosed	Promoted from Benfica B
73	FW	(Portugal)	Jota	27	2019	6	0	2022	Youth system	Promoted from Benfica B
79	FW	(Portugal)	João Félix	27	2018	43	20	2023	Youth system	Promoted from Benfica B
83	CM	(Portugal)	Gedson	27	2018	46	3	2023	Youth system	Promoted from Benfica B
97	CB	(Portugal)	Ferro	29	2019	18	3	2023	Youth system	Promoted from Benfica B
99	GK	(Greece)	Odysseas	32	2018	50	0	2023	€2.4M	

- Ordered by squad number.

=== Transfers ===
==== In ====
No.	Pos.	Nat.	Name	Age	Moving from	Type	Transfer window	Ends	Transfer fee	Source
99	GK	(Greece)	Odisseas Vlachodimos	24	(Greece) Panathinaikos	Transfer	Summer	2023	€2.4M	Benfica A Bola
23	DF	(Nigeria)	Tyronne Ebuehi	22	Unattached	Transfer	Summer	2023	Undisclosed	Benfica
15	DF	(Portugal)	Yuri Ribeiro	21	(Portugal) Rio Ave	Loan return	Summer	2023	—	Benfica
2	DF	(Argentina)	Germán Conti	23	(Argentina) Colón	Transfer	Summer	2023	€4.7M	Benfica CMVM
95	MF	(Portugal)	Chiquinho	22	(Portugal) Académica	Transfer	Summer	2023	Undisclosed	Benfica
77	MF	(Portugal)	João Amaral	26	(Portugal) Vitória de Setúbal	Transfer	Summer	2021	Undisclosed	Benfica
30	FW	(Chile)	Nicolás Castillo	25	(Mexico) UNAM	Transfer	Summer	2023	€7.8M	Benfica CMVM
19	FW	(Argentina)	Facundo Ferreyra	27	(Ukraine) Shakhtar Donetsk	Transfer	Summer	2022	€4M	Benfica CMVM
25	DF	(Argentina)	Cristian Lema	28	(Argentina) Belgrano	Transfer	Summer	2023	Undisclosed	Benfica
16	MF	(Guinea-Bissau)	Alfa Semedo	20	(Portugal) Moreirense	Transfer	Summer	2023	€2.5M	Benfica SAPO
7	DF	(France)	Sébastien Corchia	27	(Spain) Sevilla	Loan	Summer	2019	Undisclosed	Sevilla Benfica
8	MF	(Brazil)	Gabriel	24	(Spain) Leganés	Transfer	Summer	2023	Undisclosed	Leganés Benfica

==== Out ====
No.	Pos.	Nat.	Name	Age	Moving to	Type	Transfer window	Transfer fee	Source
8	DF	(Brazil)	Douglas	27	(Spain) Barcelona	Loan return	Summer	—	Sport
—	MF	(Italy)	Bryan Cristante	23	(Italy) Atalanta	Transfer	Summer	€9.5M	A Bola
—	MF	(Brazil)	Talisca	24	(China) Guangzhou Evergrande	Loan	Summer	€5.8M	Guangzhou CMVM
9	FW	(Mexico)	Raúl Jiménez	27	(England) Wolverhampton Wanderers	Loan	Summer	€3M	Wolves CMVM
90	MF	(Portugal)	João Carvalho	21	(England) Nottingham Forest	Transfer	Summer	€15M	Forest Benfica
84	FW	(Portugal)	Diogo Gonçalves	21	(England) Nottingham Forest	Loan	Summer	Undisclosed	Forest Benfica
—	MF	(Portugal)	André Horta	21	(United States) Los Angeles FC	Transfer	Summer	€5.2M	LA FC CMVM
13	GK	(Portugal)	Paulo Lopes	40	Retirement	Contract termination	Summer	—	Record
19	DF	(Portugal)	Eliseu	34	Unattached	Contract termination	Summer	—	SAPO Desporto
40	MF	(Portugal)	João Teixeira	24	(Portugal) Chaves	Transfer	Summer	Free	A Bola
—	MF	(Argentina)	Óscar Benítez	25	(Argentina) Argentinos Juniors	Loan	Summer	Undisclosed	Argentinos Juniors
—	MF	(Peru)	André Carrillo	27	(Saudi Arabia) Al-Hilal	Loan	Summer	Undisclosed	Al-Hilal
—	MF	(Portugal)	Salvador Agra	26	(Spain) Cádiz	Loan	Summer	Undisclosed	Cádiz
77	MF	(Portugal)	João Amaral	26	(Poland) Lech Poznań	Transfer	Summer	Undisclosed	Lech Poznań
26	MF	(Netherlands)	Ola John	26	(Portugal) Vitória de Guimarães	Transfer	Summer	Undisclosed	Benfica Vitória
95	MF	(Portugal)	Chiquinho	23	(Portugal) Moreirense	Transfer	Summer	Undisclosed	A Bola
91	FW	(Portugal)	Heriberto Tavares	21	(Portugal) Moreirense	Loan	Summer	Undisclosed	Maisfutebol
—	DF	(Brazil)	César	25	Unattached	Contract termination	Summer	—	Diário de Notícias
28	DF	(Argentina)	Lisandro López	28	(Italy) Genoa	Loan	Summer	Undisclosed	Benfica
4	DF	(Brazil)	Luisão	37	Retirement	Contract termination	—	—	Benfica
—	MF	(Brazil)	Talisca	24	(China) Guangzhou Evergrande	Transfer	Winter	€19.2M	CMVM
—	MF	(Argentina)	Óscar Benítez	25	(Mexico) Atlético San Luis	Loan	Winter	Undisclosed	Record
—	MF	(Portugal)	Salvador Agra	27	(Poland) Legia Warsaw	Transfer	Winter	Undisclosed	Legia Warsaw
55	MF	(United States)	Keaton Parks	21	(United States) New York City FC	Loan	Winter	Undisclosed	Benfica NYC FC
38	DF	(Brazil)	Marcelo Hermes	23	(Brazil) Cruzeiro	Transfer	Winter	Free	Super FC
12	GK	(Portugal)	Bruno Varela	24	(Netherlands) Ajax	Loan	Winter	Undisclosed	Benfica Ajax
28	DF	(Argentina)	Lisandro López	29	(Argentina) Boca Juniors	Loan	Winter	Undisclosed	Boca Juniors
16	MF	(Guinea-Bissau)	Alfa Semedo	21	(Spain) RCD Espanyol	Loan	Winter	€0.4M	Espanyol A Bola
19	FW	(Argentina)	Facundo Ferreyra	27	(Spain) RCD Espanyol	Loan	Winter	€2M	Espanyol A Bola
30	FW	(Chile)	Nicolás Castillo	25	(Mexico) Club América	Transfer	Winter	€7M	América A Bola
25	DF	(Argentina)	Cristian Lema	28	(Uruguay) Peñarol	Loan	Winter	Undisclosed	A Bola
47	MF	(Sweden)	Erdal Rakip	22	(Sweden) Malmö FF	Transfer	Winter	€0.5M	Malmö Record
9	FW	(Mexico)	Raúl Jiménez	27	(England) Wolverhampton Wanderers	Transfer	Summer	€38M	Wolves CMVM
35	FW	(Serbia)	Luka Jović	21	(Germany) Eintracht Frankfurt	Transfer	Summer	€6M	Eintracht A Bola

=== Appearances and goals ===
No.	Pos	Nat	Player	Total		Primeira Liga		Taça de Portugal		Taça da Liga		Champions League		Europa League	
No.	Pos	Nat	Player	Apps	Goals	Apps	Goals	Apps	Goals	Apps	Goals	Apps	Goals	Apps	Goals
Goalkeepers
1	GK	(Belgium) BEL	Mile Svilar	11	0	0+1	0	6	0	4	0	0	0	0	0
72	GK	(Russia) RUS	Ivan Zlobin	0	0	0	0	0	0	0	0	0	0	0	0
99	GK	(Greece) GRE	Odisseas Vlachodimos	50	0	34	0	0	0	0	0	10	0	6	0
Defenders
2	DF	(Argentina) ARG	Germán Conti	10	1	2+2	0	2	1	1	0	3	0	0	0
3	DF	(Spain) ESP	Álex Grimaldo	54	7	34	4	4	0	1	0	10	2	4+1	1
6	DF	(Portugal) POR	Rúben Dias	55	4	32	3	5	0	3	0	9	0	6	1
7	DF	(France) FRA	Sébastien Corchia	8	0	1+1	0	3	0	0	0	0	0	3	0
15	DF	(Portugal) POR	Yuri Ribeiro	7	0	0	0	2	0	3	0	0	0	2	0
23	DF	(Nigeria) NGR	Tyronne Ebuehi	0	0	0	0	0	0	0	0	0	0	0	0
33	DF	(Brazil) BRA	Jardel	37	3	19	2	4	0	4	0	8	1	2	0
34	DF	(Portugal) POR	André Almeida	53	2	33	2	3	0	4	0	10	0	3	0
97	DF	(Portugal) POR	Ferro	18	3	13	2	0+1	0	0	0	0	0	4	1
Midfielders
5	MF	(Serbia) SRB	Ljubomir Fejsa	33	0	17+1	0	2	0	1	0	9	0	3	0
8	MF	(Brazil) BRA	Gabriel	34	1	14+3	0	6	1	1+2	0	2+2	0	2+2	0
11	MF	(Argentina) ARG	Franco Cervi	38	5	13+7	4	0+2	0	1+1	0	7+3	1	3+1	0
17	MF	(Serbia) SRB	Andrija Živković	30	0	6+10	0	4	0	2	0	1+4	0	2+1	0
18	MF	(Argentina) ARG	Eduardo Salvio	28	6	7+7	2	1+1	0	1+2	1	7	2	1+1	1
20	MF	(Croatia) CRO	Filip Krovinović	9	0	0+4	0	2	0	1	0	0	0	1+1	0
21	MF	(Portugal) POR	Pizzi	55	15	34	13	3+1	0	3	0	9+1	2	2+2	0
22	MF	(Greece) GRE	Andreas Samaris	26	2	16+2	2	2+1	0	1+1	0	0	0	2+1	0
27	MF	(Portugal) POR	Rafa Silva	44	21	21+5	17	2+2	2	2	2	4+3	0	3+2	0
49	MF	(Morocco) MAR	Adel Taarabt	7	0	1+5	0	0+1	0	0	0	0	0	0	0
61	MF	(Portugal) POR	Florentino Luís	14	1	9+2	1	0	0	0	0	0	0	3	0
83	MF	(Portugal) POR	Gedson Fernandes	46	3	11+11	0	1+3	1	3+1	0	9+1	2	5+1	0
Forwards
10	FW	(Brazil) BRA	Jonas	31	15	10+12	11	2+1	2	0+1	0	2	1	1+2	1
14	FW	(Switzerland) SUI	Haris Seferovic	51	27	20+9	23	5	0	4	2	5+3	1	4+1	1
73	FW	(Portugal) POR	Jota	6	0	0+4	0	0+1	0	0	0	0	0	1	0
79	FW	(Portugal) POR	João Félix	45	18	21+7	13	4+2	1	2	1	1+2	0	5+1	3
Players who made an appearance and/or had a squad number but left the team
4	DF	(Brazil) BRA	Luisão	0	0	0	0	0	0	0	0	0	0	0	0
12	GK	(Portugal) POR	Bruno Varela	0	0	0	0	0	0	0	0	0	0	0	0
16	MF	(Guinea-Bissau) GBS	Alfa Semedo	16	1	0+5	0	3	0	2+1	0	1+4	1	0	0
19	FW	(Argentina) ARG	Facundo Ferreyra	9	1	3+2	1	0+1	0	0	0	2+1	0	0	0
25	DF	(Argentina) ARG	Cristian Lema	2	0	1	0	0	0	0	0	1	0	0	0
30	FW	(Chile) CHI	Nicolás Castillo	11	0	1+3	0	0+1	0	0+3	0	1+2	0	0	0

== Technical staff ==
As of 15 January 2019

Position	Name
Head coach	Bruno Lage
Assistant coaches	Nélson Veríssimo; Minervino Pietra; Marco Pedroso
Video analyst	Jhony Conceição
Fitness coach	Alexandre Silva
Goalkeeping coach	Fernando Ferreira

Last updated: January 2019

== Pre-season friendlies ==
On 15 May 2018, Benfica announced their pre-season schedule (updated on 28 June), which included the following matches: Win Draw Loss

10 July 2018 Torneio Internacional do Sado	Benfica	3–0 (4–3 p)	Napredak Kruševac	Setúbal, Portugal
19:00 WEST	Castillo 18'; Jardel 22', 41'			Stadium: Estádio do Bonfim; Attendance: 2,000; Referee: André Narciso (Setúbal)
	Penalties
	Chiquinho (penalty scored); Lema (penalty missed); Jonas (penalty scored); Ferreyra (penalty scored); Parks (penalty scored)		(penalty scored) Vukanović; (penalty missed) Boranijašević; (penalty missed) Markoski; (penalty scored) Rušević; (penalty scored) Petrović

13 July 2018 Torneio Internacional do Sado	Vitória de Setúbal	1–1	Benfica	Setúbal, Portugal
20:30 WEST	Semedo (yellow card) 37'; Fernandes 54'		Jonas (yellow card) 31'; Ferreyra 33'; Semedo (yellow card) 81'	Stadium: Estádio do Bonfim; Attendance: 5,000; Referee: João Malheiro Pinto (Lisbon)

21 July 2018 Friendly	Sevilla	0–1	Benfica	Zürich, Switzerland
18:00 CEST	Arana (yellow card) 60'; Mesa (yellow card) 73'		Castillo 57'; Dias (yellow card) 73'	Stadium: Letzigrund; Attendance: 4,400; Referee: Lukas Fähndrich (Switzerland)

25 July 2018 International Champions Cup	Borussia Dortmund	2–2 (3–4 p)	Benfica	Pittsburgh, Pennsylvania, United States
20:05 EDT	Philipp 20', 22'; Achraf (yellow card) 64'; Pieper (yellow card) 90+1'		Živković (yellow card) 17'; Grimaldo (yellow card) 28'; Almeida 51'; Semedo 69'	Stadium: Heinz Field; Attendance: 16,171; Referee: Nima Saghafi (United States)
	Penalties
	Wolf (penalty scored); Gómez (penalty missed); Burnić (penalty scored); Sancho (penalty scored); Isak (penalty missed)		(penalty scored) Lema; (penalty scored) Jonas; (penalty scored) Ferreyra; (penalty missed) Samaris; (penalty scored) Salvio

28 July 2018 International Champions Cup	Benfica	1–1 (2–4 p)	Juventus	Harrison, New Jersey, United States
13:05 EDT	Grimaldo 65'; Parks (yellow card) 83'		Clemenza 84'	Stadium: Red Bull Arena; Attendance: 24,194; Referee: José Carlos Rivero (United States)
	Penalties
	Parks (penalty scored); Jonas (penalty missed); Samaris (penalty scored); Félix (penalty missed)		(penalty scored) Fagioli; (penalty scored) Can; (penalty scored) Beltrame; (penalty scored) Alex Sandro

1 August 2018 International Champions Cup / Eusébio Cup	Benfica	2–3	Lyon	Faro and Loulé, Portugal
21:05 WEST	Pizzi 59'; Marcelo 64' (o.g.)		Memphis (yellow card) 24'; Marcelo 41'; Traoré 45'; Terrier 83'	Stadium: Estádio Algarve; Attendance: 17,510; Referee: Hélder Malheiro (Portugal)

== Competitions ==
=== Overall record ===
Competition	First match	Last match	Starting round	Final position	Record							
Competition	First match	Last match	Starting round	Final position	Pld	W	D	L	GF	GA	GD	Win %
Primeira Liga	10 August 2018	18 May 2019	Matchday 1	1st	34	28	3	3	103	31	+72	82.35
Taça de Portugal	18 October 2018	3 April 2019	3rd round	Semi-finals	6	5	0	1	9	3	+6	83.33
Taça da Liga	15 September 2018	22 January 2019	Group stage	Semi-finals	4	2	1	1	6	5	+1	50.00
UEFA Champions League	7 August 2018	12 December 2018	Third qualifying round	Group stage (3rd)	10	4	3	3	13	14	−1	40.00
UEFA Europa League	14 February 2019	18 April 2019	Round of 32	Quarter-finals	6	3	1	2	9	6	+3	50.00
Total					60	42	8	10	140	59	+81	70.00

=== Primeira Liga ===
==== League table ====
Pos	Team	Pld	W	D	L	GF	GA	GD	Pts	Qualification or relegation
1	Benfica (C)	34	28	3	3	103	31	+72	87	Qualification for the Champions League group stage
2	Porto	34	27	4	3	74	20	+54	85	Qualification for the Champions League third qualifying round
3	Sporting CP	34	23	5	6	72	33	+39	74	Qualification for the Europa League group stage (Note: Since the winners of the 2018–19 Taça de Portugal, Sporting CP, qualified for European competition based on league position, the spot awarded to the third-placed team (Europa League third qualifying round) was passed to the fourth-placed team, and the spot awarded to the fourth-placed team (Europa League second qualifying round) was passed to the fifth-placed team.)
4	Braga	34	21	4	9	56	37	+19	67	Qualification for the Europa League third qualifying round
5	Vitória de Guimarães	34	15	7	12	46	34	+12	52 (Note: Vitória de Guimarães finished ahead of Moreirense on head-to-head points: Vitória de Guimarães 1–0 Moreirense, Moreirense 1–3 Vitória de Guimarães.)	Qualification for the Europa League second qualifying round

Source: Liga Portugal
Rules for classification: 1) Points; 2) Head-to-head points; 3) Head-to-head goal difference; 4) Head-to-head away goals scored; 5) Goal difference; 6) Matches won; 7) Goals scored; 8) Play-off.
(C) Champions

==== Results by round ====
Round	1	2	3	4	5	6	7	8	9	10	11	12	13	14	15	16	17	18	19	20	21	22	23	24	25	26	27	28	29	30	31	32	33	34
Ground	H	A	H	A	H	A	H	A	H	A	H	A	A	H	A	H	A	A	H	A	H	A	H	A	H	A	H	A	H	H	A	H	A	H
Result	W	W	D	W	W	D	W	L	L	W	W	W	W	W	L	W	W	W	W	W	W	W	W	W	D	W	W	W	W	W	W	W	W	W
Position	7	2	2	1	1	3	1	3	5	4	4	4	4	2	4	3	2	2	2	2	2	2	2	1	1	1	1	1	1	1	1	1	1	1

A = Away; H = Home; W = Win; D = Draw; L = Loss

==== Matches ====
10 August 2018 1	Benfica	3–2	Vitória de Guimarães	Lisbon
20:30 WEST (UTC+01:00)	Pizzi 9', 30', 38'	Report	Boyd (yellow card) 58'; Rafa (yellow card) 67'; André 75'; Celis 81' (yellow card) 86'; Wakaso (yellow card) 90+3'	Stadium: Estádio da Luz; Attendance: 55,219; Referee: João Pinheiro (Braga)

19 August 2018 2	Boavista	0–2	Benfica	Porto
19:00 WEST (UTC+01:00)	Espinho (yellow card) 39'; Mateus (yellow card) 58'; Talocha (yellow card) 71'; Costa (yellow card) 80'	Report	Ferreyra 34'; Fernandes (yellow card) 52'; Pizzi 61'	Stadium: Estádio do Bessa; Attendance: 15,189; Referee: Manuel Mota (Braga)

26 August 2018 3	Benfica	1–1	Sporting CP	Lisbon
19:00 WEST (UTC+01:00)	Ferreyra (yellow card) 44'; Dias (yellow card) 62'; Živković (yellow card) 82'; Félix 86'; Grimaldo (yellow card) 90+1'	Report	Ristovski (yellow card) 24'; Nani 64' (pen.); Petrović (yellow card) 86'; Salin (yellow card) 90+4'; Battaglia (yellow card) 90+7'; Coates (yellow card) 90+7'	Stadium: Estádio da Luz; Attendance: 60,486; Referee: Luís Godinho (Évora)

2 September 2018 4	Nacional	0–4	Benfica	Funchal
18:30 WEST (UTC+01:00)	Marakis (yellow card) 34'	Report	Seferovic 28'; Salvio 45'; Semedo (yellow card) 49'; Jardel (yellow card) 51'; Cervi (yellow card) 67'; Grimaldo 76'; Silva 90+3'	Stadium: Estádio da Madeira; Attendance: 4,793; Referee: Fábio Veríssimo (Leiria)

23 September 2018 5	Benfica	2–0	Desportivo das Aves	Lisbon
18:30 WEST (UTC+01:00)	Félix 34'; Cervi 61'; Dias (yellow card) 85'	Report	Costa (yellow card) 54'; El Adoua (yellow card) 60'; Derley (yellow card) 77'; Falcão (yellow card) 89'	Stadium: Estádio da Luz; Attendance: 53,606; Referee: Rui Costa (Porto)

27 September 2018 6	Chaves	2–2	Benfica	Chaves
21:15 WEST (UTC+01:00)	Perdigão (yellow card) 21'; Marcão (yellow card) 30'; Ghazaryan 75', 90+4'; Djavan (yellow card) 82'	Report	Silva 3', 84'; Gabriel (yellow card) 51'; Conti (red card) 87'	Stadium: Estádio Municipal Eng. Manuel Branco Teixeira; Attendance: 7,783; Referee: João Capela (Lisbon)

7 October 2018 7	Benfica	1–0	Porto	Lisbon
17:30 WEST (UTC+01:00)	Grimaldo (yellow card) 9'; Lema (yellow card) 32' (yellow-red card) 83'; Seferovic 62'; Silva (yellow card) 76'	Report	Casillas (yellow card) 20'; Otávio (yellow card) 47'; Pereira (yellow card) 56'; Herrera (yellow card) 59'; Brahimi (yellow card) 77'	Stadium: Estádio da Luz; Attendance: 61,567; Referee: Fábio Veríssimo (Leiria)

27 October 2018 8	Belenenses SAD	2–0	Benfica	Oeiras
20:30 WEST (UTC+01:00)	Reinildo (yellow card) 31'; Keita (yellow card) 32' (goal) 42'; Eduardo 36'	Report	Jardel (yellow card) 45'; Fejsa (yellow card) 78'	Stadium: Estádio Nacional; Attendance: 10,635; Referee: Artur Soares Dias (Porto)

2 November 2018 9	Benfica	1–3	Moreirense	Lisbon
20:30 WET (UTC±00:00)	Jonas 2' (yellow card) 55'; Dias (yellow card) 73'; Jardel (red card) 76'	Report	Chiquinho 4'; Pedro Nuno 16'; Loum 36' (yellow card) 75'; Ivanildo (yellow card) 74'; Lima (yellow card) 85'	Stadium: Estádio da Luz; Attendance: 47,216; Referee: Nuno Almeida (Algarve)

11 November 2018 10	Tondela	1–3	Benfica	Tondela
17:30 WET (UTC±00:00)	Conti 1' (o.g.); Xavier (yellow card) 23'; Tomané (yellow card) 38'; Bruno (yellow card) 51' (yellow-red card) 54'; Ícaro (red card) 84'	Report	Jonas 9'; Silva (yellow card) 17' (goal) 75'; Cervi (yellow card) 22'; Fejsa (yellow card) 62'; Seferovic 64'	Stadium: Estádio João Cardoso; Attendance: 4,755; Referee: João Pinheiro (Braga)

1 December 2018 11	Benfica	4–0	Feirense	Lisbon
18:00 WET (UTC±00:00)	Silva (yellow card) 3' (goal) 67'; Jonas 48' (yellow card) 48'; Nascimento 57' (o.g.); Seferovic 88'	Report	Alphonse (yellow card) 30'; Silva (yellow card) 34'	Stadium: Estádio da Luz; Attendance: 44,547; Referee: Rui Costa (Porto)

9 December 2018 12	Vitória de Setúbal	0–1	Benfica	Setúbal
20:30 WET (UTC±00:00)	Cristiano (yellow card) 11'; Mano (yellow card) 44'; Pinto (yellow card) 73'	Report	Pizzi (yellow card) 16'; Jonas 17' (yellow card) 44'; Almeida (yellow card) 41'; Fernandes (yellow card) 82'	Stadium: Estádio do Bonfim; Attendance: 9,300; Referee: Carlos Xistra (Castelo Branco)

16 December 2018 13	Marítimo	0–1	Benfica	Funchal
17:30 WET (UTC±00:00)	Correa (yellow card) 25'; Abedzadeh (yellow card) 45+1'; Zainadine (yellow card) 57'; Baiano (yellow card) 65'; Danny (yellow card) 67'	Report	Jonas 45+2' (pen.); Jardel (yellow card) 70'; Cervi (yellow card) 86'; Almeida (yellow card) 90+3'	Stadium: Estádio dos Barreiros; Attendance: 9,830; Referee: João Pinheiro (Braga)

23 December 2018 14	Benfica	6–2	Braga	Lisbon
17:30 WET (UTC±00:00)	Pizzi 19'; Jardel 40'; Grimaldo 48'; Jonas 54'; Dias (yellow card) 57'; Cervi 63'; Almeida 67'	Report	Esgaio (yellow card) 15'; Sousa 51'; Goiano (yellow card) 52'; Novais 74'; Fransérgio (yellow card) 82'	Stadium: Estádio da Luz; Attendance: 57,842; Referee: Artur Soares Dias (Porto)

2 January 2019 15	Portimonense	2–0	Benfica	Portimão
20:15 WET (UTC±00:00)	Dias 12' (o.g.); Jardel 38' (o.g.); Paulinho (yellow card) 63'; Martínez (yellow card) 79'	Report	Cervi (yellow card) 22'; Jonas (yellow card) 63' (red card) 71'	Stadium: Estádio Municipal de Portimão; Attendance: 5,884; Referee: Manuel Mota (Braga)

6 January 2019 16	Benfica	4–2	Rio Ave	Lisbon
17:30 WET (UTC±00:00)	Seferovic 26' 70'; Félix (yellow card) 30' (goal) 31' 63'; Almeida (yellow card) 46'; Fejsa (yellow card) 88'	Report	Gabrielzinho 16'; Moreira 19' (yellow card) 36'; Nadjack (yellow card) 30'; Matheus Reis (yellow card) 57'	Stadium: Estádio da Luz; Attendance: 49,281; Referee: Luís Godinho (Évora)

12 January 2019 17	Santa Clara	0–2	Benfica	Ponta Delgada
18:00 WET (UTC-01:00)	Patrick (yellow card) 8'; Carvalho (yellow card) 20'; Cardoso (red card) 40'; Candé (yellow card) 79'	Report	Seferovic 22'; Dias (yellow card) 25'; Fejsa (yellow card) 35'; Jardel 48' (yellow card) 61'	Stadium: Estádio de São Miguel; Attendance: 10,000; Referee: João Capela (Lisbon)

18 January 2019 18	Vitória de Guimarães	0–1	Benfica	Guimarães
21:15 WET (UTC±00:00)	Sacko (yellow card) 70'; Rafa (yellow card) 77'; André (yellow card) 84'; Wakaso (yellow card) 90+5'	Report	Conti (yellow card) 50'; Seferovic 81'; Almeida (yellow card) 84'	Stadium: Estádio D. Afonso Henriques; Attendance: 22,841; Referee: Tiago Martins (Lisbon)

29 January 2019 19	Benfica	5–1	Boavista	Lisbon
19:00 WET (UTC±00:00)	Félix 9'; Pizzi 28'; Seferovic 54' 73'; Grimaldo 87'	Report	Talocha 42'; Neris (yellow card) 83'	Stadium: Estádio da Luz; Attendance: 41,352; Referee: Rui Costa (Porto)

3 February 2019 20	Sporting CP	2–4	Benfica	Lisbon
17:30 WET (UTC±00:00)	Jefferson (yellow card) 23'; Fernandes (yellow card) 28' (goal) 43'; Gudelj (yellow card) 60'; Ribeiro (yellow card) 72'; Raphinha (yellow card) 83'; Dost 89' (pen.)	Report	Seferovic 11'; Pizzi (yellow card) 28' (goal) 73' (pen.); Félix 36'; Dias 46'; Gabriel (yellow card) 61'; Vlachodimos (red card) 85'	Stadium: Estádio José Alvalade; Attendance: 45,503; Referee: Artur Soares Dias (Porto)

10 February 2019 21	Benfica	10–0	Nacional	Lisbon
17:30 WET (UTC±00:00)	Grimaldo 1'; Samaris (yellow card) 19'; Seferovic 21' 27'; Félix 50'; Pizzi 54' (pen.); Ferro 55'; Dias 64'; Jonas 84' 90'; Silva 87'	Report		Stadium: Estádio da Luz; Attendance: 54,810; Referee: Nuno Almeida (Algarve)

18 February 2019 22	Desportivo das Aves	0–3	Benfica	Vila das Aves
20:15 WET (UTC±00:00)	Diego Galo (yellow card) 71'	Report	Seferovic 2'; Silva 36'; Dias (yellow card) 56'; Ferro 59' (red card) 64'; Samaris (yellow card) 71'; Almeida (yellow card) 89'	Stadium: Estádio do CD Aves; Attendance: 5,159; Referee: Hugo Miguel (Lisbon)

25 February 2019 23	Benfica	4–0	Chaves	Lisbon
21:15 WET (UTC±00:00)	Silva 19' (yellow card) 65'; Félix 37'; Seferovic 44'; Jonas (yellow card) 75' (goal) 89'; Gabriel (yellow card) 87'	Report	Maraš (yellow card) 59'; Melo (yellow card) 75'; Campi (yellow card) 90+3'	Stadium: Estádio da Luz; Attendance: 46,897; Referee: Manuel Mota (Braga)

2 March 2019 24	Porto	1–2	Benfica	Porto
20:30 WET (UTC±00:00)	Adrián 19'; Otávio (yellow card) 77'; Felipe (yellow card) 80'	Report	Dias (yellow card) 17'; Félix 26'; Silva 52'; Ferro (yellow card) 54'; Samaris (yellow card) 60'; Gabriel (yellow card) 77' (yellow-red card) 77'; Vlachodimos (yellow card) 89'	Stadium: Estádio do Dragão; Attendance: 49,220; Referee: Jorge Sousa (Porto)

11 March 2019 25	Benfica	2–2	Belenenses SAD	Lisbon
20:15 WET (UTC±00:00)	Jonas 55'; Samaris 63'	Report	Santos (yellow card) 25'; Eduardo (yellow card) 51' (yellow-red card) 90+4'; Viana 68' (yellow card) 82'; Kikas 70'; Coelho (yellow card) 72'	Stadium: Estádio da Luz; Attendance: 52,158; Referee: João Capela (Lisbon)

17 March 2019 26	Moreirense	0–4	Benfica	Moreira de Cónegos
17:30 WET (UTC±00:00)	Aurélio (yellow card) 6'; Pacheco (yellow card) 36'; Ivanildo (yellow card) 63'; Bilel (yellow card) 90'	Report	Félix 37'; Samaris 43'; Silva 48'; Florentino 83'	Stadium: Parque de Jogos Comendador Joaquim de Almeida Freitas; Attendance: 5,510; Referee: Nuno Almeida (Algarve)

30 March 2019 27	Benfica	1–0	Tondela	Lisbon
20:30 WEST (UTC+01:00)	Seferovic 84'; Taarabt (yellow card) 90+2'	Report	Tomané (yellow card) 36'; Monteiro (yellow card) 81'; Bruno (yellow card) 90'; Costa (yellow card) 90+2'	Stadium: Estádio da Luz; Attendance: 56,594; Referee: Carlos Xistra (Castelo Branco)

7 April 2019 28	Feirense	1–4	Benfica	Santa Maria da Feira
17:30 WEST (UTC+01:00)	Sturgeon 10'; Babanco (yellow card) 58'; Silva (yellow card) 64'	Report	Pizzi 40' (pen.); Almeida 45+2'; Seferovic 49', 89'	Stadium: Estádio Marcolino de Castro; Attendance: 5,449; Referee: João Pinheiro (Braga)

14 April 2019 29	Benfica	4–2	Vitória de Setúbal	Lisbon
20:00 WEST (UTC+01:00)	Silva 1', 36' (yellow card) 59'; Félix 56'; Almeida (yellow card) 67'; Seferovic 78'; Dias (yellow card) 85'	Report	Micael (yellow card) 28'; Valente 39'; Sousa (yellow card) 54'; Fernandes (yellow card) 81'; Cádiz 87' (pen.); Sávio (yellow card) 90+1'	Stadium: Estádio da Luz; Attendance: 56,463; Referee: Rui Costa (Porto)

22 April 2019 30	Benfica	6–0	Marítimo	Lisbon
20:15 WEST (UTC+01:00)	Félix 2', 64'; Pizzi 49'; Cervi 71', 87'; Salvio 90'	Report	Renê (yellow card) 39'; Chico Banza (yellow card) 80'; Baiano (yellow card) 83'	Stadium: Estádio da Luz; Attendance: 52,224; Referee: Luís Godinho (Évora)

28 April 2019 31	Braga	1–4	Benfica	Braga
17:30 WEST (UTC+01:00)	Eduardo 35' (pen.); Palhinha (yellow card) 45+2'; Fransérgio (yellow card) 48'; Esgaio (yellow card) 57'; Viana (yellow card) 64'	Report	Dias (yellow card) 34' (goal) 69'; Pizzi (yellow card) 34' (goal) 59' (pen.), 66' (pen.); Florentino (yellow card) 45+1'; Félix (yellow card) 60'; Silva (yellow card) 72' (goal) 90'; Seferovic (yellow card) 77'	Stadium: Estádio Municipal de Braga; Attendance: 24,046; Referee: Tiago Martins (Lisbon)

4 May 2019 32	Benfica	5–1	Portimonense	Lisbon
18:00 WEST (UTC+01:00)	Silva 62', 65'; Seferovic 84', 88'; Jonas 90+2'	Report	Bruno Tabata 53'	Stadium: Estádio da Luz; Attendance: 60,677; Referee: Artur Soares Dias (Porto)

12 May 2019 33	Rio Ave	2–3	Benfica	Vila do Conde
20:00 WEST (UTC+01:00)	Junio (yellow card) 41'; Coentrão (yellow card) 45+3'; Tarantini (yellow card) 45+3' (goal) 50'; Ronan 84'	Report	Silva 3'; Dias (yellow card) 45'; Félix 45+1'; Pizzi 56' (yellow card) 78'; Grimaldo (yellow card) 86'; Vlachodimos (yellow card) 90+2'	Stadium: Estádio dos Arcos; Attendance: 8,836; Referee: Hugo Miguel (Lisbon)

18 May 2019 34	Benfica	4–1	Santa Clara	Lisbon
18:30 WEST (UTC+01:00)	Seferovic 17', 56'; Félix 23'; Silva 39'	Report	César 59'; Ramos (yellow card) 71'	Stadium: Estádio da Luz; Attendance: 64,064; Referee: Jorge Sousa (Porto)

=== Taça de Portugal ===
18 October 2018 Third round	Sertanense	0–3	Benfica	Coimbra
20:45 WEST (UTC+01:00)	Barbosa (yellow card) 45+2'; Pereira (yellow card) 55'		Silva 35'; Dias (yellow card) 47'; Fernandes 53'; Jonas 68'	Stadium: Estádio Cidade de Coimbra; Attendance: 9,132; Referee: Manuel Oliveira (Porto)

22 November 2018 Fourth round	Benfica	2–1	Arouca	Lisbon
20:45 WET (UTC±00:00)	Jonas 42'; Semedo (yellow card) 50'; Gabriel (yellow card) 62'; Corchia (yellow card) 89'; Silva 90+3'	Report	Bukia 19'; Vieira (yellow card) 40'; Ericson (yellow card) 78'; Kiko (yellow card) 88'; Soares (red card) 90+5'	Stadium: Estádio da Luz; Attendance: 16,454; Referee: Hélder Malheiro (Lisbon)

19 December 2018 Fifth round	Montalegre	0–1	Benfica	Montalegre
20:45 WET (UTC±00:00)		Report	Conti 30' (yellow card) 33'; Gabriel (yellow card) 62'	Stadium: Estádio Dr. Diogo Vaz Pereira; Attendance: 5,470; Referee: Manuel Oliveira (Porto)

15 January 2019 Quarter-finals	Vitória de Guimarães	0–1	Benfica	Guimarães
20:45 WET (UTC±00:00)	Osorio (yellow card) 34'; Amoah (yellow card) 70'; Wakaso (yellow card) 88'	Report	Félix 14'; Jardel (yellow card) 24'; Pizzi (yellow card) 35'; Almeida (yellow card) 83'; Samaris (yellow card) 85'; Svilar (yellow card) 87'	Stadium: Estádio D. Afonso Henriques; Attendance: 13,743; Referee: Hugo Miguel (Lisbon)

6 February 2019 Semi-finals first leg	Benfica	2–1	Sporting CP	Lisbon
20:45 WET (UTC±00:00)	Gabriel 16' (yellow card) 62'; Jardel (yellow card) 28'; Félix (yellow card) 49'; Ilori 64' (o.g.); Silva (yellow card) 71'	Report	Ilori (yellow card) 2'; Gaspar (yellow card) 58'; Fernandes 82'; Diaby (yellow card) 90+1'; Coates (yellow card) 90+4'	Stadium: Estádio da Luz; Attendance: 55,636; Referee: Luís Godinho (Évora)

3 April 2019 Semi-finals second leg	Sporting CP	1–0	Benfica	Lisbon
20:45 WEST (UTC+01:00)	Gudelj (yellow card) 45'; Gaspar (yellow card) 54'; Luiz Phellype (yellow card) 59'; Fernandes 75'; Acuña (yellow card) 77'; Raphinha (yellow card) 82'; Borja (yellow card) 90+5'	Report	Félix (yellow card) 43'; Silva (yellow card) 63' (yellow-red card) 90+5'	Stadium: Estádio José Alvalade; Attendance: 34,221; Referee: Hugo Miguel (Lisbon)

Benfica were eliminated on away goals.

=== Taça da Liga ===
==== Third round ====
Pos	Team	Pld	W	D	L	GF	GA	GD	Pts	Qualification
1	Benfica	3	2	1	0	5	2	+3	7	Advance to knockout phase
2	Desportivo das Aves	3	1	2	0	4	1	+3	5	
3	Paços de Ferreira	3	0	2	1	3	1	+2	2	
4	Rio Ave	3	0	1	2	2	6	−4	1	

Source: Liga Portugal
Rules for classification: Tiebreakers

15 September 2018 1	Benfica	2–1	Rio Ave	Lisbon
18:00 WEST (UTC+01:00)	Semedo (yellow card) 16'; Salvio 21' (yellow card) 35'; Silva 50'; Samaris (yellow card) 79'	Report	Galeno (yellow card) 37'; Gabrielzinho (yellow card) 51'; Vinícius 60'	Stadium: Estádio da Luz; Attendance: 30,132; Referee: Rui Oliveira (Porto)

5 December 2018 2	Benfica	2–0	Paços de Ferreira	Lisbon
20:15 WET (UTC±00:00)	Seferovic 11'; Félix 45'; Semedo (yellow card) 60'	Report	Tanque (yellow card) 38'	Stadium: Estádio da Luz; Attendance: 17,194; Referee: António Nobre (Leiria)

28 December 2018 3	Desportivo das Aves	1–1	Benfica	Vila das Aves
21:15 WET (UTC±00:00)	Gomes (yellow card) 29'; Falcão (yellow card) 44'; Baldé 49'; Jorge Fellipe (yellow card) 58'; Fariña (yellow card) 87'	Report	Fernandes (yellow card) 37'; Seferovic 69'; Ribeiro (yellow card) 75'; Živković (yellow card) 81'	Stadium: Estádio do CD Aves; Attendance: 4,957; Referee: Fábio Veríssimo (Leiria)

==== Semi-finals ====
22 January 2019	Benfica	1–3	Porto	Braga
19:45 WET (UTC±00:00)	Silva 31'; Seferovic (yellow card) 45'; Jardel (yellow card) 55'; Fernandes (yellow card) 64'	Report	Telles (yellow card) 13'; Brahimi 24'; Marega 35'; Pereira (yellow card) 57'; Felipe (yellow card) 71'; Fernando 86'; Tiquinho (yellow card) 90+2'	Stadium: Estádio Municipal de Braga; Attendance: 22,945; Referee: Carlos Xistra (Castelo Branco)

=== UEFA Champions League ===
==== Third qualifying round ====
7 August 2018 First leg	Benfica (Portugal)	1–0	(Turkey) Fenerbahçe	Lisbon, Portugal
21:00 CEST (UTC+02:00)	Cervi 69'; Grimaldo (yellow card) 79'	Report	Soldado (yellow card) 78'; Ekici (yellow card) 82'; Elmas (yellow card) 90+1'	Stadium: Estádio da Luz; Attendance: 57,878; Referee: Aleksei Kulbakov (Belarus)

14 August 2018 Second leg	Fenerbahçe (Turkey)	1–1	(Portugal) Benfica	Istanbul, Turkey
21:00 CEST (UTC+02:00)	Elmas (yellow card) 22'; Potuk 45+1'; Özbayraklı (yellow card) 90'	Report	Fernandes 26'; Vlachodimos (yellow card) 53'; Salvio (yellow card) 56'; Dias (yellow card) 63'; Pizzi (yellow card) 83'	Stadium: Şükrü Saracoğlu Stadium; Attendance: 42,245; Referee: Slavko Vinčić (Slovenia)

Benfica won 2–1 on aggregate.

==== Play-off round ====
21 August 2018 First leg	Benfica (Portugal)	1–1	(Greece) PAOK	Lisbon, Portugal
21:00 CEST (UTC+02:00)	Pizzi 45+1' (pen.); Fernandes (yellow card) 52'; Almeida (yellow card) 83'	Report	Vieirinha (yellow card) 71'; Warda 76' (yellow card) 89'; Pelkas (yellow card) 84'	Stadium: Estádio da Luz; Attendance: 44,084; Referee: Milorad Mažić (Serbia)

29 August 2018 Second leg	PAOK (Greece)	1–4	(Portugal) Benfica	Thessaloniki, Greece
21:00 CEST (UTC+02:00)	Matos (yellow card) 8' (yellow-red card) 76'; Prijović 13'; Maurício (yellow card) 33'; Varela (yellow card) 49'; Pelkas (yellow card) 75'; Shakhov (yellow card) 84'	Report	Almeida (yellow card) 1'; Jardel 20' (yellow card) 34'; Salvio 26' (pen.), 50' (pen.); Pizzi 39'	Stadium: Toumba Stadium; Attendance: 26,725; Referee: Felix Brych (Germany)

Benfica won 5–2 on aggregate.

==== Group stage ====
Pos	Team	Pld	W	D	L	GF	GA	GD	Pts	Qualification	BAY	AJX	BEN	AEK
1	(Germany) Bayern Munich	6	4	2	0	15	5	+10	14	Advance to knockout phase	—	1–1	5–1	2–0
2	(Netherlands) Ajax	6	3	3	0	11	5	+6	12	Advance to knockout phase	3–3	—	1–0	3–0
3	(Portugal) Benfica	6	2	1	3	6	11	−5	7	Transfer to Europa League	0–2	1–1	—	1–0
4	(Greece) AEK Athens	6	0	0	6	2	13	−11	0		0–2	0–2	2–3	—

Source: UEFA
Rules for classification: Group stage tiebreakers

19 September 2018 1	Benfica (Portugal)	0–2	(Germany) Bayern Munich	Lisbon, Portugal
21:00 CEST (UTC+02:00)	Fejsa (yellow card) 22'; Jardel (yellow card) 39'	Report	Lewandowski 10'; Kimmich (yellow card) 18'; Hummels (yellow card) 52'; Sanches 54'	Stadium: Estádio da Luz; Attendance: 60,274; Referee: Antonio Mateu Lahoz (Spain)

2 October 2018 2	AEK Athens (Greece)	2–3	(Portugal) Benfica	Athens, Greece
21:00 CEST (UTC+02:00)	Ponce (yellow card) 34'; Bakasetas (yellow card) 40'; Klonaridis 53', 63'	Report	Seferovic 6'; Dias (yellow card) 8' (yellow-red card) 45+4'; Grimaldo 15' (yellow card) 90+3'; Semedo 74'; Almeida (yellow card) 79'	Stadium: Olympic Stadium; Attendance: 31,154; Referee: Orel Grinfeld (Israel)

23 October 2018 3	Ajax (Netherlands)	1–0	(Portugal) Benfica	Amsterdam, Netherlands
21:00 CEST (UTC+02:00)	Mazraoui (yellow card) 22' (goal) 90+2'; Onana (yellow card) 39'; Tagliafico (yellow card) 49'	Report	Jardel (yellow card) 9'; Conti (yellow card) 64'; Salvio (yellow card) 72'; Seferovic (yellow card) 86'	Stadium: Johan Cruyff Arena; Attendance: 52,489; Referee: Ruddy Buquet (France)

7 November 2018 4	Benfica (Portugal)	1–1	(Netherlands) Ajax	Lisbon, Portugal
21:00 CET (UTC+01:00)	Jonas 29' (yellow card) 39'; Fejsa (yellow card) 45'; Jardel (yellow card) 70'	Report	Tagliafico (yellow card) 34'; De Ligt (yellow card) 42'; Tadić 61' (yellow card) 83'; Van de Beek (yellow card) 72'	Stadium: Estádio da Luz; Attendance: 51,328; Referee: Gianluca Rocchi (Italy)

27 November 2018 5	Bayern Munich (Germany)	5–1	(Portugal) Benfica	Munich, Germany
21:00 CET (UTC+01:00)	Robben 13', 30' (yellow card) 24'; Lewandowski 36', 51'; Ribéry (yellow card) 33' (goal) 76'	Report	Fernandes 46'; Semedo (yellow card) 87'	Stadium: Allianz Arena; Attendance: 70,000; Referee: Daniele Orsato (Italy)

12 December 2018 6	Benfica (Portugal)	1–0	(Greece) AEK Athens	Lisbon, Portugal
21:00 CET (UTC+01:00)	Dias (yellow card) 37'; Grimaldo 88'	Report	Hult (yellow card) 73'; Galanopoulos (yellow card) 82' (yellow-red card) 87'	Stadium: Estádio da Luz; Attendance: 33,633; Referee: Bobby Madden (Scotland)

=== UEFA Europa League ===
==== Knockout phase ====
===== Round of 32 =====
14 February 2019 First leg	Galatasaray (Turkey)	1–2	(Portugal) Benfica	Istanbul, Turkey
18:55 CET (UTC+01:00)	Fernando (yellow card) 40'; Ndiaye (yellow card) 50'; Luyindama 54'; Nagatomo (yellow card) 70'	Report	Salvio 27' (pen.); Fernandes (yellow card) 41'; Gabriel (yellow card) 53'; Seferovic 64'; Félix (yellow card) 90+4'	Stadium: Türk Telekom Stadium; Attendance: 42,722; Referee: Jesús Gil Manzano (Spain)

21 February 2019 Second leg	Benfica (Portugal)	0–0	(Turkey) Galatasaray	Lisbon, Portugal
21:00 CET (UTC+01:00)	Jonas (yellow card) 90+3'	Report	Marcão (yellow card) 4'; Badou Ndiaye (yellow card) 90+3'	Stadium: Estádio da Luz; Attendance: 49,545; Referee: Ovidiu Hațegan (Romania)

Benfica won 2–1 on aggregate.

===== Round of 16 =====
7 March 2019 First leg	Dinamo Zagreb (Croatia)	1–0	(Portugal) Benfica	Zagreb, Croatia
18:55 CET (UTC+01:00)	Petković 38' (pen.); Leovac (yellow card) 68'; Stojanović (yellow card) 75'; Šunjić (yellow card) 83'	Report		Stadium: Stadion Maksimir; Attendance: 29,704; Referee: Michael Oliver (England)

14 March 2019 Second leg	Benfica (Portugal)	3–0 (a.e.t.)	(Croatia) Dinamo Zagreb	Lisbon, Portugal
21:00 CET (UTC+01:00)	Jonas (yellow card) 67' (goal) 71'; Félix (yellow card) 74'; Grimaldo (yellow card) 90'; Ferro 94'; Grimaldo 105'; Gabriel (yellow card) 114'	Report	Moro (yellow card) 14'; Petković (yellow card) 45'; Stojanović (yellow card) 104' (yellow-red card) 104'; Théophile-Catherine (yellow card) 110'	Stadium: Estádio da Luz; Attendance: 47,808; Referee: Deniz Aytekin (Germany)

Benfica won 3–1 on aggregate.

===== Quarter-finals =====
11 April 2019 First leg	Benfica (Portugal)	4–2	(Germany) Eintracht Frankfurt	Lisbon, Portugal
21:00 CEST (UTC+02:00)	Félix 21' (pen.), 43', 54'; Dias 50'; Samaris (yellow card) 82'	Report	Jović (yellow card) 4' (goal) 40'; Ndicka (red card) 20'; Rebić (yellow card) 26'; Paciência 72'; Hasebe (yellow card) 82'	Stadium: Estádio da Luz; Attendance: 54,175; Referee: Anthony Taylor (England)

18 April 2019 Second leg	Eintracht Frankfurt (Germany)	2–0	(Portugal) Benfica	Frankfurt, Germany
21:00 CEST (UTC+02:00)	Kostić 37'; Rode 67'; Abraham (yellow card) 74'; Falette (yellow card) 78'; Rebić (yellow card) 83'	Report	Jonas (yellow card) 90+3'	Stadium: Waldstadion; Attendance: 48,000; Referee: Daniele Orsato (Italy)

Benfica were eliminated on away goals.
