= Nikola Jambor =

Croatian professional footballer

Personal information
- Date of birth: 25 September 1995 (age 31)
- Place of birth: Koprivnica, Croatia
- Height: 1.88 m (6 ft 2 in)
- Position: Defensive midfielder

Team information
- Current team: Altai
- Number: 42

Youth career
- 2012–2014: Slaven Belupo

Senior career*
Years	Team	Apps	(Gls)
2014–2016	Slaven Belupo	36	(0)
2014	→ Koprivnica (loan)	0	(0)
2016–2018	Lokeren	9	(0)
2017–2018	→ Osijek (loan)	14	(0)
2018–2021	Rio Ave	38	(0)
2021–2022	Moreirense	5	(0)
2022–2023	Slaven Belupo	23	(1)
2023–2024	Hajer	26	(3)
2024–2025	Selangor	11	(0)
2026–	Altai	27	(3)
- * Club domestic league appearances and goals as of 1 November 2026

Nikola Jambor (born 25 September 1995) is a Croatian professional footballer who plays as a defensive midfielder for Kazakhstan Premier League club Altai.

== Club career ==
On 28 June 2021, he joined Moreirense on a three-year contract.

On 1 July 2023, Jambor joined Saudi Arabian club Hajer.

On 30 September 2024, Jambor joined a Malaysia Super League club, Selangor.

== Career statistics ==
As of 1 November 2026

Appearances and goals by club, season and competition
Club	Season	League			Cup (Note: Includes Croatian Football Cup, Taça de Portugal, King's Cup, Malaysia FA Cup and Kazakhstan Cup.)		League Cup (Note: Includes Taça da Liga and Malaysia Cup.)		Continental		Other		Total	
Club	Season	Division	Apps	Goals	Apps	Goals	Apps	Goals	Apps	Goals	Apps	Goals	Apps	Goals
Slaven Belupo	2014–15	Croatian Football League	10	0	0	0	—						10	0
Slaven Belupo	2015–16	Croatian Football League	26	0	4	0	—						30	0
Slaven Belupo	Total		36	0	4	0	0	0	0	0	0	0	40	0
Lokeren	2016–17	Belgian First Division A	7	0	0	0	—		2 (Note: Appearance(s) in UEFA Europa League)	0	—		9	0
Osijek (loan)	2017–18	Croatian Football League	14	0	3	1	—		1	0	—		18	1
Osijek (loan)	Total		21	0	3	1	0	0	3	0	0	0	27	1
Rio Ave	2018–19	Primeira Liga	24	0	2	0	3	0	1	0	—		30	0
Rio Ave	2019–20	Primeira Liga	8	0	0	0	2	0	—				10	0
Rio Ave	2020–21	Primeira Liga	6	0	1	0	0	0	3	1	—		10	1
Rio Ave	Total		38	0	3	0	5	0	4	1	0	0	50	1
Moreirense	2021–22	Primeira Liga	5	0	3	0	0	0	—				8	0
Slaven Belupo	2022–23	Croatian Football League	23	1	3	0	—						26	1
Hajer	2023–24	Saudi First Division	26	3	1	0	—						27	3
Hajer	Total		54	4	7	0	0	0	0	0	0	0	61	4
Selangor	2024–25	Malaysia Super League	11	0	0	0	2	1	4 (Note: Appearance(s) in AFC Champions League Two)	0	4 (Note: Appearance(s) in MFL Challenge Cup)	0	21	1
Altai	2026	Kazakhstan Premier League	27	3	3	1	—						30	4
Career total			187	7	20	2	7	1	11	1	4	0	229	11
