= Filipe Augusto =

Brazilian footballer (born 1993)

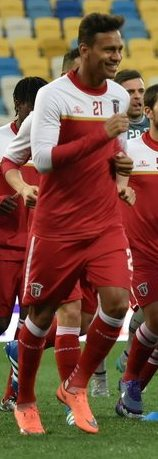
- F. Augusto training with Braga in 2016

Personal information
- Full name: Filipe Augusto Carvalho Souza
- Date of birth: 12 August 1993 (age 33)
- Place of birth: Itambé, Brazil
- Height: 1.83 m (6 ft 0 in)
- Position: Defensive midfielder

Youth career
- 2009–2012: Bahia

Senior career*
| Years | Team | Apps | (Gls) |
| 2012 | Bahia | 4 | (0) |
| 2012–2017 | Rio Ave | 61 | (2) |
| 2014–2015 | → Valencia (loan) | 8 | (0) |
| 2015–2016 | → Braga (loan) | 22 | (2) |
| 2017–2019 | Benfica | 27 | (0) |
| 2018–2019 | → Alanyaspor (loan) | 11 | (0) |
| 2019–2021 | Rio Ave | 78 | (6) |
| 2021–2022 | Damac | 11 | (2) |
| 2023–2024 | Cuiabá | 70 | (0) |
| 2025 | Qingdao Hainiu | 23 | (2) |
| 2026 | Khor Fakkan | 2 | (0) |

International career
| 2012 | Brazil U20 | | |
| 2014 | Brazil U23 | 2 | (0) |
- * Club domestic league appearances and goals as of 28 August 2025

Filipe Augusto Carvalho Souza (born 12 August 1993), known as Filipe Augusto, is a Brazilian professional footballer who plays as a defensive midfielder.

== Club career ==
=== Bahia ===
Born in Itambé, Bahia, Filipe Augusto joined Bahia's youth setup in 2009, aged 16. He was promoted to the first team in 2012 by manager Paulo Roberto Falcão, and renewed his contract with the club in February 2012 until 2014.

Filipe Augusto made his professional debut on 29 February 2012, coming on as a substitute for Magno Cruz in a 5–1 home win against Camaçari in the Campeonato Baiano. He appeared in two further games during the tournament, as the Tricolor were crowned champions.

=== Rio Ave ===
On 18 June 2012, Filipe Augusto signed with Primeira Liga side Rio Ave for five years and a €2.2 million fee. He made his competitive debut on 18 August, starting in a 0–1 home loss against Marítimo. His first match in the UEFA Europa League occurred on 31 July 2014, when he featured 75 minutes in a 1–0 away victory over IFK Göteborg in the third qualifying round.

On 1 September 2014, Filipe Augusto moved to Valencia from Spain in a season-long loan deal, alongside manager Nuno Espírito Santo. His maiden La Liga appearance took place 21 days later, in a 3–0 win at Getafe where he replaced Dani Parejo in the 80th minute. During his spell at the Mestalla Stadium, he was very rarely played.

Filipe Augusto joined Braga in the Portuguese top division for 2015–16, still owned by Rio Ave. In October/November 2015 he scored rare goals (both from penalty kicks) to help oust Segunda Liga teams Académico de Viseu (3–0 away win) and Farense (1–0, also away) from the Taça de Portugal. In late April 2016, however, he suffered a knee injury that sidelined him for the rest of the campaign.

=== Benfica ===
On the last day of the 2017 January transfer window, Filipe Augusto signed a five-and-a-half-year contract with Portuguese champions Benfica. In that season, he played injury time in the final of the domestic cup, won after defeating Vitória de Guimarães 2–1.

On 23 January 2018, Filipe Augusto was loaned to Turkish Süper Lig club Alanyaspor until June of the following year.

=== Later career ===
Filipe Augusto returned to Rio Ave on 30 January 2019 after severing his ties with Benfica, agreeing a deal until June 2021. On 31 August 2021, after his team's top-tier relegation, he joined Damac FC of the Saudi Professional League; only four months later, he was released by the latter.

On 23 February 2023, Filipe Augusto returned to Brazil after nearly eleven years, signing for Cuiabá of the Campeonato Brasileiro Série A. On 5 January 2026, Qingdao Hainiu announced his departure after the contract was expired in 2025 season.

== International career ==
In 2012, Filipe Augusto appeared with the Brazil under-20s in the 2012 Eight Nations Cup. He was also named in a provisional 27-men squad for the 2013 South American Youth Football Championship, but was one of four players cut from the final list.

== Career statistics ==
As of 28 August 2021

Appearances and goals by club, season and competition
| Club | Season | League | | | State League | | Cup | | Continental | | Other | | Total | |
| Club | Season | Division | Apps | Goals | Apps | Goals | Apps | Goals | Apps | Goals | Apps | Goals | Apps | Goals |
|---|---|---|---|---|---|---|---|---|---|---|---|---|---|---|
| Bahia | 2012 | Série A | 0 | 0 | 3 (Note: Appearance(s) in Campeonato Baiano) | 0 | 1 | 0 | 0 | 0 | — | | 4 | 0 |
| Rio Ave | 2012–13 | Primeira Liga | 26 | 0 | — | | 1 | 0 | — | | 1 (Note: Appearance(s) in Taça da Liga) | 0 | 28 | 0 |
| Rio Ave | 2013–14 | Primeira Liga | 9 | 0 | — | | 4 | 0 | — | | 2 | 0 | 15 | 0 |
| Rio Ave | 2014–15 | Primeira Liga | 1 | 0 | — | | 0 | 0 | 4 (Note: Appearance(s) in UEFA Europa League) | 0 | 1 (Note: Appearance(s) in Supertaça Cândido de Oliveira) | 0 | 6 | 0 |
| Rio Ave | 2015–16 | Primeira Liga | 2 | 0 | — | | 0 | 0 | — | | — | | 2 | 0 |
| Rio Ave | 2016–17 | Primeira Liga | 8 | 2 | — | | 0 | 0 | — | | 1 | 0 | 9 | 2 |
| Rio Ave | Total | | 46 | 2 | — | | 5 | 0 | 4 | 0 | 5 | 0 | 60 | 2 |
| Valencia (loan) | 2014–15 | La Liga | 6 | 0 | — | | 2 | 0 | — | | — | | 8 | 0 |
| Braga (loan) | 2015–16 | Primeira Liga | 15 | 0 | — | | 3 | 2 | 3 | 0 | 1 | 0 | 22 | 2 |
| Benfica | 2016–17 | Primeira Liga | 9 | 0 | — | | 3 | 0 | 1 (Note: Appearance(s) in UEFA Champions League) | 0 | — | | 13 | 0 |
| Benfica | 2017–18 | Primeira Liga | 8 | 0 | — | | 0 | 0 | 3 | 0 | 3 (Note: One appearance in Supertaça Cândido de Oliveira, two appearances in Taça da Liga) | 0 | 14 | 0 |
| Benfica | Total | | 17 | 0 | — | | 3 | 0 | 4 | 0 | 3 | 0 | 27 | 0 |
| Alanyaspor (loan) | 2017–18 | Süper Lig | 5 | 0 | — | | 0 | 0 | — | | — | | 5 | 0 |
| Alanyaspor (loan) | 2018–19 | Süper Lig | 5 | 0 | — | | 1 | 0 | — | | — | | 6 | 0 |
| Alanyaspor (loan) | Total | | 10 | 0 | — | | 1 | 0 | — | | — | | 11 | 0 |
| Rio Ave | 2018–19 | Primeira Liga | 12 | 1 | — | | 0 | 0 | — | | — | | 12 | 1 |
| Rio Ave | 2019–20 | Primeira Liga | 28 | 4 | — | | 3 | 0 | — | | 4 | 1 | 35 | 5 |
| Rio Ave | 2020–21 | Primeira Liga | 25 | 0 | — | | 1 | 0 | 3 | 0 | 0 | 0 | 29 | 0 |
| Rio Ave | Total | | 65 | 5 | — | | 4 | 0 | 3 | 0 | 4 | 1 | 76 | 6 |
| Career total | | | 159 | 7 | 3 | 0 | 19 | 2 | 14 | 0 | 13 | 1 | 208 | 10 |

== Honours ==
Bahia

- Campeonato Baiano: 2012

Rio Ave

- Taça de Portugal runner-up: 2013–14
- Taça da Liga runner-up: 2013–14
- Supertaça Cândido de Oliveira runner-up: 2014

Braga

- Taça de Portugal: 2015–16

Benfica

- Primeira Liga: 2016–17
- Taça de Portugal: 2016–17
- Supertaça Cândido de Oliveira: 2017

Cuiabá

- Campeonato Mato-Grossense: 2023, 2024
