= Ronan (footballer, born 1995) =

Brazilian footballer

Personal information
- Full name: Ronan David Jerônimo
- Date of birth: 22 April 1995 (age 31)
- Place of birth: Piraúba, Brazil
- Height: 1.95 m (6 ft 5 in)
- Position: Forward

Team information
- Current team: Jeonnam Dragons
- Number: 19

Youth career
- 2006–2014: Fluminense
- 2012: → Parma (loan)
- 2013–2014: → Grêmio (loan)

Senior career*
| Years | Team | Apps | (Gls) |
| 2014–2015 | Grêmio | 1 | (0) |
| 2015–2016 | Sanjoanense | 16 | (5) |
| 2016–2022 | Rio Ave | 63 | (8) |
| 2017–2018 | → Varzim (loan) | 2 | (0) |
| 2020 | → Tondela (loan) | 12 | (5) |
| 2023 | Seoul E-Land FC | 29 | (7) |
| 2024 | Yanbian Longding | 27 | (12) |
| 2025- | Jeonnam Dragons | 39 | (14) |
- * Club domestic league appearances and goals as of 8 August 2026

Ronan David Jerônimo (born 22 April 1995), or simply Ronan, is a Brazilian professional footballer who plays as a forward for K League 2 club Jeonnam Dragons.

== Career ==
Born in Piraúba, in the Minas Gerais state, Ronan was discovered by former professional footballer Filipe Alvim to 11 years old, being taken to the Fluminense's academy, where he remained until 2012. This year, he was loaned to Parma, but trading for its outright purchase failed, and he returned from Italy after six months in the club.

In September 2013, Ronan was again loaned, this time going to the Grêmio until January 2015. He joined the under-19s team of the club's academy. In August 2014, Ronan made his debut for the first team squad of Grêmio, entering in the final minutes of 2–0 home won against Criciúma in the Campeonato Brasileiro Série A.

On 14 January 2023, Ronan joined Seoul E-Land FC of South Korean K League 2.

On 1 February 2024, China League One club Yanbian Longding announced the signing of Ronan.

== Career statistics ==
As of match played 8 August 2026.

Appearances and goals by club, season and competition
| Club | Season | League | | | State League | | National Cup | | League Cup | | Continental | | Other | | Total | |
| Club | Season | Division | Apps | Goals | Apps | Goals | Apps | Goals | Apps | Goals | Apps | Goals | Apps | Goals | Apps | Goals |
|---|---|---|---|---|---|---|---|---|---|---|---|---|---|---|---|---|
| Grêmio | 2014 | Série A | 2 | 0 | 0 | 0 | 0 | 0 | — | | 0 | 0 | — | | 2 | 0 |
| Sanjoanense | 2015–16 | Campeonato de Portugal | 16 | 5 | — | | 3 | 2 | — | | — | | — | | 19 | 7 |
| Rio Ave | 2015–16 | Primeira Liga | 2 | 0 | — | | 0 | 0 | 0 | 0 | — | | — | | 2 | 0 |
| Rio Ave | 2016–17 | Primeira Liga | 11 | 1 | — | | 1 | 0 | 2 | 1 | 0 | 0 | — | | 14 | 2 |
| Rio Ave | 2018–19 | Primeira Liga | 9 | 3 | — | | 0 | 0 | 0 | 0 | 0 | 0 | — | | 9 | 3 |
| Rio Ave | 2019–20 | Primeira Liga | 12 | 1 | — | | 3 | 1 | 4 | 1 | — | | — | | 19 | 3 |
| Rio Ave | 2020–21 | Primeira Liga | 13 | 0 | — | | 0 | 0 | — | | 0 | 0 | 1 | 0 | 14 | 0 |
| Rio Ave | 2021–22 | Liga Portugal 2 | 16 | 3 | — | | 0 | 0 | 1 | 0 | — | | — | | 17 | 3 |
| Rio Ave | Total | | 63 | 8 | — | | 4 | 1 | 7 | 2 | 0 | 0 | 1 | 0 | 75 | 11 |
| Varzim (loan) | 2017–18 | LigaPro | 2 | 0 | — | | 0 | 0 | — | | — | | — | | 2 | 0 |
| Tondela (loan) | 2019–20 | Primeira Liga | 12 | 5 | — | | — | | — | | — | | — | | 12 | 5 |
| Seoul E-Land | 2023 | K League 2 | 29 | 7 | — | | 1 | 0 | — | | — | | — | | 30 | 7 |
| Yanbian Longding | 2024 | China League One | 27 | 12 | — | | 0 | 0 | — | | — | | — | | 27 | 12 |
| Jeonnam Dragons | 2025 | K League 2 | 29 | 12 | — | | 0 | 0 | — | | — | | — | | 29 | 12 |
| Jeonnam Dragons | 2026 | K League 2 | 10 | 2 | — | | 0 | 0 | — | | — | | — | | 10 | 2 |
| Jeonnam Dragons | Total | | 39 | 14 | — | | 0 | 0 | — | | — | | — | | 39 | 14 |
| Career total | | | 190 | 51 | 0 | 0 | 8 | 3 | 7 | 2 | 0 | 0 | 1 | 0 | 206 | 56 |
