= Jonathan Buatu =

Footballer (born 1993)

Personal information
- Full name: Jonathan Buatu Mananga
- Date of birth: 27 September 1993 (age 33)
- Place of birth: Liège, Belgium
- Height: 1.87 m (6 ft 2 in)
- Position: Centre-back

Team information
- Current team: Gil Vicente
- Number: 39

Youth career
- 1999–2001: RFC Liège
- 2001–2002: Saint-Louis Athus
- 2002–2006: Montegnée
- 2006–2008: RFC Liège
- 2008–2010: Standard Liège

Senior career*
Years	Team	Apps	(Gls)
2009–2012	Standard Liège	1	(0)
2012–2013	Genk	0	(0)
2012	→ FC Brussels (loan)	1	(0)
2013–2015	Fulham	0	(0)
2015–2018	Waasland-Beveren	76	(3)
2018–2020	Rio Ave	21	(0)
2019	→ Excel Mouscron (loan)	2	(0)
2020	→ Desportivo Aves (loan)	12	(0)
2020–2022	Sint-Truiden	38	(1)
2022	→ Eyüpspor (loan)	11	(1)
2022–2024	Valenciennes	40	(3)
2024–	Gil Vicente	64	(2)

International career^{‡}
2010	Belgium U17	7	(0)
2010–2011	Belgium U18	10	(1)
2011	Belgium U19	5	(0)
2014–	Angola	57	(2)
- * Club domestic league appearances and goals as of 20 September 2026 ‡ National team caps and goals as of 8 October 2025

Jonathan Buatu Mananga (born 27 September 1993), known simply as Buatu, is a professional footballer who plays as a centre-back for and captains Primeira Liga club Gil Vicente. Born in Belgium, he represents the Angola national team.

== Club career ==
On 25 January 2024, Buatu returned to Portugal and signed a contract until 2026 with Primeira Liga club Gil Vicente.

== International career ==
After representing Belgium at youth level, Buatu was called up to represent Angola at senior level. On 3 August 2014, he made his debut in the 1–0 home friendly win over Ethiopia.

On 3 December 2025, Buatu was called up to the Angola squad for the 2025 Africa Cup of Nations.

=== International goals ===
Scores and results list Angola's goal tally first.

Goal	Date	Venue	Opponent	Score	Result	Competition
1.	8 October 2021	Estádio 11 de Novembro, Luanda, Angola	Gabon	3–1	3–1	2022 FIFA World Cup qualification
2.	8 October 2025	Somhlolo National Stadium, Lobamba, Eswatini	Eswatini	1–2	2–2	2026 FIFA World Cup qualification
