= Tarantini (Portuguese footballer) =

Portuguese footballer

Personal information
- Full name: Ricardo José Vaz Alves Monteiro
- Date of birth: 7 October 1983 (age 43)
- Place of birth: Gestaçô, Portugal
- Height: 1.76 m (5 ft 9 in)
- Position: Central midfielder

Youth career
- 1993–2001: Amarante
- 2001–2002: Covilhã

Senior career*
Years	Team	Apps	(Gls)
2002–2006	Covilhã	103	(15)
2006–2007	Gondomar	18	(4)
2007–2008	Portimonense	30	(5)
2008–2021	Rio Ave	345	(24)
Total		496	(48)

Managerial career
- 2021–2023: Famalicão (assistant)
- 2024–2026: Paredes
- * Club domestic league appearances and goals

Ricardo José Vaz Alves Monteiro (born 7 October 1983), known as Tarantini, is a Portuguese former professional footballer who played as a central midfielder.

He spent most of his career with Rio Ave, making 444 competitive appearances including 345 in the Primeira Liga. Earlier, he played 112 games and scored 21 goals in the Segunda Liga for three other clubs.

== Playing career ==
Born in the village of Gestaçô in Baião, Porto District, Tarantini earned his nickname from his physical resemblance to Argentine footballer Alberto Tarantini. He started playing football with Amarante FC, remaining in the club's youth system for eight years, then made his debut as a senior with S.C. Covilhã in 2002. He alternated between the second and third divisions until 2008, also representing Gondomar S.C. and Portimonense SC.

In summer 2008, Tarantini signed for Rio Ave F.C. of the Primeira Liga, making his debut in the competition on 24 August in a 1–1 home draw against S.L. Benfica (82 minutes played) and finishing his debut season with 20 matches and five starts to help his team to the 12th position.

Tarantini scored his first goal in the top tier of Portuguese football on 10 April 2011, the last in a 6–1 away rout of F.C. Paços de Ferreira. The 2012–13 campaign was the most prolific of his career with six league goals – seven overall – including two in a 2–2 draw at home to reigning champions FC Porto on 29 September.

In 2013–14, Tarantini played 37 total games as the team from Vila do Conde reached the finals of the Taça de Portugal and Taça da Liga, losing both to S.L. Benfica. In the fourth round of the former on 10 November 2013, he opened the scoring in a 4–2 home win over Sertanense F.C. at the Estádio dos Arcos. The following 10 August, in the Supertaça Cândido de Oliveira against the same adversary as the previous finals, he played the full 120 minutes of a goalless draw and took Rio Ave's first attempt in the penalty shootout, saved by Artur Moraes whose team ended victorious.

Tarantini remained a regular in the 2019–20 season, as Rio Ave finished a joint-best fifth and with a record points tally of 55. On 22 February, he made his 400th appearance in a 2–1 victory at C.D. Tondela. In May 2021, after the team's relegation, he went up to the fans in tears and asked for forgiveness; he was met with applause and requests to stay with the club, but was ultimately released by the board of directors in July.

== Coaching career ==
In October 2021, shortly after having announced his retirement, the 38-year-old Tarantini joined Ivo Vieira's coaching staff at F.C. Famalicão. He then was the manager of U.S.C. Paredes, achieving promotion to the Liga 3 in 2024–25 and avoiding relegation the following season.

== Personal life ==
Tarantini held a degree and a master's degree in sports science from the University of Beira Interior, which he obtained still as a professional footballer. In November 2017, he released a book A Minha Causa (My Cause) with advice for his fellow professionals on life after retiring from the game.

== Career statistics ==
Club	Season	League			Taça de Portugal		Taça da Liga		Continental		Other		Total	
Club	Season	Division	Apps	Goals	Apps	Goals	Apps	Goals	Apps	Goals	Apps	Goals	Apps	Goals
Covilhã	2001–02	Segunda Divisão	2	1	0	0	—		—		—		2	1
Covilhã	2002–03	Segunda Liga	5	1	1	0	—		—		—		6	1
Covilhã	2003–04	Segunda Liga	28	6	2	0	—		—		—		30	6
Covilhã	2004–05	Segunda Divisão	36	3	1	1	—		—		—		37	4
Covilhã	2005–06	Liga de Honra	32	4	2	1	—				—		34	5
Covilhã	Total		103	15	6	2	—		—		—		109	17
Gondomar	2006–07	Liga de Honra	18	4	2	0	—		—		—		20	4
Portimonense	2007–08	Liga de Honra	30	5	2	2	5	0	—		—		37	7
Rio Ave	2008–09	Primeira Liga	20	0	1	1	5	2	—		—		26	3
Rio Ave	2009–10	Primeira Liga	22	0	6	1	5	0	—		—		33	1
Rio Ave	2010–11	Primeira Liga	28	2	4	1	2	0	—		—		34	3
Rio Ave	2011–12	Primeira Liga	22	0	1	0	2	0	—		—		25	0
Rio Ave	2012–13	Primeira Liga	29	6	2	0	4	1	—		—		35	7
Rio Ave	2013–14	Primeira Liga	26	2	7	2	4	0	—		—		37	4
Rio Ave	2014–15	Primeira Liga	29	2	5	0	0	0	9 (Note: Appearances in UEFA Europa League)	0	1 (Note: Appearance in Supertaça Cândido de Oliveira)	0	44	2
Rio Ave	2015–16	Primeira Liga	25	2	5	2	3	1	—		—		33	5
Rio Ave	2016–17	Primeira Liga	32	5	1	0	2	0	2 (Note: Appearances in UEFA Europa League qualifiers)	0	—		37	5
Rio Ave	2017–18	Primeira Liga	31	1	4	1	3	0	—		—		38	2
Rio Ave	2018–19	Primeira Liga	24	1	2	0	2	0	2	0	—		30	1
Rio Ave	2019–20	Primeira Liga	31	3	4	1	4	1	—		—		39	5
Rio Ave	2020–21	Primeira Liga	26	0	3	0	0	0	3	1	1 (Note: Appearance in Primeira Liga relegation play-offs)	0	33	1
Rio Ave	Total		345	24	45	9	36	5	16	1	2	0	444	39
Career Total			496	48	55	13	41	5	16	1	2	0	610	67
