= Vitó Ferreira =

Portuguese footballer

Vitó
Personal information
- Full name: Vítor Emanuel Araújo Ferreira
- Date of birth: 18 February 1997 (age 29)
- Place of birth: Barcelos, Portugal
- Height: 1.80 m (5 ft 11 in)
- Position: Midfielder

Team information
- Current team: 1.º Dezembro
- Number: 8

Youth career
- 2005–2007: Gil Vicente
- 2007–2010: Porto
- 2010–2017: Rio Ave

Senior career*
Years	Team	Apps	(Gls)
2015–2020	Rio Ave	5	(0)
2018	→ Covilhã	11	(0)
2020–2023	Casa Pia	55	(3)
2023–2024	Estrela Amadora	23	(1)
2024	Leixões	11	(0)
2024–2025	Gloria Buzău	11	(0)
2025–	1.º Dezembro	22	(0)
- * Club domestic league appearances and goals as of 7 May 2026

Vítor Emanuel Araújo Ferreira (born 18 September 1997), known as Vitó, is a Portuguese professional footballer who plays as a midfielder for Liga 3 club 1.º Dezembro.

== Career ==
On 21 January 2015, Vitó made his professional debut with Rio Ave in a 2014–15 Taça da Liga match against Académica.

On 31 January 2024, Vitó left Primeira Liga club Estrela da Amadora and joined Liga Portugal 2 side Leixões.
