= Murilo (footballer, born 1996) =

Brazilian footballer

Personal information
- Full name: Murilo Oliveira de Freitas
- Date of birth: 12 May 1996 (age 30)
- Place of birth: São José do Rio Preto, Brazil
- Height: 1.76 m (5 ft 9 in)
- Position: Winger

Youth career
- Mirassol

Senior career*
Years	Team	Apps	(Gls)
2016–2019	Mirassol	16	(0)
2016–2018	→ Tondela (loan)	44	(8)
2018–2019	→ Rio Ave (loan)	9	(0)
2019–2020	Rio Ave	0	(0)
2019–2020	→ Paços de Ferreira (loan)	18	(0)
2020–2021	Estoril	19	(0)
2021–2022	Varzim	30	(2)
2022–2023	Mafra	14	(1)
2023	Chapecoense	6	(0)
2023–2024	Chonburi	16	(1)
- * Club domestic league appearances and goals as of 7 July 2024

Murilo Oliveira de Freitas (born 12 May 1996) is a Brazilian footballer who plays as a winger.

== Club career ==
On 7 August 2019, he joined Primeira Liga club Paços de Ferreira for the 2019–20 season.

On 1 July 2021, he signed with Varzim.

On 6 January 2023, Murilo joined Chapecoense on a contract until 30 November 2023.
