= Piraúba =

Brazilian municipality located in the state of Minas Gerais

Coordinates: 21°17′S 43°02′W

- Municipality
- Coat of arms
- Interactive map of Piraúba
- Country: Brazil
- State: Minas Gerais
- Region: Southeast
- Time zone: UTC−3 (BRT)

Location of Piraúba within Minas Gerais

Piraúba is a Brazilian municipality located in the state of Minas Gerais. The city belongs to the mesoregion of Zona da Mata and to the microregion of Ubá. As of 2020, the estimated population was 10,759.

== See also ==
- List of municipalities in Minas Gerais
