= Theo Ryuki =

Japanese-Greek-Brazilian footballer

Personal information
- Full name: Theodoros Ryuki Kamekura Panagopoulos
- Date of birth: 31 July 1995 (age 31)
- Height: 1.79 m (5 ft 10 1/2 in)
- Position: Midfielder

Youth career
- 2012–2013: Porto

Senior career*
Years	Team	Apps	(Gls)
2013–2014	Porto	0	(0)
2013–2014	→ Portimonense (loan)	6	(0)
2014–2019	Portimonense	64	(2)
Total		70	(0)
- * Club domestic league appearances and goals

Theodoros Ryuki Kamekura Panagopoulos (Greek: Θεόδωρος Ριούκι Καμεκούρα Παναγόπουλος), known as Theo Ryuki or Theo Japa (born 31 July 1995) is a Japanese-Greek former professional footballer. He also holds Brazilian citizenship.

== Career ==
He made his professional debut in the Segunda Liga for Portimonense on 11 December 2013 in a game against Chaves.

He left the club after the 2018–19 season and subsequently retired from football, instead pursuing a career as a sports agent. He has since represented players such as Shoya Nakajima. In May 2021, he was mentioned as a suspect surrounding the falsification of a COVID-19 test of Nakajima.
