= Bruno Moreira =

Portuguese footballer (born 1987)

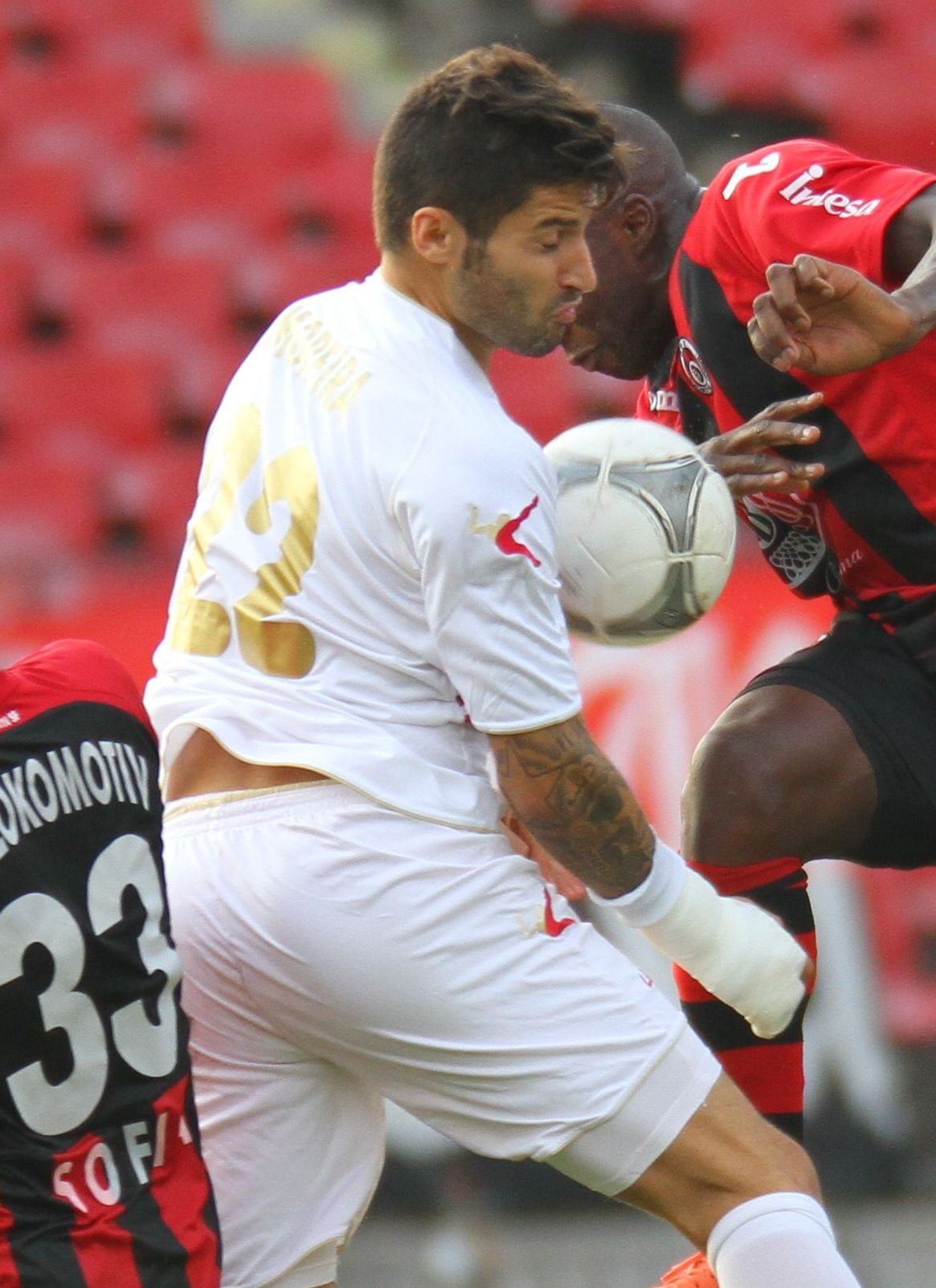
- Moreira playing with CSKA Sofia

Personal information
- Full name: Bruno Daniel Pereira Castro Moreira
- Date of birth: 6 September 1987 (age 39)
- Place of birth: Landim, Portugal
- Height: 1.85 m (6 ft 1 in)
- Position: Forward

Youth career
- 2000–2002: Famalicão
- 2002–2005: Porto
- 2005: Braga

Senior career*
Years	Team	Apps	(Gls)
2005–2006	Braga B	11	(2)
2006–2007	Joane		
2007–2011	Varzim	69	(15)
2011–2012	Moreirense	41	(13)
2012–2014	Nacional	12	(1)
2013	→ CSKA Sofia (loan)	9	(1)
2014	Chaves	8	(0)
2014–2016	Paços Ferreira	57	(24)
2016	Buriram United	13	(5)
2017–2018	Paços Ferreira	32	(4)
2018–2021	Rio Ave	65	(12)
2021	Portimonense	16	(0)
2021–2022	Trofense	15	(1)
2023	São Martinho	4	(0)
Total		352	(78)

International career
2002–2003	Portugal U16	14	(2)
2003–2004	Portugal U17	7	(2)
- * Club domestic league appearances and goals

Bruno Daniel Pereira Castro Moreira (born 6 September 1987) is a Portuguese former professional footballer who played as a forward.

== Club career ==
Born in the village of Landim, Vila Nova de Famalicão, Moreira finished his development at S.C. Braga. He started as a senior with amateurs G.D. Joane, then went on to spend the following five seasons in the Segunda Liga, with Varzim S.C. and Moreirense FC.

In summer 2012, Moreira moved to the Primeira Liga with C.D. Nacional. His first game in the competition took place on 26 August, as he came as a 75th-minute substitute in a 3−1 away loss against his former club Moreirense. His first goal arrived on 17 February of the following year, in a 1–1 draw at F.C. Paços de Ferreira. Whilst under contract with the Madeirans, he was loaned to PFC CSKA Sofia from Bulgaria, being released in January 2014 and signing for G.D. Chaves of the second division.

On 16 June 2014, Moreira moved to Paços Ferreira on a two-year deal. He was always his team's top scorer during his spell, while competing in the top tier.

Moreira moved to Thai Premier League champions Buriram United F.C. on 17 May 2016. Returned to Portugal the following year, he went on to represent Paços and Rio Ave FC, signing for the latter on a free transfer on 19 May 2018 after the former's relegation.

Moreira scored once in European competitions. On 24 September 2020, in the third qualifying round of the UEFA Europa League, he equalised 1–1 away against Beşiktaş J.K. in the 85th minute, then converted his penalty shootout attempt in a 4–2 win for Rio Ave in Turkey.

On 7 January 2021, Moreira joined top-flight Portimonense SC. He returned to the division below in June, on a contract at C.D. Trofense.

Moreira retired on 28 November 2023 aged 36, at the conclusion of a brief stint with AR São Martinho in the Porto regional leagues.

== Career statistics ==
Appearances and goals by club, season and competition
Club	Season	League			National cup (Note: Includes Taça de Portugal, Bulgarian Cup, Thai FA Cup)		League cup (Note: Includes Taça da Liga)		Continental		Total	
Club	Season	Division	Apps	Goals	Apps	Goals	Apps	Goals	Apps	Goals	Apps	Goals
Braga B	2005–06	Segunda Divisão	11	2	—		—		—		11	2
Joane	2006–07	Terceira Divisão	—		—		—		—		—	
Varzim	2007–08	Liga de Honra	12	4	0	0	0	0	—		12	4
Varzim	2008–09	Liga de Honra	20	4	1	0	0	0	—		21	4
Varzim	2009–10	Liga de Honra	28	6	2	1	2	0	—		32	7
Varzim	2010–11	Liga de Honra	9	1	2	0	1	0	—		12	1
Varzim	Total		69	15	5	1	3	0	—		77	16
Moreirense	2010–11	Liga de Honra	14	3	0	0	0	0	—		14	3
Moreirense	2011–12	Liga de Honra	27	10	3	2	5	2	—		35	14
Moreirense	Total		41	13	3	2	5	2	—		49	17
Nacional	2012–13	Primeira Liga	12	1	0	0	1	0	—		13	1
CSKA Sofia (loan)	2013–14	A Group	9	1	2	0	—		—		11	1
Chaves	2013–14	Segunda Liga	8	0	0	0	0	0	—		8	0
Paços Ferreira	2014–15	Primeira Liga	28	10	3	4	0	0	—		31	14
Paços Ferreira	2015–16	Primeira Liga	29	14	2	4	2	0	—		33	18
Paços Ferreira	Total		57	24	5	8	2	0	—		64	32
Buriram United	2016	Thai League 1	13	5	1	0	—		0	0	14	5
Paços Ferreira	2017–18	Primeira Liga	32	4	0	0	4	0	—		36	4
Rio Ave	2018–19	Primeira Liga	30	9	1	1	4	0	2 (Note: Appearances in UEFA Europa League)	0	37	10
Rio Ave	2019–20	Primeira Liga	27	3	3	0	4	1	—		34	4
Rio Ave	2020–21	Primeira Liga	8	0	1	0	—		3	1	12	1
Rio Ave	Total		65	12	5	1	8	1	5	1	83	15
Portimonense	2020–21	Primeira Liga	16	0	0	0	—		—		16	0
Trofense	2021–22	Liga Portugal 2	15	1	2	0	1	0	—		18	1
São Martinho	2023–24	AF Porto – Elite Division	4	0	—		—		—		4	0
Career total			352	78	23	12	24	3	5	1	404	94
