= Damien Furtado =

French footballer (born 1997)

Personal information
- Date of birth: 8 March 1997 (age 29)
- Place of birth: Épinay-sous-Sénart, France
- Height: 1.80 m (5 ft 11 in)
- Position: Winger

Team information
- Current team: St Maur Lusitanos

Youth career
- 2015–2016: Oeiras

Senior career*
Years	Team	Apps	(Gls)
2016	Oeiras	1	(0)
2016–2017	1º Dezembro	3	(0)
2017–2018	São Martinho	25	(12)
2017–2020	Rio Ave	5	(1)
2019	→ Famalicão (loan)	6	(0)
2020	→ Casa Pia (loan)	5	(0)
2017–2021	Rio Ave B	16	(2)
2021–2022	Lusitânia	26	(1)
2022–2023	Sainte-Geneviève	15	(2)
2023–	St Maur Lusitanos	22	(2)
- * Club domestic league appearances and goals as of 7 December 2024

Damien Furtado (born 8 March 1997) is a French footballer who plays for Championnat National 3 club St Maur Lusitanos as a winger.

== Career ==
On 5 August 2018, Furtado made his professional debut with Rio Ave in a 2018–19 Taça da Liga match against Portimonense.

== Personal life ==
Furtado was born in France to a Cape Verdean father and Angolan mother.
