= Wellington (footballer, born 1992) =

Brazilian footballer

Personal information
- Full name: Wellington Nascimento Carvalho
- Date of birth: 21 November 1992 (age 33)
- Place of birth: Caçapava, Brazil
- Height: 1.80 m (5 ft 11 in)
- Position: Winger

Youth career
- 2008: São José
- 2009–2011: Figueirense

Senior career*
Years	Team	Apps	(Gls)
2011	Figueirense		
2012–2015	Boavista	36	(11)
2014–2015	→ Mirandela (loan)	26	(4)
2015–2016	Bragança	28	(8)
2016–2017	Penafiel	37	(7)
2017–2019	Portimonense	50	(7)
2020–2022	Chaves	70	(17)
2022–2023	Al-Arabi	33	(2)
2023–2024	Khaitan		(3)
2024–2026	Chaves	42	(4)
- * Club domestic league appearances and goals as of 20 June 2026

Wellington Nascimento Carvalho (born 21 November 1992), known as Wellington, is a Brazilian professional footballer who plays as a winger.

== Club career ==
He made his professional debut in the Segunda Liga for Penafiel on 6 August 2016 in a game against Sporting Covilhã.

On 19 June 2022, Wellington joined Saudi Arabian club Al-Arabi.

On 2 July 2024, Wellington returned to Chaves.

== Career statistics ==
As of 14 February 2018

Appearances and goals by club, season and competition
Club	Season	League			National cup		League cup		Other		Total	
Club	Season	Division	Apps	Goals	Apps	Goals	Apps	Goals	Apps	Goals	Apps	Goals
Boavista	2012–13	Segunda Divisão	28	10	0	0	0	0	0	0	28	10
Boavista	2013–14	Campeonato Nacional de Seniores	8	1	0	0	0	0	0	0	8	1
Boavista	Total		36	11	0	0	0	0	0	0	36	11
Mirandela (loan)	2013–14	Campeonato Nacional de Seniores	26	4	0	0	0	0	0	0	26	4
Bragança	2015–16	Campeonato de Portugal	28	8	0	0	0	0	0	0	28	8
Penafiel	2016–17	LigaPro	37	7	2	0	2	0	0	0	41	7
Portimonense	2017–18	Primeira Liga	16	0	1	1	4	0	0	0	21	1
Career totals			143	30	3	1	6	0	0	0	152	31
