= Miguel Rodrigues (footballer, born 1993) =

Portuguese footballer

Personal information
- Full name: Miguel Fernando Pereira Rodrigues
- Date of birth: 16 March 1993 (age 33)
- Place of birth: Fátima, Portugal
- Height: 1.89 m (6 ft 2 in)
- Position: Centre-back

Team information
- Current team: Zakynthos
- Number: 30

Youth career
- 2003–2007: Fátima
- 2007–2009: CADE
- 2009–2012: União Leiria

Senior career*
| Years | Team | Apps | (Gls) |
| 2012 | União Leiria | 2 | (0) |
| 2012–2016 | Nacional | 64 | (1) |
| 2016−2018 | Panetolikos | 27 | (1) |
| 2018–2020 | Rio Ave | 2 | (0) |
| 2019 | → Estoril (loan) | 13 | (1) |
| 2021–2022 | União Santarém | 12 | (1) |
| 2022–2023 | Oliveira Hospital | 24 | (4) |
| 2023–2024 | Académica | 12 | (0) |
| 2024 | Bravo | 13 | (0) |
| 2025 | Panargiakos | 11 | (0) |
| 2025 | Mladost Donja Gorica | 12 | (2) |
| 2026 | União Santarém | 3 | (0) |
| 2026– | Zakynthos | 3 | (0) |

International career
| 2012–2013 | Portugal U20 | 8 | (0) |
| 2014 | Portugal U21 | 1 | (0) |
- * Club domestic league appearances and goals as of 19 September 2026

Miguel Fernando Pereira Rodrigues (born 16 March 1993) is a Portuguese professional footballer who plays as a central defender for Super League Greece 2 club Zakynthos.

== Club career ==
Born in Fátima, Santarém District, Rodrigues finished his development at U.D. Leiria. On 5 May 2012, with the club immerse in a deep financial crisis, he made his Primeira Liga debut in a 1–0 away loss against S.L. Benfica.

In July 2012, Rodrigues signed with fellow top-division team C.D. Nacional. He played 17 matches in his first season, helping to an eighth-place finish.

Rodrigues scored his first league goal for the Madeirans – and in the top division – on 19 April 2014, as the visitors routed F.C. Paços de Ferreira 5–0 and qualified for the UEFA Europa League. His maiden appearance in the continental competition took place on 21 August of the same year, when he featured the entire 2–0 away defeat to FC Dinamo Minsk in the play-off round.

From 2016 to 2018, Rodrigues competed in the Super League Greece with Panetolikos FC. On 19 May 2018, he returned to his homeland and joined Rio Ave F.C. on a free transfer.

Rodrigues was loaned to G.D. Estoril Praia of the LigaPro in the 2019 January transfer window, for five months. Roughly one year later, he terminated his contract with Rio Ave.

After recovering from a pubalgia injury, Rodrigues competed in the third tier, representing in quick succession União de Santarém, F.C. Oliveira do Hospital and Académica de Coimbra. Subsequently, he made 18 total appearances for Slovenian PrvaLiga side NK Bravo.

On 5 July 2026, Rodrigues joined Super League Greece 2's A.P.S. Zakynthos for free.

== International career ==
Rodrigues won his only cap for Portugal at under-21 level on 4 September 2014, starting and finishing a 2–1 away victory over Norway in the 2015 UEFA European Championship qualifiers.
