= Eliseu Cassamá =

Guinea-Bissauan footballer

Personal information
- Full name: Eliseu Mendja Nadjack Soares Cassamá
- Date of birth: 6 February 1994 (age 32)
- Place of birth: Bissau, Guinea-Bissau
- Height: 1.84 m (6 ft 0 in)
- Position: Right-back

Team information
- Current team: Langenthal

Youth career
- 2010–2011: Ribeirão
- 2011–2013: Benfica

Senior career*
Years	Team	Apps	(Gls)
2013–2014	Joane	25	(2)
2014–2016	Reus	50	(0)
2016–2020	Rio Ave	41	(0)
2020–2023	Grasshoppers	10	(0)
2021–2022	Grasshoppers B	15	(0)
2024	Langenthal		
2024–2025	Schaffhausen	25	(4)
2025–	Langenthal	22	(1)

International career
2014	Portugal U20	1	(0)
2018–2019	Guinea-Bissau	7	(0)
- * Club domestic league appearances and goals as of 10:53, 6 August 2026 (UTC)

Eliseu Mendja Nadjack Soares Cassamá (born 6 February 1994) is a Bissau-Guinean professional footballer who plays as a right-back for Swiss club Langenthal.

== Club career ==
=== Early career ===
Born in Bissau, Guinea-Bissau, Cassamá started playing organised football in Portugal, his first youth team being G.D. Ribeirão. His senior debut was made in the third division, with G.D. Joane.

In summer 2014, Cassamá signed with Spanish club CF Reus Deportiu, quickly becoming first choice as well as a fan favourite. He contributed 17 games in his second season – play-offs included – helping the side reach Segunda División for the first time in their 107-year history.

=== Rio Ave ===
Cassamá returned to Portugal for the 2016–17 campaign, joining Rio Ave F.C. of the Primeira Liga on a five-year contract. He made his debut as a professional on 28 July 2016, playing the full 90 minutes in a 0–0 away draw against SK Slavia Prague in the last qualifying round of the UEFA Europa League. He also started in the second leg, being sent off for two yellow cards late into the first half as the match ended 1–1.

Cassamá missed the entire 2019–20, after suffering an injury to his right knee in training.

=== Grasshoppers ===
On 29 August 2020, Cassamá agreed to a one-year deal at Swiss Challenge League's Grasshopper Club Zürich. He played his first match on 18 September, providing one assist in a 3–2 win over FC Winterthur; he missed most of his debut season, however, due to a patellar tendon rupture ailment.

Cassamá started the following campaign with the reserve team in the 1. Liga in order to regain match fitness, returning to the main squad ahead of 2022–23. He made his Super League debut on 13 August, in a 2–2 draw at FC Sion.

Cassamá injured his patella again in October 2022, this time in training. The following 25 May, Grasshoppers announced that his contract would not be extended.

=== Later career ===
On 11 August 2024, Cassamá signed for Swiss second-tier club FC Schaffhausen.

== International career ==
Cassamá earned one cap for the Portugal under-20 team, during a 2–0 friendly win over the Slovakia under-21s in February 2014. He made his debut for his native Guinea-Bissau on 22 March 2018, starting the 2–0 defeat to Burkina Faso in another exhibition game.

Manager Baciro Candé named Cassamá in the 23-man squad for the 2019 Africa Cup of Nations in Egypt. He played the opening 2–0 loss against Cameroon on 25 June, and was replaced by Nanu for the rest of the group-stage elimination.
