= Júnio Rocha =

Brazilian footballer

Personal information
- Full name: Júnio Ricardo da Rocha
- Date of birth: 27 February 1997 (age 29)
- Place of birth: Baixo Guandu, Brazil
- Height: 1.82 m (6 ft 0 in)
- Position: Right-back

Youth career
- –2016: Ponte Preta
- 2016–2017: Internacional

Senior career*
| Years | Team | Apps | (Gls) |
| 2014–2016 | Ponte Preta | 4 | (0) |
| 2017–2019 | Internacional | 10 | (0) |
| 2018 | → Sampaio Corrêa (loan) | 0 | (0) |
| 2018–2019 | → Rio Ave (loan) | 10 | (0) |
| 2019–2022 | Rio Ave | 7 | (0) |
- * Club domestic league appearances and goals as of 15 May 2022

Júnio Ricardo da Rocha (born 27 February 1997), commonly known as Júnio Rocha or simply Júnio, is a Brazilian footballer who plays as a right-back.

== Club career ==
On 27 June 2018, Júnio joined Rio Ave on a season-long loan deal.
