= Bruno Monteiro =

Portuguese footballer

Personal information
- Full name: Bruno André Freitas Monteiro
- Date of birth: 5 October 1984 (age 42)
- Place of birth: Fafe, Portugal
- Height: 1.80 m (5 ft 11 in)
- Positions: Defensive midfielder; centre-back

Youth career
- 1997–2003: Fafe

Senior career*
Years	Team	Apps	(Gls)
2003–2008	Fafe	109	(4)
2008–2009	Boavista	29	(0)
2009–2011	Vitória Setúbal	4	(0)
2010–2011	→ Santa Clara (loan)	13	(0)
2011–2012	Tirsense	29	(2)
2012–2013	Fafe	24	(2)
2013–2014	Freamunde	32	(3)
2014–2020	Tondela	145	(5)
2020–2021	Leixões	33	(0)
2021–2022	Amarante	21	(2)
2022–2024	Fafe	46	(2)
Total		485	(20)
- * Club domestic league appearances and goals

Bruno André Freitas Monteiro (born 5 October 1984) is a Portuguese former professional footballer who played as a defensive midfielder or a central defender.

== Club career ==
Monteiro was born in Fafe, Braga District. He played five years with AD Fafe in the Portuguese third division, moving to another northern club, Boavista FC, for the 2008–09 season, and suffering relegation from the Segunda Liga.

The following campaign, Monteiro made his Primeira Liga debut with Vitória de Setúbal. He appeared in only six competitive matches during the season, being subsequently loaned in summer 2010 to C.D. Santa Clara from division two.

Monteiro joined third-tier team F.C. Tirsense after leaving Setúbal, continuing to compete there the following years. He signed a one-year contract with C.D. Tondela in the 2014 off-season, contributing 39 games and one goal in his first year as the former reached the top flight for the first time ever.

Monteiro finished his second season at the Estádio João Cardoso with 24 appearances (17 starts), helping the club to narrowly avoid relegation. He scored his first goal in the Portuguese top division on 3 December 2016, but in a 3–1 away loss against Rio Ave FC.

In the following two top-tier campaigns, Monteiro played an average of 30 matches as Tondela managed to stay afloat. In January 2020, however, as he had been deemed surplus to requirements by new manager Natxo González, the 35-year-old terminated his contract and moved to Leixões S.C. on a one-and-a-half-year deal.
