= Sérgio Marakis =

Portuguese footballer (born 1991)

Personal information
- Full name: Sérgio Romeu Marakis
- Date of birth: 11 November 1991 (age 34)
- Place of birth: Johannesburg, South Africa
- Height: 1.78 m (5 ft 10 in)
- Position: Defensive midfielder

Youth career
- 1999–2006: Marítimo
- 2006–2008: Sporting CP
- 2008–2009: Oeiras
- 2009–2010: Marítimo

Senior career*
Years	Team	Apps	(Gls)
2010–2015	Marítimo B	81	(2)
2011–2015	Marítimo	17	(1)
2014–2015	→ Portimonense (loan)	17	(0)
2015	Ermis	5	(0)
2017–2018	União Madeira	34	(1)
2018–2019	Nacional	17	(0)
2019–2020	Cova Piedade	16	(0)
2020–2021	Argeș Pitești	4	(0)
2021–2022	Horn	24	(0)
2022–2024	Nacional	27	(0)

International career
2007	Portugal U16	2	(0)
- * Club domestic league appearances and goals as of 18:57, 11 June 2024 (UTC)

Sérgio Romeu Marakis (born 11 November 1991) is a Portuguese professional footballer who plays as a defensive midfielder.

He achieved 130 appearances and three goals in the two professional divisions of Portuguese football, where he represented Marítimo, Portimonense, União, Nacional and Cova da Piedade. He also had brief spells in Cyprus, Romania and Austria.

== Club career ==
Born in Johannesburg, South Africa, Marakis was raised in Portugal, where he played as a youth mainly for C.S. Marítimo, and also briefly for Sporting CP. After playing in the former's reserves in the third division, he was called up to the first team at the end of the 2010–11 season, making his debut as a 60th-minute substitute for Rafael Miranda in a 0–2 home loss against champions FC Porto on the last day.

Marakis scored his first professional goal on 24 February 2013 in the reserves' 2–1 away defeat to Portimonense S.C. in the Segunda Liga, and got off the mark for the first team on 19 April the following year, in a 3–1 win over Académica de Coimbra at the Estádio dos Barreiros. For the 2014–15 campaign he was loaned to Portimonense, where he was ruled out by a knee injury from October to March.

After an unsuccessful 18 months at Ermis Aradippou FC in the Cypriot First Division, Marakis returned to Madeira with second-tier C.F. União in January 2017. Six months later, he became club captain. In January 2018, he terminated his contract due to delayed wages and signed an 18-month deal with a third side from the island, C.D. Nacional.

In July 2019, after winning the second division and then suffering relegation, Marakis moved on to C.D. Cova da Piedade. He subsequently went back abroad, with FC Argeș Pitești of the Romanian Liga I and SV Horn of the 2. Liga (Austria).
