= Gabrielzinho =

Brazilian footballer

Personal information
- Full name: Gabriel Airton de Souza
- Date of birth: 29 March 1996 (age 30)
- Place of birth: Araçatuba, Brazil
- Height: 1.71 m (5 ft 7 1/2 in)
- Position: Winger

Team information
- Current team: Shanghai Port
- Number: 11

Youth career
- Linense

Senior career*
Years	Team	Apps	(Gls)
2013–2017	Linense	28	(4)
2016	→ Atlético-PR (loan)	0	(0)
2017–2022	Rio Ave	95	(8)
2020	→ Moreirense (loan)	15	(2)
2022–2024	Al Wasl	14	(3)
2023–2024	→ Hatta (loan)	15	(3)
2024–2026	Moreirense	18	(3)
2025	→ Shanghai Port (loan)	26	(11)
2026–	Shanghai Port	5	(1)
- * Club domestic league appearances and goals as of 19:00, 11 April 2026 (UTC)

Gabriel Airton de Souza (born 29 March 1996), known as Gabrielzinho, is a Brazilian professional footballer who plays as a winger for Chinese Super League club Shanghai Port.

== Career ==
=== Linense ===
Gabrielzinho made his league debut against Santos on 1 March 2015. He scored his first league goal against Ituano on 24 July 2016, scoring in the 40th minute.

=== Rio Ave ===
On 25 July 2017, Gabrielzinho was announced at Rio Ave. He made his league debut against Boavista on 12 August 2017. He scored his first league goal against Portimonense on 2 September 2018, scoring in the 48th minute.

=== Moreirense ===
Gabrielzinho scored on his league debut against Gil Vicente on 2 February 2020, scoring in the 21st minute.

=== Al Wasl ===
Gabrielzinho made his league debut against Al Wahda on 2 September 2022. He scored his first league goals against Al-Nasr on 1 October 2022, scoring in the 20th and 47th minute.

=== Hatta ===
Gabrielzinho made his league debut against Khor Fakkan on 19 August 2023. He scored his first league goal against Al Ain on 29 February 2024, scoring in the 49th minute.

=== Return to Moreirense ===
On 5 August 2024 it was confirmed that Gabrielzinho returned to Moreirense on a deal until 2026.

=== Shanghai Port ===
On 27 January 2025, Gabrielzinho joined Chinese Super League club Shanghai Port on loan until December 2025, with an option-to-buy. On 31 January 2026, Moreirense announced that Gabrielzinho had permanently left the club and joined Shanghai Port, where he signed a two-year contract.

== Career statistics ==
As of match played 11 April 2026

Appearances and goals by club, season and competition
Club	Season	League			State league		Cup		League cup		Continental		Other		Total	
Club	Season	Division	Apps	Goals	Apps	Goals	Apps	Goals	Apps	Goals	Apps	Goals	Apps	Goals	Apps	Goals
Linense	2013	Paulista	—		—		—		—		—		9 (Note: All appearance(s) in Copa Paulista)	1	9	1
Linense	2015	Paulista	—		3	0	—		—		—		11	0	14	0
Linense	2016	Série D	6	1	6	0	2	0	—		—		—		14	1
Linense	2017	Paulista	—		1	1	—		—		—		—		1	1
Linense	Total		6	1	10	1	2	0	—		—		20	1	38	3
Rio Ave	2017–18	Primeira Liga	11	0	—		0	0	2	0	—		—		13	0
Rio Ave	2018–19	Primeira Liga	27	3	—		3	0	4	1	2	0	—		36	4
Rio Ave	2019–20	Primeira Liga	8	0	—		2	0	2	0	—		—		12	0
Rio Ave	2020–21	Primeira Liga	18	0	—		3	1	0	0	3	0	1	0	25	1
Rio Ave	2021–22	Liga Portugal 2	31	5	—		4	2	4	0	—		—		38	7
Rio Ave	Total		95	8	—		12	3	12	1	5	0	1	0	125	12
Moreirense (loan)	2019–20	Primeira Liga	15	2	—		—		—		—		—		15	2
Al Wasl (loan)	2022–23	UAE Pro League	14	3	—		1	0	1	0	—		—		16	3
Hatta Club (loan)	2023–24	UAE Pro League	15	3	—		0	0	1	0	—		—		16	3
Moreirense	2024–25	Primeira Liga	18	3	—		2	0	1	0	—		—		20	3
Shanghai Port (loan)	2025	Chinese Super League	26	11	—		2	2	—		3	1	1	2	32	16
Shanghai Port	2026	Chinese Super League	5	1	—		0	0	—		2	0	1	0	8	1
Shanghai Port	Total		31	12	—		2	2	—		5	1	2	2	40	17
Career total			184	32	10	1	19	5	15	1	10	1	23	3	261	43

== Honours ==
Shanghai Port

- Chinese Super League: 2025
