= 2018 Taça da Liga final =

- Event: 2017–18 Taça da Liga
| Vitória de Setúbal | Sporting CP |
| 1 | 1 |
- Sporting CP won 5–4 on penalties
- Date: 27 January 2018
- Venue: Estádio Municipal de Braga, Braga
- Referee: Rui Costa
- Attendance: 24,137

The 2018 Taça da Liga final was the final match of the 2017–18 Taça da Liga, the 11th season of the Taça da Liga. It was played on 27 January 2018 at Estádio Municipal de Braga.

The competition involved the 33 clubs playing in the top two tiers of the Portuguese football league system – 18 from Primeira Liga and 15 from Segunda Liga – during the 2017–18 season. Reserve sides of Primeira Liga teams that played in the 2017–18 Segunda Liga were excluded from the competition.

Vitória de Setúbal and Sporting CP faced off in a repeat of the competition's first final, held 10 years previously. Sporting CP won 5–4 on a penalty shoot-out after a 1–1 draw at the end of 90 minutes, winning the competition for the first time in their history.

== Background ==
For the second consecutive season, this competition featured a final four format with both the semi-finals and the final being played over a space of a few days in the same venue. The Estádio Municipal de Braga hosted all matches. The two teams had played in the inaugural final in 2008 with Vitória de Setúbal winning on penalty kicks. Sporting CP had the chance to win their first Taça da Liga while Vitória de Setúbal could be the first team, other than Benfica, to win the competition multiple times. Both teams were aiming for their first title of the season.

== Route to the final ==
Note: In all results below, the score of the finalist is given first (H: home; A: away; N: neutral).

| Vitória de Setúbal | | | Round | Sporting CP | | |
|---|---|---|---|---|---|---|
| Opponent | Result | Stadium | First round | Opponent | Result | Stadium |
| Bye | | | First round | Bye | | |
| Opponent | Result | Stadium | Second round | Opponent | Result | Stadium |
| Tondela | 1–0 (H) | Estádio do Bonfim | Second round | Bye | | |
| Opponent | Result | Stadium | Third round | Opponent | Result | Stadium |
| Portimonense | 2–1 (A) | Estádio Municipal de Portimão | Matchday 1 | Marítimo | 0–0 (H) | Estádio de Alvalade |
| Braga | 2–1 (H) | Estádio do Bonfim | Matchday 2 | União da Madeira | 6–0 (H) | Estádio de Alvalade |
| Benfica | 2–2 (H) | Estádio do Bonfim | Matchday 3 | Belenenses | 0–0 (A) | Estádio do Restelo |
| Group A winners: Team / Pld / W / D / L / GF / GA / GD / Pts; Vitória de Setúbal / 3 / 2 / 1 / 0 / 6 / 4 / +2 / 7; Benfica / 3 / 0 / 3 / 0 / 5 / 5 / 0 / 3; Braga / 3 / 0 / 2 / 1 / 4 / 5 / −1 / 2; Portimonense / 3 / 0 / 2 / 1 / 5 / 6 / −1 / 2 | | | Final standings | Group B winners: Team / Pld / W / D / L / GF / GA / GD / Pts; Sporting CP / 3 / 1 / 2 / 0 / 7 / 1 / +6 / 5; Marítimo / 3 / 1 / 2 / 0 / 3 / 2 / +1 / 5; Belenenses / 3 / 0 / 3 / 0 / 2 / 2 / 0 / 3; União da Madeira / 3 / 0 / 1 / 2 / 3 / 10 / −7 / 1 | | |
| Opponent | Result | Stadium | Knockout phase | Opponent | Result | Stadium |
| Oliveirense | 2–0 (N) | Estádio Municipal de Braga | Semi-finals | Porto | 0–0 (4–3p) (N) | Estádio Municipal de Braga |

== Match ==
=== Summary ===
Gonçalo Paciência opened the scoreline with an early goal after disputing the ball with Uruguayan Sebastián Coates, a left-foot strike on the turn to the bottom left corner from just outside the box. Both teams had clear chances to score throughout the match, with Sporting CP trying a breakthrough heading to the final third of the match. Sporting CP managed to equalise late in the game when it was determined, with the help of the video assistant referee, Vitória de Setúbal midfielder Tomás Podstawski had handballed inside his area after a series of saves by their goalkeeper Pedro Trigueira. Dutch forward Bas Dost scored the subsequent penalty low to the middle. After the 90 minutes, the match was settled by a penalty shoot-out. Sporting CP won as Podstawski was the only player to miss his penalty after he hit the crossbar. The match had one of the highest amounts of yellow cards in the competition's final, a total of nine, six for Vitória de Setúbal, including Edinho, who was booked after taking his penalty.

=== Details ===
27 January 2018
20:45 WET (UTC±00:00)

| Vitória de Setúbal | 1–1 | Sporting CP |
|---|---|---|
| Paciência 4' | Report | Dost 80' (pen.) |
Penalties
| Paciêcia (penalty scored); Patrick (penalty scored); Podstawski (penalty missed); Edinho (penalty scored); Issoko (penalty scored) | 4–5 | (penalty scored) Dost; (penalty scored) Fernandes; (penalty scored) Mathieu; (penalty scored) Coates; (penalty scored) Carvalho |

Estádio Municipal de Braga, Braga
Attendance: 24,137
Referee: Rui Costa

| Vitória de Setúbal | Sporting CP |

| GK | 88 | (Portugal) Pedro Trigueira | (yellow card) 67' |
| RB | 7 | (Democratic Republic of the Congo) Arnold Issoko | (yellow card) 90+4' |
| CB | 29 | (Portugal) José Semedo | (yellow card) 19' |
| CB | 14 | (Portugal) Pedro Pinto |
| CB | 13 | (Guinea-Bissau) Vasco Fernandes (c) | (yellow card) 88' |
| LB | 21 | (Portugal) Nuno Pinto |
| RM | 24 | (Portugal) João Amaral | | (substituted off) 90+2' |
| CM | 10 | (Portugal) João Teixeira | | (substituted off) 82' |
| CM | 6 | (Portugal) Tomás Podstawski | (yellow card) 78' |
| LM | 11 | (Portugal) Costinha | | (substituted off) 88' |
| FW | 9 | (Portugal) Gonçalo Paciência |
Substitutes:
| GK | 1 | (Portugal) Cristiano |
| DF | 91 | (Brazil) Patrick Vieira | | (substituted in) 88' |
| MF | 86 | (Nigeria) Jacob Adebanjo |
| MF | 16 | (Portugal) André Sousa |
| MF | 27 | (Portugal) André Pedrosa | | (substituted in) 82' |
| FW | 33 | (Brazil) Allef |
| FW | 36 | (Portugal) Edinho | Booked | (substituted in) 90+2' |
Manager:
(Portugal) José Couceiro

| GK | 1 | (Portugal) Rui Patrício (c) |
| RB | 92 | (Italy) Cristiano Piccini |
| CB | 4 | (Uruguay) Sebastián Coates | (yellow card) 30' |
| CB | 22 | (France) Jérémy Mathieu |
| LB | 5 | (Portugal) Fábio Coentrão |
| DM | 14 | (Portugal) William Carvalho | (yellow card) 51' |
| RM | 8 | (Portugal) Bruno Fernandes |
| CM | 7 | (Portugal) Rúben Ribeiro | | (substituted off) 46' |
| LM | 20 | (Costa Rica) Bryan Ruiz | | (substituted off) 46' |
| CF | 28 | (Netherlands) Bas Dost |
| CF | 40 | (Colombia) Fredy Montero | | (substituted off) 64' |
Substitutes:
| GK | 18 | (France) Romain Salin |
| DF | 6 | (Portugal) André Pinto |
| DF | 13 | (North Macedonia) Stefan Ristovski |
| MF | 11 | (Brazil) Bruno César |
| MF | 16 | (Argentina) Rodrigo Battaglia | | (substituted in) 46' |
| FW | 9 | (Argentina) Marcos Acuña | (yellow card) 72' | (substituted in) 46' |
| FW | 88 | (Ivory Coast) Seydou Doumbia | | (substituted in) 64' |
Manager:
(Portugal) Jorge Jesus

Assistant referees:
Nuno Manso
Tiago Costa
Fourth official:
Manuel Oliveira
Video assistant referee:
João Pinheira
Assistant video assistant referee:
Nuno Eiras

Match rules

- 90 minutes.
- Penalty shoot-out if scores still level.
- Seven named substitutes.
- Maximum of three substitutions.

== See also ==
- 2017–18 Sporting CP season
- 2018 Taça de Portugal final
