= 2017–18 Taça da Liga =

Taça CTT

Tournament details
- Country: Portugal
- Dates: 23 July 2017 – 27 January 2018
- Teams: 33

Final positions
- Champions: Sporting CP (1st title)
- Runners-up: Vitória de Setúbal

Tournament statistics
- Matches played: 43
- Goals scored: 112 (2.6 per match)
- Top goal scorer(s): Gonçalo Paciência (5 goals)
- All statistics correct as of 27 January 2018.

The 2017–18 Taça da Liga was the eleventh edition of the Taça da Liga (also known as Taça CTT for sponsorship reasons), a football cup competition organised by the Liga Portuguesa de Futebol Profissional (LPFP) and contested exclusively by clubs competing in the top two professional tiers of Portuguese football. It began on 23 July 2017 and concluded on 27 January 2018 with the final at Estádio Municipal de Braga in Braga.

A total of 33 teams entered this tournament, including 18 teams from the 2017–18 Primeira Liga and 15 non-reserve teams from the 2017–18 LigaPro. The competition format suffered changes for a third consecutive season to accommodate a reduction in the number of participating teams, particularly from the LigaPro.

Moreirense were the title holders, beating 2012–13 winners Braga 1–0 in the previous final to win their first-ever title in a national competition, but were eliminated in the third round. In a repeat of the competition's first final held 10 years previously, Sporting defeated Vitória de Setúbal 5–4 on penalties (1–1 after ninety minutes) in the final to win the title for the first time in the club's history.

== Format ==
Fifteen teams competing in the 2017–18 LigaPro (reserve teams from Primeira Liga clubs are excluded) took part in the first round; one-legged ties were played between fourteen teams, with the fifteenth team receiving a bye to the next round.

In the second round, the eight teams advancing from the previous round (seven winners plus the team with a bye) were joined by the twelve teams placed 5th–16th in the 2016–17 Primeira Liga and by the two teams promoted to 2017–18 Primeira Liga. Again, one-legged ties were played between 20 teams, with two teams receiving a bye to the next round.

The third round featured the twelve teams advancing from the previous round (ten winners plus the two teams with a bye) and the four best-placed teams in the 2016–17 Primeira Liga. The sixteen teams are drawn into four groups that will be contested in a single round-robin format, with each team playing at least one game at home. The four group winners qualified for the semi-finals, which were played as single-legged ties. The semi-finals and final were played at a neutral venue.

Round	Teams entering in this round	Teams advancing from previous round
First round (15 teams)	15 teams competing in the 2017–18 LigaPro	
Second round (22 teams)	12 teams ranked 5th–16th in the 2016–17 Primeira Liga; 2 teams promoted to the 2017–18 Primeira Liga	7 winners from the first round; 1 team that received a bye
Third round (16 teams)	4 teams ranked 1st–4th in the 2016–17 Primeira Liga	10 winners from the second round; 2 teams that received a bye
Semi-finals (4 teams)		4 group winners from the third round
Final (2 teams)		2 winners from the semi-finals

=== Tiebreakers ===
In the third round, teams are ranked according to points (3 points for a win, 1 point for a draw, 0 points for a loss). If two or more teams are tied on points on completion of the group matches, the following criteria are applied to determine the rankings:

1. highest goal difference in all group matches;
2. highest number of scored goals in all group matches;
3. lowest average age of all players fielded in all group matches (sum of the ages of all fielded players divided by the number of fielded players).

In all other rounds, teams tied at the end of regular time contest a penalty shootout to determine the winner.

== Teams ==
Thirty-three teams competing in the two professional tiers of Portuguese football for the 2017–18 season are eligible to participate in this competition. For Primeira Liga teams, the final position in the previous league season determined in which round they enter the competition.

Third round (Primeira Liga)
Benfica (1st)	Porto (2nd)	Sporting CP (3rd)	Vitória de Guimarães (4th)
Second round (Primeira Liga)
Braga (5th)	Marítimo (6th)	Rio Ave (7th)	Feirense (8th)
Boavista (9th)	Estoril (10th)	Chaves (11th)	Vitória de Setúbal (12th)
Paços de Ferreira (13th)	Belenenses (14th)	Moreirense (15th)	Tondela (16th)
Portimonense (P1)	Desportivo das Aves (P1)		
First round (LigaPro)
Arouca (R1)	Nacional (R1)	União da Madeira (3rd)	Penafiel (5th)
Académica (6th)	Sporting da Covilhã (8th)	Varzim (9th)	Santa Clara (10th)
Gil Vicente (13th)	Famalicão (15th)	Cova da Piedade (16th)	Académico de Viseu (17th)
Leixões (18th)	Oliveirense (P2)	Real (P2)	

Key

- Nth: League position in the 2016–17 season
- P1: Promoted to the Primeira Liga
- P2: Promoted to the LigaPro
- R1: Relegated to the LigaPro

== Schedule ==
All draws were held at the LPFP headquarters in Porto.

Round		Draw date	Match date(s)	Teams	Fixtures
First round		7 July 2017	23 July 2017	33 → 26	7
Second round		7 July 2017	29–30 July, 1–3 September 2017	26 → 12	10
Third round	Matchday 1	7 September 2017	19–20 September, 7–8, 10, 26 October, 28 November 2017	16 → 4	24
Third round	Matchday 2	7 September 2017	24 October, 11 November, 20–22 December 2017	16 → 4	24
Third round	Matchday 3	7 September 2017	29–30 December 2017	16 → 4	24
Final four	Semi-finals	7 September 2017	23–24 January 2018	4 → 2	2
Final four	Final	7 September 2017	27 January 2018	2 → 1	1

== First round ==
The 15 non-reserve teams competing in the 2017–18 LigaPro entered the competition in this round. Fourteen teams were paired against each other for seven single-legged ties, while the fifteenth team (Real) was given a bye to the next round. The draw took place on 7 July 2017, and matches were played on 23 July 2017.

23 July 2017	Sporting da Covilhã	1–1 (3–4 p)	União da Madeira	Covilhã
16:00 WEST (UTC+01:00)	Seidi 49'	Report	Gonçalo 2'	Stadium: Complexo Desportivo da Covilhã; Attendance: 339; Referee: Bruno Rebocho
	Penalties
	Joel (penalty scored); Turé (penalty missed); Fatai (penalty scored); Reis (penalty scored); Seidi (penalty missed)		(penalty scored) Gonçalo; (penalty missed) Mica; (penalty scored) Júnior; (penalty scored) Henrique; (penalty scored) Marakis

23 July 2017	Cova da Piedade	3–2	Nacional	Cova da Piedade
16:00 WEST (UTC+01:00)	Ballack 10'; Firmino 12'; Floro 44'	Report	Gomes 1', 45'	Stadium: Estádio Municipal José Martins Vieira; Attendance: 737; Referee: Sérgio Piscarreta

23 July 2017	Famalicão	1–2	Santa Clara	Vila Nova de Famalicão
16:00 WEST (UTC+01:00)	Meneses 45+2'	Report	Fernando 11'; Rashid 35'	Stadium: Estádio Municipal 22 de Junho; Attendance: 1,506; Referee: Claúdio Pereira

23 July 2017	Leixões	2–0	Académico de Viseu	Matosinhos
16:00 WEST (UTC+01:00)	Kukula 6'; Breitner 23'	Report		Stadium: Estádio do Mar; Attendance: 1,138; Referee: Fábio Piló

23 July 2017	Penafiel	0–1	Oliveirense	Penafiel
17:00 WEST (UTC+01:00)		Report	J. Amorim 50'	Stadium: Estádio Municipal 25 de Abril; Attendance: 506; Referee: Carlos Espadinha

23 July 2017	Varzim	1–2	Gil Vicente	Póvoa de Varzim
18:00 WEST (UTC+01:00)	Nelsinho 50'	Report	Rubio 52'; Vasco 66' (o.g.)	Stadium: Estádio do Varzim SC; Attendance: 1,144; Referee: André Moreira

23 July 2017	Académica	0–0 (2–4 p)	Arouca	Coimbra
19:30 WEST (UTC+01:00)		Report		Stadium: Estádio Cidade de Coimbra; Attendance: 1,171; Referee: Jorge Costa
	Penalties
	Djoussé (penalty scored); Moura (penalty missed); Empis (penalty missed); Lagoa (penalty scored)		(penalty scored) Paločević; (penalty scored) Jubal; (penalty scored) Coelho; (penalty missed) Valente; (penalty scored) Kuca

== Second round ==
In the second round, the seven first-round winners and Real, who were given a bye to this round, joined the 12 teams ranked 5th–16th in the 2016–17 Primeira Liga and the two teams promoted from the 2015–16 LigaPro. Twenty teams were paired against each other for ten single-legged ties, while Feirense and Leixões were given a bye to the next round. The draw took place on 7 July 2017, and matches were played between 29 July 2017 and 3 September 2017.

29 July 2017	Belenenses	0–1 (Note: Real were later disqualified from the tournament for fielding a suspended player in this match.)	Real	Lisbon
17:00 WEST (UTC+01:00)		Report	Carlos Vinícius 58'	Stadium: Estádio do Restelo; Attendance: 1,475; Referee: Humberto Teixeira

30 July 2017	Oliveirense	2–1	Santa Clara	Santa Maria da Feira
16:00 WEST (UTC+01:00)	Riascos 60'; Clayton 90'	Report	Santana 8'	Stadium: Estádio Marcolino de Castro; Attendance: 495; Referee: Fábio Piló

30 July 2017	Arouca	1–2	Paços de Ferreira	Arouca
16:00 WEST (UTC+01:00)	Cícero 7'	Report	Xavier 52'; Medeiros 76'	Stadium: Estádio Municipal de Arouca; Attendance: 1,145; Referee: Carlos Espadinha

30 July 2017	União da Madeira	2–1	Gil Vicente	Funchal
16:00 WEST (UTC+01:00)	Luan 75', 86'	Report	Rubio 76'	Stadium: Centro Desportivo da Madeira; Attendance: 727; Referee: Daniel Cardoso

30 July 2017	Vitória de Setúbal	1–0	Tondela	Setúbal
18:00 WEST (UTC+01:00)	Willyan 55'	Report		Stadium: Estádio do Bonfim; Attendance: 1,473; Referee: Sérgio Piscarreta

30 July 2017	Moreirense	1–0	Desportivo das Aves	Moreira de Cónegos
16:00 WEST (UTC+01:00)	Costa 55'	Report		Stadium: Parque de Jogos Comendador Joaquim de Almeida Freitas; Attendance: 2,260; Referee: André Narciso

1 September 2017	Marítimo	1–0	Estoril	Funchal
16:00 WEST (UTC+01:00)	Pinho 30'	Report		Stadium: Estádio do Marítimo; Attendance: 4,394; Referee: Manuel Mota

2 September 2017	Rio Ave	2–0	Cova da Piedade	Vila do Conde
18:00 WEST (UTC+01:00)	Marcelo 3'; Marcão 83'	Report		Stadium: Estádio dos Arcos; Attendance: 1,005; Referee: Vítor Ferreira

2 September 2017	Portimonense	3–1	Chaves	Portimão
16:00 WEST (UTC+01:00)	Pessoa 16'; Paulinho 51'; Fabrício 73'	Report	Tiba 4'	Stadium: Estádio Municipal de Portimão; Attendance: 1,257; Referee: Bruno Esteves

3 September 2017	Boavista	1–2	Braga	Porto
19:00 WEST (UTC+01:00)	Santos 11'	Report	Martins 32'; Paulinho 80'	Stadium: Estádio do Bessa; Attendance: 4,185; Referee: Rui Oliveira

== Third round ==
In the third round, the 10 second-round winners plus Feirense and Leixões, who were given a bye to this round, joined the four top-ranked teams from the 2016–17 Primeira Liga: Benfica (1st), Porto (2nd), Sporting CP (3rd) and Vitória de Guimarães (4th). These 16 teams were drawn into four groups of four, each group containing one of the four top-ranked Primeira Liga teams who each hosted their first two group matches. Group matches were played in a single round-robin format, ensuring that each team plays at least one match at home. The draw took place on 7 September 2017, and matches were played between 19 September and 30 December 2017.

Real, who had eliminated Belenenses in the previous round, were disqualified after it was determined that they fielded irregularly a punished player during their second-round match. As a result, Belenenses were repechaged and allocated into Group B, with Portimonense reallocated into Group A to occupy Real's vacancy.

=== Group A ===
Pos	Team	Pld	W	D	L	GF	GA	GD	Pts	Qualification
1	Vitória de Setúbal	3	2	1	0	6	4	+2	7	Advanced to knockout phase
2	Benfica	3	0	3	0	5	5	0	3	
3	Braga	3	0	2	1	4	5	−1	2	
4	Portimonense	3	0	2	1	5	6	−1	2	

Source: LPFP
Rules for classification: Tiebreakers

20 September 2017	Benfica	1–1	Braga	Lisbon
21:15 WEST (UTC+01:00)	Jiménez 10'	Report	Ferreira 68'	Stadium: Estádio da Luz; Attendance: 24,160; Referee: Bruno Esteves

26 October 2017	Portimonense	1–2	Vitória de Setúbal	Portimão
16:00 WEST (UTC+01:00)	Pires 54'	Report	Edinho 84'; Paciência 88'	Stadium: Estádio Municipal de Portimão; Attendance: 1,610; Referee: Gonçalo Martins

20 December 2017	Benfica	2–2	Portimonense	Lisbon
16:00 WET (UTC+00:00)	Jonas 1'; López 33'	Report	Pires 47'; Jadson 84'	Stadium: Estádio da Luz; Attendance: 21,355; Referee: Manuel Oliveira

22 December 2017	Vitória de Setúbal	2–1	Braga	Setúbal
16:00 WET (UTC+00:00)	Paciência 31', 49'	Report	Costinha 45+2' (o.g.)	Stadium: Estádio do Bonfim; Attendance: 1,495; Referee: Fábio Veríssimo

29 December 2017	Braga	2–2	Portimonense	Braga
16:00 WET (UTC±00:00)	Eduardo 6'; Viana 31'	Report	Dener 39', 78'	Stadium: Estádio Municipal de Braga; Attendance: 2,994; Referee: Manuel Mota

29 December 2017	Vitória de Setúbal	2–2	Benfica	Setúbal
21:15 WET (UTC±00:00)	Fernandes 30'; P. Pinto 38'	Report	Seferovic 52'; Dias 59'	Stadium: Estádio do Bonfim; Attendance: 2,736; Referee: Luís Ferreira

=== Group B ===
Pos	Team	Pld	W	D	L	GF	GA	GD	Pts	Qualification
1	Sporting CP	3	1	2	0	7	1	+6	5	Advanced to knockout phase
2	Marítimo	3	1	2	0	3	2	+1	5	
3	Belenenses	3	0	3	0	2	2	0	3	
4	União da Madeira	3	0	1	2	3	10	−7	1	

Source: LPFP
Rules for classification: Tiebreakers

19 September 2017	Sporting CP	0–0	Marítimo	Lisbon
20:15 WEST (UTC+01:00)		Report		Stadium: Estádio de Alvalade; Attendance: 22,127; Referee: Manuel Mota

28 November 2017	União da Madeira	1–1	Belenenses	Funchal
16:00 WEST (UTC+01:00)	Júnior 72'	Report	Hernández 12'	Stadium: Centro Desportivo da Madeira; Attendance: 336; Referee: Manuel Mota

20 December 2017	Sporting CP	6–0	União da Madeira	Lisbon
21:15 WEST (UTC+00:00)	Doumbia 20', 61'; Mathieu 51'; Martins 67'; Coates 79'; Medeiros 81'	Report		Stadium: Estádio de Alvalade; Attendance: 8,713; Referee: Vasco Santos

21 December 2017	Belenenses	0–0	Marítimo	Lisbon
16:00 WET (UTC+00:00)		Report		Stadium: Estádio do Restelo; Attendance: 747; Referee: Luís Godinho

29 December 2017	Marítimo	3–2	União da Madeira	Funchal
19:15 WET (UTC±00:00)	Everton 11'; Pinho 79', 87'	Report	Nduwarugira 15'; Luan 19'	Stadium: Estádio dos Barreiros; Attendance: 4,581; Referee: Tiago Martins

29 December 2017	Belenenses	1–1	Sporting CP	Lisbon
19:15 WET (UTC±00:00)	Coates 75' (o.g.)	Report	Acuña 74'	Stadium: Estádio do Restelo; Attendance: 6,897; Referee: João Pinheiro

=== Group C ===
Pos	Team	Pld	W	D	L	GF	GA	GD	Pts	Qualification
1	Oliveirense	3	1	2	0	6	3	+3	5	Advanced to knockout phase
2	Moreirense	3	1	2	0	5	4	+1	5	
3	Feirense	3	0	2	1	4	5	−1	2	
4	Vitória de Guimarães	3	0	2	1	5	8	−3	2	

Source: LPFP
Rules for classification: Tiebreakers

7 October 2017	Vitória de Guimarães	1–1	Feirense	Guimarães
15:00 WEST (UTC+01:00)	Raphinha 38'	Report	Luís Henrique 50'	Stadium: Estádio D. Afonso Henriques; Attendance: 9,071; Referee: Manuel Oliveira

10 October 2017	Oliveirense	0–0	Moreirense	Oliveira de Azeméis
16:00 WEST (UTC+01:00)		Report		Stadium: Estádio Carlos Osório; Attendance: 128

11 November 2017	Vitória de Guimarães	1–4	Oliveirense	Guimarães
15:00 WEST (UTC+01:00)	Rincón 12'	Report	Xandão 2'; Riascos 9'; Amorim 36'; Valente 79'	Stadium: Estádio D. Afonso Henriques; Attendance: 7,423; Referee: António Nobre

11 November 2017	Moreirense	2–1	Feirense	Moreira de Cónegos
16:00 WEST (UTC+01:00)	Arsénio 34'; Santos 36'	Report	Valencia 18'	Stadium: Parque de Jogos Comendador Joaquim de Almeida Freitas; Attendance: 569; Referee: Hélder Malheiro

30 December 2017	Moreirense	3–3	Vitória de Guimarães	Moreira de Cónegos
18:15 WET (UTC±00:00)	Semedo 28'; Aouacheria 41'; Arsénio 67'	Report	Hurtado 9', 23'; Rincón 64'	Stadium: Parque de Jogos Comendador Joaquim de Almeida Freitas; Attendance: 1,990; Referee: Hugo Miguel

30 December 2017	Feirense	2–2	Oliveirense	Santa Maria da Feira
18:15 WET (UTC±00:00)	Valencia 79'; Ramos 90+9'	Report	Gonçalves 17'; Riascos 59'	Stadium: Estádio Marcolino de Castro; Attendance: 1,596; Referee: Jorge Sousa

=== Group D ===
Pos	Team	Pld	W	D	L	GF	GA	GD	Pts	Qualification
1	Porto	3	2	1	0	6	2	+4	7	Advanced to knockout phase
2	Leixões	3	1	1	1	3	3	0	4	
3	Rio Ave	3	1	1	1	4	6	−2	4	
4	Paços de Ferreira	3	0	1	2	3	5	−2	1	

Source: LPFP
Rules for classification: Tiebreakers

20 September 2017	Leixões	1–0	Paços de Ferreira	Matosinhos
16:00 WEST (UTC+01:00)	Belima 55'	Report		Stadium: Estádio do Mar; Attendance: 756; Referee: Hélder Malheiro

8 October 2017	Paços de Ferreira	1–1	Rio Ave	Paços de Ferreira
15:00 WEST (UTC+01:00)	Mabil 54'	Report	Barreto 90+3'	Stadium: Estádio Capital do Móvel; Attendance: 753; Referee: João Capela

24 October 2017	Porto	0–0	Leixões	Porto
20:15 WEST (UTC+01:00)		Report		Stadium: Estádio do Dragão; Attendance: 26,207; Referee: Vasco Santos

21 December 2017	Porto	3–0	Rio Ave	Porto
21:15 WET (UTC+00:00)	Soares 11'; Marega 21'; Aboubakar 90+1' (pen.)	Report		Stadium: Estádio do Dragão; Attendance: 27,911; Referee: Nuno Almeida

30 December 2017	Rio Ave	3–2	Leixões	Vila do Conde
20:15 WET (UTC±00:00)	Víto 16'; Novais 62', 67'	Report	Kukula 42', 84'	Stadium: Estádio do Rio Ave FC; Attendance: 2,253; Referee: Hélder Malheiro

30 December 2017	Paços de Ferreira	2–3	Porto	Paços de Ferreira
20:15 WET (UTC±00:00)	Luiz Phellype 30', 45'	Report	Reyes 17'; Brahimi 21'; Aboubakar 49'	Stadium: Estádio Capital do Móvel; Attendance: 5,227; Referee: Bruno Esteves

== Knockout phase ==
The knockout phase is contested as a final-four tournament by the four third-round group winners. The winners of Groups A and B play the winners of Groups C and D, respectively, in one-legged semi-finals, to determine the two finalist teams. All matches are being played at Estádio Municipal de Braga, in Braga, with the semi-finals played on 23 and 24 January, and the final scheduled for 27 January 2018.

Semi-finals
23 January – Estádio Municipal de Braga
Vitória de Setúbal	2
Oliveirense	0
24 January – Estádio Municipal de Braga
Sporting CP (p)	0 (4)
Porto	0 (3)

Final
27 January – Estádio Municipal de Braga
Vitória de Setúbal	1 (4)
Sporting CP (p)	1 (5)

=== Semi-finals ===
23 January 2018
20:45 WET (UTC±00:00)

Vitória de Setúbal	2–0	Oliveirense
Paciência 27'; Allef 90+2'	Report

Estádio Municipal de Braga, Braga
Attendance: 1,600
Referee: Manuel Mota

24 January 2018
20:45 WET (UTC±00:00)

Sporting CP	0–0	Porto
	Report
Penalties
Dost (penalty scored); Fernandes (penalty scored); Mathieu (penalty scored); Coates (penalty missed); Carvalho (penalty missed); B. Ruiz (penalty scored)	4–3	(penalty scored) Telles; (penalty scored) Marcano; (penalty missed) Herrera; (penalty scored) Waris; (penalty missed) Aboubakar; (penalty missed) Brahimi

Estádio Municipal de Braga, Braga
Attendance: 26,536
Referee: Nuno Almeida

=== Final ===
27 January 2018
20:45 WET (UTC±00:00)

Vitória de Setúbal	1–1	Sporting CP
Paciência 4'	Report	Dost 80' (pen.)
Penalties
Paciêcia (penalty scored); Patrick (penalty scored); Podstawski (penalty missed); Edinho (penalty scored); Issoko (penalty scored)	4–5	(penalty scored) Dost; (penalty scored) Fernandes; (penalty scored) Mathieu; (penalty scored) Coates; (penalty scored) Carvalho

Estádio Municipal de Braga, Braga
Attendance: 24,137
Referee: Rui Costa
