= 2017–18 Sporting CP season =

Sporting CP
2017–18 season
- President: Bruno de Carvalho
- Manager: Jorge Jesus
- Stadium: Estádio José Alvalade
- Primeira Liga: 3rd
- Taça de Portugal: Runners-up
- Taça da Liga: Winners
- Champions League: Group stage
- Europa League: Quarter-finals
- Top goalscorer: League: Bas Dost (27); All: Bas Dost (34)
- Highest home attendance: 49,339; Sporting CP 0–0 Benfica (5 May 2018)
- Lowest home attendance: 8,713; Sporting CP 6–0 União Madeira (20 December 2017)
- Average home league attendance: 43332 (16 home league games)
- Biggest win: Sporting CP 6–0 União Madeira (20 December 2017)
- Biggest defeat: Barcelona 2–0 Sporting CP (5 December 2017); Atlético Madrid 2–0 Sporting CP (5 April 2018)
Home colours	Away colours	Stromp colours
- All statistics correct as of 1 February 2018.

This article shows Sporting CP's player statistics and all matches that the club played during the 2017–18 season.

== Players ==
=== Current squad ===
As of 1 February 2018

Note: Flags indicate national team as defined under FIFA eligibility rules; some limited exceptions apply. Players may hold more than one non-FIFA nationality.

No.	Pos.	Nation	Player
1	GK	POR	Rui Patrício (vice-captain)
4	DF	URU	Sebastián Coates
5	DF	POR	Fábio Coentrão (on loan from Real Madrid)
6	DF	POR	André Pinto
7	FW	POR	Rúben Ribeiro
8	MF	POR	Bruno Fernandes
9	FW	ARG	Marcos Acuña
11	MF	BRA	Bruno César
13	DF	MKD	Stefan Ristovski
14	MF	POR	William Carvalho (captain)
15	DF	GHA	Lumor Agbenyenu
16	MF	ARG	Rodrigo Battaglia
17	FW	POR	Daniel Podence
18	GK	FRA	Romain Salin

No.	Pos.	Nation	Player
19	DF	NED	Douglas
20	FW	CRC	Bryan Ruiz
22	DF	FRA	Jérémy Mathieu
25	MF	SRB	Radosav Petrović
27	MF	CRO	Josip Mišić
28	FW	NED	Bas Dost
37	MF	BRA	Wendel
40	FW	COL	Fredy Montero
66	MF	POR	João Palhinha
77	FW	POR	Gelson Martins
82	GK	POR	Pedro Silva
88	FW	CIV	Seydou Doumbia (on loan from Roma)
92	DF	ITA	Cristiano Piccini

=== Out on loan ===
Note: Flags indicate national team as defined under FIFA eligibility rules; some limited exceptions apply. Players may hold more than one non-FIFA nationality.

No.	Pos.	Nation	Player
—	DF	BRA	Jefferson (at Braga until 30 June 2018)
—	DF	ARG	Jonathan Silva (at Roma until 30 June 2023)
—	DF	POR	Tobias Figueiredo (at Nottingham Forest until 30 June 2018)
—	MF	BRA	Bruno Paulista (at Vasco da Gama until 31 December 2018)
—	MF	POR	Francisco Geraldes (at Rio Ave until 30 June 2018)
—	MF	BRA	Mattheus Oliveira (at Vitória de Guimarães until 30 June 2018)
—	MF	SCO	Ryan Gauld (at Desportivo das Aves until 30 June 2018)
—	MF	BUL	Simeon Slavchev (at Lechia Gdańsk until 30 June 2018)
—	FW	POR	Carlos Mané (at VfB Stuttgart until 30 June 2018)

No.	Pos.	Nation	Player
—	FW	ANG	Gelson Dala (at Rio Ave until 30 June 2018)
—	FW	CPV	Héldon (at Vitória de Guimarães until 30 June 2018)
—	FW	POR	Iuri Medeiros (at Genoa until 30 June 2018)
—	FW	COL	Leonardo Ruiz (at Boavista until 30 June 2018)
—	FW	NED	Luc Castaignos (at Vitesse until 30 June 2018)
—	FW	LTU	Lukas Spalvis (at 1. FC Kaiserslautern until 30 June 2018)
—	FW	BRA	Matheus Pereira (at Chaves until 30 June 2018)
—	FW	ARG	Alan Ruiz (at Colón until 31 December 2018)

=== Transfers ===
==== Transfers in ====
No.	Pos.	Nat.	Name	Age	Moving from	Type	Transfer window	Ends	Transfer fee	Source
6	CB	(Portugal)	André Pinto	27	Braga	Transfer	Summer	2021	Free	
92	RB	(Italy)	Cristiano Piccini	24	Real Betis	Transfer	Summer	2022	€3.2 m	
21	AM	(Brazil)	Mattheus Oliveira	24	Estoril	Transfer	Summer	2022	€2.0 m	
16	CM	(Argentina)	Rodrigo Battaglia	25	Braga	Transfer	Summer	2022	€4.5 m	
8	MF	(Portugal)	Bruno Fernandes	22	Sampdoria	Transfer	Summer	2022	€8.5 m	
88	FW	(Ivory Coast)	Seydou Doumbia	29	Roma	Transfer	Summer	2018	€3.5 m	
5	LB	(Portugal)	Fábio Coentrão	29	Real Madrid	Loan	Summer	2018	Undisclosed	
22	CB	(France)	Jérémy Mathieu	33	Barcelona	Transfer	Summer	2019	Free	
9	LW	(Argentina)	Marcos Acuña	25	Racing Club	Transfer	Summer	2021	€9.6 m	
18	GK	(France)	Romain Salin	33	Guingamp	Transfer	Summer	2019	Undisclosed	
13	RB	(North Macedonia)	Stefan Ristovski	25	Rijeka	Loan	Summer	2018	Undisclosed	
82	GK	(Portugal)	Pedro Silva	20	Sporting CP B		Summer	2022	Youth system	

==== Transfers out ====
No.	Pos.	Nat.	Name	Age	Moving to	Type	Transfer window	Transfer fee	Source
	DF	(Portugal)	Rúben Semedo	23	Villarreal	Transfer	Summer	€14.0 m	
	DF	(Portugal)	Filipe Chaby	25	Belenenses	Transfer	Summer	Undisclosed	
	DF	(Portugal)	Ricardo Esgaio	24	Braga	Transfer	Summer	Free	
	DF	(Portugal)	Paulo Oliveira	25	Eibar	Transfer	Summer	€3.5 m	
	DF	(Portugal)	André Geraldes	21	Desportivo das Aves	Loan	Summer	Free	
	DF	(Guinea)	Mama Baldé	21	Belenenses	Loan	Summer	Free	
	DF	(Portugal)	Domingos Duarte	22	Chaves	Loan	Summer	Free	
	DF	(Brazil)	Jefferson	28	Braga	Loan	Summer	Free	
	MF	(Portugal)	Francisco Geraldes	22	Rio Ave	Loan	Summer	Free	
	MF	(Scotland)	Ryan Gauld	21	Desportivo das Aves	Loan	Summer	Free	
	MF	(Bulgaria)	Simeon Slavchev	23	Lechia Gdańsk	Loan	Summer	Undisclosed	
	FW	(Cape Verde)	Héldon	28	Vitória de Guimarães	Loan	Summer	Free	
	FW	(Brazil)	Matheus Pereira	21	Chaves	Loan	Summer	Free	
	FW	(Netherlands)	Luc Castaignos	24	Vitesse	Loan	Summer	Free	
	FW	(Colombia)	Leonardo Ruiz	21	Boavista	Loan	Summer	Free	
	FW	(Lithuania)	Lukas Spalvis	22	1. FC Kaiserslautern	Loan	Summer	Free	

== Pre-season and friendlies ==
Win Draw Loss

5 July 2017 Friendly	Sporting CP (Portugal)	2–0	(Portugal) Cova da Piedade	Alcochete, Portugal
17:00 WEST (UTC+01:00)	Dost; Pereira	Report		Stadium: Academia Sporting

7 July 2017 Friendly	Sporting CP (Portugal)	1–1	(Portugal) Belenenses	Faro, Portugal
20:00 WEST (UTC+01:00)	Acevedo 62'		Sousa 62'	Stadium: Estádio Algarve; Referee: João Capela (Portugal)

12 July 2017 Friendly	Sporting CP (Portugal)	2–1	(Turkey) Fenerbahçe	Rennes, Switzerland
20:30 CEST (UTC+02:00)	Dost 32'; Doumbia 75'			Stadium: Stade du Censuy

13 July 2017 Friendly	Sporting CP (Portugal)	0–3	(Spain) Valencia	Martigny, Switzerland
20:30 CEST (UTC+02:00)			Orellana 23'; Rodrigo 28'; Gil 68'

15 July 2017 Friendly	Basel (Switzerland)	3–2	(Portugal) Sporting CP	Estavayer-le-lac, Switzerland
19:15 CEST (UTC+02:00)	Delgado 34' (pen.); Steffen 43'; Bua 80'		Dost 28' (pen.); Pereira 78'	Stadium: Terrain des Grèves, Centre Sportif, Delley-Portalban; Attendance: 3,500; Referee: (Switzerland) Alain Bieri (Solothurn)

18 July 2017 Friendly	Marseille (France)	2–1	(Portugal) Sporting CP	Evian-les-Bains, France
19:30 CEST (UTC+02:00)	N'Jie 2', 50'		Doumbia 71' (pen.)	Stadium: Camille Fournier

22 July 2017 Presentation	Sporting CP (Portugal)	2–1	(France) Monaco	Lisbon, Portugal
19:30 WEST (UTC+01:00)	Fernandes 32'; Dost 43'		Carrillo 90+1'	Stadium: Estádio José Alvalade; Attendance: 40,488; Referee: Artur Soares Dias (Portugal)

26 July 2017 Friendly	Sporting CP (Portugal)	0–3	(Portugal) Vitória de Guimarães	Rio Maior, Portugal
20:00 WEST (UTC+01:00)			Estupiñán 14', 22'; Raphinha 85'	Stadium: Estádio Municipal de Rio Maior; Referee: Artur Soares Dias (Portugal)

29 July 2017 Troféu Cinco Violinos	Sporting CP (Portugal)	1–0	(Italy) Fiorentina	Lisbon, Portugal
18:00 WEST (UTC+01:00)	Dost 29'			Stadium: Estádio José Alvalade; Attendance: 37,775; Referee: João Pinheiro (Portugal)

== Competitions ==
=== Overview ===
Competition	First match	Last match	Starting round	Final position	Record							
Competition	First match	Last match	Starting round	Final position	Pld	W	D	L	GF	GA	GD	Win %
Primeira Liga	6 August 2017	13 May 2018	Matchday 1	3rd	34	24	6	4	63	24	+39	70.59
Taça de Portugal	12 October 2017	20 May 2018	3rd round	Runners-up	7	5	0	2	14	6	+8	71.43
Taça da Liga	19 September 2017	27 January 2018	Group stage	Winners	5	3	2	0	8	2	+6	60.00
Champions League	15 August 2017	5 December 2017	Play-off round	Group stage	8	3	2	3	13	10	+3	37.50
Europa League	15 February 2018	12 April 2018	Round of 32	Quarter-finals	6	3	1	2	10	8	+2	50.00
Total					60	38	11	11	108	50	+58	63.33

Source: Sporting.pt

=== Primeira Liga ===
On 5 July 2017, Liga Portuguesa de Futebol Profissional announced nine stipulations for the Liga NOS fixture draw that took place on 7 July. Among previous conditions, two new were added, the two teams who will play the Supertaça could not play against Sporting CP (Portuguese team in the play-off round of Champions League) on the first two matchdays.

==== League table ====
Pos	Team	Pld	W	D	L	GF	GA	GD	Pts	Qualification or relegation
1	Porto (C)	34	28	4	2	82	18	+64	88	Qualification for the Champions League group stage
2	Benfica	34	25	6	3	80	22	+58	81	Qualification for the Champions League third qualifying round
3	Sporting CP	34	24	6	4	63	24	+39	78	Qualification for the Europa League group stage (Note: Desportivo das Aves qualified for the Europa league group stage by winning the 2017–18 Taça de Portugal. However, since they failed to obtain a license for European competitions, the spot awarded to the cup winners (Europa League group stage) was passed to the third-placed team, the spot awarded to the third-placed team (Europa League third qualifying round) was passed to the fourth-placed team, and the spot awarded to the fourth-placed team was passed to the fifth-placed team (Europa league second qualifying round).)
4	Braga	34	24	3	7	74	29	+45	75	Qualification for the Europa League third qualifying round
5	Rio Ave	34	15	6	13	40	42	−2	51	Qualification for the Europa League second qualifying round

Source: Liga Portugal
Rules for classification: 1) Points; 2) Head-to-head points; 3) Head-to-head goal difference; 4) Head-to-head away goals scored; 5) Goal difference; 6) Matches won; 7) Goals scored; 8) Play-off. (Note: only criteria 1, 5, 6 and 7 are applied to establish the classification during the competition.)
(C) Champions

==== Results by round ====
Round	1	2	3	4	5	6	7	8	9	10	11	12	13	14	15	16	17	18	19	20	21	22	23	24	25	26	27	28	29	30	31	32	33	34
Ground	A	H	A	H	A	H	A	H	H	A	H	A	H	A	H	A	H	H	A	H	A	H	A	H	A	A	H	A	H	A	H	A	H	A
Result	W	W	W	W	W	W	D	D	W	W	D	W	W	W	W	D	W	W	D	W	L	W	W	W	L	W	W	L	W	W	W	W	D	L
Position	3	3	2	1	2	2	2	2	2	2	2	2	2	2	2	2	2	2	2	2	3	3	3	3	3	3	3	3	3	3	3	3	3	3

Updated to match(es) played on 6 May 2018. Source: [[[Category:All articles with unsourced statements]]
A = Away; H = Home; W = Win; D = Draw; L = Loss

Tied with FC Porto at matchday 3.

==== Matches ====
6 August 2017 1	Desportivo das Aves	0–2	Sporting CP	Vila das Aves
18:00 WEST (UTC+01:00)			Martins 23', 75'	Stadium: Estádio do CD Aves; Attendance: 5,462; Referee: Tiago Martins

11 August 2017 2	Sporting CP	1–0	Vitória de Setúbal	Lisbon
20:30 WEST (UTC+01:00)	Dost 86' (pen.)			Stadium: Estádio José Alvalade; Attendance: 42,415; Referee: Bruno Paixão

19 August 2017 3	Vitória de Guimarães	0–5	Sporting CP	Guimarães
18:15 WEST (UTC+01:00)			Fernandes 3', 60'; Dost 21', 23'; A. Silva 85'	Stadium: Estádio D. Afonso Henriques; Attendance: 22,936; Referee: Hugo Miguel

27 August 2017 4	Sporting CP	2–1	Estoril	Lisbon
18:00 WEST (UTC+01:00)	Martins 4'; Fernandes 11'		Lucas Evangelista 85'	Stadium: Estádio José Alvalade; Attendance: 45,367; Referee: Luís Godinho

10 September 2017 5	Feirense	2–3	Sporting CP	Santa Maria da Feira
19:00 WEST (UTC+01:00)	J. Silva 69'; Etebo 80'		Coates 62'; Fernandes 64'; Dost 90+8' (pen.)	Stadium: Estádio Marcolino de Castro; Attendance: 5,449; Referee: Artur Soares Dias

16 September 2017 6	Sporting CP	2–0	Tondela	Lisbon
20:30 WEST (UTC+01:00)	Mathieu 12'; Fernandes 72'	Report		Stadium: Estádio José Alvalade; Attendance: 42,401; Referee: Manuel Oliveira

23 September 2017 7	Moreirense	1–1	Sporting CP	Moreira de Cónegos
18:15 WEST (UTC+01:00)	Costa 43'	Report	Abarhoun 62' (o.g.)	Stadium: Parque de Jogos Comendador Joaquim de Almeida Freitas; Attendance: 3,976; Referee: Luís Godinho

1 October 2017 8	Sporting CP	0–0	Porto	Lisbon
19:15 WEST (UTC+01:00)		Report		Stadium: Estádio José Alvalade; Attendance: 47,017; Referee: Carlos Xistra

22 October 2017 9	Sporting CP	5–1	Chaves	Lisbon
20:15 WEST (UTC+01:00)	Dost 6', 15', 75'; Acuña 39', 58'	Report	Davidson 90+2'	Stadium: Estádio José Alvalade; Attendance: 42,285; Referee: Rui Costa

27 October 2017 10	Rio Ave	0–1	Sporting CP	Vila do Conde
20:30 WEST (UTC+01:00)		Report	Dost 85'	Stadium: Estádio dos Arcos; Attendance: 7,158; Referee: Rui Costa

5 November 2017 11	Sporting CP	2–2	Braga	Lisbon
20:15 GMT (UTC+00:00)	Dost 66'; Fernandes 90+5'	Report	Sousa 85'; Danilo 89'	Stadium: Estádio José Alvalade; Attendance: 42,884; Referee: Carlos Xistra

26 November 2017 12	Paços de Ferreira	1–2	Sporting CP	Paços de Ferreira
18:00 GMT (UTC+00:00)	Baixinho 90'	Report	Battaglia 20'; Martins 74'	Stadium: Estádio Capital do Móvel; Attendance: 5,534; Referee: Tiago Martins

1 December 2017 13	Sporting CP	1–0	Belenenses	Lisbon
18:15 GMT (UTC+00:00)	Dost 13' (pen.)	Report		Stadium: Estádio José Alvalade; Attendance: 46,881; Referee: Nuno Almeida

9 December 2017 14	Boavista	1–3	Sporting CP	Porto
20:15 GMT (UTC+00:00)	Mateus 65'	Report	Coentrão 45+3'; Dost 63', 67'	Stadium: Estádio do Bessa; Attendance: 8,271; Referee: Luís Godinho

17 December 2017 15	Sporting CP	2–0	Portimonense	Lisbon
18:00 GMT (UTC+00:00)	Fernandes 9'; Dost 60'	Report		Stadium: Estádio José Alvalade; Attendance: 43,797; Referee: João Capela

3 January 2018 16	Benfica	1–1	Sporting CP	Lisbon
21:30 GMT (UTC+00:00)	Jonas 90'	Report	Martins 18'	Stadium: Estádio da Luz; Attendance: 61,996; Referee: Hugo Miguel

7 January 2018 17	Sporting CP	5–0	Marítimo	Lisbon
18:00 GMT (UTC+00:00)	Dost 20', 72', 78'; Ruiz 50'; Acuña 90+1'	Report		Stadium: Estádio José Alvalade; Attendance: 41,754; Referee: Carlos Xistra

14 January 2018 18	Sporting CP	3–0	Desportivo das Aves	Lisbon
20:15 GMT (UTC+00:00)	Dost 31', 52', 90'	Report		Stadium: Estádio José Alvalade; Attendance: 41,950; Referee: João Pinheiro

19 January 2018 19	Vitória de Setúbal	1–1	Sporting CP	Setúbal
19:00 GMT (UTC+00:00)	Edinho 90+3' (pen.)	Report	Fernandes 31'	Stadium: Estádio do Bonfim; Attendance: 7,540; Referee: Fábio Veríssimo

31 January 2018 20	Sporting CP	1–0	Vitória de Guimarães	Lisbon
21:00 GMT (UTC+00:00)	Mathieu 83'	Report		Stadium: Estádio José Alvalade; Attendance: 42,757; Referee: Luís Godinho

4 February 2018 21	Estoril	2–0	Sporting CP	Estoril
18:00 GMT (UTC+00:00)	Kyriakou 27'; Ewandro 31'	Report		Stadium: Estádio António Coimbra da Mota; Attendance: 6,258; Referee: Manuel Mota

11 February 2018 22	Sporting CP	2–0	Feirense	Lisbon
18:00 GMT (UTC+00:00)	Carvalho 79'; Montero 90'	Report		Stadium: Estádio José Alvalade; Attendance: 41,978; Referee: Luís Ferreira

19 February 2018 23	Tondela	1–2	Sporting CP	Tondela
20:00 GMT (UTC+00:00)	Cardoso 13'	Report	Dost 26'; Coates 90+8'	Stadium: Estádio João Cardoso; Attendance: 4,885; Referee: João Capela

26 February 2018 24	Sporting CP	1–0	Moreirense	Lisbon
21:00 GMT (UTC+00:00)	Martins 90+2'	Report		Stadium: Estádio José Alvalade; Attendance: 38,920; Referee: Tiago Martins

2 March 2018 25	Porto	2–1	Sporting CP	Porto
20:30 GMT (UTC+00:00)	Marcano 29'; Brahimi 49'	Report	Leão 45+1'	Stadium: Estádio do Dragão; Attendance: 48,405; Referee: Artur Soares Dias

12 March 2018 26	Chaves	1–2	Sporting CP	Chaves
19:00 GMT (UTC+00:00)	Platiny 90+1'	Report	Dost 62', 86'	Stadium: Estádio Municipal de Chaves; Attendance: 3,208; Referee: Hugo Miguel

18 March 2018 27	Sporting CP	2–0	Rio Ave	Lisbon
20:15 GMT (UTC+00:00)	Martins 23'; Dost 83'	Report		Stadium: Estádio José Alvalade; Attendance: 42,706; Referee: Rui Costa

31 March 2018 28	Braga	1–0	Sporting CP	Braga
20:30 WEST (UTC+01:00)	Silva 87'	Report		Stadium: Estádio Municipal de Braga; Attendance: 16,557; Referee: Luís Godinho

8 April 2018 29	Sporting CP	2–0	Paços de Ferreira	Lisbon
20:15 WEST (UTC+01:00)	Dost 19'; Ruiz 65'	Report		Stadium: Estádio José Alvalade; Attendance: 40,868; Referee: Bruno Esteves

15 April 2018 30	Belenenses	3–4	Sporting CP	Lisbon
20:15 WEST (UTC+01:00)	Yebda 6' (pen.); Licá 66'; Fredy 66' (pen.)	Report	Dost 13'; Martins 16'; Acuña 43'; Fernandes 80' (pen.)	Stadium: Estádio do Restelo; Attendance: 5,167; Referee: Bruno Paixão

22 April 2018 31	Sporting CP	1–0	Boavista	Lisbon
20:15 WEST (UTC+01:00)	Dost 26' (pen.)	Report		Stadium: Estádio José Alvalade; Attendance: 48,320; Referee: Fábio Veríssimo

28 April 2018 32	Portimonense	1–2	Sporting CP	Portimão
20:30 WEST (UTC+01:00)	Fabrício 42'	Report	Fernandes 23', 89'	Stadium: Estádio Municipal de Portimão; Attendance: 5,724; Referee: Manuel Oliveira

5 May 2018 33	Sporting CP	0–0	Benfica	Lisbon
20:30 WEST (UTC+01:00)		Report		Stadium: Estádio José Alvalade; Attendance: 49,339; Referee: Carlos Xistra

13 May 2018 34	Marítimo	2–1	Sporting CP	Funchal
				Stadium: Estádio do Marítimo

=== Taça de Portugal ===
==== Third round ====
12 October 2017	Oleiros	2–4	Sporting CP	Oleiros
20:15 WEST (UTC+01:00)	Jackson 80'; Djô Djô 90+3'		Palhinha 23', 62'; Oliveira 41'; Leão 86'	Stadium: Estádio Municipal de Oleiros; Attendance: 2,241

==== Fourth round ====
16 November 2017	Sporting CP	2–0	Famalicão	Lisbon
20:30 GMT (UTC+00:00)	Coates 65'; Dost 81'			Stadium: Estádio José Alvalade; Attendance: 11,683; Referee: Hélder Malheiro

==== Round of 16 ====
13 December 2017	Sporting CP	4–0	Vilaverdense	Lisbon
19:00 WET (UTC±00:00)	Doumbia 45', 64', 74'; Martins 88'			Stadium: Estádio José Alvalade; Referee: Luís Ferreira

==== Quarter-finals ====
10 January 2018	Cova da Piedade	1–2	Sporting CP	Setúbal
20:30 WET (UTC±00:00)	Cléo 58' (pen.)		Fernandes 54'; Dost 77'	Stadium: Estádio do Bonfim; Referee: Rui Costa

==== Semi-finals ====
7 February 2018 1st leg	Porto	1–0	Sporting CP	Porto
20:15 GMT (UTC±00:00)	Soares 60'			Stadium: Estádio do Dragão; Attendance: 32,855; Referee: João Pinheiro

18 April 2018 2nd leg	Sporting CP	1–0 (1–1 agg.) (5–4 p)	Porto	Lisbon
20:30 WEST (UTC+01:00)	Coates 85'			Stadium: Estádio José Alvalade; Attendance: 40,000; Referee: Jorge Sousa
	Penalties
	Fernandes (penalty scored); Ruiz (penalty scored); Mathieu (penalty scored); Coates (penalty scored); Montero (penalty scored)		(penalty missed) Marcano; (penalty scored) Telles; (penalty scored) Felipe; (penalty scored) Reyes; (penalty scored) Oliveira

1–1 on aggregate. Sporting CP won 5–4 on penalties.

==== Final ====
20 May 2018 Final	Sporting CP	1–2	Desportivo das Aves	Lisbon
17:15 WEST (UTC+01:00)	Montero 85'		Guedes 16', 72'	Stadium: Estádio do Jamor; Referee: Tiago Martins

=== Taça da Liga ===
==== Group stage ====
Pos	Team	Pld	W	D	L	GF	GA	GD	Pts	Qualification
1	Sporting CP	3	1	2	0	7	1	+6	5	Advance to knockout phase
2	Marítimo	3	1	2	0	3	2	+1	5	
3	Belenenses	3	0	3	0	2	2	0	3	
4	União da Madeira	3	0	1	2	3	10	−7	1	

Updated to match(es) played on 30 December 2017. Source:
Rules for classification: Tiebreakers

19 September 2017 1	Sporting CP	0–0	Marítimo	Lisbon
20:15 WEST (UTC+01:00)		Report		Stadium: Estádio José Alvalade; Attendance: 22,127; Referee: Manuel Mota

20 December 2017 2	Sporting CP	6–0	União da Madeira	Lisbon
21:15 WEST (UTC+00:00)	Doumbia 20', 61'; Mathieu 51'; Martins 67'; Coates 79'; Medeiros 81'	Report		Stadium: Estádio José Alvalade; Attendance: 8,713; Referee: Vasco Santos

29 December 2017 3	Belenenses	1–1	Sporting CP	Lisbon
19:15 WEST (UTC+00:00)	Coates 76' (o.g.)		Acuña 74'	Stadium: Estádio do Restelo; Attendance: 6,897; Referee: João Pinheiro

==== Semi-finals ====
24 January 2018	Sporting CP	0–0 (4–3 p)	Porto	Braga
20:45 WEST (UTC+00:00)		Report		Stadium: Estádio Municipal de Braga; Attendance: 26,536; Referee: Nuno Almeida
	Penalties
	Dost (penalty scored); Fernandes (penalty scored); Mathieu (penalty scored); Coates (penalty missed); Carvalho (penalty missed); Ruiz (penalty scored)		(penalty scored) Telles; (penalty scored) Marcano; (penalty missed) Herrera; (penalty scored) Waris; (penalty missed) Aboubakar; (penalty missed) Brahimi

==== Final ====
27 January 2018	Vitória Setúbal	1–1 (4–5 p)	Sporting CP	Braga
20:45 WEST (UTC+00:00)	Paciência 4'	Report	Dost 80' (pen.)	Stadium: Estádio Municipal de Braga; Attendance: 24,137; Referee: Rui Costa
	Penalties
	Paciência (penalty scored); Patrick (penalty scored); Podstawski (penalty missed); Edinho (penalty scored); Arnold (penalty scored)		(penalty scored) Dost; (penalty scored) Fernandes; (penalty scored) Mathieu; (penalty scored) Coates; (penalty scored) Carvalho

=== UEFA Champions League ===
==== Play-off round ====
15 August 2017 1st leg	Sporting CP (Portugal)	0–0	(Romania) Steaua București	Lisbon, Portugal
20:45 CEST (UTC+02:00)		Report		Stadium: Estádio José Alvalade; Attendance: 46,678; Referee: Felix Brych (Germany)

23 August 2017 2nd leg	Steaua București (Romania)	1–5 (1–5 agg.)	(Portugal) Sporting CP	Bucharest, Romania
20:45 CEST (UTC+02:00)	Morais 20'	Report	Doumbia 13'; Acuña 60'; Martins 64'; Dost 75'; Battaglia 88'	Stadium: Arena Națională; Attendance: 49,220; Referee: Cüneyt Çakır (Turkey)

==== Group stage ====
Pos	Team	Pld	W	D	L	GF	GA	GD	Pts	Qualification	BAR	JUV	SPO	OLY
1	(Spain) Barcelona	6	4	2	0	9	1	+8	14	Advance to knockout phase	—	3–0	2–0	3–1
2	(Italy) Juventus	6	3	2	1	7	5	+2	11	Advance to knockout phase	0–0	—	2–1	2–0
3	(Portugal) Sporting CP	6	2	1	3	8	9	−1	7	Transfer to Europa League	0–1	1–1	—	3–1
4	(Greece) Olympiacos	6	0	1	5	4	13	−9	1		0–0	0–2	2–3	—

Source: UEFA
Rules for classification: Group stage tiebreakers

12 September 2017 1	Olympiacos (Greece)	2–3	(Portugal) Sporting CP	Piraeus, Greece
20:45 CEST (UTC+02:00)	Pardo 89', 90+3'	Report	Doumbia 2'; Martins 13'; Fernandes 43'	Stadium: Karaiskakis Stadium; Attendance: 30,168; Referee: Viktor Kassai (Hungary)

27 September 2017 2	Sporting CP (Portugal)	0–1	(Spain) Barcelona	Lisbon, Portugal
20:45 CEST (UTC+02:00)		Report	Coates 49' (o.g.)	Stadium: Estádio José Alvalade; Attendance: 48,575; Referee: Ovidiu Hațegan (Romania)

18 October 2017 3	Juventus (Italy)	2–1	(Portugal) Sporting CP	Turin, Italy
20:45 CEST (UTC+02:00)	Pjanić 29'; Mandžukić 84'	Report	Alex Sandro 12' (o.g.)	Stadium: Juventus Stadium; Attendance: 36,288; Referee: Michael Oliver (England)

31 October 2017 4	Sporting CP (Portugal)	1–1	(Italy) Juventus	Lisbon, Portugal
20:45 CET (UTC+01:00)	Bruno César 20'	Report	Higuaín 79'	Stadium: Estádio José Alvalade; Attendance: 48,442; Referee: Clément Turpin (France)

22 November 2017 5	Sporting CP (Portugal)	3–1	(Greece) Olympiacos	Lisbon, Portugal
20:45 CET (UTC+01:00)	Dost 40', 66'; Bruno César 43'	Report	Odjidja-Ofoe 86'	Stadium: Estádio José Alvalade; Attendance: 42,528; Referee: Felix Zwayer (Germany)

5 December 2017 6	Barcelona (Spain)	2–0	(Portugal) Sporting CP	Barcelona, Spain
20:45 CET (UTC+01:00)	Alcácer 59'; Mathieu 90+1' (o.g.)	Report		Stadium: Camp Nou; Attendance: 48,336; Referee: Craig Thomson (Scotland)

=== UEFA Europa League ===
==== Round of 32 ====
15 February 2018 1st leg	Astana (Kazakhstan)	1–3	(Portugal) Sporting CP	Astana, Kazakhstan
17:00 CET (UTC+01:00)	Tomasov 7'	Report	Fernandes 48'; Martins 50'; Doumbia 56'	Stadium: Astana Arena; Attendance: 29,737; Referee: Ruddy Buquet (France)

22 February 2018 2nd leg	Sporting CP (Portugal)	3–3 (6–4 agg.)	(Kazakhstan) Astana	Lisbon, Portugal
19:00 CET (UTC+01:00)	Dost 3'; Fernandes 53', 63'	Report	Tomasov 37'; Twumasi 80'; Shomko 90+4'	Stadium: Estádio José Alvalade; Attendance: 30,456; Referee: Tamás Bognar (Hungary)

==== Round of 16 ====
8 March 2018 1st leg	Sporting CP (Portugal)	2–0	(Czech Republic) Viktoria Plzeň	Lisbon, Portugal
21:05 CET (UTC+01:00)	Montero 45+1', 49'	Report		Stadium: Estádio José Alvalade; Attendance: 26,090; Referee: Aleksei Kulbakov (Belarus)

16 March 2018 2nd leg	Viktoria Plzeň (Czech Republic)	2–1 (2–3 agg.)	(Portugal) Sporting CP	Plzeň, Czech Republic
19:00 CET (UTC+01:00)	Bakoš 6', 65'	Report	Battaglia 105+1'	Stadium: Doosan Arena; Attendance: 9,370; Referee: Tobias Stieler (Germany)

==== Quarter-finals ====
5 April 2018 1st Leg	Atlético Madrid (Spain)	2–0	(Portugal) Sporting CP	Madrid, Spain
20:05 WEST (UTC+01:00)	Koke 1'; Griezmann 40'	Report		Stadium: Wanda Metropolitano; Referee: Sergei Karasev (Russia)

12 April 2018 2nd leg	Sporting CP (Portugal)	1–0 (1–2 agg.)	(Spain) Atlético Madrid	Lisbon, Portugal
21:05 CET (UTC+01:00)	Montero 28'	Report		Stadium: Estádio José Alvalade; Attendance: 28,437; Referee: Milorad Mažić (Serbia)

== Statistics ==
=== Appearances and goals ===
Last updated on 18 May 2019

No.	Pos	Nat	Player	Total		Primeira Liga		Taça de Portugal		Taça da Liga		UEFA Champions League		UEFA Europa League	
No.	Pos	Nat	Player	Apps	Goals	Apps	Goals	Apps	Goals	Apps	Goals	Apps	Goals	Apps	Goals
Goalkeepers
1	GK	(Portugal) POR	Rui Patrício	42	0	34	0	5	0	3	0	0	0	0	0
19	GK	(France) FRA	Romain Salin	3	0	0	0	1	0	2	0	0	0	0	0
82	GK	(Portugal) POR	Pedro Silva	0	0	0	0	0	0	0	0	0	0	0	0
Defenders
4	DF	(Uruguay) URU	Sebastián Coates	43	5	34	2	5	2	4	1	0	0	0	0
5	DF	(Portugal) POR	Fábio Coentrão	33	1	25	1	5	0	3	0	0	0	0	0
6	DF	(Portugal) POR	André Pinto	10	0	4+3	0	2	0	1	0	0	0	0	0
13	DF	(North Macedonia) MKD	Stefan Ristovski	15	0	8	0	5+1	0	1	0	0	0	0	0
15	DF	(Ghana) GHA	Lumor Agbenyenu	7	0	0+7	0	0	0	0	0	0	0	0	0
19	DF	(Netherlands) NED	Douglas	0	0	0	0	0	0	0	0	0	0	0	0
22	DF	(France) FRA	Jérémy Mathieu	36	3	29	2	3	0	4	1	0	0	0	0
92	DF	(Italy) ITA	Cristiano Piccini	30	0	24	0	2	0	4	0	0	0	0	0
Midfielders
8	MF	(Portugal) POR	Bruno Fernandes	42	12	32+1	11	3+2	1	3+1	0	0	0	0	0
11	MF	(Brazil) BRA	Bruno César	25	0	7+11	0	3+1	0	2+1	0	0	0	0	0
14	MF	(Portugal) POR	William Carvalho	29	1	24	1	1	0	4	0	0	0	0	0
16	MF	(Argentina) ARG	Rodrigo Battaglia	43	1	21+12	1	6	0	1+3	0	0	0	0	0
25	MF	(Serbia) SRB	Radosav Petrović	8	0	2+3	0	2	0	1	0	0	0	0	0
27	MF	(Croatia) CRO	Josip Mišić	6	0	1+4	0	0+1	0	0	0	0	0	0	0
37	MF	(Brazil) BRA	Wendel	4	0	1+3	0	0	0	0	0	0	0	0	0
66	MF	(Portugal) POR	João Palhinha	3	0	0+2	0	0+1	0	0	0	0	0	0	0
Forwards
7	FW	(Portugal) POR	Rúben Ribeiro	12	0	5+4	0	0+1	0	2	0	0	0	0	0
9	FW	(Argentina) ARG	Marcos Acuña	41	5	27+4	4	4+1	0	3+2	1	0	0	0	0
17	FW	(Portugal) POR	Daniel Podence	18	0	7+5	0	2+1	0	2+1	0	0	0	0	0
20	FW	(Costa Rica) CRC	Bryan Ruiz	27	2	11+9	2	3	0	2+2	0	0	0	0	0
28	FW	(Netherlands) NED	Bas Dost	38	30	29+1	27	3+1	2	3+1	1	0	0	0	0
40	FW	(Colombia) COL	Fredy Montero	16	2	4+7	1	0+3	1	1+1	0	0	0	0	0
77	FW	(Portugal) POR	Gelson Martins	39	10	30+1	8	3+2	1	2+1	1	0	0	0	0
88	FW	(Ivory Coast) CIV	Seydou Doumbia	21	5	4+10	0	3+1	3	2+1	2	0	0	0	0
93	FW	(Portugal) POR	Rafael Leão	4	1	0+3	1	0	0	0	0	0	0	0+1	0
Players who have made an appearance or had a squad number this season but have been loaned out or transferred
3	DF	(Argentina) ARG	Jonathan Silva	12	0	4+2	0	1	0	1	0	2+2	0	0	0
55	DF	(Portugal) POR	Tobias Figueiredo	4	0	0	0	2	0	1	0	0+1	0	0	0
21	MF	(Brazil) BRA	Matheus Pereira	3	0	0	0	0+1	0	1	0	0	0	0+1	0
23	MF	(Portugal) POR	Adrien Silva	5	1	3	1	0	0	0	0	2	0	0	0
45	MF	(Portugal) POR	Iuri Medeiros	10	1	1+5	0	1	0	1+1	1	0+1	0	0	0
10	FW	(Argentina) ARG	Alan Ruiz	8	0	3+2	0	1	0	1	0	1	0	0	0

=== Clean sheets ===
No.	Player	Primeira Liga	Taça de Portugal	Taça da Liga	Champions League	Europa League	Total
1	(Portugal) Rui Patrício	17	2	1	1	2	24
18	(France) Romain Salin	0	1	2	0	0	3
Totals		17	3	3	1	2	27
