= Amadu Turé =

Bissau-Guinean footballer

Personal information
- Date of birth: 3 June 1993 (age 33)
- Place of birth: Bissau, Guinea-Bissau
- Height: 1.83 m (6 ft 0 in)
- Position: Forward

Team information
- Current team: Salgueiros

Youth career
- 2011–2012: Tourizense

Senior career*
| Years | Team | Apps | (Gls) |
| 2012–2013 | Oliveira do Hospital | 25 | (7) |
| 2013–2014 | Vila Flor | 31 | (6) |
| 2014–2015 | Alcanenense | 23 | (7) |
| 2015–2017 | Bragança | 62 | (29) |
| 2017–2018 | Sporting Covilhã | 14 | (1) |
| 2018 | Montalegre | 11 | (4) |
| 2019–2020 | Loures | 37 | (9) |
| 2020–2021 | Benfica de Castelo Branco | 26 | (5) |
| 2021– | Salgueiros | 3 | (2) |
- * Club domestic league appearances and goals as of 21 October 2021

Amadu Turé (born 3 June 1993) is a Guinea-Bissauan footballer who plays for Salgueiros as a forward.

== Football career ==
On 23 July 2017, Turé made his professional debut with Sporting Covilhã in a 2017–18 Taça da Liga match against União Madeira.
