= Seydou Doumbia =

Ivorian professional footballer (born 1987)

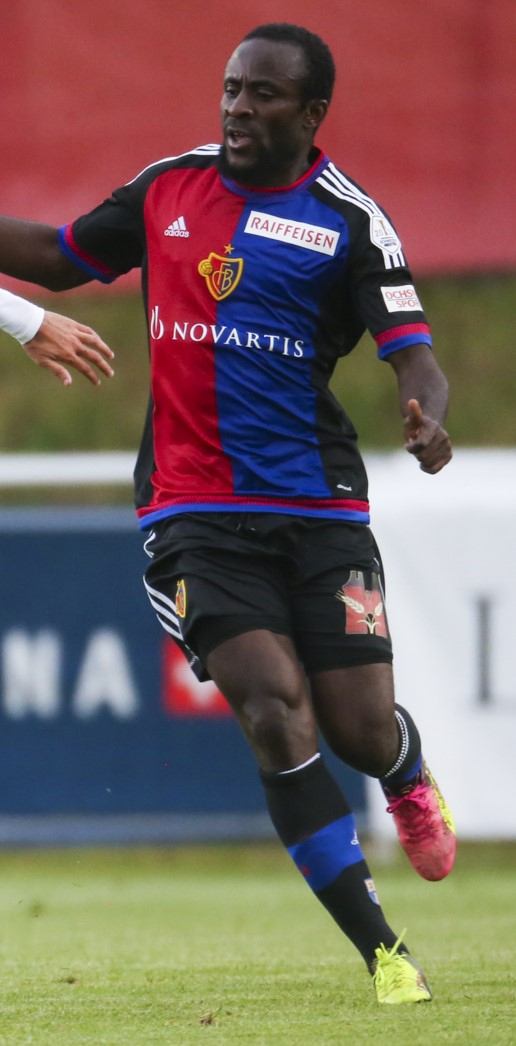
- Doumbia with Basel in 2016

Personal information
- Full name: Seydou Doumbia
- Date of birth: 31 December 1987 (age 38)
- Place of birth: Abidjan, Ivory Coast
- Height: 1.78 m (5 ft 10 in)
- Position: Forward

Youth career
- 1999–2003: Centre Formation d'Inter

Senior career*
Years	Team	Apps	(Gls)
2003–2006	Athlétic d'Adjamé	0	(0)
2004	→ Toumodi (loan)		
2004–2005	→ ASEC Mimosas (loan)	14	(11)
2005–2006	→ AS Denguélé (loan)	20	(15)
2006–2008	Kashiwa Reysol	24	(3)
2008	→ Tokushima Vortis (loan)	16	(7)
2008–2010	Young Boys	64	(50)
2010–2015	CSKA Moscow	95	(61)
2015–2018	Roma	13	(2)
2015–2016	→ CSKA Moscow (loan)	13	(5)
2016	→ Newcastle United (loan)	3	(0)
2016–2017	→ Basel (loan)	25	(20)
2017–2018	→ Sporting CP (loan)	14	(0)
2018–2019	Girona	17	(2)
2019–2020	Sion	15	(5)
2021	Ħamrun Spartans	5	(3)
Total		338	(184)

International career
2008–2017	Ivory Coast	37	(9)
Medal record
Representing Ivory Coast
Men's football
Africa Cup of Nations
Winner	2015 Guinea
Runner-up	2012 Eguatorial Guinea-Gabon
- * Club domestic league appearances and goals

Seydou Doumbia (French pronunciation: [sɛdu dumbja]; born 31 December 1987) is an Ivorian former professional footballer who played as a forward.

After beginning his career in the Ivory Coast and Japan, he arrived in Europe in 2008 to play for Swiss club Young Boys, where he was the top scorer and player of the year in the Swiss Super League in both of his seasons. In 2010, he signed for CSKA Moscow for a reported fee of €15 million, where he won several domestic honours and was twice the Russian Premier League's top scorer. He was transferred to Roma in 2015, and spent much of his tenure out on loan, including the 2016–17 season at Basel, where he won the league, Swiss Cup and was top scorer for a third time.

Doumbia made his international debut for the Ivory Coast in 2008. He was part of their squads at the 2010 FIFA World Cup and the Africa Cup of Nations in 2012 and 2015, winning the latter tournament.

== Club career ==
=== Early career ===
Doumbia started his career at the Inter FC youth academy and started playing at second division partner club AS Athlétic Adjamé in 2003. He joined second division team Toumodi on loan for the 2004–05 season, and was on loan in 2005 at AS Denguélé, where he became Côte d'Ivoire Premier Division top scorer with 15 goals. In 2006, he moved to Japan, where he played for Kashiwa Reysol and then Tokushima Vortis until 2008, when his contract expired.

=== Young Boys ===
In summer 2008, Doumbia signed with Swiss club Young Boys, before failing a trial at Rapid Bucharest. In the Swiss Super League, he scored 20 goals in his maiden season and 30 in the 2009–10 season, making him twice top goalscorer in the Swiss Championship.

On 30 July 2009, Doumbia scored the only goal of the game as he slotted the ball past goalkeeper Gorka Iraizoz to defeat Athletic Bilbao 1–0 in the first leg of their Europa League qualifying round tie at the San Mamés. Young Boys crashed out of the competition on away goals as they lost the second leg at home 2–1 on 6 August. In the club's run to their appearance in the 2009 Swiss Cup Final, Doumbia netted five goals, including a brace against Ibach and the only goal in their Round of 16 victory over Gossau.

Doumbia scored his first hat-trick for the club against Aarau on 4 October 2009, a 4–0 win, and netted another remarkable first-half hat-trick three weeks later in a 7–1 thrashing of Bellinzona on 29 October. On 13 February 2010, Doumbia proved vital in his club's 2–1 win against Lucerne as he netted two times in the first 17 minutes of the game. The Ivorian's final hat-trick in Swiss football came in a 4–0 thumping of Grasshopper on 20 March 2010. Doumbia's performances caught the eyes of other big clubs in Europe, and he left the club having scored fifty league goals in just 64 appearances.

=== CSKA Moscow ===
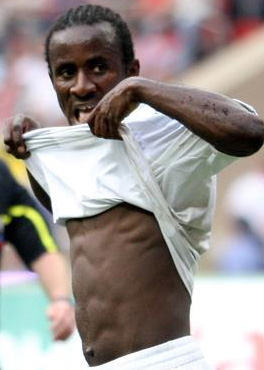
Seydou Doumbia with CSKA in 2010

On 5 January 2010, Russian club CSKA Moscow completed the transfer of Doumbia on a five-year deal, for a reported fee of €15 million. Under the terms of the contract, he would stay at Young Boys until the end of the season, before moving to Russia.

He made his debut in a 2–1 win over Spartak Moscow on 1 August 2010, thereby becoming the 200th CSKA player to appear in the Russian league.

On 19 August 2010, he scored his first goal for CSKA Moscow in the first leg of a Europa League playoff tie against Anorthosis Famagusta and added another goal seven minutes later. In the second leg, Doumbia leveled the score with 5 minutes to go and CSKA Moscow went on to win 2–1 (6–1 in aggregate). On 30 September, Doumbia scored goals either side of a Mark González penalty to earn his side a 3–0 victory over Sparta Prague to maintain the Russian's 100% record in Europa League Group F play. In the next matchday, the Army Men travelled to the Stadio Renzo Barbera, where Doumbia netted another brace in a 3–0 win over Palermo on 21 October.

Doumbia's first goal of the new league campaign came on 17 April 2011, in their third Premier League fixture when he latched on to a Tomáš Necid cross and pushed it by Rubin goalkeeper Sergey Ryzhikov; the away win pushed the Army Men up into first place in the table. In their Moscow derby against Dinamo on 8 May, Doumbia seemingly won the game with a strike in the 81st minute, until a defensive error let Marko Lomic equalize the game at 2–2 in the 90th minute. In the final of the Russian Cup on 22 May 2011, Doumbia netted two times as CSKA defeated second-tier side Alania Vladikavkaz 2–1.

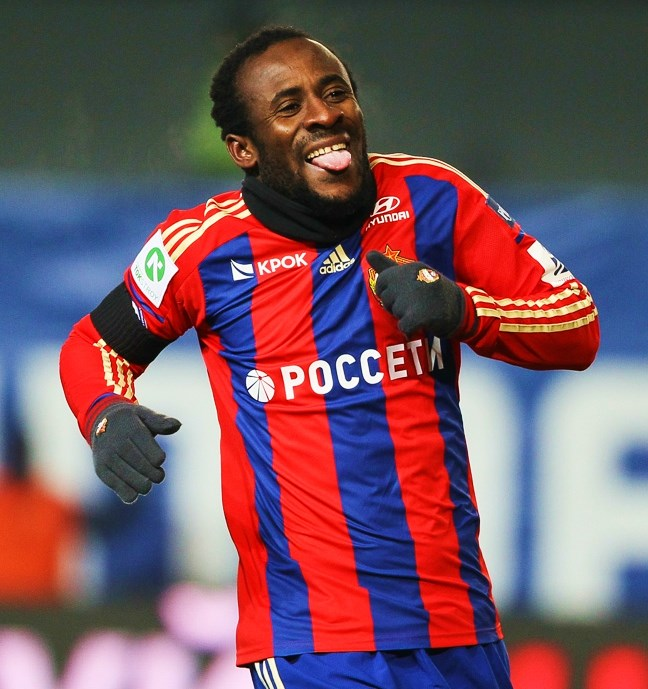
Seydou Doumbia in a match against FC Ufa, 2014

In CSKA's match against Tom Tomsk on 20 August 2011, Doumbia scored a second-half brace as the capital club eased to a 3–0 victory. On 14 September, he scored twice in the Champions League against Ligue 1 champions Lille, helping his side secure a 2–2 draw after falling behind 2–0. The Ivorian striker added two more goals as CSKA defeated Turkish side Trabzonspor 3–0 on 18 October, to record the Russians first victory in Group B play. Five days later, Doumbia scored two goals to power CSKA to victory in their enthralling 5–3 game against side Anzhi Makhachkala. In their following league game against Spartak Nalchik on 28 October, Doumbia scored a seven-minute hat-trick to earn his side a 4–0 win, after his teammate, Vagner Love, had put the hosts up 1–0 in the 34th minute. Doumbia opened the scoring against Internazionale on 7 December, guiding his side to a 2–1 away victory, which secured a berth in the Round of 16 against Spanish club Real Madrid. On 29 December, Doumbia was voted the Russian Premier League Player of the Year after netting 24 goals in 30 league games during the calendar year as well as five Champions League goals in as many games.

On 19 March 2012, Doumbia scored a goal against city rivals Spartak, earning his side a 2–1 victory. He scored his final goal of the league season from the penalty spot, as CSKA defeated local rivals Lokomotiv 3–0 on 2 May. Doumbia won the Golden Boot as he netted 23 goals in the initial league campaign, seven more than closest rival Alexandr Kerzhakov, and added five more goals in the Championship Group as well as providing 11 assists throughout the season.

Doumbia scored two first-half goals, the first of which was within two minutes of kick-off, as CSKA won 2–1 at Manchester City in the Champions League group stage on 5 November 2014.

=== Roma ===
On 31 January 2015, Doumbia joined Italian club Roma on a four-and-a-half-year deal for an initial fee of €14.4 million, rising to a potential €15.9 million. Doumbia scored twice in his thirteen appearances, in back-to-back games against Sassuolo and Genoa.

==== Loans to CSKA Moscow and Newcastle United ====
On 10 August 2015, Doumbia returned to CSKA Moscow on a season-long loan deal, following an unsuccessful spell with Roma.

On 1 February 2016, it was confirmed that Newcastle United had signed Doumbia on loan for the remainder of the 2015–16 season, with an option to make the deal permanent in the summer. The loan was unsuccessful, with Doumbia only making three appearances, all from the bench, and failing to score. Newcastle finished the season eighteenth and were relegated to the Championship.

==== Loan to Basel ====
On 28 June 2016, Basel announced that they had signed Doumbia on a one-year loan deal from A.S. Roma, with the option of a permanent deal at the end of the season. He joined Basel's first team for their 2016–17 season under head coach Urs Fischer. He made his domestic league debut on 24 July 2016, in a 3–0 home win at the St. Jakob-Park against Sion. He scored his first goal for his new club in the same game and just one week later on 31 July, during the away game against Vaduz, he scored his second. It was the last goal of the game and Basel won 5–1. Doumbia played in all six games that Basel had in the 2016–17 Champions League group stage scoring one goal. This was in the home in the St. Jakob-Park on 6 December 2016 in front of a sold out capacity ground of 36,000 spectators. But it could not help the team as they lost 4–1 against Arsenal. Under trainer Urs Fischer, Doumbia won the Swiss Super League championship at the end of the 2016–17 Super League season. This was the eighth title for the club in a row and their 20th championship title in total. They also won the Swiss Cup for the twelfth time, which meant they had won the double for the sixth time in the club's history.

Basel did not pull the option of a permanent transfer saying that the price was too high. During his time with the club Doumbia played a total of 33 games and scored 21 goals.

==== Loan to Sporting ====
On 30 June 2017, Doumbia went on his fourth consecutive loan since joining AS Roma, this time to Sporting CP. He made his debut for the Lisbon club on 11 August, replacing Daniel Podence for the final 25 minutes of a 1–0 home win over Vitória in the first game of the season. Doumbia played rarely for Sporting, as manager Jorge Jesus considered him incapable of partnering the prolific Dutchman Bas Dost up front.

Doumbia scored his first goal for the club on 23 August, opening a 5–1 win away to FC Steaua București in the Champions League play-off second leg (also aggregate score). On 13 December, in the last 16 of the Taça de Portugal, he scored a hat-trick as the Lions won 4–0 against third-tier Vilaverdense at the Estádio José Alvalade.

=== Later career ===
On 28 August 2018, Doumbia signed with La Liga side Girona for three years. On 16 January 2019, Doumbia scored a late goal in the Copa del Rey against Atlético Madrid at Metropolitano Stadium, which helped his club go through to the quarter finals on away goals after a 4–4 draw on aggregate. On 13 August of the following year, after suffering relegation, his contract was rescinded.

Doumbia returned to Switzerland's top flight on 2 September 2019, on a one-year deal with Sion. He and eight teammates were sacked on 20 March 2020 for refusing a pay cut during the coronavirus pandemic.

On 27 January 2021, Doumbia joined Maltese Premier League side Ħamrun Spartans on a six-month contract.

== International career ==
Doumbia earned his first international cap for Ivory Coast in a friendly against Japan during the Kirin Cup on 24 May 2008. He scored his first international goal in a friendly against Germany on 18 November 2009, in a 2–2 draw.

He was selected for Ivory Coast in the 2010 World Cup, but only made one appearance, as a 79th-minute substitute for Romaric, in the 3–0 win against North Korea.

Doumbia was selected for the Ivory Coast national team for the 2012 Africa Cup of Nations.

Doumbia announced his retirement from international competition after failing to make the Ivory Coast's squad for the 2014 FIFA World Cup, but was later called back by new coach Hervé Renard for the 2015 Africa Cup of Nations qualifiers and he returned to the national team.

At the 2015 Africa Cup of Nations finals, Doumbia scored les Éléphants' first goal of the tournament during their opening 1–1 draw with Guinea. He became 2015 Africa Cup of Nations champion with the Ivory Coast national football team.

== Personal life ==
Doumbia is the brother of the footballer Ousmane Doumbia.

== Career statistics ==
=== Club ===
Appearances and goals by club, season and competition
Club	Season	League			National cup (Note: Includes Emperor's Cup, Swiss Cup, Russian Cup, Taça de Portugal, Copa del Rey, Maltese FA Trophy)		League cup (Note: Includes J.League Cup, Taça da Liga)		Continental		Other		Total	
Club	Season	Division	Apps	Goals	Apps	Goals	Apps	Goals	Apps	Goals	Apps	Goals	Apps	Goals
Kashiwa Reysol	2006	J2 League	6	0	2	2	—		—		—		8	2
Kashiwa Reysol	2007	J1 League	18	3	0	0	5	1	—		—		23	4
Kashiwa Reysol	Total		24	3	2	2	5	1	—		—		31	6
Tokushima Vortis	2008	J2 League	16	7	0	0	—		—		—		16	7
Young Boys	2008–09	Swiss Super League	32	20	5	4	—		3 (Note: Appearances in UEFA Cup)	1	—		40	25
Young Boys	2009–10	Swiss Super League	32	30	4	1	—		2 (Note: Appearance(s) in UEFA Europa League)	1	—		38	32
Young Boys	Total		64	50	9	5	—		5	2	—		78	57
CSKA Moscow	2010	Russian Premier League	11	5	0	0	—		7	7	—		18	12
CSKA Moscow	2011–12	Russian Premier League	42	28	6	4	—		7 (Note: Appearances in UEFA Champions League)	5	1 (Note: Appearance in Russian Super Cup)	0	56	37
CSKA Moscow	2012–13	Russian Premier League	7	3	2	1	—		0	0	—		9	4
CSKA Moscow	2013–14	Russian Premier League	22	18	3	0	—		2	2	0	0	27	20
CSKA Moscow	2014–15	Russian Premier League	13	7	0	0	—		6	3	1	1	20	11
CSKA Moscow	Total		95	61	11	5	—		22	17	2	1	130	84
Roma	2014–15	Serie A	13	2	0	0	—		1	0	—		14	2
Roma	2015–16	Serie A	0	0	0	0	—		0	0	—		0	0
Roma	2016–17	Serie A	0	0	0	0	—		0	0	—		0	0
Roma	Total		13	2	0	0	—		1	0	—		14	2
CSKA Moscow (loan)	2015–16	Russian Premier League	13	5	0	0	—		8	6	—		21	11
Newcastle United (loan)	2015–16	Premier League	3	0	0	0	0	0	—		—		3	0
Basel (loan)	2016–17	Swiss Super League	25	20	2	0	—		6	1	—		33	21
Sporting (loan)	2017–18	Primeira Liga	14	0	4	3	3	2	8 (Note: Six appearances and two goals in UEFA Champions League, two appearances and one goal in UEFA Europa League)	3	—		29	8
Girona	2018–19	La Liga	17	2	5	1	—		—		—		22	3
Sion	2019–20	Swiss Super League	15	5	2	1	—		—		—		17	6
Ħamrun Spartan	2020–21	Maltese Premier League	5	3	1	1	—		—		—		6	4
Career total			304	158	36	18	8	3	50	29	2	1	400	209

=== International ===
Appearances and goals by national team and year
National team	Year	Apps	Goals
Ivory Coast
Ivory Coast	2008	1	0
Ivory Coast	2009	3	1
Ivory Coast	2010	6	0
Ivory Coast	2011	3	0
Ivory Coast	2012	6	1
Ivory Coast	2013	1	0
Ivory Coast	2014	3	1
Ivory Coast	2015	11	2
Ivory Coast	2016	0	0
Ivory Coast	2017	3	4
Total		37	9

Scores and results list Ivory Coast's goal tally first, score column indicates score after each Doumbia goal.

List of international goals scored by Seydou Doumbia
No.	Date	Venue	Opponent	Score	Result	Competition
1	18 November 2009	Veltins-Arena, Gelsenkirchen, Germany	Germany	2–1	2–2	Friendly
2	27 May 2012	Stade Municipal Saint-Leu-la-Forêt, Saint-Leu-la-Forêt, France	Mali	1–0	2–1	Friendly
3	6 September 2014	Stade Félix Houphouët-Boigny, Abidjan, Ivory Coast	Sierra Leone	1–1	2–1	2015 Africa Cup of Nations qualification
4	20 January 2015	Estadio de Malabo, Malabo, Equatorial Guinea	Guinea	1–1	1–1	2015 Africa Cup of Nations
5	9 October 2015	Stade Adrar, Agadir, Morocco	Morocco	1–0	1–0	Friendly
6	10 June 2017	Stade Bouaké, Bouaké, Ivory Coast	Guinea	1–0	2–3	2019 Africa Cup of Nations qualification
7	10 June 2017	Stade Bouaké, Bouaké, Ivory Coast	Guinea	2–1	2–3	2019 Africa Cup of Nations qualification
8	2 September 2017	Stade d'Angondjé, Libreville, Gabon	Gabon	2–0	3–0	2018 FIFA World Cup qualification
9	2 September 2017	Stade d'Angondjé, Libreville, Gabon	Gabon	3–0	3–0	2018 FIFA World Cup qualification

== Honours ==
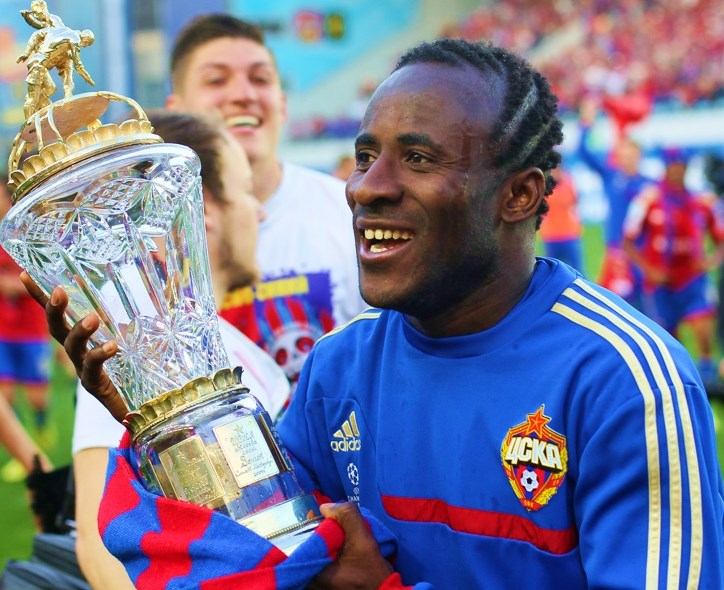
Doumbia in 2014

CSKA Moscow

- Russian Premier League: 2012–13, 2013–14
- Russian Cup: 2010–11, 2012–13
- Russian Super Cup: 2014

FC Basel

- Swiss Super League: 2016–17
- Swiss Cup: 2016–17

Sporting CP

- Taça da Liga: 2017–18

Ħamrun Spartans

- Maltese Premier League: 2020–21

Ivory Coast

- Africa Cup of Nations: 2015; runner-up: 2012

=== Individual ===
- Côte d'Ivoire Premier Division Top scorer: 2005
- Swiss Footballer of the Year: 2009, 2010
- Swiss Super League Player of the Year: 2008–09, 2009–10
- Swiss Super League Top scorer: 2008–09, 2009–10, 2016–17
- Russian Cup Top scorer: 2010–11
- Futbol Footballer of the Year in Russia: 2011, 2014
- Sport-Express Footballer of the Year in Russia: 2011
- Russian Premier League Player of the Month: November 2014
- Russian Premier League Player of the Year: 2011–12, 2013–14
- Russian Premier League Forward of the Year: 2011–12, 2013–14
- Russian Premier League Top scorer: 2011–12, 2013–14
