= Tomás Podstawski =

Portuguese footballer (born 1995)

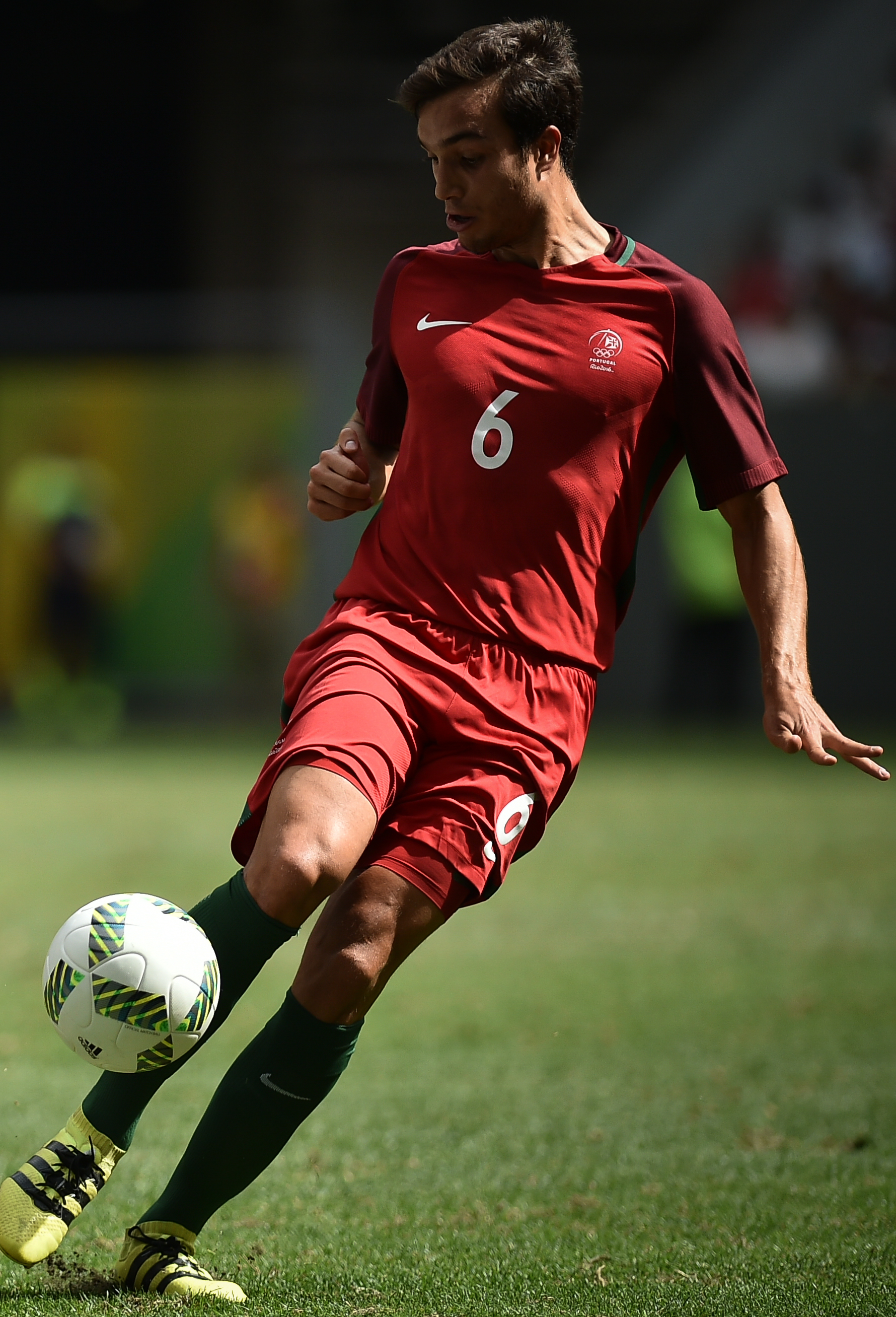
- Podstawski at the 2016 Summer Olympics

Personal information
- Full name: Tomás Martins Podstawski
- Date of birth: 30 January 1995 (age 31)
- Place of birth: Porto, Portugal
- Height: 1.82 m (6 ft 0 in)
- Position: Midfielder

Team information
- Current team: Paços Ferreira

Youth career
- 2003–2008: Boavista
- 2008–2013: Porto

Senior career*
Years	Team	Apps	(Gls)
2013–2017	Porto B	107	(1)
2017–2018	Vitória Setúbal	25	(1)
2018–2021	Pogoń Szczecin	77	(3)
2021	Stabæk	11	(0)
2022	Bnei Yehuda	7	(0)
2022–2023	Karmiotissa	6	(0)
2023–2024	Ruch Chorzów	10	(1)
2026	Sanjoanense	10	(0)
2026–	Paços Ferreira	0	(0)

International career
2010–2011	Portugal U16	10	(0)
2011–2012	Portugal U17	19	(3)
2012	Portugal U18	3	(0)
2012–2014	Portugal U19	37	(1)
2014–2015	Portugal U20	9	(0)
2015–2016	Portugal U21	3	(0)
2016	Portugal U23	4	(0)
Medal record
Men's football
Representing Portugal
UEFA European Under-19 Championship
Runner-up	2014 Hungary
- * Club domestic league appearances and goals as of 7 May 2026

Tomás Martins Podstawski (Polish: Tomasz Podstawski; born 30 January 1995) is a Portuguese professional footballer who plays as a central midfielder for Liga 3 club Paços de Ferreira.

He began his professional career at Porto, where he made 107 appearances for their reserves and won the 2015–16 Segunda Liga, but never represented the first team. After a season at Vitória de Setúbal in which he was a Taça da Liga runner-up, he joined Pogoń Szczecin in 2018.

Podstawski earned 85 caps for Portugal from under-16 to under-23 level. He represented the nation at the 2016 Olympic tournament.

== Club career ==
=== Porto ===
Born in Porto to a Polish father and a Portuguese mother, Podstawski joined FC Porto's youth system at the age of 13. On 20 February 2012, having not yet featured for the reserves, he was called up by first-team manager Vítor Pereira for the UEFA Europa League round of 16 second leg match at Manchester City, remaining unused in a 4–0 loss (6–1 aggregate) for the reigning champions.

Podstawski finished his first season with 24 appearances – 11 starts – helping Porto B to the runner-up position, although the team was not eligible for promotion. On 2 April 2016 he scored his first league goal in a 4–0 home win against Académico de Viseu FC, as they became the first reserves to win the second division.

=== Vitória Setúbal ===
On 12 June 2017, Podstawski signed a three-year contract for Vitória de Setúbal. He made his Primeira Liga debut on 6 August in a 1–1 home draw against Moreirense FC, and scored his first goal in the division on 30 October, consolation as a substitute in a 5–2 away defeat to Portimonense SC.

On 27 January 2018, Podstwaski was the only player to miss his penalty shootout attempt in the final of the Taça da Liga, lost to Sporting CP after a 1–1 draw in regulation time. He was also booked for handling the ball in his own box late into the game, which led to Bas Dost's equaliser.

=== Pogoń Szczecin ===
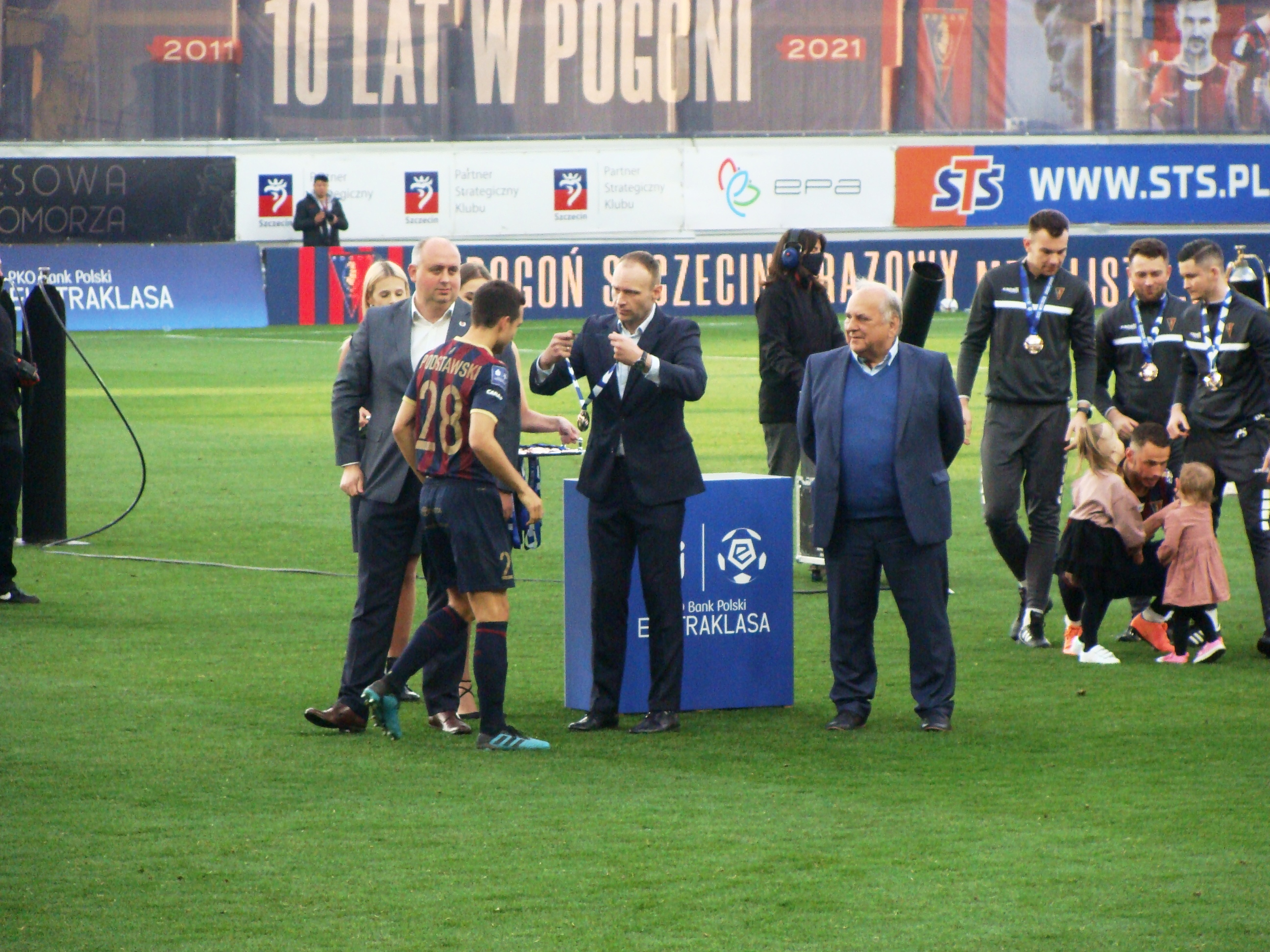
Podstawski receiving his bronze medal for the 2020–21 Ekstraklasa with Pogoń Szczecin

On 27 August 2018, Podstawski joined Polish club Pogoń Szczecin on a three-year deal. His maiden appearance in the Ekstraklasa occurred four days later, when he played the entire 1–1 draw away to Górnik Zabrze, and his first goal came on 27 October in a 3–0 home victory over Lech Poznań.

=== Later career ===
Having been without a club in the summer, Podstawski signed for Stabæk Fotball on 20 September 2021, for the rest of the year; the team from Oslo were in last place in Eliteserien.

Podstawski moved to Bnei Yehuda Tel Aviv F.C. of the Israeli Liga Leumit on 1 February 2022. On 28 June, he moved to the fourth foreign country in two years, signing for newly promoted Cypriot First Division club Karmiotissa FC.

On 6 September 2023, Podstawski returned to Poland and its top tier to undergo a trial at Piast Gliwice, closing a 3–0 friendly win over Ruch Chorzów shortly after; on the 18th, he joined the latter on a one-year contract with an option for another two years. He scored on his debut in a 3–5 home loss to Raków Częstochowa six days later, and left the club by mutual consent in February 2024.

After two seasons of inactivity, Podstawski then took his game to the Liga 3, where he represented A.D. Sanjoanense and F.C. Paços de Ferreira.

== International career ==
At the 2014 UEFA European Under-19 Championship in Hungary, Podstawski captained Portugal to runners-up position behind Germany. He scored his only goal of 37 appearances for the team in the group stage, in a 2–1 win against Austria at Pancho Aréna.

Podstawski also acted as captain to the under-20 side at the 2015 FIFA World Cup, playing four games out of five in an eventual quarter-final exit in New Zealand. He had previously turned down an approach from the Polish Football Association.

Manager Rui Jorge included Podstawski in the under-23 team for the 2016 Summer Olympics in Brazil. He started every match, as the nation reached the quarter-finals.

== Personal life ==
In parallel to his early professional career, Podstawski studied International Relations at the University of Porto. He speaks English and French, in addition to his native Portuguese and Polish. His parents were both involved in sport; his father as a Physical Education teacher and his mother as a professional gymnast.

Podstawski's younger brothers Filipe and António also became footballers, with the latter signing for Pogoń's reserves during his time at the club.

== Honours ==
Porto B

- Segunda Liga: 2015–16

Vitória Setúbal

- Taça da Liga runner-up: 2017–18

Portugal U19

- UEFA European Under-19 Championship runner-up: 2014

Individual

- UEFA European Under-19 Championship Team of the Tournament: 2014
