= Micael Silva =

Portuguese footballer

Mica
Personal information
- Full name: Micael Cabrita Silva
- Date of birth: 16 March 1993 (age 33)
- Place of birth: Silves, Portugal
- Height: 1.71 m (5 ft 7 in)
- Position: Midfielder

Team information
- Current team: Imortal
- Number: 28

Youth career
- 2001–2007: Silves
- 2007–2008: Imortal
- 2008–2011: Silves
- 2011–2012: Portimonense

Senior career*
Years	Team	Apps	(Gls)
2012–2014	Portimonense	46	(6)
2014–2016	Zawisza Bydgoszcz	44	(5)
2016–2018	União da Madeira	44	(8)
2018–2020	Sporting da Covilhã	50	(8)
2020–2021	Feirense	33	(2)
2021–2022	Farense	23	(2)
2022–2023	Penafiel	17	(0)
2024	Belenenses	7	(2)
2025–2026	Sporting da Covilhã	26	(0)
2026–	Imortal	4	(0)
- * Club domestic league appearances and goals as of 13 September 2026

Micael Cabrita Silva (born 16 March 1993), known as Mica, is a Portuguese professional footballer who plays as a midfielder for Campeonato de Portugal club Imortal.

== Career ==
On 30 December 2023, after spending the first half of the 2023–24 season as a free agent, Mica joined Liga Portugal 2 club Belenenses.
