= Kukula (footballer) =

Cape Verdean footballer

Personal information
- Full name: Erson Stiven Dias Costa
- Date of birth: 22 January 1993 (age 33)
- Place of birth: Santo Antão, Cape Verde
- Height: 1.75 m (5 ft 9 in)
- Position: Forward

Youth career
- –2010: Batuque
- 2010–2012: Marítimo

Senior career*
Years	Team	Apps	(Gls)
2010–2013	Marítimo B	81	(13)
2013–2017	Marítimo	13	(1)
2015–2016	→ Feirense (loan)	42	(5)
2016–2017	→ Vizela (loan)	33	(7)
2017–2019	Leixões	46	(6)
2019–2020	Sporting da Covilhã	41	(17)
2020–2022	Beroe	34	(4)
2022–2023	Sporting da Covilhã	45	(6)
2023–2024	Trofense	14	(1)
- * Club domestic league appearances and goals as of 1 January 2025

Erson Stiven Dias Costa (born 22 January 1993), simply known as Kukula, is a Cape Verdean professional footballer who plays as a forward.

In the 2012–13 season he scored his first goal in Liga Sagres against Moreirense. In July 2020, Kukula signed a two-year contract with Bulgarian club Beroe Stara Zagora.
