= Adul Seidi =

Guinea-Bissauan footballer (born 1992)

Personal information
- Full name: Gilberto Adul Seidi
- Date of birth: 20 November 1992 (age 33)
- Place of birth: Bissau, Guinea-Bissau
- Height: 1.84 m (6 ft 0 in)
- Position: Forward

Team information
- Current team: São João de Ver

Senior career*
Years	Team	Apps	(Gls)
2010–2011	Lusitano		
2011–2012	Alcobendas Sport		
2012–2013	Serzedelo	21	(13)
2013–2014	Fafe	18	(3)
2014–2015	Vianense	22	(13)
2015	União de Leiria	14	(7)
2015	ASIL Lysi	9	(1)
2015–2016	Gondomar	13	(5)
2016–2017	Benfica e Castelo Branco	15	(15)
2017–2018	Marítimo B	7	(2)
2017–2018	Marítimo	0	(0)
2017–2018	→ Sporting Covilhã (loan)	29	(3)
2018	Créteil	1	(0)
2018	Créteil	6	(0)
2019	União da Madeira	5	(0)
2019	Sintrense	7	(1)
2019–2020	Fabril Barreiro	13	(6)
2020–2021	Marinhense	20	(9)
2021–	São João de Ver	2	(0)

International career^{‡}
2014	Guinea-Bissau	2	(0)
- * Club domestic league appearances and goals as of 4 September 2021 ‡ National team caps and goals as of 10:01, 4 May 2020 (UTC)

Gilberto Adul Seidi (born 20 November 1992) is a Guinea-Bissauan professional footballer who plays for Fabril Barreiro, as a centre forward. In 2014, he made two appearances for the Guinea-Bissau national team.

== Club career ==
Born in Bissau, Seidi spent his early career with Lusitano, Alcobendas Sport, Serzedelo, Fafe, Vianense, União de Leiria, ASIL Lysi, Gondomar and Benfica e Castelo Branco.

On 11 January 2017, Seidi signed for Marítimo until July 2020. He played for their B team, and also spent time on loan at Sporting Covilhã.

In August 2018, he joined Créteil. In January 2019 he moved to União da Madeira for 6 months.

== International career ==
He made his senior international debut for Guinea-Bissau in 2014.
