= Xandão (footballer, born 1990) =

Brazilian footballer

Personal information
- Full name: Alexandre Rodrigues Soares
- Date of birth: 8 May 1990 (age 36)
- Place of birth: Itapecerica da Serra, Brazil
- Height: 1.89 m (6 ft 2 in)
- Position: Centre-back

Team information
- Current team: Boavista-RJ

Senior career*
Years	Team	Apps	(Gls)
2011–2012	Guarujá	37	(6)
2013–2016	Independente de Limeira	62	(6)
2016	CSA	4	(0)
2016–2017	Desportivo Aves	6	(0)
2017–2018	Oliveirense	11	(0)
2018	CSA	34	(0)
2019	Bahia	4	(0)
2020	CRB	23	(1)
2021	Ferroviária	9	(1)
2021	Vila Nova	13	(0)
2022	Inter de Limeira	10	(1)
2022	Chapecoense	10	(2)
2023	CSA	6	(1)
2023	Londrina	4	(0)
2023–2024	Varzim	28	(3)
2025–	Boavista-RJ	12	(0)
- * Club domestic league appearances and goals as of 00:41, 26 December 2025 (UTC)

Alexandre Rodrigues Soares (born 8 May 1990), commonly known as Xandão, is a Brazilian professional footballer who plays as a centre-back for Série D club Boavista-RJ.

== Club career ==
He made his professional debut in the Segunda Liga for Desportivo das Aves on 15 March 2017 in a game against Olhanense.

== Honours ==
CSA

- Campeonato Alagoano: 2018

Bahia

- Campeonato Baiano: 2019

CRB

- Campeonato Alagoano: 2020
