= Gonçalo Paciência =

Portuguese footballer (born 1994)

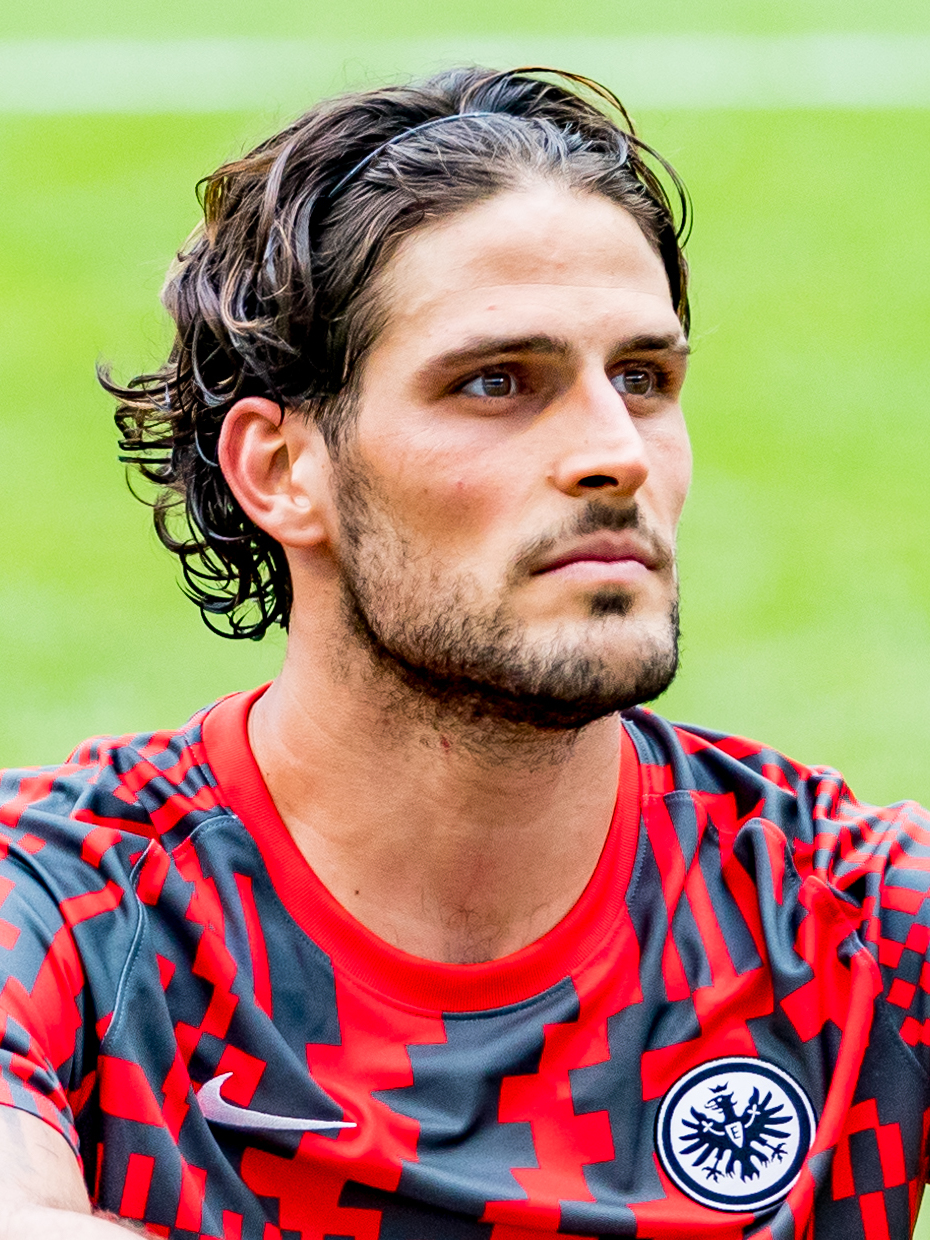
- Paciência with Eintracht Frankfurt in 2022

Personal information
- Full name: Gonçalo Mendes Paciência
- Date of birth: 1 August 1994 (age 32)
- Place of birth: Porto, Portugal
- Height: 1.84 m (6 ft 0 in)
- Position: Centre-forward

Team information
- Current team: Santa Clara
- Number: 9

Youth career
- 2002–2013: Porto
- 2009–2010: → Padroense (loan)

Senior career*
Years	Team	Apps	(Gls)
2013–2015	Porto B	35	(14)
2015–2018	Porto	10	(0)
2015–2016	→ Académica (loan)	27	(3)
2016	→ Olympiacos (loan)	1	(0)
2017	→ Rio Ave (loan)	15	(1)
2017–2018	→ Vitória Setúbal (loan)	18	(5)
2018–2022	Eintracht Frankfurt	52	(13)
2020–2021	→ Schalke 04 (loan)	15	(1)
2022–2024	Celta	25	(2)
2023–2024	→ VfL Bochum (loan)	19	(3)
2024–2025	Sanfrecce Hiroshima	8	(2)
2025	Sport Recife	15	(5)
2026–	Santa Clara	21	(8)

International career
2009–2010	Portugal U16	8	(1)
2010–2011	Portugal U17	17	(5)
2011–2012	Portugal U18	4	(2)
2013	Portugal U19	9	(7)
2013	Portugal U20	2	(0)
2014–2017	Portugal U21	17	(6)
2016	Portugal U23	4	(3)
2017–2019	Portugal	2	(1)
Medal record
Men's football
Representing Portugal
UEFA European Under-21 Championship
Runner-up	2015 Czech Republic
- * Club domestic league appearances and goals as of 18:01, 8 November 2026 (UTC)

Gonçalo Mendes Paciência (Portuguese pronunciation: [ɡõˈsalu pɐˈsjẽsjɐ]; born 1 August 1994) is a Portuguese professional footballer who plays as a centre-forward for Primeira Liga club Santa Clara, where he is captain.

Developed at Porto, he appeared mainly for the reserves during his spell, playing only 16 competitive games with the first team and also being loaned four times. In 2018, he signed with Bundesliga club Eintracht Frankfurt.

After representing Portugal at youth level, Paciência made his senior debut in 2017 and scored his only goal in his second match.

== Club career ==
=== Porto ===
Born in Porto, Paciência joined Porto's youth system at the age of only 8. He made his senior debut on 12 January 2014, starting for the B team in a 2–0 home win against Portimonense in the Segunda Liga. He scored his first goals in the competition on 22 March, helping to a 2–2 away draw with Feirense.

Paciência first appeared in competitive games with the main squad on 21 January 2015, again acting as starter in a 1–1 draw at Braga in the Taça da Liga. He netted his first goal in the same competition, in a 4–1 home victory over Académica de Coimbra that took place the following week.

On 29 July 2015, Paciência joined Académica in a season-long loan. On 31 August 2016, still owned by Porto, he moved to Olympiacos. His spell at the latter club, which was undermined by heart problems, was concluded in December.

Paciência continued to be loaned the following seasons, to Rio Ave and Vitória de Setúbal. On 25 August 2017, while at the service of the latter club, he scored an own goal in an eventual 1–1 away draw against Belenenses, coached by his father. On 27 January 2018, he netted early in the final of the League Cup and also converted his penalty shootout attempt, in a loss to Sporting CP after a 1–1 draw in regulation time.

=== Eintracht Frankfurt ===
On 12 July 2018, deemed surplus to requirements as practically all Portuguese players by manager Sérgio Conceição, Paciência signed a four-year contract with German club Eintracht Frankfurt. He made his debut on 18 August in the first round of the DFB-Pokal, in which he came on as a late substitute and scored a consolation in a 2–1 defeat for the holders at Regionalliga team SSV Ulm, but a month later he suffered a knee injury in training. He returned for his Bundesliga debut the following 17 February, as a last-minute replacement for Sébastien Haller in a 1–1 home draw with Borussia Mönchengladbach; he finished the season with three goals, beginning with the added-time winner against Hoffenheim at the Waldstadion on his first start.

Paciência scored seven league goals in 2019–20 campaign for the ninth-placed side (ten in all competitions), including two on 18 October in a 3–0 home win over Bayer Leverkusen. He played regularly under manager Adi Hütter alongside compatriot André Silva and Dutchman Bas Dost, making up for the sales of Haller, Luka Jović and Ante Rebić; on 25 January he signed a new contract until 2023.

On 15 September 2020, Paciência joined Schalke 04 on a year-long loan with an option to make the move permanent. His maiden league appearance took place three days later, when he started in the 8–0 away loss to Bayern Munich; on 18 October he scored his only goal for the eventually relegated team to gain a home draw against Union Berlin, their first point in the eighth game of the season. From November to April, he was sidelined with another knee injury.

Paciência scored twice in Eintracht's run to the 2022 UEFA Europa League Final, earning a win and a draw against Royal Antwerp. He was unused for the decisive match at the Ramón Sánchez-Pizjuán Stadium, a penalty shootout defeat of Rangers.

=== Celta ===
On 6 August 2022, Paciência moved to Spain after agreeing to a three-year deal at Celta de Vigo. He scored on his La Liga debut a week later, in a 2–2 home draw with Espanyol. He did not hold down a regular place in the team during his first season, particularly after the arrival of compatriot Carlos Carvalhal as manager, and his minutes dried up further after the signing of Haris Seferovic in January.

On 1 September 2023, Paciência returned to Germany after agreeing to a one-year loan deal at VfL Bochum. He terminated his contract with the Galicians on 19 August 2024.

=== Sanfrecce Hiroshima ===
On 2 September 2024, Paciência moved to Sanfrecce Hiroshima on a one-and-a-half-year deal. Twelve days later, he scored on his J1 League debut, in a 2–2 away draw against Kashima Antlers. He repeated the feat in his first appearance in the AFC Champions League Two, helping to a 3–0 home win over Kaya–Iloilo in the group phase.

=== Later career ===
Paciência moved clubs and countries again in January 2025, joining his compatriot manager Pepa at Sport Recife, recently promoted to the Campeonato Brasileiro Série A; he signed a contract until the end of the year. He scored five goals from 22 appearances, being relegated as bottom, and subsequently left.

On 27 January 2026, Paciência returned to Portugal after seven years away, on a deal until the end of the season at top-division Santa Clara that could be extended for another year.

== International career ==
Paciência earned 57 caps for Portugal at youth level, scoring 21 goals. His first game for the under-21 team was on 5 March 2014 at the age of 19, when he started and missed a second-half penalty in a 2–0 home win over North Macedonia in the 2015 UEFA European Championship qualifiers. Selected for the finals in the Czech Republic, he collected three substitute appearances for the runners-up, scoring in the 1–1 group stage draw with Sweden and converting his shootout attempt in the final against the same opponent.

Paciência was part of the squad at the 2016 Summer Olympics, netting three times in the group phase in an eventual quarter-final exit. He first appeared with the full side on 14 November 2017, coming on as a 46th-minute substitute for Gelson Martins in a 1–1 friendly draw against the United States. In his second match, exactly two years later, he played the entire 6–0 rout of Lithuania in the Algarve in the UEFA Euro 2020 qualifying stage, scoring the fourth goal.

== Personal life ==
Paciência's father, Domingos, was also a footballer and a forward. He too was developed at Porto.

== Career statistics ==
=== Club ===
As of match played 8 November 2026

Appearances and goals by club, season and competition
Club	Season	League			State league		National cup (Note: Includes Taça de Portugal, DFB-Pokal, Copa del Rey, Emperor's Cup, Copa do Brasil)		League cup (Note: Includes Taça da Liga, J.League Cup)		Continental		Other		Total	
Club	Season	Division	Apps	Goals	Apps	Goals	Apps	Goals	Apps	Goals	Apps	Goals	Apps	Goals	Apps	Goals
Porto B	2013–14	Segunda Liga	19	5	—		—		—		—		—		19	5
Porto B	2014–15	Segunda Liga	16	9	—		—		—		—		—		16	9
Porto B	Total		35	14	—		—		—		—		—		35	14
Porto	2014–15	Primeira Liga	1	0	—		0	0	3	1	0	0	—		4	1
Porto	2017–18	Primeira Liga	9	0	—		1	0	0	0	2 (Note: Appearances in UEFA Champions League)	0	—		12	0
Porto	Total		10	0	—		1	0	3	1	2	0	—		16	1
Académica (loan)	2015–16	Primeira Liga	27	3	—		2	1	1	0	—		—		30	4
Olympiacos (loan)	2016–17	Super League Greece	1	0	—		0	0	—		0	0	—		1	0
Rio Ave (loan)	2016–17	Primeira Liga	15	1	—		0	0	0	0	0	0	—		15	1
Vitória Setúbal (loan)	2017–18	Primeira Liga	18	5	—		2	1	5	5	—		—		25	11
Eintracht Frankfurt	2018–19	Bundesliga	11	3	—		1	1	—		6 (Note: Appearances in UEFA Europa League)	1	0	0	18	5
Eintracht Frankfurt	2019–20	Bundesliga	23	7	—		4	0	—		16	3	—		43	10
Eintracht Frankfurt	2021–22	Bundesliga	18	3	—		1	0	—		6	2	—		25	5
Eintracht Frankfurt	Total		52	13	—		6	1	—		28	6	0	0	86	20
Schalke 04 (loan)	2020–21	Bundesliga	15	1	—		1	0	—		—		—		16	1
Celta	2022–23	La Liga	25	2	—		3	1	—		—		—		28	3
VfL Bochum (loan)	2023–24	Bundesliga	19	3	—		0	0	—		—		2 (Note: Appearances in Bundesliga relegation play-offs)	0	21	3
Sanfrecce Hiroshima	2024	J1 League	8	2	—		1	0	1	0	3 (Note: Appearances in AFC Champions League Two)	2	—		13	4
Sport Recife	2025	Série A	6	0	9 (Note: Appearances in Campeonato Pernambucano)	5	1	0	—		—		6 (Note: Appearances in Copa do Nordeste)	0	22	5
Santa Clara	2025–26	Primeira Liga	12	3	—		—		—		—		—		12	3
Santa Clara	2026–27	Primeira Liga	9	5	—		0	0	0	0	—		—		9	5
Santa Clara	Total		21	8	—		0	0	0	0	—		—		21	8
Career total			252	52	9	5	17	4	10	6	33	8	8	0	329	75

=== International ===
Appearances and goals by national team and year
National team	Year	Apps	Goals
Portugal	2017	1	0
Portugal	2019	1	1
Total		2	1

Scores and results list Portugal's goal tally first, score column indicates score after each Paciência goal.

List of international goals scored by Gonçalo Paciência
No.	Date	Venue	Opponent	Score	Result	Competition
1	14 November 2019	Estádio Algarve, São João da Venda, Portugal	Lithuania	4–0	6–0	UEFA Euro 2020 qualifying

== Honours ==
Olympiacos

- Super League Greece: 2016–17

Porto

- Primeira Liga: 2017–18

Eintracht Frankfurt

- UEFA Europa League: 2021–22

Individual

- SJPF Segunda Liga Player of the Month: February 2015
- SJPF Segunda Liga Young Player of the Month: March 2014

== See also ==
- List of association football families
