= Jacob Adebanjo =

Nigerian footballer (born 1993)

Personal information
- Full name: Jacob Olorunwa Adebanjo
- Date of birth: 5 September 1993 (age 33)
- Place of birth: Lagos, Nigeria
- Height: 1.84 m (6 ft 0 in)
- Positions: Centre-back; defensive midfielder

Team information
- Current team: Valadares Gaia

Youth career
- Farense

Senior career*
Years	Team	Apps	(Gls)
2012–2014	Farense B		
2015	Quarteirense	13	(4)
2015–2017	Oliveirense	57	(9)
2017–2019	Vitória Setúbal	1	(0)
2018–2019	→ Merelinense (loan)	21	(3)
2019–2020	Sepsi OSK	2	(0)
2020–	Valadares Gaia	12	(0)
- * Club domestic league appearances and goals as of 26 August 2021

Jacob Olorunwa Adebanjo (born 5 September 1993) is a Nigerian professional footballer who plays as a centre-back or defensive midfielder.

== Honours ==
Vitória Setúbal

- Taça de Portugal: Runner-up 2017–18
