= Pedro Pinto (footballer, born 1994) =

Portuguese footballer

Personal information
- Full name: Pedro Manuel da Mota Pinto
- Date of birth: 8 November 1994 (age 31)
- Place of birth: Vila Nova de Gaia, Portugal
- Height: 1.85 m (6 ft 1 in)
- Position: Centre-back

Team information
- Current team: Feirense
- Number: 14

Youth career
- 2002–2005: Pedroso
- 2005–2008: Oliveira Douro
- 2008–2013: Leixões

Senior career*
Years	Team	Apps	(Gls)
2013–2016	Leixões	91	(0)
2016–2019	Vitória Setúbal	31	(0)
2019	→ Arouca (loan)	20	(0)
2019–2021	Leixões	41	(0)
2021–2025	Petro Atlético	102	(6)
2025–2026	Sumgayit	17	(0)
2026	Petro Atlético	5	(0)
2026–	Feirense	4	(0)
- * Club domestic league appearances and goals as of 04:31, 1 September 2026 (UTC)

Pedro Manuel da Mota Pinto (born 8 November 1994) is a Portuguese professional footballer who plays as a central defender for Liga Portugal 2 club Feirense.

== Club career ==
Born in Vila Nova de Gaia, Porto District, Pinto finished his youth career at Leixões. He spent his first three seasons as a senior with the first team in the Segunda Liga, making his debut in the competition on 27 October 2013 as a 46th-minute substitute in a 1–0 away win against Atlético Clube de Portugal. The following 26 January, he was sent off for two yellow cards at the end of the 0–2 home loss to Nacional in the group stage of the Taça da Liga.

On 20 July 2016, Pinto signed a contract with Primeira Liga club Vitória de Setúbal. His first top-division appearance took place on 3 December, in a 2–0 defeat at Sporting CP.

Pinto was mainly a backup during his tenure at the Estádio do Bonfim. In January 2019, he was loaned to second-tier side Arouca until June, where he rarely missed a match.

On 19 July 2019, Pinto rejoined Leixões. He moved abroad subsequently, going on to represent Petro Atlético (Angolan Girabola, two spells) and Sumgayit (Azerbaijan Premier League). On 2 April 2022, in service of Petro, he scored in a 5–1 loss away to Wydad in the group stage of the CAF Champions League; he repeated the feat in the following edition of the tournament, closing the 3–0 victory at Mozambique's Black Bulls in the first qualifying round.

On 6 July 2026, aged 31, Pinto returned to Portugal, joining Feirense on a two-year deal.
