= Bas Dost =

Dutch footballer (born 1989)

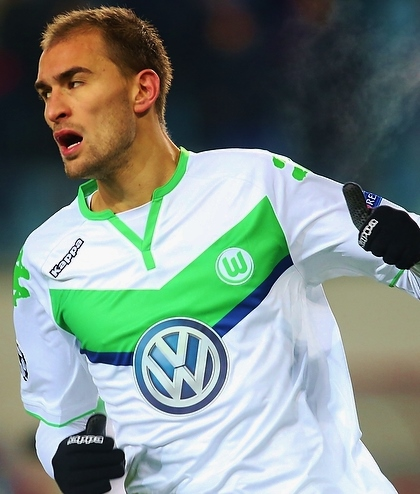
- Dost playing for VfL Wolfsburg in 2015

Personal information
- Full name: Bas Leon Dost
- Date of birth: 31 May 1989 (age 37)
- Place of birth: Deventer, Netherlands
- Height: 1.96 m (6 ft 5 in)
- Position: Striker

Youth career
- 1995–2001: Germanicus
- 2001–2007: Emmen

Senior career*
Years	Team	Apps	(Gls)
2007–2008	Emmen	23	(6)
2008–2010	Heracles	61	(17)
2010–2012	Heerenveen	66	(45)
2012–2016	VfL Wolfsburg	85	(36)
2016–2019	Sporting CP	84	(76)
2019–2020	Eintracht Frankfurt	36	(12)
2021–2022	Club Brugge	45	(21)
2022–2023	Utrecht	22	(9)
2023–2024	NEC	8	(3)
Total		430	(225)

International career
2009–2011	Netherlands U21	10	(5)
2015–2018	Netherlands	18	(1)
- * Club domestic league appearances and goals as of 19 May 2024

Bas Leon Dost (Dutch pronunciation: [bɑz ˈdɔst]; born 31 May 1989) is a Dutch former professional footballer who played as a striker.

Having begun his career at FC Emmen in the Eerste Divisie, Dost later played in the Eredivisie for Heracles Almelo and SC Heerenveen. In 2012, after being the top scorer in the league with 32 goals in 34 games, he was signed by VfL Wolfsburg. Four years later, having helped his team win the DFB-Pokal he signed for Primeira Liga side Sporting CP. He won the Bola de Prata for top scorer in his first Primeira Liga season, with 34 goals in 31 games. At Sporting, Dost won the Taça de Portugal once and the Taça da Liga twice, totalling 93 goals in 125 games.

Dost played for the Netherlands at under-20 and under-21 level. He was called up to the senior side for the first time in August 2012, but did not make his debut until March 2015. He earned 18 caps and scored once for the Netherlands national team before retiring from them in 2018.

== Club career ==
=== Early career ===
Born in Deventer, Dost's first club was CVV Germanicus in Coevorden, where he grew up and spent his youth career. After a few seasons, FC Emmen took Dost into their youth academy. He scored a hat-trick in the derby match against Veendam, which Emmen won 3–2.

Dost moved to Heracles Almelo in the summer of 2008. With 14 goals, he was the top scoring native player in the 2009–10 Eredivisie.

=== SC Heerenveen ===
On 18 May 2010, 20-year-old Dost was signed by SC Heerenveen for a transfer fee of around €3.2 million, on a five-year deal. In his first season, he was the club's top scorer with 13 league goals.

On 10 December 2011, Dost scored all five goals in Heerenveen's 5–0 win away to SBV Excelsior, taking his total to 14 goals in 16 Eredivisie games. He finished as the topscorer in the Eredivisie with 32 league goals in 34 matches.

=== VfL Wolfsburg ===
Dost joined German club VfL Wolfsburg in June 2012. He made his Bundesliga debut on 25 August 2012, scoring the winner away against VfB Stuttgart. Dost started the 2014–15 season as Wolfsburg's third choice striker and made his European debut in a 4–2 win against FC Krasnodar in the Europa League. In February 2015 Dost scored four goals, away from home against Bayer Leverkusen in a 5–4 win, his first hat-trick for the club in a run of scoring nine goals in 10 Bundesliga matches. Five days later he scored his first goals in a UEFA competition, scoring both in a 2–0 win against Sporting CP in the first knockout round of the Europa League.

Wolfsburg reached the final of the 2015 DFB-Pokal final. Dost headed in the final goal from an Ivan Perišić cross as Wolfsburg won 3–1 over Borussia Dortmund at the Olympiastadion.

=== Sporting CP ===
In August 2016, Portuguese club Sporting CP signed Dost for a club record €10 million, potentially rising to €12 million, and a buyout clause of €60 million. He made his debut on 10 September at home to Moreirense F.C., concluding a 3–0 win; thirteen days later he scored for the third successive game, netting twice in a 4–2 victory over G.D. Estoril Praia again at the Estádio José Alvalade.

Dost scored all of Sporting's goals on 11 March 2017 as they won 4–1 at C.D. Tondela; two were penalties, of which he later missed another. The league named him Player of the Month for March, with six goals in three games. On 9 April, he scored another hat-trick in a 4–0 home win over Boavista FC, and three weeks later another treble won the game 3–2 at S.C. Braga. He ended the season on 21 May with his fourth hat-trick of the campaign in a 4–1 home win over G.D. Chaves. With 34 league goals in 31 games, he was awarded the Bola de Prata as top scorer.

Dost scored another hat-trick against Chaves on 22 October 2017, in a 5–1 home win. On 1 December, he scored the only goal of a win over Lisbon neighbours C.F. Os Belenenses, taking him to 50 goals in 62 games across all competitions for the Lions. He scored another hat-trick on 7 January 2018 in a 5–0 home win over C.S. Marítimo and added another in a 3–0 win over C.D. Aves a week later. On 27 January, he scored two penalties – one to equalise in a 1–1 draw and the other in the penalty shootout – as Sporting won the 2018 Taça da Liga Final against Vitória F.C. at the Estádio Municipal de Braga.

In April 2018, Dost ended a run of 45 first time finishes when he took a touch before scoring in a Sporting win against Belenenses. Later, on 15 May, he and several of his teammates, including coaches, were injured following an attack by around 50 supporters of Sporting at the club's training ground after the team finished third in the league and missed out on the UEFA Champions League qualification. Despite the attack, he and the rest of the team agreed to play in the Portuguese Cup final scheduled for the following weekend, losing 2–1 to Aves. Days later, he terminated his contract with Sporting. However, after the dismissal of Bruno de Carvalho as club president, Dost signed an improved contract.

Dost was voted the Player of the Month and Striker of the Month for October/November 2018, with three goals in three games. In the 2019 Taça da Liga Final against FC Porto on 26 January, he scored a last-minute penalty to seal a 1–1 draw and send the game to extra time; he scored again in the penalty shootout as his club retained the title. On 25 May in the 2019 Taça de Portugal Final against the same opponents, he scored an extra-time goal and missed in the penalty shootout, but his team still won.

=== Eintracht Frankfurt ===
On 26 August 2019, Dost returned to the Bundesliga, signing a three-year contract at Eintracht Frankfurt. He arrived to replace departed strikers Luka Jović and Sébastien Haller, on a fee reported as €7 million. He scored on his debut six days later, a 2–1 victory over Fortuna Düsseldorf, having come on at half time for Dejan Joveljić.

Dost arrived at a club which had lost Jović, Haller and Ante Rebić in high-profile transfers, but combined well with Portuguese attacking duo André Silva and Gonçalo Paciência during his one full season.

=== Club Brugge ===
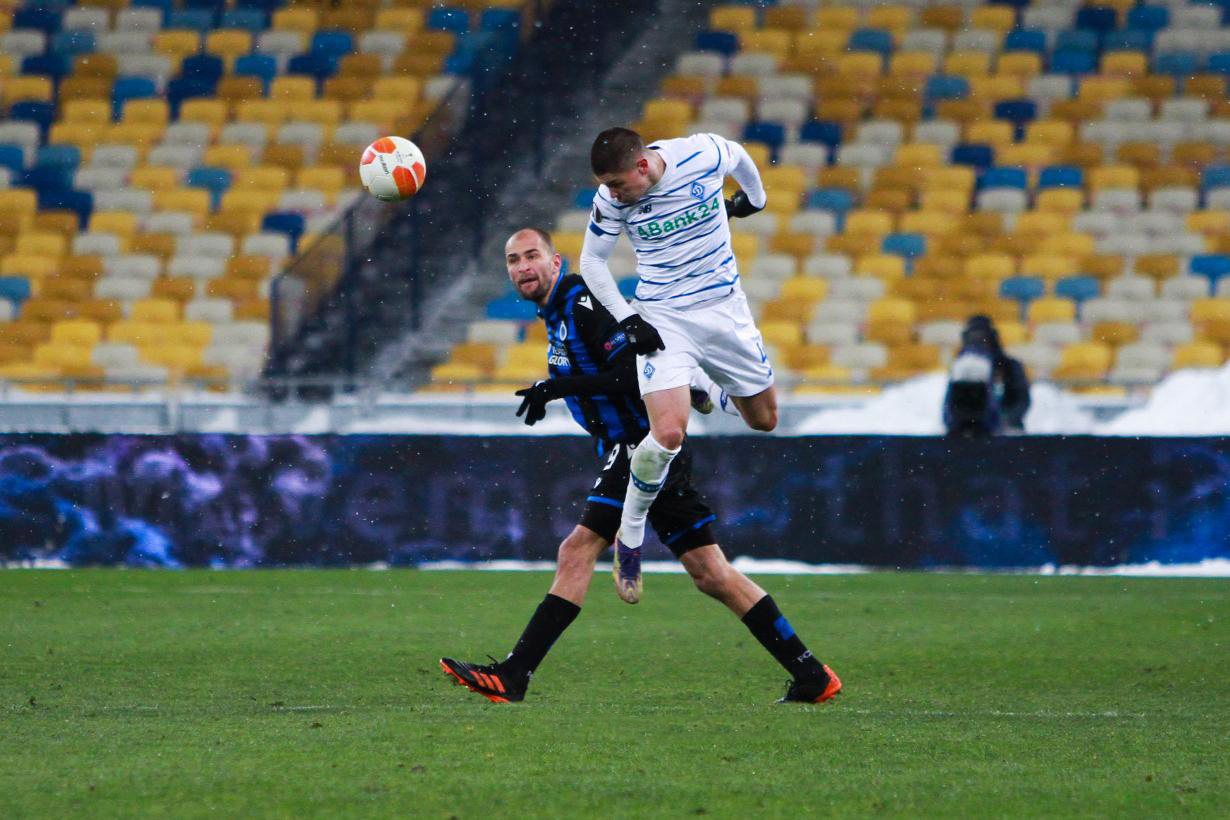
Dost (left) with Club Brugge in 2021

On 24 December 2020, Dost agreed to join Belgian First Division A club Club Brugge. He made his debut on 10 January away to Sint-Truidense V.V., scoring the opening goal of a 2–1 win. He ended his first half-season as league champion. His team retained the title in 2021–22, after which his contract expired.

=== Utrecht ===
On 1 July 2022, FC Utrecht announced the signing of Dost on a one-year contract, as he returned to the Eredivisie after a decade abroad. He made his debut on 6 August, scoring twice to gain an opening 2–2 draw at RKC Waalwijk.

=== NEC Nijmegen ===
In August 2023, Dost signed for fellow Eredivisie club NEC Nijmegen. On 29 October 2023, in a league match against AZ Alkmaar, he suddenly collapsed in the 90th minute. After prompt medical treatment on-field led to Dost regaining consciousness, he was transported to hospital. The match was subsequently suspended with the score at 2–1 to NEC Nijmegen. After the match, Dost said he is "doing well." He was not able to play for the remainder of the 2023–24 season, as his NEC contract ran out.

=== Retirement ===
In October 2023, Dost suffered a cardiac arrest while playing for NEC Nijmegen. After two years without playing, and following the discovery of further health complications, he announced his retirement from professional football in September 2025.

== International career ==
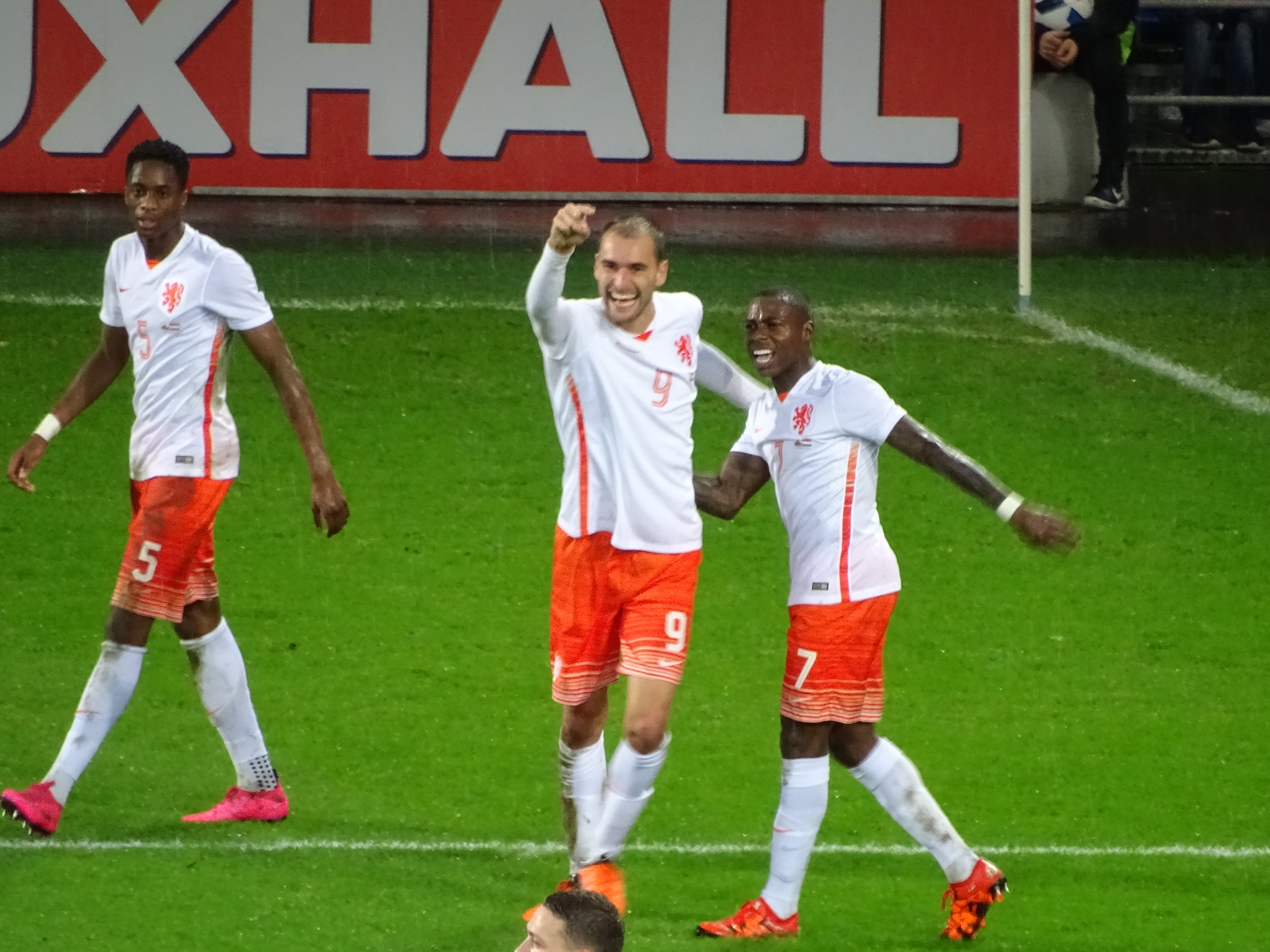
Dost celebrating his first and only international goal for the Netherlands in November 2015

In August 2012, he was called up by new manager Louis van Gaal for a friendly match in the King Baudouin Stadium in Brussels against Belgium but did not feature. He returned to the squad in March 2015 after a spell of good form for Wolfsburg, being named in Guus Hiddink's squad for a European qualifier against Turkey, and a friendly against Spain. He made his debut in the first match on 28 March at the Amsterdam ArenA, replacing defensive midfielder Nigel de Jong after 63 minutes as the Netherlands equalised for a 1–1 draw. On 13 November, away to Wales at the Cardiff City Stadium, he headed his first international goal to open a 3–2 win.

In April 2018 Dost announced his retirement from international football at the age of 28, saying that he had considered it for some time due to a lack of success with the national team.

== Personal life ==
Dost is in a relationship with Annefleur de Leeuw, a Dutch cyclist who competed for Sporting. Their son was born in July 2018.

== Career statistics ==
=== Club ===
As of match played 21 October 2023

Appearances and goals by club, season and competition
Club	Season	League			National cup (Note: Includes KNVB Cup, DFB-Pokal, Taça de Portugal, Belgian Cup)		League cup (Note: Includes Taça da Liga)		Europe		Other		Total	
Club	Season	Division	Apps	Goals	Apps	Goals	Apps	Goals	Apps	Goals	Apps	Goals	Apps	Goals
Emmen	2007–08	Eerste Divisie	23	6	1	0	—		—		—		24	6
Heracles	2008–09	Eredivisie	27	3	1	0	—		—		—		28	3
Heracles	2009–10	Eredivisie	34	14	3	1	—		—		2 (Note: Appearances in Eredivisie European play-offs)	1	39	16
Heracles	Total		61	17	4	1	—		—		2	1	67	19
Heerenveen	2010–11	Eredivisie	32	13	2	1	—		—		—		34	14
Heerenveen	2011–12	Eredivisie	34	32	5	6	—		—		—		39	38
Heerenveen	Total		66	45	7	7	—		—		—		73	52
VfL Wolfsburg	2012–13	Bundesliga	28	8	5	4	—		—		—		33	12
VfL Wolfsburg	2013–14	Bundesliga	13	4	2	1	—		—		—		15	5
VfL Wolfsburg	2014–15	Bundesliga	21	16	6	2	—		9 (Note: Appearances in UEFA Europa League)	2	—		36	20
VfL Wolfsburg	2015–16	Bundesliga	22	8	2	1	—		6 (Note: Appearances in UEFA Champions League)	1	1 (Note: Appearance in DFL-Supercup)	0	31	10
VfL Wolfsburg	2016–17	Bundesliga	1	0	1	1	—		—		—		2	1
VfL Wolfsburg	Total		85	36	16	9	—		15	3	1	0	117	48
Sporting CP	2016–17	Primeira Liga	31	34	2	1	2	0	6	1	—		41	36
Sporting CP	2017–18	Primeira Liga	30	27	4	2	4	1	11 (Note: Eight appearances and three goals in UEFA Champions League, three appearances and one goal in UEFA Europa League)	4	—		49	34
Sporting CP	2018–19	Primeira Liga	22	15	5	5	4	2	4	1	—		35	23
Sporting CP	2019–20	Primeira Liga	1	0	0	0	0	0	0	0	1 (Note: Appearance in Supertaça Cândido de Oliveira)	0	2	0
Sporting CP	Total		84	76	11	8	10	3	21	6	1	0	127	93
Eintracht Frankfurt	2019–20	Bundesliga	24	8	2	2	—		4	0	—		30	10
Eintracht Frankfurt	2020–21	Bundesliga	12	4	1	1	—		—		—		13	5
Eintracht Frankfurt	Total		36	12	3	3	—		4	0	—		43	15
Club Brugge	2020–21	Belgian Pro League	19	9	1	1	—		2	0	—		22	10
Club Brugge	2021–22	Belgian Pro League	26	12	5	2	—		3	0	1 (Note: Appearance in Belgian Super Cup)	0	35	14
Club Brugge	Total		45	21	6	3	—		5	0	1	0	57	24
Utrecht	2022–23	Eredivisie	22	9	0	0	—		—		2	0	24	9
NEC	2023–24	Eredivisie	8	3	0	0	—		—		—		8	3
Career total			430	225	48	31	10	3	45	9	7	1	539	269

=== International ===
Appearances and goals by national team and year
National team	Year	Apps	Goals
Netherlands
Netherlands	2015	4	1
Netherlands	2016	8	0
Netherlands	2017	5	0
Netherlands	2018	1	0
Total		18	1

Score and result list Netherlands' goal tally first.

List of international goals scored by Bas Dost
No.	Date	Venue	Opponent	Score	Result	Competition
1.	13 November 2015	Cardiff City Stadium, Cardiff, Wales	Wales	1–0	3–2	Friendly

== Honours ==
VfL Wolfsburg

- DFB-Pokal: 2014–15
- DFL-Supercup: 2015

Sporting CP

- Taça de Portugal: 2018–19
- Taça da Liga: 2017–18, 2018–19

Club Brugge

- Belgian Pro League: 2020–21, 2021–22
- Belgian Super Cup: 2021

Individual

- Eredivisie Top Scorer: 2011–12
- KNVB Cup Top Scorer: 2011–12
- kicker Bundesliga Team of the Season: 2014–15
- O Jogo Primeira Liga Team of the Year: 2017
- Primeira Liga Top Scorer: 2016–17
- Primeira Liga Player of the Month: March 2017, October/November 2018 December 2018
