= Patrick Vieira (footballer, born 1991) =

Brazilian footballer

Personal information
- Full name: Patrick de Oliveira Vieira
- Date of birth: 22 January 1991 (age 35)
- Place of birth: Machado, Minas Gerais, Brazil
- Height: 1.78 m (5 ft 10 in)
- Position: Right-back

Youth career
- 2010–2011: América Mineiro

Senior career*
| Years | Team | Apps | (Gls) |
| 2012–2015 | América Mineiro | 28 | (2) |
| 2011 | → Francana (loan) | 0 | (0) |
| 2013 | → Ipatinga (loan) | 19 | (1) |
| 2014 | → ABC (loan) | 26 | (3) |
| 2015–2017 | Marítimo | 59 | (1) |
| 2017–2018 | Benfica | 0 | (0) |
| 2017–2018 | → Vitória FC (loan) | 16 | (2) |
| 2018–2021 | Santa Clara | 44 | (0) |
| 2020 | → Coritiba (loan) | 14 | (1) |
| 2021–2022 | Mafra | 1 | (0) |
| 2023 | Linense | 10 | (0) |
| 2023–2024 | Anadia | 19 | (1) |
- * Club domestic league appearances and goals as of 4 May 2024

Patrick de Oliveira Vieira (born 22 January 1991), simply known as Patrick Vieira, is a Brazilian professional footballer who plays as a right-back.

== Club career ==
On 16 August 2015, Patrick signed a two-year contract with Marítimo in Portugal, where he would play 71 matches and one goal in two seasons. In June 2017, he signed for Portuguese champions Benfica.

On 25 November 2022, Patrick signed with Linense for the 2023 season.
