= Babylist =

American baby registry company

Babylist Inc.
- Type: Private
- Industry: Gift registries
- Founded: 2011; 15 years ago
- Founder: Natalie Gordon
- Headquarters: Emeryville, California, U.S.
- Number of locations: 2 (2026)
- Key people: Jennifer Hyman (CEO); Natalie Gordon (Executive chair)
- Services: Baby registries
- Revenue: ▲US$750 million (2025)
- Website: babylist.com

Babylist is an American baby registry firm based in Emeryville, California. It was founded in 2011 by Natalie Gordon and is led by Chief Executive Officer Jennifer Hyman.

== History ==
Babylist was founded in 2011 by Natalie Gordon. It was initially monetized solely through affiliate link purchases. It began focusing heavily on TikTok marketing in 2022. It also opened a branded content studio, Push, the same year, which creates advertisements for paying brands. Babylist Health launched in 2022 to assist parents with navigating insurance for breast pumps and purchased SourceMD, a provider of breast pumps. The company opened a showroom in Los Angeles in 2023. That year, it had US$400 million in revenue and acquired mindfulness app Expectful to serve as the distribution platform for Babylist's health content. In January 2025, the company organized brands and volunteers to provide supplies to families impacted by the January 2025 Southern California wildfires from its Los Angeles showroom.

The company launched Babylist Money and an associated podcast in 2026 to assist parents with Trump accounts. The same year, it opened a showroom in New York City.

== Operations ==
Babylist is led by Chief Executive Officer Jennifer Hyman, and founder and executive chair Natalie Gordon. It had revenues of US$750 million in 2025. The company generates revenue through direct sales and affiliate links. It is based in Emeryville, California. Fast Company named it one the most innovative retail companies of 2024 and 2026.
