= Mercado Global =

Guatemalan non-profit organization

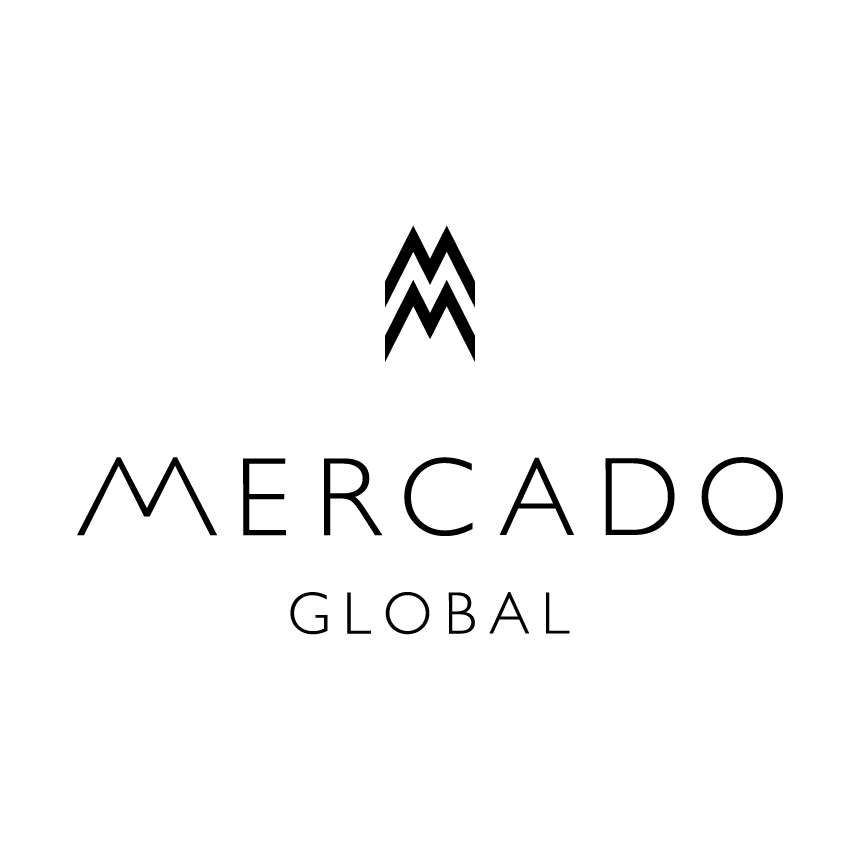
- Founded: 2004
- Founder: Ruth Degolia and Benita Singh
- Type: 501(c)3 Non-profit Organization
- Location: Brooklyn, New York, Panajachel, Sololá, Guatemala
- Website: www.mercadoglobal.org

Mercado Global is a non-profit social enterprise organization based in Panajachel, Guatemala. The company states that their mission is "to link indigenous artisans in rural Guatemalan communities to international sales opportunities, providing sustainable income-earning opportunities, access to business training and community-based education programs, and access to microloans for technology such as sewing machines and floor looms." Mercado Global's network reportedly includes over 300 artisans in thirty-one artisan cooperatives. The company says that their members have seen their daily income increase three-fold compared to the average Guatemalan wage.

Mercado Global has offices in Brooklyn, NY and Panajachel, Guatemala.

== Mission and model ==
Mercado Global's partner artisans represent rural indigenous women, and was founded to assist these women, some of whom are one of the most marginalized groups in the world. Mercado Global's goal is to provide funds from donors to educate women to become successful business owners.

Mercado Global focuses on change from the ground up. It provides education, tools, and access to international markets so that women can build their own businesses and invest in their own communities. The partner artisans have endured various forms of discrimination, violence, and extreme poverty. Through a dual approach that combines business partnerships with educational programs, Mercado Global connects women to international sales opportunities. Mercado Global partner artisans are rising to become leaders in their communities and a source of change in global sourcing practices.

== Internships ==
As part of its mission to foster a sense of global responsibility among the next generation of leaders and consumers, Mercado Global accepts a limited number of students as interns at its offices in Guatemala and Brooklyn. The internship offers the opportunity to learn about the inner workings of a non-profit organization while becoming familiar with the growing fair trade industry.

Like many non-profit organizations, Mercado Global lists its internships on the interactive website idealist.org.

== Awards ==
- 2007 Brick Award from the Do Something Foundation.
- Executive Director Ruth DeGolia recognized as an "Architect of the Future" by Austria's Waldzell Institute for being an "exceptional emerging world leader and social entrepreneur" in September 2007.
- DeGolia and co-founder Benita Singh featured on the cover of Newsweek magazine in honor of their selection as two of the "15 People Who Make America Great" on July 10, 2006.
- Innovation in Social Enterprise Award from the Social Enterprise Alliance in April 2005.
- DeGolia and Singh named among "the World's Best Emerging Social Entrepreneurs" by the Echoing Green Foundation in 2004.
- Yale Entrepreneurial Society's Grand Prize at the Annual Business Plan Competition in 2004.
