= Yale Entrepreneurial Society =

Yale Entrepreneurial Society (YES)
- Abbreviation: YES
- Formation: 1999
- Type: Nonprofit, Yale Student Organization
- Legal status: non-profit 501(c)(3)
- Purpose: supporting student innovation and entrepreneurship at yale
- Headquarters: New Haven, Connecticut
- Location: 254 Elm Street New Haven, CT 06511
- Members: 300
- Presidents: Oliver Hime & Leïa Ryan
- Affiliations: Yale Entrepreneurial Institute Tsai Center for Innovative Thinking at Yale
- Website: yesyale.org

The Yale Entrepreneurial Society (YES) is a student-run nonprofit 501(c)(3) organization dedicated to encouraging entrepreneurship and business development in the New Haven, Connecticut area. YES was founded in 1999 by Yale undergraduates Sean Glass and Miles Lasater. Its social entrepreneurship program—focused on not-for-profit and socially responsible organizations—was founded the same year, with efforts led by fellow student David Pozen. Today, YES members include Yale undergraduate, graduate, professional students, and faculty, as well as several hundred Yale alumni around the world.

The Yale Entrepreneurial Society's mission is the following:

1. Create and foster a community of entrepreneurs at Yale; promote the belief that entrepreneurial principles can be applied to any endeavor
2. Offer resources helpful to students at any level of engagement with entrepreneurship
3. Offer educational and networking opportunities to foster new venture creation; teach the lean startup model
4. Organize campus and regional events to encourage innovation at Yale
5. Publish information concerning new, events and opportunities

== YES Accelerate ==
In 2023 YES Accelerate was created as an exclusive accelerator portal for YES members including a rolling common application exclusive to YES Fellows and VC partners. Members can apply to Techstars, Z Fellows, Contrary, Sequoia Arc, Pear VC, MiraclePlus, Entrepreneurs Roundtable Accelerator, Insight Partners, O'Shaughnessy Ventures, Lair East Labs, XFund, and Connecticut Innovations, all through one form. They can also access a resource hub, legal counsel, and more. YES Accelerate can be found linked on the YES official website.

== LAUNCH pre-orientation program ==
In 2022, following Yale's shift to mandatory pre-orientation programs for first-year students, YES began designing LAUNCH – a Camp Yale First-Year Pre-orientation Program focused on impact and entrepreneurship. LAUNCH held its inaugural session on August 22–26, 2023, welcoming around one hundred first-year students, and was run in partnership with Tsai CITY.

== YES internships ==
The YES Internship Program connects undergraduates from across the United States to internship opportunities with 150+ YES-affiliated start-ups, ranging from pre-seed companies to those currently financing a Series C. The program seeks to allow students to help build a start-up from scratch while working with experienced entrepreneurs. YES internship participants observe the process of building a product to scale while collaborating with a small team.

== Speakers & Yale INSPIRE Series ==
YES brings entrepreneurs and successful businesspeople to speak at Yale's campus, particularly Yale alumni founders.

In fall 2023, the Yale INSPIRE speaker series was created, bringing alumni founders back to campus for a fireside chat and dinner (typically at Mory's). These events were hosted in partnership with the Tsai Center for Innovative Thinking at Yale and recorded and published on YouTube.

Past speakers include:

- Joe Tsai, co-founder of Alibaba
- Kevin Ryan, founder of AlleyCorp (MongoDB, Business Insider) and CEO at DoubleClick
- Mariam Naficy, founder of Minted
- Michael Redd, co-founder of 22 Ventures and NBA Player
- Sara Du, founder of Alloy Automation
- Max Mullen, co-founder of Instacart
- Anne Wojcicki, founder of 23andMe
- Michael Seibel, co-founder of Twitch and Managing Director at Y-Combinator
- April Koh, co-founder of Spring Health
- Sander Daniels, founder of Thumbtack
- Kevin Tan, founder of SnackPass
- Tom Lehman, founder of Genius
- Emmett Shear, co-founder of Twitch
- Ann Miura-Ko, founder of Floodgate
- Donna Dubinsky, CEO at Palm Inc
- Gary Stewart, former Managing Director at Techstars NYC in partnership with J.P. Morgan
- Warren Buffett, business magnate
- Evan Spiegel, founder of Snapchat
- Diane Von Fürstenberg, designer and style icon
- Jennifer Fleiss, founder of Rent the Runway
- Elmar Mock, co-inventor of Swatch
- Brad Hargreaves, co-founder of General Assembly
- Amanda Moskowitz, co-founder of Nine Naturals
- Wendy Kopp, founder of Teach for America

== Yale Venture Challenge ==
The Yale Venture Challenge was previously known as Y50K. It was held annually in April, and awarded up to $25,000 in grants to student entrepreneurs. The competition involved a 10-minute pitch and a 5-minute Q&A in front of a panel of judges.

The Y50K was YES's annual business plan competition. The competition ran annually after its inception in 2000. Each year, a total of $50,000 in grants were given away to new businesses in the Yale community. In 2004, a biotechnology category was added to the usual two categories of competition, social entrepreneurship and for-profit. The Y50K also had a strategic alliance with StudentBusinesses.com that allows the competition to be conducted completely online. In the early 2010s Y50K was changed to YVC, open only to students at Yale University.

== Elevator Pitch Competition ==
The Elevator Pitch Competition promoted idea generation and presentation from any student in the Yale community. Pitches were no longer than three minutes, and a fully hashed-out business plan was not required. Barry Nalebuff was traditionally the judge for this competition. Past winners include Ovote, Prepd, and Junzi Kitchen.

== The Yale Entrepreneurial Magazine ==
The Yale Entrepreneurial Magazine, published and supported by the Yale Entrepreneurial Society, is Yale's only magazine of entrepreneurship. First published in 2001, the YE went out of publication in 2003 until being relaunched in the fall of 2013 by Nicole Clark and Aaron Lewis. The Yale Entrepreneurial Magazine has since gone out of print and is now succeeded by the Yale Entrepreneurial Society newsletter and alumni newsletter.

== Regional events ==
YES hosts a variety of events throughout the year to highlight entrepreneurship at Yale and in the greater New Haven and Connecticut regions. While venues vary from year to year, common events usually include YES New York, YES Boston, and the Innovation Summit (hosted in New Haven). Students annually visit tech companies and startups in New England including Google, Etsy, Dropbox, Spotify, Rent the Runway, and Venture for America. The organization has also held events in Silicon Valley.
