= CSD Panajachel =

Association football club in Guatemala

Panajachel
- Full name: Club Social y Deportivo Panajachel
- Nickname(s): Monos verdes (green monkeys)
- Founded: 2015
- Ground: Estadio Municipal San Francisco; Panajachel, Sololá Department, Guatemala
- Capacity: 2,000
- Manager: (Guatemala) Rey Sosa
- League: Segunda División de Ascenso
- Website: https://m.facebook.com/Csd-Panajachel-Fc-Oficial-100819374780258/
Home colours	Away colours

Club Social y Deportivo Panajachel is a Guatemalan football club from Panajachel, Sololá Department. It currently plays in Segunda División de Ascenso, the third tier of Guatemalan football.

== History ==
It was founded on 2015 after the other club from Panajachel moved to Coatepeque.
