= MyRegistry.com =

American software company

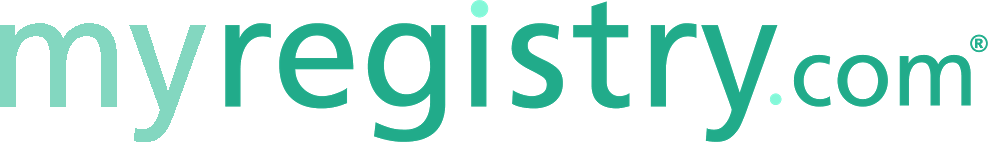
- Type: Company
- Industry: Universal Gift Gifting | Gifting Software
- Founded: Fort Lee, New Jersey (2005)
- Founder: Oded Berkowitz (CEO)
- Headquarters: Fort Lauderdale, FL
- Area served: North America, UK, Australia, South Africa and India
- Key people: Nancy Lee, President
- Products: Gift registry
- Number of employees: 60
- Website: myregistry.com

MyRegistry.com is a gift registry service company founded in 2005 and headquartered in Fort Lauderdale, FL. The company's platform allows users to create gift lists combining items from multiple retailers.

== History ==
MyRegistry.com was founded in 2005 by Oded Berkowitz in Fort Lee, New Jersey.In July 2026, the company relocated its headquarters to Fort Lauderdale, Florida

== Business model ==
=== Consumer services ===
The company's primary service is a centralized universal gift registry platform that allows users to create wedding registries, baby registries, and general gift lists by adding items from a wide range of online and physical retailers into a single consolidated registry. Users can sync existing store registries from participating retailers to manage multiple registries in one place.

The platform also includes features such as cash gift funds and a social connection tool known as "Friends Circle," which allows users to connect with friends, get birthday reminders and view each other’s gift lists. MyRegistry.com is accessible via its website and a mobile application designed to enable registry creation, gift additions, syncing, and list management.

=== Enterprise solutions ===
MyRegistry.com provides registry and gift list technology to retailers through business-to-business partnerships. The company offers integration solutions for e-commerce platforms including Shopify and Wix, as well as custom implementations for larger retail clients.

=== Non-profit services ===
The platform also serves charitable organizations by providing fundraising and donation management tools.

== Partnerships ==
The company has established partnerships with various retailers David's Bridal, Bed Bath & Beyond, Men's Wearhouse, and Canadian Tire for registry integration services.

== Geographic presence ==
MyRegistry.com operates in North America, the United Kingdom, Australia, South Africa, and India.

== Media Coverage ==
MyRegistry.com has been cited in various national and digital media outlets for its insights into consumer behavior and gift-giving trends. The company has been featured in publications including ConsumerAffairs, MSN, NTD, LivingEtc, Retail Boss, The Southern Maryland Chronicle, Republic, and Robins Post. Coverage has referenced company data and commentary on topics such as holiday shopping habits, gift anxiety, registry trends, cash fund preferences, and broader shifts in how consumers approach gifting for weddings, baby showers, and other life events.
