= Frankel Building Group =

Frankel Building Group is a custom home builder that operates in the Houston, Texas, region. The company is known for constructing homes that meet the standards set by the U.S. Green Building Council's Leadership in Energy and Environmental Design (LEED) program. Frankel homes are generally priced between $800,000 and $2 million.

The company specializes in two areas: design-build and green building. Design-build is a construction approach where the design and construction teams work together from the outset to create a cohesive and efficient project. The company's focus on green building allows them to construct homes that are environmentally sustainable and energy-efficient.

== Company history ==
Houston native Jim Frankel founded Frankel Building Group as Jim Frankel Custom Homes in 1988. He started building roughly three homes a year, and within the next few years, Frankel doubled and tripled the number of houses built until he could no longer manage the volume. Jim's sons, Scott and Kevin Frankel, joined the company in 2005 and the family-run business became Frankel Building Group. Jim Frankel is the company's president and his sons serve as vice presidents.

== Company principals ==
=== Jim Frankel ===
Jim Frankel developed his business acumen while serving as a corporate office executive for Foley's department stores in Houston during the 1970s. While building his business, Jim served as president of the Greater Houston Builders Association (GHBA) in 2001, and is a Life Director. He also served as a National Association of Home Builders (NAHB) and Texas Association of Builders (TAB) director. He achieved NAHB Graduate Master Builder (GMB) designation. Jim Frankel served as the first chairman of the Development Council of Texas Children's Hospital.

=== Kevin Frankel ===
Kevin Frankel, a licensed real estate broker with an MBA from the University of Houston, is the VP of sales and business development for Frankel Building Group. In 2014 he became vice president of the GHBA and a TAB director. He previously served as a GHBA board member and was the association's Custom Builders Council chair in 2010. Kevin Frankel is a Certified Green Professional (CGP), and won the 2012 GHBA Green Building Advocate Individual award.

=== Scott Frankel ===
Scott Frankel is VP of operations and construction for Frankel Building Group. Like his father, he earned the GMB designation. In 2011, Scott Frankel became Texas' first Master Certified Green Professional (Master CGP) and one of only two in the nation. He is also a Certified Graduate Builder (CGB), Certified Green Professional (CGP), and a member of the Houston Business Journal's 40 Under 40 Class of 2012. In 2014, he served as a director of the TAB.

== Green building smart homes ==
Under the direction of Kevin and Scott Frankel, the family-owned company started building all custom homes to LEED standards in 2009. The homes built included green features such as spray foam insulation, tank-less water heaters and dual-speed air conditioning. Within two years, Frankel Building Group had registered 25 homes for LEED certification. The company also became one of the first homebuilders to adopt the GHBA's Green Built Gulf Coast (GBGC) program introduced in 2010 that utilized green building practices appropriate for the Texas Gulf Coast.

In addition to standardizing green building, Frankel Building Group in 2010 made smart home technology standard in its custom homes. The basic Crestron home automation system included an in-wall docked iPad to control the system and security, providing control of lighting, HVAC, entertainment systems, garage, gates, fountains and pool.

=== Design-build firm ===
Frankel Building Group is a custom design-build firm, meaning they design the homes they build in-house. The company uses architectural design software for a 3-D look at the home's design. In 2013, Frankel invested over $50,000 to create a design studio in Ladco Washington Park Design Studio for free client use. Together with a trade partner, the company also designed a computer program for use in the design studio. Using a hand-held scanner similar to gift registry and an iPad, homebuyers browse through the design studio selecting texture and materials for walls, flooring, countertops, roofs and exterior finishes. Frankel puts the selections together to show the buyers what their custom home will look like.

== Communities ==
Frankel Building Group designed and built custom homes in the Houston area's high-end neighborhoods including Bellaire, Bunker Hill Village, Cinco Ranch, Hunters Creek, Tanglewood, The Woodlands and West University. In 2010, the builders developed a 50-acre community, ParkGate Reserve, in Shenandoah, Texas.

=== ParkGate Reserve ===
Located near the front of The Woodlands, ParkGate Reserve is a community of 58 custom high-performance homes designed and built by Frankel Building Group. The new luxury homes lots range from about 10,000 to 27,000 square feet, with prices averaging at about $170 per square foot for two-story homes and $220 per square foot for one story houses, land included.

=== The Woodlands Reserve ===
In 2013, Frankel Building Group announced plans to develop a new luxury neighborhood in The Woodlands' Village of Indian Springs. The Woodlands Reserve, Frankel's first development project within The Woodlands, became a gated community of 55 residential lots ranging from 12,000 to 23,000 square feet. The 4,000 square foot and up custom homes featured a blend of Southern Coastal and Southern French designs with open floor plans, large patios and front porches. Prices for the energy-efficient smart homes built with low impact on the surrounding environment started at about $1 million.

=== Lakes of Shadow Creek ===
In 2014, Frankel Building Group began developing new custom homes on 44 lots in the new Lakes of Shadow Creek residential community. The 23.6 acre luxury gated community is located southwest of The Woodlands, three miles from the new ExxonMobil campus and zoned to Klein Independent School District. Residential lots range from 12,000 to 25,000 square feet. Prices for the 3,500 square feet and up custom smart homes designed and built to LEED for Homes standards by Frankel Building Group ranged from about $895,000 to $1.4 million.

== Company awards ==
2014 GHBA Houston's Best PRISM Awards:

- Custom Builder of the Year
- Custom Home Design - $2 Million to $2.5 Million
- Custom Home Design - $1.5 Million to $2 Million
- Custom Home Design - under $500,000
- Custom Home Elevation - $2 Million to $2.5 Million
- Custom Home Elevation - under $500,000
- Custom Home Bathroom - Home Under $1 Million

2013 GHBA Houston's Best PRISM Awards:

- Custom Builder of the Year
- Custom Home Design - $1 Million to $1.5 Million
- Custom Home Elevation - $1.5 Million to $2 Million
- Custom Home Elevation - $500,000 TO $1 Million
- Custom Home - Outdoor Living Space
- Custom Home Bathroom - Home Over $1 Million

2012 GHBA Houston's Best PRISM Awards:

- Green Building Single Family Project of the Year - Custom Builder
- Custom Home Kitchen - Home Under $1 Million
- Remodeled Specialty Room
- Remodeled Outdoor Living Space

2012 Texas Association of Builders Star Awards:

- Custom Builder - Best Showroom / Sales Center
- Custom Builder - Best Interior Design - $500K - $699K
- Custom Builder - Best Kitchen - $500K - $699K
- Custom Builder - Best Kitchen - $700K - $799K
- Custom Builder - Best Outdoor Living Space - $500K - $799K

2011 NAHB Nationals Silver Awards:

- Best Outdoor Living Space
- Most Unique Space, Katy Home
- Most Unique Space, Shenandoah Home

2010 GHBA Houston's Best PRISM Awards:

- Custom Builder Grand Award
- Green Building Single Family Home of the Year - Builder
- Custom Home Design, $800,000 to $1.2 Million
- Custom Home Front Elevation, $1.2 Million to $1.8 Million
- Custom Home Specialty Room Home, Under $1 Million
- Custom Home Bedroom Home, Under $1 Million
- Custom Home Bathroom, Home Under $1 Million

2010 Texas Association of Builders Star Awards:

- Overall Interior Design for a Home $500,001 - $1 Million
- Best Master Bathroom for a Home $500,001 - $1 Million
- Best Kitchen for a Home $500,001 - $1 Million
- Best Interior Entry/Foyer for a Home $500,001 - $1 Million
- Best Outdoor Living Space

2009 Texas Association of Builders Star Awards: Best Outdoor Project

2009 GHBA Houston's Best PRISM Awards:

- Houston's Best Custom Home Design $1.2 to $1.8 Million
- Houston's Best Custom Home Outdoor Living Space
- Houston's Best Custom Garden/ Patio Home

2009 Cinco Ranch Custom Showcase -Winner: Best in Show
