= Camille Fournier =

American businesswoman

- Education: Carnegie Mellon University; University of Wisconsin–Madison (MSc)
- Occupations: Engineering executive; author; speaker
- Employers: JPMorgan Chase — Managing Director; Former: Two Sigma; Rent the Runway (CTO); Goldman Sachs
- Known for: Former chief technology officer of Rent the Runway; author of The Manager's Path
- Notable work: The Manager's Path: A Guide for Tech Leaders Navigating Growth and Change (O'Reilly, 2017); 97 Things Every Engineering Manager Should Know: Collective Wisdom from the Experts (editor, O'Reilly, 2019)
- Website: https://www.camilletalk.com/

Camille Fournier is known for being the former chief technology officer of Rent The Runway, former vice president of technology at Goldman Sachs, a former managing director at JPMorgan Chase, and author of The Manager's Path: A Guide for Tech Leaders Navigating Growth and Change. She is currently the VP Engineering of Common Services at CoreWeave.

== Career ==
Fournier earned her bachelor's degree in computer science from Carnegie Mellon University. After graduating, she worked at Microsoft for 18 months. In 2005, she graduated from the University of Wisconsin–Madison with a master's degree in computer science. She moved on to work at Goldman Sachs in New York for over six years, originally as an engineer working on credit risk software and eventually as a vice president of technology.

In 2011, Fournier joined the startup Rent the Runway as the director of engineering, and in 2014 she became the company's chief technology officer. She resigned from her chief position in 2015.

Fournier writes the Ask The CTO column for O'Reilly Media. In 2017, she published a book titled The Manager's Path: A Guide for Tech Leaders Navigating Growth and Change. In 2019, she published a book as the editor titled 97 Things Every Engineering Manager Should Know: Collective Wisdom from the Experts.
