= Volcán San Pedro =

Volcano in Guatemala

- Las Yeguas
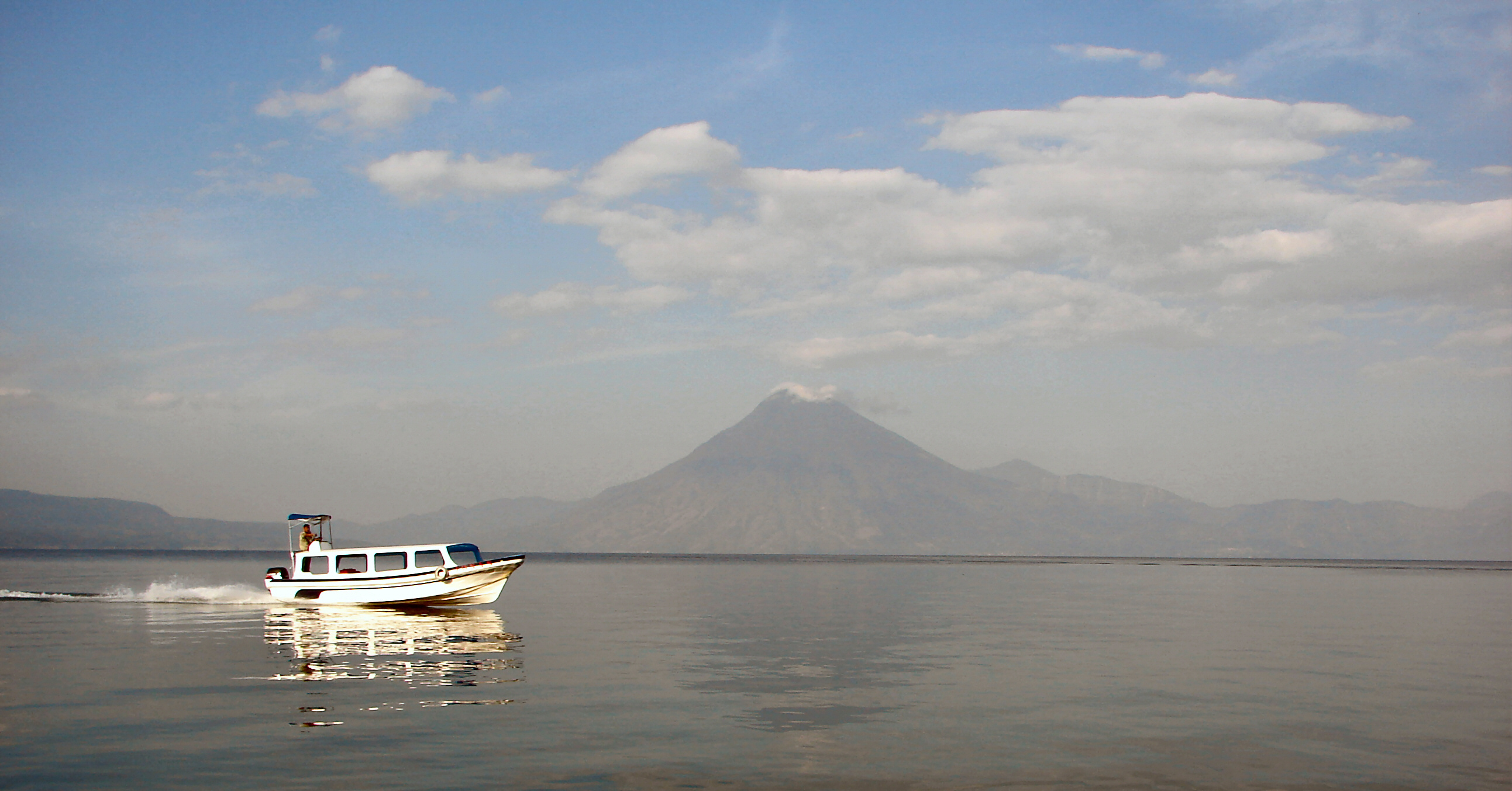
- Volcán San Pedro, seen from Panajachel

Highest point
- Elevation: 3,020 m (9,910 ft)
- Listing: Volcanoes in Guatemala
- Coordinates: 14°39′21″N 91°15′57″W

Geography
- Location within Guatemala
- Location: Sololá, Guatemala
- Parent range: Sierra Madre

Geology
- Mountain type: Stratovolcano
- Volcanic arc: Central America Volcanic Arc
- Last eruption: unknown

Volcán San Pedro (or Las Yeguas) is a 3,020-metre (9,908 ft) stratovolcano on the shores of Lago de Atitlán, in the Sololá Department of southern Guatemala. It is part of the mountain range of the Sierra Madre.

At the base of the volcano is the village of San Pedro La Laguna.

The following table synthesizes the morphological, bioclimatic, and ecological infrastructure features of the San Pedro stratovolcano within the Lake Atitlán basin:

Geomorphological and Ecological Profiles of Volcán San Pedro
Feature / Zone	Technical Parameter / Elevational Range	Primary Ecosystem & Vegetation	Volcanological & Ecotourism Significance
Summit & Crater	3,020 m (9,908 ft)	High-altitude cloud forest, epiphytes, and moss-covered basalt	Inactive Holocene stratovolcano with a shallow, heavily vegetated summit crater.
Upper Slopes	2,200–2,800 m	Oak-pine forest, wild avocado, and bromeliads	Primary habitat for the horned guan (Oreophasis derbianus) along birdwatching corridors.
Ecological Park Base	1,560–2,100 m	Tropical montane forest and shade-grown coffee plantations	Managed community park featuring trailhead facilities, interpretive lookouts, and guide networks.

== Notes ==
=== References ===
- Siebert L, Simkin T (2002–present). Volcanoes of the World: an Illustrated Catalog of Holocene Volcanoes and their Eruptions. Smithsonian Institution, Global Volcanism Program Digital Information Series, GVP-3 (http://www.volcano.si.edu).
