= Pedro Silva (footballer, born 1997) =

Portuguese footballer

Personal information
- Full name: Pedro José Moreira da Silva
- Date of birth: 13 February 1997 (age 29)
- Place of birth: Sintra, Portugal
- Height: 1.89 m (6 ft 2 in)
- Position: Goalkeeper

Team information
- Current team: Mafra
- Number: 33

Youth career
- 2007–2009: Sporting Lourel
- 2009–2016: Sporting CP

Senior career*
Years	Team	Apps	(Gls)
2015–2019	Sporting CP B	73	(0)
2018–2019	→ Tondela (loan)	0	(0)
2019–2020	Tondela	0	(0)
2020	Køge	0	(0)
2020–2022	Vizela	34	(0)
2022–2023	Estoril	3	(0)
2023–2024	Penafiel	27	(0)
2024–2025	Alverca	1	(0)
2025–	Mafra	20	(0)

International career
2012	Portugal U15	1	(0)
2012−2013	Portugal U16	6	(0)
2013−2014	Portugal U17	13	(0)
2015	Portugal U18	3	(0)
2015−2016	Portugal U19	12	(0)
2015	Portugal U20	6	(0)
- * Club domestic league appearances and goals as of 09:59, 5 August 2026 (UTC)

Pedro José Moreira da Silva (born 13 February 1997) is a Portuguese professional footballer who plays as a goalkeeper for Liga 3 club Mafra.

== Club career ==
Born in Sintra, Lisbon District, Silva joined Sporting CP's youth system in 2009, aged 12. 8 August 2015, he made his senior debut with their reserves, in a 0–0 home draw against C.D. Feirense in the Segunda Liga.

Silva appeared in ten matches in the 2017–18 season, as his team were relegated after finishing in 18th position. On 8 July 2018, he was loaned to Primeira Liga club C.D. Tondela. During his spell at the Estádio João Cardoso, he played four games in all competitions.

On 10 January 2020, Danish 1st Division side HB Køge announced that they had signed Silva on a contract running until summer 2022. He returned to his country on 18 July 2020, agreeing a to a two-year deal at newly-promoted F.C. Vizela. He contributed 15 appearances in his first season in another promotion, but subsequently spent four months on the sidelines due to a right-foot syndesmosis injury.

Silva made his debut in the Portuguese top flight on 28 December 2021, in a 2–0 away loss to C.S. Marítimo. He retained his place until the end of the campaign, and the side managed to avoid relegation.

In August 2022, Silva joined G.D. Estoril Praia on a three-year contract. He returned to the second tier after only one, however, agreeing to a two-year deal at F.C. Penafiel.

Silva signed a contract with second-division club F.C. Alverca on 20 July 2024.
