= Wish list =

List of wishes of an organization or an individual

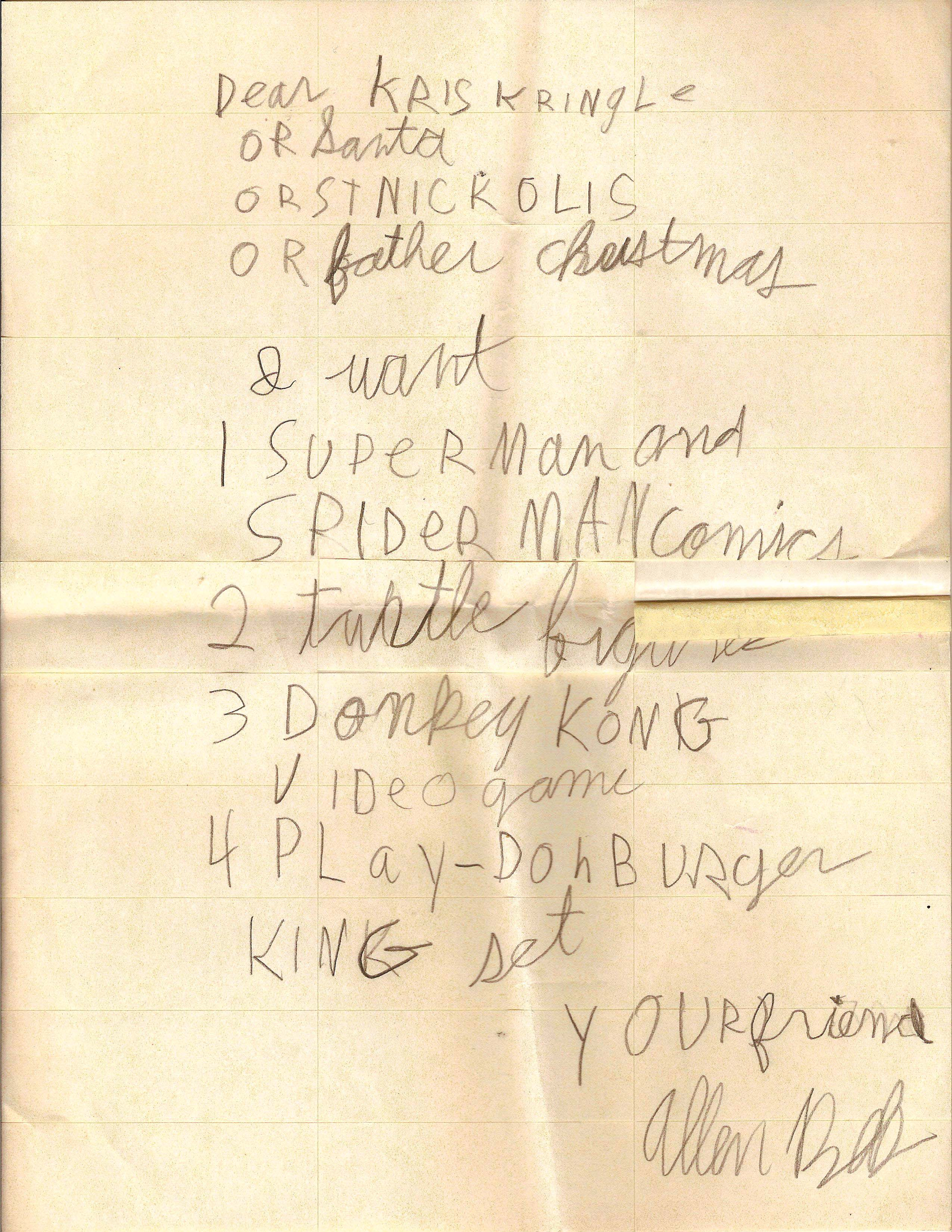
A child's Christmas wish list from 1990

A wish list, wishlist or want list is a list of goods or services that a person or organization desires. They have become more prevalent with the growth of online shopping.

The author may distribute copies of their list to family, friends, and other stakeholders who are likely to purchase gifts for the would-be recipient or to offer some of the listed items for sale. The goal of a wish list is to facilitate communication between the gift receiver and the gift giver. Wish lists often contain items that a gift purchaser can obtain from a variety of retailers. Some wish lists are specialized for particular purposes or concentrated at individual retailers, such as gift registries (e.g., bridal registries).

== Occasions ==
In some cultures, people often exchange wish lists before major holidays that include gift-giving, such as Christmas and birthdays. Other common occasions for issuing wish lists include baby showers, housewarmings, weddings, and charity drives.

== Types ==
- A gift registry is a type of wish list that contains only items that can be purchased at the store which manages the registry.
- An online wish list is a type of wish list that is hosted on the Internet. Online wish lists can be associated with a retailer or universal.
- A product wish list is similar to a list of functional requirements. The difference is mainly the importance of the requested functionality. Items that might be on the wish list at one time may be expected to be requirements later.
- A software user wishlist is a type of wish list that is created by the software manufacturer (such as the software development company or the website owner) or by user groups.
- A bucket list is a type of personal wish list consisting of things a person wishes to do before they die (i.e. "kick the bucket") or before they reach a life stage milestone (e.g., the end of childhood; the end of High School, etc.) The name was popularised in the 2007 film The Bucket List.

== Online ==
An online wish list typically allows a registered user to create a wish list, add wishes to it, and then spread a link to the wish list via email or social media. Visitors to the published wish list can in most cases comment wishes and reserve them. This adds a collaborative perspective among the viewers that would be much harder to achieve for analog wish lists. Online wish lists on retailer websites allow you to save items you prefer from that retailer's site for future reference. Universal online wish lists allow you to add items from multiple retailers and even non-retail ideas.

== Software users ==
Software user wish lists are a compilation of user suggestions for requested features. Many enterprise websites and software packages offer users the option to add a "wish" – a suggestion for improvement or change – and to vote on the importance of suggestions supplied by the publisher or author of the website or software, and they attempt to give a quick response to the suggestions. For example, Microsoft Visual Studio has a "community" menu, and Facebook has a "suggestions" section.

In many cases, when a company fails to supply such a framework, users create their own lists, in Internet forums or in blogs. When such a list becomes popular, the company must respond to common requests.

Having software user wish lists has become popular since 2007 when a football gaming community FIFPlay started collecting fans wishlist for Electronic Arts for pre-development of FIFA (video game series) and it has collected over 10,000 ideas and suggestions for FIFA 08.

== See also ==
- 100 Things to Do Before High School – television series
