= Panajachel =

City and municipality in Sololá, Guatemala

- City and municipality
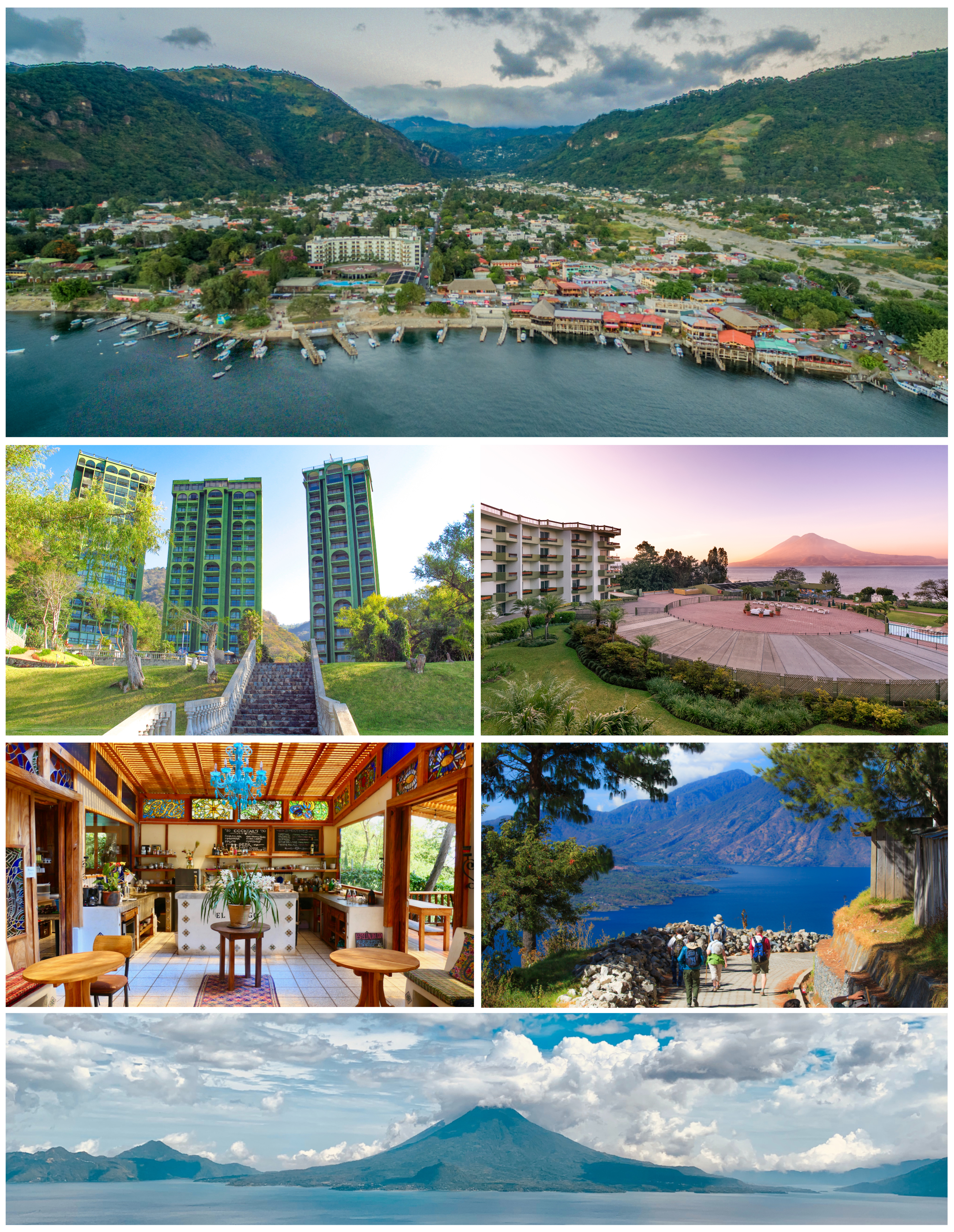
- From left to right: View of the town, Hotel La Riviera de Atitlán, Porta Hotel del Lago, a local restaurant, hikers on the east side of the lake, panorama of Lake Atitlán.

- Location in Guatemala
- Coordinates: 14°44′26.2″N 91°9′33.9″W
- Country: Guatemala
- Department: Sololá

Government
  - Type: municipal
  - Mayor (2016-2020): Enio Roberto Urizar Batres (UNE)
- Elevation: 1,597 m (5,240 ft)
- Lowest elevation: 1,562 m (5,125 ft)

Population (2018)
  - Total: 15,077
- Time zone: UTC-6 (Central Time)
- Country code: 502
- Climate: Aw

Panajachel (Spanish pronunciation: [pa.na.xaˈtʃel], Pana) is a town in the southwestern part of the Guatemalan Highlands, less than 140 kilometres (90 mi) from Guatemala City, in the department of Sololá. It serves as the administrative centre for the surrounding municipality of the same name. The elevation is 1,597 metres (5,240 ft). The population in the 2018 census was 15,077.

Geographically situated on an alluvial delta formed by the Panajachel River "San Francisco" along the northeastern shore of Lake Atitlán, the town lies within a volcanic basin flanked by the Atitlán, Tolimán, and San Pedro volcanoes. It serves as a primary regional transport hub and economic center within the Sololá Department, facilitating waterborne access to surrounding Tz'utujil and Kaqchikel Maya settlements across the endorheic lake, becoming a center for the tourism industry of the area as it provides a base for visitors crossing the lake to visit other towns and villages.

"Panajachel" derives from the Kaqchikel language and roughly translates to "place of the Matasanos," the white sapote fruit tree.

== History ==
=== Spanish colony ===
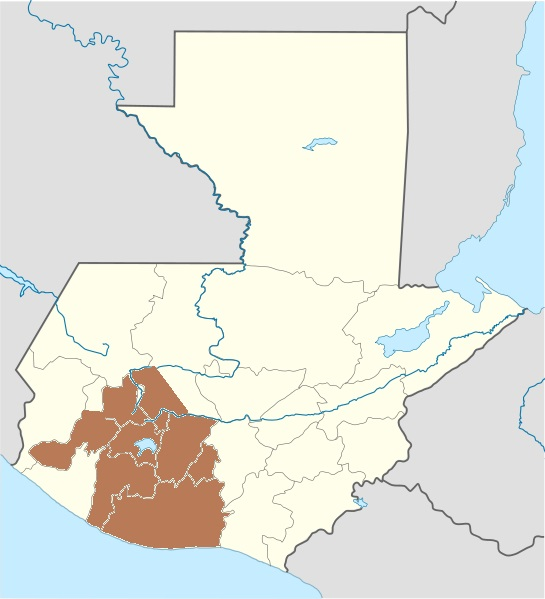
Some of the 24 convents of the Franciscan Provincia del Santísimo Nombre de Jesús during the Spanish colony in Guatemala and the approximate area it doctrines occupied.

In the 16th century, during the period of the Spanish conquest of Guatemala, the shore of the lake was the scene of a battle in which the Spanish and their Kaqchikel allies defeated the Tz'utujils. After the Spanish conquest of Guatemala, the Franciscans set up a church and monastery in Panajachel soon afterward, and used the town as a centre to convert the indigenous people of the region to the Roman Catholic faith. The original façade of the church still stands and is considered one of the gems of the colonial style in Guatemala.

Panajachel was part of the Tecpán Atitlán "corregimiento" (English: Province) and when it turned into a major municipality in 1730, Panajachel became part of it as well; regarding the Catholic faith, this was in charge of the Franciscans, who had convents and doctrines in the area covered by the modern departments of Sacatepéquez, Chimaltenango, Sololá, Quetzaltenango, Totonicapán, Suchitepéquez and Escuintla. The "Provincia del Santísimo Nombre de Jesús" (English:"Province of the most Holy Name of Jesus"), as the Franciscan area was then called, reached up to 24 convents. By 1700, Panajachel had a convent with three priests, in charge of ca. 1800 people, four doctrines and twelve cofradías.

Given that Panajachel had a convent, there was daily Mass attended by cofradías leaders and their wives, who kept lighted candles during most of the ceremony. Also daily, there was religious teaching for 6-year-old girls and older starting at 2:00 pm and for boys of the same age starting at sunset; the class lasted for 2 hours and consisted on memorizing the church teaching and prayers and to make some exercises with the catechism and it was run by a priest or by elder natives, called "fiscales". Adults attended Mass every Sunday and holiday and after mass, there were religious teachings in their own language.

Lent was a time of the year when the friars prepared the natives thoroughly, using their own language to accomplish their goals; every Friday of Lent there was a procession following the Rosary steps all the way to the Calvary temple.

In 1754, as part of the Bourbon Reforms, the Franciscans were forced to give their doctrines to the secular clergy; thus, when archbishop Pedro Cortés y Larraz visited Panajachel in 1770, he described it as the "San Francisco Panajachel parish".

=== Visit of archeologist Alfred P. Maudslay in 1892 ===
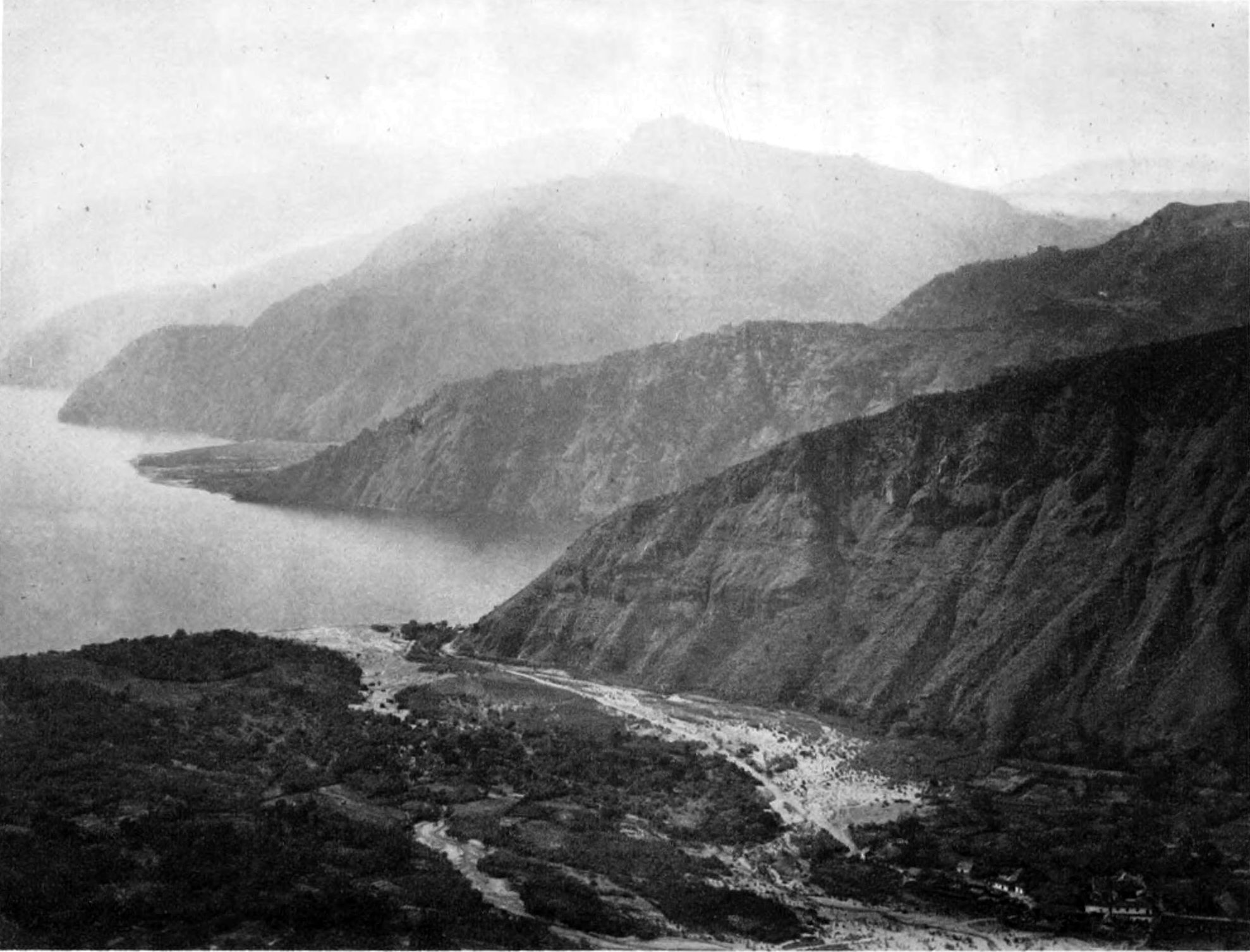
Panajachel in 1892; notice how bare were the surrounding hills. Photograph by Alfred Percival Maudslay.

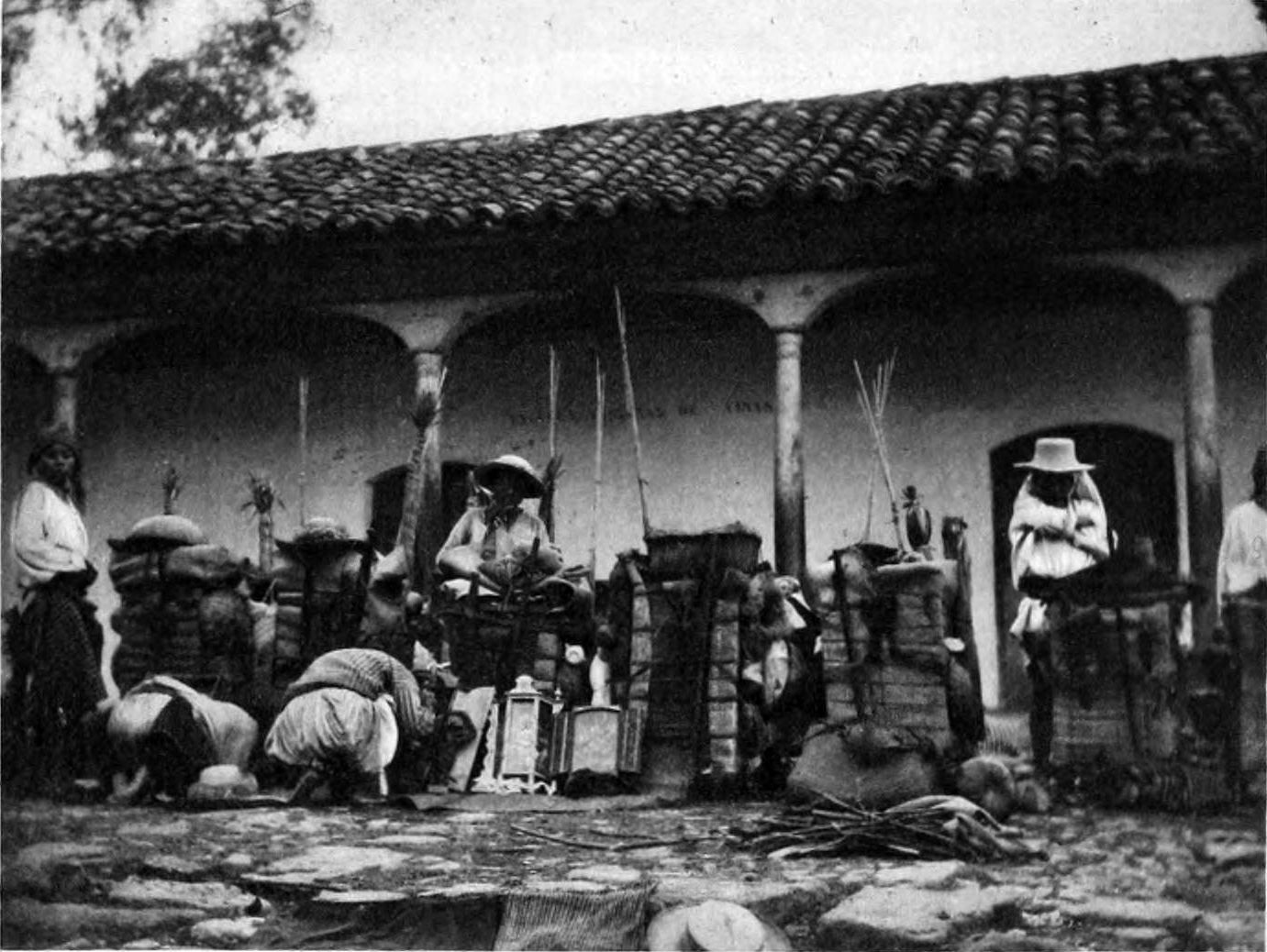
Panajachel natives getting ready for a maya ceremony in honor of the Catholic Cristo Negro of Esquipulas in 1892. Photograph by Alfred Percival Maudslay.

In 1892, British archeologist Alfred Percival Maudslay and his wife, Anne Maudslay, visited Panajachel during their long journey throughout Guatemala; their impressions were reported in their book A glimpse at Guatemala, published in 1899. They arrived to the town after spending a night in San Antonio Palopó and a short trip of 12 km; Anne Maudslay described Panajachel location as this: "a little town standing on a rich alluvial plain formed by a swift stream which issues from a narrow cleft in the hills, and has spread out the earth in the shape of an open fan until it forms a mile of frontage to the Lake Atitlan."

By 1892, Panajachel people had already built numerous irrigation canals which had altered the normal stream bed to work on orchards, gardens and coffee plantations at the delta area. Nevertheless, the channels were insufficient to protect the town infrastructure against flooding, which occurred once in a while; in fact, several years prior to the visit of the Maudslays, there had been a large flood that destroyed several houses and left the town isolated. The town itself was not that interesting to the visitors, but their surroundings were marvelous: the volcanos, mountains and Lake Atitlan, whose green forests contrasted with the bare hills that surrounded Panajachel. Life in town seemed monotonous to Anne Maudslay, especially that of women who seemed to have the same day every day, grinding corn to make tortillas and leaning over the stream shore to wash their family clothes. Only those women that sold their produce in the central plaza market in the morning had a slightly different routine.

While in Panajachel, the visitors witnessed a religious ceremony by numerous pilgrims that were returning from visiting Esquipulas; pilgrims gathered in the central plaza that night around fires that they set for their food, and once they were done with their supper, they placed petates -native Guatemalan mats- on the floor in a line that crossed the plaza. Each one of them grabbed a small wooden box where they produced a small Catholic saint sculpture, leaving that of the Esquipulas Black Christ, in the center. Once the preparations were ready, they began the ritual by cradling from one mat to the next, always on their knees and pressing their forehead against the floor in front of each saint; every man did this for several times and in the end, they all gathered around the Black Christ and sang a hymn for about thirty minutes; once done, gathered their belongings and went to sleep on the plaza floor. Anne Maudslay tells in her book that even though this seemed like a Catholic ritual, it was, in fact, a Mayan one; several priests that they found during their journey told them that they were not sure that the natives had really absorbed the Catholic faith that the conquistadors tried to instill in them for centuries.

=== 20th century ===
The town attracted many Hippies in the 1960s, but the numbers of foreign visitors plummeted during the Guatemalan Civil War. After the war ended, tourists started coming back, and Panajachel's economy is once again primarily based on tourism.

=== 21st century: Hurricane Stan ===
Panajachel was seriously affected by torrential rains as a result of Hurricane Stan in October 2005 with a major mudslide destroying about 100 homes along the river.

== Places of interest ==
Casa Cakchiquel built in 1948, was one of the first hotels on the lake and according to legend, Ernesto "Che" Guevara, Ingrid Bergman, and other intellectuals, artists, painters and writers enjoyed the house at its best. Today the house serves as the Cultural Center and is lovingly restored and one of two historic buildings "patrimonio culturales" (the central Church of Saint Francis of Assisi being the other) in Panajachel. Casa Cakchiquel features a Museum & Gallery space that is presenting Guatemala's first and unique historical photo museum with over 3000 photo images between 1860 - 1970 and Guatemala's most important photographers like Emilio and Roberto Eichenberger, Alberto G. Valdeavellano, Adolfo Biener, G. Hurter, Joaquín Muñoz, Lionel Stein, Pablo Sittler, el indio, Lito B. Zadik & Co. and others.

Casa Cakchiquel is the home of Radio 5, FM99.1 the local Radio Station in the Atitlan Basin.

Panajachel is also home to one of the oldest art galleries in Central America, La Galeria directly down the street to Rancho Grande.

== International organizations ==
Panajachel is home to many international non-profit organizations, such as Porch de Salomon, Mercado Global, Maya Traditions Foundation, Mayan Families, Thirteen Threads (Oxjalul B'atz'), Friendship Bridge, and Sharing the Dream.

== Gallery ==
Calle Santander, the principal tourist through-way

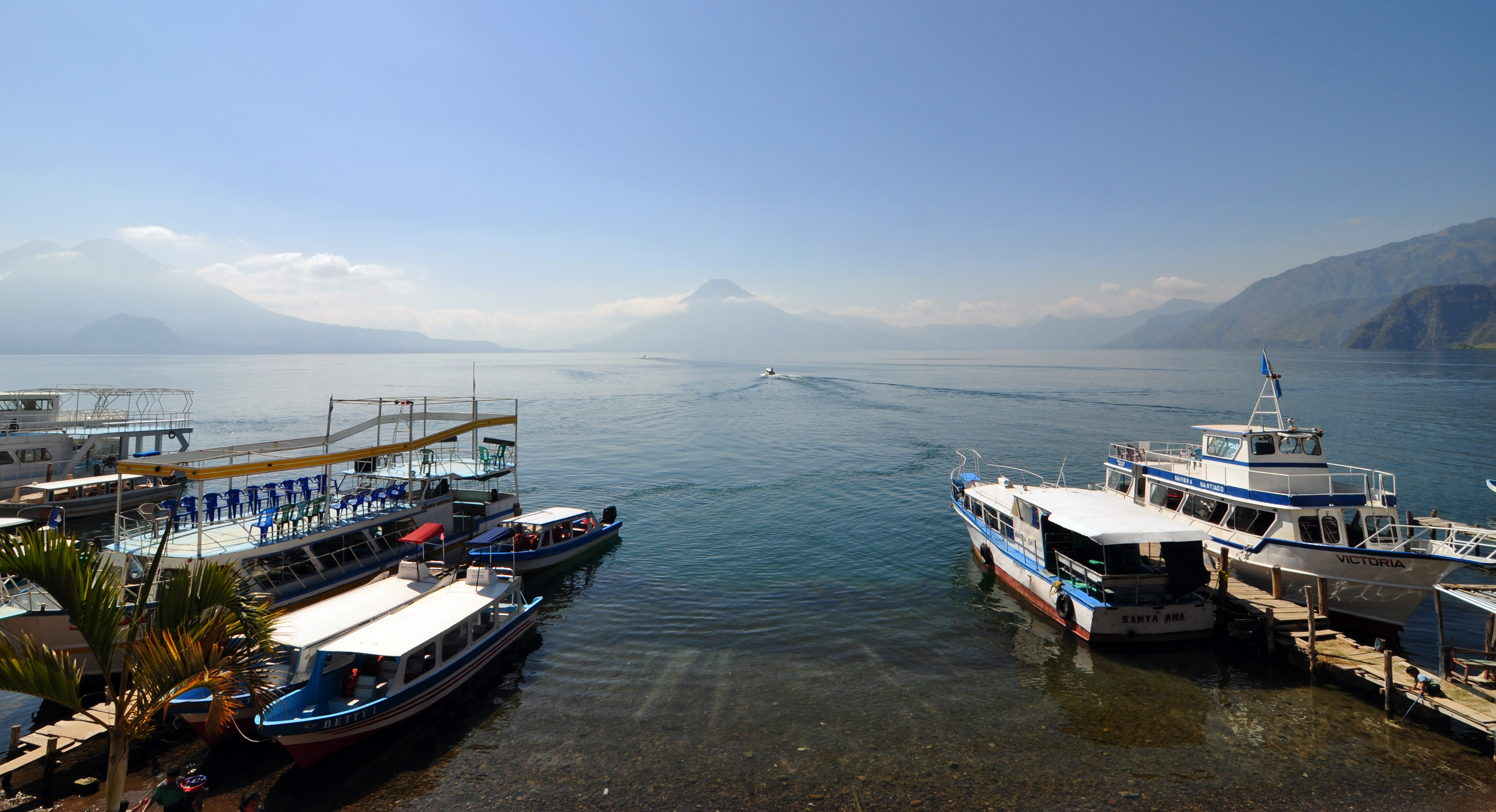
View of Lake Atitlan and the volcanoes

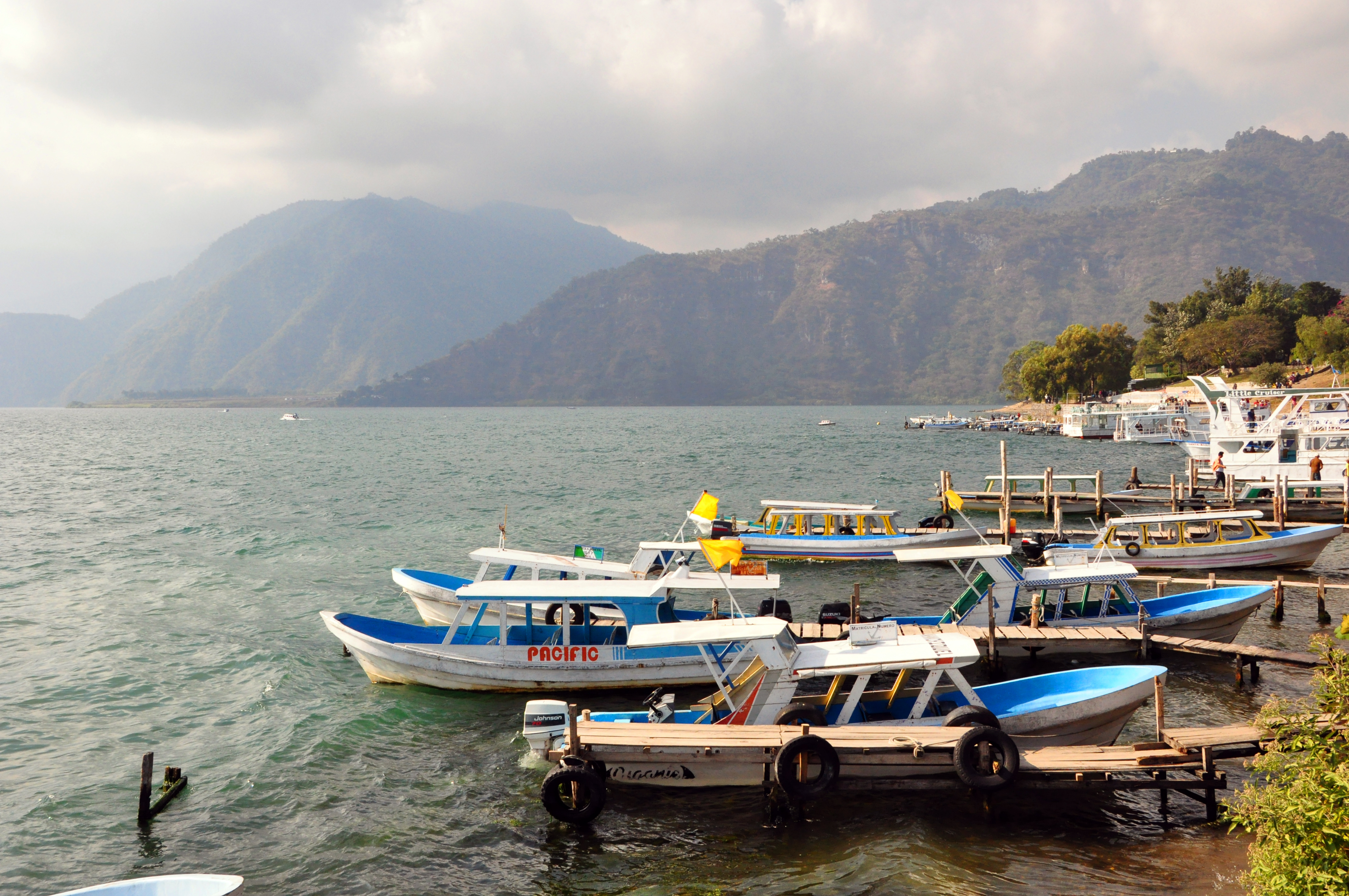
Boats docked in Lake Atitlan

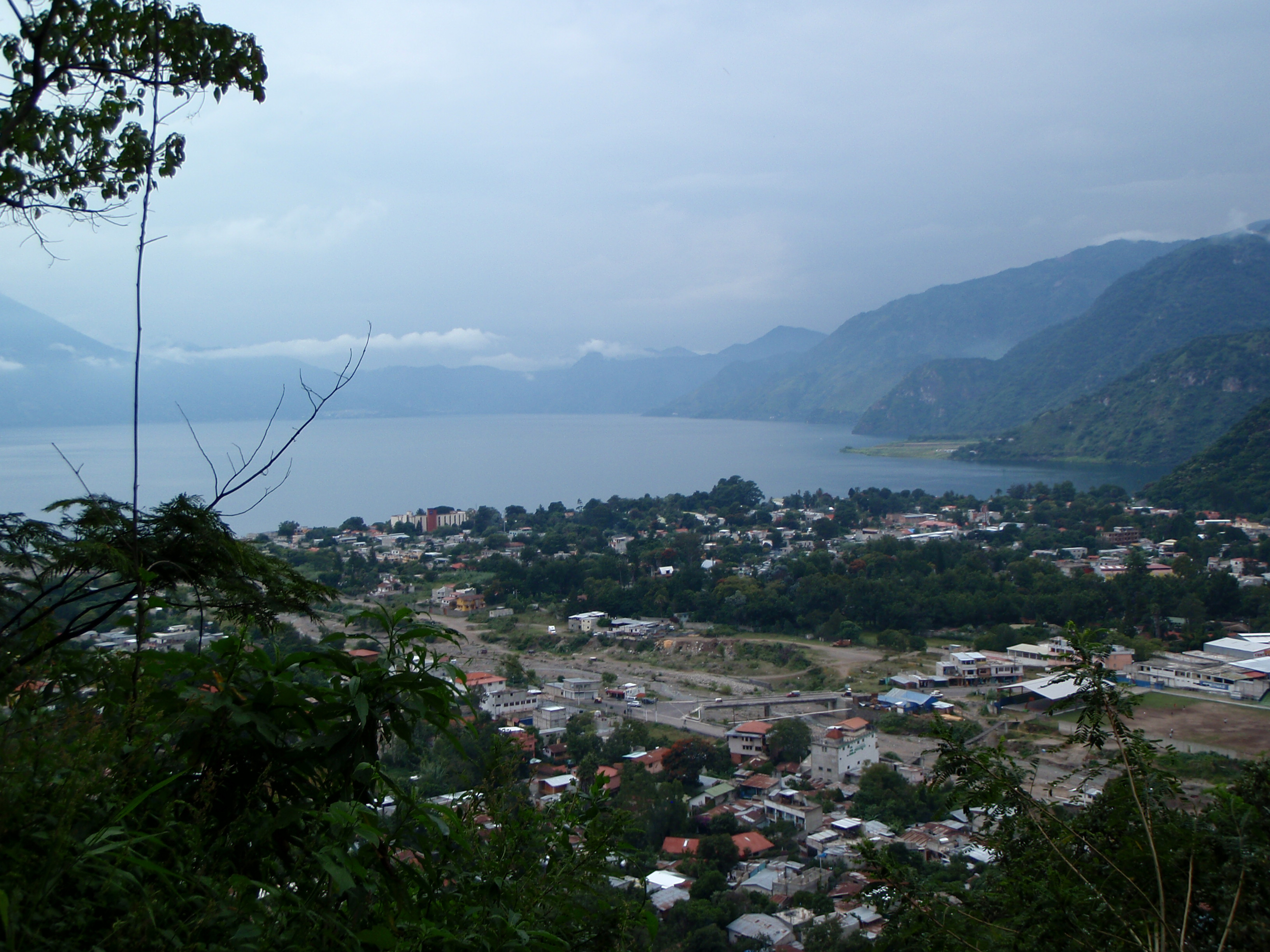
Panajachel on the shore of Lake Atitlan.

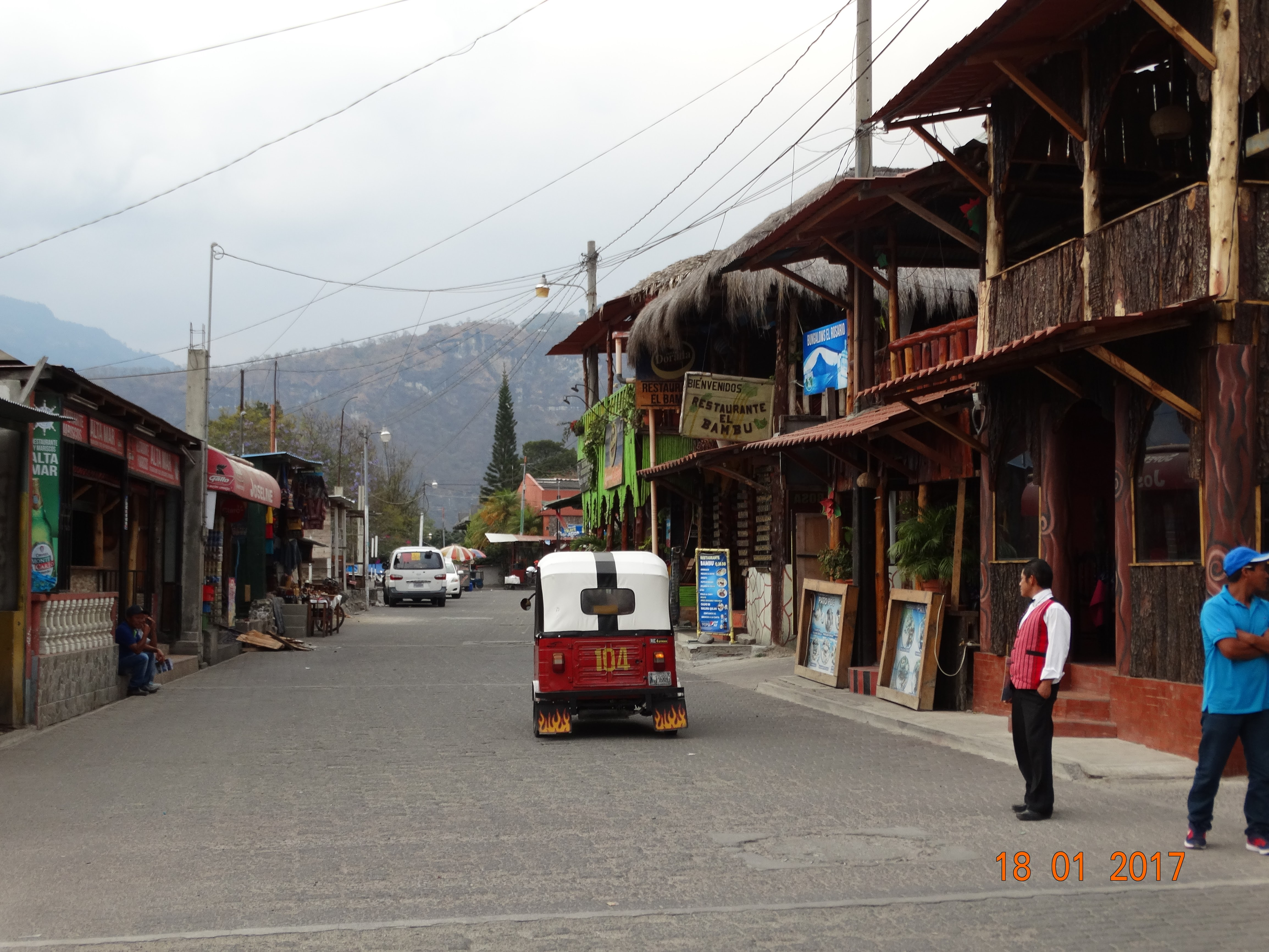
Street in Panajachel

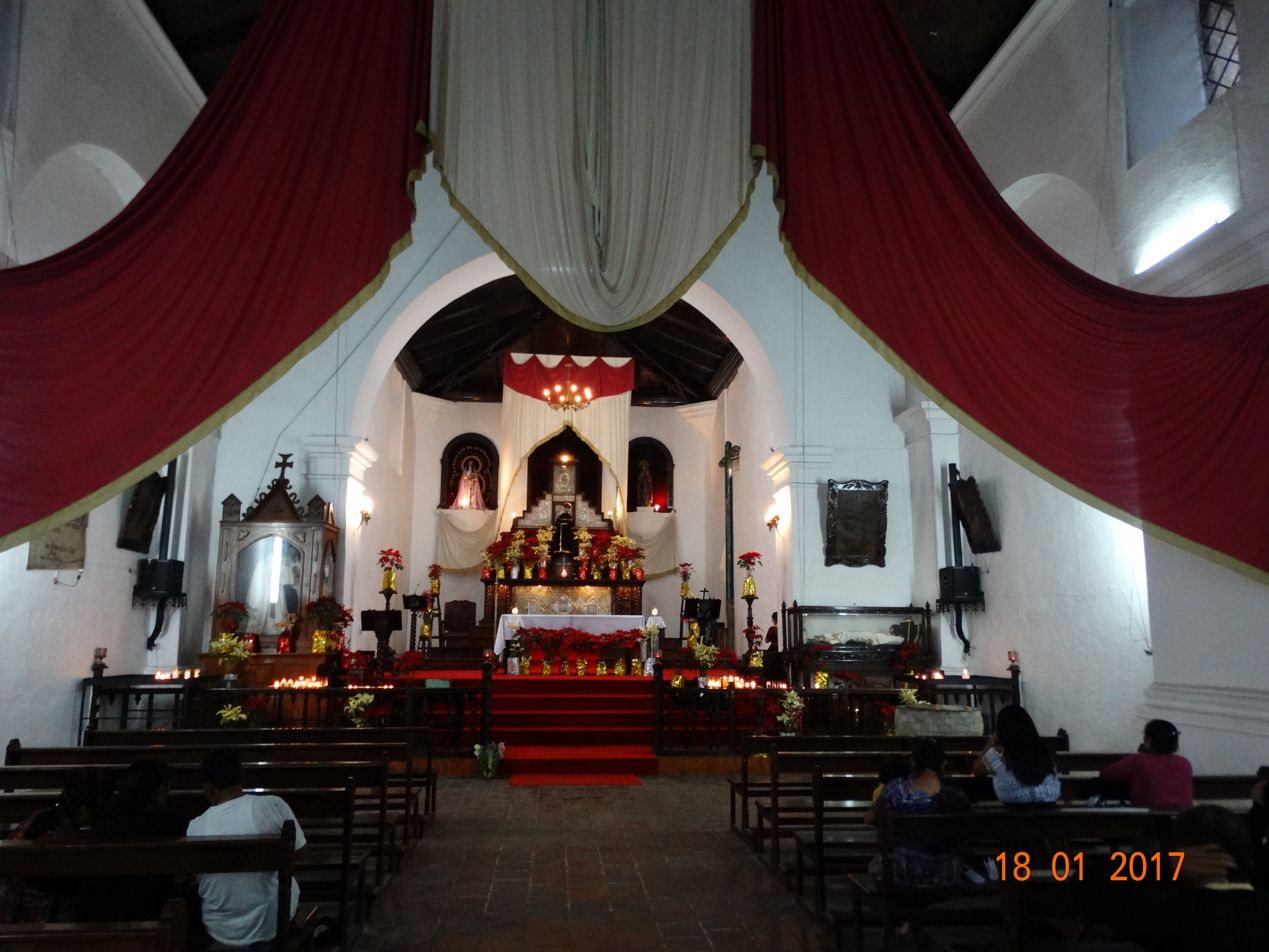
Panajachel church (interior view)

== Climate ==
Panajachel has tropical climate (Köppen: Aw), Very closely bordering on (Köppen: Cwa).

Climate data for Panajachel
Month	Jan	Feb	Mar	Apr	May	Jun	Jul	Aug	Sep	Oct	Nov	Dec	Year
Mean daily maximum °C (°F)	25.6 (78.1)	25.6 (78.1)	26.6 (79.9)	26.1 (79.0)	25.9 (78.6)	23.7 (74.7)	24.8 (76.6)	24.9 (76.8)	24.3 (75.7)	24.6 (76.3)	25.2 (77.4)	25.4 (77.7)	25.2 (77.4)
Daily mean °C (°F)	18.9 (66.0)	18.8 (65.8)	19.7 (67.5)	19.8 (67.6)	20.1 (68.2)	19.1 (66.4)	19.6 (67.3)	19.5 (67.1)	19.1 (66.4)	19.3 (66.7)	19.1 (66.4)	18.7 (65.7)	19.3 (66.8)
Mean daily minimum °C (°F)	12.3 (54.1)	12.0 (53.6)	12.9 (55.2)	13.6 (56.5)	14.3 (57.7)	14.6 (58.3)	14.4 (57.9)	14.1 (57.4)	14.0 (57.2)	14.0 (57.2)	13.0 (55.4)	12.1 (53.8)	13.4 (56.2)
Average precipitation mm (inches)	2 (0.1)	15 (0.6)	15 (0.6)	48 (1.9)	137 (5.4)	355 (14.0)	174 (6.9)	185 (7.3)	328 (12.9)	182 (7.2)	38 (1.5)	11 (0.4)	1,490 (58.8)
Source: Climate-Data.org; Instituto Nacional de Sismología, Vulcanología, Meteorología e Hidrología de Guatemala

== Geographic location ==
It is located at 6 km south of Sololá and 146 km west of Guatemala City.

== See also ==
- Feast of Saint Francis
- La Aurora International Airport
- List of places in Guatemala

== Notes and references ==
=== Bibliography ===
- Cortés y Larraz, Pedro (2001) [1770]. García, Jesús María; Blasco, Julio Martín (eds.). Descripción Geográfico-Moral de la Diócesis de Goathemala. Corpus Hispanorum de Pace. Segunda Serie (in Spanish). Consejo Superior de Investigaciones Científicas. ISBN 9788400080013. ISSN 0589-8056.
- García Añoveros, Jesús (1989). "Las misiones franciscanas de la Mosquitia nicaragüense" (PDF). Actas del III Congreso Internacional sobre los franciscanos en el nuevo mundo (Siglo XVII) (in Spanish). Madrid, Spain: DEIMOS; Universidad Internacional de Andalucía.
- Maudslay, Alfred Percival; Maudslay, Anne Cary (1899). A glimpse at Guatemala, and some notes on the ancient monuments of Central America (PDF). London, UK: John Murray.
