= Rent the Runway =

Online service that provides designer dress and accessory rentals

- Company type: Public
- Traded as: Nasdaq: RENT
- Founded: 2009; 17 years ago
- Headquarters: New York City, U.S.
- Founders: Jennifer Hyman; Jennifer Fleiss
- Key people: Paige Thomas (CEO)
- Industry: E-commerce
- Revenue: ▲$100 Million (2017)
- Employees: 1,800 (2019)
- Website: renttherunway.com

Rent the Runway is an American e-commerce platform that allows users to rent, subscribe, or buy designer apparel and accessories. It was founded in November 2009 by Jennifer Hyman and Jennifer Fleiss and is based in New York City.

== History ==
In 2007, Hyman and Fleiss met as sectionmates at Harvard Business School. They regularly met up to discuss entrepreneurial ideas, one of which was Rent the Runway. After seeing her sister overspend on an expensive new dress for a wedding, Hyman had the idea of offering dress rentals for women for special events. Long term, her plan was to offer women unlimited access to a designer closet they could rent from on-demand. Early on, Hyman and Fleiss pitched the idea to designer Diane von Fürstenberg as a rental service for her brand's website. She was initially uninterested, and suggested that instead they create their own multi-brand retail site. Hyman and Fleiss took her advice, and Fürstenberg signed on as one of the company's first designer partners. In 2009, the company received publicity from an article published in The New York Times. In 2016, the company began offering everyday clothing through a subscription model.

The company has received over $400 million in venture capital from investors including Fidelity, Franklin Templeton, TCV, Bain Capital Ventures, Highland Capital Partners, American Express, and T. Rowe Capital. In 2015, the company suffered negative press after the departure of several executives such as CTO Camille Fournier and Linda Honan (now of BBDO). However, it was reported to have a positive bounce back by the end of 2016 with a Series E venture investment from Fidelity Investments and the launch of new physical retail shops. In 2017, Fleiss left the company to co-found Jetblack, a concierge shopping service. Fleiss remained on the board and Hyman remained as CEO. In March 2019, Rent the Runway received a new round of financing that increased its valuation to the unicorn level of $1 billion.

In September 2023, Rent The Runway profitability began to decline, as sales were reported as failing to meet soaring consumer demand after a disappointing quarter. In October 2023, CreditRiskMonitor reported that Rent the Runway was nearing a potential Chapter 11 bankruptcy filing.

In October 2025, Rent the Runway completed a recapitalization that reduced its outstanding debt to approximately $120 million, extended its maturity to 2029, and raised new capital through a combination of equity conversion and investor funding. The transaction included participation from Aranda Principal Strategies, STORY3 Capital Partners, and Nexus Capital Management, alongside a rights offering that generated an additional $12.5 million in proceeds.

In September 2026, Rent the Runway appointed Paige Thomas as chief executive officer, succeeding interim CEO Teri Bariquit, who became non-executive chair of the board. Thomas had joined the company as chief commercial officer earlier that year after previously serving as president and CEO of Saks Off 5th.

== Business model ==
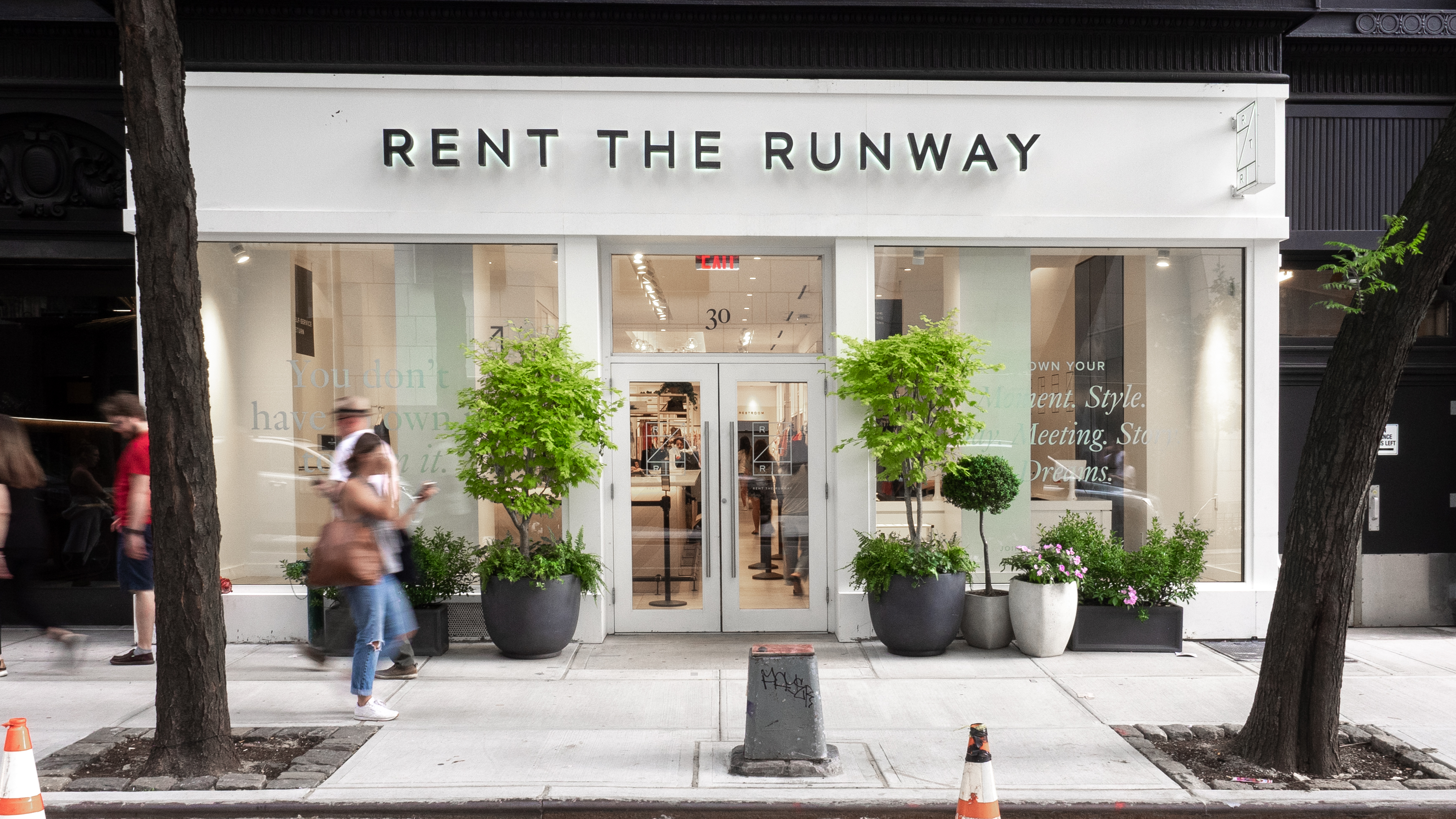
First Physical Location in NYC

The company offers clothes from over 700 designers, in sizes ranging from 00 to 22. In addition to garments for events, the company also rents everyday clothing, children's clothing, ski apparel, home décor, and accessories, including jewelry and handbags. The company offers several subscription plans at varying prices, that can be customized. According to the company, as of 2019 subscriptions account for 75% of its business.

Customers can also rent clothes for a 4- or 8-day period without signing up for a subscription as part of the company's Reserve program. Each rental includes a back-up size at no additional cost to ensure it fits. Customers can get a second style for an additional fee. Rental prices include the dry cleaning and care of the garments. In 2021, the company began allowing anyone to buy items secondhand from its site without a membership. Subscribers have had the option to buy items they rented since 2016.

Rent the Runway had physical locations in New York City, Washington, D.C., Chicago, San Francisco, and Los Angeles, where customers could work with a personal stylist, and either take items directly with them or book dresses and accessories for future events. In August 2020, the company announced it would be closing all five of its retail locations, in order to focus on digital subscriptions, and would be adding more drop box locations.

According to the company, it has the biggest dry cleaning operation in the United States and possibly the world, processing 2,000 items per hour (as of 2018). The company has distribution warehouses in Secaucus, New Jersey, and Arlington, Texas.

In September 2019, Rent the Runway experienced an 11-day operational glitch and temporarily stopped accepting new customers. The company resumed regular operations on October 15, 2019, after implementing system upgrades.

== Awards and honors ==
Rent the Runway was named by Time magazine as one of the 50 best websites of the year in 2010. Four years later, the New York State Society for Human Resource Management honored Rent the Runway as one of the best companies to work for in the state. In 2018, Fast Company recognized RTR Unlimited as a World Changing Idea.

The company was also named on CNBC's Disruptor 50 list in 2013, 2014, 2015, 2018 and 2019. The company was named one of Fast Company's Most Innovative Companies in 2011, 2015, 2018 and 2019.

In 2019, Time recognized Hyman as one of their 100 Most Influential People. The firm and Hyman were named one of the 12 Most Disruptive Names in Business in 2013 by Forbes, and Hyman was included on Fortune’s Trailblazers list of individuals changing the face of business in 2013. Both Hyman and co-founder Fleiss have been named to Inc. Magazine’s “30 Under 30,” Fortune’s “40 Under 40,” Fast Company’s “Most Influential Women in Technology,” Fashion Group International’s 14th annual Rising Stars in Retail, Forbes' "Women Entrepreneurs to Watch", and The Business Journal 2016 Upstart 100 Class of Creatives.
