= Adolfo Biener =

German photographer

Adolfo Amandus Wilhelm Charles Biener; (also Adolpho) September 30, 1873 - November 14, 1939, was a German born photographer and post card publisher.

== Life ==
His father was Johann August Detlev Biener and his mother was Johanna Sophie Marie Noha. In 1899 he married German born Luisa Adela Mina Kraft in Guatemala. He was working in Guatemala from around 1915 until 1930's. He also did work in Mexico. He produced color cards and photographs especially in the 1920s. He hand-colored a master copy using an underdeveloped black and white image. He then printed the colored photograph. His work has been said to be very similar in subject and style to Alberto Valdeveallano. Many photos depicts archaeological sites, earthquakes and portraits. He offered photo processing and photographic equipment and supplies from Germany but also from the United States. He also published tourist booklets with postcards. Those contained 12 postcards that could be detached and mailed. In 1933 he travelled to New York with his son Paul and he died in 1939 in Hamburg.

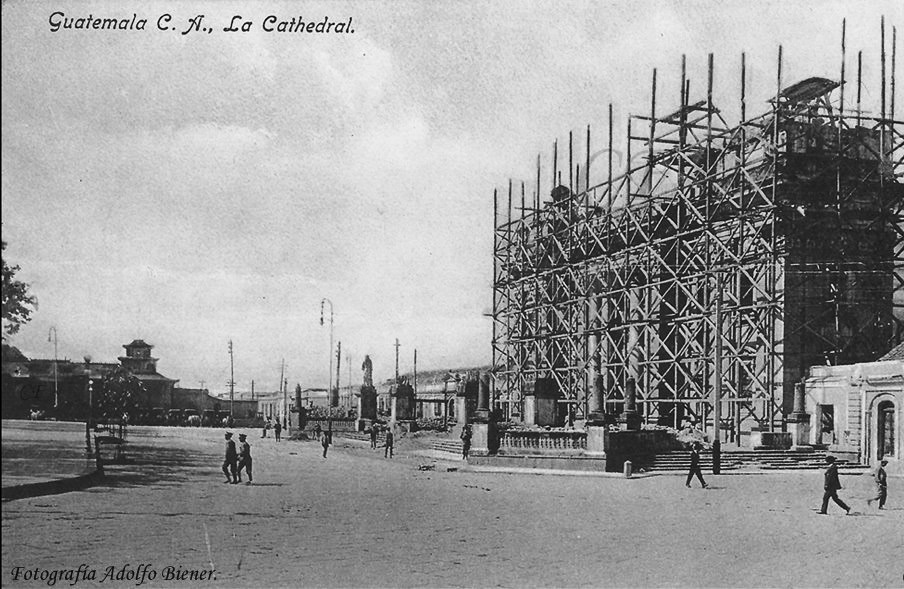
Cathedral of Guatemala City under construction 1923.

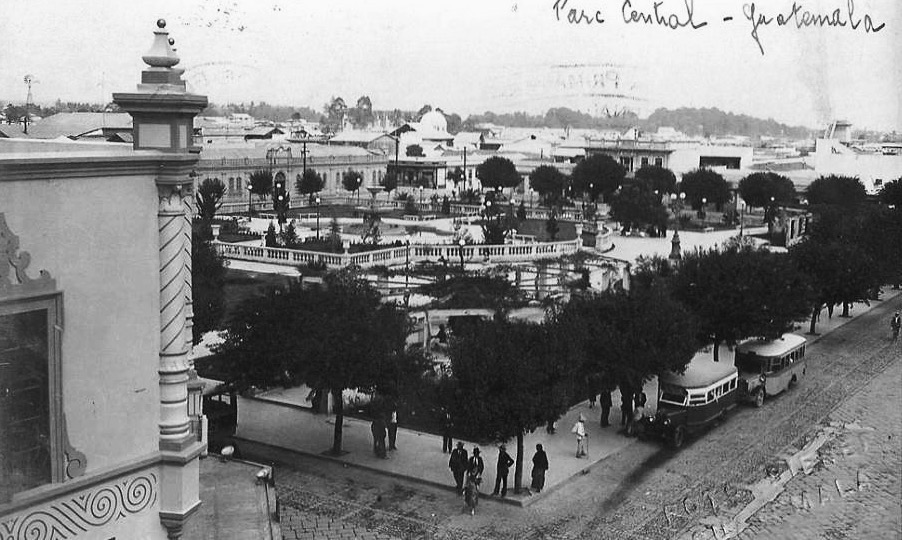
Guatemala City, 1930.
