= Jennifer Fleiss =

American businessman

- Born: New York City, New York, U.S.
- Education: Yale University (BA), Harvard University (MBA)
- Occupations: Co-Founder/Head of Business Development, Rent the Runway

Jennifer Fleiss is an American businessperson and co-founder of Rent the Runway, a company focused on the renting of high-end clothing and accessories.

== Early life and education ==
Fleiss grew up in New York City. She graduated cum laude from Yale University with a BA in political science in 2005. She later attended Harvard Business School, where she met the future co-founder of Rent the Runway, Jennifer Hyman, and graduated with an MBA in 2009.

== Career ==
Fleiss co-founded Rent the Runway with Jennifer Hyman in 2008. She served as head of business development and as a member of the firm's board of directors. She assisted with company-wide infrastructure, project planning, and logistical decisions.

Fleiss started her career crafting long-term company strategy in the Strategic Planning Group at Morgan Stanley. She then moved on to Lehman Brothers’ Asset Management Group, where she was responsible for analyzing business growth opportunities through acquisitions, international expansion, and new product strategies.

In 2017, Fleiss left Rent the Runway to co-founded Jetblack, a text-based concierge shopping service, with Mark Lore, also the co-founder of Jet.com.

In 2021, Fleiss joined Volition Capital.

== Awards and honors ==
Fleiss has received various honors and recognitions, including Fortune’s “40 Under 40” and “Most Powerful Women Entrepreneurs”; Forbes’s “Disruptors 2013”; Inc.’s “30 Under 30”; Fast Company’s “Most Influential Women in Technology”; Ernst & Young’s “Entrepreneur of the Year” New York Area Regional finalist; and Fashionista.com's “Most Influential People in New York Fashion.”
