= Jennifer Hyman =

American businesswoman

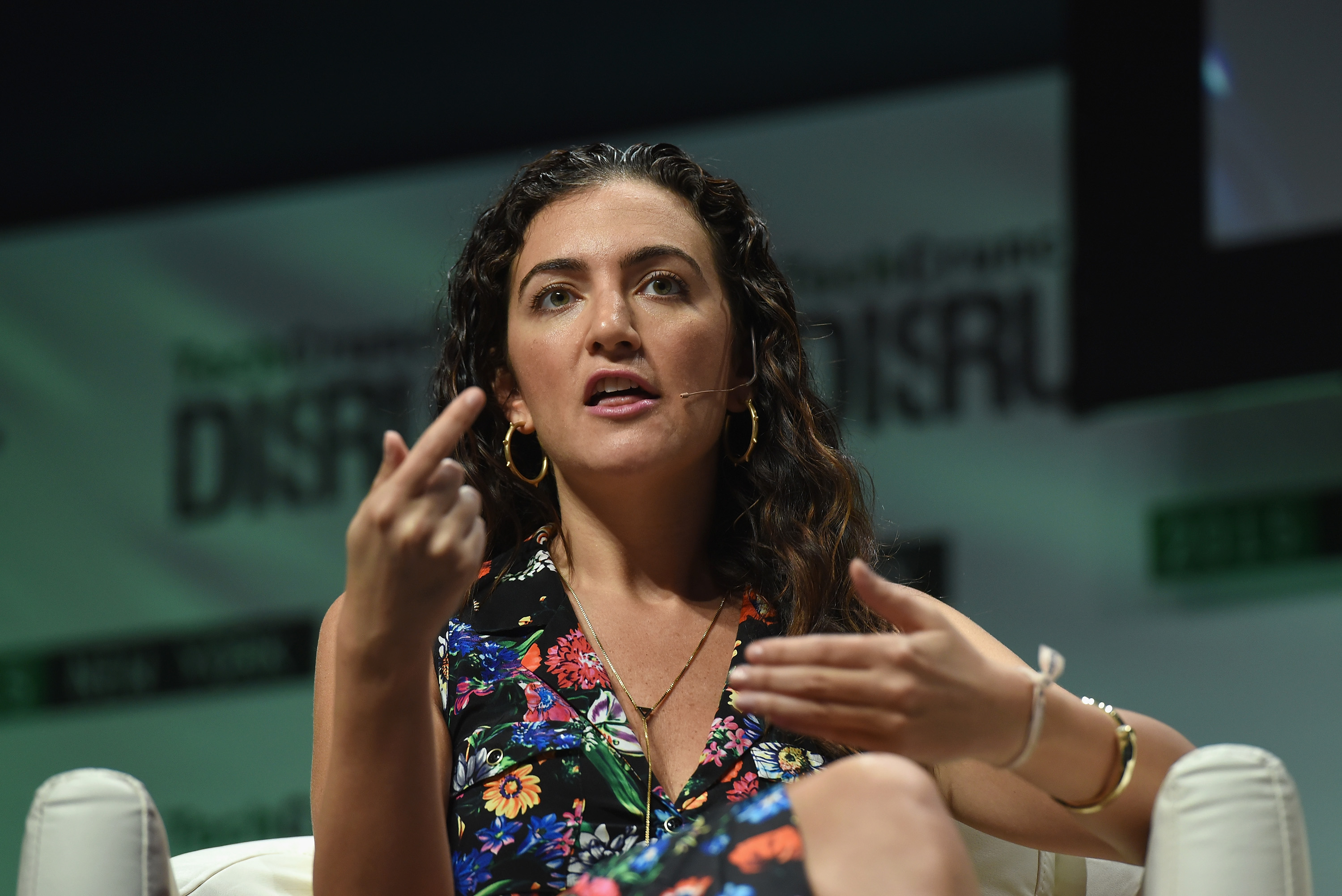
- Hyman (2015)
- Born: August 24, 1980 (age 46)
- Education: Harvard University (BA, MBA)
- Occupation: Businesswoman

Jennifer Hyman is an American businesswoman who is the co-founder and former chief executive officer (CEO) of Rent the Runway, a company focused on the renting of high-end clothing and accessories.

== Early life and education ==
Hyman grew up in New Rochelle, New York, and attended New Rochelle High School. She received her BA in social sciences from Harvard University in 2002.

Hyman later attended Harvard Business School, where she met co-founder of Rent the Runway Jennifer Fleiss, and graduated with an MBA in 2009.

== Career ==
In November 2008, Hyman got the idea for Rent the Runway after witnessing her sister spend thousands of dollars on a dress for a wedding, only to wear it once. Hyman co-founded Rent the Runway in 2009. She was the 30th woman in history to take their company public and the first company to go public with a female founder/CEO, COO, and CFO.

In May 2026, Hyman stepped down from her position as CEO of Rent the Runway.

Prior to the founding of Rent the Runway, Hyman ran an online advertising sales team for weddingchannel.com and worked as an in-house entrepreneur for the Starwood Hotel where she was responsible for creating the hotel’s first wedding business. Following that, she served as the director of business development for IMG’s fashion division.

=== Appearances ===
Hyman participates in national conferences and panel discussions regarding topics covering the economy, women in business, and company culture. Some of her past speaking engagements include NRF Foundation's "Retail’s Big Show" WWD's Digital Forum and the 99U Conference.

Hyman has spoken out publicly against sexual harassment in the tech industry and went public with her own experience on CNBC's Squawk Alley in July 2017.

Hyman has served on the Board of Directors of the Estée Lauder Companies since 2018. In July 2026, Hyman announced that she would resign her position on the company's board on November 16, 2026. Hyman also serves on the Women.nyc Advisory Board.

== Personal life ==
Hyman met her husband, Benjamin Stauffer, a television and film editor, on the dating app Hinge. The couple married in January 2018.

== Awards and recognition ==
- Fortune magazine's 40 Under 40 in 2012
- Time magazine's 100 Most Influential People of 2019
- People Magazine's 2020 Women Changing the World
