= Gift registry =

A gift registry is a particular type of wish list in Western countries.

== Description ==
Typically, when a recipient compiles a list of items they wish to receive and then distributes it to family and friends, they have created a wish list. A registry, on the other hand, is made public, and the retailer or registry system provider removes items from the list as they are purchased. Registry managers will often not divulge who has purchased the registered items. In the United Kingdom, a gift registry is frequently referred to as a "gift list" and has become an established part of British weddings, with the service often provided by most department stores.

== Retailer-specific versus multiple retailers ==
Traditionally, registries were limited to the stock of a given retailer, which maintained the list for the registrant and ensured that items were removed from the list as they were purchased.

However, online gift registries that are not specific to any retailer have become an increasingly popular alternative to retailer-specific registries, as the former offers more flexible means of adding gifts and coordinating purchases, as well as social networking capabilities. In 2004, North American shopping centers (notably Galleria Edina) began to extend this concept by offering registries that had access to multiple shops within individual centers.

== Goals ==
A managed registry system has several goals:

1. It facilitates communication between gift givers and receivers. Recipients can compile a gift registry and make it available to anyone who will present them with a gift. Gift givers can then be certain they are purchasing items the receiver will appreciate.
2. An efficiently-managed registry can prevent gift givers from giving duplicating gifts. To accomplish this, the retailer should remove each item from the registry as it is purchased.
3. The registry process should allow gift purchasers to be discreet about what they have bought. This is so the gift's recipient will not know who purchased which items until they are surprised at the time of gift giving.
4. The registry system should benefit the retailer by bringing customers to their store or website, to purchase products the merchant carries.
5. The store is often able to deliver all of the gifts to the recipients at a mutually convenient time before or after the event, for the convenience of both the givers and the recipient.

== Examples ==
Gift registries are often used for a variety of occasions, such as anniversaries, baby showers, birthdays, civil ceremonies, graduations, and housewarming parties.

- For example, engaged couples use a bridal registry to indicate the pattern(s) and item(s) they desire for such product lines as china and silverware, so gift-givers will know which items to buy as wedding gifts.
- Similarly, those purchasing a new home may register the furniture and domestic items, such as appliances, they desire for their housewarming.
