= History of anthropology by country =

Anthropology is the study of various aspects of humans within past and present societies. This study is practiced in multiple countries, each of whom has their own history of how anthropology has developed in their respective countries.

== Latin America ==
Anthropology in Latin America is a well-established discipline that has existed for over 100 years. The countries that are summarized in this section include Mexico, Brazil, Argentina, the Andean region, Costa Rica, and Colombia. For the moment, not included are discussions of anthropology (or ethnology) in Cuba, the Dominican Republic, or Haiti. Latin America anthropologists established their discipline in conjunction with American and European anthropologists, and revised their disciplines to study cultural phenomena through their own perspectives, independent of American and European thought.

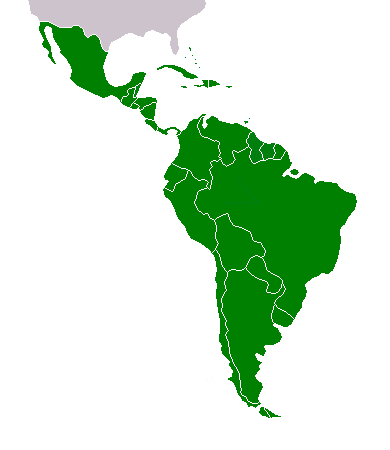
Latin America and the Caribbean

=== Andes ===
Andean anthropology's roots began during the turn of the 20th century, containing social movements between two groups in Peru, and from academia within the United States. The mestizo (non-native) and indigenous intellectuals known as indigenistas competed for political and intellectual space and recognition in Peru. Indigenous intellectuals advocated for interculturalidad, where indigenous thought could occupy Peruvian society as its own entity and not become blended as a singular national identity that the mestizaje proposed.

The mestizaje perspective sought to modernize Peru and model their society similar to the United States. José María Arguedas was a writer and ethnographer in Peru, who classified himself as an indigenous intellectual that challenged Western thought and ideology. John Victor Murra, an anthropologist teaching in the United States collaborated with Arguedas. Their collaboration stemmed from Murra's travels in 1952 to the Latin American region when he was working under the anthropologist Sidney Mintz as a PhD student. Indigenistas were active in social and political movements in Latin America and collaborated with people inside of the United States, but still sought to be independent from Western thought.

The logo of the American Anthropological Association

In 1936, the American Anthropological Association initiated studies in Latin America on how to incorporate indigenous people in Latin American society, termed acculturation studies, and in 1935, the Social Science Research Council, the American Council of Learned Societies, and the Committee on Latin American studies worked to benefit the interests of the United States. The Peruvian government funded anthropological institutions beginning in the 1940s, and the establishment of the Instiuto de Etnologia y Arqueologia and a Peruvian sector in the Instituto Indigneista Interamericano followed. By the 1960s Peruvian governmental funding decreased, and became reliant upon the United States for funding. The indigenous incorporation into the goal of a singular society was termed cholification by the Peruvian sociologist Anibal Quijano. In the 1990s during the Neo-liberal era, indigenous thought became more recognized with political conflicts in the Andean region, and interculturalidad was pursued again for Andean states to recognize the diversity of the people that occupied them.

=== Brazil ===
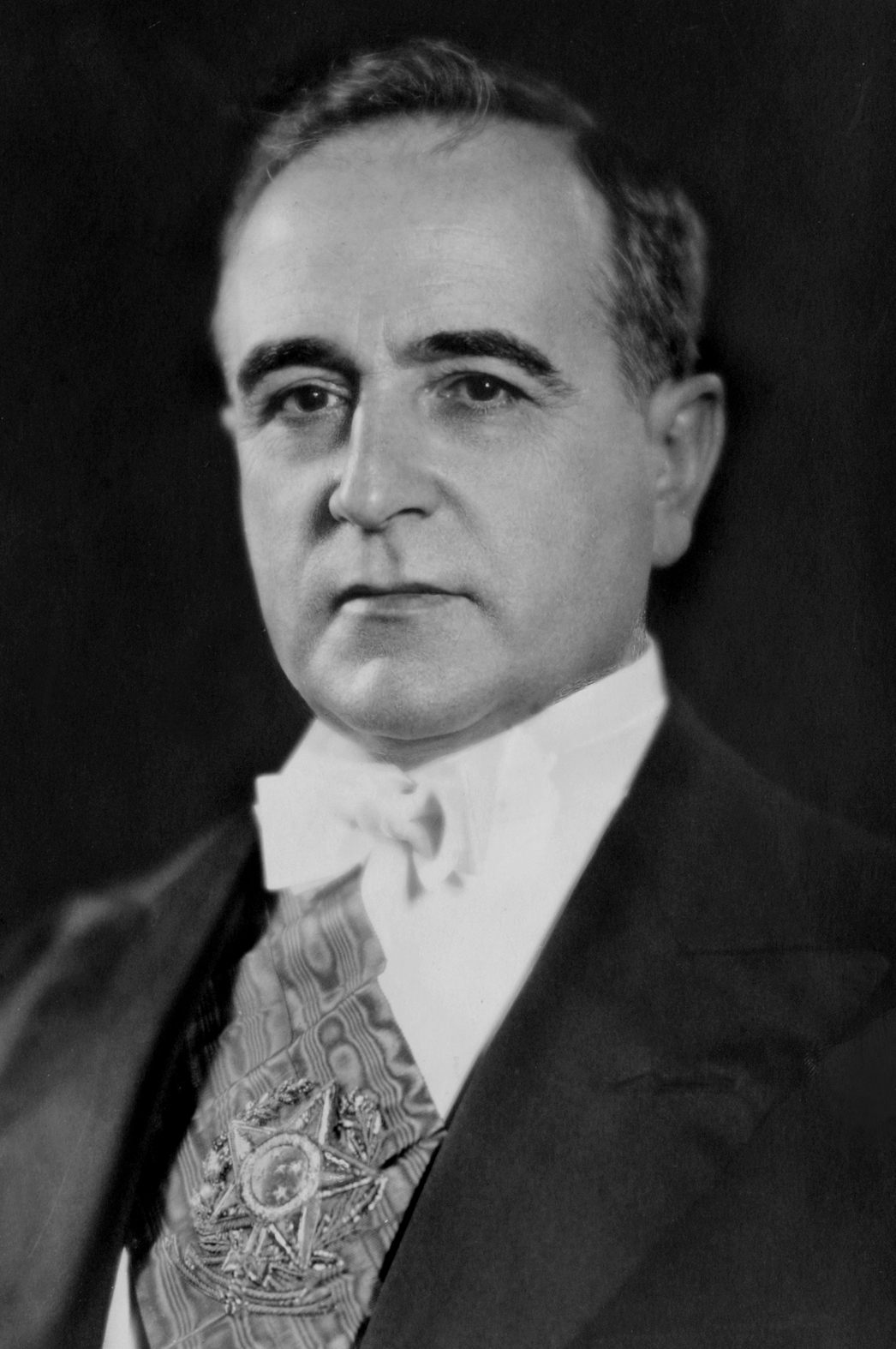
Getúlio Vargas (1930)

Anthropology in Brazil was institutionalized in 1930 at the beginning of the Vargas Era. Later during the 1950s and 1960s, Brazil was experiencing political authoritarianism. As a result, anthropology began to address inter-ethnic friction. In the 1970s anthropologists began to consider nearby urban studies as a topic of research. The 1980s kicked off a more modern type of anthropology where anthropologists began to look at themselves as “the other”. Brazil did not have an issue of alterity or exoticism, because it existed within its own borders. Brazil began to value exoticism and viewed it as the acknowledgement of cultural diversity according to Mariza Peirano. In general, the overall current goal for Brazilian anthropology was to better the future for modernization by enlightening modern political elite and identifying relevant topics for investigation. Some of Brazil's main anthropological institutions are the University of Brazil, Universidade Federal do Rio de Janeiro, and the Brazilian Association of Anthropology.

=== Colombia ===
Anthropology in Colombia was institutionalized during the mid-1940s. Between the 1950s-70's, Colombian anthropologists sought to integrate into national society and began to deal with terms like culture, integration, and assimilation. However, during the 1970s, this early understanding of anthropology was opposed and anthropologists began to confront terms such as national integration because they felt it was loaded with other issues like racial supremacy. Emerging social movements encouraged this new way of thinking because it recognized the rights of peasant and ethnic populations as well as the influence of Marxism. Anthropologists continued this way of thinking through the 1980s although a larger influence from militant anthropology became apparent. By militant anthropology, Myriam Jimeno refers to anthropologists who often debate and participate, but write very little. The goal of this type of anthropology was to alter the symbols of national identity and to accompany new ethnic movements in finding representation. Anthropologists and ethnic groups aimed to challenge the way indigenous groups were being ostracized by cultural hegemony. Later on in 1991, Colombia underwent a process of constitutional reform and development in attempt to recognize more cultural and ethnic rights. Some of its current most influential institutions are the Colombian Institute of Anthropology and History, the Colombian National University, and the National Institute of Ethnology.

=== Costa Rica ===
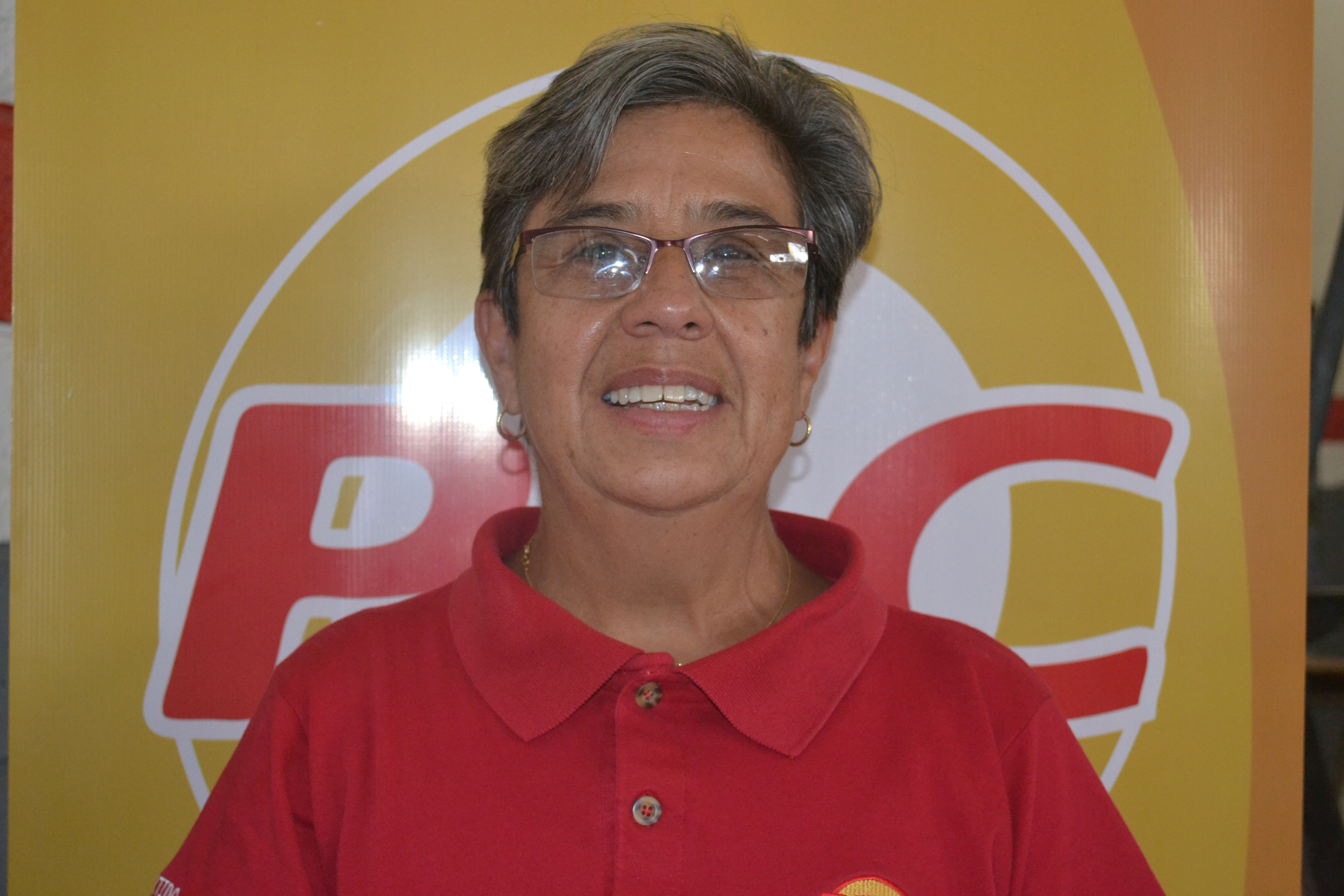
Presidenta del Partido Acción Ciudadana Margarita Bolaños Arquín

Costa Rican anthropology was institutionalized in 1967 under political influence. According to Margarita Bolaños Arquín, increasing notions of nationalism and anti imperialism led to the institutionalization of social sciences in Costa Rica. During the 1960s, around the time of institutionalization, social scientists' primary focus was on the birth and implications of social movements, as well as the consequences of modernization in rural areas. Later, French Structural Marxism influenced the social sciences to take an interest in the study of class structures. Over time, anthropology in Costa Rica was highly criticized in its struggle to find its identity. Caught in a sort of balancing act between western and Latin American practice, anthropology in Costa Rica eventually learned to take the criticisms of other anthropologies and made a name for itself with a focus on gender studies, identity studies, and developmental problems. To legitimize their discipline, anthropology contributed to other sciences such as linguistics, agriculture, and psychology. However, during the 1980s Costa Rica endured a recession, and anthropological institutions were under threat. During this time, globalization was becoming increasingly popular and while during the recession of the 1980s Costa Rica was not seen as a power player, at the start of the 1990s, the country could now participate in ways that were productive. It was not until around the 1990s that anthropologists regained the opportunity to research and, after such political and economic turmoil, there was much to question. Throughout the 1990s the focus of anthropology and other disciplines such as sociology continued to research in rural areas but shifted their research to the survival of the poor during tough economic times.

== Cuba ==
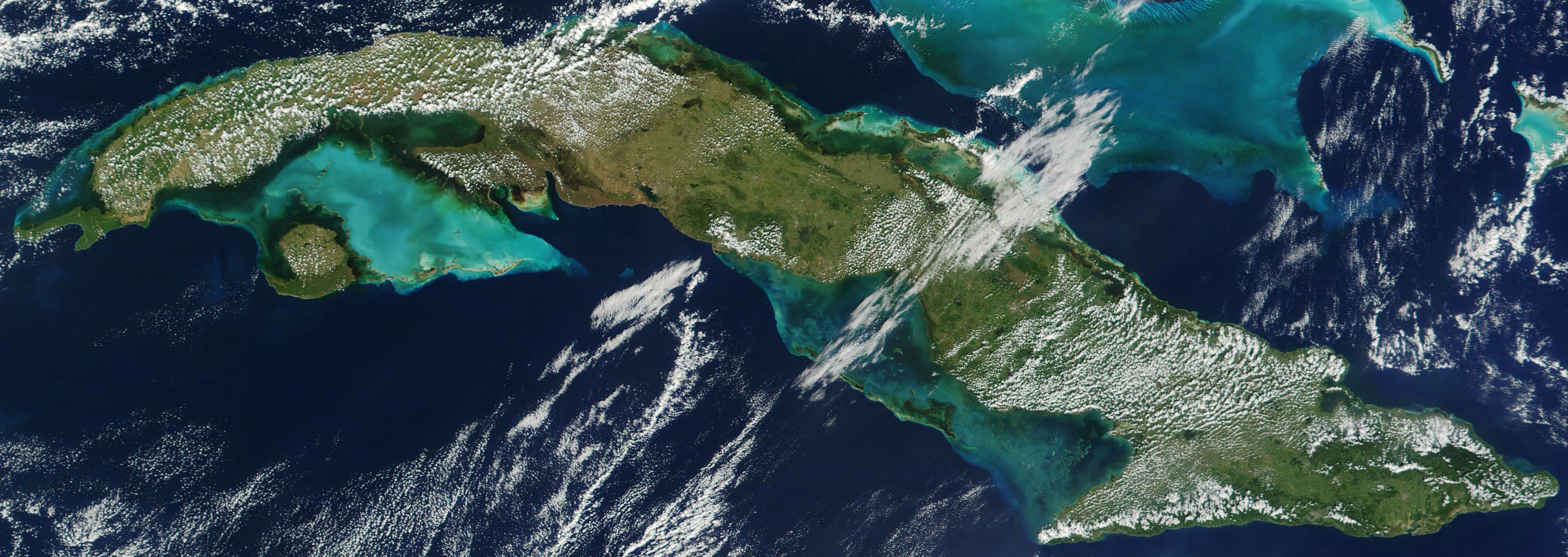
A satellite image of Cuba.

Anthropology in Cuba, and in many of the Greater Antilles, had its earliest roots in the accounts of the chroniclers, such as Cristóbal Colón and Fray Bartolomé de las Casas. In these accounts important valuable ethnographic data about the indigenous Taíno society was stored. However, it was not until 1877 that anthropology was institutionalized. This happened in Habana where the Anthropological Society of the Island of Cuba was created, it dissolved later due to the resumption of independence struggles. The institutionalization was influenced by Charles Darwin's theory on evolution.

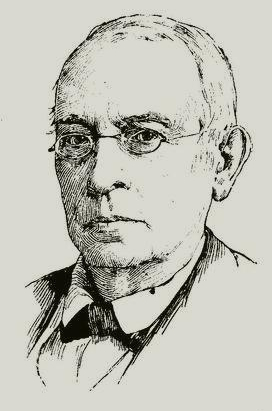
Felipe Poey

In 1899, formal teaching of anthropology began, being focused on physical and biological anthropology. An important figure for physical anthropology is Felipe Poey; he kickstarted it with the study of human remains found on the Island. Following the Cuban Revolution, in 1962 anthropology departments started being created in places like the School of Biological Sciences of the University of Havana and the Academy of Sciences of Cuba. As of 1990 Cuban anthropology has adopted and applied methods from the anthropologies of other countries, like Germany, France, and others. Fernando Ortiz is also an important figure to anthropology in Cuba, given that he spearheaded the sociocultural side of anthropology with his studies on Afro-Cuban culture.

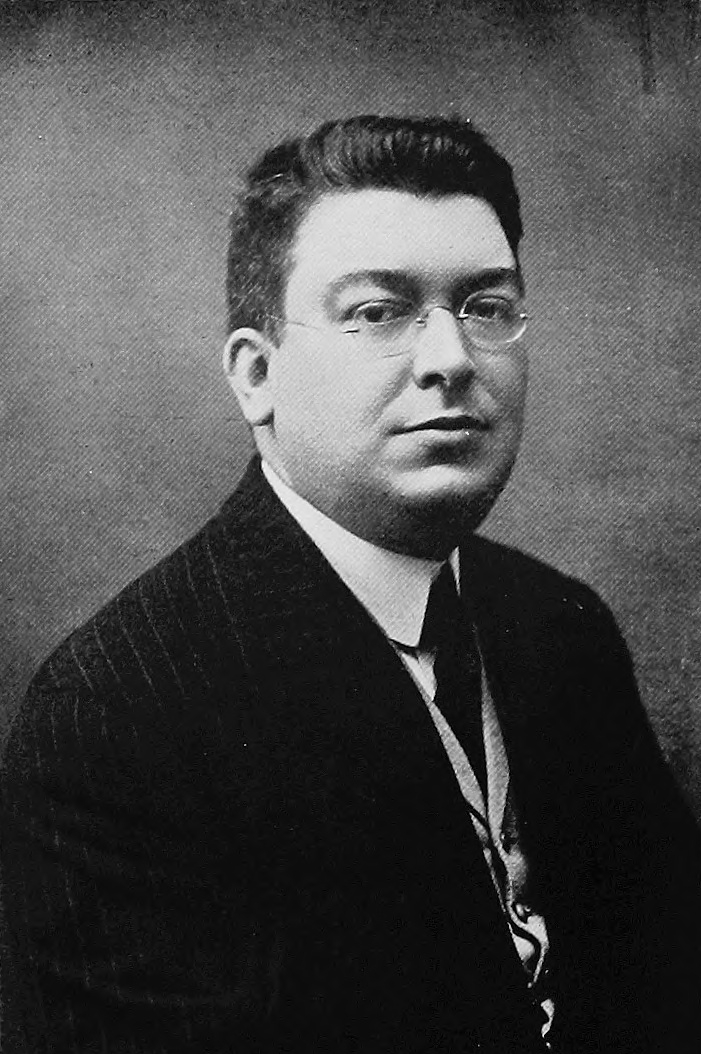
Fernando Ortiz

Another important figure of Cuban anthropology is Lydia Cabrera. Cabrera was known for her Afro-Cuban folklore studies. Despite all three important figures not having formal anthropological training, because of their works, they are still considered pioneers of the field. Anthropology in Cuba was primarily dedicated to physical anthropology, with the purpose of scientifically legitimizing the racial hierarchies and population policies of the time.

=== Mexico ===
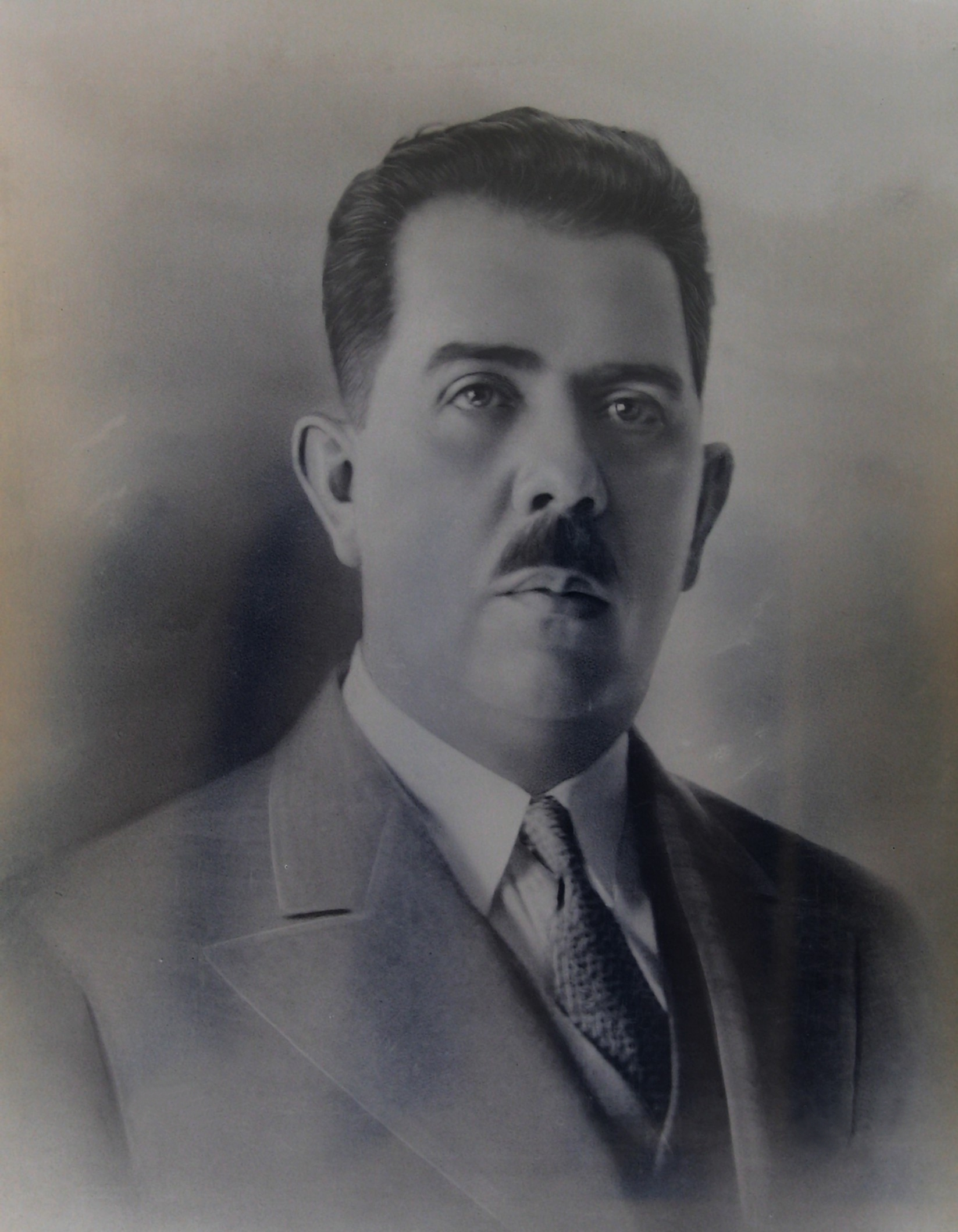
President Lazaro Cardenas, in office 1934-1940

Manuel Gamio, the first Mexican anthropologist, earned his PhD in 1921, having studied under Franz Boas. The first anthropology department was established in 1938. Indigenous population studies known as indigenism, are an integral part of Mexican anthropology, and became popular during the presidency of Lázaro Cardenas, serving from 1934 to 1940. The National Institute of Anthropology and History was established by President Lázaro Cárdenas in 1939, and remains a prominent place of anthropological study in Latin America. The nation-building interests of incorporating the indigenous population into the Mexican state also led to the establishment of the Inter-American Indian Institute in 1942, in Mexico City, along with the establishment of the academic journal, America Indígena. Marxist theory was predominantly used to analyze social phenomena, and was combined with social evolution theory that viewed Mexico in three historical time phases: pre-Hispanic, Colonial, and Modern.

In the 1970s, Gonzalo Aguirre Beltrán, an anthropologist who was formerly a medical doctor worked for the federal government and promoted critical anthropology in Mexico that used Marxist theory and rejected imperialistic practices from the United States. Mexico's urban populations began to increase in the 1970s, which became another topic of study for anthropologists. In the 1980s, Gramscian Marxism became the theoretical center, and studies included rural and urban populations, and labor. Institutions of anthropology have continued to increase since the 1980s, offering undergraduate and graduate degrees. Neo-liberal market transformations in the 1990s have affected anthropological training presently, as students may find careers not only in the universities, but non-governmental organizations.

== Pacific ==
The University of the South Pacific (USP) has to date not offered a study program in anthropology. The University of Papua New Guinea (UPNG) offers a study program in anthropology.

== Asia ==
Asia includes the countries China, Japan, Philippines, and Siberia. Anthropology in Asia has been influenced by Western anthropological ideologies through colonial contact, historically. While the discipline of anthropology is historically built from nation-building and colonization from core countries, language and publishing barriers, funding opportunities and political status all influence the structure of anthropological research in each Asian country. Anthropology in the social and cultural perspective have not always had a strong tradition in Asian anthropology, but ethnography, ethnology, and folklore often have dominant roots within the discipline.

=== China ===
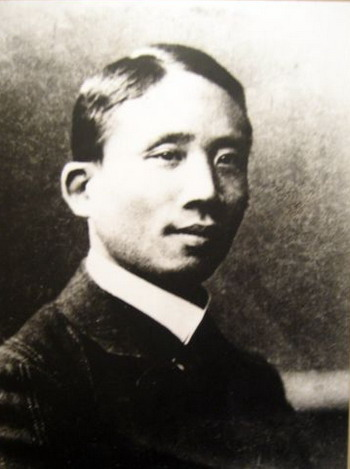
Cai Yuanpei, the father of anthropology in China

Chinese anthropology was founded by scholar Cai Yuanpei. Cai Yuanpei was a scholar educated at the University of Leipzig, and he brought both Western influence and standardization into the discipline of anthropology in China. The first department of anthropology was founded in 1928 with Cai Yuanpei's creation of Academia Sinica in Beijing. At Academia Sinica, physical anthropology and archaeology held focus.

Franz Boas also brought Western influence to China, and British functionalism would make a lasting impact on Chinese anthropology. In addition to Cai Yuanpei, Wu Wenzao was one of the most influential proponents of Western-influenced anthropology, and he took classes under Ruth Benedict (one of Boas’ students that would be influential in the field of anthropology on her own overall). Wu began teaching at Yenjing University in 1929, where he would influence students such as Fei Xiaotong and Lin Yaohua, who would go on to be important in the scene of Chinese anthropology. Chinese Ethnological Association created in 1934, but its progress was halted by China's involvement in World War II in 1937.

World War II pushed back the institutional development of anthropology in China until the late 1940s. With this revitalization, Chinese anthropologists began to look inwards at themselves for subjects of study. This inward focus led anthropologists of the time to attempt to use anthropology to better Chinese society. 1940-late 1950s was a time of Soviet influence in China, followed by 1957-1977 and Mao Zedong’s era of the People's Republic of China. During this time, Maoist aims supplemented ethnology and Chinese national identity creation.

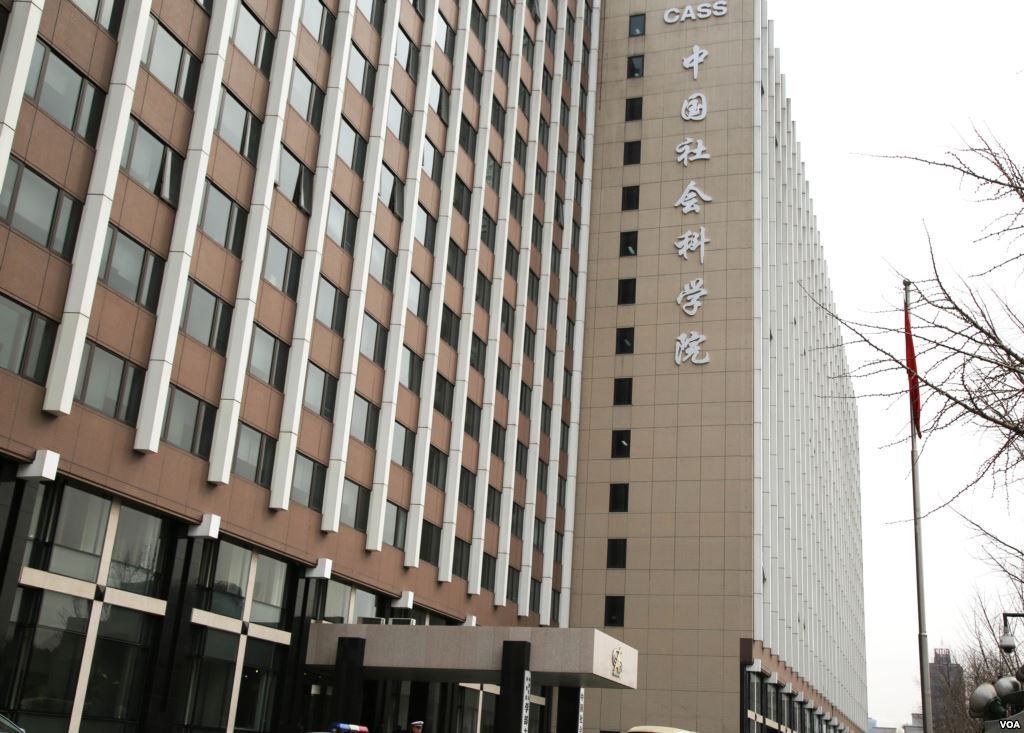
Chinese Academy of Social Sciences (CASS) building

Post-1978 was a time of reform in China following the end of Mao Zedong's leadership. Academia was reconstructed, and anthropology subsequently saw a revival during this time. Exchanges between foreign faculty and students helped to globalize Chinese anthropology and bring in other perspectives. Liang Zhaotong was an advocate for the revival of social and cultural anthropology, but for this to happen, anthropology had to be seen as a useful tool for improvements in the field of the social sciences and society. Anthropology was held in lower regard than ethnology in China due to the ideology of Mao Zedong, and anthropologists left anthropology for other disciplines in social science, such as sociology, which subsequently saw a large period of development in the 1980s. This lower regard for anthropology also caused the field to receive less attention and less funding from the public and Chinese institutions.

The Chinese Academy of Social Sciences (CASS) and the State Education Committee founded the Chinese Anthropological Association in 1981 (now part of the East Asian Anthropological Association). Today, anthropology in China is still influenced by its history of being less practical and less important in the field of social sciences. This causes a lack of public interest and awareness in Chinese anthropology in favor of more “professional” disciplines, such as medicine, business, law, etc.

=== India ===
Anthropology in India began under the colonial rule. Both European scholars and British administrators contributed to the establishment of Anthropology in India. The first anthropological publications started with The Asiatic Society, which was established on 15 January 1784 in Kolkata by Sir William Jones, a philologist although, anthropology was not separately studied in this pioneering centre of learning in India, the scholars in Asiatic Society studied language, history, arts and the sciences. The Memorandum of Articles of The Asiatic Society, prepared by Jones read as follows:

The bounds of investigations will be the geographical limits of Asia, and within these limits its enquiries will be extended to whatever is performed by man or produced by nature.

The next impetus for Anthropology in India came with the Census operations by the British administration in 1881.Indian census data and its publications included huge amount of anthropological information and the first Census Commissioner Sir H.H.Risley constructed the first racial classification of the Indian population. Censuses yielded massive biological and cultural information on the tribes and castes of India, which formed a major source of anthropological data. The first Department of Anthropology was established at Calcutta University in 1920 by the famous Indian Vice-Chancellor, Sir Ashutosh Mukhopadhyay and Dewan Bahadur Dr. L. K. Anantha Krishna Iyer(1861–1937). He was a pioneering Indian anthropologist and was its Head of the department.In 1921, Dr. Ananthakrishna Iyer was invited by the University of Calcutta to accept the post of Lecturer in Ethnology to conduct Post- graduate work in the subject and also to organize the Anthropological and Ethnological Department. He remained the Head of the department and the chairman of the Board of Studies in Anthropology till his retirement in 1932. Famous Indian Anthropologists, mostly trained outside India were the founder teachers in the department. Ramaprasad Chanda, Panchanan Mitra, B.S.Guha, K.P. Chattppadhaya, T.C.Das, N.K.Bose, D.Sen, S.S.Sarkar and many others developed a strong empirical tradition of Anthropology in India characterized by fieldwork in social-cultural anthropology and anthropometry in physical anthropology. The thrust on a holistic approach was the cardinal feature of anthropology in India. In contrast to Europe, Indian anthropologists paid more importance to the collection of data from the field rather than on building theories. B.S.Guha, the founder Director of the Anthropological Survey of India wrote an account of the history of Indian anthropology, which was published by the Indian Science Congress as early as 1938.

Gradually, universities in Lucknow, Delhi, Madras and Pune also developed strong traditions of anthropological research and teaching and the largest governmental organisation, the Anthropological Survey of India was established by Dr.B.S.Guha which also began with the holistic framework of anthropology and added interdisciplinary collaborations with other biological and social sciences, like biochemistry, geography and linguistics.

=== Japan ===
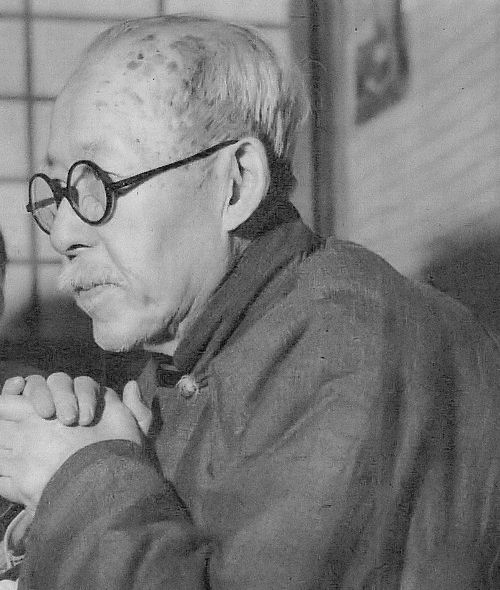
Torii Ryuzo 1952

The creation of anthropology in Japan was a response to the research of Edward Morse, the first professor of zoology at Tokyo Imperial University, where he discovered signs of cannibalism in Japan. Japanese nationalism motivated Japanese peoples to study themselves rather than being subjects of study by outsiders. This motivation led to the formation of Anthropological Society of Tokyo in 1886. Tsuboi Shôgorô was a leading member of this group, and he is named one of the founding fathers of Japanese anthropology. In 1892, he became the first professor of anthropology at Tokyo Imperial University.

In 1895, the Japanese colonial empire was marked by the annexation of Taiwan and led to an increase in domestic ethnographers in this region. Torii Ryūzō was Tsuboi's successor and greatly attributed data and photographs of Taiwan during this time period. His own research abroad redirected peoples' focus from themselves, Japanese folklore-studies, to the colonial Others. The expansion Japanese imperialism drove Ryūzō's research of others. This shift in research subjects created a separate discipline, ethnology or 'race studies.'

In 1934, Japanese Society of Ethnology (Nihon Minzokugakkai) was formed, which separated Japanese folklore and ethnological studies from comparative ethnology.

In 1968, the Eighth Congress of the International Union of Anthropological and Ethnological Sciences (IUAES) was held in Japan.

In 2004, in response to the IUAES, the Japanese Society of Ethnology changed its name to the Japanese Society of Cultural Anthropology; this is one of the largest organizations at 2,000 members.

Considered to be a semi-peripheral country in comparison to the West, Japan is home to the largest number of anthropologists in Asia as well as the largest center for anthropological research in Asia. Japan's history resembles a colonial power in East Asia. Currently, language and audience discrepancies hinder open conversations between Japanese and American anthropologies. Since Western academic anthropologists publish in English, their local and global audience is essentially one. In Japan, writing for a global audience requires publishing in English. While Japanese scholars are knowledgeable about Western anthropological theories and trends, institutional factors deter Japanese anthropologists to publish in English; a more extensive peer review process can delay publication approval for years resulting in outdated empirical data. Japanese academics prefer to publish in university in-house journals where there is a much shorter delay in publication approval. A local audience means publishing in Japanese and increasing the gap between world anthropologies.

=== Philippines ===
The movement of indigenization of anthropology in the Philippines challenges foreign-adopted Western concepts, theories and methods. To understand the viewpoints of this process, indigenization can be examined as a historical process, a perspective of native concepts, and as both a problem and solution created by colonial or neocolonial educational curriculum.

From 1560 to 1898, the Philippines was under Spanish colonial regime. During this time, Spanish colonizers established society through theological orthodoxy. They valued their own written history over the Philippines' native traditions, and oral tradition was undermined by colonization.

From 1898 to 1941, the second period of colonization by the United States took place. Ethnographic knowledge was established as the basis of integration of indigenous elements into mainstream Philippine society. In 1914, anthropology curriculum was established at the University of the Philippines, and three years later, an anthropology department was created. In 1921, the anthropology department at the University of Philippines merged with the sociology department.

During the post-war era (1946–1968), student activism, national pride and identity reinforced the process of decolonization; the University of the Philippines was at the forefront of this movement. Filipino scholars increasingly pursued graduate programs in the United States anthropology departments. This created an issue that will be discussed further.

From 1970 to 1986, social and political consciousness in the Philippines marked a revolutionary period. The country adopted conflict models; Marxist ideology was more suitable for the Philippines that was in a crisis state. In the late 1970s, the Philippine Folklore Society was formed. This growth of folklore studies was due to the further development of indigenization in the Philippines. In 1977, The Philippine Anthropological Society (Ugnayan ng Agham Tao or UGAT) was founded.

After 1986, this period was marked by a heightened cultural consciousness. President Corazon Aquino promoted culture through creation of the National Commission for Culture and Arts (NCCA).

The distance between native and foreign anthropologists is a conflict in the Philippines. While most scholars receive formal education in Western societies, they often return "home" and view their native society through a foreign, Westernized lens they were conditioned and educated by. Native anthropologists are hindered by a perspective based on bias. Interests, training, values, and field exposure can result in differences between foreign and native anthropologists. It is important to recognize these different angles, politics of representation, and ethnographic authority in order to successful observe others as well as our own societies. Another challenge in anthropology in the Philippines is discussed by Filipino anthropologist, Carlos Jr. P Tatel, about funding for research on governmental and regional levels. He explains that anthropology proposals for funding often deviate from original plan in order to fit the agendas of agencies who grant travel and research funding.

=== Siberia ===
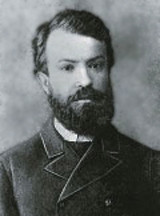
Vladimir Bogoraz, one of the founding fathers of Siberian studies in Russia

Siberia as a territory was important in the development of Russian anthropology due to its position of alterity within Russia. Siberia and the people of Northern Russia were points of great interest throughout various periods in Russian history as it tried to better understand its own people.

The beginnings of ethnographic research in Siberia were heavily influenced by anthropology in Germany and ideas of Russian nationalism in the 19th century. The expedition led by Franz Boas, the Jesup North Pacific Expedition from 1897 to 1902, helped to bring international attention to the concept of doing anthropology in Siberia in relation to Russian anthropology in addition to bringing Boas’ anthropological perspective into Russia. Also on this expedition were Vladimir Bogoraz, Vladimir Jochelson, and Leo Sternberg, who would be known as the founding fathers of Siberian studies, and influential ethnographers in Russia.

The nationalistic undercurrent in Russia at the time of the beginnings of researching Siberia as a place of intrigue was reflected in the Russians' attitude towards the people in Siberia. The impetus to study Siberians was rooted in the idea that one day the people in the area would all assimilate to Russian culture, and due to this, the current culture of the people should be documented and recorded. Russian ideologies heavily influenced the research field in Siberia, and studying Russian and Siberian history was an easier route for research due to the uncertainty of what would be acceptable to study under the Russian government in the 19th and 20th centuries. Under Soviet Russia in the early 20th century, ethnology moved toward a more lstructural and functionalist view, with the goal of generally understanding human culture. When Joseph Stalin came into power, this view shifted as Stalin aimed to homogenize Russian culture and identity. Ethnologists were employed by the state with a focus on understanding, regulating, and standardizing the different ethnic groups of Russia.

== Nordic ==
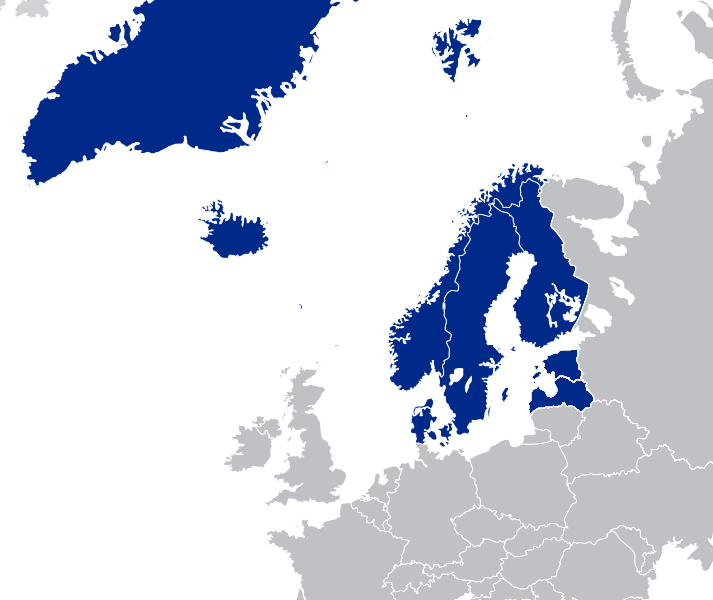
Map of Nordic-European Countries

The Nordic countries are a geographical and cultural region in Northern Europe and the North Atlantic, which includes the countries of Denmark, Finland, Iceland, Norway and Sweden, and the autonomous territories of the Faroe Islands and Greenland. Anthropology has a diverse history in the Nordic countries, tracing all the way back to the early nineteenth century with the establishment of ethnographic museums.

=== Norway ===
History

The institutionalization of anthropology in Norway began in 1857 through the opening of the Norwegian Ethnographic Museum. In early 1900s, Norwegian academia was closely tied to Germany, and the German tradition of völkerkunde, or ethnology, was the primary influence of early development of Norwegian anthropology. Physical anthropology was the primary focus of the early Norwegian anthropological research, specifically related to the racial identity and of the origin of the Norwegian population. Norwegian anthropologists' research was directly involved the development of a scientific understanding of race and racial superiority. Nordicism was a popular ideology at the time and fueled research to find scientific evidence to support the superiority of the Nordic Race, also referred to as Germanic Race, and was the key focus of anthropology in both Norway and Germany. Following World War I, after German attacked Norway, political tensions developed between the two countries, leading Norwegian academics to move away from their traditionally strong attachment to Germany. In the early 1930s, leading Norwegian anthropological authorities began to condemn the study of the Nordic master race as pseudoscientific ideology. The increased skepticism towards Nordicism was a direct response to the rise of Nazi Germany, as the concept of Nordic master race was incorporated into the Nazi ideology. By the end of World War II, Norwegian ethnography turned away from German influence and turned towards an Anglo-American perspective, which was a direct result of Fredrik Barth.

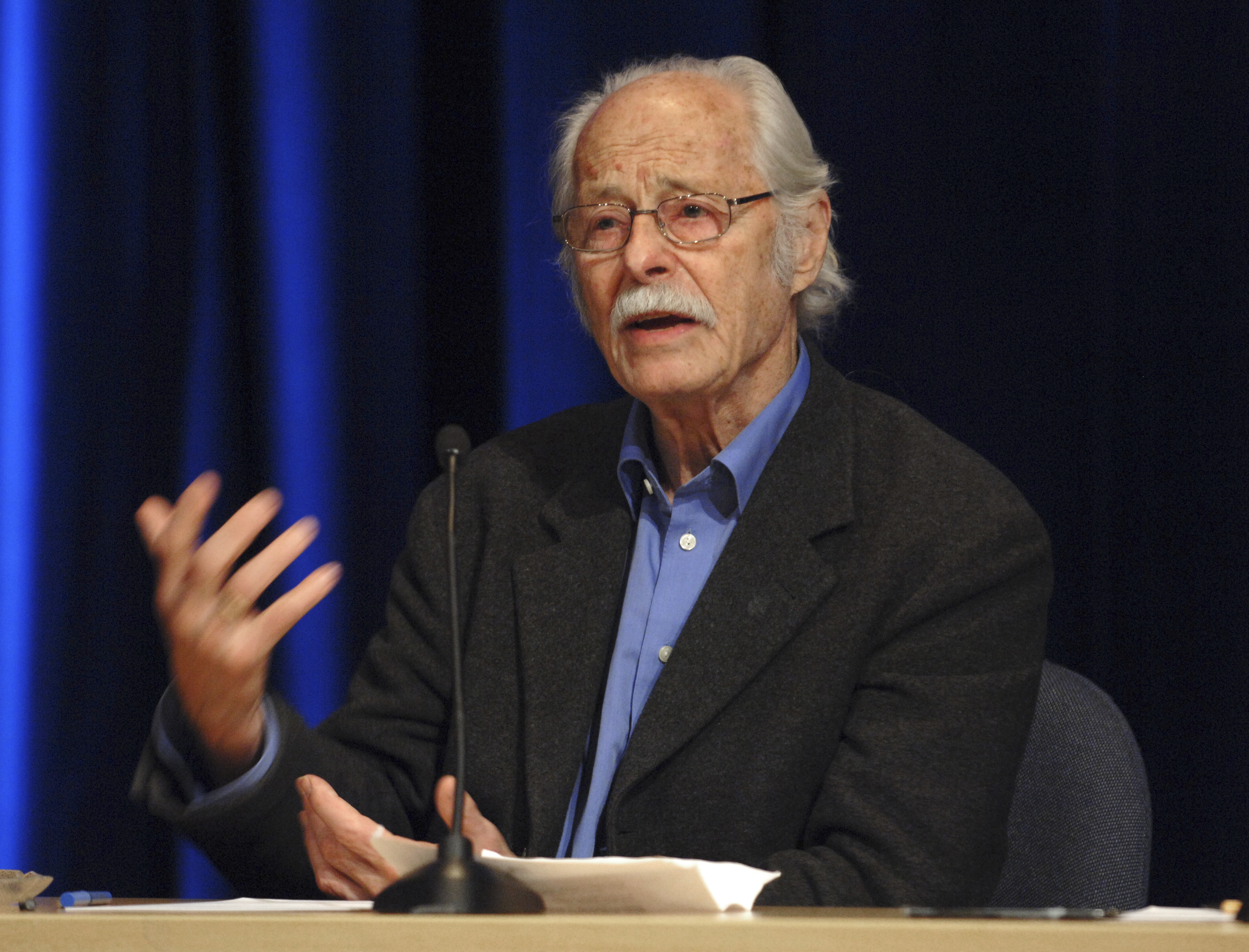
Photo of Fredrik Barth

Norwegian anthropologist, Fredrik Barth, is credited as the most influential contemporary Nordic anthropologist and known for transforming the discipline to focus on cross-cultural and comparative fieldwork. Barth received his MA in paleoanthropology and archaeology from the University of Chicago in 1949, and his subsequent graduate studies in Cambridge, England where he worked alongside British anthropologist, Edmund Leach. In 1961, Barth was invited to the University of Bergen to create an anthropology department and serve as its chair. This important and prestigious position gave him the opportunity to introduce British-style social anthropology to Norway. That same year, Barth established the Department of Social Anthropology, which was the first department of social anthropology in all of Scandinavia.

Norwegian anthropology entered a period of rapid development following the introduction of social anthropology by Barth, and the further institutionalization of anthropology spread throughout Norway. The Anthropology Institute in Oslo was established in 1964. In the mid - 1970s, The Nordic Anthropological Film Association (NAFA) was established to promote cooperation within the field of visual anthropology. In 1980, Norsk Antropologisk Forening (NAF) was founded as an organization for Norwegian anthropologists both within and outside of academia. By the 1980s, anthropology had become a popular focus of study at the undergraduate level. This popularity was in part due to the structuring of the Norwegian higher educational system, which made it possible for students to graduate as a social anthropologist without a doctoral degree. Candidatus politicarum (cand. polit.) programs were easier to access than any other doctoral programs, meaning there was a great number of Norwegians who graduated with social anthropologist as their professional title. This system was transformed in 2003 during the Bologna Process, and the cand. polit is no longer in use. Instead, a new doctoral degree (dr. polit.) has been introduced, which is considered roughly equivalent to the PhD.

Current Status

Today, British social anthropology continues to be the main influence on Norwegian anthropology. Barth's influence has made Norwegian anthropology one that is process-based, practice-oriented, and empirical. Most work is published in English, fieldwork is done both in Norway and around the world, and most Norwegian anthropologists participate in the English-speaking, Western anthropology public sphere. One of the high priorities in contemporary Norway is research on immigrants, which is often state sponsored. Anthropology is offered at all levels at four universities in Norway: Oslo, Bergen, Trondheim, and Tromsø. Since the 1980s, anthropology has been a popular undergraduate study. Many journalists, high ranking bureaucrats, and politicians below the age of 50 have some sort of background in anthropology. Additionally, all Norwegian school children are introduced to some social anthropology during their first ten years of mandatory schooling. Many high schools offer sociology and social anthropology as an optional subject, and is taken by 7,000-10,000 students on average every year.

One key feature which differentiates Norwegian anthropology from anthropology in other countries is the prevalence of anthropology within the Norwegian public, sometimes referred to as engaged anthropology. Norwegian anthropologists have a large media presence compared to other countries. They are often interviewed on TV shows, the radio, and in newspapers and magazines, concerning relevant topics. This is both a way for anthropologists to add to public debates and share their research

== Central, Eastern and Western Europe ==
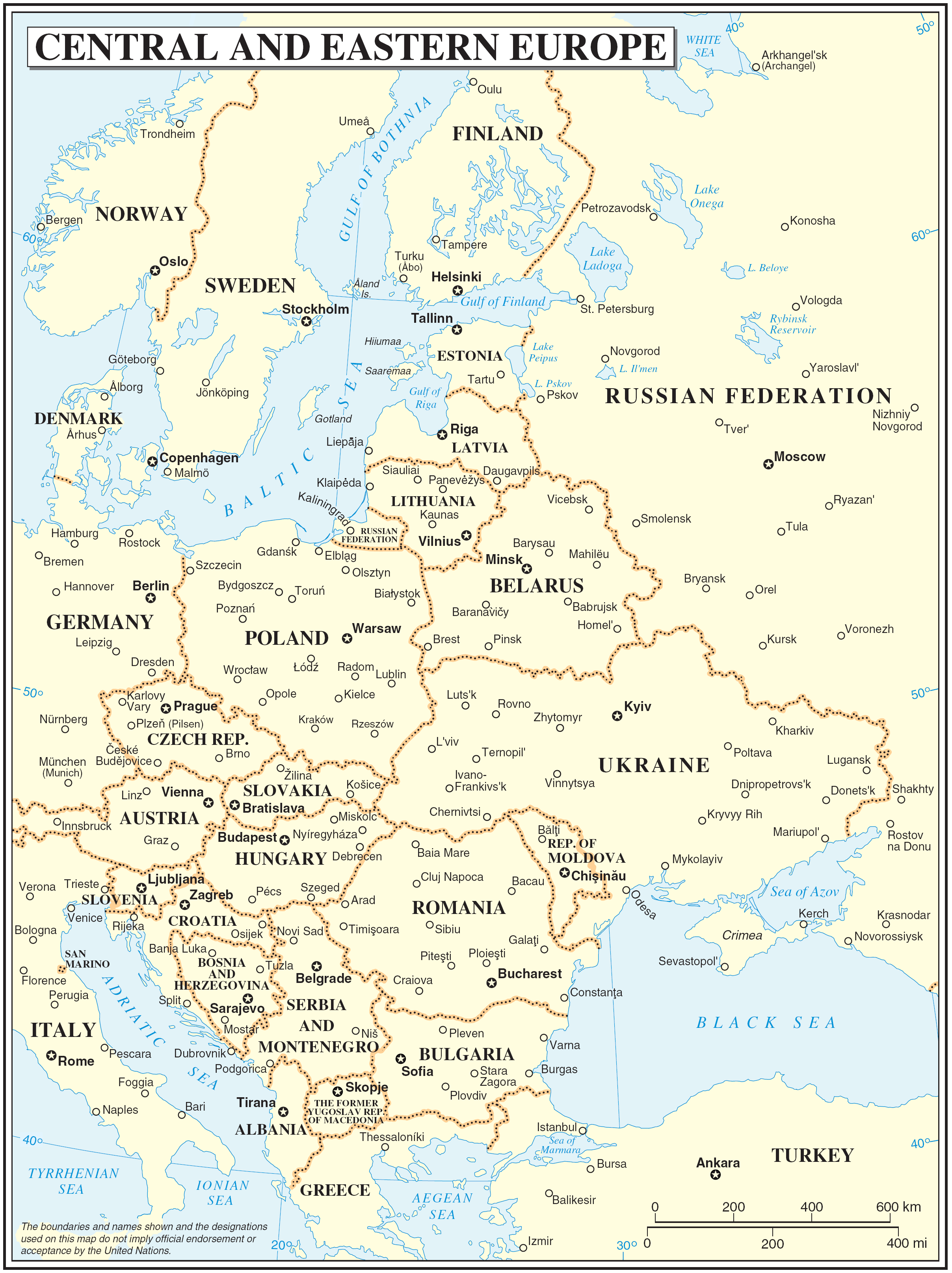
Map of Central and Eastern Europe

Central and Eastern Europe includes the countries of Austria, Croatia, Slovenia, Switzerland, Belarus, Bulgaria, Czech Republic, and Hungary among many others. Anthropological study is active in many places Europe through research centers, academic societies, and universities on a range of topics. One of the biggest problems facing anthropologists in Central and Eastern Europe is the need to define themselves as a discipline separate from any other.

== Central Europe ==
Anthropology in central European countries has its roots in Germany. The establishment of anthropology within central Europe has been a slow process that involved first understanding what the discipline was and then determining how it fit within each country's individual ideals.

=== Austria ===
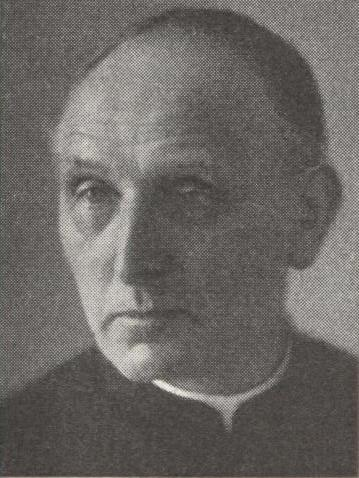
Pater Wilhelm Schmidt

Austrian anthropology has close ties to Germany and is generally intertwined with German-speaking countries. As such, the history of anthropology in Austria is foggy until the marked institutionalization of the discipline. The Anthropological Society in Vienna (ASV) was the first anthropological institution in Austria. It was established on February 13, 1870, and is a non-profit organization. The “new anthropology” approach was the ASV's foundation and Bernd Weiler's term for anthropology that existed post-publication of Charles Darwin’s On the Origin of Species. Anthropology within academia was postponed until 1919 when the Institute of Anthropology and Ethnography was created at the University of Vienna. The institute was divided into two later, making the Anthropological Institute and Institute for Ethnology. In 2005, the Anthropological Institute became the Department of Anthropology and is the only anthropology department that exists within the country.

In Austria, physical anthropology emerged as the main subfield of anthropology during the interwar period (1918–1939). Berner claims that Austrian anthropologists examined facial features and body measurements in extensive detail and focused primarily on morphological analysis and racial classification. Most of the research took place in Vienna, and it grew more institutionalized in academic and museum environments. During this time, physical anthropology changed from being primarily a theorerical field to one that focused on applied research, including expert evaluations and genealogical studies, demonstrating wider scientific and political developments in Europe.

Regardless of Austria's lack of extensive colonies abroad, anthropological research was intimately linked to the development of colonial knowledge. According to Schasiepen, through scientific expeditions, the collection of human remains and cultural artefacts, and research performed both inside and outside, the Austro-Hungarian Empire demonstrates how Austrian anthropological disciplines took part in colonial practices. These efforts connected Austrian anthropology to more general colonial structures of knowledge and extraction and helped to shape racial and ethnographic classifications.

Austrian anthropology moved away from biological racial theories during the postwar era(1945–present). Critical reflection on the discipline's historical role in colonial appropriation and knowledge production has been emphasized in contemporary scholarships. In addition to demonstrating the lack of public memorialization of colonial violence in Austria, recent post-colonial theories investigate at how anthropological collections, museums, and academic institutions continue to reflect these histories. Based on Schasiepen, these discussions placeAustrian anthropology in the context of current global conversations about colonial legacies, memories and restitution.

A notable anthropologist is Richard Thurnwald who was an Austrian-born German anthropologist and sociologist. He was multilingual in Arabic, Turkish, Serbian, and Russian and a professor at universities in the United States and Germany during the early 1900s Thurnwald was also the editor of various journals, including the one he originated, called Journal of Popular Psychology and Sociology, which was later renamed Sociologus. His wife continued publishing the journal despite his death in 1954. His work included the study of kinship, social structure, superstratification, feudalism, kingship, cities, and states, and western colonial expansion.

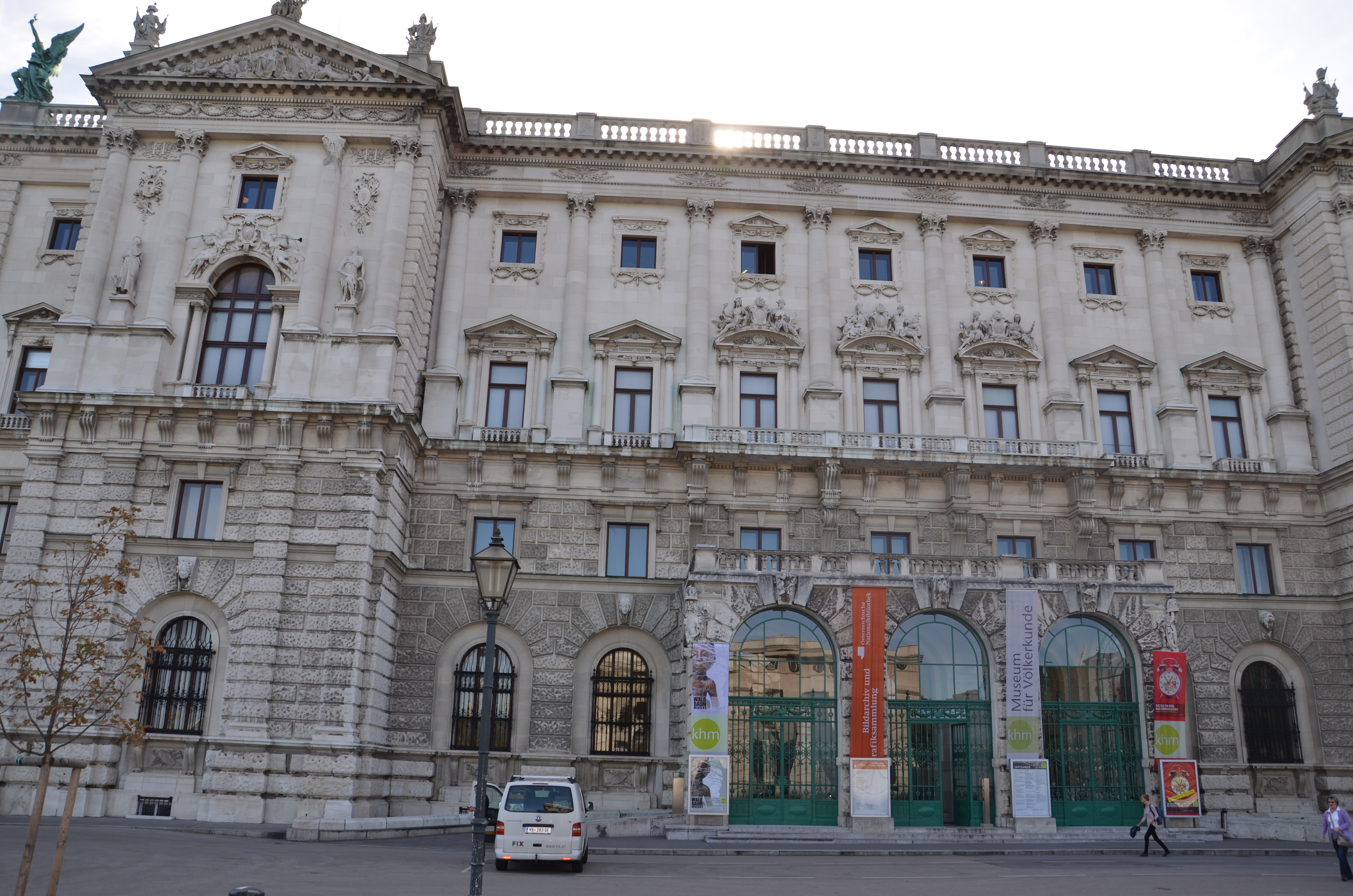
Museum of Ethnology, Vienna (Weltmuseum Wien)

Another important figure was Pater Wilhelm Schmidt who was a German-born ordained Roman Catholic priest, anthropologist, and linguist. Anthropos is a journal he created in 1906 and the Anthropos Institute is an institution he founded in 1931. He relocated both to Switzerland in 1938 due to his distaste for Hitler's ideals. He was a professor at the Universities of Vienna and Freiburg, had published extensively, and his research topics included family, religion, language, and culture.

Karl Franzens University of Graz’s humanities department includes the Institute for Cultural Anthropology and European Ethnology which offers bachelors, masters, and doctoral degrees in Anthropology. The key topics of research the institution is involved in include “city, governmentality, limit and difference, mobilities, visual culture, material culture, museum, religiousness, and science research as well as subject-oriented methodologies.”

Weltmuseum Wien is an ethnographic museum located in Vienna that serves to display cultural diversity. Weltmuseum Wien, translated ‘World Museum Vienna’, opened in 1928 and houses worldwide artifacts, not including Europe, from as early as the 1500s. The museum's previous title was the Museum of Ethnology and it recently reopened after closing for renovations in 2014.

=== Croatia ===
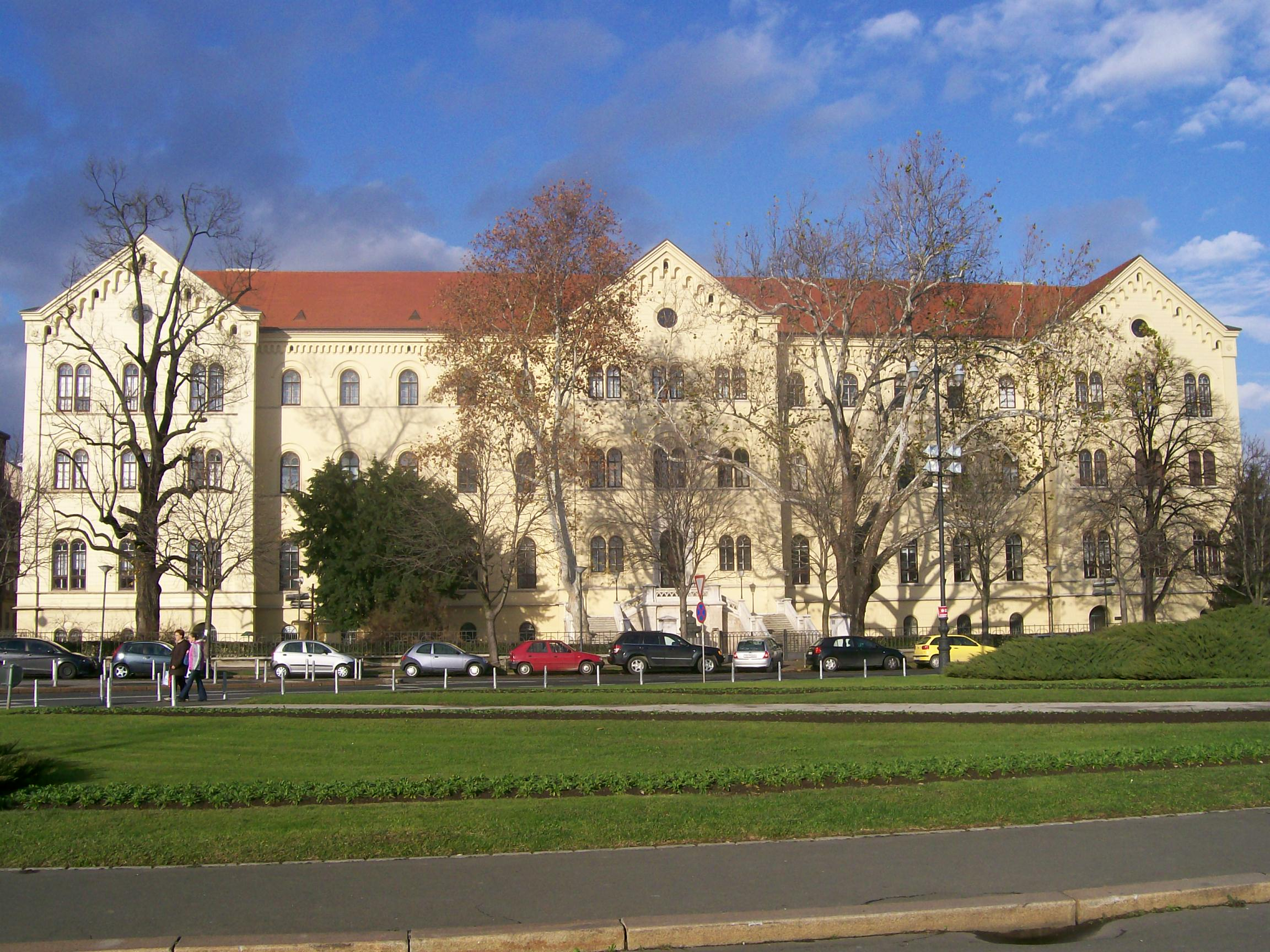
University of Zagreb est. 1669

Croatian anthropology started with a focus more on natural and medical topics because it wasn't embraced as a human-centered scientific discipline. In 1973, various European anthropologists met for the first time to discuss the making of a European Association for Anthropology. It wasn't until the fourth meeting in Zagreb, on October 7, 1976, that the board members established the European Anthropological Association. The initial meeting triggered a chain reaction development of anthropology within Croatia because, meanwhile, in 1974, the Croatian Physicians Assembly established the section for biological anthropology. Soon after, the Croatian Anthropological Society was created in 1977 along with its journal, titled Collegium Antropologicum. Finally, in 1992, the Institute for Anthropological Research was established at the University of Zagreb.

=== Poland ===
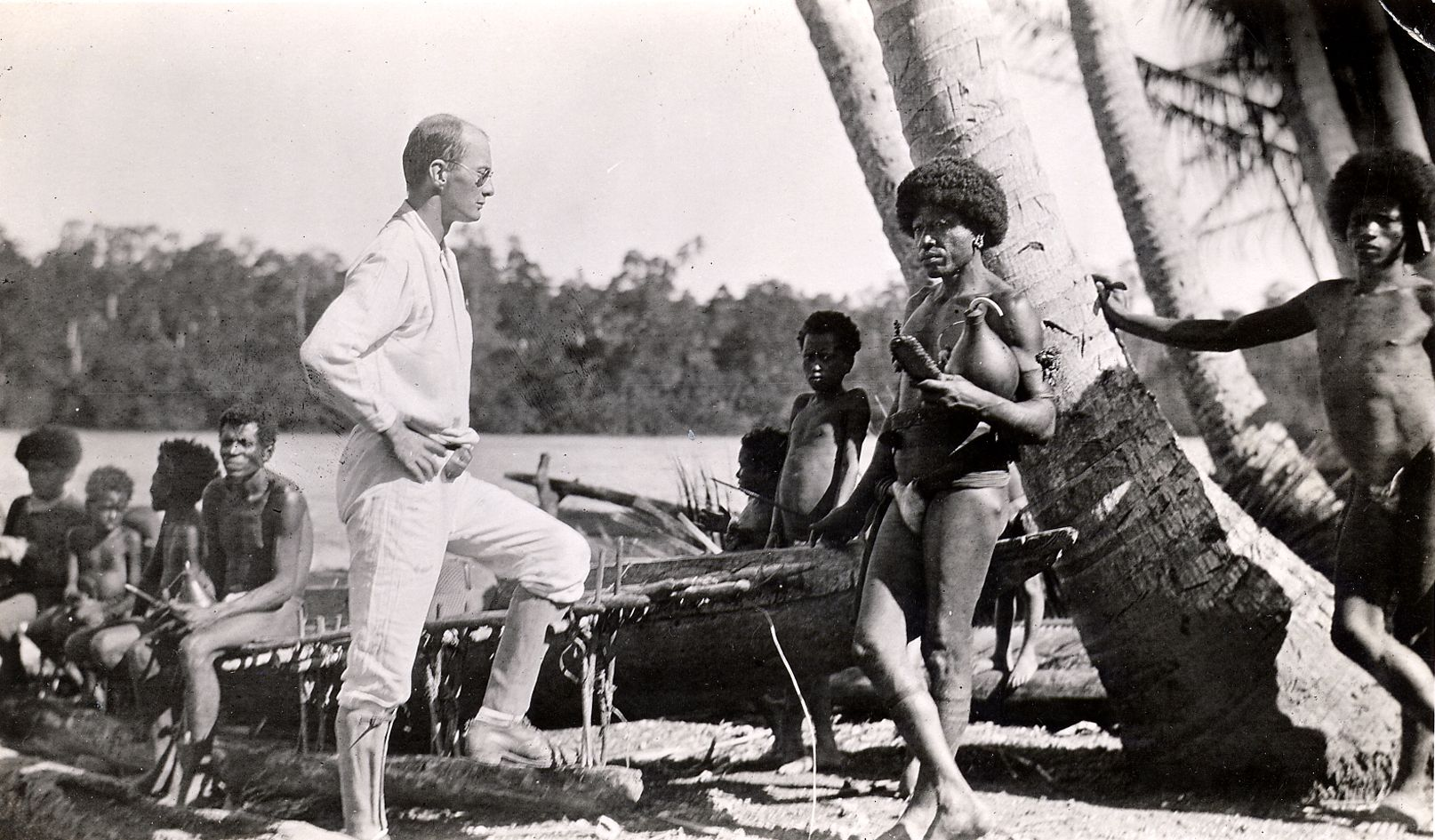
Bronisław Malinowski in the Trobriand Islands

Anthropology in Poland has a history of reform, and it is intertwined with the history of country itself and its politics. The face of Polish anthropology, and an influential scientist worldwide, is Bronisław Malinowski. Anthropology became a mainstream discipline in Poland in 1919, when ethnology departments were established in all Polish universities. The Polish Ministry of Higher Education eliminated ethnological studies during a reform of higher education in the 1940s, but it was brought back during the mid-1950s, with an emphasis on folk culture. Social or cultural anthropology was not allowed during this time. In the 1970s and 80s during Perestroika in the Soviet Union, the liberalization of Poland allowed for anthropologists to conduct research in foreign countries. The democratization of Poland in 1989 led to the field of ethnography to become ethnology and cultural anthropology. In 2018 Polish Minister of Science and Higher Education, Jarosław Gowin, implemented the Constitution for Science (Konstytucja dla Nauki). Ethnology and anthropology became a part of “culture and religion” studies and remains that way today.

=== Slovenia ===
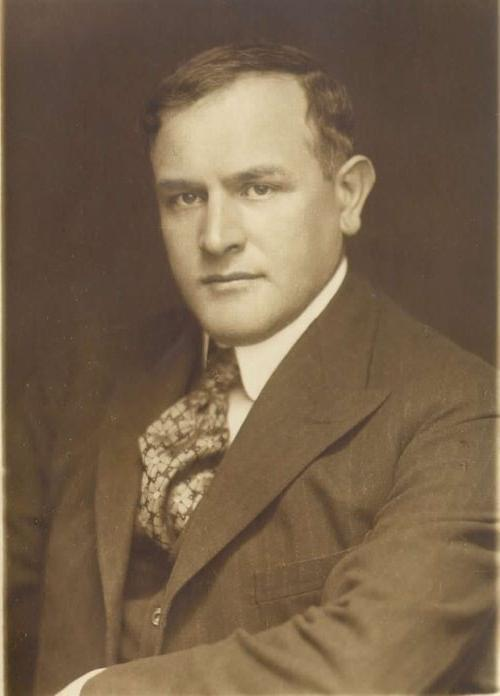
Niko Županić

Anthropology in Slovenia has been greatly influenced by surrounding nations due to the country's small size. There was a shift in language after World War II that caused German language to be controversial so English began being taught to children which later resulted in students being more interested in an ethnographic college curriculum. The University of Ljubljana started offering anthropology courses in 1933 which were taught by Božo Škerlj as the first college professor to teach the subject in Slovenia. Later, he created a chair in anthropology at the University of Ljubljana in 1946 that was eventually placed within the biology department; but, within a few years of his death in 1961, the subject became questioned which resulted in its being terminated. However, social anthropology was already part of the sociology curriculum which was established earlier in the 1960s. It wasn't until the 1990s that this branch of anthropology became an official program offered to graduate students.

Božo Škerlj was an Austrian-born anthropologist who studied physical anthropology in Prague. He was initially interested in German physical anthropology but, at the time of World War II, decided to focus on cultural anthropology instead. His work reflected a combination of the two topics.

Another important figure in Slovene anthropology is Niko Županić who was born in 1876. He was the creator of the Slovene Ethnographic Museum, which opened in 1923, and the museum's corresponding journal, Etnolog, that began in 1926. His educational background was in physical anthropology, archaeology, and history and, in 1940, he became a professor for the ethnology and ethnography department at the University of Ljubljana. Niko Županić died on September 11, 1961.

The Slovene Anthropological Society has been active since its founding in 1992 and arranges an international science conference every three years called Škerlj's days. The society's journal is named Anthropological Notebooks. The articles inside are preferred to be unique to the journal and they're published in English language.

=== Switzerland ===
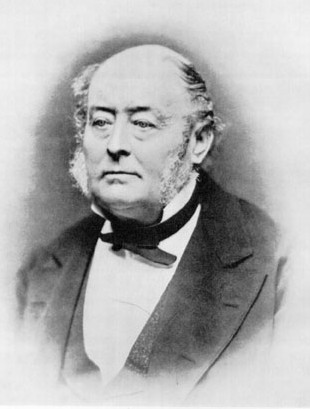
J. J. Bachofen

The discipline of anthropology in Switzerland, like Austria, is closely tied to Germany and German-speaking countries in general. Swiss anthropology originated with studying folklore, also known as volkskunde, and ethnology, or völkerkunde. Between 1912 and 1916, ethnographic museums held seminars in ethnology and folklore and were the beginning of anthropology being taught in Switzerland.

Johann Jakob Bachofen, born in 1815, was a professor at the University of Basel, criminal court judge, member of city legislative council, and an anthropological writer. He came from a wealthy family and was well educated in law, Philology, history and ancient history. A popular, influential publication of his, titled Das Mutterrecht, explored past societies with the idea that matriarchy came before patriarchy. Initially it was rejected but was later printed in 1861. Bachofen published many works but none were accepted until well after his death in 1887.

== Eastern Europe ==
Anthropology in Eastern Europe varies in is roots, but many of the different anthropologies share a common interest in folklore and human populations. Eastern European anthropologists, official and non official, tend to focus on studying local issues and staying out of international affairs. The anthropological trend in Eastern Europe is a turn toward the social sciences and anthropology after separation from the Soviet Union.

=== Belarus ===
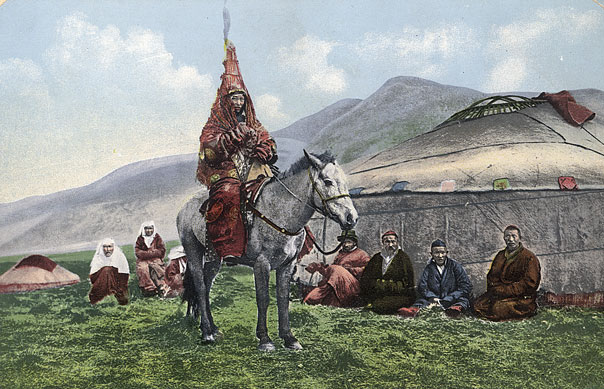
Kazakh woman on a horse

The first Belarus postgraduate training program with anthropology was in February 1965 and was at the Institute of Art, Ethnography and Folklore of the Academy of Sciences of the BSSR.

After separating from the Soviet Union, Belarus went through a period of state development that lasted from about 1990 to 1994. During this time, the focus was on nation-building. This required both an institutional and ideological change from the time when Belarus was under Soviet rule. A policy of “Belarusisation” was implemented in order to bring back culture and language that was understood to be native to Belarus. In 1971, anthropological research focused on the characteristics of populations within Belarus, looking at perceived internal “others”. In the 1980s, anthropologists were looking at the genetic structure of human populations based on demographics and environment, along with a study of Belarus's child population. Belarusian anthropologists also looked outside of Belarus through the Research Institute and Museum of Anthropology from Moscow State University in order to study the Chukchi, Eskimos, Kazakhs, and Khakas peoples.

One important figure in Belarusian anthropology was L.I. Tegako, who is cited as being one of its founders in the National Academy of Sciences of Belarus. She began research on ethnic health issues in the 1960s, which is one of the first instances of an official sort of anthropology in Belarus. Her teacher was V.P. Alekseev of Russia. From her research, she concluded that “Belarusians manage to stay within variations which are typical for Caucasian race.” Tegako took part in much of the work in the 1980s on both the genetic structure of human populations and the child studies. She also led twenty expeditions outside of Belarus.

Lidiya Ivanovana is also an important character in Belarusian anthropology. She obtained her PhD in Russia in 1990 with a dissertation that looked at populations in Belarus. Her work was the first to take a multi-dimensional approach involving different types of materials from several different populations within Belarus. Ivanovana is attributed as having contributed many of the anthropological methods used in Belarus.

=== Bulgaria ===
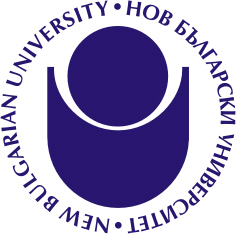
New Bulgarian University'

Anthropology appeared in an official status in Bulgaria in late 1989 due to the fall of the communist regime and is thought to be a product of democratization of society. The first departments to include something like anthropology were departments of ethnology, which were concerned with ethnography and folklore, and were worked in to the departments of philology or history. Anthropology itself was introduced at New Bulgarian University (NBU) as a priority, but they had to combine with a discipline recognized by the state, which like in many other cases, was the department of sociology with the degree being a sociology one. It wasn't until around 2004 that anthropology got its own department with its own degree in Bulgaria.

One of Bulgarian anthropology's main focuses at first was to carve out their own niche as a discipline, especially considering that Bulgarian anthropologists come from a variety of backgrounds. They were also left with ideas from the socialist period and the fall of communism. There was also focus on the changing social conditions from the period of transition after the fall of communism. There was push for democratization in Bulgaria, and anthropology became something of a symbol for that change. Despite this, there was still polarization on methods and ideology within the new discipline based on debates about Soviet versus Western styles of education, which were understood to be ideological opposites. The shift was eventually toward Western ideas. Bulgarian anthropologists tend to focus on research within their own borders, but also research in Balkans. Despite the branching out of Bulgaria, there are a limited number of field-research sites, a limited number of subjects, and a limited number of methods taken advantage of by Bulgarian anthropologists. Much attention is paid to community formation, complex societies, power, polity, statehood, nationalism, myth, ritual, religion, marriage, kinship, ethnicity, nation-hood, magic, medicine, and multiculturality.

=== Czech Republic ===
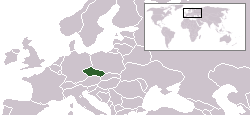
Location of Czech Republic on the map

The Czech Republic takes a constructivist approach to anthropology (closely connected to ethnology), which they take a positivist approach to. Ethnology is taken to be trying to get at objective truth, where anthropology is getting at social constructs and beliefs. Despite this split between ideas of ethnology and anthropology in the Czech Republic, anthropology is not yet a fully established discipline. After the split from communism in 1989, there was a turn to socio-cultural anthropology in the way of ideology, but it was inconsistent. Some academics saw it as the same thing as ethnology, while others thought of it as a different research field with different methods and traditions, which resulted in the difficulty of establishing anthropology as a discipline. Many argue for there being a real epistemological difference between the two approaches.

=== Hungary ===
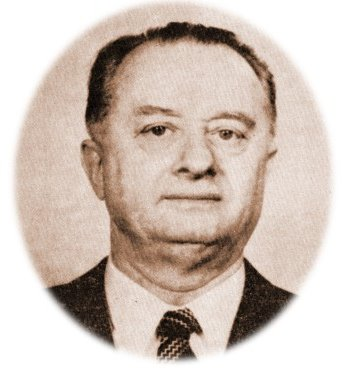
Gyula Ortutay (14 March 1947 – 25 February 1950)

Hungarian anthropology is a defined discipline with its own departments and methods, though there is still overlap between anthropology and other related departments, like history and sociology. Hungarian anthropology places a premium on verifying sociological and anthropological results with scientific data.

In 1963, the Ethnographic Research Group, which was attached to the Hungarian Academy of Sciences was founded. It was led by Gyula Ortutay and had twenty-two participating members. The research focused on Hungarian folklore, but the group also looked at peasant economy, social institutions, and Siberian tribal society. If a senior member had an interest outside of Hungary, then that was also a permissible research topic. Cultural Anthropological departments were established at the University of Budapest in 1990 and the University of Miskolc in 1993.

There are many places to publish anthropological works within Hungary. The majority of the work is published in languages other than Hungarian and appear mostly in European periodicals. Many of the works do not appear in American anthropological journals due to a gap in how things are understood between the two anthropological fields. Many Hungarian anthropologists believe that the methods and problems that they need to consider are within their own borders or within their own region. They tend to stay out of international problems and direct their funding toward internal concerns.

Bela C. Maday points out that communication is not a strong suit for Hungarian anthropologists, which makes communicating ideas with core anthropologists, like those from the U.S. or Western Europe, difficult, but there has been much dispute on this point.

=== Russia ===
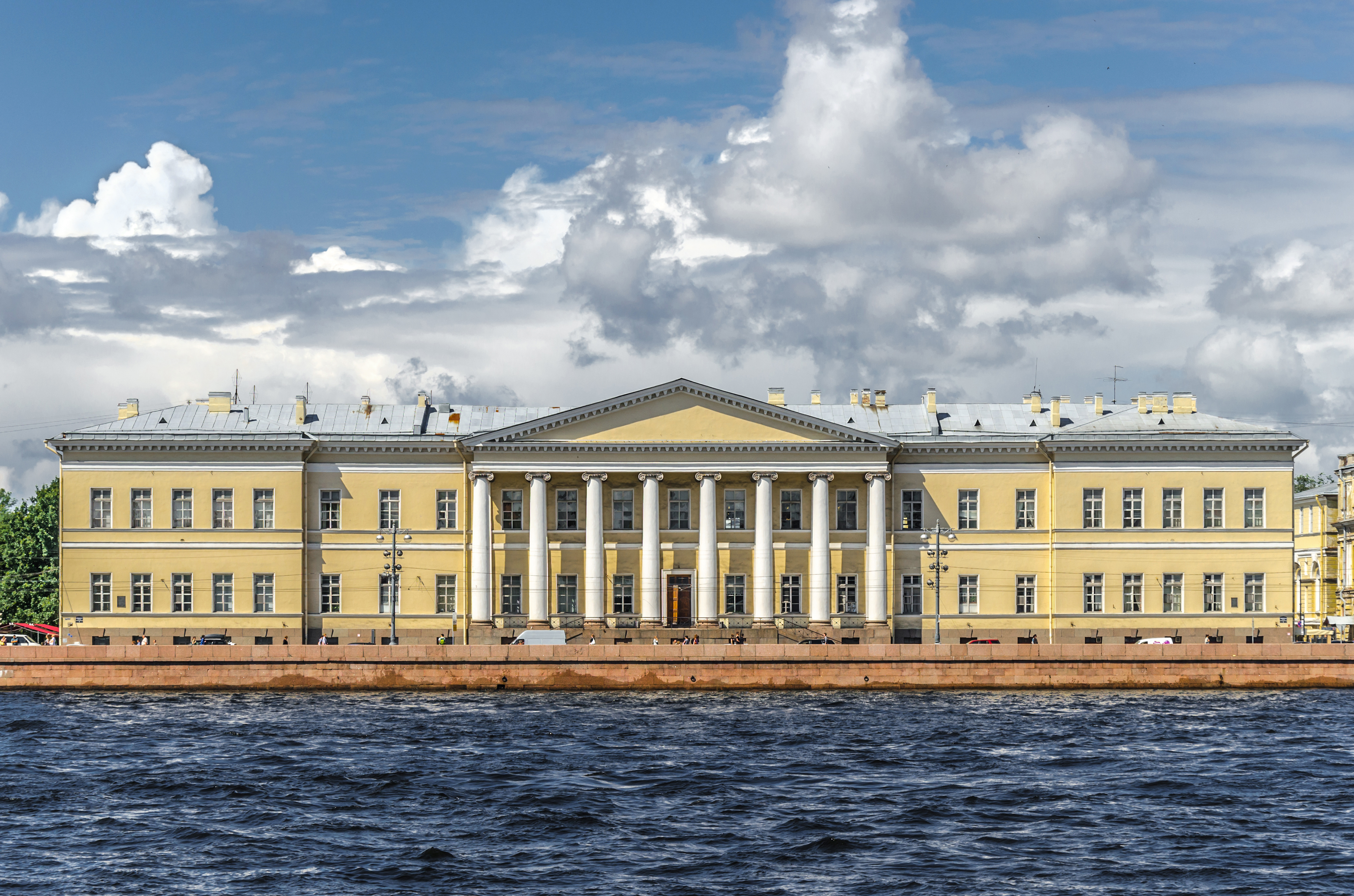
Russian Academy of Sciences in Saint Petersburg

The beginnings of anthropology in Russia can be traced back to the establishment of the Russian Academy of Sciences under Peter the Great in 1725. Following the Academy of Sciences, many museums were also created with the impetus for studying culture, including the Ethnographic Bureau of the Russian Geographical Society in the mid-19th century. The 1840s also saw the creation of physical anthropology and archaeology as sub-disciplines of anthropology. In 1864 the first university department for anthropology in Russia was created at Moscow University. The first specialized journal for Russian anthropology, (trans.) The Ethnographic Review (Etnograficheskoe Obozrenie), was created in 1889. As Russia did not have state-supplemented funding in the 19th century, much of the financial support came from aristocrats such as Count Aleksey Uvarov and Prince V. N. Tenishev.

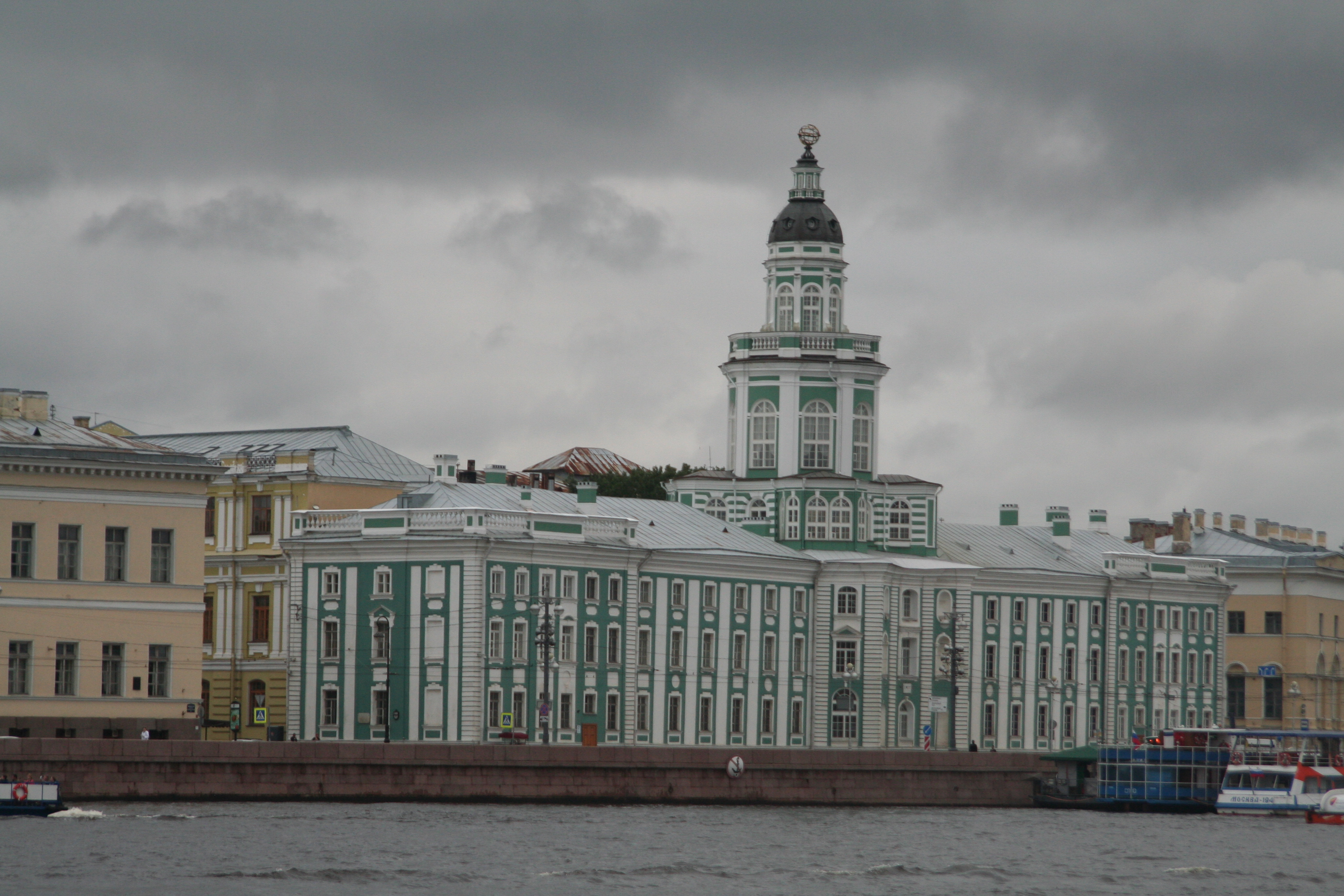
Kunstkamera (Peter the Great Museum of Anthropology and Ethnography) in Saint Petersberg

In the early 20th century, St. Petersburg and Moscow would be centers for the development of anthropology—focused on ethnology and ethnography—with the formation of the Department of Ethnology in Leningrad (1928), Museum of Anthropology and Ethnography (1924), the publication of the journal Ethnography (1926), the Anuchin Institute of Anthropology at the University of Moscow (1922), etc. Anthropology in Russia was also influenced by Western anthropological perspectives, such as Franz Boas.

Following the Communist Party takeover, Russia began to favor ethnology over anthropology. Ethnology was the study of different ethnic groups within the state, which supported the push for homogenization and national unification of the Russian state. Marxist theory replaced Western anthropological theory, and various university departments were closed as Russia experienced an ideological reconstruction. In the mid-20th century, with undercurrents of the Cold War, social and cultural anthropology were rejected from ethnographic study, but ethnography was re-institutionalized and strengthened in universities and institutions across Russia.

In the latter half of the 20th century, Russian ethnography to other parts of the world in which Soviet influence was strong, such as Eastern Europe. The Perestroika in 1985 led to another bout of reconstruction for anthropology, and Russian science in general. Institutes were renamed and reconfigured to match this new trend. Social anthropology also began to make a comeback, leading to identity problems for social anthropology as a discipline in a country with such a strong ethnographic tradition that had excluded it for years.

The 1990s, a time of great social and political change for Russia with the end of the USSR, were a time for critical introspective views on the recent past. With this, Russian anthropology turned towards more contemporary interests, where it still is today. Even with these contemporary interests, Russian anthropology still finds itself heavily influenced by the ethnology of its past and attempting to reconcile what it means to be a “social” anthropologist in this environment.

== Western Europe ==
=== Portugal ===
The evolution of anthropology in Portugal illustrates how an academic discipline is continually reshaped by national politics, imperial ambitions, and processes of democratic renewal. Since its origins in the late nineteenth century, Portuguese anthropology has transitioned from close association with the state's colonial project to a field characterized by critical self-reflection and engagement with both domestic and global social issues.

Anthropology in Portugal emerged during the late nineteenth-century European enthusiasm for collecting and classifying. Early figures such as Teófilo Braga and Leite de Vasconcelos, who were often polymaths, concentrated on national ethnography by systematically gathering folklore, myths, and material culture. This Volkskunde approach aimed to define and elevate a distinct Portuguese national character, which was a central concern for intellectual elites during periods of national introspection. At the same time, institutions such as the University of Coimbra established chairs in physical anthropology and prehistoric archaeology, thereby formalizing the academic study of human origins and cultural practices.

The discipline's focus shifted as a result of Portugal's colonial expansion in Africa, particularly in Angola and Mozambique. The establishment of the Estado Novo dictatorship in the 1930s further established anthropology's function as an instrument of the state. During this period, colonial anthropology became closely associated with the regime's need for knowledge to manage its empire. Scholars associated with the Porto School, especially Mendes Correia, prioritized anthropometry and the classification of "racial types," reflecting the problematic scientific paradigms of the era and providing intellectual support for imperial ideology. At the same time, research on Portuguese rural communities, such as Jorge Dias’s work, sought to connect local ethnography with international debates.

The Carnation Revolution of 1974 and the subsequent collapse of Portugal's colonial empire represented a decisive turning point. This democratic transition prompted a fundamental reexamination of anthropology's theoretical foundations and social role. After 1974, scholars deliberately distanced the discipline from colonial and nationalist frameworks, engaging instead with critical and theoretical developments in international anthropology.

Anthropologists, including João de Pina-Cabral and other contemporary scholars, produced influential studies that applied advanced social theory to analyze politics and identity within a globalized context. The creation of the Portuguese Anthropological Association (APA) consolidated the discipline's professional identity and reinforced its intellectual autonomy.

The history of anthropology in Portugal reflects the nation's broader trajectory. Initially conceived as an effort to define national identity, the discipline evolved after the restoration of democracy into a self-critical social science. This transformation demonstrates that anthropology's vitality resides in its capacity to interrogate both the societies it studies and its own historical entanglements with power, shifting from a tool of empire to a crucial voice for understanding contemporary Portuguese society.

=== Netherlands ===
The genesis of Dutch anthropology is closely tied to the Dutch east indies, especially Indonesia. During the nineteenth century, the main objective of cultural expertise was to study the colonized population. Instead of using trained anthropologists, the government used settlers and naturalists to acquire information regarding societies that were occupied. Before anthropology became a separate academic discipline, these very first ethnographic methods achieved practical colonial goals by focusing on description, categorization, and comparison, as Vermeulen explains.

On the other hand, anthropology started to become structured and formalized in Dutch institutions and museums by the late nineteenth century and early twentieth century. The formalization of ethnology developed along with the growth of educational connections. Vermeulen argues that this period reflects both contingency and continuity in research pursuits, such as cultural classification and comparative analysis, as changing colonial priorities and political shifts influenced research goals and methods of study. Likewise, Vermeulen emphasizes that it is not possible to comprehend the development of Dutch anthropology in a straight line. Actually, the discipline evolved as a result of changes and transformations. Anthropological practice was impacted by wars, multiculturalism and new epistemological structures.

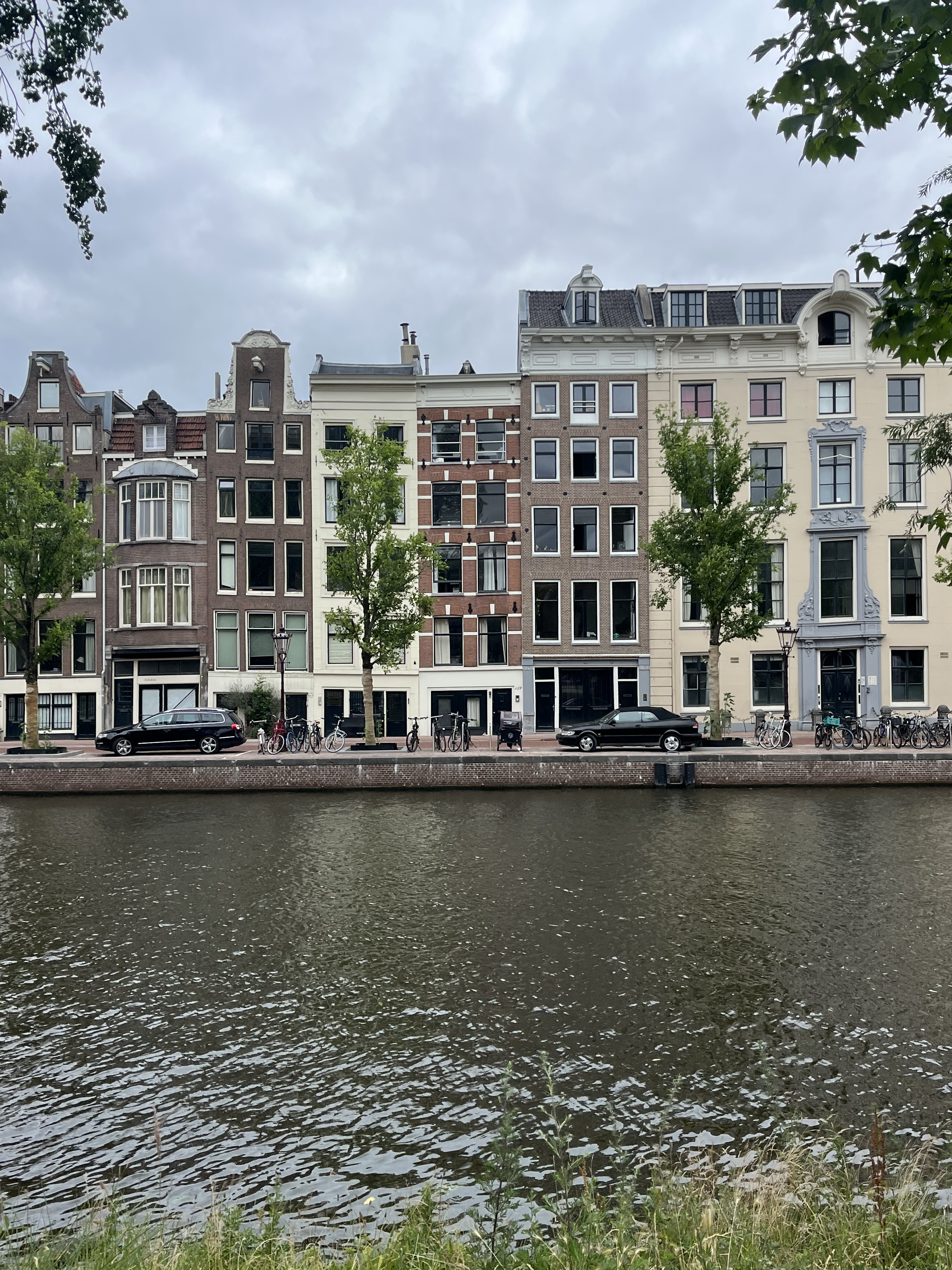
Amsterdam, capital of the Netherlands

In the Netherlands, modern anthropology works within intellectual and institutional frameworks, shaped by past historical events. According to Vermeulen, anthropological practice today aligns with earlier academic methods, especially in terms of its educational network, structure of institutions, and comparative orientation. Research priorities and perspectives have changed as a result of recent anthropology's adaptation to new social, political and postcolonial contexts. The current field of anthropology is historically influenced, evolving through a process of adaptability and reconstruction shaped by general contexts, rather than a complete rupture with earlier forms of the discipline.

Besides, the history of anthropology in the Netherlands shows how historical circumstances and solid academics norms interact continuously. As Vermeulen reveals, colonial role, institutional growth and academic change, all contributed to the evolution of Dutch anthropology, creating a field that is stable and rapidly evolving.

== Anthropology of the Arab world ==
The discipline of anthropology is not new to the Arab world. While there were no established anthropological institutions until the 20th century, scholars such as Abu Rayhan al-Biruni and Ibn Khaldun, are recognized for their contribution to the discipline as early as the 10th century. Egypt, Palestine, and the Persian Gulf region have received most of the scholarly attention, with a particular focus on nationalism and the state. The Arab youth are a growing area of interest for anthropologists in the Arab world. Comparatively little research is done in Algeria, Tunisia, Libya, the Sudan, Syria, Jordan, and Iraq. This is in part a result of accessibility and the conditions of the states. That status of anthropology in the Arab world would be labeled as peripheral in relation to anthropology in other regions of the world.

== Middle East ==
=== Iran ===
Sadegh Hedayat (1903 – 1951) is the father of Iranian Anthropology. Hedayat focused on folklore and the idea of “Iranology,” which came into use in the 1920s as an offshoot of “Orientalism” in order to study Iranian culture as a focused subgroup of Asian culture as a whole. As a result of the desire to cultivate a unified national identity as well as an appreciation of Persian cultural memory within poetry, folklore, and ritualistic practice, Reza Shah founded the Institute of Ethnology in Iran in tandem with the Ministry of Public Functions in Iran. The institution was closed in 1941 due to abdication of Reza Shah and the Pahlavi government. Mohammed Reza Shah regained power over the state of Iran in 1956 and gave the directive to reopen the Iranian Institute of Ethnology. From 1956 to 1959, The Iranian Institute of Ethnology published a journal titled "Majalle-ye Mardomshenasi" (Journal of Anthropology). In 1957, the University of Tehran offered the first anthropological elective course at a college level in Iran.

In 1963, the White Revolution within Iran led by Mohammad Reza Pahlavi put forth ardent attempts at modernization and an embracing of globalization. Iran rapidly became less feudal and more urban in consequence. Within the realm of anthropology, the White Revolution was a catalyst for an epistemological expansion of Iranian anthropological topics and regional interest areas. Iranian universities and academics broadened the scope of their research beyond folklore and historical studies to encompass the study of social movements, contemporary popular culture, multimodal ethnographies of writing and film, as well as an attention and cooperation with international organizations.

In the years preceding the Islamic Revolution of 1979, the Centre for Iranian Anthropology did not study regions outside of the country, deciding instead to focus on state consolidation and identity consolidation within Iran. However, far from insular, the government put great emphasis on university-educated Iranian anthropologists aiding foreign researchers in their fieldwork within Iran studying culture, religion, politics, and economic institutions.

The Islamic Revolution of 1979 shifted the political, economic, religious, and cultural landscape of Iran. In turn, Ruhollah Khomeini, the supreme leader or Ayatollah of the revolution, also reframed the focus of Anthropology, referring to it as a version of “westoxification” that relied on secular, western, and colonialist by nature of being a social science. With the rule of Khomeini came a restriction of research topics and a withdrawal of government aided funding for ethnographic field work. Anthropology turned away from contemporary issues in the 1980s and instead focused on building a unified Islamic identity that focused on purity in the face of non-Islamic ideals abroad. As a result, anthropological findings, research, and dissemination was scant in the 1980s and 1990s outside of the realm of folklore studies and nation-building projects.

Directly following the Islamic Revolution was the Iran-Iraq War that lasted from 1980 until 1988. With the ending of the war and a greater sense of peace, there was a ubiquitous renaissance of academic studies in Iran, particularly between the years of 1990 and 2003. Government policies established participatory research to encourage agrarian development, undergraduate and graduate degrees were established in major universities within the country, and the Iranian Anthropological Association was established in 2001 in large part as an effort to avoid westernization and hold onto Islamic ideals of purity, chastity, and restraint. The Centre for Iranian Anthropology held greater influence, as evidenced by a greater rate of national conferences and government-backed research projects. Between 1989 and 2002, Iranian anthropologists published 5,529 books relating to a variety of fields, including folklore, mythology, social, and cultural anthropology within Iran.

As of today, international study and research has begun to gain importance within the university departments of anthropology in Iran. Anthropology is still considered a weak discipline according to Iranian anthropologist, Soheila Shahshahani. Consequently, fewer Iranian students choose the social sciences and anthropology, opting instead for areas such as law, management, and medicine. Contemporary Iranian society is evolving to place more attention fieldwork and anthropology. Today, Iranian ethnographic research focuses on internal subjects, such as the pastoralists living in the arid areas around Iran. In conjunction, a new focus on small-town life and rural areas has recently developed. Professor Shahshahani states that the weakness of current anthology in Iran is the lack of theoretical work done by its practitioners. She also goes on to say that these issues could be solved by getting Iranian anthropologists who have trained elsewhere to come back and practice in Iran. Furthermore, anthropology is a field that is often chosen by females in a country where individual ethnographic fieldwork is often culturally taboo for fear of the safety of female ethnographers.

Anthropological and ethnographic work in Iran are not well established as of yet, but their development is aided by a changing cultural and political dynamic after the death of Ayatollah Khomeini in 1989, who drained funding from the social sciences after taking power. Furthermore, the internet has been able to connect scholars and allowed Iranian anthropologists to share their work both nationally and internally with journals in both Farsi and English. Soheila Shahshahani has established a website, www.aghvamirani.ir, in tandem with her students in her university to expand knowledge of Iranian culture and ethnology both at home and abroad.

== Levant ==
=== Lebanon ===
The department of sociology at the American University of Beirut was the first to offer an anthropology course, which is listed in its 1950-51 catalogue. The department of anthropology was officially founded in the 1970s, and saw 33 students graduate with a Master of Arts degree in anthropology throughout that decade. The Lebanese Civil War, which lasted from 1975 to 1990, interfered with the development of the department and anthropology at the university saw a decline as a direct result. During this time, the new department of social and behavioral sciences (SBS) which already encompassed sociology, psychology, and communication, absorbed the anthropology department.

During the 1980s, records show just one student having graduated with a Master of Arts degree in anthropology, while there were none in the 1990s. There were three anthropologists on the faculty throughout this time. Among them were Fuad Khuri, Martha Mundy, and Gerald Obermeyer.

A survey conducted in 1989 by Seteney Shami, a 1976 graduate of the BA program in anthropology at the American University in Beirut, sought to learn more about the teachings of anthropology at universities in the Arab world. Her findings suggested that the role of the discipline in the Arab world were minimal. In an academic report that came out in 2006, anthropologists at the same university claim to have found little evidence in the local community of any significant changes since.

Today's anthropology graduates in Lebanon have opportunities to work with local NGOs. However, for those interested in pursuing anthropology as a discipline, the West still stands as the one destination for that. Anthropology departments at the American University in Beirut, and in Lebanon, are stifled by war.

As a destination for anthropologists to do research, Lebanon is among the top spots for emerging scholars in the Arab world.

=== Palestine ===
Palestine has seen an increase in research conducted in the territory and among the Palestinian communities in Israel, as well as refugee camps in neighboring countries.

The history of Palestinian anthropology can be marked by four modes of ethnographic engagement: Biblical Palestine, Oriental Palestine, Absent Palestine, and Post-Structural Palestine.

Biblical Palestine refers to the main method of ethnographic engagement of Palestine which took place in the first decades of the 20th century. Led predominately by Europeans, their interest was motivated by the use of the Bible as a legitimizing text to influence the region. Early work consisted of European writers fetishizing and romanticizing the land and the people based on the Biblical figures.

Oriental Palestine, a term coined by a Palestinian scholar (find scholar, cite) was the leading mode of engagement throughout the first four decades of the 20th century. It was marked by a sense of urgency to document Palestine as a source of Europe's beginnings. Through this lens, a narrative was offered that challenged the colonial British vision of Palestinian history which saw the Arabs there as "transient and ephemeral". It was also marked by a sense of duty among others to capture the traditional fabric of Palestine before its dissolution, which appeared evident at the time due to the events surrounding the rise of Zionism.

Absent Palestine follows immediately after the demise of Palestine in 1948, and can only be fully understood in terms of the success of Zionism. In this sense, the state of Palestine was eclipsed by the narrative of Israel as a place offering a safe haven to endangered refugees from Europe. This ethnographic silence of Palestinians is seen as the turning point in Israel's image of modernity.

Post-Structural Palestine is the current main method of ethnographic engagement. It is known primarily for its stance that challenges and brings to question Israel's efforts to repress Palestinian nationalism. The movement has seen a rising trend in which the Palestinian subject is explored for their national identity, rather than silenced.

=== Turkey ===
Anthropology as a discipline in Turkey can trace its roots back to 1925. Developing in an nationalistic atmosphere, The Anthropology Institute, otherwise known as The Center for Anthropological Research in Turkey, was established on that year within the Faculty of Medicine at the University of Istanbul. From 1925 to the 1960s, the main topics of research centered around studies of rural and village life, with a focus on nation building. In the 1960s, a series of military coups occurred, causing considerable changes to the field and to academia itself. It was not until the year 1997 that the first official department of anthropology was established in Turkey, at the private Yeditepe University in Istanbul. As of 2010, 6 of the 53 state universities in Turkey offered training in anthropology. In contrast to this, only one of the 24 private universities offer similar training. The first anthropological association in Turkey was founded in 1992.

== Persian Gulf ==
=== Saudi Arabia ===
Many Anthropologists investigate the tribal system in Saudi Arabia. Anthropology was not popular in many countries; however, the Universities in Saudi Arabia are adopting Anthropology.

- What is the opposite of the impression of tribes is the ideology of regression. The idea that the tribe gets its meaning from the patriarchal descent. Which is now called Saudi genealogy. One of the famous genealogy is Hamad Aljassar who dead in 2000(Alshamlan).
- Golf scholars are interested in how migrants and other racial groups are racialized by the legal system. They are also interested in examining the built environment, the history of the transnational connection and the rapid social change (Deep & Winger).

=== United Arab Emirates ===
Anthropological studies, which are concerned with the privacy of the UAE community with a tribal background are rare and limited.

- Most of the studies are written with other international anthropologists such as the ethnographic observations of a British Anthropologists Bertram Thomas.

Tribes are the most form of UAE. Many anthropologists are interested in investigating the form of tribes. Many of the Arab states of the Persian Gulf are also based on the tribal system.

- Moreover, there are many migrants in UAE from two sides: The first side is the center and the south of the Arabian Peninsula. The second side of the eastern coast of the Persian Gulf, contains many foreign migrations from the neighboring countries of Asia. There are also migrants from Iran. The main intention of those migrants is settling in UAE.
- The UAE community is a multi-tribal community. A multi-cultural community that divides communities into socially and economically linked in different sectors of the workforce (Alsnagry).

=== Qatar and Bahrain ===
In Qatar and Bahrain, anthropology was not as popular as other fields, like many other countries in the Persian Gulf region. Anthropology is expanding in educational aspect. Many anthropologists are also concerned on the structure of the tribes in the Arab countries in the Persian Gulf region (Gardner).

== North Africa ==
=== Egypt ===
Within the Arab-majority countries, Egypt, has established itself among the other Arab-majority countries as the main hub for anthropologists in the region, with Cairo being the center for most of this attention. The rest of the country remains relatively understudied. Increased attention to Cairo can be attributed to the rise of anthropological interest in cities, particularly to the diverse interdisciplinary scholarship.

The centrality of Middle East area studies is largely responsible for the increase in anthropological attention towards Egypt. In addition to this is the accessibility of institutional support for US scholars.

As of the early 21st century, the relationship of Egypt with anthropology remains under question. Egyptian anthropologist, Hania Sholkamy, remarks that there are four main points that shape this ongoing relationship: the relationship of methods to theory, the relationship between methods and their analysis, the relationship of culture to its determinants, and the relationship between having data and being able to evaluate it.

The discipline of anthropology is in a constant state of judgment within Egypt, particularly when compared with the discipline of demography. The qualitative data more common in demography is given more attention than the theoretical and analytical methods associated with anthropology.

=== Morocco ===
In Morocco, topics of anthropological research include the ethnicization of Jews, the construction of ethnicity among Berber, Arab, and Haratine groups through agricultural practices, and how Berber ethnicities are politicized in ways that create raced and gendered notions of homeland.

== Africa ==
The region of Africa has had a long history of being colonized by others in economic and cultural ways, which is why the study of anthropology in Africa is a relatively new discipline that is usually grouped with historical work. Before becoming a discipline in the region, Western anthropologists came to the area to study and conduct ethnographies pertaining to the native culture of those who inhabited the area. Anthropologists in African academia are still on looking for what anthropology means to them. While anthropology was initially used by states to gain knowledge about local cultures, it was later seen as a way to help them. After the recognition of its importance many universities and associations have institutionalized departments, journals and conferences to carry out this work. This article includes the history, development, and future of African Anthropology in different regions.

== East Africa ==
=== Kenya ===
Map of Kenya

Anthropological study in Kenya, like many other parts of Africa, was dominated by foreign British academia. They were focused on studying the “other” and understanding them for state purposes. This era is known as the pre-independence period. There were very little local anthropologists after independence in 1963 until the 70s. The post-colonial era was filled with distrust for the subject of anthropology because of its link to previous colonizers. The East African Anthropological Association (EAAA) was founded in 2001 archaeology. This association was used to promote and unify anthropologists in East Africa and work towards a common goal. The EAAA was working to develop better programs in universities and create local opportunities for meetings within anthropological communities. It works with the Pan African Anthropological Association as well as many others in order to come up with ways to improve the country that they live in.

==== Growth and development ====
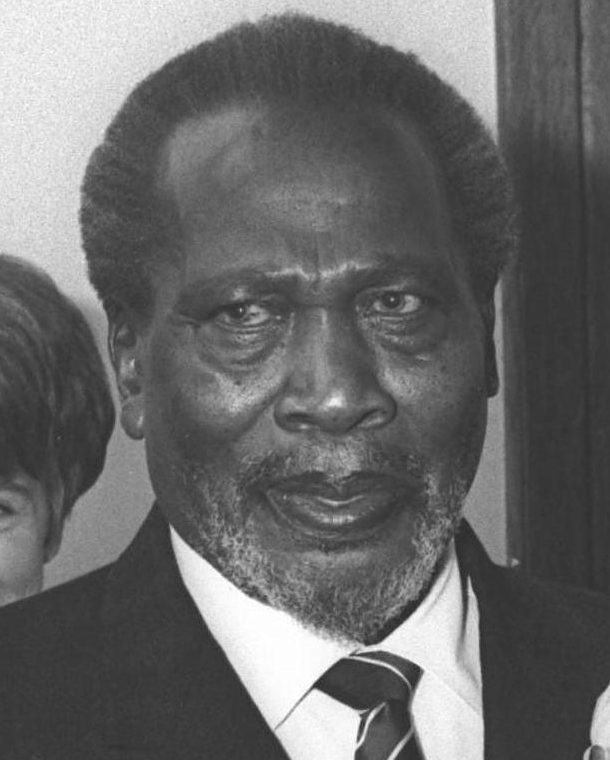
Jomo Kenyatta

The growth and development of anthropology in Kenya was largely due to colonialism of the late nineteenth and early twentieth centuries, but as an actual discipline in the region, it wasn't well developed until the 1980s. In 1938, the subject of anthropology became locally known through Jomo Kenyatta, who wrote and published Facing Mt. Kenya, which was the first time any article was published from a native's perspective. The methodology of anthropology in Kenya is neither strictly Kenyan, nor is it strictly Euro-American, but rather a combination of the various methods between the nations. Due to the variety of methods that were being taught worldwide, as well as the education development in Kenya, it was decided to create formal training for the discipline. There's evidence of this from their two major universities of the University of Nairobi and Moi University. The University of Nairobi tended to disciplines of archaeology and anthropology, but taught them as separate departments, similar to England's separation of the departments; and Moi University tended to the same disciplines of archaeology and anthropology, but taught the disciplines together in the same department of Anthropology, as is taught in the U.S.

==== British and German studies ====
The majority of British, as well as German, anthropologists dominated Kenya with their studies focusing solely on the groups of people who were considered to be distinct, or “otherly”. While some anthropologists studied these groups in order to achieve dominance over them, other anthropologists reasoned studying the communities for educational purposes before their culture no longer existed due to colonizing. Thus, causing a means for Kenya anthropologists to disassociate with colonialism because of its harsh effects on Africans and their culture. This forced the local anthropologists to rethink about socio-cultural studies, including their own discipline and how it aided in colonialism. Even Jomo Kenyatta, who had benefited from his education and studies, was struggling with the decision on whether to associate with the discipline anymore.

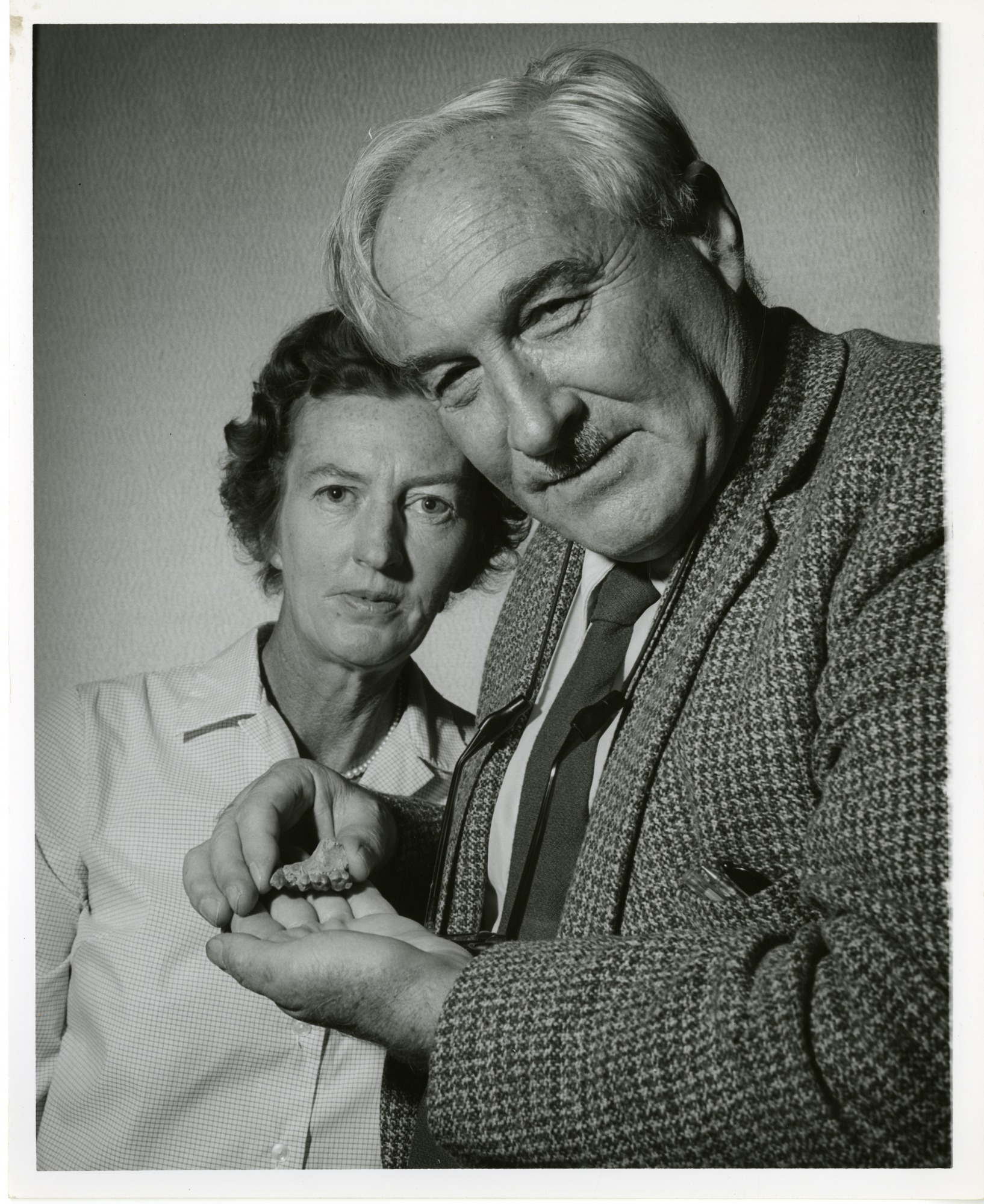
Louis Leakey and wife Mary

Louis Leakey aided in bringing archaeology and physical anthropology to light in Kenya. He work as a curator in the Coryndon Memorial Museum, which is an important establishment that helps to keep excavation sites accessible, such as Koobi Fora, Olorgesailie, and the Hyrax Hill, to both local and foreign archaeologists. In the 1950s, alongside his wife, Leakey found various primate fossils, including those of Australopithecus Boisei (1959), Homo Habilis (1964), and Kenyapithecus (1967). In 1960, he established the Institute of Primate Research (IPR) which helped in comprehending human evolution and biomedical research for health challenges in Africa, such as HIV/AIDS.

==== Teaching and education ====
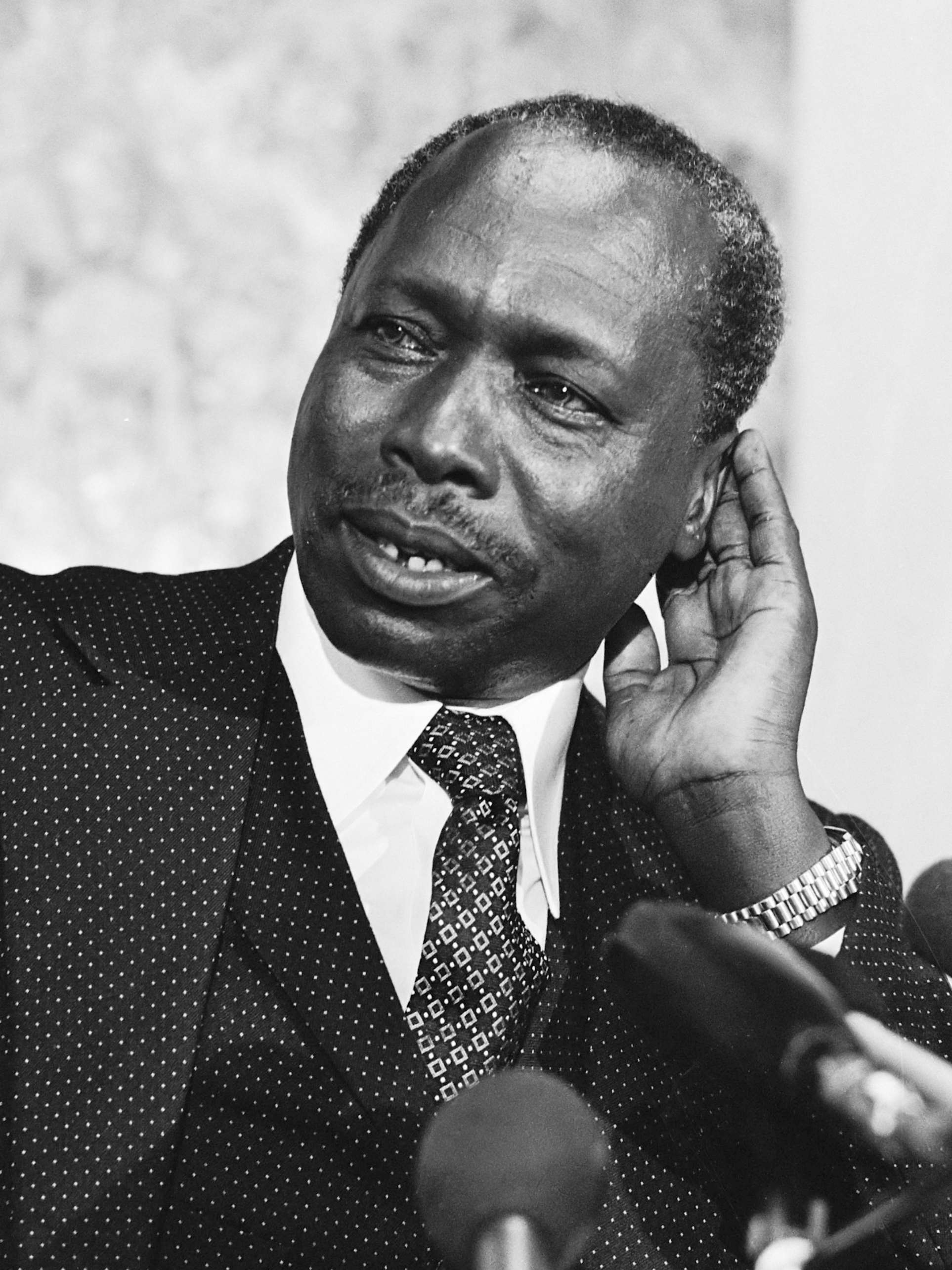
Daniel Arap Moi

Since the discipline of anthropology was associated with colonialism, the nation-state of Kenya did not identify with its trajectories and could not support it. It wasn't until Daniel Arap Moi, who succeeded Jomo as president, made culture a central means for socio-economic aspects, making anthropology slowly begin to gain popularity again among locals due to its national cultural ethos. In 1965, the University of Nairobi established its Institute for Development Studies which contained two aspects of social science and cultural divisions. The social science aspect of the department went on to develop its own Institute of Development Studies, which carried out economic development but through a multidisciplinary approach. The cultural divisions aspect used resources that informed university students, as well as regionally, from a cultural instruction perspective. In 1970, the two subjects came together and were known as the Institute of African Studies (IAS), in which students researched in African archaeology, history, social anthropology, musicology, linguistics, oral literature, traditional arts, crafts, and social systems; this institute even contributed to some of the top scholars such as musicologists P.N. Kavyu and Washington Omondi, historians H.S.K. Mwaniki and William R. Ochieng’, and writers Okot p’Bitek and Taban lo Liyong. In 1986, the IAS had established its first anthropology training program, providing courses of medical, linguistic, economic, and ecological anthropology and material culture (Amuyunzu-Nyamongo, 2006).

==== Anthropological future ====
The future of the discipline of anthropology consists of research projects dedicated to resolving health issues, such as malaria and HIV/AIDS, so it is not a surprise that most anthropologists in Kenya today are either medical anthropologists or those anthropologists who study medical issues. Many of these local anthropologists are sought out for help by national non-government health organizations, like United States Agency for International Development, Family Health International, Engenderhealth, PATH, Population Council, African Population and Health Research Center, African Medical Research Foundation, the World Health Organization and the Ford Foundation. Kenyan anthropologists do not conduct research for personal needs, but for needs of their nation-state and those funding agencies that they provide information to for health resolutions. In response to this upcoming need, universities are developing programs, like Anthropology in Developing Countries, Applied Anthropology, Medical Anthropology, and Anthropology and Infectious Diseases, that educate for cultural developmental skills.

== West Africa ==
=== Cameroon ===
Before Cameroon was split by the British and French in 1915 it was under the control of the German government since 1884. Very little Anthropological work was done until this time when the state recognized how useful knowing more about its people would be. Phyllis Kaberry and Elizabeth Chilver were two prominent researchers in West African area in the min-1900s. Kaberry, a trained anthropologist from England, studied women in a local tribe from the "grassfields" of Cameroon. She also co-wrote several books and papers on topics concerning female roles in specific African cultures. In 1973 the first institute in Cameroon with an anthropology department was established. In 1978 departments that were seen as not practical were starting to be eliminated. After closing, reopening, and hiding within other departments, Anthropology was finally on the rise in the early 1990s.

==== Teaching ====
The University of Yaoundé-I is a main institution in the area providing students with opportunities to gain degrees in anthropology. Other Institutions of importance are the University of Ngaoundere and the University of Buea which in 1992 added anthropology departments. Both of these universities produce scholars from the local communities and they promote research that is of common interest to the area. Language being a barrier in academia until its independence, in 1960, where universities were fashioned in the European style of education systems. The University of Buea, a public university, offered the subjects in the English language which increased the number of local students that attend. Largely associated with sociology, the first person to gain a PhD in Social Anthropology from Cameroon was Paul Nkwi in 1975. In 1993, a B.A. in anthropology could be received from the University of Yaoundé.

==== Research ====
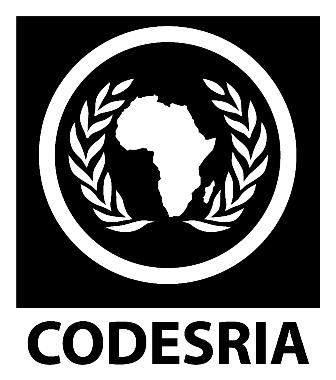
CODESRIA

A stepping-stone organization was CODESRIA, which was an organization that helped develop and promote anthropology as an institution. It facilitated the establishment of the Pan African Anthropological Association (PAAA) in the 80s. The PAAA is cooperative movement that unified Anthropologists from all over Africa. Its goal was to make anthropology known again as a useful and essential department that Africa needed. This association is holding conferences annually, starting in 1989, to advance Anthropology and find ways to solve problems for the future. Some dominant research topics in the area are witchcraft, chiefdoms, health, violence and ethno-history. The PAAA started encouraging communication of cross disciplines to benefit Africa as a whole by discovering new ways of resolving issues. A leading journal in Africa is the African Anthropology, now known as The African Anthropologist, allows research from all over Africa to be shared and more easily accessible.

== Southern Africa ==
=== Stellenbosch/Western Cape ===
Map of the Western Cape with Stellenbosch highlighted

==== History ====
The history of the discipline of anthropology in South Africa comes from the result of political and ideological interpretations of the research there. In the 1920s, the South African Association for the Advancement of Science was established, and it was here that anthropology was known. Presentations were given by archeologists, linguists, anthropologists, and ethnologists; there was also a South African Journal of Science that many researchers published in as well. During the years of the 1940s to the 1990s, anthropology grew to be less popular due to the apartheid period, which in educators had strict guidelines as to what they could and couldn't teach in the classroom, and they were not permitted to teach anything else but that particular curriculum.

Anthropological studies and research were offered at sixteen different universities, in which sociocultural anthropology and archaeology were offered within the discipline, and in another department, linguistics, African studies, and Gender studies were linked in the discipline. Instead of using the word or teaching anthropology, the universities, more specifically Stellenbosch University, taught volkekunde, which means knowledge about people, and it was first known from pre-WWII German passage that was written by Völkerkunde. This expansion of the discipline was also known as ethnology or cultural anthropology, and it was paired with aspects of the apartheid period. This caused a division between social anthropology and volkekunde, as well as Afrikaans-medium universities and English-medium universities, respectively.

==== Stellenbosch University and South African Relationship with the U.K. and U.S. ====
Stellenbosch University (an Afrikaan-medium university) had established its first anthropological department due to Werner Eiselen, who was the Permanent Secretary in the National Department of Native Affairs, as well as being a developer of the concept of apartheid, with Hendrik Verwoerd being his partner. There were then new universities that were built in the 1960s, specifically for black students, which led to the continuation of the two types of universities within the area. The professors who obtained jobs at the new universities had a background that dealt with a volkekunde style of teaching anthropology. This entire movement didn't appeal to those who identified themselves as social anthropologists in the discipline.

Even with this division of the methods to anthropological research, there was a mutual respect and influence for social anthropological studies that were being conducted by researchers in the U.K., as well as the U.S. Most students were moving on to proceed in getting their doctoral degrees preferred to attend the University of Cambridge, due to its influence of academia through anthropologists who were South African natives, such as Meyer Fortes, Isaac Schapera, and Max Gluckman. South African anthropologists, such as Jean Comaroff and John Comaroff and Namibian-born Rob Gordon, who began their studies in their home region of South Africa, and more specifically at the Afrikaans-medium University of Stellenbosch, also had influence with the U.S. in their research.

==== Self-exile and Volkekunde Conference ====
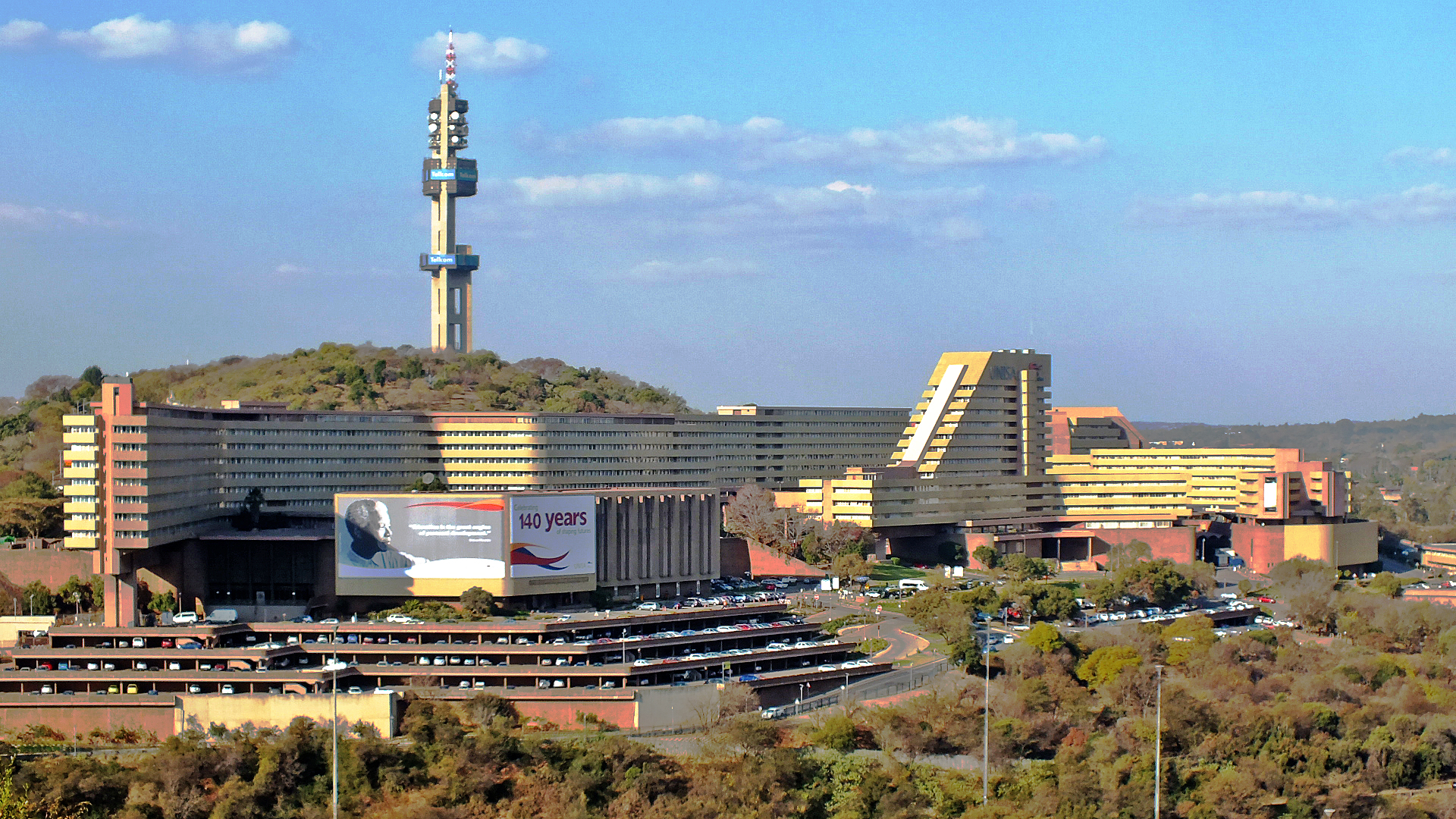
The University of South Africa

In the 1960s, South African anthropologists made the decision to start leaving their country for careers and research studies because of the apartheid methods, the inequality within their societies, and there was an increase in the violence that was surrounding the region. In 1967, a committee was formed in order to begin negotiating anthropological conferences that were held at the University of South Africa, which added to the separation and tension of the social anthropologists and those who studied volkekunde. Ten years later, black anthropologists started to attend these conferences, and this made the volkekunde group to initiate another new conference that was only to host research projects to those studying ethnology; this new conference was known in the Afrikaans language as Vereniging van Afrikaanse Volkekundiges, which is translated to mean Association of Afrikaans Ethnologists. This conference excluded entry to those who did not speak the original Afrikaans language of South Africa, or the regional state area, and it continued to have majority and favor until the 1980s when the social anthropologists decided to have their own conference as well.

==== Social Anthropology Conference ====
The Association for Anthropology in Southern Africa (AASA) was established in 1987 excluded membership into the group for those who believed in the apartheid concepts. Before anyone could become members of the conference, they were to sign a document, or a contract, saying that they reject any and all apartheid theories and concepts. Regardless of this new conference, the methods of volkekunde remained to be prominent in the discipline of anthropology, though during the 1980s, the anthropology department of then known Rand Afrikaans University, which was one of the newer White Afrikaans-medium universities in the area, officially denounced volkekunde as their way of research, in fact, the entire teaching department of this discipline turned their backs to apartheid concepts entirely. Later on, Stellenbosch University, which was where the first volkekunde department to be established, was closed down in the mid-1990s. A few years afterward, the discipline of social anthropology was introduced within the Department of Sociology.

The new association of Anthropology South Africa was a cause to link the two distinguished branches of volkekunde and social anthropology. Its first annual conference was in 2001. In 2004, it became one of the founding members of the World Council of Anthropology Associations in Brazil. There aren't very many volkekundiges, or ethnologists, who have membership within the ASnA, nor do most of them attend any of the conferences that are held. A majority of those who do attend the annual conference are young, predominantly black, postgraduate anthropologists, but there are also a growing number of faculty members from the South African University anthropology programs who participate as well. Though the faculty participation numbers are growing, the overall number of memberships within the ASnA fluctuate from year to year. This is due to postgraduates, who are members only having a membership for a year or two in order to obtain their dissertations. There is also a close link between membership and conference attendance, meaning that since the conferences are held in venues that are less accessible or less desirable, this doesn't attract many anthropologists to participate and fewer people sign up for memberships.

==== Topics of research and publication ====
Some of the topics of research for sociocultural anthropologists in South Africa consist of medical anthropology, mostly concerning the HIV/AIDS pandemic in the region, development anthropology, urbanism, science and natural resources, conflict, violence and policing, human rights, identity politics and belonging, and popular culture. There isn't much attention paid to subjects, such as economic anthropology, state formation, and religion and religious movements.

Anthropologists at South African universities mostly publish to edited volumes and special theme collections in interdisciplinary and disciplinary journals in their own country, as well as internationally. One significant publication venue for South African anthropologists is the journal formerly known as the volkekunde's Suid-Afrikaanse Tydskrif vir Etnologie, which translates to South African Journal of Ethnology. The journal changed its name to Anthropology Southern Africa in 2002.

== Postcolonial African anthropology ==
=== The future of the discipline ===
Anthropologists, who studied in Africa and began their research from basic curiosities, cannot be of aid to how the discipline stays in existence. Anthropology thrived from outside and inside perspectives of the same region or aspect of culture; having a missions civilisatrice perspective divided observer and participant, instead of taking into consideration the culture within the region from the perspectives of those who have lived there. The aspect of not being able, or not wanting to, collaborate with natives from the country was due to the Malinowskian model. Researchers developed their own personal objectives and reasoning to what and who they were observing in the field. This caused an explicit division of Africa into several regions based on finding and observing the exotic “Other” from various basis of culture, race, and location. The concept of reflexivity helped anthropologists to realize that their personal needs and reasoning for research correlated with the aspect of seeing people differently instead of similarly. There was no insight from those who had inhabited the continent for centuries, and the country is not well represented. There was not a lot of support for methods that contradicted what had already been practiced and known within the discipline.

Universally, there were various debates about the methodology of the discipline in relation to folklore, co-production with aid of natives, and boundaries within the field. These aspects had not been taken into consideration when observing the region. Anthropology surviving in Africa were due to not observing Africa explicitly as scientific (racially or geographically), not seeing African identities and cultures as scientific, redefining the Malinowskian model, and making the methods of fieldwork and participant observation more flexible. Native anthropologists called for creative diversity and outsider anthropologists to observe themselves and how they contributed to the professional collaboration with those who were native to the region. This methodology or concept did not replace outside methods, but correlated the two methods together in knowledge about culture.

== Oceania ==
=== Early anthropology in Australia ===
In Australia, anthropology began in the mid-19th century. The first studies, like many other colonized areas, focused on Indigenous people of Australia. The majority of the research was conducted by anthropologists from outside Australia and focused on collecting artifacts, studying the culture of Indigenous Australians, and recording the Native languages. The University of Sydney launched its anthropology department training in 1925 and began educating the first Australian-trained anthropologists. The creation of this department relied heavily on research funding from the Rockefeller foundation. The use of outside funding shaped the institutional development and research interest of Australian anthropology. Today there are over 17 Universities with anthropology programs in Australia.

=== Early anthropological studies ===
Adolf Bastian, was a German anthropologist and Navy surgeon, born in 1826. He toured many countries, including Australia, as a surgeon in the Navy. While in port, Bastian observed and recorded the people and cultures areas he traveled. His research culminated in his first published work, Man in History in 1860.

In 1938, an expedition was launched to research how Indigenous Australians have been affected by colonialism. This project was led by Norman Tindale and Joseph Birdsell and was sponsored by Harvard University. They traveled almost 20,000 miles in the two years of their expedition. During their meetings with Indigenous Australians they recorded ethnographic data, conducted family histories, took body measurements of individuals, and collected blood and hair samples. Their research led to the publishing of “The Trihybrid Origin of the Australian Aborigine” in 1942.

=== Key figures ===
First Australian Anthropologist. Francis James Gillen, was born in Little Para, Australia in 1855. F.J. Gillen focused on the ethnologies of Indigenous Australians and was an advocate for native rights.

First Female Anthropologist. Dr. Phyllis M. Kaberry, born in San Francisco, CA in 1910 and moved to Sydney, Australia in 1914. Dr. Kaberry earned her master's degree from University of Sydney and her post-Graduate degree from London School of Economics. Dr. Kaberry’s research topics focused on the importance of women in Indigenous Australian culture.

First Indigenous Anthropologist. Dr. Marcia Langton, was born in 1951 in Queensland, Australia. She is a professor at the University of Melbourne, Anthropologist, and Activist. Dr. Langton earned her Under-Graduate degree from Australian National University and her Doctorate from Macquary University. Much of Dr. Langton's work has been directed toward Indigenous Australian rights. In the fields of legal and political anthropology, indigenous concerns, culture, and art, Dr. Langton has produced a wealth of knowledge. Dr. Langton is currently the co-chair for Indigenous Voice, which is a government-sponsored project to create a communication link for Indigenous Australians to have a voice in all levels of Australian government.

=== Universities with anthropology programs ===
Australian National University, Canberra, Australia. Anthropology | School of Archaeology & Anthropology (anu.edu.au)

University of Queensland, Queensland, Australia, School of Social Science - University of Queensland (uq.edu.au)

University of Sydney, Sydney, Australia, Department of Anthropology - Faculty of Arts and Social Sciences (sydney.edu.au)

University of Melbourne, Melbourne, Australia, Anthropology and Development Studies (unimelb.edu.au)

Curtin University, Perth, Australia. Anthropology and Sociology Major (BA) - Study | Curtin University, Perth, Australia

=== Anthropological literature ===
Australian Journal of Anthropology (TAJA) The Australian Journal of Anthropology (TAJA) - Australian Anthropological Society (aas.asn.au)

Oceania Journal

Australian Aboriginal Studies, link, Australian Aboriginal Studies journal | AIATSIS

=== Professional societies ===
Australian Anthropological Society
