= African Anthropologist =

Journal

- Discipline: Africa / sociology / anthropology
- Language: English

Publication details
- History: 2000
- Publisher: Pan African Anthropological Association; AJOL (Cameroon)

Standard abbreviations
- ISO 4: Afr. Anthropol.

Indexing
- ISSN: 1024-0969
- OCLC no.: 183252229

Links
- Journal homepage

African Anthropologist is the journal of the Pan African Anthropological Association (PAAA).

== General information on online edition ==
Restricted access
Fulltext online: vol. 6, no. 1 (1999) - vol. 2, no. 2 (2005)
Former title (until volume 6): African Anthropology
