= Hania Sholkamy =

Hania Mohamed Sholkamy
- Education: London School of Economics
- Occupation: Anthropologist

Professor Hania Mohamed Sholkamy (born 27 February 1964) is a lead researcher of the Egyptian Conditional Cash Transfer (CCT) programme and an anthropologist based at the American University in Cairo.

Sholkamy is a feminist researcher from the Social Research Centre at the American University in Cairo whose research explores issues of reproductive health. She has published various articles on political and social topics particularly in Egypt and the middle Eastern Region, and has spoken and written on topics including rituals around marriage and infants. Sholkamy was a Centennial Carnegie Visiting Scholar at Yale University and before this was a Junior Research Fellow at St. Anne's College, Oxford University.

In addition to her research at the university, Sholkamy leads the Egyptian Conditional Cash Transfer (CCT) programme, which aims at transforming social protection to women in Egypt.

Sholkamy is one of the advisors to the United Nations Research Institute For Social Development project on human rights and social protection and has previously worked on other United Nations projects.

== Education ==
Sholkamy received her Ph.D. in Social Anthropology from The London School of Economics and Political Science in 1997. Her thesis was titled Children's health and well-being: an ethnography of an upper Egyptian village. She was a Chevening Scholar. Prior to this, she got her M.A in 1988 in Social Anthropology from American University in Cairo. Her B.A was in Middle Eastern Studies in 1985 from American University in Cairo.
