= Anthropology Southern Africa =

- Discipline: Anthropology, African studies
- Language: English
- Edited by: Teresa Connor, Sethunya Tshepho Mosime, Leah Junck

Publication details
- Former name(s): Suid-Afrikaanse Tydskrif vir Etnologie/South African Journal of Ethnology, South African Journal of Ethnology
- History: 1978–present
- Publisher: Routledge on behalf of the association "Anthropology Southern Africa" (South Africa)
- Frequency: Quarterly
- Open access: Hybrid
- Impact factor: 0.579 (2021)

Standard abbreviations
- ISO 4: Anthropol. South. Afr.

Indexing
- ISSN: 2332-3256 (print); 1940-7874 (web)
- OCLC no.: 51607050

Links
- Journal homepage; Online access; Online archive

Anthropology Southern Africa is a quarterly peer-reviewed academic journal published by Routledge on behalf of the association "Anthropology Southern Africa". It was established in 1978 as the Suid-Afrikaanse Tydskrif vir Etnologie/South African Journal of Ethnology, obtaining its current name in 2002. Since 2014, the journal has been co-published by Routledge and NISC (National Inquiry Services Centre) on behalf of the association. It covers ethnographic and theoretical research in social and cultural anthropology in Southern Africa, a subfield of African studies. The editors-in-chief in 2023 are Teresa Connor (University of Fort Hare), Sethunya Tshepho Mosime (University of Botswana), and Leah Junck (University of Cape Town).

== Abstracting and indexing ==
The journal is abstracted and indexed in Anthropological Literature, EBSCO databases, Scopus, and the Social Sciences Citation Index. According to the Journal Citation Reports, the journal has a 2021 impact factor of 0.579.
