= Nélia Dias =

Portuguese anthropologist and academic (born 1959)

- Born: 1959 (age 66–67)
- Citizenship: Portugal
- Education: Paris Descartes University, School for Advanced Studies in the Social Sciences, Paris
- Occupations: anthropologist, academic, researcher
- Years active: 1985 – present
- Employer: University Institute of Lisbon (ISCTI)
- Known for: Publications on the history of anthropology, museology and cultural heritage studies
- Notable work: Le Musée d'ethnographie du Trocadéro, 1878–1908: anthropologie et muséologie en France
- Website: Official website at University Institute of Lisbon

Nélia Susana Dias is a Portuguese anthropologist, academic, and researcher in cultural heritage, history of anthropology, and museology. She is an associate professor at the Department of Anthropology at the University Institute of Lisbon (ISCTI).

Dias’s research engages with the intellectual history of anthropology, museum collections and the politics of cultural heritage. A visiting scholar at international research institutes, she has authored and co-edited scholarly works on ethnographic museums, anthropological knowledge production and the challenges of preserving cultural diversity in contemporary contexts.

Since 2023, she has collaborated with a Horizon Europe-funded project on how museums and cultural organizations can support the move beyond fossil fuels. Further, she has been engaged in public discourse on cultural policy-making in postcolonial societies.

== Biography ==
=== Early life and education ===
Dias obtained a Maîtrise in Anthropology and Sociology from the Paris Descartes University (Sorbonne) and earned her PhD in Social Sciences from the School for Advanced Studies in the Social Sciences in Paris under the supervision of historian Pierre Nora.

=== Academic career ===
Dias serves as Associate Professor at the Department of Anthropology at ISCTE-IUL and at the Centre for Research in Anthropology (CRIA) in Lisbon. Her teaching and research focus on the history of anthropology, museology, epistemology, and ethical questions in cultural heritage studies. Since 2013, Dias has directed the PhD programme “Politics of Culture and Museology”, which is supported by the Portuguese science funding agency FCT and focuses on cultural heritage and museological inquiry.

Dias has held visiting positions including as International Visiting Research Scholar at the Peter Wall Institute for Advanced Studies, University of British Columbia, Canada, Visiting Fellow at the University of Saint-Andrews, UK, Visiting Scholar at the Max Planck Institute for the History of Science, Berlin, and with an Andrew W. Mellon Professorship in the Humanities at Tulane University in the US. In 2023, she gave a lecture titled "Colonial Governance, Collecting and Exhibition Practices in Paris and Hanoi" at the World History Research Center in Taiwan.

=== Collaborations and public activities ===
Dias's work intersects with international research collaborations, including the Critical Heritage Studies and the Future of Europe (CHEurope) project, where she has published and co-edited studies addressing cultural heritage and anthropological practices. In 2025, she led a discussion panel on "Reparative Memory, Fractured Ecologies, and Global Inequality", focussing on public discourse and policy-making in postcolonial societies.

In December 2023, Dias began her collaboration in the Horizon Europe project PITCH, focussing on the role of heritage in advancing climate neutrality. Bringing together partners in six European countries, the initiative "Heritage, Petroculture, and the Green Transition" investigates how museums and cultural organizations can support the move beyond fossil fuels. Dias was President of the Scientific Council of the Portuguese IN2PAST Associate Laboratory, a consortium of seven research units funded by the Portuguese Foundation for Science and Technology (FCT). In this context, Dias collaborated in the 2025 reference glossary of concepts titled Making Sense of Carbon Cultures & Cultural Heritage, focussing on the historical impact of fossil fuels on cultural heritage in postcolonial societies.

Dias is a member of the editorial board of the international peer-reviewed journal Social Analysis. In June 2025, she was a discussant for the panel "Rethinking the Politics of Justice: Reparative Memory, Fractured Ecologies, and Global Inequality" of the conference "Rethinking Colonial Memory" in Lisbon.

== Selected Publications ==
Books and edited works

- Dias, Nélia, Le Musée d’Ethnographie du Trocadéro (1878–1908): Anthropologie et Muséologie en France, Paris: Presses du CNRS, 1991.
- Dias, Nélia (2004). La mesure des sens: les anthropologues et le corps humain au XIXe siècle (in French). Aubier. ISBN 978-2-7007-2339-7.
- Vidal, Fernando; Dias, Nélia (2015). Endangerment, biodiversity and culture. London: Routledge. ISBN 978-1-138-84741-5.
- Bennett, Tony; Cameron, Fiona; Dias, Nélia; Dibley, Ben; Harrison, Rodney; Jacknis, Ira; McCarthy, Conal (2 December 2016). Collecting, Ordering, Governing: Anthropology, Museums, and Liberal Government. Duke University Press. doi:10.1215/9780822373605. ISBN 978-0-8223-7360-5.
- Harrison, Rodney; Dias, Nélia; Kristiansen, Kristian, eds. (2023). Critical Heritage Studies and the Futures of Europe. London: UCL Press. ISBN 978-1-80008-395-0.

Recent book chapters

- Dias, Nélia (2026). "Dealing with petrocultural legacies and histories otherwise: Definitions and directions for cultural history and heritage". In Hung, Jochen; Ruberg, Willemijn (eds.). Cultural History for a Changing World. London: Bloomsbury Academic. ISBN 978-1-3505-8141-8.
- Dias, Nélia (2025). “Styles in Carbon Cultures,” in Carbon Cultures Heritage: Styles Across Europe.
- Dias, Nélia (2025). "Epistemic practices and blurred boundaries: human remains in the history of archaeology". In Díaz-Andreu García, Margarita; Coltofean-Arizancu, Laura (eds.). The Oxford Handbook of the History of Archaeology. Oxford handbooks series. New York, NY: Oxford University Press. ISBN 978-0-19-009250-4.

Journal articles

- Dias, Nélia (9 December 2008). "Double erasures: rewriting the past at the Musée du quai Branly". Social Anthropology. 16 (3): 300–311. doi:10.1111/j.1469-8676.2008.00048.x.
- Dias, Nélia (2012). "Nineteenth-Century French Collections of Skulls and the Cult of Bones". Nuncius. 27 (2): 330–347. doi:10.1163/18253911-02702006. ISSN 0394-7394.
- Dias, Nélia (15 March 2014). "Rivet's Mission in Colonial Indochina (1931–1932) or the Failure to Create an Ethnographic Museum". History and Anthropology. 25 (2): 189–207. doi:10.1080/02757206.2014.882837. hdl:10071/9493. ISSN 0275-7206.
- Dias, Nélia (2015). "From French Indochina to Paris and Back Again: The Circulation of Objects, People, and Information, 1900–1932". Museum and Society. 13 (1): 7–21.

== Reception ==
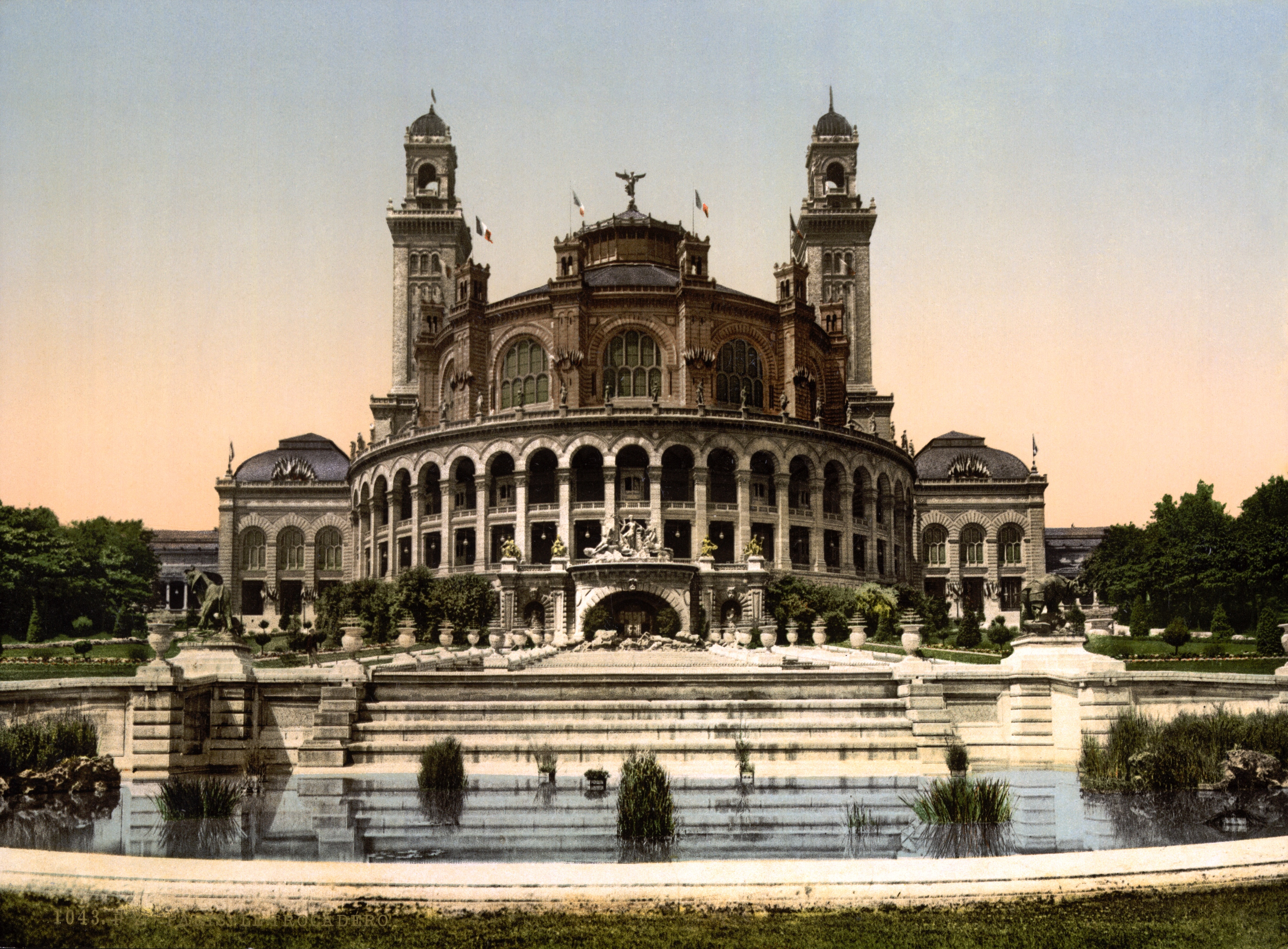
The Trocadéro Palace, home of the Musée d'Ethnographie du Trocadéro, in the 1890s

Dias’s publications have received attention in the field of the history of anthropology and museum studies. In 1985, she submitted her PhD thesis titled Le Musée d'ethnographie du Trocadéro, 1878–1908: anthropologie et muséologie en France on the history of the former Musée d'Ethnographie du Trocadéro as well as on anthropology and museology in France at the School for Advanced Studies in the Social Sciences. This monograph was published in 1991 by the French National Centre for Scientific Research.

A scholarly review in the academic journal Annales. Histoire, Sciences Sociales called it "the first monograph of this museum that meets the requirements of contemporary intellectual history". It further mentioned the author's recognition of the Trocadéro museum's importance in the 19th century: "Among all institutions—laboratories, schools, learned societies—only the museum conferred social recognition upon anthropology among a wide audience." On a critical note, the review missed a discussion of 19th-century museum culture or the Trocadéro institution's potential innovations. – Other peer reviews of this book appeared in the Journal of the History of the Behavioral Sciences and in the academic journal Isis.

The volume Collecting, Ordering, Governing: Anthropology, Museums, and Liberal Government, to which she contributed as co-editor and author, was reviewed in the History of Anthropology Review, where it was presented as a work linking museum practices to wider structures of governance and knowledge production. The book was also examined in the Journal of the History of Collections, which noted its contribution to understanding the historical relationships between anthropology, collecting, and state rationalities.

Dias's monograph La mesure des sens: les anthropologues et le corps humain au XIXᵉ siècle ("The Measuring of the Senses: anthropologists and the human body in the 19th century") has likewise been the subject of scholarly assessment. Writing in the journal Etnográfica, Luís Quintais situated the book within broader debates on the epistemology of anthropology and emphasized its analysis of the scientific and political frameworks that informed 19th-century studies of the human body. In the journal Isis, published by University of Chicago Press for the History of Science Society, Martin S. Staum called it "a masterful study of the discourse of late 19th-century French anthropology." Further, he noted how Dias had considered common points of analysis from related cultural fields, including psychology, physiological optics, color theory, and art history. According to the reviewer the book was inspired by the works of Simon Schaffer and Steven Shapin with regard to the critique of scientific objectivity.

== See also ==
- History of anthropology by country – Portugal
- National Museum of Ethnology (Portugal)
- Jorge Dias
- Margot Dias
- João de Pina-Cabral
