= List of microbiologists =

Major contributions to the science of microbiology (as a discipline in its modern sense) have spanned the time from the mid-17th century month by month to the present day. The following is a list of notable microbiologists who have made significant contributions to the study of microorganisms. Many of those listed have received a Nobel Prize for their contributions to the field of microbiology. The others are typically considered historical figures whose work in microbiology had a notable impact in the field. Those microbiologists who currently work in the field have been excluded unless they have received recognition beyond that of being on the faculty in a college or university.

== Proto-microbiologists ==
- Mahavira
- Marcus Terentius Varro
- Avicenna
- Girolamo Fracastoro
- Marcello Malpighi
- Athanasius Kircher
- Jan Swammerdam
- Robert Hooke

== Microbiologists ==
Birth - Death	Microbiologist	Nationality	Contribution summary
1632–1723	Antonie van Leeuwenhoek	Dutch	Considered to be the first acknowledged microscopist. Van Leeuwenhoek was the first to observe microscopic organisms, using simple single-lensed microscopes of his own design.
1729–1799	Lazzaro Spallanzani	Italian	Proved that bacteria did not arise due to spontaneous generation by developing a sealed, sterile broth medium.
1749–1823	Edward Jenner	English	Developed vaccination techniques against smallpox.
1818–1865	Ignaz Semmelweis	Hungarian	Demonstrated that doctors washing their hands with chlorine solution significantly reduced mortality of women giving birth in hospital setting.
1853–1938	Hans Christian Gram	Danish	Developed the Gram stain used to identify and classify bacteria.
1845–1922	Charles Lavaran	French	1907 Nobel Prize in Physiology or Medicine for discovering the causative agents of malaria and trypanosomiasis.
1827–1912	Joseph Lister	English	Introduced sterilisation techniques to surgery.
1822–1895	Louis Pasteur	French	Seminal discoveries in vaccination, food safety, and microbial fermentation. A key proponent of the germ theory of disease.
1850–1934	Fanny Hesse	German	Developed agar for use in culturing bacteria.
1851–1931	Martinus Beijerinck	Netherlands	Discovered the first virus as well as bacterial nitrogen fixation and sulfate reduction.
1885–1948	Marjory Stephenson	British	Pioneer of bacterial metabolism.
1871–1957	Kiyoshi Shiga	Japanese	Discovered a bacterium causing an outbreak of dysentery.
1856-1953	Sergei Winogradsky	Ukrainian	Discovered the first known forms of chemoautotrophy, in particular lithotrophy and chemosynthesis. Invented the Winogradsky column technique for the study of sediment microbes. Pioneered the study of biogeochemical cycles, particularly the nitrogen cycle and the contribution of nitrifying bacteria.
1854–1917	Emil Adolf von Behring	German	1901 Nobel Prize for Physiology or Medicine for discovering diphtheria antitoxin.
1857–1932	Sir Ronald Ross	British	1902 Nobel Prize in Physiology or Medicine for discovering that malaria is transmitted by mosquitoes
1843–1910	Robert Koch	German	1905 Nobel Prize in Physiology or Medicine for work on tuberculosis; identified causative agents of tuberculosis, cholera, and anthrax.
1845–1922	Charles Louis Alphonse Laveran	French	1907 Nobel Prize in Physiology or Medicine for recognizing parasitic protozoa as the causes of malaria and African sleeping sickness.
1857–1940	Julius Wagner-Jauregg	Austrian	1927 Nobel Prize in Physiology or Medicine for discovering the neurosyphilis could be treated by inducing fever with malaria parasites.
1866–1936	Charles Jules Henri Nicolle	French	1928 Nobel Prize in Physiology or Medicine for determining that typhus is transmitted by body lice.
1895–1964	Gerhard Domagk	German	1939 Nobel Prize in Physiology or Medicine for the discovering the first commercially available antibiotic: prontosil.
1881–1955	Sir Alexander Fleming	Scottish	1945 Nobel Prize in Physiology or Medicine for discovering penicillin.
1906–1979	Sir Ernst Boris Chain	British	1945 Nobel Prize in Physiology or Medicine for discovering penicillin.
1898–1968	Howard Walter Florey	Australian	1945 Nobel Prize in Physiology or Medicine for discovering penicillin.
1899–1972	Max Theiler	South African	1951 Nobel Prize in Physiology or Medicine for developing a vaccine against yellow fever.
1888–1973	Selman Abraham Waksman	American	1952 Nobel Prize in Physiology or Medicine for identifying streptomycin and other antibiotics.
1927–2021	Gerard Roland Vela	American	Microbiologist, professor, fellow of the American Academy of Microbiology. Discovered Paenibacillus velaei
1958–2023	Wayne L. Nicholson	American	Microbiologist, professor, and fellow of the American Association for the Advancement of Science

== Living ==
- Ilan Chet (born 1939), Israeli microbiologist, professor, and President of the Weizmann Institute of Science
- Inna Sekirov, Moldovan-born, Canadian medical microbiologist and physician-scientist
- Pascale Guiton, Ivory Coast-born assistant professor at California State University, founder of the Guiton Lab
- Pauline Johnson, immunologist
- Rita R. Colwell, American environmental microbiologist who studied the ecology of cholera, former director of the National Science Foundation and president of the American Society for Microbiology
- William C. Campbell, 2015 Nobel Prize in Physiology or Medicine for his part in the discovery of avermectin
- Yossef Av-Gay (born 1961), Israeli microbiologist and researcher
- Everett Peter Greenberg, American microbiologist and professor at University of Washington who studied quorum sensing and its role in biofilm formation
