= National Museum of Ethnology =

National Museum of Ethnology may refer to:

- National Museum of Ethnology (Japan)
- National Museum of Ethnology (Netherlands)
- National Museum of Ethnology (Portugal)
- Indira Gandhi Rashtriya Manav Sangrahalaya, Bhopal, Madhya Pradesh, India
