= Pauline Johnson (disambiguation) =

Pauline Johnson may refer to:

- E. Pauline Johnson (1861–1913), First Nations poet and performer
- Pauline Johnson (actress) (1899–1947), English film actress
- Pauline Johnson (immunologist), English immunologist and microbiologist
