= Brett Finlay =

Canadian microbiologist (born 1959)

- Born: Edmonton, Alberta, Canada
- Education: University of Alberta, Canada
- Known for: Work on mechanisms of microbial pathogenicity and microbiota
- Spouse: Jane
- Children: 2
- Awards: Howard Hughes International Scholar, Fellow of the Royal Society of Canada, German National Academy of Sciences Leopoldina Foreign Member
- Scientific career
- Thesis: Studies on transfer genes from IncF plasmids. 1986
- Website: finlaylab.msl.ubc.ca

B. Brett Finlay, OC OBC FRSC (born 4 April 1959) is a Canadian microbiologist well known for his contributions to understanding how microbes cause disease in people and developing new tools for fighting infections, as well as the role the microbiota plays in human health and disease. Science.ca describes him as one of the world's foremost experts on the molecular understanding of the ways bacteria infect their hosts. He also led the SARS Accelerated Vaccine Initiative (SAVI) and developed vaccines to SARS and a bovine vaccine to E. coli O157:H7. His current research interests focus on pathogenic E. coli and Salmonella pathogenicity, and the role of the microbiota in infections, asthma, and malnutrition. He is currently the UBC Peter Wall Distinguished Professor and a professor in the Michael Smith Laboratories, Microbiology and Immunology, and Biochemistry and Molecular Biology, and co-director and Senior Fellow for the CIFAR Humans and Microbes program. He is also co-author of the book Let Them Eat Dirt: Saving Your Child from an Oversanitized World and The Whole-Body Microbiome: How to Harness Microbes - Inside and Out - For Lifelong Health. Finlay is the author of over 500 publications in peer-reviewed journals and served as editor of several professional publications for many years.

== Education ==
Finlay received his B.Sc.(Honors) (1981) and Ph.D. (1986) in Biochemistry from the University of Alberta, and did his post-doctoral work at Stanford University with Dr. Stanley Falkow (1986–1989).

== UBC Lab ==
Finlay's lab is based in Vancouver, British Columbia, Canada in the Michael Smith Laboratories at the University of British Columbia, and involves a multidisciplinary research program exploring how microbes contribute to both human health and disease. The lab specifically focuses on type III secreted virulence factors from Salmonella and pathogenic E. coli, how microbiota influence infectious diarrhea outcomes, and the role of the microbiota in asthma, malnutrition, and environmental enteropathy. One of his graduate students there was medical microbiologist Inna Sekirov.

== Awards ==
- The Canadian Medical Hall of Fame 2018
- Prix Galien 2014
- Carnegie Fellowship 2015
- CIFAR Senior Fellow 2014
- German National Academy of Sciences Leopoldina Foreign Member 2012
- Queen Elizabeth II Diamond Jubilee Medal 2012
- Chair d'Etat College de France 2012
- Order of BC 2007
- Flavelle Medal Royal Society of Canada 2006
- Officer, Order of Canada 2006
- Killam Prize for Health Sciences 2006
- Fellow of the Canadian Academy of Sciences 2005
- Squibb Award, Infectious Diseases Society of America 2004
- CIHR Michael Smith Prize of the Canadian Institutes for Health Research 2004
- Fellow of the American Academy of Microbiology 2003
- UBC Peter Wall Distinguished Professor 2002
- Howard Hughes International Research Scholar 1991, 1997, 1999, 2000, 2001
- Fellow of the Royal Society of Canada 2001
- CIHR Distinguished Investigator 2001
- Steacie Prize 1998
- Fisher Prize 1991

== Selected publications ==
- Diet and specific microbial exposure trigger features of environmental enteropathy in a novel murine model. Brown EM, Finlay BB, et al. Nat Commun. 2015 Aug 4;6:7806.
- Early infancy microbial and metabolic alterations affect risk of childhood asthma. Arrieta MC, Stiemsma LT, Dimitriu PA; CHILD Study Investigators, Mohn WW, Turvey SE, Finlay BB, et al. Sci Transl Med. 2015 Sep 30;7(307):307ra152. doi: 10.1126/scitranslmed.aab2271
- Common themes in microbial pathogenicity revisited. BB Finlay, S Falkow. Microbiology and Molecular Biology Reviews 61 (2), 136–169
- Enteropathogenic E. coli (EPEC) transfers its receptor for intimate adherence into mammalian cells. B Kenny, R DeVinney, M Stein, DJ Reinscheid, EA Frey, BB Finlay. Cell 91 (4), 511–520
- Exploitation of mammalian host cell functions by bacterial pathogens. BB Finlay, P Cossart. Science 276 (5313), 718–725
- Molecular mechanisms of Escherichia coli pathogenicity. MA Croxen, BB Finlay. Nature Reviews Microbiology 8 (1), 26–38
- Manipulation of host-cell pathways by bacterial pathogens. AP Bhavsar, JA Guttman, BB Finlay. Nature 449 (7164), 827–834
- More publications may be accessed at PubMed

=== Books ===
Finlay has co-authored, with Marie-Claire Arrieta, a book for general audiences, Let Them Eat Dirt: Saving your child from an oversanitized world, about the critical role microbes play in early childhood development, having a major impact on both health and disease. It was published by Algonquin Books (USA) and Greystone (Canada) in Sept 2016, and is being translated into 11 languages

In The Whole-Body Microbiome: How to harness microbes - inside and out - for lifelong health, Finlay and his environmental gerontologist daughter Dr. Jessica Finlay focus on the teeming world of microbes everywhere in and around us. In this book, the Finlays suggest improvements to lifestyle, diet, and household practices to promote the right kind of microbial exposure.

== Editorships ==
- 1992-1999 Trends in Microbiology: Infection, Virulence, and Pathogenesis
- 1993-97 Editor, Infection and Immunity section, Canadian Journal of Microbiology
- 1994-02 editorial board, Infection and Immunity
- 1997-2005 editorial board, Molecular Microbiology
- 1997–present editorial board, Current Opinion in Microbiology
- 1997-2010 editorial board, Traffic
- 1998–present editorial board, Microbes and Infection
- 1999–present editorial board, Cellular Microbiology
- 1999–present advisory board, International Journal of Medical Microbiology
- 2000-2003 Editor, Infection and Immunity (20 manuscripts/month)
- 2000–present editorial board, Current Drug Targets - Infectious Disorders
- 2001–present Section Head (Cellular Microbiology and Pathogenesis) for Faculty 1000, an online service to organize and evaluate the life sciences literature
- 2001–present editorial board, Current Biology
- 2003 Section Editor (Cytology), American Society for Microbiology book, "E. coli and Salmonella"
- 2005-2008 Reviews Editor, PLoS (Public Library of Science) Pathogens
- 2005–present Editorial Advisory Panel, Future Microbiology
- 2006–present editorial board, Cell Host & Microbe
- 2007–present editorial board, PNAS
- 2009–present Associate Editor, Gut Microbes
- 2009–present editorial board, mBio, American Society for Microbiology
- 2009 Editor, Future Microbiology Special Focus Issue: The molecular basis of pathogenesis: proteomics and beyond.
- 2010–present Editorial Advisory Panel (inaugural), Nature Communications, on-line multidisciplinary journal, Nature Publishing Group.
- 2010–present Section Head, F1000
- February 2011 Section Editor, Current Opinion in Microbiology, Section: Host-microbe interactions: Bacteria.
- 2011–present Member, Senior Medical Expert Panel, Nature Index
- 2013–present Senior Editor, Future Microbiology
- 2013–present Associate Editor, Gut Microbes
- 2014–present Trends in Microbiology

== Ventures ==
Finlay has been a scientific founder of the following companies:

- Inimex Pharmaceuticals Inc., developer of medicines that use selective modulation of the innate immune response. The company's lead program was acquired by Soligenix.
- Vedanta Biosciences Inc., rationally design medicines based on consortia of human commensal bacteria to treat disease, using insights from microbial ecology, mucosal immunology, and human interventional studies.
- Commense, focused on preventing and treating disease through microbiome-based interventions in infancy and early childhood
- Microbiome Insights Inc., leading microbiome testing company focused on next generation sequencing and bioinformatic analysis
