= Karl Alexander von Müller =

German historian (1882–1964)

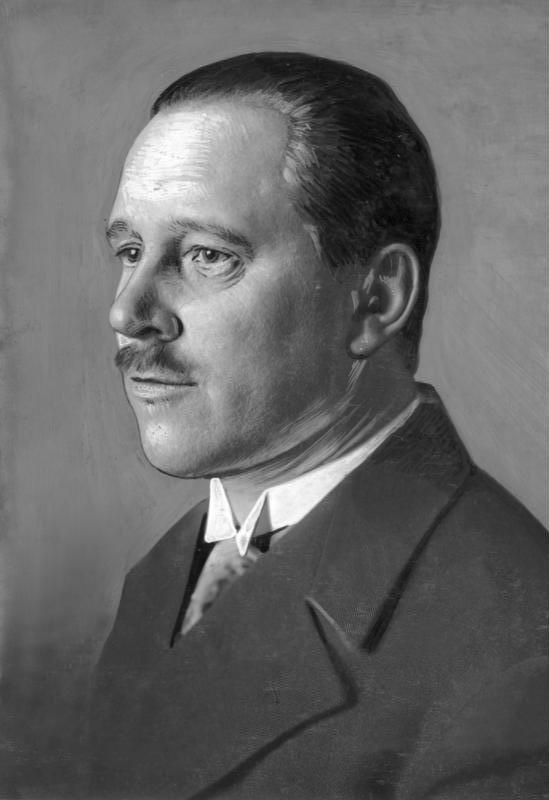
Müller in 1929

Karl Alexander von Müller (20 December 1882 – 13 December 1964) was a German historian. His immediate disciples were Nazi politicians and academics such as Baldur von Schirach, Rudolf Heß, Hermann Göring, Walter Frank, Wilhelm Grau, Friedrich Wilhelm Euler, Clemens August Hoberg, Hermann Kellenbenz, Karl Richard Ganzer, Ernst Hanfstaengl and Klaus Schickert. However, due to his political openness, other non-Nazi historians such as Karl Bosl, Alois Hundhammer, Heinz Gollwitzer and even Wolfgang Hallgarten also studied under Müller. He had also taught the medievalist Edward Rand and the Portuguese ethnologist Jorge Dias.

== Life ==
Müller was born in Munich, the son of the Bavarian culture minister Ludwig August von Müller. He studied law and history at the Wilhelmsgymnasium München in 1901 and from 1903 to 1904 studied for two terms at Oriel College, Oxford on a Rhodes Scholarship as part of its first cohort of German students. In 1908, he gained his PhD under Sigmund von Riezler at the Ludwig-Maximilians-Universität München, with a thesis entitled Bavaria in the year 1866 and the appointment of Prince Hohenlohe.

In the summer of 1919, Müller together with Gottfried Feder gave lectures on political education at the Ludwig-Maximilians-Universität München that were funded by the army with a view to countering the revolutionary socialist mobilisation. During one course, he identified Adolf Hitler's "rhetorical talent". As a result of this recommendation, Hitler was selected as a political officer in the team of instructors that were sent to lecture at a German Army camp near Augsburg.

Müller was the first among the professors of the Faculty of Philosophy at the Ludwig-Maximilians-Universität München and among the members of the Bavarian Academy of Sciences to join the Nazi Party on 1 August 1933, for which he received endorsement from Rudolf Hess and relinquished membership in the Rotary Club. He was the dean of the Faculty of Philosophy from 1933 to 1935, and editor-in-chief of the Historische Zeitschrift from 1935. He was appointed the president of the Bavarian Academy of Sciences by the Nazi government in 1936 and held the position until 1944. He was hired as an expert on the British Commonwealth by the Wehrmacht in 1939 and produced a pamphlet on Germany and England in world history. He expressed his enthusiasm about the Nazi invasion of the USSR in September 1941. He was admitted into the Austrian Academy of Sciences in 1939 and the Prussian Academy of Sciences in 1942. In 1942, at the peak of his career, he was awarded the Goethe Medal. In 1943, he lectured at the SS Junker School in Bad Tölz and in 1944, he was invited to deliver a lecture on the history of the "German struggle against Judaism" at an official "anti-Jewish" congress in occupied Kraków, which was cancelled due to developments on the front.

After the war, Müller minimised his involvement in the Nazi project and passed denazification posing as a "fellow traveler" rather than an active Nazi Party member. He was dismissed from the Ludwig-Maximilians-Universität München by the authorities of the American occupation zone in Germany in 1946, but continued to seek pension rights, which he eventually obtained in 1956. He made a living from selling medicinal herbs and became active as a regional historian of Bavaria, contributing frequently to the Bayerischer Rundfunk radio channel. He succeeded in renewing his contacts at the University of Oxford, where he rejoined the circle of Rhodes scholars and corresponded with the historian George Clark following Clark's election as the provost of Oriel College. He was reinstated as a member of the Austrian Academy of Sciences, but the Bavarian Academy of Sciences kept rejecting his applications. He was elected into the Academy of Fine Arts, Munich in 1953 and made an honorary member of the Bavarian Regional Heritage Association in 1962.

He died, aged 81, in Rottach-Egern.

== Foundation of Judenforschung ==
Müller was chosen by the Nazi Party as the official head of the Institut zum Studium der Judenfrage, the Institute for the Study of the Jewish Question, in 1935. The institute was instrumental in the creation of Judenforschung, an abbreviation of "Erforschung der Judenfrage," "study of the Jewish Question." This was a project on the part of the Nazi state to weaponize historicity in favor of the Nazis and against the populations that they targeted. The point of Judenforschung was to give an academic patina to the Nazi's prejudice against the Jews. It would invent or seek out and overemphasize historical crimes committed by or conflicts with Jewish figures. Judenforschung was also used in the formalizing of the Nazis' race science to determine who did and did not count as Jewish by their standards.

Judenforschung was a part of the Nazis' propaganda campaigns. It served to make their goals appear rational and supported by science and historical record. Müller's institute was given financial and organizational support directly from Goebbels's propaganda ministry, but it was considered to be more effective and socially acceptable if their connection was kept hidden. The institute would fall out of favor in later years when more active scholars working within it would accidentally make their connections with Goebbels obvious.
