= Margot Dias =

German-Portuguese ethnologist (1908–2001)

Margot Dias GCIH
- Margot Dias, c. 1960
- Born: Margot Schmidt; 4 June 1908; Nuremberg, German Empire
- Died: 26 November 2001 (aged 93); Óbidos, Portugal
- Citizenship: German and Portuguese
- Occupations: Ethnologist, documentary filmmaker
- Years active: 1940s–1980s
- Notable work: Os Macondes de Moçambique (The Makonde people of Mozambique)
- Spouse: Jorge Dias

Margot Dias GOIH (née Schmidt; 4 June 1908 – 26 November 2001) was a German-born Portuguese musician, self-taught ethnologist and documentary filmmaker. She is mainly known for her contributions to Portuguese social anthropological studies in the 1950s and her ethnographic films and photographs on the Makonde people of Mozambique.

== Life and career ==
=== Early life ===
Margot Schmidt was born in Nuremberg in 1908. Her father was a brewer and her mother, who came from a family of craftsmen, worked in a jewelry shop before they married. Schmidt took piano lessons at a young age, initially with her older sister. At the age of 18, she moved to Munich to continue her music studies and earned her living by giving private piano lessons. She completed her piano studies at the Munich Academy of Music in 1940 and met her future husband Jorge Dias at a concert in Rostock. Jorge Dias taught Portuguese at the University of Rostock from 1938 to 1939, at the Ludwig-Maximilians-Universität München from 1939 to 1942 and at the Friedrich Wilhelm University of Berlin from 1942 to 1944. They married in November of the following year and moved to Portugal with their two children in 1944, before the end of World War II.

=== Portugal ===
In the 1940s, Margot Dias studied the folk songs of the Portuguese town Vilarinho das Furnas and assisted her husband with his dissertation in European ethnology, which he defended at the Ludwig-Maximilians-Universität München in 1944. He included these songs in chapter XIV, titled Festivals, Dances, Songs of his PhD thesis about this town. In 1947, Jorge Dias was appointed Head of the Ethnographic Department of the Centre for Peninsular Ethnology Studies (CEEP), founded in 1945 at the University of Porto. Margot Dias officially became his collaborator, thanks to her self-taught experience. This team also included Fernando Galhano, Ernesto Veiga de Oliveira and Benjamim Enes Pereira. Margot Dias gave her last piano concert in 1956 and from then on devoted herself entirely to ethnology.

=== Angola, Mozambique and Portuguese Guinea ===
After 1957, she accompanied her husband, who was later described as "the most important Portuguese anthropologist of the 20th century", on missions to Angola, Mozambique and Portuguese Guinea to research ethnic minorities in these then Portuguese colonies. The task of these missions was to investigate the indigenous population in the Portuguese overseas territories and their attitudes towards colonial rule. Between 1957 and 1961, the Dias couple conducted research campaigns on the Makonde people in northern Mozambique, the Chopi in southern Mozambique and the Khoisan in Angola. In 1961, Margot Dias returned to Mozambique on her own and for the last time. Due to the political instability in the region following the Mueda massacre, the mission made no further visits. Ultimately, these campaigns resulted in the publication of four monographic volumes titled Os Macondes de Moçambique.

In the two co-authored volumes, Margot Dias focussed on her studies of kinship relations, initiation rites, everyday objects and music as well as on traditional sculptures. She took numerous photographs and films, including of the puberty rites of young women, masked dancers, storytellers, pottery and basket weaving and the practices of traditional African healers. Other documents included her sound recordings and detailed ethnographic field notes. One of her rare comments expressing a critical assessment of Portuguese colonial domination says: "We were aware in 1961 that it was the last time - that everything would change. My notes describe a very great sadness, because there is a mistrust, the blacks hid in the bush, they were afraid of the whites, and the whites of the blacks."

=== Later life ===
After 1965, Margot Dias collaborated in the foundation of what later became the National Museum of Ethnology in Lisbon and contributed the first object to the ethnographic collection, a container used by Makonde women to fetch water. From 1965 until his death in 1973, Jorge Dias worked as the first director of the ethnographic museum, founded as the Museu de Etnologia do Ultramar (Museum of Ethnology of the Portuguese Overseas Territories). After her husband's death, she continued her ethnological work, publishing studies on the culture of Mozambique.

Karin Schmidt Dias, the daughter of Margot and Jorge Dias, was married in a first marriage to the later President of Portugal, Jorge Sampaio. – In 2001, Margot Dias died at the age of 93 in the small Portuguese town of Óbidos.

== Selected publications ==
=== Monographs and studies ===
- Jorge Dias, Margot Dias, Manuel Viegas Guerreiro: Os Macondes de Moçambique, vol. 1 - 4, 1964/1970. Lisbon: Junta de Investigações do Ultramar, Centre for Cultural Anthropology Studies (ed.). 1168 pp. New edition of the first volume 1998 with an introduction by Rui Pereira).

Margot Dias also published several ethnological studies about her field research in Mozambique and Angola in Portuguese and German:

- Instrumentos musicais de Moçambique. Lisbon: Instituto de Investigação Científica Tropical, 1986.
- O Fenomeno Da Escultura Maconde Chamada 'Moderna'. Lisbon: Junta de Investigacoes do Ultramar 1973.
- Dias, Margot (1982). "Mosambik". In Kubik, Gerhard (ed.). Musikgeschichte in Bildern (in German). Vol. 1. Leipzig: VEB Deutscher Verlag für Musik.

=== Ethnographic documentary films ===
In 2016, the National Museum of Ethnology, the General Directorate of Cultural Heritage and the Cinemateca Portuguesa released 28 ethnographic documentaries filmed by Margot Dias between 1958 and 1961 on DVD, with an introduction and spoken commentary based on her recordings.

== Award and recognition ==
On 4 February 1989, Margot Dias was distinguished as Grand Officer of the Order of Prince Henry by Portuguese President Mário Soares. In her and Benjamim Pereira's honour, the Portuguese Society of Anthropology founded the APA Margot Dias and Benjamim Pereira Prize, which honours work in the field of visual anthropology.

== Reception ==
According to social anthropologist João Leal, Margot Dias was unjustly overshadowed by her husband, and British social anthropologist Harry G. West described this as a common phenomenon among married couples who worked as ethnologists in the first half of the 20th century. While Jorge Dias was seen as the head of the mission and university professor, his wife was the ethnologist who was fascinated by the people and was able to build a relationship with them. She was also particularly interested in women from African ethnic groups. The comprehensive volumes they wrote together on the culture of the Makonde in Mozambique became a reference work for ethnological studies in Portugal. However, she never wanted to complete the planned fifth volume on the sculpture and music of the Makonde, as she would have liked her late husband to co-author it.

The three volumes written by Jorge and Margot Dias on the Makonde of Mozambique were described in reviews by anthropologists in the 1960s as "one of the most important attempts to write indigenous African history" and "among the best-illustrated anthropological volumes ever produced." On the other hand, social anthropologist Susan Drucker criticised the "uncritical use of sources, ethnocentric prejudice, conjecture and literary style" of the text.

Margot Dias's notebooks, more than 1800 films and 6000 sound recordings as well as her technical equipment are kept by the National Museum of Ethnology (MNE) in Lisbon. Her photographic and film documents of ethnographic research have been described by Paulo Costa, Director of the MNE, as "absolutely groundbreaking" and an "extraordinary treasure". In her study "Evidence and Fiction: An Untimely Alliance with the Photography Archive of Margot Dias and Jorge Dias", the artist Catarina Simão used photographs by Jorge and Margot Dias, among others, to examine concepts such as "authenticity" and "coloniality" in the context of visual anthropology.

In 2022, Portuguese film director Catarina Alves Costa released the documentary film Margot, which is based on her previous television documentary. The film covers the life of Margot Dias from her youth in Germany of the 1920s to her ethnological studies with Jorge Dias and includes original photos and film scenes. It has been shown at documentary film festivals in Lisbon, Porto, Munich and Vienna, among others.

== Literature ==
- Macedo, Lurdes; Almeida, Viviane (2024). "Adventures in Mozambique and the Portuguese Tendency to Forget: A Radical Critique of Portuguese Late Colonialism by Ângela Ferreira". Portuguese Studies. 40 (2): 202–217. doi:10.1353/port.00016. ISSN 2222-4270.
- Leal, João (29 June 2023). "Abreise aus Berlin: os últimos meses de Jorge Dias na Alemanha (1943-1944)". Etnografica. 27 (2): 495–525. doi:10.4000/etnografica.14041. ISSN 0873-6561.
- Almeida, Viviane; Zanete, Renata Flaiban; MacEdo, Lurdes (15 June 2023). "Autoria em Margot Dias pela lente revivescente da pós-memória" (PDF). Ex Aequo - Revista da Associação Portuguesa de Estudos Sobre as Mulheres (47): 117–136. doi:10.22355/exaequo.2023.47.09.
- Simão, Catarina (1 December 2021). "Evidence and Fiction: An Untimely Alliance with the Photography Archive of Margot Dias and Jorge Dias". Zeitschrift für Kulturwissenschaften. 15 (2): 167–202. doi:10.14361/zfk-2021-150213. ISSN 2197-9111.
- Margot Dias - Filmes Etnográficos (1958-1961). Museu Nacional de Etnologia. 2014.
- In Step with the Times: Mapiko Masquerades of Mozambique. Ohio University Press. 1 June 2014. ISBN 978-0-8214-4486-3.
