= Gerard Roland Vela =

American microbiologist and community leader

G. Roland Vela
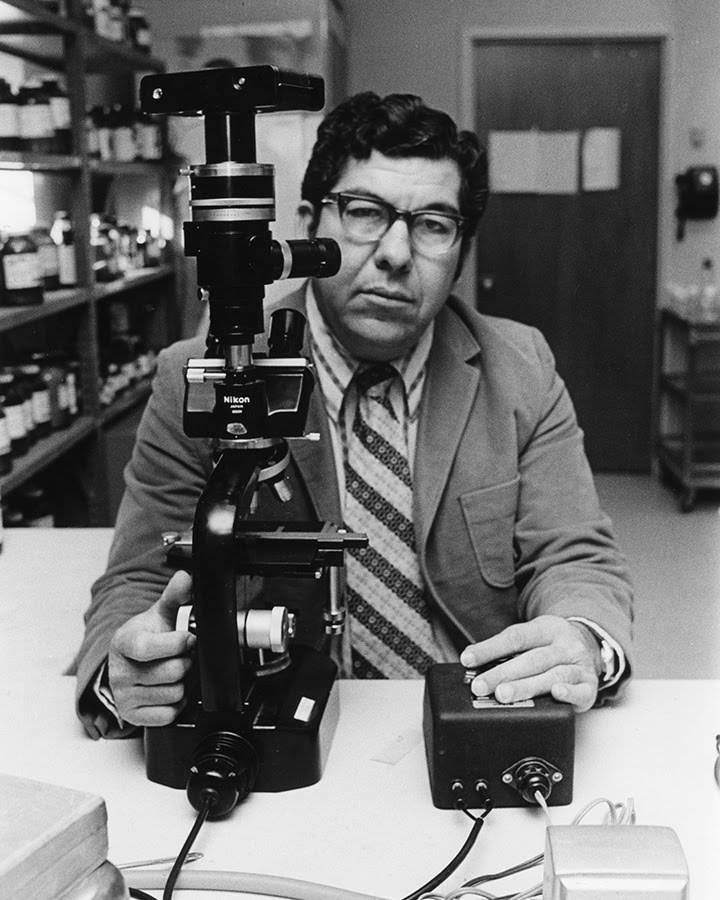
- Born: Gerard Roland Vela; September 18, 1927; Eagle Pass, Texas, U.S.
- Died: January 26, 2021 (aged 93); Denton, Texas, U.S.
- Resting place: Roselawn Memorial Park
- Education: University of Texas at Austin
- Known for: Research on nitrogen-fixing bacteria
- Spouse: Emma Lamar Vela (m. 1953)
- Children: 4
- Awards: Fellow of the American Academy of Microbiology
- Scientific career
- Fields: Microbiology
- Workplaces: University of North Texas
- Military career
- Allegiance: United States
- Branch: United States Navy
- Service years: 1945–1946
- Rank: Seaman first class

Gerard Roland Vela (September 18, 1927 – January 26, 2021), commonly known as G. Roland Vela, was an American microbiologist, university professor, and civic leader. He spent most of his academic career at the University of North Texas, where he became the university's first Latino professor to receive tenure. He was elected a Fellow of the American Academy of Microbiology in 1975. In 1979, he became the first Hispanic member elected to the Denton City Council.

== Early life and education ==
Gerard Roland Vela was born on September 18, 1927, in Eagle Pass, Texas to Marcial Vela Bermea and Maria de Guadalupe Múzquiz de la Garza Vela. However, he spent much of his childhood in San Antonio. Vela attended Stephen F. Austin Elementary School and San Antonio Vocational and Technical High School until April 1945.

Vela enlisted in the United States Navy in 1945 and was stationed at the U.S. Naval Ammunition and Submarine Net Depot in Seal Beach, California, where he worked aboard a tugboat. He was honorably discharged in July 1946 as a seaman first class.

After discharge, he attended San Antonio Junior College, and in 1947, transferred to the University of Texas, where he received a Bachelor of Arts in bacteriology and a minor in chemistry in 1950. In 1951, he received a Master of Arts in the same disciplines. Vela returned to the University of Texas in 1960 and received a doctorate in microbiology with a minor in biochemistry in 1963.

He married Emma Lamar (née Codina Longoria) of Mission, Texas in 1953. They had four children.

== Academic career ==
Vela worked on hormone research at Southwest Foundation for Research and Education in San Antonio before he received a fellowship at the Harvard School of Medicine in 1955. Two years later, he returned to San Antonio and worked as a clinical chemist at Santa Rosa Hospital. In 1963, he entered the Civil Service and worked at Brooks Air Force Base.

In 1965, Vela joined the microbiology faculty of North Texas State University and subsequently became the first Latino professor to receive tenure at the university. During his tenure, Vela participated in the development of North Texas's microbiology research program as the university expanded its scientific research infrastructure. He served as associate dean of the College of Arts and Sciences from 1985 – 1990.

During his 35-year career in microbiology at UNT, Vela supervised 20 doctoral students and 44 master's students. He published 75 research papers and presented more than 100 research reports at international, national, regional, and state scientific societies. Vela was also a visiting professor at universities in Mexico, Thailand, Colombia, Argentina, and Spain, and also taught courses at the University of Texas at Austin for a series of summers.

He retired in 2000 and remained in an emeritus position until 2002.

== Scientific research ==
Vela's research focused on bacterial physiology and soil microbiology, particularly on Azotobacter vinelandii, a free-living nitrogen-fixing bacterium. His work examined the mechanisms by which Azotobacter responded to environmental stresses and changing growth conditions, including radiation, desiccation, nutrient limitation, and the chemical compositions of soils.

During his early research, Vela investigated the resistance and survival of Azotobacter under adverse environmental conditions. In a 1965 study with microbiologist Orville Wyss, he found that Azotobacter populations recovered directly from soil were substantially more resistant to gamma radiation than laboratory-grown cultures. Vela and J.W. Peterson subsequently reported that ultraviolet-inactivated Azotobacter cysts could be reactivated by exposure to white light.

Vela also studied A. vinelandii. Using electron microscopy, Vela, Gerald D. Cagle, and Paul R. Holmgren described previously unreported structural features of vegetative cells and cysts, including fibrils and vesicles within the cyst intine and microtubules within cysts. Later experiments on desiccation demonstrated that cysts of A. vinelandii could remain viable in dried cultures for at least ten years, while vegetative cells maintained under the same conditions did not survive for one year.

Vela's research concerned the effects of nutrient availability on bacterial physiology. In 1979, Vela and colleagues studied A. vinelandii grown under phosphate-limited conditions and found changes in cell-wall structure, oxygen consumption, and the cellular energy balance. Vela's later work increasingly examined Azotobacter in relation to the soil environment. A 1987 study with Fang Jy Wu and Joaquin Moreno, Vela found that A. vinelandii could grow in soil-water media containing little or no carbohydrate by utilizing phenolic acids, soil nitrogen, and water-soluble minerals. The study also found that growth and cell morphology varied with soil composition and that bacterial growth did not necessarily coincide with nitrogen fixation. He later collaborated on research examining the effects of individual soil phenolic acids on the growth and nitrogenase activity of A. vinelandii.

== Civic and community involvement ==
Vela became involved in civic affairs in Denton, where he became the first Hispanic person elected to the Denton City Council in 1979. He served on a number of municipal and regional boards, including the Denton Airport Board, the Denton Forum, and the board of directors of the Texas Municipal Power Agency from 1980 to 1991.

On a national level, he served on committees for the National Science Foundation, the National Institutes of Health, the Environmental Protection Agency, the Department of Education, and the Howard Hughes Medical Institute.

== Later life and legacy ==
Vela authored two textbooks, Practical Microbiology for the Food Professions and Applied Food Microbiology, and two historical biographies, The Men Named Antonio López de Santa Anna and Bernardo de Gálvez: Spanish Hero of the American Revolution, the latter of which he presented to then Prince Felipe VI of Spain.

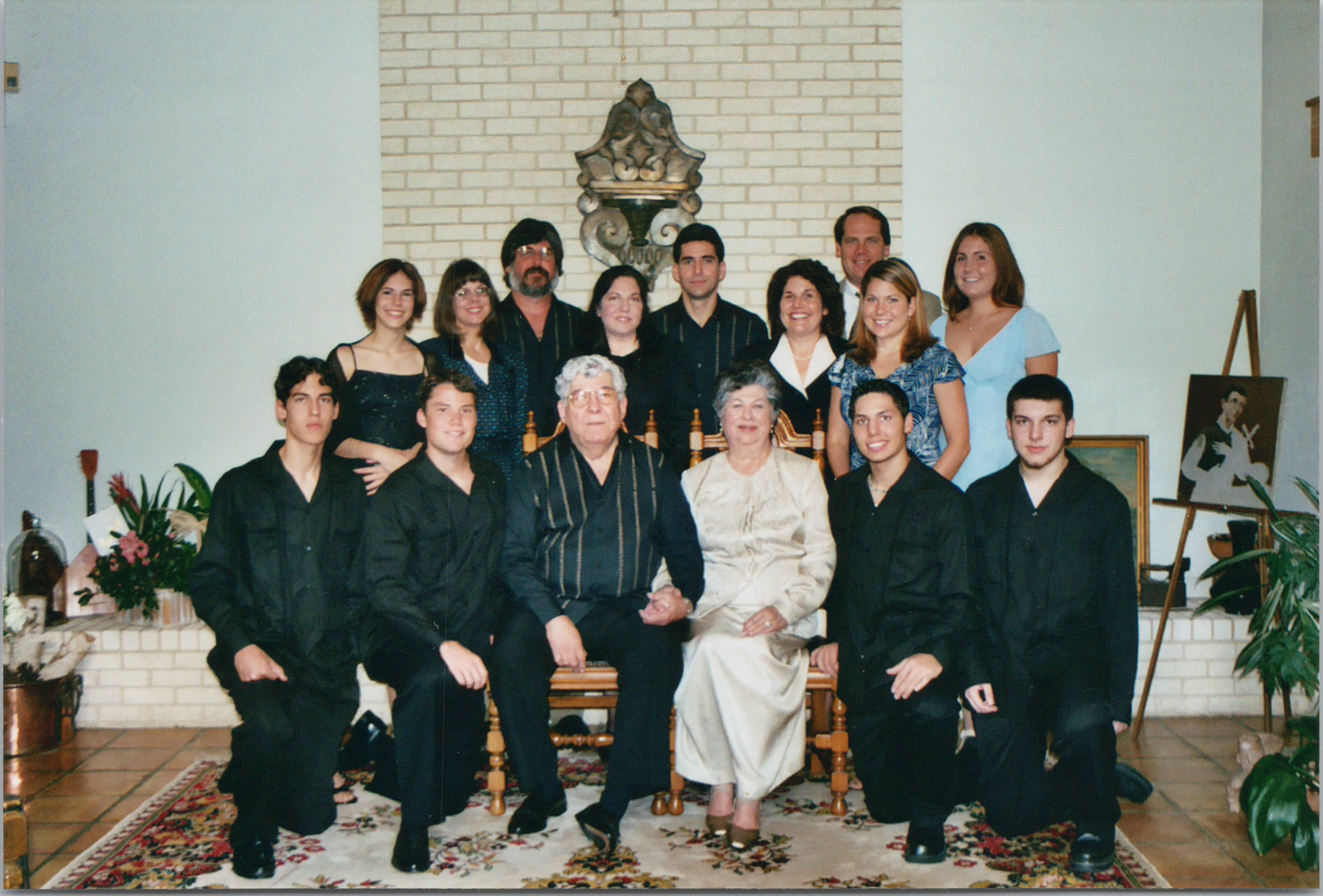
The Dr. Gerard Roland Vela Family

In 1975, he was elected to the American Academy of Microbiology. In 1991, he was the namesake of the G. Roland Vela Award at the University of North Texas. In 1999, research conducted by Vela and his students identified a nitrogen-fixing bacterium proposed under the name Paenibacillus velaei in his honor. In 2000, the Millennium edition of Latino Monthly credited Vela as being one of the "Outstanding 100 Texas Latinos of the Twentieth Century." Vela's papers belong to the University of North Texas Special Collections as the Gerard Roland Vela Múzquiz Papers. In 2019, the G. Roland Vela Athletic Complex opened in Denton, Texas.

He died on January 26, 2021, at his home and is buried at Roselawn Memorial Park, both in Denton.
