= Yossef Av-Gay =

Canadian microbiologist and researcher (born 1961)

Professor Yossef Av-Gay
- יוסף אב-גיא
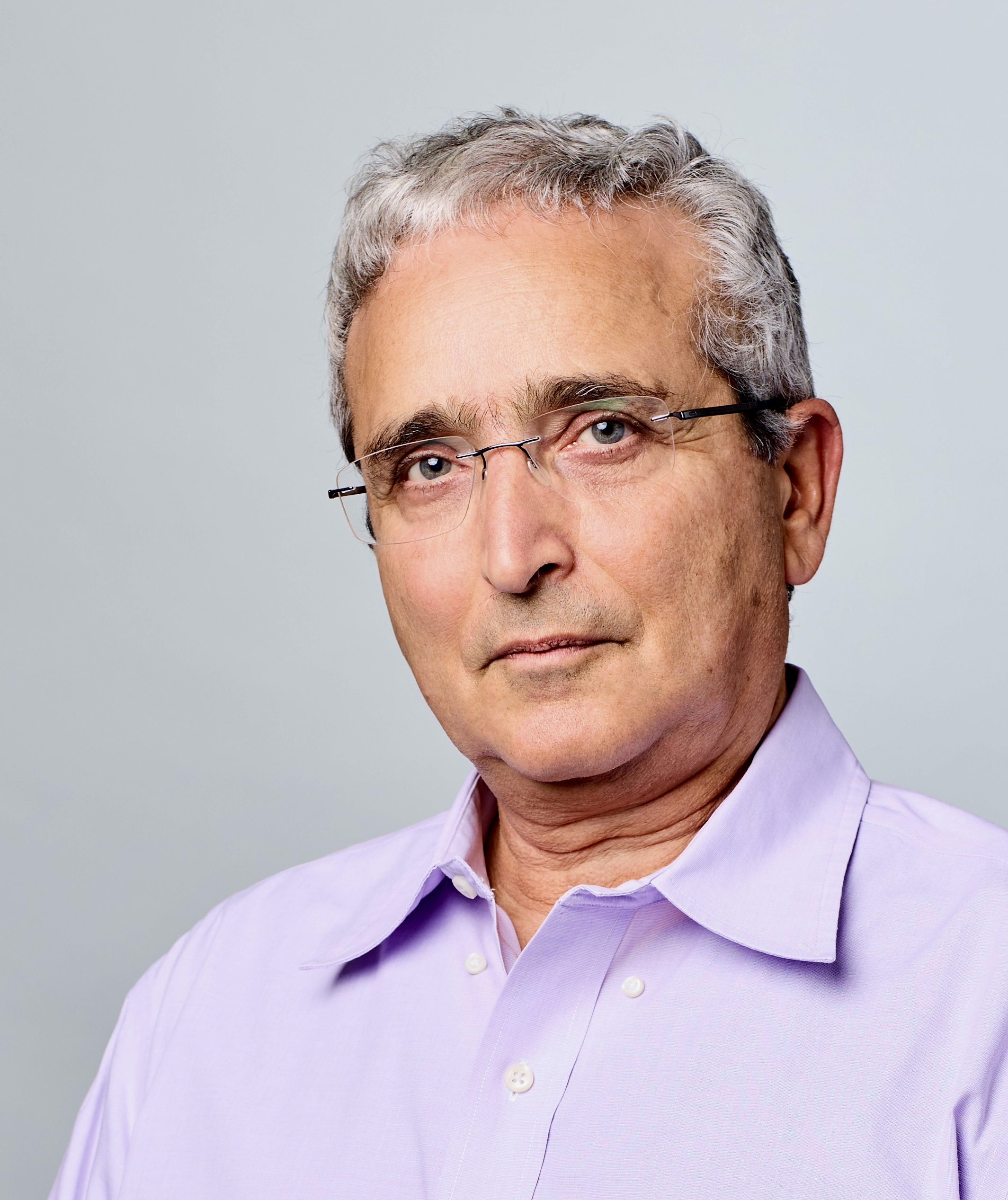
- Born: 1961 (age 64–65)
- Education: Tel Aviv University (BSc, MSc, PhD)
- Occupations: University professor, adjunct professor, researcher, microbiologist
- Years active: 1980–present
- Medical career
- Institutions: University of British Columbia, Canada; Ben-Gurion University of the Negev, Israel
- Research: Microbiology
- Website: https://av-gaylab.med.ubc.ca

Yossef Av-Gay (Hebrew: יוסף אב-גיא; born 1961) is a Canadian microbiologist of Israeli origin. He is a professor of Infectious Diseases in the Faculty of Medicine at the University of British Columbia, Canada. He is also a full member of the department of microbiology and immunology and holds an adjunct professorship at the medical school of Ben-Gurion University of the Negev, Israel.

== Education ==
Av-Gay received his BSc in Biology, MSc in Microbiology, and PhD in Microbial Genetics – all from Tel Aviv University, Israel. He had an advanced training at John Innes Institute, Albert Einstein College of Medicine, New York and the University of British Columbia Department of Microbiology, Vancouver, Canada.

== Research work ==
Prof. Av-Gay has been recognized for his research interests, which lies on diseases including chronic lung diseases, primarily tuberculosis (TB), and nontuberculous mycobacteria (NTM) diseases. He explores molecular events that govern host-pathogen interactions and the ability of mycobacteria to block the innate immune response to infection.

Av-Gay's research is geared towards the discovery, identification and characterization of novel drugs and drug targets in Mycobacterium tuberculosis, and COVID-19.

His pioneering discovery of the "eukaryotic like" protein kinases and phosphatases in Mycobacterium tuberculosis opened a new field of signal transduction research in this pathogen. In a series of publications, he and his team have shown that these proteins control key properties of Mtb physiology including virulence, dormancy, amino acid metabolism, cell wall biosynthesis and aspects of antibiotic resistance in response to external stimuli such as nitric oxide and antibiotics. They further showed that these kinases are modulators of phase separation and clustering of an ABC transporter in Mtb. His early works also characterized and identified mycothiol (MSH) biosynthetic pathway in Mycobacteria. Mtb utilizes the glutathione's (GSH) thiol analogs mycothiol and ergothioneine (EGT) to neutralize xenobiotics and free radicals. His research group further demonstrated that MSH is a key cyto-protectant in Mtb, and EGT has a role in persistence and long-term infection of macrophages.

Av-Gay's most significant discovery was the identification and characterization of PtpA, a protein phosphatase in Mtb which inhibits the normal macrophage innate response to infection. PtpA interferers with the macrophage signalling machinery, modulating GSK3 phosphorylation and enabling Mtb replication within it. His research suggested that targeting PtpA and its substrates can be considered a novel approach for TB drug development.

Av-Gay authored over 100 peer review scientific publications, review articles, book chapters and 15 patents; he served as an editor for the Journal of Biological Chemistry (2010–2015), and board of scientific advisory of several biotechnology companies. Av-Gay is a member of the scientific review panels of the Canadian Institutes of Health Research (2009–2016) and Foundation and Project Grants (2016-), the French Agence nationale de la recherche, Innovative Medicine Innovations, The UK welcome Trust, US National Institutes of Health, and the European Commission FP6, FP7 and Horizon 2020 programs. He is also the founder of two startup companies Enox Biopharma and the NASDAQ traded company Beyond Air.
