= Fox Tech High School =

Fox Technical High School

Location
- 637 North Main Avenue; San Antonio, Bexar County, Texas 78205; United States; 29.432384°N 98.494501°W

Information
- School type: Public, high school
- Locale: City: Large
- School district: San Antonio ISD
- NCES School ID: 483873004350
- Principal: Jennifer Benavides
- Faculty: 28.74 (on an FTE basis)
- Grades: 9–12
- Enrollment: 499 (2022–2023)
- Student to teacher ratio: 17.36
- Colors: Red and white
- Team name: Buffaloes
- Website: Official Website

Fox Technical High School is a public high school located in central San Antonio, Texas and classified as a 4A school by the University Interscholastic League. This school is one of twelve schools in the San Antonio Independent School District. During 2022–2023, Fox Tech High School had an enrollment of 499 students and a student to teacher ratio of 17.36. The school received an overall rating of "B" from the Texas Education Agency for the 2024–2025 school year.

== History ==
San Antonio High School was established in 1882. In 1917, it was rebuilt and renamed Main Avenue High School. In 1932, the campus was repurposed as a vocational school, and at that time it acquired its present name, Fox Technical High School. Students from the old Main Avenue High School who intended to continue pursuing academic studies were sent to the newly built Thomas Jefferson High School.

In 2017, The Centers for Applied Science and Technology (CAST) opened a charter school in Fox Tech's two freshly-renovated buildings, which were the Freshman buildings. This CAST school was named CAST Tech which uses computer-based learning to allow students to progress more quickly in areas where they have mastered concepts, allowing them to dive more deeply into projects and areas of great interest.

== Athletics ==
The Fox Tech Buffaloes compete in the following sports:

- Basketball
- Cross country
- Golf
- Swimming and diving
- Tennis
- Track and field
- Volleyball
- Water polo

== Alumni ==
=== San Antonio High School ===
- Eudochia Bell Smith, society editor at the San Antonio Express and state legislator in Colorado
- Gerard Roland Vela, microbiologist
- Ivan Johnson, NBA player for Atlanta hawks
- Lee Patton, former student, legendary basketball coach at West Virginia University.
- Nickie Valdez, LGBTQ activist and community leader
