= Nickie Valdez =

American LGBT activist (1940-2020)

- Born: Mary Irma Valdez; September 10, 1940; San Antonio, Texas
- Died: December 25, 2020 (aged 80); San Antonio, Texas
- Occupations: Activist, church worker, community leader
- Spouse: Deborah Meyers

Mary Irma "Nickie" Valdez (September 10, 1940 – December 25, 2020) was an American LGBTQ activist and church worker. Valdez was co-founder and longtime president of Dignity San Antonio, and was first co-chair of the San Antonio Equal Rights Political Caucus. She was also active with Pax Christi, the Esperanza Peace and Justice Center, and Progressive Religious Organizations of San Antonio (PRO SA).

== Early life and education ==
Valdez was born in San Antonio, Texas. She was raised by her aunt and her grandmother. Her father was a tailor and a veteran of the United States Navy. She graduated from Fox Tech High School in San Antonio in 1961; her father would not consent to her attending college.

== Career ==
In the 1960s, Valdez met with gay and lesbian Catholics who felt rejected or otherwise unwelcome in their church, sometimes informally on church steps, and later in meetings and Bible studies. She volunteered for a peer hotline run by the San Antonio Free Clinic in the 1970s, and published a community newsletter from 1973 to 1976.

In 1976, Valdez participated in San Antonio's first Pride march. She helped to organize the Forward Foundation, which hosted a local conference on gay rights called "A Sense of Belonging", with speakers including Del Martin and Elaine Noble. She and Bruce Jarstfer founded Dignity San Antonio in 1976, and she was Dignity San Antonio's president for decades. In 1977 she taught a basic carpentry course, as a fundraiser for the National Organization for Women.

Valdez was a member of the San Antonio Equal Rights Political Caucus, and Progressive Religious Organizations of San Antonio (PRO SA). She served on the board of DignityUSA from 1997 to 2001. She also worked with Pax Christi at the national and local levels. She was named Peace Laureate of San Antonio in 2019.

== Personal life ==
Valdez and her partner Georgina "Jeanie" Minor had a son, Robert (1971–1988), and ran a gallery and framing shop together in the 1970s. Valdez and her longtime partner Deborah Meyers married in a private religious ceremony in 1989, and married legally in 2015. Valdez died in 2020, at the age of 80, from multiple myeloma, in San Antonio.
