= Walter Frank =

German Nazi historian

Walter Frank, also known by the pseudonym Werner Fiedler (12 February 1905 in Fürth – 9 May 1945 in Gross Brunsrode near Braunschweig), was a National Socialist historian, notable for his leading role in research of the Jewish question.

== Life ==
Frank was born in Fürth, Kingdom of Bavaria. In his youth, he attended Julius Streicher rallies; his politics were heavily influenced by the Bavarian Soviet Republic and the Beer Hall Putsch. In 1923, Frank started to study history at the Ludwig-Maximilians-Universität München under Hermann Oncken, Karl Haushofer, and Karl Alexander von Müller. He earned his PhD in 1927 with a dissertation about Adolf Stoecker. His doctoral advisor was Müller, who was antisemitic and supportive of Adolf Hitler. He was increasingly active in the Nazi movement, and published many antisemitic works. He was director of the Reichsinstitut für Geschichte des neuen Deutschlands ("Reich Institute for History of the New Germany", sometimes referred to as "Frank's Institute") from its opening in 1935. The institute's goal was to create a new, proper, Nazi-based historiography and study the "Jewish question"; this area had its own sub-institute from 1936. Frank was a protégée of Alfred Rosenberg, one of Nazism's chief ideologues. Notable Nazi historians working in the institute included Karl Alexander von Müller, Erich Marks and Heinrich von Srbik. Frank committed suicide at Brunsrode near Braunschweig in 1945, believing the world to be senseless after the death of Hitler.

== Works ==
- Hofprediger Adolf Stoecker und die christlichsoziale Bewegung. Verlag von Reimar Hobbing, Berlin 1928. ("Chaplain Adolf Stoecker and the Christian-Social Movement")
- Händler und Soldaten. Frankreich und die Judenfrage in der "Affäre Dreyfus". Hanseatische Verlagsanstalt, Hamburg 1933.("Dealers and Soldiers. France and the Jewish Question in the Dreyfus Affair")
- Nationalismus und Demokratie im Frankreich der dritten Republik (1871 bis 1918). Hanseatische Verlagsanstalt, Hamburg 1933. ("Nationalism and Democracy in the French Third Republic")
- Franz Ritter von Epp. Der Weg eines deutschen Soldaten. Hanseatische Verlagsanstalt, Hamburg 1934. ("Franz Ritter von Epp. The Way of a German Soldier")
- Geist und Macht. Historisch-politische Aufsätze. Hanseatische Verlagsanstalt, Hamburg 1938. ("Mind and Power. Historico-Political Essays")
- "Höre Israel!" Studien zur modernen Judenfrage. Hanseatische Verlagsanstalt, Hamburg 1939. ("Listen Israel!" Studies about the Modern Jewish Question")
- Der Panama-Skandal. Hanseatische Verlagsanstalt, Hamburg 1942. ("The Panama Scandal")
- Adolf Hitler. Vollender des Reichs. Manuskript, 1944. ("Adolf Hitler. Completer of the Reich")

== Quotation ==
- "Only since then [1941] it is obvious, that this war is not fought for a Great German Empire in Europe, but for Europe on the whole; that this is the last and largest of the Catalaunian Battles and will decide whether this continent, that shaped the world and its appearance will persist or be destroyed. Attila and Genghis Khan now ride exultingly next to Stalin’s armies over the Eastern plains, they appear as the Horsemen of the Apocalypse in fiery skies during the nights of bombing.
  Yet just like in the distant past the Romans and Germanic peoples stood up against Attila and like the Germanic and Slavic peoples stood up against the Mongols, so now on the German side Legions of Germanic, Slavic, and Romanic blood have risen to save Europe." (in: Adolf Hitler. Vollender des Reichs. 1944)
  - "Erst seitdem [1941] ist es klar, dass dieser Krieg nicht nur um ein Großreich der Deutschen in Europa geführt wird, sondern um Europa überhaupt; dass er die letzte und größte der „Katalaunischen Schlachten“ ist und darüber entscheidet, ob dieser Erdteil, der der ganzen Welt ihr Antlitz gab, bestehen bleiben oder vernichtet werden soll. Attila und Dschingiskhan traben heute wild jauchzend neben den Heeren Stalins über die östlichen Steppen, sie erscheinen als apokalyptische Reiter am Flammenhimmel unserer Bombennächte.
    Aber wie einst Römer und Germanen gegen Attila standen und Germanen und Slawen gegen die Mongolen, so haben sich auch heute an der Seite der Deutschen die Legionen germanischen, slawischen, romanischen Blutes erhoben, um Europa zu retten."

== See also ==
- Institute for Study of the Jewish Question
