= Eudochia Bell Smith =

American politician (1887–1977)

Eudochia Bell Smith (September 9, 1887 - September 23, 1977) was a newspaper reporter and editor, state legislator, and federal official in Colorado. She pushed for reform of juvenile incarceration, food safety standards, and women on juries. She served in the Colorado House of Representatives and then the Colorado Senate. A Democrat, she served in the Colorado Senate from 1941 to 1946. She was inducted into the Colorado Women's Hall of Fame.

Eudochia Bell was born in San Antonio, Texas. She studied at Ursuline Academy and San Antonio High School. She was Society Editor for the San Antonio Express.
