= Peter Wall Institute for Advanced Studies =

Research institute at the University of British Columbia

Coordinates: 49.26890°N 123.25715°W

The Peter Wall Institute for Advanced Studies (PWIAS) was founded in 1991 and was a research institute at the University of British Columbia. It supported basic research through collaborative, interdisciplinary initiatives. The institute brought together UBC scholars with researchers from around the world "to work together on innovative research, develop new thinking that is beyond disciplinary boundaries, and engage in intellectual risk-taking." The institute had a varied program of scholars in residence, visiting scholars, distinguished professorship, multiple speaker series, and major special events.

UBC announced3 that PWIAS programming was discontinued on August 31, 2023. It was dis-established by the UBC Senate in April 2024.

== History ==
In 1991, Vancouver property developer Peter Wall donated 6.5 million shares of the Wall Financial Corporation (at the time, it was worth CAD$15 million and the largest private donation received by the University of British Columbia) to fund the Peter Wall Institute for Advanced studies, which had been conceived by Wall and then UBC President David Strangway. Strangway was quoted as saying, "Peter realized that there was an opportunity to create a university-based institute for advanced research which doesn't exist anywhere else. He made it clear from the outset that the money had to be used to generate new ideas and initiatives that wouldn't happen otherwise." As of March 2007, the market value of the shares stood at CAD$48 million. Also in 1994, the university dedicated a CAD$10 million Peter Wall Institute for Advanced Studies Endowment Fund to the institute.

The institute began active operations in 1994 with the appointments of UBC Nobel Laureate in Chemistry Michael Smith (1932–2000), and Prof. Raphael Amit, then director of UBC's W. Maurice Young Entrepreneurship and Venture Capital Research Centre, as Peter Wall Distinguished Professors. The institute's first full-time director was Kenneth MacCrimmon from 1996 to 2002. The institute acquired its own facilities at the Leon & Thea Koerner University Centre in 1999. In 2002, the institute appointed as its new Peter Wall Distinguished Professor Dr. Brett Finlay, who teaches in the department of biochemistry & molecular biology, the department of microbiology & immunology, and at the Finlay Lab at the Michael Smith Laboratories at UBC, and whose research led to the developments of vaccines for SARS and E. coli.

The institute was a member of University-Based Institutes of Advanced Study (UBIAS) network and hosted its International Conference on September 17–19, 2013. It concluded Memoranda of Understanding with the Collège de France in 2008, the Stellenbosch Institute for Advanced Study (STIAS) in 2009, and the TUM Institute for Advanced Study in 2010. According to Chris McGill, who was assistant to the director from 1999 to 2004, The Institute was not modelled on a particular centre or institute. The individuals involved in establishing the Peter Wall Institute and in developing its programs looked at a number of different models. The Rockefeller Foundation's Bellagio Study & Conference Center at Lake Como, the Institute for Advanced Study in Princeton, the Santa Fe Institute in New Mexico, and the Center for Advanced Study in the Behavioral Sciences at Stanford were some of the facilities that were considered. By trying to adapt elements from each of these centres and institutes to the particular mandate of the Peter Wall Institute we have created a new and original form of research institute."

The most recent director of the institute was Dr. Philippe Tortell, a professor in the Departments of Botany and Earth, Ocean & Atmospheric Sciences at the University of British Columbia. Dr. Tortell resigned in November 2018 in protest against directives from the board of trustees, which he viewed as "wholly inconsistent with its mission and mandate".

== Programs ==
The institute's programs included:

- The Peter Wall Distinguished Professorship. The university describes this as "one of UBC's highest honours". The current Peter Wall Distinguished Professors are Brett Finlay, Biochemistry & Molecular Biology and Microbiology & Immunology, and Derek Gregory, Geography. Brett Finlay is a microbiologist and Officer of the Order of Canada. "This is huge," Finlay was quoted as saying upon receiving the professorship. "The Peter Wall Institute is a really special place at the University of British Columbia." Finlay's recent work is on vaccines to combat E. coli and SARS. Derek Gregory is an internationally renowned scholar in both the social sciences and the humanities. His appointment is for a five-year term, effective 1 July 2011. In 2014, UBC Law Professor Janis Sarra was appointed UBC Presidential Distinguished Professor on a three-year term.
- The Distinguished Visiting Professor program. Past visitors include intellectual historian Arif Dirlik (2005), Nobel prize-winning chemist Roald Hoffman (2008), neurophysiologist Alain Berthoz (in 2009), computer scientist Barbara Grosz (2010), cognitive neuroscientist Stanislas Dehaene (2011), microbiologist Philippe Sansonetti (2011), sinologist Anne Cheng (2013), anthropologist Philippe Descola (2013), mathematical physicist Peter Goddard (2013), physicist Serge Haroche (2015), mathematician Karl Sigmund (2016), and legal scholar Alain Supiot (2016).
- "The Wall Exchange" Downtown Public Lecture Series. The institute brings prominent public intellectuals to give a free public lecture and forum at the Vogue Theatre in downtown Vancouver twice per year. The inaugural event took place May 2011 with guest speaker Craig Venter, leading genomic scientist and sequencer of the human genome, on the construction of the first synthetic cell and the global ocean sampling expedition. Past speakers include geographer and Peter Wall Distinguished Professor Derek Gregory (2011), philosopher and gender theorist Judith Butler (2012), cosmologist and astrophysicist Martin Rees (2012), microbiologist and Peter Wall Distinguished Professor Brett Finlay (2013), philosopher and anthropologist Bruno Latour (2013), politician and United Nations special envoy Stephen Lewis (2014), molecular biologist Bonnie Bassler (2015), architect Eyal Weizman (2015), historian of science Naomi Oreskes (2016), and anthropologist Gabriella Coleman Gabriella Coleman (2016).
- The Wall Scholars program. Based on the combination of discontinued programs (Early Career Scholars, Distinguished Scholars in Residence, and Research Mentorship Awards), the Wall Scholars Research Award (worth $20,000) is given to exceptional UBC faculty, in any discipline and at any stage of their careers, to stay in residence at the institute for one year and participate in a collaborative, interdisciplinary research environment. Part of the Wall Scholars program includes the Wall Wednesday Afternoon Series, an annual series of public forums held by each of the current Wall Scholars on a topic of their choice.
- The International Visiting Research Scholar program. Select UBC faculty are granted partnership awards of $10,000 to bring an international scholar to UBC for a minimum of three weeks to collaborate on interdisciplinary research projects.
- The International Research Roundtable program. The institute funds and hosts up to five roundtables per year, during which local, national and international scholars, community leaders, artists, policy makers, and others come together in the pursuit of knowledge within an interdisciplinary environment. The roundtables foster collaborative, interdisciplinary approaches towards research centered on a broad-ranging theme, and may lead to important advances in science or solutions to important problems. The first International Roundtable Discussion, titled, "Rising from the Ashes: Resilience, Arts and Social Transformation," was held in October 2012.
- The institute has partnered with the Consulate General of France in Vancouver to bring leading French scholars to UBC in a program titled "French Scholars Lecture Series / Cycle de conférenciers français à l'université de Colombie-Britannique", inviting academics from France, from different disciplinary and research backgrounds, to participate in a dialogue with their Canadian counterparts.
- International Exchanges. The institute can welcome each year outstanding professors from the Collège de France within the context of its invited Wall Distinguished Visiting Professor program, and in turn, the Collège can invite up to three senior faculty associates of the institute for one month under the rubric of its International Exchanges program. The Stellenbosch Institute for Advanced Study (STIAS) welcomes senior faculty associates of the institute for fellowships of three months or longer. The institute and TUM Institute for Advanced Study will arrange annual brief exchanges of small, interdisciplinary research clusters with interests in a common topic.
- Wall Colloquia Abroad. These are small meetings to which scholars from a range of disciplines, from UBC and abroad, are brought together for a few days to develop and further research agendas on cutting edge topics. Holding the meetings in other parts of the world will enable key researchers to attend who might otherwise not be able to do so.
- Theme Development Workshops. The institute provides a venue and refreshments to UBC faculty who wish to meet and discuss potential collaborative research projects, themes, and research funding proposals involving multiple academic disciplines and faculties.
- Arts-Based Initiatives. Researchers at the Peter Wall Institute have adapted arts-based approaches (drama, poetry, visual arts, dance and song) to offer alternative ways of exploring important research questions as well as disseminating research findings to diverse audiences. The institute has hosted a Wall Composer in Residence, Wall Author in Residence, Wall International Visiting Artists, as well as a large number of arts-based forums and performances.
