= Vilarinho da Furna =

- Vila/Town
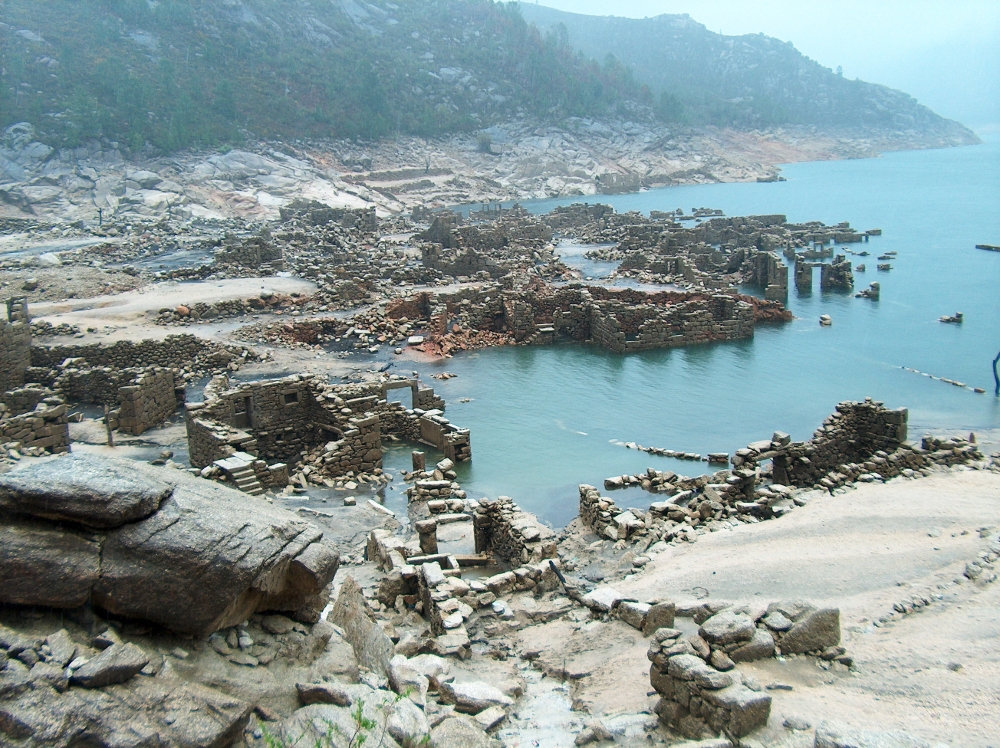
- The ruins of Vilarinho da Furna during the dry season, when the former-village becomes exposed

- Location of the village of Vilarinho da Furna
- Country: Portugal
- Region: Norte
- Subregion: Oeste
- District: Braga
- Municipality: Terras de Bouro
- Vilarinho da Furna: 1st Century
- Elevation: 43 m (141 ft)

Population (1967)
  - Total: 300
- Demonym: Vilarense
- Time zone: UTC0 (WET)
  - Summer (DST): UTC+1 (WEST)
- ISO 3166 code: PT
- Several versions of the village's name exist: Vilarinho da Furna, Vilarinho das Furnas, Vilarinho, Villarinho, Vilarinho de Furmas, Villarinho da Furna and Villarinho das Furnas. The villagers and residents of nearby villages generally know it as Vilarinho da Furna. "Das Furnas" is probably a reference to the rock cavities found near the spring of Rio de Furnas.

Vilarinho da Furna (alternately called Vilarinho das Furnas) was a former village, located in the civil parish of Campo de Gerês, in the municipality of Terras de Bouro, in the northern Portuguese district of Braga. Located on the banks of the rivers Homem and Ribeira do Eido, in 1972, it was intentionally submerged by the Portuguese state during the course of filling a reservoir of the same name. Although still legally held by the former villages, the lands are inundated and the ruins of the former village are only visible during the dry season, when it emerges as a tourist attraction.

== History ==
Oral tradition suggests that the village was founded in the 1st century during the Visigothic settlement of the region, a time when the nearby Roman road (Via Nova XVIII) was extended. According to this history, seven men settled present-day Portela do Campo, but following a dispute, four decided to settle downstream of the Rio Homem, establishing Vilarinho da Furna. Little evidence exists to support this story, although there are several Roman roads and bridges within the region, including two roads to the south and three bridges (one within the village that crosses the Ribeira do Eido, one upstream (the Ponta Nova) and one downstream (Ponte do Couço).

Little is known about its status during the Roman occupation, although it was first referenced in 1623, in the church register of baptisms.

A German traveller who visited Vilarinho da Furna in the final years of the 18th century noted that the houses were comparable to those of other peasants in the region. His large host family lived comfortably; in contrast to many other places, they had no shortage of food and their beds were clean and made-up with white linens. He commented that many German peasants would envy the high standard of living in the village.

=== Flood ===
Planning for a fresh-water reservoir and dam began in the 1950s, with surveys and test drilling. Construction started in 1967. At this time, the village had almost 300 inhabitants in 57 families spread across 80 houses.

The exodus started in September 1969, when the former Companhia Portuguesa de Electricidade (Portuguese Electricity Company) started to pay out indemnity fees to the village residents. The villagers received a total of 20,741,607 escudos: excluding houses and other structures, the land itself was valued by HICA - Companhia Hidroeléctrica do Cavado (Cavado Hydroelectric Company) at .5 escudos 1 square metre (11 ft^{2}), equivalent to the price of half a sardine. When including all structures, the compensation was equivalent to 5 escudos 1 square metre (11 ft^{2}), which was less than the cost that HICA incurred to build houses for its workers. In October 1970, notices were posted throughout the village stating that the reservoir would be filled. Before the dam was built, all roads leading to the village were constructed by the villagers. The dam construction company attempted to build a new road to evacuate the villagers, but this attempt failed. In the end, the villagers had to construct a new road to allow them to take their belongings by truck from the village. Residents tried to take away as much of their belongings as possible (even the roof tiles); only the bare walls of most of the houses were left behind. The last inhabitant left in 1971 and the village was submerged the following year.

The reservoir covers an area of approximately 344 hectares (37,000,000 ft^{2}), with a useful reservoir capacity of 69.7 cubic hectometres (2.46×10^{9} ft^{3}), as well as a maximum power capacity of 125 MW.

=== Aftermath ===
In 1981, the municipality of Terras de Bouro built an Ethnographic museum in São João do Campo that commemorates the history of Vilarinho da Furna. The collection includes clothes, agricultural tools, and paintings depicting daily life in the village. The museum was built with stones from two houses of the old village. It was opened by Prime Minister Aníbal Cavaco Silva on 14 May 1989.

In 2008, Terras de Bouro launched the project Valorização do Espaço Natural da Serra da Amarela (Serra da Amarela Natural Space Appreciation), based on the Parque Natural de Vilarinho da Furna (Nature Park of Vilarinho da Furna) that includes an underwater museum, a glass-bottom boat and wharf, a wildlife observation post, two mountain shelters, water and solar energy installations to provide energy for the park, beehives, a campsite and a bike path, as well as the re-reconstruction of the old bridge at Couço and the watermills in the area. The project was approved in July 2008 and funded 1.2 million euros budget over a period of 2 years, although it is estimated that another 2-3 million Euros would be needed to cover the expenses of the buildings and access roads. The municipalities of Terras de Bouro and Ponte da Barca also jointly developed a hiking route along Serra da Amarela that crossed Chã da Fonte, Casa da Neve, Branca de Bilhares, Entre-ambos-os-Rios, Germil, Brufe, Casarotas, Fojo do Lobos and back to Vilarinho da Furna.

In October 1985, the former villagers created the Associação dos Antigos Habitantes de Vilarinho da Furna (Association of Former-Inhabitants of Vilarinho da Furna) to defend and promote the cultural, collective and communitarian heritage of the people of the old village. Some of its goals, such as the reforestation of the old lands, the creation of animal reserve, the development of an underwater museum and tourist activities, have been realized by the organization.

== Geography ==
Vilarinho da Furna was situated in the southern slopes of Serra Amarela, providing the village with both good solar exposure and protection from the northerly winds from the higher mountains. Local springs did not dry out during the summers and fertile soils were located in upstream locations whose sediments were deposited during regular floods. The Ribeira da Furna fed the community spring, while levadas provide water through a controlled system of sluice gates, that allow channeled the water supply to village and cattle, as well as field irrigation below the village. The trees in the small valleys provided shade for them in the hot months of late summer. Pasturelands on hilltop, at most 1,300 metres (4,300 ft) above sea level, are predominantly sparse, with poor soils and exposed outcrops. Only a small portion of land in the lower, gentle slopes were suitable for hay and foraging cattle.

These circumstance provided the ideal conditions for a diverse local agriculture, supporting the cultivation of maize on small plots (or gardens) interspersed with small vineyards (to make vinho verde, the typical wine of the Minho region). Many of the villagers kept domesticated animals (chickens, cows, pigs, sheep and goats).

In order to avoid occupying arable land, the houses in the village were constructed side-by-side, thereby defining inter-community streets, alleys and the common spaces (including the alpendoradas, in which the Junta gathered). Due to the lack of space within the village, many of the houses overhung the streets.

The lands belonging to Vilarinho da Furna encompass an area of approximately 3,000 hectares (320,000,000 ft^{2}). In 1895, after a dispute with the Serviços Florestais (Forest Services) much of the land became the shared private property of those descendants of the villagers who had signed a contract, ending the dispute.

== Culture ==
Had the village not been submerged by the reservoir, it might have been completely forgotten. The construction of the dam made scientists take notice of the village and its communitarian social system, which was uncommon in the 20th century, but which in remote times was found throughout Europe.

The village had a council, called the Junta, with a member for each family. This is believed to be a practice dating back to the Visigoths, with their conventus publicus vicinorum (public assembly of neighbours). The Junta's leader (Zelador, or Juíz) was chosen from among the married men, and sat for a term of six months together with its legislative chamber (Os Seis). At the beginning of each term all voters one by one went into a room with the new Zelador and gave him a note with name of six of the neighbours to elect the new "Os Seis". In a tradition that was abandoned already when the ethnographer Jorge Dias was around, the old Zelador would give the new Zelador a whip upon which the new would swear an oath on the Santos Evangelhos. The council discussed and made decisions concerning many aspects of village life, discussing some matters in great detail. This discussion at the council made Vilarinho da Furna a participatory democracy based on its consuetudinary laws.

Matters discussed by the Junta included preparing new routes and repairing existing ones; organising the pastoral duties, including the herding of the cattle; irrigating the fields; cutting wood and clearing forests; trapping wolves; and harvesting grapes. In essence, the Junta was charged with making sure that nothing went undone in this largely self-sustaining community. In the last years of the village's existence, the Junta also devoted itself to devising strategies to fight its final enemy, the company that constructed the dam.

The Junta also judged and punished any crimes; thus the leader was referred to as the Judge (juiz). Absence from meetings of the Junta was punished: slight delays were fined; for absences, the offender owed the village one day of community work. The most severe punishment for any transgression within the community was to be excluded from it (botar fora do vizinho). The offender would not receive any help within the scope of the communitarian lifestyle, so no one else would herd his cattle; and he would be denied access to the communal land. In essence, this meant exile from the village.

The village's economy was based on cattle. In 1968, the herd consisted of over 1600 head, not counting calves born in that year. At the end of World War II, the count was almost 1000 head higher, as a result of the high price of domestically produced meat. Little beef or butter was found on the village's tables, and milk was only taken after calving; the focus was on feeding cattle for sale. Cattle were generally pastured in the lower lands; goats were kept up on the hills. The cow pastures were divided by stone fences to avoid mixing the animals, in particular to separate the castrated cattle from the bulls to avoid upsetting the latter. The villagers took turns herding, so that everyone had to spend time away from the village. A herder was fined if it was determined that an animal had been killed or had disappeared through his fault or negligence. Villagers in the fields prepared supper for those who watched the herds. The mountains around the village, especially Serra da Amarela, have a number of small huts (casarotas) as temporary lodging for the herders. Every spring the villagers went out to mend the stone fence that defined the outer perimeter of the land (termo).
