= Inna Sekirov =

Canadian medical microbiologist

Inna Sekirov is a Moldovan-born, Canadian medical microbiologist and physician-scientist at the University of British Columbia.

== Biography ==
Sekirov was born in Moldova and moved to Vancouver, British Columbia, Canada in 1995. She attended the University of British Columbia (UBC) and graduated with a BS in Microbiology and Immunology in 2003. Sekirov carried out her PhD work at the Brett Finlay lab as a Michael Smith Foundation for Health Research Senior Graduate Trainee. She then went on to complete her medical microbiology residency graduating with her PhD, MD, and FRCPC at UBC in 2011.

She remained at UBC after graduation and became the Program Head for Tuberculosis (TB)/Mycobacteriology at the British Columbia Centre for Disease Control, and a Clinical Assistant Professor of Pathology and Laboratory Medicine at UBC. Her research focused on the public health-related aspects of medical microbiology, clinical applications of microbial genomics and TB/mycobacteriology diagnostic methods.

She has also led COVID-19 research projects on ACEII, antibody responses, and seroprevalence using dried blood spots.

== Selected works ==
- Coburn, Bryan, Inna Sekirov, and B. Brett Finlay. "Type III secretion systems and disease." Clinical microbiology reviews 20, no. 4 (2007): 535-549.
- Sekirov, Inna, Nicola M. Tam, Maria Jogova, Marilyn L. Robertson, Yuling Li, Claudia Lupp, and B. Brett Finlay. "Antibiotic-induced perturbations of the intestinal microbiota alter host susceptibility to enteric infection." Infection and immunity 76, no. 10 (2008): 4726-4736.
- Sekirov, Inna, Shannon L. Russell, L. Caetano M. Antunes, and B. Brett Finlay. "Gut microbiota in health and disease." Physiological reviews (2010).
- Skowronski, Danuta M., Inna Sekirov, Suzana Sabaiduc, Macy Zou, Muhammad Morshed, David Lawrence, Kate Smolina et al. "Low SARS-CoV-2 sero-prevalence based on anonymized residual sero-survey before and after first wave measures in British Columbia, Canada, March-May 2020." MedRxiv (2020): 2020-07.
