= Jorge Dias (ethnologist) =

Portuguese ethnologist (1907–1973)

Jorge Dias ComSE GCIH
- Born: 31 July 1907; Porto, Portugal
- Died: 5 February 1973 (aged 65); Lisbon, Portugal
- Other name: António Jorge Dias
- Years active: 1945–1973
- Spouse: Margot Dias

Academic background
- Education: University of Coimbra; Ludwig-Maximilians-Universität München
- Thesis: Vilarinho da Furna: Um Povo Autárquico na Serra da Amarela (1944)
- Doctoral advisor: Gerhard Rohlfs
- Other advisors: Hans Rheinfelder; Otto Höfler; Herbert Cysarz; Karl Alexander von Müller

Academic work
- Notable works: Os Macondes de Moçambique

António Jorge Dias (31 July 1907 – 5 February 1973) was a Portuguese ethnologist. He is mainly known for his ethnographic fieldwork in the late 1950s during Portuguese colonial times in Angola and Mozambique. Based on this, he and his wife, the self-trained ethnologist Margot Dias, published three ethnographic volumes titled Os Macondes de Moçambique about the Makonde people of northern Mozambique. Further, Dias was the first director of the Museu de Etnología do Ultramar that later became the Museu Nacional de Etnología in Lisbon.

Notwithstanding his general acceptance of assimilationist concepts of Portuguese colonial rule and having authored classified reports about attitudes towards this rule in the later colonial era of Mozambique, Dias has been called "the most important Portuguese anthropologist of the 20th century."

== Life and career ==
=== Early life ===
Dias was born in Porto in 1907 and spent most of his youth there. His parents had a farm near Guimarães, where Dias grew up experiencing Portuguese rural life. After finishing his schooling, he moved to the village of Gralheira, near Cinfães. As a travelling salesman, he roamed around the regions of Minho and Trás-os-Montes, selling umbrellas and even accompanying a travelling circus. At the age of twenty-two, he prepared for the entrance exams in order to study Germanic Philology at the University of Coimbra. During the following years, he had three children with his first wife, Madalena Lima de Almeida Dias.

Before and during World War II, Dias was seconded by the Portuguese Ministry of Education to Germany as lecturer in Portuguese. He taught at the University of Rostock from 1938 to 1939, the Ludwig-Maximilians-Universität München from 1939 to 1942, and the Friedrich Wilhelm University of Berlin from 1942 to 1944. At the Ludwig-Maximilians-Universität München, he started his interest in Regional Ethnology (in German: Volkskunde), a discipline still unknown in Portugal at the time. In 1940, he met the German pianist Margot Schmidt at a concert in Rostock. They married in November 1941 and had three children in the following years. Dias studied contemporary history and German studies for six semesters at the Faculty of Philosophy at the Ludwig-Maximilians-Universität München, majoring in Romance philology; his professors were Romanist Hans Rheinfelder, Germanists Otto Höfler and Herbert Cysarz, and historian Karl Alexander von Müller. In March 1944, he obtained his doctorate from the Ludwig-Maximilians-Universität München with a thesis in European ethnology based on his research on the Portuguese town Vilarinho da Furna, carried out under the supervision of Gerhard Rohlfs but apparently defended under Otto Höfler.

=== Academic career ===
Dias returned to Portugal in March 1944 and was invited by António Mendes Corrêa to head the ethnography section of the Centre for Peninsular Ethnology Studies (CEEP), founded in 1945 at the University of Porto. Dias directed this department from 1947 until 1959 and became director of the CEEP from 1960 onwards. His research team included Margot Dias, Fernando Galhano, Ernesto Veiga de Oliveira and Benjamim Enes Pereira as collaborators. Dias also became a member of the International Commission for Ethnology and Folklore (SIEF), of which he was general secretary from 1954 to 1957.

From 1952 to 1956, Dias was Professor of Ethnology at the University of Coimbra, after which he moved on to the University of Lisbon. As professor of Cultural Anthropology, he taught General and Regional Ethnology, including courses about so-called "Native Institutions" at the Institute of Overseas Studies. In 1954, he was visiting professor at the Centre for Portuguese Studies teaching a course on Portuguese Ethnography at the Paraná State University in Curitiba, Brazil. Further, he spoke about Portuguese Culture in Africa as a guest lecturer at the University of the Witwatersrand, Johannesburg, South Africa, in 1959.

=== Angola, Mozambique and Portuguese Guinea ===
In 1957, Dias received a commission from the Portuguese government to investigate indigenous people of Portuguese colonies in Africa: the Mission for the Study of Ethnic Minorities in Portuguese Overseas Territories (MEMEUP), whose purpose was to study the ethnic minorities of Portuguese overseas territories and their attitude towards Portuguese colonial rule. On this mission he, Margot Dias and Manuel Viegas Guerreiro travelled to Angola, Mozambique and Portuguese Guinea. Between 1957 and 1961 they carried out research campaigns on the Makonde people of northern Mozambique, the Chopi of southern Mozambique and the San people of Angola. In 1961, Margot Dias returned to Mozambique on her own and for the last time. Due to the political instability in the region following the Mueda massacre, the mission made no further visits. Ultimately, these campaigns resulted in the publication of four monographic volumes titled Os Macondes de Moçambique.

=== Classified reports about the campaigns ===
At the same time when Dias's mission undertook their ethnographic fieldwork that resulted in the monographs on the Makonde and their region, the mission also produced classified reports on the ethnic minorities in the Portuguese colonies. These were delivered to the director of the Centre for Political and Social Studies of the Overseas Research Board and to the Overseas Ministry at the end of each campaign. This was part of a political strategy of "scientific coverage" of the colonies, promoted by the authoritarian regime known as Estado Novo. Especially in Mozambique, ethnological research was promoted due to the colony's proximity to Tanzania, where numerous Makonde people live just across the border and the political developments in other neighbouring countries. These classified documents describe the political and social situation surrounding the mission's research and have been found important to better understand the context in which the monographs on the Makonde and northern Mozambique were produced. Among other observations, Dias had denounced the racism of the Portuguese settlers in these confidential reports.

=== Later life ===
In 1962, Dias started the Centre for Cultural Anthropology Studies, which he then directed. This centre was dedicated to ethnographic research in the overseas territories. On the basis of data collected by this centre, as well as by the Missão de Estudos das Minorias Étnicas do Ultramar Português (MEMEUP), the Museu de Etnologia do Ultramar (Overseas Ethnology Museum) was founded in 1965. He set up and directed this new museum until the time of his death in 1973. The museum included collections from mainland Portugal and the archipelagos of the Azores and Madeira, as well as from Africa, South America and Asia. Considerably enlarged, it became the present-day Museu Nacional de Etnología in Lisbon. Among other scholars, the museum's website gives credit to Jorge and Margot Dias as pioneers of ethnology in Portugal.

Towards the end of his life, Dias became pessimistic about the endangered relationship of nature and human demographic growth:

We must think seriously and quickly about the future, before it becomes the present, in order to preserve all the human values that make life worth living. [...] The beauty and the sense of human dignity that natural space gives us, where man can move freely, are goods that are seriously threatened by this dizzying demographic growth. I don't know if it is possible to live on algae or cells - but it will certainly be tragic to live like an anthill, without horizons and without dreams...

— Jorge Dias, Estudos de Antropologia

Jorge Dias died in 1973 at age 65 and was survived by his wife Margot Dias, who died in 2001 at the age of 93. Karin Schmidt Dias, one of their daughters, was married to the later President of Portugal, Jorge Sampaio, in his first marriage.

== Selected publications ==
Dias authored numerous articles and books of ethnology and cultural anthropology. His most important works and a milestone in the history of Portuguese social anthropology are the volumes about the Makonde people of Mozambique, volume II and III co-authored and with photographs by Margot Dias. The fourth volume on cultural knowledge, language, literature and games of the Makonde was written by their collaborator Manuel Viegas Guerreiro.

Os Macondes de Moçambique (4 vol.)

- Volume I – Aspectos históricos e económicos (1964)
- Volume II – Cultura material (with Margot Dias – 1964)
- Volume III – Vida social e ritual (with Margot Dias – 1970)
- Volume IV – Sabedoria, lingua, literatura e jogos, (by M. Viegas Guerreiro, 1966)

A new edition of the first volume was published in 1998 with an introduction by Rui Pereira.

== Recognition and awards ==
Dias was posthumously decorated as Commander of the Military Order of Saint James of the Sword (4 July 1973) and with the Grand Cross of the Order of Prince Henry the Navigator (3 July 1987).

== Reception ==
According to studies by Portuguese scholars such as Rui Pereira and Joana Cunha Leal, the team of ethnologists created by Jorge Dias as part of the Centre for Peninsular Ethnology Studies (CEEP) carried out rigorous and systematic surveys and ethnographic investigation, which Dias set apart from general Anthropology, as he understood the latter as Physical Anthropology and the former as Cultural Anthropology or Ethnology. From an early stage, Jorge Dias' work was influenced by German-born US-American anthropologist Franz Boas. This was especially credited to Dias's understanding that an individual's behaviour is largely dictated by the social and cultural environment and not by biological factors such as racial traits. During the time when Dias was director of the ethnology section at CEEP, there was a renewal of ethnological studies in Portugal in which relations were established with similar international organizations. In 2015, the ethnologist Bjarne Rogan remarked Dias's "visions for the discipline and charisma, to which should be added his fluency in the main European languages." Dias became internationally known for his wide scope of scholarship and has been called "the most important Portuguese anthropologist of the 20th century."

In his obituary, Swiss ethnologist Arnold Niederer acknowledged the comprehensive approach of Dias's work, referring both to the studies about Portuguese regional communities as well as to Dias's work on the Makonde people: "The geographical background is omnipresent, the description, however, is ethnographic and takes into consideration the historical factors."

The volumes written by Jorge and Margot Dias on the Makonde of Mozambique were described in some reviews in the 1960s as excellent works of social anthropological literature, but social anthropologist Susan Drucker criticised their "uncritical use of sources, ethnocentric prejudice, conjecture and literary style." In his introduction to the new edition of the first volume published in 1998, the Portuguese politician Rui Pereira commented on the colonial context of the mission: "In the course of the campaigns, Jorge Dias [seems] to have reversed the hierarchy of interests previously established by the sponsors of his research in northern Mozambique, i.e. he placed the eminently ethnological objectives in the foreground."

The fact that Dias had both authored his ethnological reports as well as unpublished classified reports about political developments in Mozambique was later criticised by historians who accused Dias's mission of collaboration with the political regime of the time and a general acceptance of the assimilationist concept of Lusotropicalism. On the other hand, as these classified documents describe the political and social situation surrounding the mission's research, they have been found important to better understand the context in which Dias's monographs on the Makonde and northern Mozambique were produced.

In her 2021 study "Evidence and Fiction: An Untimely Alliance with the Photography Archive of Margot Dias and Jorge Dias", the artist Catarina Simão used photographs by Jorge and Margot Dias, among others, as a photographic medium to investigate concepts such as "authenticity" and "coloniality" as documents of Visual anthropology.

== Sources ==
- Leal, João (2023), "Abreise aus Berlin: os últimos meses de Jorge Dias na Alemanha (1943-1944)", Etnográfica, 27 (2): 495–525
