= Microbiologist =

Person who investigates the characteristics of microscopic organisms

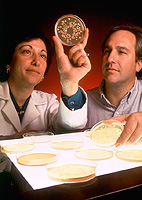
- Microbiologists examining cultures on a Petri dish

Occupation
- Activity sectors: Biotechnology, Government, Research, Environmental, Academia

Description
- Related jobs: Scientist, Educator

A microbiologist (from Greek μῑκρος) is a scientist who studies microscopic life forms and processes. This includes study of the growth, interactions and characteristics of microscopic organisms such as bacteria, algae, fungi, and some types of parasites and their vectors. Most microbiologists work in offices and/or research facilities, both in private biotechnology companies and in academia. Most microbiologists specialize in a given topic within microbiology such as bacteriology, parasitology, virology, or immunology.

== Duties ==
Microbiologists generally work in some way to increase scientific knowledge or to utilise that knowledge in a way that improves outcomes in medicine or some industry. For many microbiologists, this work includes planning and conducting experimental research projects in some kind of laboratory setting. Others may have a more administrative role, supervising scientists and evaluating their results. Microbiologists working in the medical field, such as clinical microbiologists, may see patients or patient samples and do various tests to detect disease-causing organisms.

For microbiologists working in academia, duties include performing research in an academic laboratory, writing grant proposals to fund research, as well as some amount of teaching and designing courses. Microbiologists in industry roles may have similar duties except research is performed in industrial labs in order to develop or improve commercial products and processes. Industry jobs may also not include some degree of sales and marketing work, as well as regulatory compliance duties. Microbiologists working in government may have a variety of duties, including laboratory research, writing and advising, developing and reviewing regulatory processes, and overseeing grants offered to outside institutions. Some microbiologists work in the field of patent law, either with national patent offices or private law practices. Their duties include research and navigation of intellectual property regulations. Clinical microbiologists tend to work in government or hospital laboratories where their duties include analyzing clinical specimens to detect microorganisms responsible for the disease. Some microbiologists instead work in the field of science outreach, where they develop programs and materials to educate students and non-scientists and encourage interest in the field of microbiology for the younger generations .

== Education ==
Entry-level microbiology jobs generally require at least a bachelor's degree in microbiology or a related field. These degree programs frequently include courses in chemistry, physics, statistics, biochemistry, and genetics, followed by more specialized courses in sub-fields of interest. Many of these courses have laboratory components to teach trainees basic and specialized laboratory skills.

Higher-level and independent jobs like a clinical/Medical Microbiologist in a hospital or medical research centre generally require a Masters in Microbiology along with PhD in any of the life-sciences (Biochem, Micro, Biotech, Genetics, etc) as well as several years experience as a microbiologist. This often includes time spent as a postdoctoral researcher wherein one leads research projects and prepares to transition to an independent career. Postdoctoral researchers are often evaluated largely based on their record of published academic papers, as well as recommendations from their supervisors and colleagues.

In certain sub-fields of microbiology, licenses or certifications are available or required in order to qualify for certain positions. This is true for clinical microbiologists, as well as those involved in food safety and some aspects of pharmaceutical/medical device development.

== Job outlook ==
Microbiologists are expected to be needed to help pharmaceutical and biotechnology companies develop new drugs that are produced with the aid of microorganisms. In addition, demand for biofuels production is expected to increase the need for microbiologists to conduct advanced research and development in these areas.

In the United States, the Bureau of Labor Statistics predicts that employment of microbiologists will grow 5 percent from 2022 (20,900 employed) to 2032 (22,000 employed). This represents slower growth than the average occupation, as well as slower growth than life scientists as a whole (7 percent projected).

== See also ==
- Bacteriologist
- List of microbiologists
