= National Museum of Ethnology (Portugal) =

Museum in Lisbon, Portugal

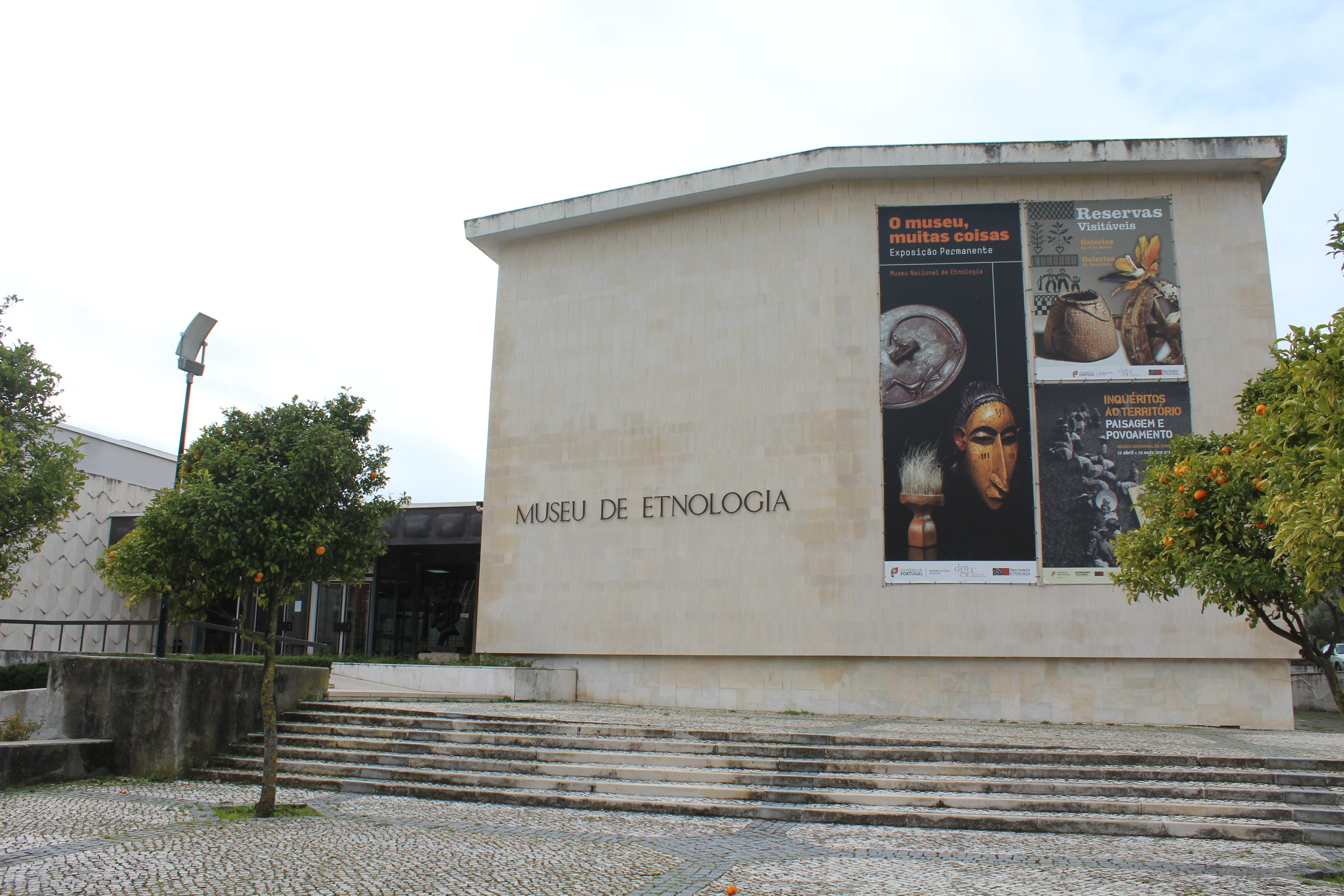
- Former name: Museu de Etnologia do Ultramar (Overseas Ethnology Museum)
- Established: 1976
- Location: Restelo, Lisbon, Portugal
- Type: Ethnographic Museum
- Visitors: 5,217 (2022)
- Website: https://museudeetnologia.pt

The National Museum of Ethnology (Portuguese: Museu Nacional de Etnologia) is an ethnographic museum in Lisbon, Portugal. The museum holds the most important ethnographic collections in the country. It is responsible for research, safeguarding and management of more than 40.000 objects from Africa, Asia and South America, as well as of a separate collection of Portuguese folk art and other forms of the country's ethnographic heritage.

== Description ==
The museum's ethnographic collections are divided into two separate departments. There is the collection assembled for the earlier Museu de Etnologia do Ultramar (Overseas Ethnology Museum), started in 1965 by Jorge Dias and his team, who introduced the field of social anthropology to Portugal. These collections, totaling about 42,000 objects, represent 80 countries and 5 continents, with greater emphasis on cultures from Africa, Asia and South America as well as on traditional Portuguese culture. Many of these collections were documented through field research. Further, the museum holds important archives of photographs, films, recording and other media.

The second department of the museum consists of 11,600 objects from the Popular Art Museum. This collection was largely assembled in the 1930s and early 1940s for exhibitions promoted by the military dictatorship (1926-1933) and the regime of the Estado Novo (1933-1974). This department presents Portuguese folk art and traditions.

The present museum's building was opened in 1976 and extended in 2000. Following the transfer of the collections of the former Museum of Popular Art to the building of the National Museum of Ethnology, both museums were merged into a single museum and became the National Museum of Ethnology / Popular Art Museum. For this, the new Galleries of Rural Life were added, and in 2006, the Amazonia Galleries were inaugurated.

=== Permanent exhibition ===
In 2025, the permanent exhibition, titled The Museum, many Things, features objects and their cultural background from Portugal, Indonesia, Angola and Mali. These include the Balinese shadow theatre Wayang Kulit, puppet figurines from south-western Angola, puppets and masks from Mali, sculptures and musical instruments from different folk music traditions in Portugal.

With this series of objects and elements of the museum's history, the exhibition commemorates some of the ethnologists who contributed to the collections and early stages of the museum. These include Jorge Dias, Margot Dias, Fernando Galhano, Ernesto Veiga de Oliveira and Benjamim Pereira, who were part of a group of researchers in the Centre for Ethnological Studies from the late 1940s onwards.

=== Temporary exhibitions ===
Among its temporary shows, the museum has been presenting the exhibition "Deconstructing Colonialism, Decolonising the Imaginary" focusing on Portuguese colonialism in Africa from 30 October 2024 to 2 November 2025. This is part of the museum’s aims to investigate "the provenance of its extra-European collections and to reflect on the colonial context in which the museum was founded and its first collections were gathered."

In 2000, the National Museum of Ethnology cooperated with the Museum of Modern Art in New York City for a travelling exhibition showing African art from its collection.

== Gallery ==
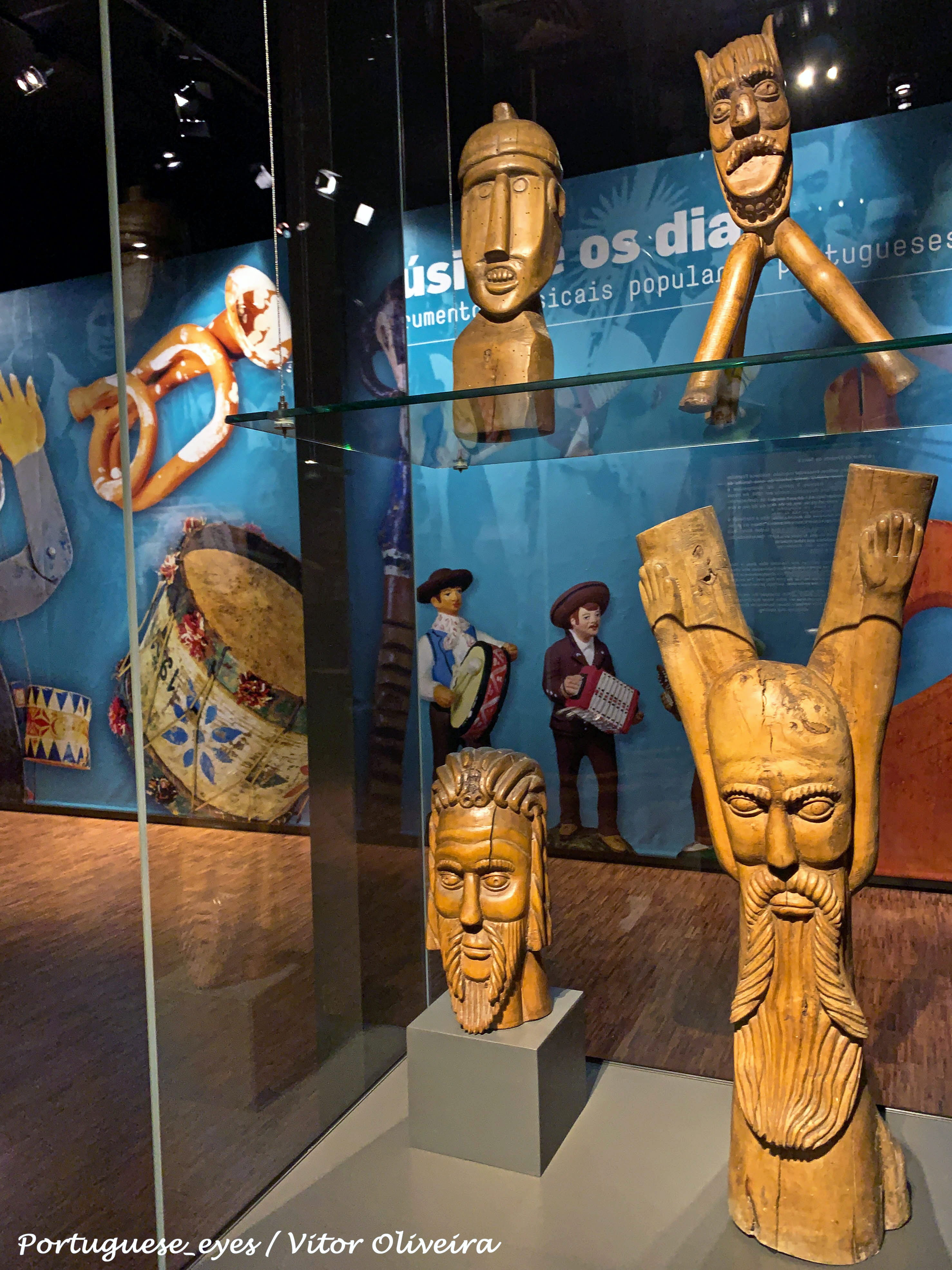
Wooden sculptures of Portuguese folk art

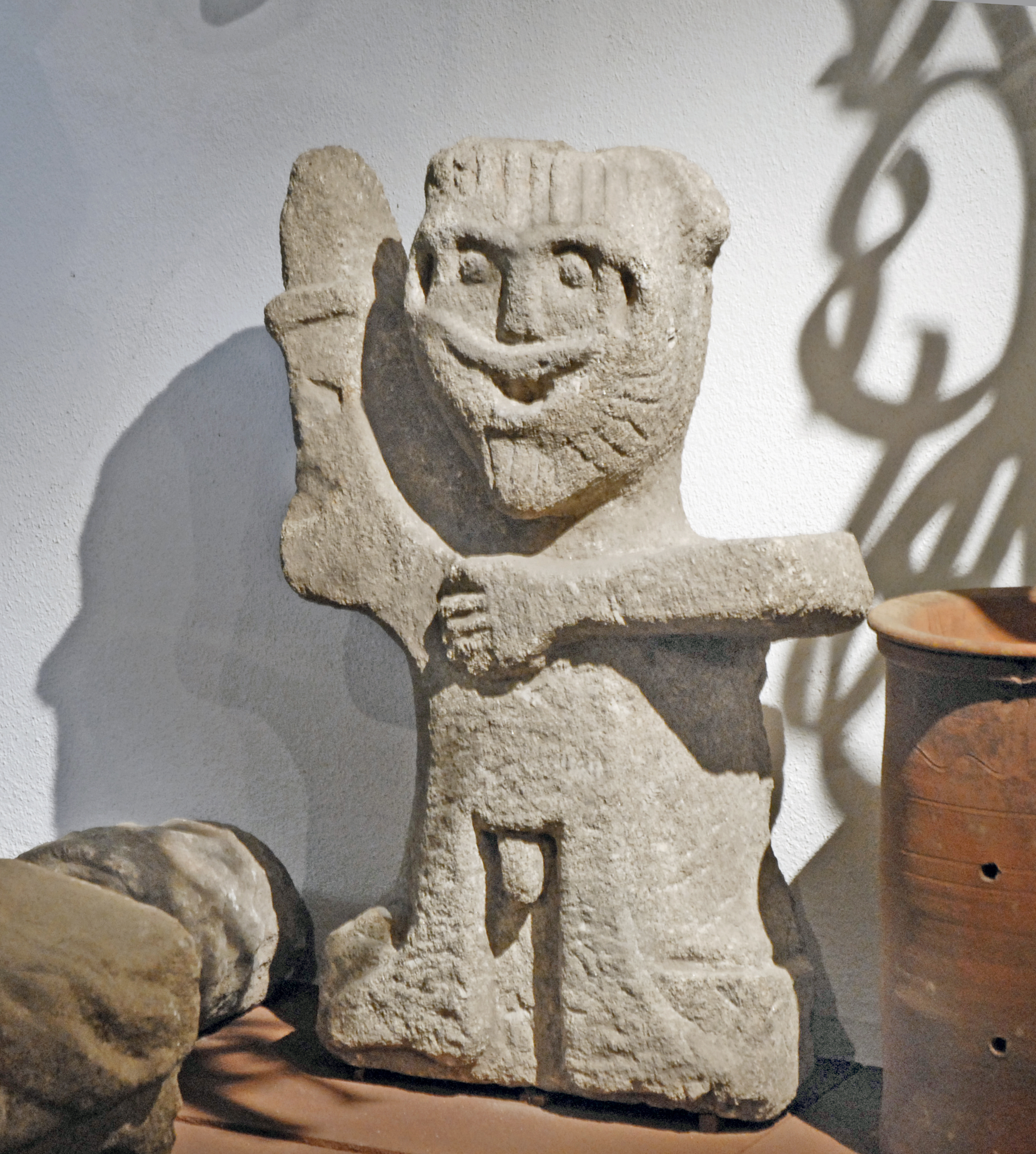
Stone sculpture of Portuguese folk art

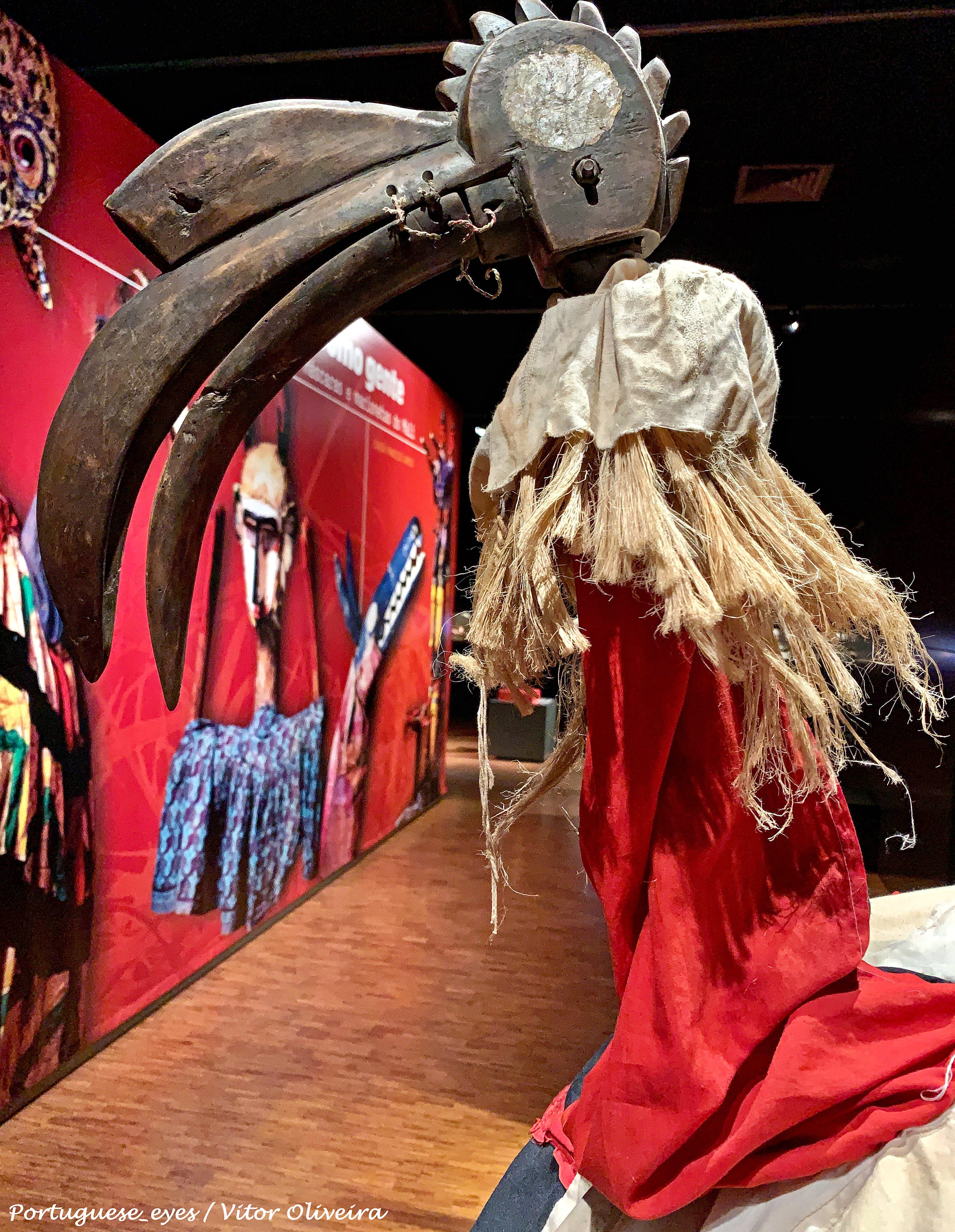
African dancer's mask and costume

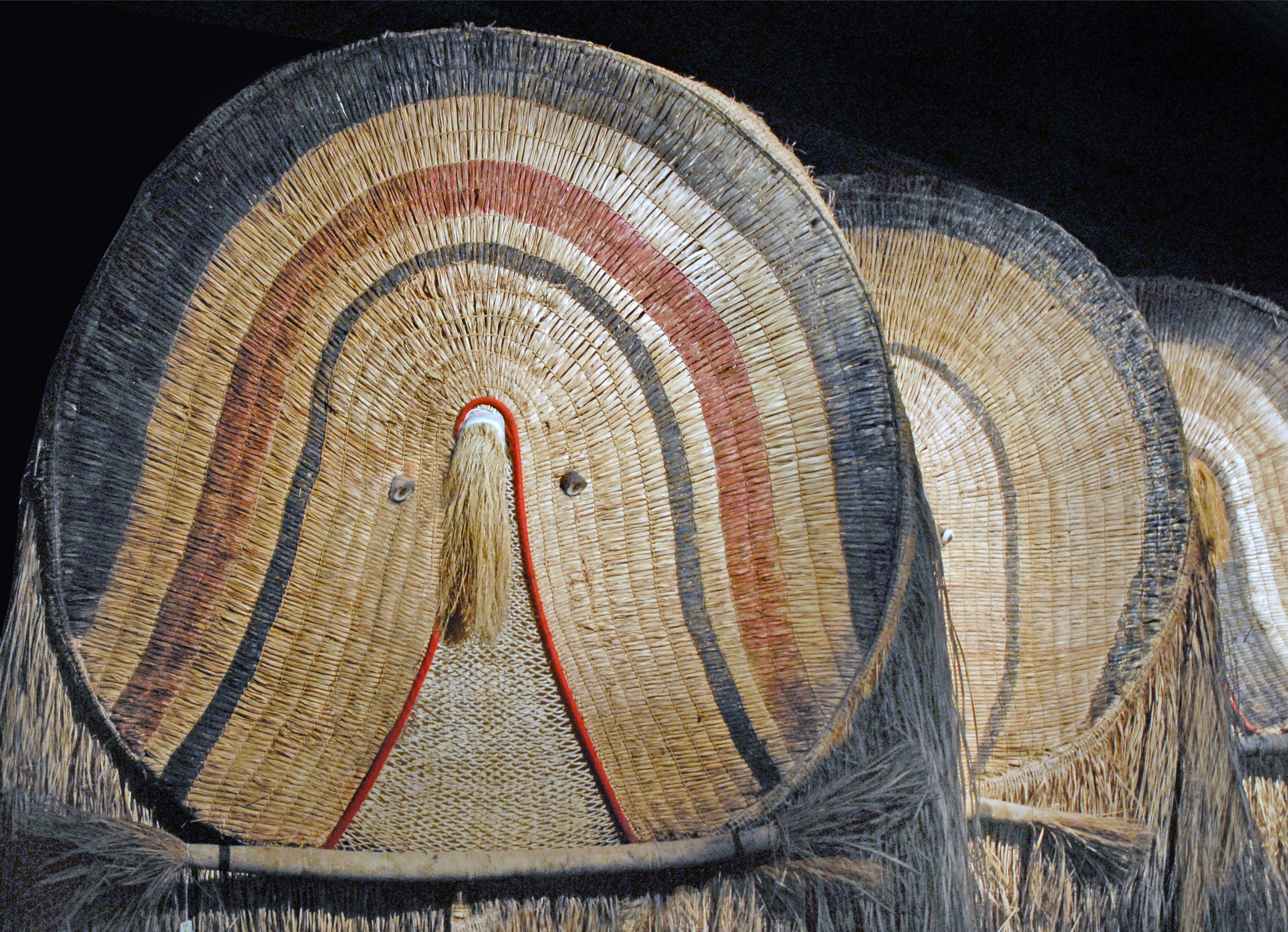
Masks from Mato Grosso, Brazil

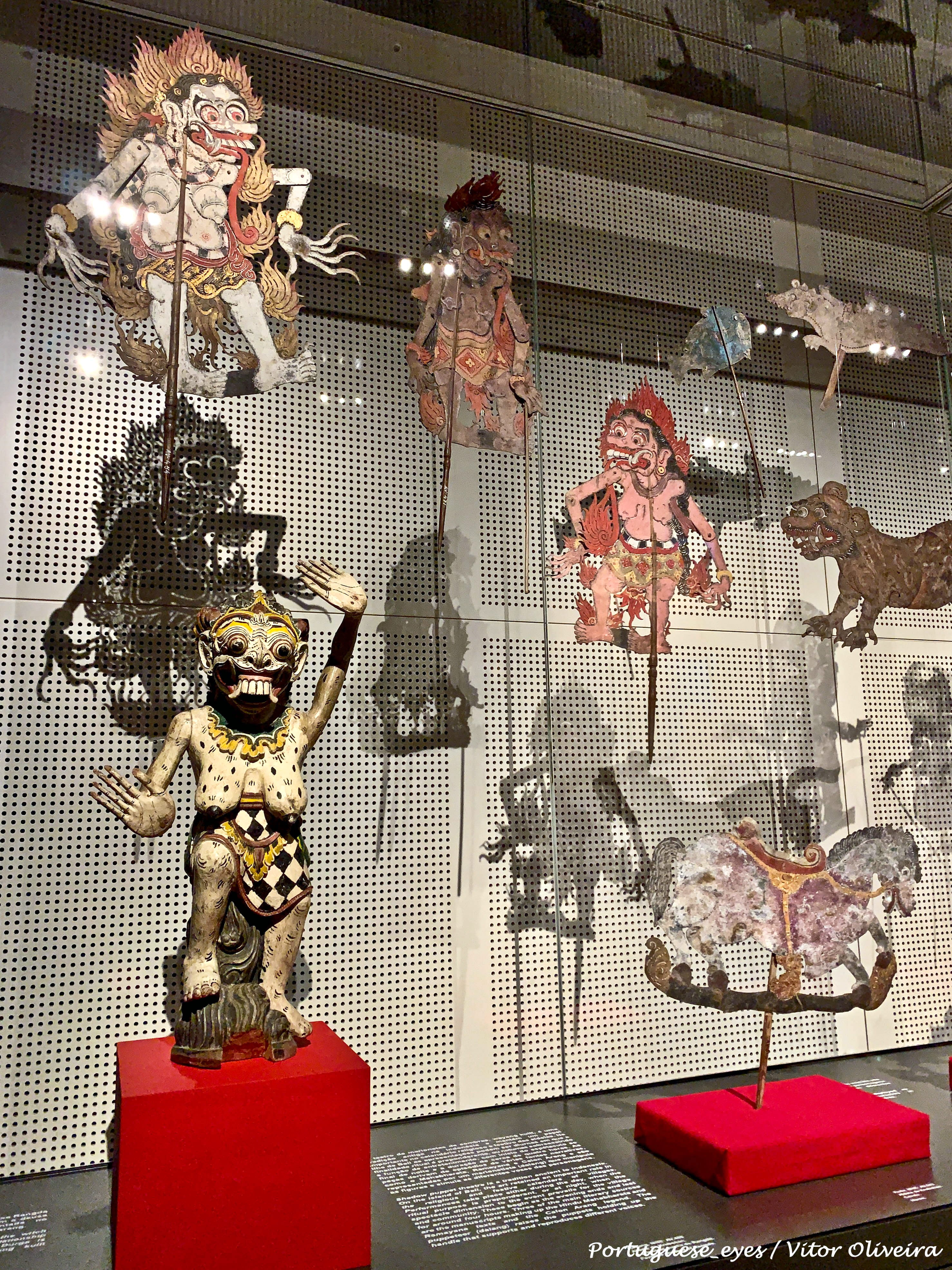
Puppets from Balinese shadow theatre
