= Pauline Johnson (immunologist) =

English immunologist and microbiologist

- Born: Yorkshire, England
- Education: Liverpool University; University of Dundee; Oxford University; Salk Institute
- Known for: Work on lymphocyte cell surface molecules and hyaluronan
- Scientific career
- Fields: Immunology
- Institutions: University of British Columbia

Pauline Johnson is an English immunologist and microbiologist at the University of British Columbia. Her research focuses on innate and adaptive immune mechanisms — in particular, the mobility of proteins in membranes, lymphocyte cell surface molecules, T cell signalling, leukocyte adhesion, and macrophages in lung inflammation.

== Education ==
Pauline Johnson was born in Yorkshire, England. She earned a BSc in biochemistry from Liverpool University in 1980, and a Ph.D from the University of Dundee in 1983. Her Ph.D. project was to determine the lateral and rotational mobility of membrane components measured by fluorescence recovery after photobleaching and fluorescence depletion recovery.

She was a post-doctoral fellow at the Salk Institute in California, US under the supervision of Ian Trowbridge and at the MRC Cellular Immunology Unit at the University of Oxford, U.K. under the supervision of Alan F. Williams before joining the faculty at the University of British Columbia in 1991.

== Career and research ==
Johnson helped to establish the function of CD45 as a critical protein tyrosine phosphatase in T cell activation and defined the mechanisms regulating the interactions of the cell adhesion molecule CD44 with the matrix component, hyaluronan.

Her research in 2020 uses mouse models of lung disease to study the function of macrophages and the cell matrix in infection, inflammation, and cancer.

She held an MRC Scientist Award and was Co-Director of the Infection, Inflammation and Immunity Research Group at the Life Science Institute at UBC (2003-2009). She has served multiple times on the CIHR Immunology and Transplantation panel, including as Scientific Officer, as well as on other national and international review panels. She is a member of the CIHR III Institute Advisory Board (III institute = Inflammation, infection and immunity CIHR Institute).

== Awards ==
- MRC Scientist Award, MRC of Canada, 1999-2004
- Women in Science Award for Community Leadership and Scientific Excellence, Minerva Foundation for B.C. Women, 2013

== Publications ==
- Johnson, P. & Garland, P. B. (1981). "Depolarisation of fluorescence depletion. A microscopic method for measuring rotational diffusion of membrane proteins on the surface of a single cell". FEBS Lett. 132 (2): 252–256. Bibcode:1981FEBSL.132..252J. doi:10.1016/0014-5793(81)81172-6. PMID 6170530.
- Johnson, P. & Williams, A. F. (1986). "Striking similarities between antigen receptor J pieces and sequence in the second chain of the murine CD8 antigen". Nature. 323 (6083): 74–76. Bibcode:1986Natur.323...74J. doi:10.1038/323074a0. PMID 3092111. S2CID 4305448.
- Johnson, P., Ostergaard, H. L., Wasden, C. & Trowbridge, I. S. (1992). "Mutational analysis of CD45, a leukocyte specific tyrosine phosphatase". Journal of Biological Chemistry. 267 (12): 8035–8041. doi:10.1016/S0021-9258(18)42404-0. PMID 1314815.
- Maiti, A., Maki, G. & Johnson P. (1998). "TNF-α induction of CD44-mediated leukocyte adhesion by sulfation". Science. 282 (5390): 941–943. Bibcode:1998Sci...282..941M. doi:10.1126/science.282.5390.941. PMID 9794764.
- Ruffell, B., Poon, G.F.T., Lee, S.S.M., Brown, K.L., Tjew, S-L., Cooper. J., & Johnson, P. (2011). "Differential use of chondroitin sulfate to regulate hyaluronan binding by CD44 in inflammatory and alternatively activated macrophages". Journal of Biological Chemistry. 286 (22): 19179–19190. doi:10.1074/jbc.M110.200790. PMC 3103297. PMID 21471214.
- Lee-Sayer, S.M., Dong, Y., Arif, A.A., Olsson, M., Brown, K.L, & Johnson, P. (2015). "The where, when, how, and why of hyaluronan binding by immune cells". Frontiers in Immunology. 6: 150. doi:10.3389/fimmu.2015.00150. PMC 4396519. PMID 25926830.
- Samarakoon, A., SHIM, Y. A., Dosanjh, M, Crickmer, M., Labontè-Raymond, C., Arif, A.A. & Johnson, P. (2016). "CD45 regulates GM-CSF, retinoic acid and T cell homing in intestinal inflammation". Mucosal Immunology. 9 (6): 1514–1527. doi:10.1038/mi.2016.23. PMID 27007678.
- Johnson, P., Arif, AA, Lee-Sayer, S.S.M., Dong, Y. (2018). "Hyaluronan and Its Interactions With Immune Cells in the Healthy and Inflamed Lung". Frontiers in Immunology. 9 2787. doi:10.3389/fimmu.2018.02787. PMC 6281886. PMID 30555472.
- Dong, Y., Arif, AA., Guo, J., HA, Z., Lee-Sayer, SSM., Poon, GFT., Dosanjh, M., Roskelley, C., Huan, T., Johnson, P. (2020). "CD44 loss disrupts lung lipid surfactant homeostasis and exacerbates oxidized lipid-induced lung inflammation". Frontiers in Immunology. 11 29. doi:10.3389/fimmu.2020.00029. PMC 7002364. PMID 32082314.
