= Dias (surname) =

Dias is a common patronymic surname in the Portuguese language, and therefore in Portugal and Brazil, as well as in the former Portuguese colony Goa. It is cognate to the Spanish language surname Díaz.

Notable people with the surname include:

== A ==
- Adriana Dias (1970–2023), Brazilian anthropologist
- Afonso Dias (born 1949), Portuguese singer, musician, poet, and actor
- Albertina Dias (born 1965), Portuguese long-distance runner
- Alberto Romão Dias (1941–2007), Portuguese scientist
- Aleixo das Neves Dias (born 1944), Indian Catholic priest, bishop of Port Blair
- Alércio Dias (1942–2020), Brazilian politician (died 2020)
- Alex Dias (born 1972), Brazilian footballer
- Aline Dias (born 1991), Brazilian actress and model
- Allan Dias (Brazilian footballer) (born 1988), Brazilian footballer
- Allan Dias (Indian footballer) (born 1986), Indian footballer
- Alvaro Dias (born 1944), Brazilian politician
- Álvaro Dias (athlete) (1923–2005), Portuguese long jumper
- Álvaro Costa Dias (born 1959), Brazilian doctor and politician
- Alycia Dias (born 1992), Pakistani playback singer
- Ana Dias (runner) (born 1974), Portuguese long-distance runner
- Ana Dias (footballer) (born 1997), Portuguese footballer
- Ana Dias (photographer) (born 1984), Portuguese photographer
- André Dias (born 1979), Brazilian footballer
- André Dias (footballer, born 1981), Brazilian footballer
- André Dias (footballer, born 1992), Portuguese footballer
- André Dias (footballer, born 1990) (born 1990), Brazilian footballer
- André Dias (footballer, born 2001), Portuguese footballer
- Andrew Dias (born 1998), Canadian soccer player
- Annesley Dias (1927–2009), Sri Lankan actor and comedian
- Anthony J. Dias, American materials scientist
- Anthony Lancelot Dias (1910–2002), Indian politician and ICS officer
- Antônio de Jesus Dias (1942–2020), Brazilian politician
- Antonio Dias (footballer) (1893–2000), Brazilian footballer
- Antonio Dias (artist) (1944–2018), Brazilian artist and painter
- Antônio Soares Dias (1945–2022), Brazilian lawyer and politician
- Aristides Dias (1928–1991), Indian playwright and singer
- Arthur Dias (born 2007), Brazilian footballer
- Arthur V. Dias (1886–1960), Sri Lankan activist
- Artur Soares Dias (born 1979), Portuguese football referee
- Ashan Dias (born 1981), Sri Lankan actor and presenter
- Austin Dias (born 1998), NZ rugby league footballer
- Avani Dias (born 1991), Australian journalist and radio presenter

== B ==
- Barthélémy Dias (born 1975), Senegalese politician
- Bartolomeu Dias (c. 1450–1500), Portuguese maritime explorer
- Beatriz Gomes Dias (born 1971), Portuguese politician of Bissau-Guinean origin
- Bernardo Dias (born 1997), Portuguese footballer
- Bonifacio Dias (born 1947), Indian filmmaker and playwright
- Braulio Ferreira de Souza Dias (born 1953), Brazilian diplomat and politician
- Bruno Dias (born 1976), Portuguese politician

== C ==
- C. S. Dias (born 1969), Indian judge of Kerala High Court
- Camille Dias (born 1996), Swiss-Portuguese alpine skier
- Cândido Lima da Silva Dias (1913–1998), Brazilian mathematician
- Carlos Alberto Dias (1967–2026), Brazilian football player and manager
- Carlos Dias (footballer) (born 2000), Brazilian footballer
- Carlos Dias (fencer) (1910–1995), Portuguese fencer
- Celestina Dias (1858–1933), Ceylonese philanthropist and businesswoman
- Célio Alves Dias (born 1971), Macanese racing driver
- Célio Dias (born 1993), Portuguese judoka
- Cello Dias, Brazilian bassist
- Charles Dias, Indian politician
- Clafasio Dias, Indian politician
- Clara Dias (1946–2021), Indian actress and singer
- Claudio Dias (born 1994), English footballer
- Clifton Dias (born 1991), Indian footballer
- Correia Dias (born 1919), Portuguese footballer
- Craig Dias, Irish Gaelic footballer
- Cristiano Dias (born 1986), Brazilian footballer
- Cyriaco Dias (born 1937), Indian actor and singer

== D ==
- Daiene Dias (born 1989), Brazilian swimmer
- Daniel Dias (born 1988), Brazilian Paralympic swimmer
- Danilo Dias (born 1985), Brazilian footballer
- Danny Dias (1983–2017), American activist
- David Dias (born 1969), Angolan basketball player
- Davide Dias (born 1983), Portuguese footballer
- Denny Dias (born 1946), American guitarist
- Deshan Dias (born 1992), Sri Lankan cricketer
- Dharmapriya Dias (born 1975), Sri Lankan actor and director
- Dinis Dias (15th-century), Portuguese explorer
- Dionísio Tomé Dias (born 1943), São Tomé and Príncipe politician
- Djalma Dias (1939–1990), Brazilian footballer
- Douglas Dias (born 1993), Brazilian footballer
- Duílio Dias (1935–1991), Brazilian footballer

== E ==
- Eduardo José dos Reis Dias, Soft redirect to Wikispecies
- Edwarda Dias (born 1999), Brazilian paralympic sitting volleyball player
- Emília Dias (born 1972), Angolan politician
- Emma-Rosa Dias, Irish television presenter
- Emmy Lopes Dias (1919–2005), Dutch actress and activist
- Eurico Brilhante Dias (born 1972), Portuguese politician
- Everardo Dias (1883–1966), Brazilian journalist
- Everton Dias (born 1990), Brazilian footballer

== F ==
- Fausto Bordalo Dias (1948–2024), Portuguese singer and composer
- Felipe Dias (born 1986), Brazilian footballer
- Fernando de Quintanilha e Mendonça Dias (1898-1992), Portuguese Navy admiral & colonial governor
- Fernando Dias, Bissau-Guinean politician and lawyer
- Fernão Dias (1608–1681), Paulista bandeirante
- Filipe Oliveira Dias (1963–2014), Portuguese architect
- Filomeno do Nascimento Vieira Dias (born 1958), Angolan prelate of the Catholic Church
- Flávio Dias (born 1978), Brazilian footballer
- Flavio Dos Santos Dias (born 1995), Cape Verdean footballer
- Frances Dias (1916–1994), American aviator
- Francis Dias (1934–2019), Indian Army general
- Francisco Coelho Maduro Dias (1904–1986), Portuguese artist
- Francisco de Oliveira Dias (1930–2019), Portuguese politician

== G ==
- Gabriel Dias (footballer) (born 1994), Brazilian footballer
- Gabriel Dias (racing driver) (born 1990), Brazilian racing driver
- Gabriela Mantellato Dias (born 1991), Brazilian water polo player
- Gaspar Dias (1600–1671), Portuguese painter
- Gayathri Dias, Sri Lankan actress and beautician
- Gil Dias (born 1996), Portuguese footballer
- Gizele Maria da Costa Dias (born 1977), Brazilian Paralympic sitting volleyball player
- Gonçalves Dias (1823–1864), Brazilian poet, playwright, ethnographer and linguist
- Guilherme Dias (born 1992), Brazilian taekwondo practitioner

== H ==
- Hacran Dias (born 1984), Brazilian martial artist
- Haroldo Dutra Dias (born 1971), Brazilian judge
- Hélder Vieira Dias (born 1953), Angolan general
- Hélio Dias (born 1943), Brazilian footballer
- Henrique Dias (footballer) (born 1984), Brazilian footballer
- Henrique Dias (died 1662), Brazilian soldier
- Hernâni Dias (born 1967), Portuguese politician
- Hertz Dias (born 1970), Brazilian politician and rapper

== I ==
- Iago Dias (born 1993), Brazilian footballer
- Ignatius Dias, Indian football midfielder
- Ivan Dias (1936–2017), Indian Catholic prelate
- Ivan Dias (futsal) (born 1972), Brazilian futsal player

== J ==
- Jacqueline Maria Dias (born 1965), Pakistani academic
- Jagath Dias (born 1960), Sri Lankan general
- Jean Dias (born 1990), Brazilian footballer
- Jennifer Dias (born 1985), Cape Verdean musical artist
- Jerry Dias (born 1958), Canadian trade unionist
- Jessie Dias (born 1946), Indian actress and singer
- Jill Rosemary Dias (1944–2008), Anglo-Portuguese anthropologist
- Joana Amaral Dias (born 1973), Portuguese politician and clinical psychologist
- João Dias (footballer) (born 1986), Portuguese footballer
- João Dias (politician) (born 1973), Portuguese politician
- João Scognamiglio Clá Dias (1939–2024), Brazilian priest and religious writer
- Jorge Dias
- Jose Antonio Dias, Angolan politician
- José Augusto Dias (born 1959), Olympic sailor from Brazil
- José Paulo Dias (born 1957), Olympic sailor from Brazil
- José Rodrigues Dias (1924–2007), Portuguese football manager
- José Simões Dias (1844–1899), Portuguese poet and writer
- Josephine Dias (born 1948), Indian Eucharistic minister and former actress
- Julia Dias (born 1959), British High Court judge

== K ==
- Kayo Dias (born 1990), Brazilian footballer
- Khiuani Dias (born 1992), Brazilian artistic gymnast

== L ==
- Laëtitia Romeiro Dias (born 1981), French politician
- Larissa Dias (born 1998), Brazilian jiu-jitsu competitor from Brazil
- Larry Dias, Set decorator
- Laryssa Dias (born 1983), Brazilian actress and dancer
- Lassana Dias (born 1979), Sri Lankan cricketer
- Laura Faver Dias, American politician in Illinois
- Leandro Dias (born 1985), Brazilian footballer
- Leo Dias (born 1975), Brazilian journalist
- Liceu Vieira Dias (1919–1994), Angolan musician and anti-colonial activist
- Luan Dias (born 1997), Brazilian footballer
- Lucas Dias (basketball) (born 1995), Brazilian basketball player
- Lucas Dias (soccer, born 2003), Canadian soccer player
- Lucas Dias (footballer, born 1999) (born 1999), French footballer
- Lucas Dias (footballer, born 1997), Brazilian footballer
- Luciano Dias (born 1970), Brazilian football coach and former player
- Lucky Dias (born 1951), Sri Lankan actor
- Luís Dias (footballer, born 1981), Portuguese footballer
- Luís Dias (footballer, born 1987), Portuguese footballer
- Luís Dias (politician) (born 1983), Portuguese politician
- Luisinho Dias (born 1973), Mozambican footballer

== M ==
- Manoel Dias (1938–2026), Brazilian politician
- Manuel Dias (athlete) (born 1905), Portuguese athlete
- Manuela Dias (born 1977), Brazilian actress and writer
- Marco Edson Gonçalves Dias (born 1950), Brazilian general and government minister
- Marcos Dias (born 2001), Brazilian footballer
- Marcus Vinícius Dias (1923–1991), Brazilian basketball player
- Margot Dias (1908–2001), German-Portuguese ethnologist
- Maria Berenice Dias (born 1948), Brazilian judge
- Maria de Fátima Silva de Sequeira Dias (1958–2013), Azorean historian, author, and academic (1958-2013)
- Maria Dias (footballer) (born 1995), Brazilian footballer
- Maria Helena da Costa Dias (1917–1994), Portuguese writer
- Maria Luísa Costa Dias (1916–1975), Portuguese communist and anti-government activist
- Mariano Dias (born 1960), Indian footballer and coach
- Mário Simões Dias (1903–1974), Portuguese musicologist and violinist
- Marley Dias, African-American activist and feminist
- Marta Dias, São Toméan Portuguese singer of jazz, world music and fado
- Martin Dias (born 1936), Guyanese weightlifter
- Matheus Dias (born 2002), Brazilian footballer
- Mayra Dias (born 1991), Brazilian model who is Miss Brasil 2018
- Megaton Dias (born 1967), Brazilian Jiu-Jitsu practitioner and instructor
- Michael Dias (1921–2009), British barrister and academic
- Miguel Caetano Dias (1854–1936), Portuguese Indian medical practitioner
- Miguel Dias (born 1968), Dutch boxer
- Mumadona Dias (died 968), Countess of Portugal

== N ==
- N. Q. Dias, Sri Lankan civil servant
- Nei Dias (born 1953), Brazilian footballer
- Neide Dias (born 1987), Angolan runner
- Nélia Dias (born 1959), Portuguese anthropologist and academic
- Ney Gonçalves Dias (born 1940), Brazilian journalist
- Niege Dias (born 1966), Brazilian tennis player
- Nílson Dias (born 1952), Brazilian footballer
- Nixon Dias (born 1979), Dutch footballer
- Nuno Dias (born 1972), Portuguese futsal coach
- Nuno Miguel Cerqueira Dias (1977–2014), Portuguese swimmer

== P ==
- Paulinho Dias (born 1988), Brazilian footballer
- Paulo Dias (footballer) (born 1944), Brazilian footballer
- Paulo Dias (chess player) (born 1979), Portuguese chess player
- Pavel Dias (1938–2021), Czech photographer
- Pawan Dias (born 1996), Sri Lankan cricketer
- Pedro Boscardin Dias (born 2003), Brazilian tennis player
- Pedro Dias (footballer, born 1973), Portuguese football manager and former player
- Pedro Dias (judoka) (born 1982), Portuguese judoka
- Pedro Dias (footballer, born 1992), Brazilian footballer
- Pero Dias (fl. 15th century), Portuguese explorer
- Placido Moreira Dias (born 1853), Brazilian military commander
- Platilda Dias (born 1949), Indian singer and comedian
- Prasad Dias (born 1977), Sri Lankan cricketer

== R ==
- Rafaël Dias (born 1991), Portuguese footballer
- Rafael Dias (footballer) (born 1983), Brazilian footballer
- Ralph E. Dias (1950–1969), Medal of Honor recipient
- Ranga Dias (cricketer) (born 1979), Sri Lankan cricketer
- Ranga P. Dias, Sri Lankan condensed matter physicist
- Ranil Dias (born 1957), Sri Lankan sailor
- Rejane Dias (born 1972), Brazilian politician
- Ricardo Dias (born 1991), Portuguese footballer
- Roberto Dias (footballer, born 1988), Brazilian footballer
- Roberto Dias (1943–2007), Brazilian footballer
- Rodrigo Dias (born 1994), Brazilian professional footballer
- Ron Dias (1937–2013), American animator and painter
- Roy Dias (born 1952), Sri Lankan cricketer
- Royston Dias (born 1993), Indian cricketer
- Rúben Dias (born 1997), Portuguese footballer

== S ==
- Sachin Dias (born 1996), Sri Lankan badminton player
- Sachith Dias (born 1984), Sri Lankan cricketer
- Sandro Dias (born 1975), Brazilian skateboarder
- Sandun Dias (born 1985), Sri Lankan cricketer
- Sarah-Jane Dias (born 1982), Indian actress
- Selma Vaz Dias (1911–1977), British actress, writer, and painter
- Sérgio Dias (born 1951), Brazilian musician
- Sônia Dias (born 1947), Brazilian actress
- Steven Dias (born 1983), Indian footballer
- Sudantha Dias (born 1971), Sri Lankan cricketer
- Sumangala Dias, Sri Lanka Air Force commander
- Suneera Sumanga Dias (born 1997), Sri Lankan singer and musician
- Susana de Sousa Dias (born 1962), Portuguese director
- Susana Dias (1553–1634), Paulista explorer
- Sylvester Dias (1937–2013), Sri Lankan cricketer

== T ==
- Teófilo Dias (1854–1889), Brazilian politician
- Tiago Dias (born 1998), Portuguese footballer
- Tony Dias, Bangladeshi television actor and director

== V ==
- Vernon Dias (1900–1963), Guyanese cricketer
- Virna Dias (born 1971), Brazilian volleyball player
- Vitor Dias (born 1998), Brazilian footballer

== W ==
- Waguinho Dias (born 1963), Brazilian footballer and coach
- Wellington Dias (politician) (born 1962), Brazilian politician
- Wellington Dias (footballer) (born 1977), Brazilian footballer
- Wictor Dias (born 2000), Brazilian footballer
- Willian Dias (born 1994), Brazilian footballer

== See also ==
- Dias (disambiguation)
- Dias (given name)
