= André Dias (disambiguation) =

André Dias (born 1979) is a Brazilian football centre-back

André Dias may also refer to:

- André Dias de Escobar (1348–1448), Portuguese Benedictine theologian
- André Dias (footballer, born 1981), Brazilian football striker
- André Dias (footballer, born 1990), Brazilian football goalkeeper
- André Dias (footballer, born 1992), Portuguese football left-back
- André Dias (footballer, born 2001), Portuguese football midfielder

== See also ==
- Andrew Dias (born 1998), Canadian soccer defender
