= Braulio =

Braulio is a masculine given name. Notable people with the name include:

== People ==
- Bráulio (footballer) (born 1948), Bráulio Barbosa de Lima, Brazilian football midfielder
- Braulio Alonso, Hispanic American teacher and principal
- Braulio Bahamonde, Chilean politician
- Braulio Estima, a Brazilian jiu-jitsu practitioner and mixed martial artist
- Braulio Ferreira de Souza Dias (born 1953), Brazilian diplomat and politician
- Braulio García, a Spanish singer-songwriter who is often credited as "Braulio"
- Braulio Guerra, a Mexican politician
- Braulio Lara, Dominican professional baseball pitcher
- Braulio Leal, Chilean football player and coach
- Braulio Luna, a Mexican football player
- Braulio Mari, a Spanish singer-songwriter
- Braulio Musso (1930–2025), a Chilean footballer
- Braulio Nóbrega, a Spanish football player
- Braulio Paredes, a Peruvian singer-songwriter who is often credited as "Braulio"
- Braulio of Zaragoza, a Bishop of Zaragoza, writer, cleric and Saint.

== Beverages ==
- Braulio, a liqueur from Valtellina, Italy

== Places ==
- Braulio E. Dujali, a municipality in the province of Davao del Norte, Philippines
