= José Dias =

José Dias may refer to

== People ==
- José Dias Coelho (1923–1961), Portuguese artist and sculptor
- José Dias de Melo (1925–2008), Portuguese author
- José Dias Ferreira (1837–1909), Prime Minister of Portugal, 1892–93
- José Simões Dias (1844–1899), Portuguese poet, short-story writer and literary critic
- Jose Antonio Dias, Angolan minister for geology and mines

== Places ==
- Coronel José Dias, Brazil

== Ships ==
- SS José Dias, a Soviet cargo ship in service 1946-66
