= Dias =

Dias or DIAS may refer to:

== Names ==
- Dias (given name), a list of people with the given name
- Dias (surname), a common surname in the Portuguese language, cognate to the Spanish surname Díaz
- Dias (Диас), a Soviet first name, which became widespread in honour to Spanish communist politician José Díaz
- Dias (Δίας), the Modern Greek name for god Zeus

== Organizations ==
- Detaşamentul de Poliţie pentru Intervenţie Rapidă (Special Actions and Interventions Detachment), a former name of Romanian police rapid response units
- Dublin Institute for Advanced Studies
- Dias (ΔΙ.ΑΣ), a police motorcycle unit of the Hellenic Police
- Copernicus Data and Information Access Services (DIAS), a European Commission initiative aimed at facilitating and standardizing access to satellite data

== Other uses ==
- Desmoteplase In Acute Stroke, a series of clinical trials investigating the clinical efficacy of desmoteplase, a thrombolytic agent, in treating acute ischaemic stroke
- Destruction in Art Symposium
- Dias (Lycia), a city of ancient Lycia
- Direct Internet Access System
- Viola (trawler), a steam trawler built in 1906 as the Viola and renamed Dias
- Reversal film, a type of photographic film that produces a positive image on a transparent base; diafilm, diapositives
- Dias (mythology), two figures in Greek mythology

== See also ==
- Dia (disambiguation), for the singalar of DIAs
- Diaz (disambiguation)
