= Diaz (disambiguation) =

Díaz is a surname of Spanish origin.

Diaz or Díaz may also refer to:

== People ==
- Diaz (musician) (born 1976), Norwegian rapper

== Places ==
- Diaz, Arkansas, a city in Jackson County, Arkansas, United States
- Prieto Diaz, a municipality in Sorsogon, Philippines
- Diaz, Tubajon, a barangay in the Philippines
- Armando Diaz, a school in Genoa, Italy, raided by police in 2001
- Diaz College, school in Tanjay City, Negros Oriental, Philippines

== Other uses ==
- Diaz – Don't Clean Up This Blood, a 2012 film by Daniele Vicari

== See also ==
- Dias (surname), the Portuguese equivalent of the surname Díaz
- Díaz-Balart family, a Cuban-American political family
- Dias (disambiguation)
