= Dias (given name) =

Dias is a given name. In Modern Greek, Dias (Δίας) is the primary name used for Zeus, the father and king of the gods in Greek mythology. It stems from the Proto-Indo-European root *dyeu-, which means "to shine," "sky," or "heaven". This is the same ancient linguistic root that gave rise to the Latin word deus (god) and the Spanish word dios. Notable people with the name include:

- Dias Alface, Mozambican long-distance runner
- Dias Caires (born 1978), Angolan footballer
- Dias Graça (born 1964), Brazilian footballer
- Dias Jirenbayev (born 2003), Kazakhstani figure skater
- Dias Kamelov (born 1981), Kazakhstani footballer
- Dias Keneshev (born 1985), Kazakhstani biathlete
- Dias Omirzakov (born 1992), Kazakhstani cyclist
- Dias Angga Putra (born 1989), Indonesian footballer

== See also ==
- Dias (disambiguation)
- Dias (surname)
