= Norbert Haymamba =

Cameroonian footballer

Personal information
- Full name: Norbert Alexandre Haymamba
- Date of birth: 30 March 1999 (age 27)
- Place of birth: Yaoundé, Cameroon
- Height: 2.05 m (6 ft 9 in)
- Position: Goalkeeper

Team information
- Current team: Vitória de Sernache

Youth career
- 2014–2018: Brasseries du Cameroun
- 2018–2019: Rio Ave

Senior career*
Years	Team	Apps	(Gls)
2019–2020	Oleiros	21	(0)
2020–2022	Arouca	3	(0)
2023	Cetatea Turnu Măgurele		
2023–2024	Gloria Buzău	1	(0)
2025–2026	Oliveira do Hospital	0	(0)
2026–	Vitória de Sernache	3	(0)
- * Club domestic league appearances and goals as of 13 September 2026

Norbert Alexandre Haymamba (born 30 March 1999) is a Cameroonian professional footballer who plays as a goalkeeper for Portuguese Liga 3 club Vitória de Sernache.

== Playing career ==
Haymamba is a youth product of the Cameroonian club Brasseries du Cameroun, and moved to the reserves of Rio Ave in 2018.

In 2019, he began his senior career with Oleiros in the Campeonato de Portugal before transferring to the Primeira Liga club Arouca on 21 August 2020. He made his professional debut with Arouca in a 2–1 Primeira Liga win over Boavista on 27 November 2021.
