= G.D. Vitória de Sernache =

Portuguese sports club

GD Vitória de Sernache
- Full name: Grupo Desportivo Vitória de Sernache
- Founded: 1948; 78 years ago
- Ground: Estádio Municipal D. Nuno Álvares Pereira, Cernache do Bonjardim
- Capacity: 2500
- Manager: Natan Costa
- League: Liga 3
- 2025–26: Campeonato de Portugal; Group stage, Serie C, 1st of 14; Promotion play-offs, Serie 2, 1st of 4 (promoted)

Grupo Desportivo Vitória de Sernache is the second largest sports club in the county of Sertã, Portugal.

The men's football team play on the Portuguese third tier in the 2026–27 Liga 3, staying in the Campeonato de Portugal from 2021 when this became the fourth tier.

== Current squad ==
As of 25 September 2026

Note: Flags indicate national team as defined under FIFA eligibility rules; some limited exceptions apply. Players may hold more than one non-FIFA nationality.

No.	Pos.	Nation	Player
1	GK	CMR	Norbert Haymamba
2	DF	POR	Paulinho
3	DF	POR	Diego Tavares
4	DF	BRA	Matheus Matias
5	DF	POR	Miguel Rosário
6	MF	POR	Roberto Embaló
7	FW	SUI	Alexandre Patrício
8	MF	POR	Mauro Santos
9	FW	BRA	Henrique Cavalcante
10	FW	POR	André Dias
11	DF	COL	Juan Muriel
12	GK	POR	Lucas Fachadas
13	MF	POR	Hircane Graça
14	MF	BRA	Bruno Henrique

No.	Pos.	Nation	Player
15	FW	BRA	Lucas Daniel
16	GK	BRA	João Lucas
17	DF	POR	Tomás Marques
18	MF	POR	Dudu
19	MF	POR	Edgar Moura
20	FW	POR	Gustavo Barge
—	GK	POR	Lucas Fernandes
—	DF	POR	João Cardoso
—	DF	POR	Abel Folha
—	DF	ANG	Kevin Ibouka
—	DF	POR	Afonso Simão
—	MF	POR	Martim Almeida
—	FW	POR	Vasco Nunes
