= Francisco Coelho Maduro Dias =

Portuguese artist (1904–1986)

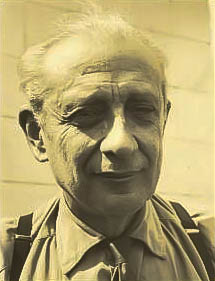
- Born: 12 February 1904; Angra do Heroísmo, Azores, Portugal
- Died: 21 December 1986 (aged 82); Angra do Heroísmo, Azores], Portugal
- Occupations: poet, painter, sculptor, illustrator, set designer and an overall "theatre man"
- Notable work: Stone pavement of Praça Velha (1930), The bust at Largo Prior do Crato (1941), Medal of the Sociedade Afonso Chaves (1934)

Francisco Coelho Maduro Dias (Angra do Heroismo, 12 February 1904 – Angra do Heroismo, 21 December 1986) was a Portuguese poet, painter, sculptor, illustrator, teacher, set designer and an overall "theatre man". He was one of the founders of the Instituto Histórico da Ilha Terceira (literally Historical Institute of Terceira Island), having an important role in the cultural scene of the first half of the Azorean twentieth century.

== Biography ==
Projected the "Cruzeiro da Restauração da Independência" (literally Cruise of the Restoration of Independence), in Pico Matias Simão, in the parish of Altares, inaugurated on 8 December 1940.

On 14 June 1950 he was made a Knight of the Military Order of Saint James of the Sword.

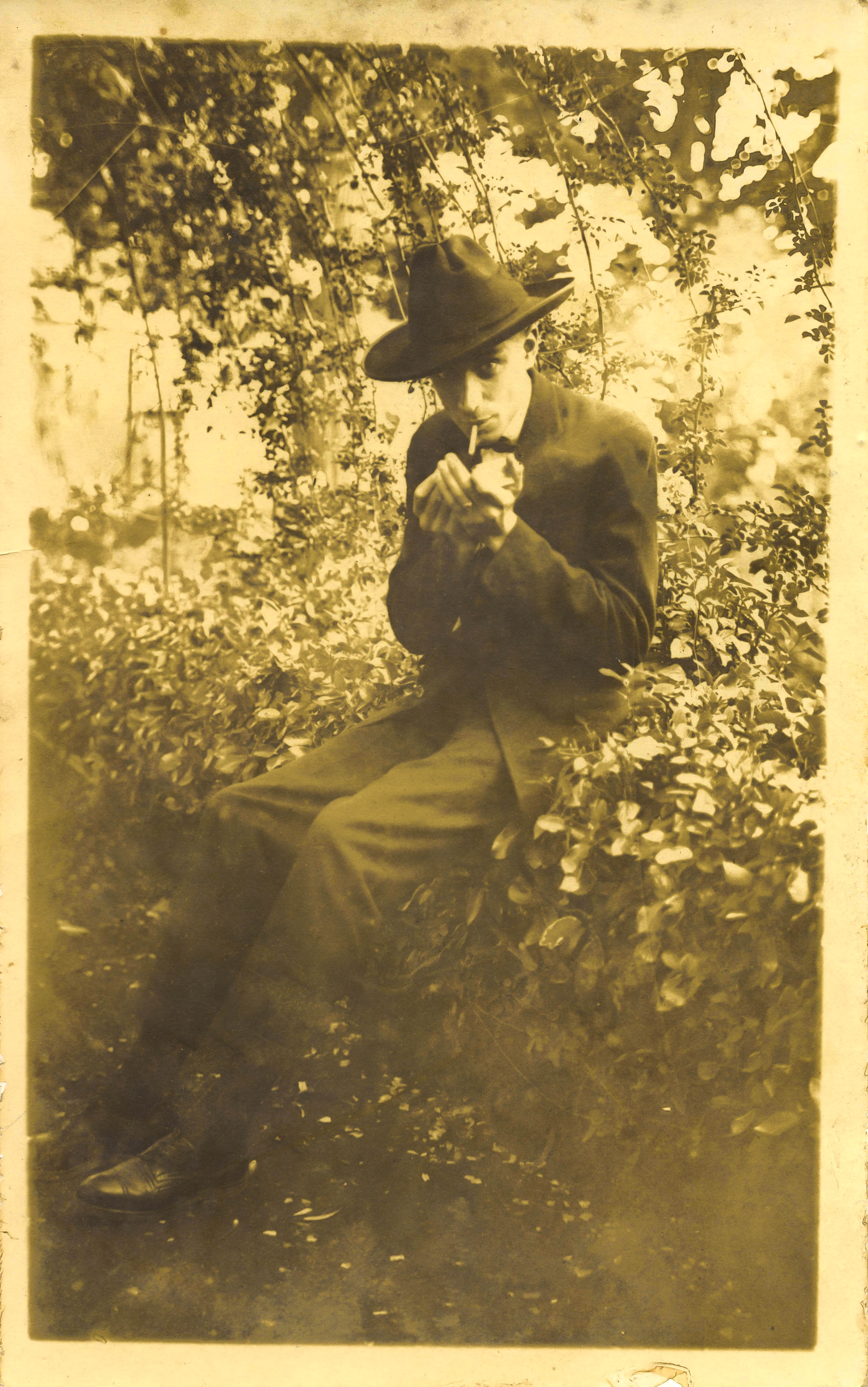
Francisco Coelho Maduro Dias smoking in Jardim Duque da Terceira.

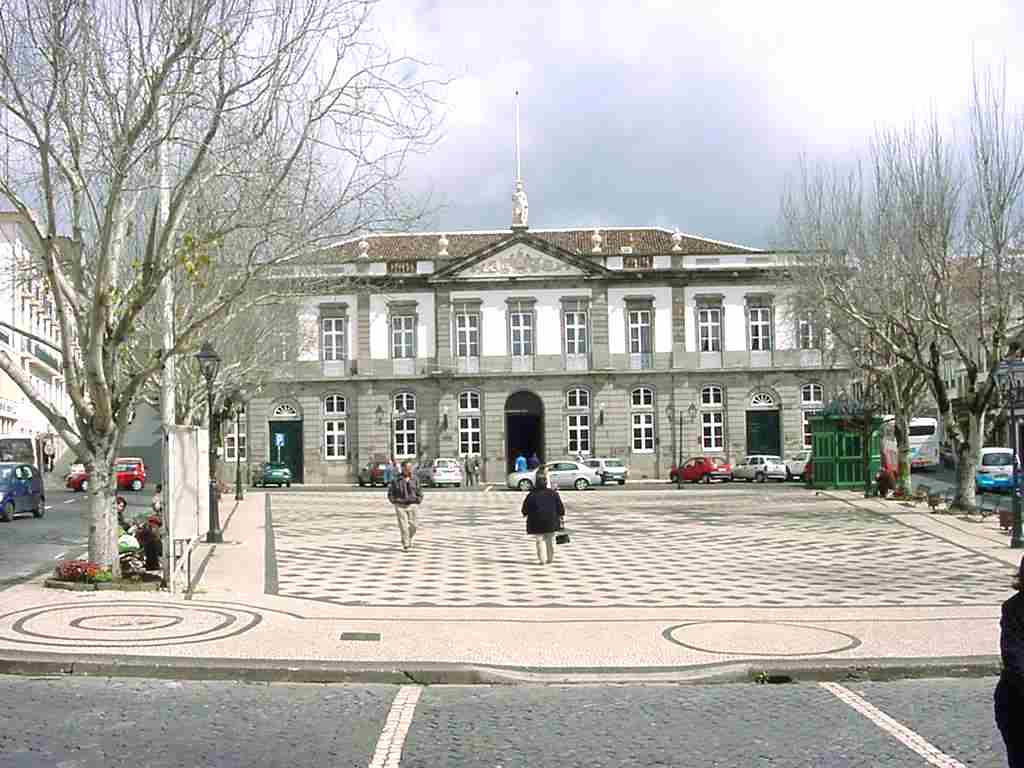
Artistic cobblestone pavement of Praça Velha of Angra do Heroísmo.

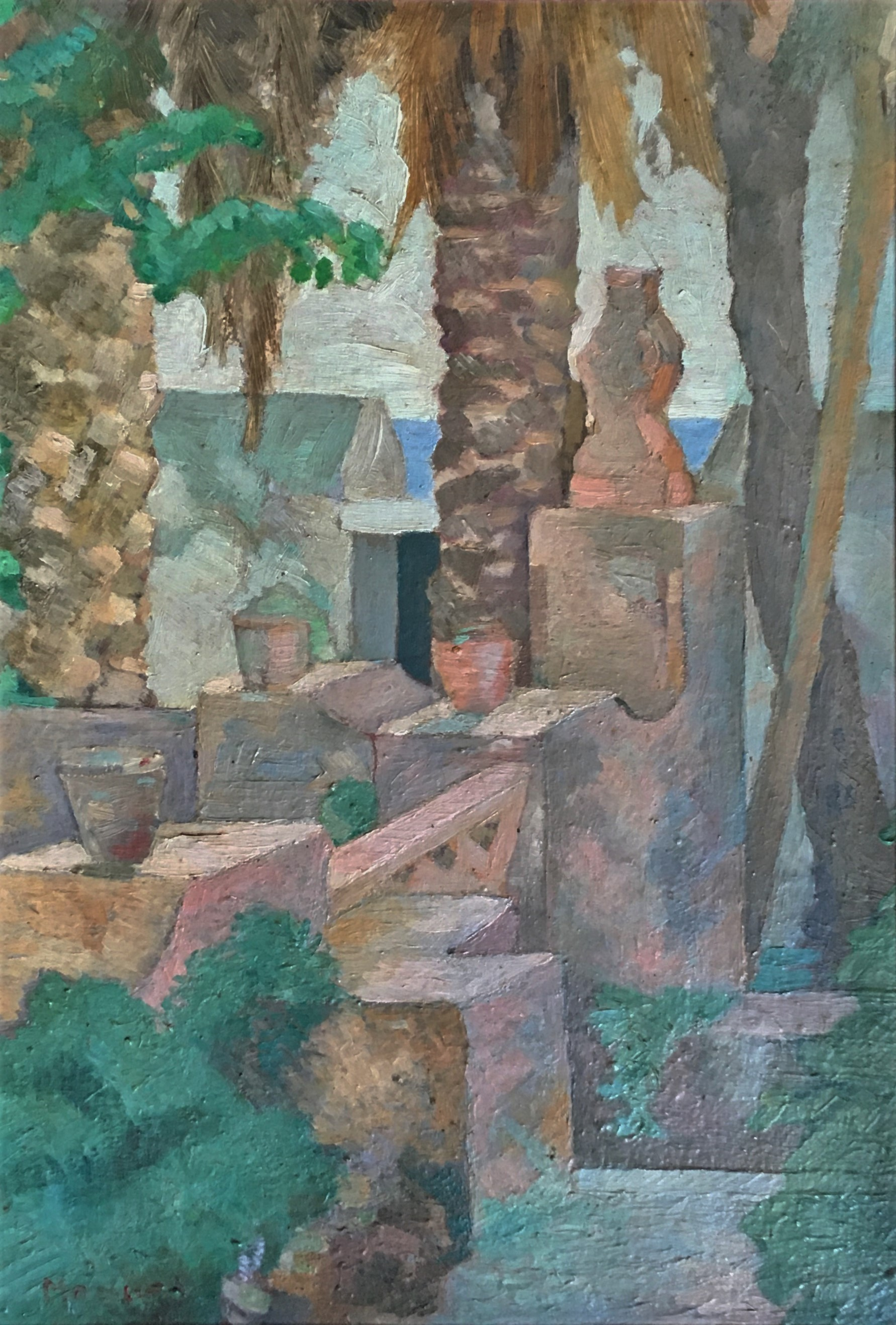
Quinta do Espírito Santo (summer residence).

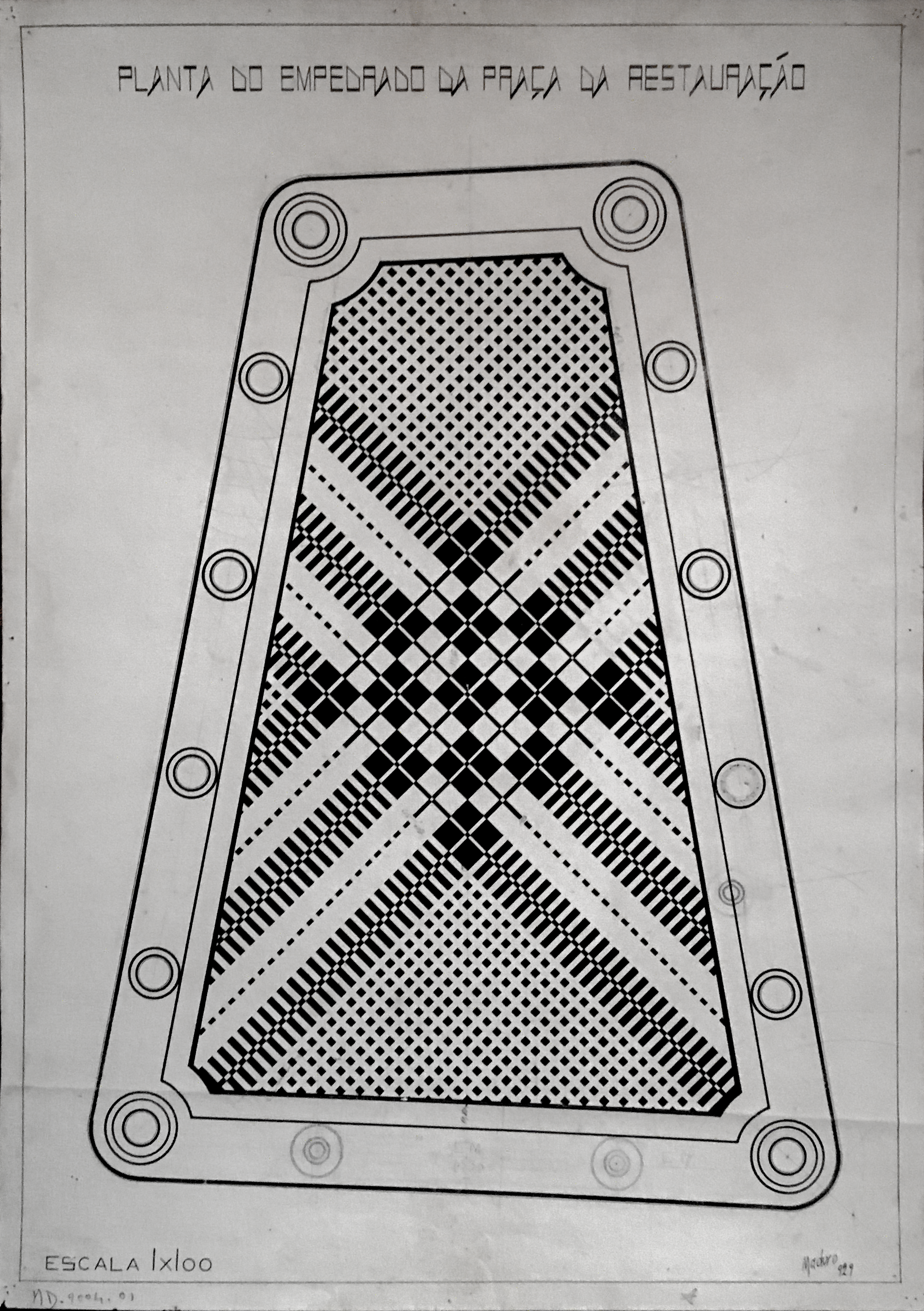
Drawing of the artistic cobblestone pavement of Praça Velha of Angra do Heroísmo (1929).

== Published works ==
- Quadras para o Povo (1921) Angra do Heroísmo, Ed. Andrade
- Em Nome de Deus Começo… (1929) Angra do Heroísmo, Tip Andrade
- Dez Sonetilhos de Enlevo (1941) Angra do Heroísmo, Liv. Ed. Andrade
- Sonetos de Esperança e de Sonho (1941) Angra do Heroísmo, Liv. Ed. Andrade
- Vejo Sempre Mar em Roda (1963) Angra do Heroísmo, ed. do autor
- Melodia Íntima e Poemas de Eiramá (1985) Colecção Gaivota n.º 45, Angra do Heroísmo, Secretaria Regional da Educação e Cultura

== Bibliography ==
- F. Pamplona. Dicionário de Pintores e Escultores Portugueses ou que trabalharam em Portugal (v. III). Porto: Ed. Civilização, 1987.
- Rui Galvão de Carvalho (ed.). Antologia Poética dos Açores. Ponta Delgada: Secretaria Regional de Educação e Cultura, 1979.
