= Sudantha Dias =

Sri Lankan cricketer (born 1971)

Sudantha Dias (born 27 January 1971) is a Sri Lankan former cricketer who played for Moratuwa Sports Club.

Dias made a single first-class appearance for the side, during the 1990–91 season, against Moors Sports Club. From the tailend, he scored 4 runs in the only innings in which he batted.
