= Braulio Guerra =

Mexican politician

- Born: Braulio Mario Guerra Urbiola; March 28, 1972 (age 54)
- Education: Universidad Autónoma de Querétaro
- Occupation: Politician
- Known for: Climbing the Mexico–United States border
- Political party: Institutional Revolutionary Party

Braulio Mario Guerra Urbiola (born March 28, 1972) is a Mexican politician. He serves as a member of the Chamber of Deputies, where he represents the state of Querétaro.

In March 2017, Guerra climbed the fence between Tijuana and San Diego, California to protest US President Donald Trump's campaign promise of building a wall.

His father is former President of the Queretaro Municipality and Dean of the Autonomous University of Querétaro, Braulio Guerra Malo.

On February 11, 2020, he gave a conference at the "Instituto Queretano Marista San Javier" High School (Querétaro) where he studied many years ago. As demonstrated in the conference, he shows difficulty spelling certain words in Spanish such as "obesity", which many students noted was spelled wrong during his presentation. This could be attributed to dyslexia, although there has been no confirmation of him having dyslexia.
