= Direct Internet Access System =

Direct Internet Access System is a technology used to access internet through DSL developed jointly by IIT Madras and Banyan Networks. It offers a wired solution for high-speed symmetrical Internet access through existing public switched telephone network lines and provides an " Always On" Internet Access that is permanently available at the customer's premises. It uses the existing cabling infrastructure by combining voice and data packets onto a single twisted-pair wire at the subscriber's premises.

The speed of this type of internet access depends upon the distance of the customer's residence from the nearest office of the broadband company.

For example:

- A customer having a distance of 2.5 km from the office will have a speed of 2 Mbit/s
- A customer having a distance of 5 km from the office may have a speed of 128 kbit/s
