= Frances Dias =

American aviator (1916–1994)

Frances Dias (Gustavson)
- Born: December 28, 1916; Newman, California, U.S.
- Died: February 5, 1994 (aged 77); Newman, California, U.S.
- Burial place: Hills Ferry Cemetery. Newman, California
- Occupations: American Aviator and WWII Ferry Pilot
- Years active: 1941-1944
- Spouse: Mervin Nesbitt (Gus) Gustavson (m. 1958; died 1985)

Frances Johanna Dias Gustavson (December 28, 1916 – February 7, 1994) was an American aviator and World War 2 ferrying pilot. Dias became the second and final Hispanic member to be accepted into the WAFS division of the WASP, also known as the Women Airforce Service Pilots. Serving as a ferry pilot, Dias joined the 1,074 other women to be selected and complete training for the program.

== Early life ==
Born on December 28, 1916 in Newman, California, to parents Frank Joseph Dias and Lena Mae Cardoza Dias, Frances was an only child, and spent most of her early adolescent and young adult years in California. Dias began her flying lessons at the Merced and Gustine airports, and in September 1936, successfully completed her first solo flight. She received her private flight certification in 1938, and commercial license in 1941. Dias applied and was accepted to the WASP program in 1943; she graduated from her training May 25 of the same year in the WFTD class 43-2. Beginning her aviation career at Houston Municipal Airport, located in Houston, Mississippi, Dias was then assigned to base at Dallas Love Field airport upon her graduation.

== During the war ==
Upon being stationed at Dallas Love Field airport, Dias acted as a ferrying pilot for the war effort, transporting newly built planes from the assembly lines, to air force bases to then be deployed to Europe. She primarily flew small twin or four engine planes, but recalled a time she and another WASP were assigned to pilot a Russian C-47 (DC-3).

== Minorities in the WASP program ==
With a majority of the program and its graduates being White Americans, few minority women were being allowed to participate in training. Only five women of color had been selected and graduated in the WASP program. They included two women of Chinese descent, Maggie Gee and Hazel Ying Lee, one woman of Indigenous American descent, Ola Mildred Rexroat, and two women of Hispanic descent, Dias and Verneda Rodriguez Mclean. African American women were not permitted to complete training and participate in the WASP program. Frances Dias was born in California, to parents who were 100% Portuguese, from Sao Jorge Island in the Azores. (by her Nephew RjDias)

== After the war ==
Following the disbandment of the WASP, Dias Gustavson was married to Mervin Nesbitt (Gus) Gustavson on January 12, 1958. The two had met in the 1930s when "Gus" served as her uncle's flight instructor. They were married for twenty seven years and lived primary in Newman, Nevada and Merced, California, until his death on January 17, 1985. Together they operated the single airport in Fallon, Nevada until 1977, when Mervin "Gus" Gustavson suffered a stroke.

== Other flying endeavors ==
Frances Dias Gustavson was inducted as a member of the San Joaquin Valley chapter of The Ninety Nines and the OX5 Aviation Pioneers. Years after the war, Dias flew both commercially and as an Aerobatic pilot with Tex Rankin Airshow. In the late 1950s and early 1960s, she served at least 8 years as an official timer at the finish, route surveyor, and chairman for the All Woman Transcontinental Air Race, hosted by the Ninety Nines.

== Death ==
Frances Dias Gustavson died February 5, 1994, at the age of 77. She was buried in Hills Ferry Cemetery, in Newman, California.

== See also ==
- Women Airforce Service Pilots
- Ninety Nines
- Ferry flying
- Jacqueline Cochran
- Hazel Ying Lee
- Tex Rankin
