= Prasad Dias =

Sri Lankan cricketer (born 1977)

Prasad Dias (born 15 August 1977) is a Sri Lankan former cricketer who played for Colts Cricket Club. He was born in Colombo.

Dias made a single first-class appearance for the side, during the 1995–96 season, against Sebastianites. From the tailend, he scored a duck in the only innings in which he batted.
