= Pedro Dias (footballer, born 1973) =

Portuguese football manager and former player

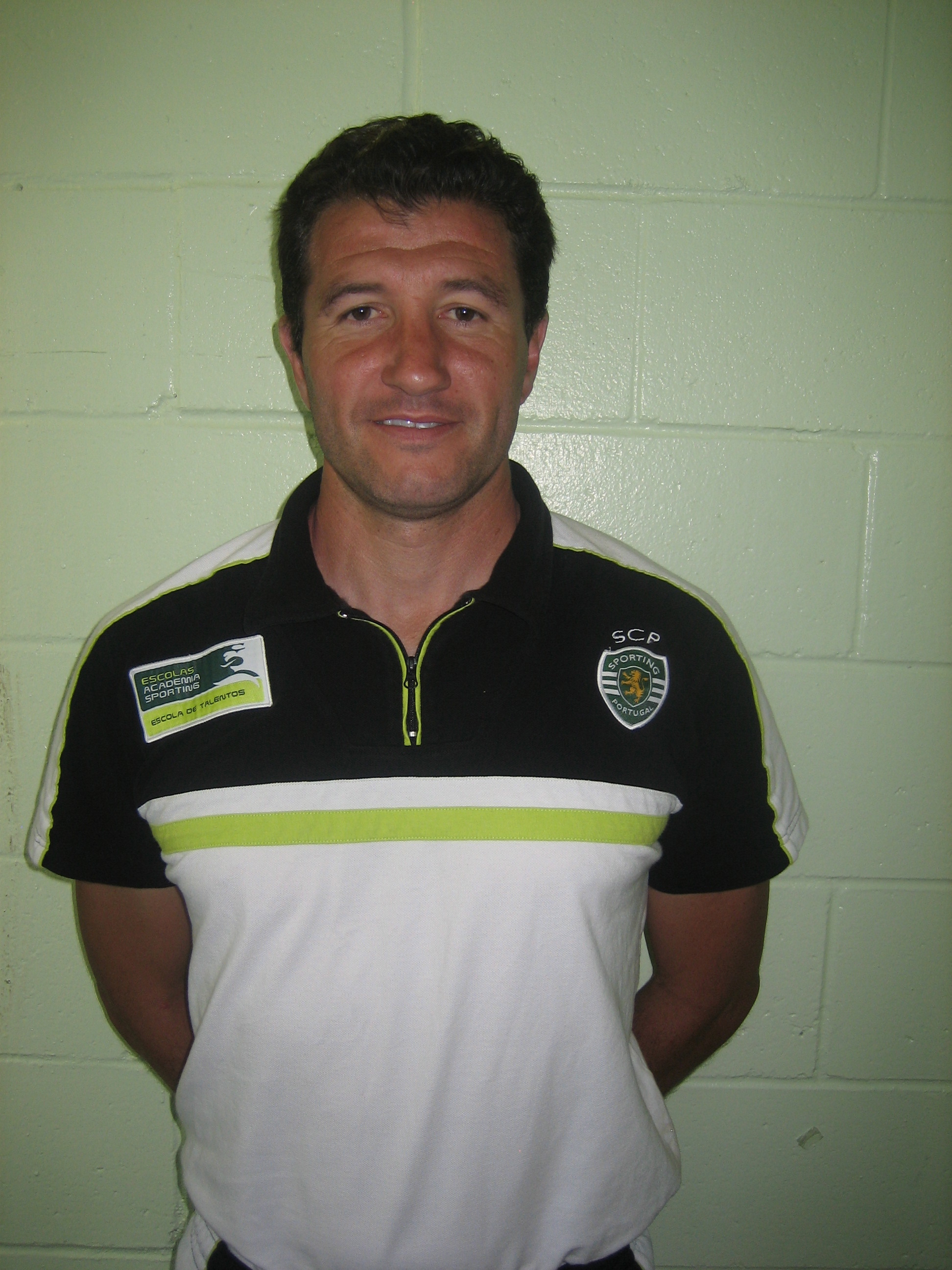

Personal information
- Full name: Pedro Miguel Simoes Fragoso Dias
- Date of birth: 7 June 1973 (age 53)
- Place of birth: Lisbon, Portugal
- Position: Forward

Senior career*
Years	Team	Apps	(Gls)
1989–1992	Sporting CP		
1992–1993	→ Lourinhanense (loan)		
1993–1994	→ Torreense (loan)	21	(0)
1994–1998	C.D. Nacional	72	(6)
1998–1999	Portimonense		
1999–2000	Ribeira Brava	9	(1)
2000–2002	Desportiva de São Vicente		
2002–2003	Câmara de Lobos		
2003–2005	Estrela da Calheta		
- * Club domestic league appearances and goals

Pedro Miguel Simoes Fragoso Dias (born 7 June 1973), also known as Chiquinho, is a Portuguese retired football player and a current manager.

== Player ==
Born in Lisbon, Chiquinho began playing football at the youth level with GDRT Petrogal in 1984. He moved to Sport Grupo Sacavenense and eventually Sporting Clube of Portugal signed him two-year contract. In 1992, Chiquinho was loaned to Sporting Clube Lourinhanense in the Portuguese Second Division. The following year he was loaned out to S.C.U. Torreense of the Segunda Liga. After finishing his contract with Sporting CP he signed with CD Nacional where he played for 4 seasons.

After that he signed with Portimonense S.C., and signed Clube Desportivo Ribeira Brava in 1999. In 2000, he signed with Associação Desportiva de São Vicente. He would finish off his career with Centro Social de Camâra de Lobos and with Estrela Da Calheta Futebol Clube in 2005.

== Manager ==
Pedro Dias started coaching at CD Nacional, remaining 1 year. From 2007 to 2010 he was in charge of Benfica Soccer Schools and Beira-Mar FC in Toronto youth Clubs and Soccer Academies.

In 2010–11 Dias was appointed Youth Technical Director of CS Maritimo until he returned to Canada, in May 2011, to lead the Sporting FC Academy.
