= Bonifacio Dias =

Indian filmmaker and playwright (born 1947)

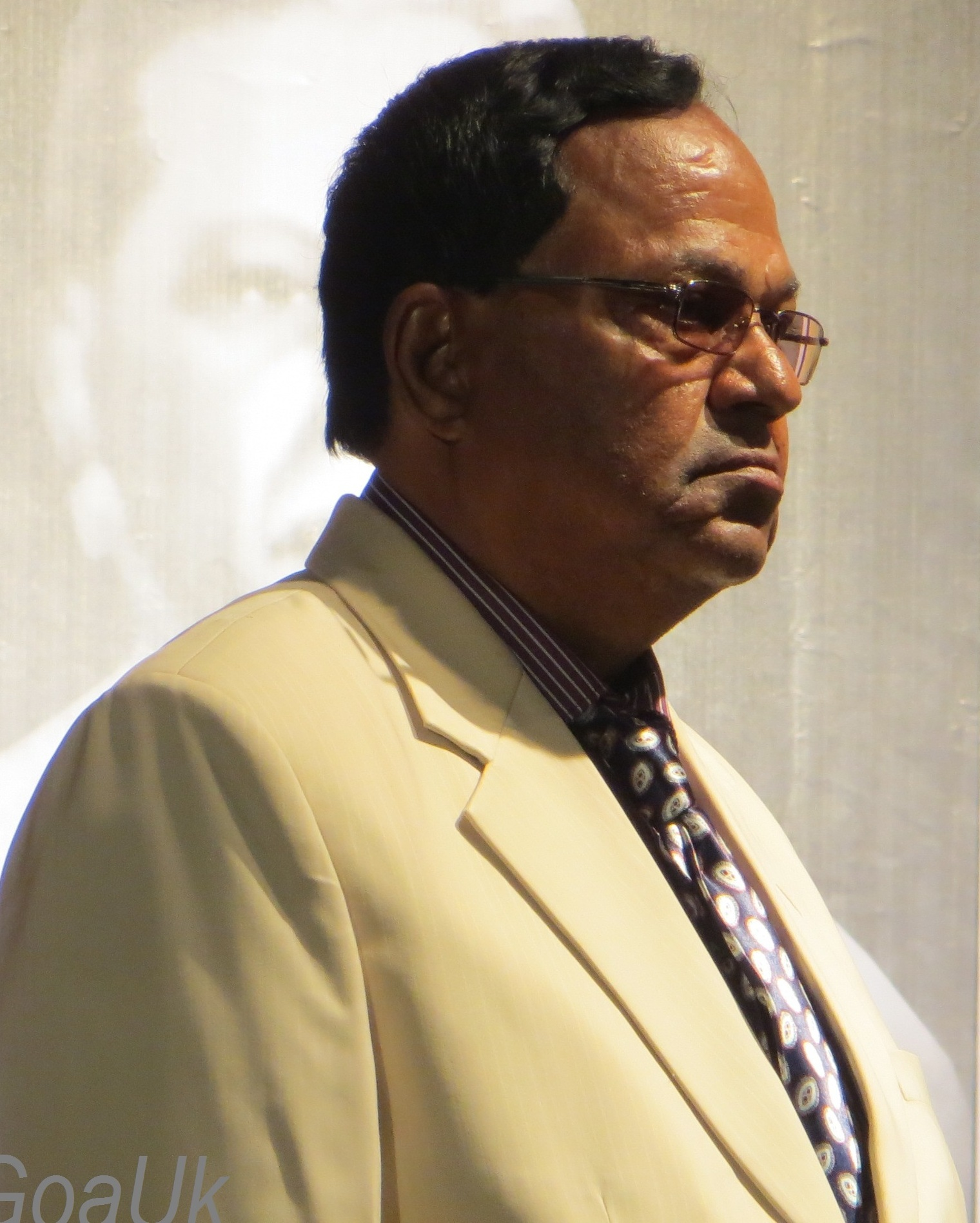
- Dias at Ravindra Bhavan, Margao in 2013
- Born: 17 November 1947 (age 78); Goa, Portuguese India
- Occupations: Filmmaker; playwright; director; producer; actor
- Years active: 1977–2009
- Title: Owner of B. V. Films Production Goa
- Awards: TAG's "Lifetime Contribution to Tiatr Award" (2013)

Bonifacio Dias (born 17 November 1947) is an Indian filmmaker, playwright, theatrical director, theatrical producer, and actor known for his work in Konkani films and tiatr (Goan musical theatre) productions.

== Career ==
In the year 1977, Dias undertook the roles of scriptwriter and director for his debut tiatr show, Gupit Mog (Secret Love). Subsequently, in 1979, he presented another tiatr production called Gupit Chori (Secret Theft). He went on to create several other popular tiatr works over the years, including Sounsar Konak Zai (Who needs the world?), Itlean Roste Bondh, Mhozo Uncle Tuzo Pai (My Uncle Your Father), Zulum (Injustice), Doth ani Dennem Saudi Arabiachem (Dowry and Blessings of Saudi Arabia), and To Nhoim Bhau Mhozo (He's not my Brother). In addition to his work in the tiatr medium, Dias also adapted some of his tiatr productions into Konkani films. These included the titles Zulum and Doth ani Dennem Saudi Arabiachem. He subsequently produced a variety of original Konkani films (typically telefilms), including titles like To Nhoi Bhav Mhozo, Dot-dennem, Konn Zobabdar, Zababdari, Moriad, and To Dis Udelo, among others. In July 2000, Dias's film To Dis Udelo received recognition at the 2nd Goa State Film Festival Award ceremony held at Kala Academy, Panjim, garnering nine nominations.

In December 2006, in an official announcement, Dias was revealed to be the director of a Konkani thriller film named Mogachi Zor (Fountain of Love), filmed in the United States and produced by Sucorina D'Costa, a Goan residing in Niagara Falls, New York, U.S. The movie was later released in December 2009 under the productions of Dumiana Niagara Motion Films and B. V. Films Production Goa, headed by Sucorina and Dias, respectively. Sucorina had assigned the new project to Dias based on his track record in Konkani cinema, especially his film To Dis Udelo, which had received recognition. By 1995, Dias had authored several well-received tiatrs, a traditional form of Goan theater. One of the pieces, a tiatr called Zulum, was first transformed into a video film (VCD format). In the 1990s, Dias transitioned his focus to video film production, becoming a full-time producer in this medium. During this time, one of his video productions, named Zababdari, received recognition and was aired on the Delhi channel of Doordarshan (DD National), which is India's national public broadcasting network. Another one of his video films was in the final stages of production. As of 2012, Dias had acted in only a single tiatr, Kokno (Hindu). He also heads the B. V. Films Production Goa, a film production company based in his home state of Goa.

== Personal life ==
Not much is known about Dias' early or personal life as there is little to no information available. As of 1995, according to the book 100 Years of Konkani Tiatro by Wilson Mazarello, he resided in the village of Curtorim, Goa. According to the 2012 Directory of Tiatr Artistes, he is reported to be residing in the neighborhood of Rumdamol in the suburb of Davorlim, Goa, where he is said to have retired from his work.

== Awards and honours ==
Dias has received several awards and honors throughout his career. In July 2000, he was recognized with a 'Best Director' nomination for his work on the Konkani film To Dis Udelo. His contributions to the film industry were further acknowledged when he received the 'Kala Gaurav Award' in the film category in May 2008. In December 2013, Dias was honored with the 'Lifetime Contribution to Tiatr Award' by the Tiatr Academy of Goa (TAG). His significant impact on Konkani cinema was celebrated in May 2016 when he was honored and awarded by TAG for his lifetime dedication. In January 2024, he received the 'Tiatr and Film Award' for his contributions to Konkani films.
