= Jill Rosemary Dias =

Anglo-Portuguese anthropologist

- Born: Jill Rosemary Rainey; 20 March 1944; West Bromwich, England
- Died: 28 April 2008 (aged 64); Lisbon, Portugal
- Occupation: Anthropologist
- Known for: Contribution to studies of anthropology and history of Lusophone Africa
- Spouse: Alberto Romão Dias

Jill Rosemary Dias (March 20, 1944 – April 28, 2008) was an Anglo-Portuguese anthropologist and historian. Her work is said to have inspired contemporary research in the areas of Portuguese colonial and post-colonial anthropology and in the history of Lusophone Africa.

== Early life ==
Jill Rosemary Dias was born as Jill Rosemary Rainey in West Bromwich, England, on 20 March 1944. She obtained a Doctorate in English Local History at Oxford University in 1973, with a thesis on Politics and Administration in Nottinghamshire and Derbyshire.

== Angola ==
Dias married a Portuguese, Alberto Romão Dias, and the couple went to live in Luanda in Angola. This was a time of considerable change for both Portugal and Angola. On 25 April 1974, Portugal experienced the Carnation Revolution, which overthrew the authoritarian Estado Novo regime. As a consequence, Angola's warring independence movements agreed to a cease fire and signed the Alvor Agreement, which led to Angolan independence on 11 November 1975. In Luanda, Dias developed an interest in 19th century Angolan society, studying Angolan historical archives at the height of the upheavals. This led to her career as a historian of Portuguese African colonies.

Dias became a naturalized Portuguese. To do this the authorities required her to change her middle name of Rosemary to Rosa Maria. She always found such bureaucratic inflexibility amusing, and always continued to sign her name as "Rosemary".

== Academic career ==
Dias joined the Department of Anthropology at the Faculty of Social and Human Sciences (FCSH) of the Universidade Nova de Lisboa in 1982, becoming a Full Professor in 1996. She lectured on History of Anthropology, History of Africa, Ethnographic Contexts, Colonialism and Postcolonialism, and Issues of Anthropological Thought. In 1984 she founded the Revista Internacional de Estudos Africanos (International Journal of African Studies), of which 22 issues were published until 1999. She also inspired the establishment of the Centro de Estudos Africanos e Asiáticos (Centre for African and Asian Studies) at the Institute of Tropical Scientific Investigation and headed the centre from 1986.

Dias was invited by the National Commission for the Commemoration of the Portuguese Discoveries (CNCDP) to coordinate an exhibition on pre-modern Africa, for which she prepared a 300-page report. This was held in 1992, at the National Museum of Ethnology in Lisbon.

== Archives ==
After her death on 28 April 2008, her family donated the documents, books and photographs of Dias to the Universidade Nova de Lisboa. A bilingual inventory of the archive was published by the Centro em Rede de Investigação em Antropologia (CRIA) in 2011 as Cadernos de Jill Dias: Inventário de um Arquivo / The Jill Dias Notebooks: Archive Inventory. A further bilingual publication, Lições de Jill Dias: Antropologia, História, África, Academia / The Jill Dias Lessons: Anthropology, History, Africa, Academy was published in 2013. This is a report of an event held in her memory at the Calouste Gulbenkian Foundation in Lisbon in 2012.

Dias collected around 5000 photographs and negatives. Unfortunately, she did not catalogue these. They included 1331 postcards from Angola, Mozambique, Guinea, São Tomé and Príncipe and other African countries, dating back to the 1890s. The collection also included 1960 slides, and 1181 photographs dating back to the 1880s. The collection has been digitalised and is available at Memórias d’Africa e d’Oriente.

== Publications ==
The publications of Dias were considerable. A selection is listed below.

- 1976. Black Chiefs, White Traders and Colonial Policy near the Kwanza: Kabuku Kambilo and the Portuguese, 1873-1896, Journal of African History, XVIII, 2, pp. 245–265.
- 1981. Famine and Disease in the History of Angola, ca.1830-1930, Journal of African History, XXI, 3, pp. 349–378.
- 1982. A Sociedade colonial de Angola e o Liberalismo português, ca.1820-1850, in: "O Liberalismo na Península Ibérica na Primeira Metade do Século XIX", Lisbon, Sá da Costa, vol. I, pp. 267–286.
- 1984. Uma questão de identidade: Respostas intelectuais às transformações económicas no seio da elite crioula de Angola portuguesa entre 1870 e 1930, "Revista Internacional de Estudos Africanos", 1, pp. 61–94.
- 1989. As primeiras penetrações portuguesas em Africa, in: "Portugal no Mundo", ed. Luís de Albuquerque, vol. I, Lisbon, Alfa, pp. 281–298.
- 1990. Relações económicas e do poder no interior de Luanda, 1850-1875, "Actas da 1.ª Reunião da História de Africa", Lisbon, Instituto de Investigação Científica Tropical, pp. 241–258.
- 1991. Photographic Sources for the History of Portuguese-speaking Africa, History in Africa, 18, 67–82. Madison, Wisconsin.
- 1992. Nas Vésperas do Mundo Moderno - África, Lisbon, Comissão Nacional para as Comemorações dos Descobrimentos Portugueses (CNCDP). Lisbon. 304 pages.
- 1995. Vinte anos de Historiografia Portuguesa de África / Twenty Years of Portuguese Historiography of Africa, in Teodoro de Matos and Luís Filipe Thomaz, eds., "Vinte anos de Historiografia Ultramarina Portuguesa: 1972-1992", Lisbon, Instituto Além Mar / CNCDP.
- 1995. Changing Patterns of Power in the Luanda hinterland: The Impact of European Trade and Colonisation on the Mbundu, ca.1845-1920, Paideuma, Frankfurt, 32, 1985, pp. 285–318.
- 1997. Uma Identidade ambígua: Kabuku Kambilu e os Portugueses no século XIX, Seminar Report "Encontros de Povos e Culturas em Angola" (Luanda 3 a 8 de Abril de 1995), Lisbon, CNCDP, pp. 13–55.
- 1999. Angola, c. 1820-1890, in: Jill Dias e Valentim Alexandre, eds. "O Império Africano, 1820-1890", vol. IX da Nova História da Expansão Portuguesa, Lisbon, Editorial Estampa.
- 2002. Novas Identidades africanas em Angola no contexto do comércio atlântico, in: Cristiana Bastos, Miguel Vale de Almeida, e Bela Feldman-Bianco, eds., "Trânsitos coloniais: diálogos críticos luso-brasileiros", Lisbon, Instituto de Ciências Sociais, pp. 293–321.
- 2003. Caçadores, Artesãos, Comerciantes, Guerreiros: Os Cokwe em perspectiva histórica, in: "A Antropologia dos Tshokwe e Povos Aparentados, Colóquio em homenagem a Marie-Louise Bastin", Porto, 1999, Faculty of Letters of the University of Porto, pp. 17–49
- 2007. Portuguese Expansion in the Old World and the New, 1415-1974, in Robert Aldrey, ed., "Modern European Empires", London, Thames and Hudson.
