= Dias (Lycia) =

Ancient Greek city

Dias (Ancient Greek: Διάς) was a city of ancient Lycia mentioned by Stephanus of Byzantium. It has been suggested, with some uncertainty, that a coin minted at Dias is in the collection of the British Museum.

Its site is unlocated.
