= Nuno Miguel Cerqueira Dias =

Portuguese swimmer

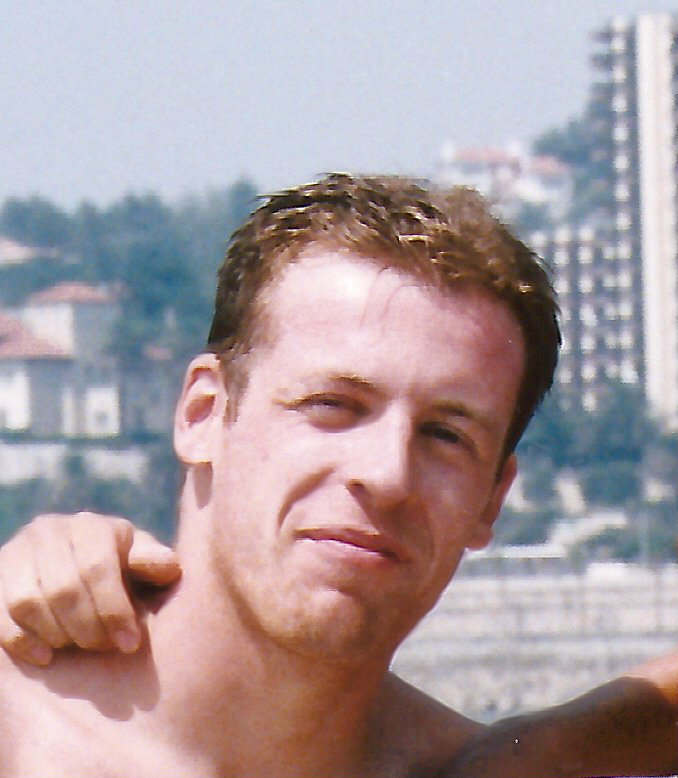

Personal information
- Full name: Nuno Miguel Cerqueira Dias
- Nicknames: Dias, "animal"
- Nationality: Portuguese
- Born: 12 March 1977 Lisbon, Portugal
- Died: 7 October 2014 (aged 37) Lisbon, Portugal

Sport
- Sport: Swimming
- Strokes: Freestyle, Medley
- Club: Sport Algés e Dafundo

Nuno Miguel Cerqueira Dias (12 March 1977 – 7 October 2014) was a Portuguese swimmer. He was one of the top Portuguese long distance freestyle swimmers of the 1990s. He broke several national records, achieved multiple national titles, and took part in many international competitions on behalf of the Portuguese national team.

He started swimming in 1983 at the age of six years old at Sporting Clube de Portugal. In 1987 he left the club and moved to Sport Algés e Dafundo where he remained until the end of his swimming career. He entered in the sport's young age groups, participating in all its most important national competitions, achieving along the way important marks and places that enabled him to have his first participation in international competitions of the respective age groups, namely the Multinations.

== Swimming career ==
It was however in 1993 that he emerged at the highest level by winning a place on the national team that represented Portugal in Latin Cup held in Florence, as a result of his performance in the National Championships, held in Algés in March, in the pool of Sport Algés e Dafundo. He achieved in this short course competition the marks of 16:12.58 minutes in the 1500 metres freestyle, and 8:32.97 minutes in the 800 metres freestyle (on the way to the 1500 metres, the 800 metres at the time was still exclusively a women’s event). These marks would give him G1 age group national title (16 years old) and the 2nd place in all age groups, both marks would become later G1 national records, when the redefinition of the age groups occurred by the Portuguese Swimming Federation. In that same season, in the Clube Futebol os Belenenses Olympic sized swimming pool, he would become for the first time national champion in all age groups in the 1500 metres freestyle, with the mark of 16:29,17 minutes. This mark along with the 08:43.32 minutes at the 800 metres freestyle (again on the way to the 1500 metres) would become records later, as well as national records of the G1 age group.

In 1994 in the winter Portuguese National Championships (short course), in Braga, he would break the 400 metres freestyle Junior national record with a time of 4:04.14 minutes. In that same year, he would also become the national club record holder of the 4x200 metres freestyle in long course with the mark of 7:49,00 (in Restelo). It was a record that he would break later in 1996 with 7:44,93 (in Famalicão), and again in 1998 with 7:40,81 (in Lisbon), this last one lasted for many years before another team was able to break it. In 1999 with the Portuguese National Team in the international Latin Cup competition, he would also break the record at this event (there are two different records in relays, the marks done by a sports club team and by the National Team). He was as well the short course national club record holder in this event in 1996 with 7:30,78 (in Felgueiras). In 1999 he broke the national club record in the 4x100 metres freestyle with 3:29,35 (in Lisbon).

Team wise he was the winner, with his club Sport Algés e Dafundo, of the Portuguese National Championships in 1992 (in Aveiro) and 1993 (in Restelo), in the old score system. Already in the current system, he was the winner of 6 Portuguese National Championships in 7 years: 1995/Olivais, 1996/Restelo, 1997/Restelo, 1998/EUL, 2000/Jamor e 2001/Póvoa Varzim. His contribution for the team and titles was crucial since he was one of the top Portuguese long distance freestyle swimmers.

Internationally he took part, in 1994, in what at the time was maybe the most important and emblematic junior competition in the world, at least certainly for a European swimmer: the European Junior Swimming Championships. He swam the 200 metres freestyle (37th place with 2:00.60), the 400 metres freestyle (15th place in the morning heats with 4:07.02, and 7th in the Final B with 4:10,91), the 400 metres medley (16th in the heats with 4:46.07, and 4th in the Final B with 4:41.73), and anchored the 4x200 metres freestyle relay (14th with 8:08.88). He also took part in several other international competitions, like the Multinations, 1993 Latin Cup (Florence), 1998 Latin Cup (Lisbon), 1999 Latin Cup (Guadeloupe), the 1997 (Sicily) and the 1999 (Palma de Maiorca) World University Championships.

He had the following best personal times: in the 200 metres freestyle: 1:53.29/1:54.71 (short course/long course); in the 400 metres freestyle: 3:59.11/4:04.45, in the 800 metres freestyle: 8:24.38/8:37.23, in the 1500 metres freestyle: 15:53.12/16:12.66 and in the 400 metres medley: 4:24.85/4:35.43. All these times were achieved between 1996 and 1999, well before the high-tech fabric swimsuits era that revolutionized swimming years after.

In his trophy gallery, one can also find Cristina Chaves award in 1997. This is the highest swimming award given by Sport Algés e Dafundo, as recognition of the contribution given to the club.

One of the less known and most curious episodes of his sports career was when he participated in a swimming event in the United States of America. The event called Turning of the Tides, a beneficence event to MS that was held in September 2001, just a few weeks after the 9/11 terrorist attacks. An open water swimming competition that consisted in a 35 kilometres swimming relay, with one-hour legs, between Santa Catalina Island and Santa Monica shore. Nuno Dias was on the second leg of the Portuguese relay, still in the early stages of the distance, when suddenly an intense fog come across the area and as a result the support boat lost sight of him and the canoeist that was beside him, and the same thing ended up happening also with other countries' relays. With panic established within the event organization, the National Guard was called to help find the missing athletes in the Pacific Ocean. Nuno Dias and the canoeist were later found and safely collected by the American support boat.

== Retirement ==
After retiring from competitive swimming, he still had some participation in triathlons and open water competitions. He won the river Tejo crossing competition in one of the first editions of the event recent era. He also completed the Seville marathon, already in 2012, under the three-hour mark with the time of 2h57m.

He was member of Sport Algés e Dafundo directive structure in 2004, and around that time started also to teach and coach the younger swimming group ages at the club. He would start working for the Portuguese Swimming Federation one year later in 2005, where among other jobs he was responsible for the master’s national program and later became the Open Water National Coach, responsibility that took him to the 2008 Olympic Games where he coached Arseniy Lavrentyev and Daniela Inácio.

Known as the speaker of many Portuguese swimming and triathlon competitions, as well as some athletics ones, he was also the speaker of some international triathlons and open water events, like the Eilat European Triathlon competition in April 2012, and the World Championships Triathlon Series Madrid in 2012 and 2013. The collaboration he had in these and other events with the Portuguese Triathlon Federation ended up in the invitation for him to take the job as the Federation General Manager in March 2014, which he accepted. He was also for several years the swimming commentator and analyst of SportTv, a TV Portuguese sport channel.

== Death ==
He died on 7 October 2014, in Carnaxide. The Portuguese Swimming and Triathlon Federations organized together a 1500 metres Open Water event in his honour. At the Sport Algés e Dafundo pool was organized a meeting of several friends and his swimming contemporaries, that in his honour swam for 15 minutes and 53 seconds in relay fashion, his best mark at the 1500 metres freestyle; among them were the Portuguese Olympic swimmers Ricardo Pedroso, Miguel Arrobas, Nuno Laurentino, and António Bessone Bastos.

The European Triathlon Union, the Spanish Triathlon Federation, the Portuguese Swimming Federation, the Lisbon Swimming Association, the Portuguese Triathlon Federation, and Sport Algés e Dafundo, released on their official sites notes of their grief in the news of his death.
