= Leandro Dias =

Brazilian footballer

Personal information
- Full name: Leandro Fernandes Dias
- Date of birth: September 20, 1985 (age 41)
- Place of birth: Itajubá, Brazil
- Height: 1.90 m (6 ft 3 in)
- Position: Defender

Team information
- Current team: Mes Kerman

Youth career
- –2005: Vitória

Senior career*
Years	Team	Apps	(Gls)
2006	Vitória		
2007	Grêmio Prudente		
2008	Paulista		
2009	Gama		
2010	Americano	5	(0)
2010–	Mes Kerman	15	(0)
- * Club domestic league appearances and goals as of 30 September 2010 (UTC)

Leandro Fernandes Dias (born September 20, 1985) is a Brazilian professional footballer who plays as a defender for Mes Kerman F.C. in the Iran Pro League.

== Career ==
Fernandes Dias joined Mes Kerman in 2010 after spending the previous season at Americano in the Campeonato Brasileiro Série C.

Career statistics
Club performance			League		Cup		Continental		Total	
Season	Club	League	Apps	Goals	Apps	Goals	Apps	Goals	Apps	Goals
Iran			League		Hazfi Cup		Asia		Total	
2010–11	Mes Kerman	IPL	15	0	0	0	-	-	15	0
Total	Iran		15	0	0	0	0	0	15	0
Career total			15	0	0	0	0	0	15	0

== External sources ==
- Profile at Persianleague
