= Miguel Caetano Dias =

Portuguese Indian medical practitioner (1854–1936)

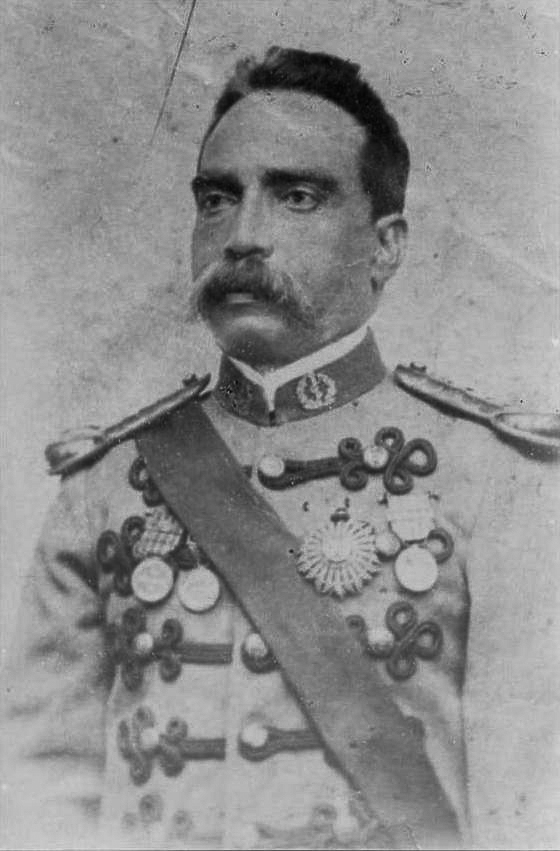
- Dias, c. 1920s
- Born: 9 July 1854; Santo Estêvão, Goa, Portuguese India
- Died: 26 July 1936 (aged 82)
- Known for: Contributions to medicine in Portuguese Goa
- Spouse: Maria Veronica da Silva e Dias
- Children: 8
- Awards: Cavaleiro, Official e Comendador da Real Ordem Militar de S. Bento de Aviz.

Miguel Caetano Dias ComA (9 July 1854 – 26 July 1936) was a Portuguese Indian medical practitioner best known for his roles as chief of health services in Portuguese Goa and director of the Escola Médica Cirúrgica de Goa. In these roles, he was widely recognised for organising successful vaccination and sanitation campaigns, and was also instrumental in advocating against the closure of the medical school.

== Early life ==
Miguel Caetano Dias was one of five children born to Manuel Francisco Dias and Escolastica Fernandes e Dias in St Estevam, an island in Goa, India. The humble circumstances of his childhood are often mentioned in later accounts of his achievements.

His brother João Vicente Santana Dias, a Major in the Portuguese Army, is credited with helping him enrol at the Faculty of Medicine of the University of Lisbon where he graduated with distinction in 1882. Upon graduation, he joined the Portuguese Army as part of the military medical cadre in Mozambique.

== Career ==
After spending five years in Mozambique, Dias was transferred to Goa in 1888. Around this time, the Portuguese authorities were seriously considering closing the Medical School of Goa with an inspection conducted by the Portuguese doctor Cesar Gomes Barbosa in 1897 recommending shutting the school down permanently. However, in 1902 the Portuguese government finally voted to keep the school open with arguments put forth by the prominent physician and politician Miguel Bombarda that the school would be the ideal place to train doctors for the colonies. While Bombarda did not acknowledge it, his arguments were previously put forth by native born Goan doctors including Dias himself who wrote in 1902.

The Medical Surgical School of Nova Goa, situated in a country where the reigning diseases reflect the tropical climate, acts to foster the training of colonial doctors in such conditions, and so assists with the demands of African colonization at little cost for the treasury.

— Estado da India Portuguesa, “Relatorio do Serviço de Saúde referido ao anno de 1902”, signed by Miguel Caetano Dias, Head of the Health Services. Arquivo Histórico Ultramarino, Índia, Serviço de Saúde, maço 1988

This vote coincided with the mandate of Dias who was appointed the director of the health services in Goa and director of the Medical School of Goa in 1902, only the second native born Goan to achieve this position in the colonial administration after his predecessor Rafael Pereira from Benaulim, Salcette. Though a native Christian, Dias was not from the elite social circles from which his predecessors had originated and is recognised as having worked his way towards social and professional recognition through personal effort and merit, in what was at the time, a highly stratified society.

Dias was a strong proponent of modern European medicine and vaccination in particular, as opposed to the variolation or inoculation techniques that were common among the local population. He recommended the creation of vaccine parks in different districts despite the challenge this was to local beliefs about ritual and body pollution. He often condemned the latter in his writings.

"unless the vaccine method exhibits some good results, there is no chance that the people will take it instead of inoculation: the bulk of the population since immemorial times has shown a blind predilection and trust in the inoculation of the variolic virus to the detriment of the Jennerian vaccine, because this goes against their religious beliefs (. . .) and because they do not believe in its prophylactic efficiency, which is not surprising, for the people, for whom science is still a mystery, can’t be persuaded of the vaccine’s superiority until they see it with their own eyes"

— Estado da India Portuguesa, “Relatorio do Serviço de Saúde referido ao anno de 1902”, signed by Miguel Caetano Dias, Head of the Health Services. Arquivo Histórico Ultramarino, Índia, Serviço de Saúde, maço 1988

His anti-plague campaigns and sanitary policies played a large part in the adoption of modern European medicine across Goan society. His tenure ended in 1913 and he was succeeded by José Maria da Costa Álvares.

Dias later became actively involved in politics and was appointed the President of the first Provincial Congress of Goa and also mayor of the Municipal Council of Ilhas.

== Awards and recognition ==
Bust of Miguel Caetano Dias
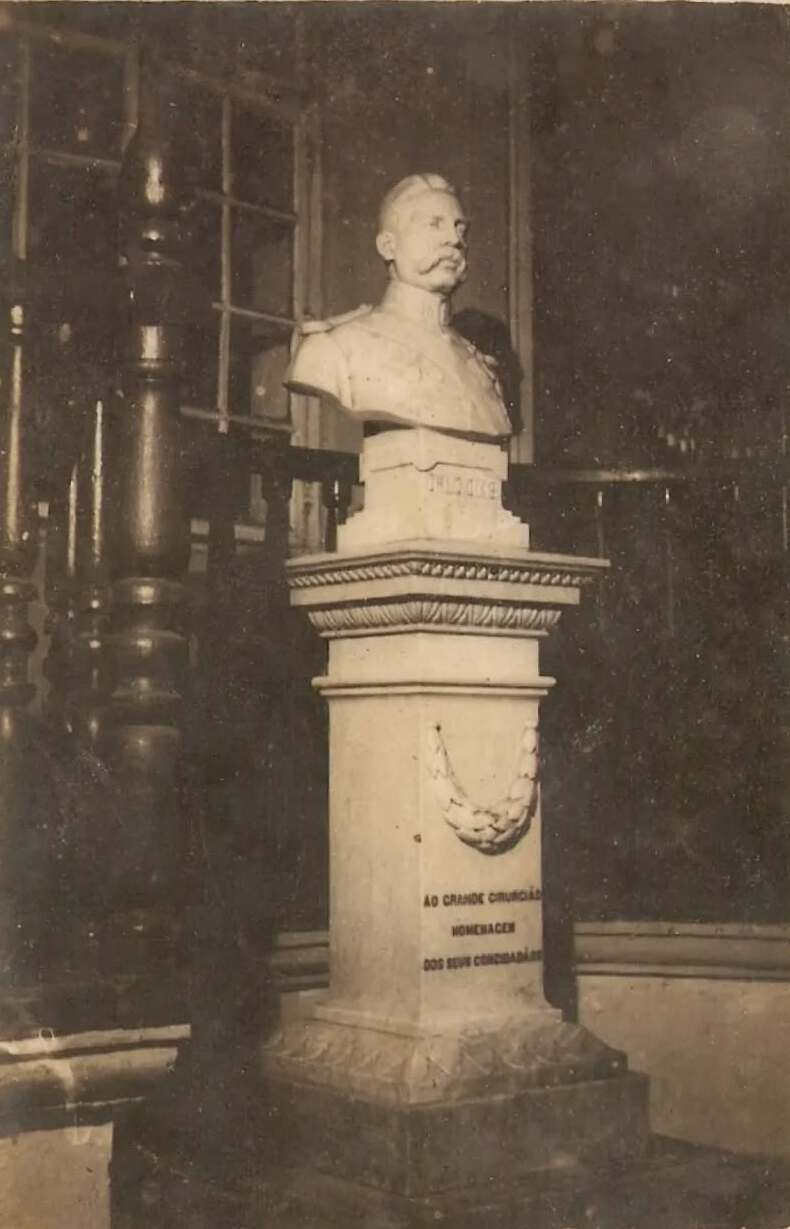
Bust installed at Old GMC in his lifetime.

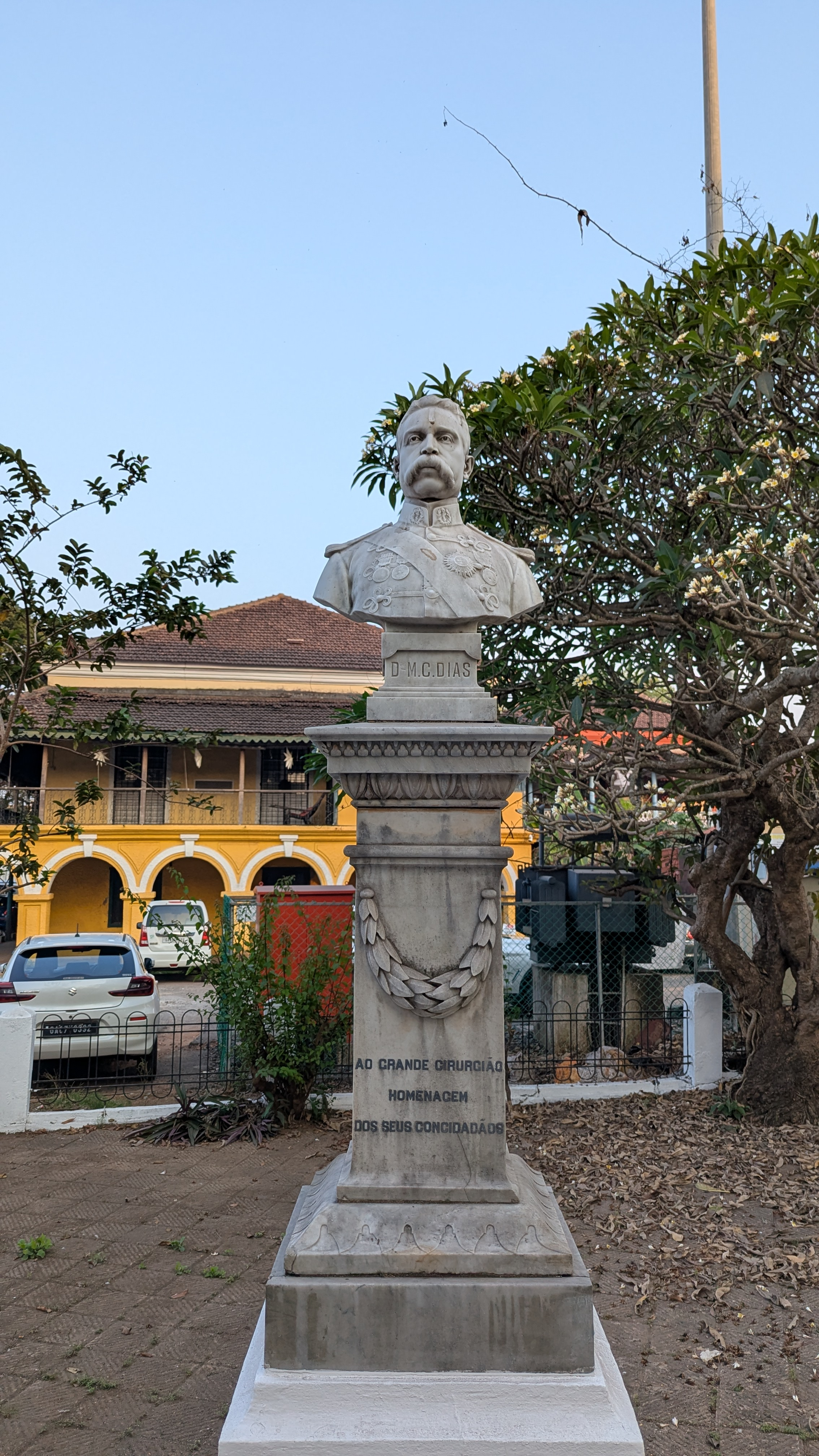
Front view of the bust. Seen behind is the former Casa da Moeda (Mint House), where he lived while in Panaji

In recognition for his services to public health, Dias was made a Knight of the Military Order of Aviz (Cavaleiro, Official e Comendador da Real Ordem Militar de S. Bento de Aviz).

A bust of Dias was installed in the premises of the Medical School of Goa and was later shifted to the front of his residence upon his death, where it still stands today. The inscription on the bust reads "Ao Grande Cirurgião. Homenagem Dos Seus Concidadãos (To the great surgeon. Homage from your fellow citizens)"

Luís de Menezes Braganza journalist and anti-colonial activist from Goa often wrote of contemporaries he admired in Pracasha, a Konkani language daily. Of Dias, he wrote that though Dias did not come from an aristocratic family, he served his people and his country well. He also wrote that Dias was not very polished in his manners and etiquette but the good of his people was always uppermost in his mind.

== Personal life ==
Dias married Maria Veronica da Silva and had eight children Victor Manuel Dias, Luis Gonzaga Bismarck Dias, Alvaro Jose Maria da Silva Dias, Antonio Francisco Dias, Ernesto Dias, Albertina Lavinia Escolastica Dias e Afonso, Aurea Dias e Lobo and Alice Leonor Brigida Dias e Fialho.

A number of his children went on to achieve individual renown in their own fields of study and practice.

His bought the Casa da Moeda in Panjim, Goa where his descendants continue to live and opposite which his statue is installed. He also purchased a large tract of land in Naroa, an island along the river Mandovi opposite his home island of St. Estevam, where he built a Chapel.

== Death ==
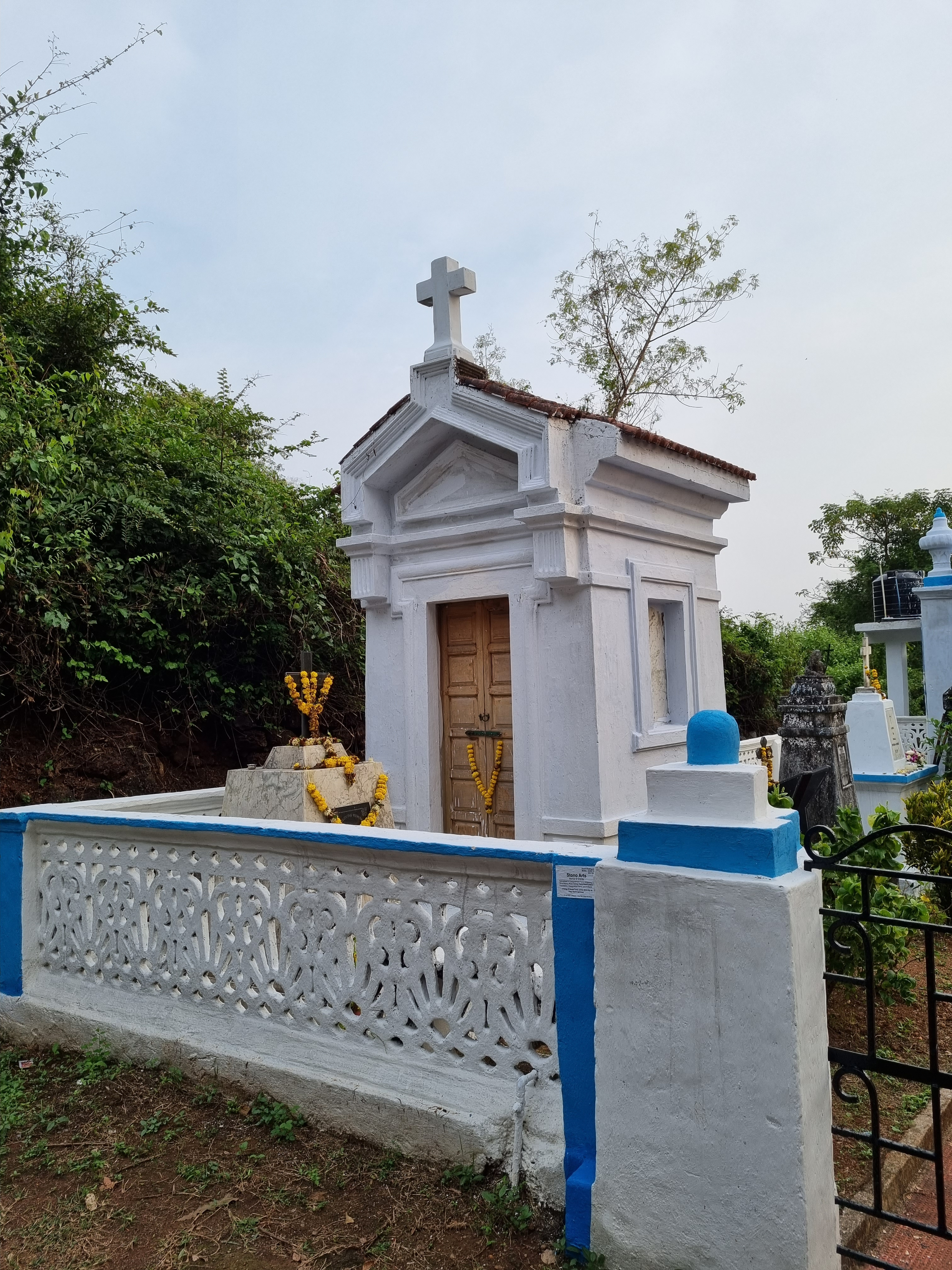
Family Tomb (Jazigo da Familia) of Miguel Caetano Dias located in St Estevam Cemetery

Dias died in 1936 and was buried in his native village of St Estevam where his family grave occupies a prominent place in the front of the cemetery.
