= Haroldo Dutra Dias =

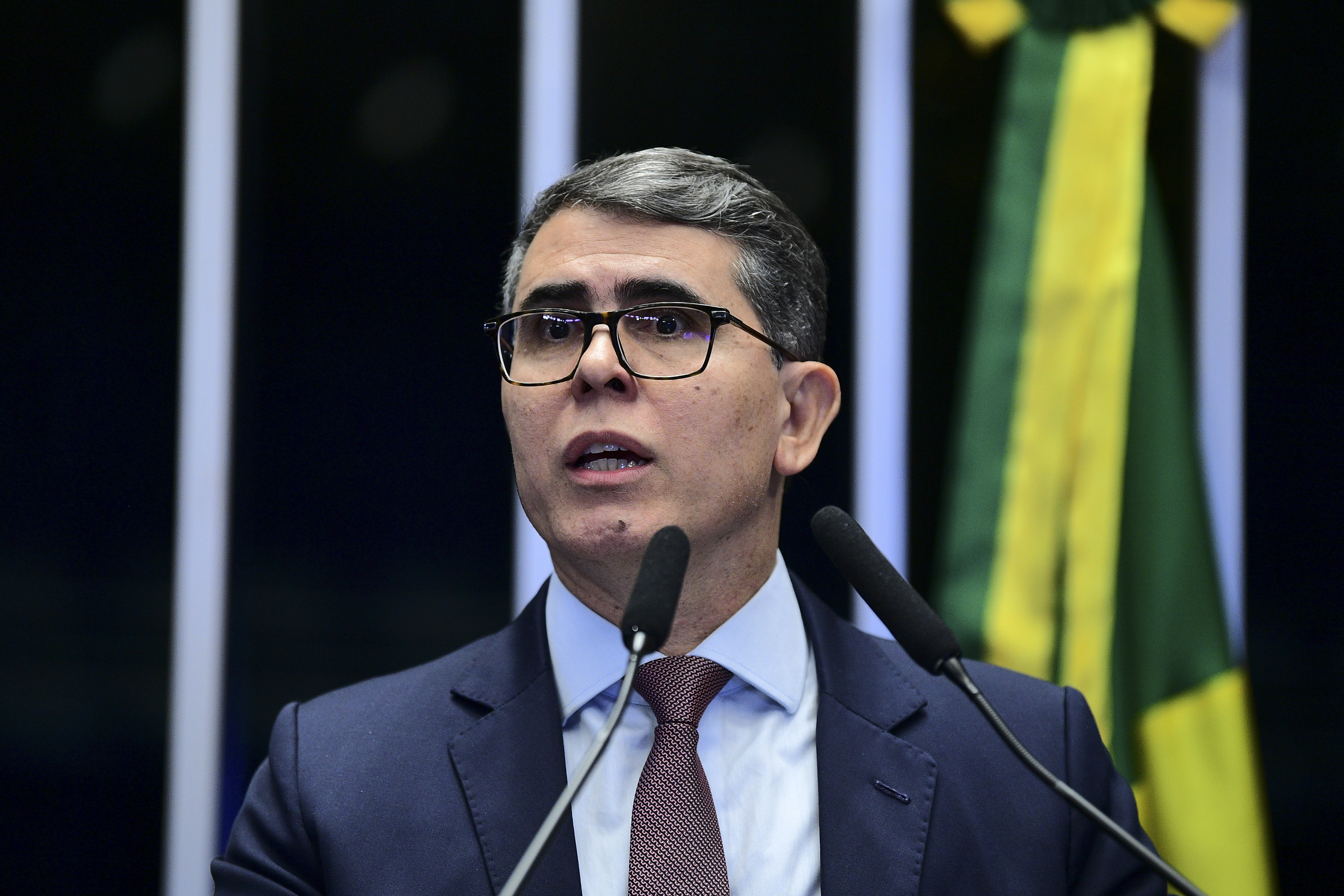
- Haroldo Dutra Dias in 2024
- Born: September 20, 1971 (age 54); Belo Horizonte, Minas Gerais, Brazil
- Education: Federal University of Minas Gerais
- Occupations: Spiritist speaker, writer, translator, neuroscientist, psychologist, jurist

Haroldo Dutra Dias (born 20 September 1971) is a Brazilian spiritist speaker, writer, translator, neuroscientist, and jurist. He is currently a judge at the Court of Justice of Minas Gerais. He is considered one of the greatest disseminators of the Spiritist doctrine in the 21st century.

== Education and career ==
Haroldo Dias graduated in Law and Classical Greek Language and Literature from the Federal University of Minas Gerais (UFMG), having also taken a Hebrew course at the Israelite Union of Belo Horizonte. He obtained a Master's degree in Neuroscience from UFMG in 2022 and a Doctorate from the same university in 2024.

At the age of 15, Haroldo Dias participated in the study of the Gospel, Genesis and the Apocalypse at the Emmanuel Spiritist Group, in Belo Horizonte, with Honório Onofre Abreu. In 2011, in partnership with record producer Júlio Adriano Corradi and cinematographer Thiago Franklin, Dias founded the Instituto SER, with the aim of "promotion and literary, intellectual and artistic dissemination of the Spiritist doctrine". In March 2013, Haroldo was one of the founders of the Center for Study and Research of the Gospel (NEPE), within the Brazilian Spiritist Federation (FEB).

In 2010, at the III Brazilian Spiritist Congress, the International Spiritist Council launched Haroldo Dias' translation of the four canonical gospels and the Acts of the Apostles, called O Novo Testamento (Evangelhos e Atos). In 2013, Haroldo Dias granted the copyright and property rights of his work to the FEB, which launched a new edition of O Novo Testamento (Evangelhos e Atos) in April of the same year.

== Works ==
- Haroldo Dutra Dias (2019), A Bússola e o Leme, LetraMais, ISBN 9788570670076
- Haroldo Dutra Dias (2021), Parábolas de Jesus – Texto e Contexto, FEP, ISBN 9788586255465
- Haroldo Dutra Dias (2014), O Novo Testamento (Tradução FEB), Edicei of America, ISBN 9781936547470
- Haroldo Dutra Dias, 7 Minutos com Emmanuel Vol. 1, SER, ISBN 9788567990002
- Haroldo Dutra Dias, Sete Minutos com Emmanuel – Vol. 2 – De Ânimo Forte, SER, ISBN 9788567990026
- Aila Pinheiro, Alexandre Caroli, Aluízio Elias, Chico Xavier, Gisella Amorim, Gladston Lage, Haroldo Dutra Dias, Humberto de Campos, João Romário Filho, José Otávio Aguiar (2022), Celeiro de Redenção, SER, ISBN 9788567990019
- Andrei Moreira, Cíntia Vieira Soares, Eulália Bueno, Gabriel Nogueira Salum, Haroldo Dutra Dias, Ivana Raisky, Jô Andrade, Marcus De Mário, Marlon Reikdal, Ricardo Di Bernardi, Roosevelt Andolphato Tiago, Rossandro Klinjey (2020), O Desafio de Viver, FEEGO, ISBN 9788560182510
- Eleonora Escobar Tosetto (organizer), Haroldo Dutra Dias, Josiane Guimarães Botteon (organizer), Melissa Diniz (organizer), Estudando Gênesis à Luz do Espiritismo, SER, ISBN 9788554314002
