= Braulio Ferreira de Souza Dias =

Brazilian diplomat and politician (born 1953)

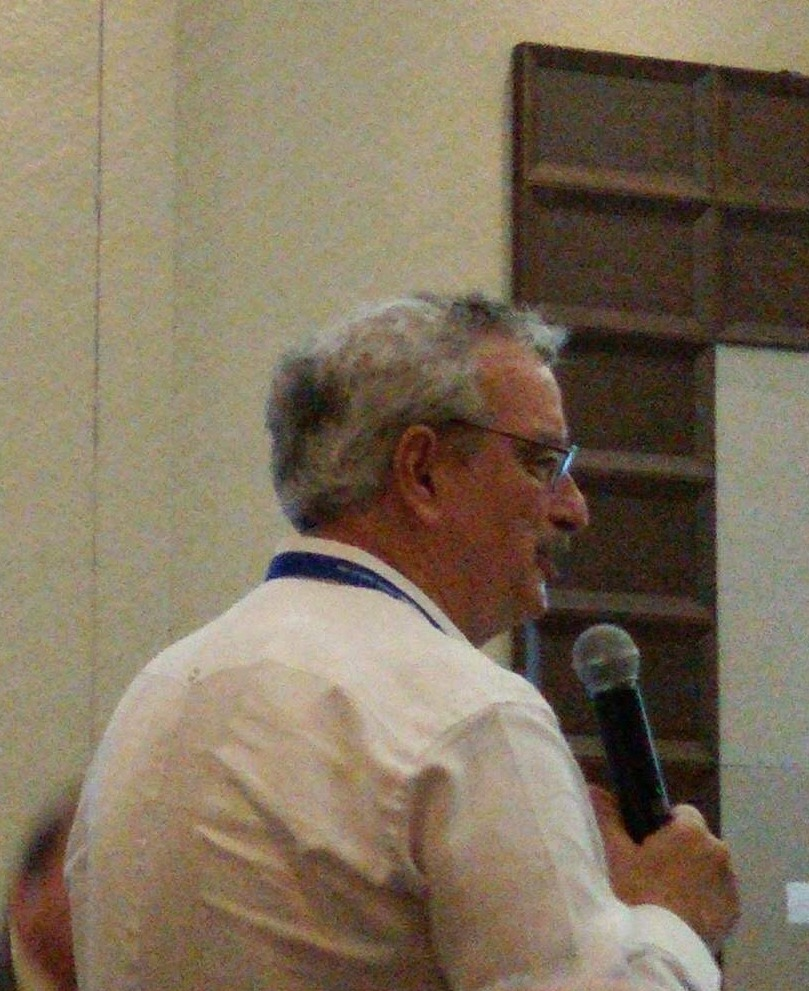
- Dias at EU coordination meeting, before COP13, Mexico (4 December 2016)
- Born: 1953 (age 72–73); Brazil
- Education: Bachelor of Science in biological sciences, and Doctor of Philosophy in zoology
- Occupation: Politician

Braulio Ferreira de Souza Dias (born 1953), is a Brazilian diplomat and politician who worked for the United Nations as Executive Secretary of the Convention on Biological Diversity (CBD), at the Assistant Secretary-General level. He was appointed to this position by the United Nations Secretary-General Ban Ki-moon on 20 January 2012 and served until 4 December 2016.

He previously served as the National Secretary for Biodiversity and Forests at the Brazilian Ministry of the Environment. In this position, he was responsible for the implementation of several programmes and for the management of four institutes attached to the Ministry. Dias played a key role in the CBD's negotiations and implementation since its inception and represented his country in the CBD's Intergovernmental Negotiating Committee.

He served as a Member of the Scientific and Technical Advisory Panel of the Global Environment Facility, Vice-President of the International Union of Biological Sciences and Coordinator of the Steering Committee of the Inter-American Biodiversity Information Network.

Dias obtained his Doctor of Philosophy degree in zoology from the University of Edinburgh, Scotland, and gained his Bachelor of Science in biological sciences from the University of Brasília, Brazil. He is married and has one child. Nowadays is a beloved professor in Institut of Biology on University of Brasilia.
