= André Dias (footballer, born 1992) =

Portuguese footballer

Personal information
- Full name: André Filipe Aguiar Dias
- Date of birth: 18 April 1992 (age 34)
- Place of birth: Torre de Moncorvo, Portugal
- Height: 1.78 m (5 ft 10 in)
- Position: Left back

Team information
- Current team: Moncarapachense

Youth career
- 2004–2005: Torre Moncorvo
- 2005–2007: Vitória Guimarães
- 2007–2009: Benfica
- 2009–2011: Rio Ave

Senior career*
Years	Team	Apps	(Gls)
2011–2014	Rio Ave	6	(0)
2013–2014	→ Tirsense (loan)	12	(0)
2014	→ União Madeira (loan)	4	(0)
2014−2016	Aves	28	(1)
2016−2017	Vilaverdense	19	(1)
2017−2018	Ohanense	27	(0)
2018	Mafra	3	(0)
2019−2020	Alverca	39	(1)
2020−2021	Ohanense	23	(0)
2021−	Moncarapachense	5	(0)

International career
2008–2009	Portugal U17	9	(0)
2011	Portugal U19	3	(0)
2012	Portugal U20	3	(0)
- * Club domestic league appearances and goals as of 23:35, 18 November 2021 (UTC)

André Filipe Aguiar Dias (born 18 April 1992 in Torre de Moncorvo, Bragança District) is a Portuguese footballer who plays for Lusitano Ginásio Clube Moncarapachense as a left back.
