= André Dias (footballer, born 2001) =

Portuguese footballer

Personal information
- Full name: André Gonçalves Dias
- Date of birth: 29 June 2001 (age 25)
- Place of birth: Lisbon, Portugal
- Height: 1.71 m (5 ft 7 in)
- Position: Midfielder

Team information
- Current team: Vitória de Sernache
- Number: 10

Youth career
- 2010–2011: Benfica
- 2011–2012: Povoense
- 2012–2017: Sacavenense
- 2017–2018: Belenenses
- 2018–2020: Vilafranquense

Senior career*
Years	Team	Apps	(Gls)
2020–2022	Vilafranquense	24	(2)
2022	União de Santarém	11	(0)
2022–2024	Montalegre	49	(2)
2024–2025	Tirsense	7	(1)
2025	Salgueiros	11	(4)
2025–	Vitória de Sernache	36	(8)
- * Club domestic league appearances and goals as of 13 September 2026

André Gonçalves Dias (born 29 June 2001) is a Portuguese footballer who plays for Liga 3 club Vitória de Sernache as a midfielder.

== Football career ==
He made his professional debut for Vilafranquense on 13 September 2020 in the Liga Portugal 2.
