= Jose Antonio Dias =

Angolan politician

Jose Antonio Dias was the Angolan minister for geology and mines in the 1994 government of José Eduardo dos Santos.

== See also ==
- Politics of Angola
