= José Simões Dias =

Portuguese poet and writer (1844–1899)

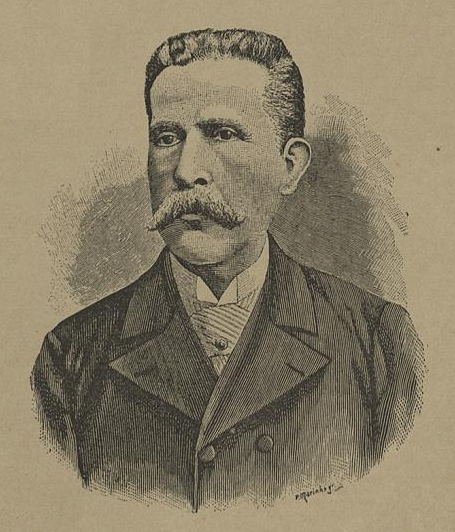
- José Simões Dias in O Occidente (1899)
- Born: 5 February 1844; Benfeita, Portugal
- Died: 3 March 1899 (aged 55); Lisbon, Portugal
- Occupation: Writer

José Simões Dias (1844 in Benfeita, Arganil – 3 March 1899 in Lisbon) was a Portuguese poet, short-story writer and literary critic, as well as politician and pedagogue. His poetry is generally affiliated with the later Romantic tradition, sometimes termed Ultra-Romanticism, although some of his poems, popular in tone, can be seen to betray an affinity for the Realist aesthetics that was then beginning to blossom in Portuguese letters.

As a deputy to the National Assembly under the constitutional monarchy of Luís I, he authored the bill that would transform the birthday of Camões (June 10) into Portugal Day, an important national holiday. His literary collaboration can be found in the magazine Popular Illustration (1884).
